= List of American films of 1930 =

American films released in 1930

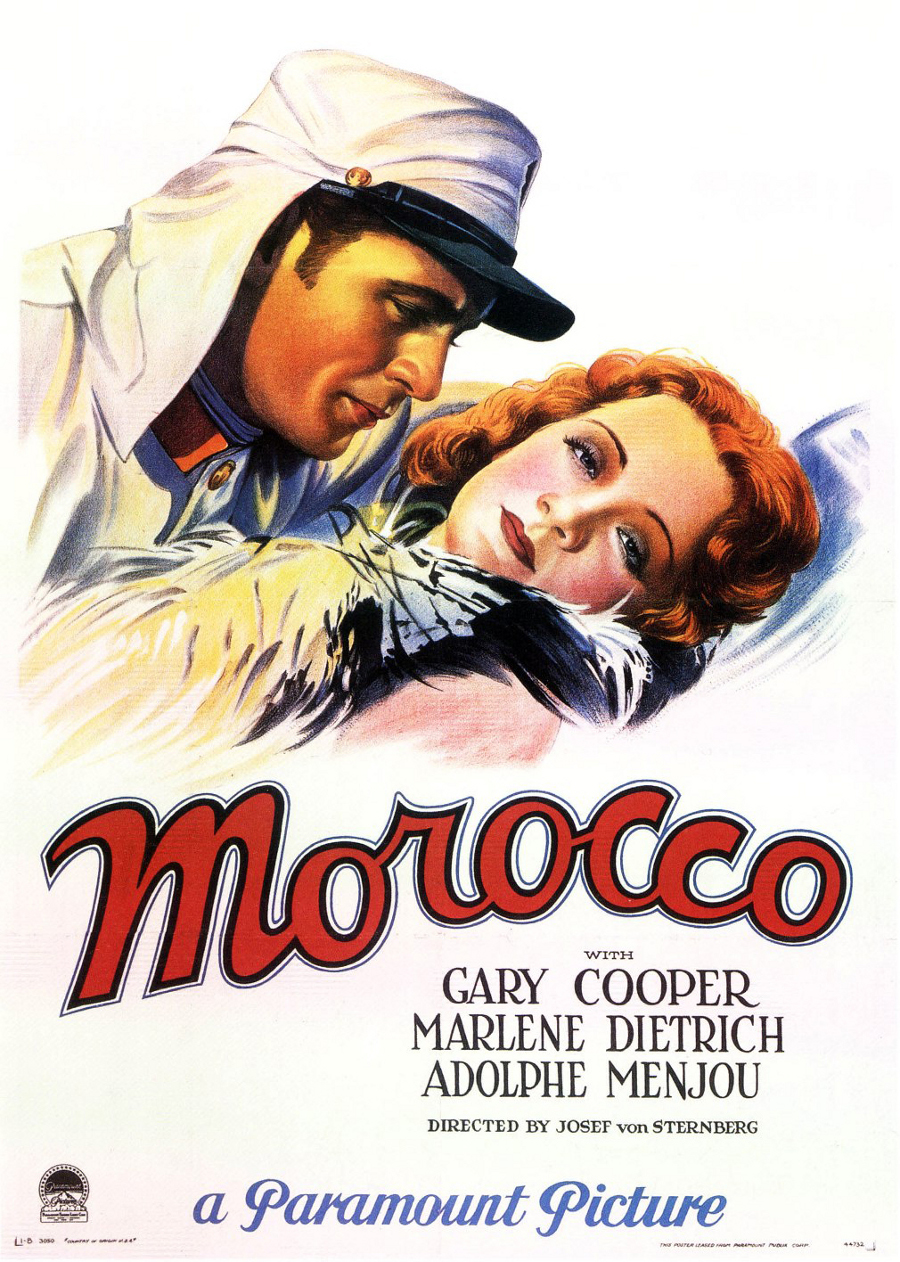
Morocco starring Gary Cooper and Marlene Dietrich.

More than 508 American feature films were released in 1930.

All Quiet on the Western Front won the Academy Award for Best Picture. Any remaining films that were still under copyright entered the public domain on January 1, 2026.

== A ==
Title	Director	Cast	Genre	Notes
Abraham Lincoln	D. W. Griffith	Walter Huston, Kay Hammond	Historical drama	United Artists
Across the World with Mr. and Mrs. Johnson	J. Leo Meehan	Martin and Osa Johnson, George Eastman	Documentary	Martin Johnson Productions
Africa Speaks!	Walter Futter	Paul Hoefler, Lowell Thomas	Adventure documentary	Columbia. Co-production with France
Alias French Gertie	George Archainbaud	Bebe Daniels, Ben Lyon	Romantic melodrama	RKO
All Quiet on the Western Front	Lewis Milestone	Lew Ayres, Louis Wolheim, Arnold Lucy	War drama	Universal
Alma de Gaucho	Henry Otto	Manuel Granada, Mona Rico, Francisco Amerise	Musical drama	Chris Phillis Productions. Spanish language. Rendered in English as Soul of the Gaucho.
Along Came Youth	Lloyd Corrigan	Frances Dee, Charles Rogers, Evelyn Hall	Comedy	Paramount
Amor Audaz	Louis J. Gasnier	Adolphe Menjou, Rosita Moreno	Comedy drama	Paramount. Spanish language production of Slightly Scarlet.
Animal Crackers	Victor Heerman	Groucho Marx, Harpo Marx, Margaret Dumont	Musical comedy	Paramount-Publix
Anna Christie	Clarence Brown	Greta Garbo, Marie Dressler, Charles Bickford	Drama	MGM. Garbo's first talkie. Co-production with Germany.
Anybody's War	Richard Wallace	Joan Peers, Neil Hamilton	Comedy	Paramount
Anybody's Woman	Dorothy Arzner	Ruth Chatterton, Paul Lukas, Clive Brook	Drama	Paramount-Publix
The Apache Kid's Escape	Robert J. Horner	Jack Perrin, Fred Church, Josephine Hill	Western	Robert J. Horner Productions
The Arizona Kid	Alfred Santell	Warner Baxter, Mona Maris, Carole Lombard	Western	Fox Film
Around the Corner	Bert Glennon	Charles Murray, George Sidney, Joan Peers	Comedy	Columbia
Así es la Vida	George Crone	José Bohr, Lolita Vendrell, Delia Magaña	Comedy	Sono Art-World Productions, Inc. Spanish language production of What a Man
Az Orvos Titka	Tibor Hegedüs	Artúr Somlay, Dezső Kertész	Melodrama	Cinéstudio Continental. Hungarian language production of The Doctor's Secret. Co-production with France.

== B ==
Title	Director	Cast	Genre	Notes
Back Pay	William A. Seiter	Corinne Griffith, Grant Withers, Vivien Oakland	Dramedy	Warner Bros.
The Bad Man	Clarence G. Badger	Walter Huston, James Rennie, Myrna Loy	Western	First National
The Bad One	George Fitzmaurice	Dolores del Río, Edmund Lowe, Blanche Friderici	Musical	United Artists
Bar L Ranch	Harry Webb	Buffalo Bill Jr., Yakima Canutt, Betty Baker	Western	Big 4 Film Corp.
The Bat Whispers	Roland West	Chester Morris, Maude Eburne, Chance Ward	Mystery melodrama	United Artists. Widescreen.
Be Yourself	Thornton Freeland	Fanny Brice, Robert Armstrong	Musical comedy	United Artists
Beau Bandit	Lambert Hillyer	Rod La Rocque, Doris Kenyon	Western comedy	RKO
Behind the Make-Up	Robert Milton	William Powell, Fay Wray, Kay Francis	Drama	Paramount Famous Lasky
The Benson Murder Case	Frank Tuttle	William Powell, Paul Lukas, Natalie Moorehead	Mystery melodrama	Paramount Famous Lasky
Beyond the Law	J. P. McGowan	Robert Frazer, Louise Lorraine, Lane Chandler	Western	Rayart
Beyond the Rio Grande	Harry Webb	Jack Perrin, Franklyn Farnum, Charline Burt	Western	Biltmore Productions
Big Boy	Alan Crosland	Al Jolson, Lloyd Hughes, Claudia Dell	Musical	Warner Bros.
The Big Fight	Walter Lang	Lola Lane, Ralph Ince, Guinn Williams	Melodrama	James Cruze Productions
The Big House	George W. Hill	Wallace Beery, Robert Montgomery, Lewis Stone	Drama	MGM
Big Money	Russell Mack	Eddie Quillan, Robert Armstrong, James Gleason	Drama	Pathe Exchange
The Big Party	John G. Blystone	Sue Carol, Dixie Lee	Comedy	Fox Film
The Big Pond	Hobart Henley	Maurice Chevalier, Claudette Colbert	Dramedy	Paramount-Publix
The Big Trail	Raoul Walsh	John Wayne, Marguerite Churchill	Western	Fox Film
Billy the Kid	King Vidor	Wallace Beery, Johnny Mack Brown	Western	MGM. Widescreen.
The Bishop Murder Case	Nick Grinde	Basil Rathbone, Leila Hyams, Roland Young	Mystery drama	MGM
The Border Legion	Otto Brewer	Fay Wray, Richard Arlen	Western	Paramount-Publix
Born Reckless	Andrew Bennison, John Ford	Edmund Lowe, Catherine Dale Owen, Frank Albertson	Crime drama	Fox Film
Borrowed Wives	Frank R. Strayer	Rex Lease, Vera Reynolds	Comedy	Tiffany
The Boudoir Diplomat	Malcolm St. Clair	Betty Compson, Mary Duncan	Comedy	Universal
The Break Up	Jack Robertson	Jack Robertson	Documentary	Unknown production company
Breed of the West	Alan James	Wally Wales, Virginia Brown Faire, Buzz Barton	Western	National Players
Breezy Bill	J. P. McGowan	Bob Steele, Edna Aslin, Bud Osborne	Western	Independent
Bride of the Regiment	John Francis Dillon	Vivienne Segal, Walter Pidgeon	Musical	First National
Bright Lights	Michael Curtiz	James Murray, Noah Beery, Dorothy Mackaill	Musical drama	First National Full Technicolor.
Brothers	Walter Lang	Bert Lytell, Dorothy Sebastian	Crime, romance	Columbia
Burning Up	A. Edward Sutherland	Richard Arlen, Francis McDonald, Charles Sellon	Sports drama	Paramount Famous Lasky

== C ==
Title	Director	Cast	Genre	Notes
The Call of the Circus	Frank O'Connor	Francis X. Bushman, Ethel Clayton	Drama	Pickwick Pictures
Call of the Flesh	Charles Brabin	Ramón Novarro, Dorothy Jordan, Ernest Torrence	Musical/Romance/Drama	MGM. In partial Technicolor.
Call of the West	Albert Ray	Dorothy Revier, Tom O'Brien, Alan Roscoe	Western	Columbia
Cameo Kirby	Irving Cummings	J. Harold Murray, Norma Terris, Myrna Loy	Melodrama	Fox Film
Captain of the Guard	John S. Robertson	Laura La Plante, John Boles	Melodrama	Universal
Captain Thunder	Alan Crosland	Fay Wray, Victor Varconi	Dramedy	Warner Bros.
Caught Short	Charles Reisner	Marie Dressler, Polly Moran, Anita Page	Comedy	MGM
The Case of Sergeant Grischa	Herbert Brenon	Chester Morris, Betty Compson	War drama	RKO
The Cat Creeps...While the Canary Sleeps!	Rupert Julian	Helen Twelvetrees, Neil Hamilton	Horror	Universal
Charley's Aunt	Al Christie	Charles Ruggles, Hugh Williams	Comedy	Columbia
Chasing Rainbows	Charles Reisner	Bessie Love, Charles King	Musical comedy	MGM
Check and Double Check	Melville W. Brown	Freeman F. Gosden, Charles J. Correll, Duke Ellington	Comedy	RKO
Cheer Up and Smile	Sidney Lanfield	Dixie Lee, Olga Baclanova	Musical dramedy	Fox Film
Children of Pleasure	Harry Beaumont	Lawrence Gray, Wynne Gibson	Romantic musical comedy	MGM
City Girl	F. W. Murnau	Charles Farrell, Mary Duncan, Anne Shirley	Drama	Fox Film
The Climax	Renaud Hoffman	Jean Hersholt, Kathryn Crawford	Romance	Universal
Code of Honor	J.P. McGowan	Mahlon Hamilton, Doris Hill, Lafe McKee	Western	Independent
The Cohens and Kellys in Africa	Vin Moore	George Sidney, Vera Gordon	Comedy	Universal
The Cohens and the Kellys in Scotland	William James Craft	George Sidney, Vera Gordon	Comedy	Universal
College Lovers	John G. Adolfi	Marian Nixon, Frank McHugh	Romantic comedy	First National
Common Clay	Victor Fleming	Constance Bennett, Lew Ayres	Melodrama	Fox Film
The Concentratin' Kid	Arthur Rosson	Hoot Gibson, Kathryn Crawford	Western	Universal
Conspiracy	Christy Cabanne	Ned Sparks, Bessie Love, George Irving	Melodrama	RKO
Courage	Archie Mayo	Belle Bennett, Marian Nixon, Blanche Friderici	Drama	Warner Bros.
Crazy That Way	Hamilton MacFadden	Kenneth MacKenna, Joan Bennett	Comedy	Fox Film
The Cuckoos	Paul Sloane	Bert Wheeler, Dorothy Lee	Musical comedy	RKO
The Czar of Broadway	William James Craft	John Wray, Betty Compson, Claud Allister	Crime	Universal

== D-F ==
Title	Director	Cast	Genre	Notes
Dames Ahoy!	William James Craft	Glenn Tryon, Gertrude Astor	Comedy	Universal
The Dancers	Chandler Sprague	Lois Moran, Phillips Holmes, Mae Clarke	Drama	Fox Film
Dancing Sweeties	Ray Enright	Grant Withers, Sue Carol, Tully Marshall	Musical	Warner Bros.
Danger Lights	George B. Seitz	Jean Arthur, Hugh Herbert, Louis Wolheim	Drama	RKO
Dangerous Nan McGrew	Malcolm St. Clair	Helen Kane, Victor Moore, Frank Morgan	Western comedy	Paramount-Publix
Dangerous Paradise	William A. Wellman	Nancy Carroll, Richard Arlen, Warner Oland	Drama	Paramount Famous Lasky
A Daughter of the Congo	Oscar Micheaux	Kathleen Noisette, Lorenzo Tucker, Salem Tutt Whitney	Adventure	Micheaux Pictures
The Dawn Patrol	Howard Hawks	Douglas Fairbanks, Neil Hamilton, Frank McHugh	War drama	Warner Bros., Academy Award winner for the Best Original Screenplay
The Dawn Trail	Christy Cabanne	Marceline Day, Miriam Seegar	Western	Columbia
Derelict	Rowland V. Lee	George Bancroft, Jessie Royce Landis	Adventure	Paramount-Publix
The Devil to Pay!	George Fitzmaurice	Ronald Colman, Loretta Young, Myrna Loy	Comedy	United Artists
A Devil with Women	Irving Cummings	Victor McLaglen, Humphrey Bogart, Mona Maris	Action	Fox Film
The Devil's Holiday	Edmund Goulding	Nancy Carroll, Phillips Holmes	Drama	Paramount-Publix
Divorce Among Friends	Roy Del Ruth	James Hall, Irene Delroy	Comedy	Warner Bros.
The Divorcee	Robert Z. Leonard	Norma Shearer, Chester Morris, Robert Montgomery	Drama	MGM
Dixiana	Luther Reed	Bebe Daniels, Bert Wheeler	Musical comedy	RKO
The Doorway to Hell	Archie Mayo	James Cagney, Lew Ayres, Robert Elliott	Crime drama	Warner Bros.
Double Cross Roads	Alfred L. Werker	Robert Ames, Lila Lee	Romantic drama	Fox Film
Doughboys	Edward Sedgwick	Buster Keaton, Sally Eilers, Edward Brophy	Comedy	MGM
Du Barry, Woman of Passion	Sam Taylor	Norma Talmadge, William Farnum	Historical	United Artists
The Dude Wrangler	Richard Thorpe	Lina Basquette, Tom Keene	Western comedy	Sono Art
Dumbbells in Ermine	John G. Adolfi	Robert Armstrong, Barbara Kent, Beryl Mercer	Comedy	Warner Bros.
East Is West	Monta Bell	Edward G. Robinson, Lupe Vélez, Lew Ayres	Drama	Universal
Embarrassing Moments	William James Craft	Reginald Denny, Merna Kennedy	Dramedy	Universal
Extravagance	Phil Rosen	June Collyer, Lloyd Hughes	Drama	Tiffany
Ex-Flame	Victor Halperin	Neil Hamilton, Marian Nixon	Drama	Liberty
The Eyes of the World	Henry King	Eulalie Jensen, Hugh Huntley, Una Merkel	Drama	United Artists
The Fall Guy	Leslie Pearce	Ned Sparks, Mae Clarke, Jack Mulhall	Crime comedy	RKO
Fast and Loose	Fred C. Newmeyer	Miriam Hopkins, Carole Lombard, Frank Morgan	Drama	Paramount-Publix
Feet First	Clyde Bruckman	Harold Lloyd, Barbara Kent	Comedy	Paramount-Publix
The Fighting Legion	Harry Joe Brown	Ken Maynard, Dorothy Dwan	Western	Universal
Firebrand Jordan	Alan James	Lane Chandler, Sheldon Lewis, Yakima Canutt	Western	Independent
The Flirting Widow	William A. Seiter	Dorothy Mackaill, Basil Rathbone	Comedy	First National
The Florodora Girl	Harry Beaumont	Marion Davies, Lawrence Gray	Musical	MGM
Follow the Leader	Norman Taurog, Albert Parker	Ed Wynn, Ginger Rogers, Ethel Merman	Musical comedy	Paramount-Publix
Follow Thru	Lloyd Corrigan	Buddy Rogers, Nancy Carroll	Musical comedy	Paramount-Publix
For the Defense	John Cromwell	William Powell, Kay Francis, William B. Davidson	Drama	Paramount-Publix
Framed	George Archainbaud	Evelyn Brent, Regis Toomey	Crime	RKO
Free and Easy	Edward Sedgwick	Buster Keaton, Robert Montgomery, Anita Page	Comedy	MGM
Free Love	Hobart Henley	Conrad Nagel, Genevieve Tobin	Comedy	Universal
The Furies	Alan Crosland	Lois Wilson, H. B. Warner	Mystery/Melodrama	First National

== G-K ==
Title	Director	Cast	Genre	Notes
General Crack	Alan Crosland	John Barrymore, Marian Nixon, Lowell Sherman	Drama	Warner Bros. MGM. In partial Technicolor
Girl of the Port	Bert Glennon	Sally O'Neil, Mitchell Lewis	Romantic drama	RKO
The Girl of the Golden West	John Francis Dillon	Ann Harding, James Rennie, Harry Bannister	Western	First National
The Girl Said No	Sam Wood	William Haines, Marie Dressler, Polly Moran	Romantic comedy	MGM
The Gorilla	Bryan Foy	Joe Frisco, Walter Pidgeon, Lila Lee	Mystery	First National
The Green Goddess	Alfred E. Green	George Arliss, Alice Joyce, H.B. Warner	Melodrama	Warner Bros.
The Golden Calf	Millard Webb	Jack Mulhall, Sue Carol	Musical romantic comedy	Fox Film
Golden Dawn	Ray Enright	Walter Woolf King, Vivienne Segal	Musical melodrama	Warner Bros.
Going Wild	William A. Seiter	Joe E. Brown, Lawrence Gray, Ona Munson	Musical	First National
Good Intentions	William K. Howard	Edmund Lowe, Marguerite Churchill	Melodrama	Fox Film
Good News	Nick Grinde	Bessie Love, Cliff Edwards	Musical comedy	MGM
The Grand Parade	Fred C. Newmeyer	Helen Twelvetrees, Fred Scott	Drama	Pathé Exchange
Grumpy	George Cukor	Cyril Maude, Frances Dade	Melodrama	Paramount
Guilty?	George B. Seitz	Virginia Valli, John Holland	Melodrama	Columbia
Half Shot at Sunrise	Paul Sloane	Bert Wheeler, Robert Woolsey, Dorothy Lee	Comedy	RKO
Harmony at Home	Hamilton MacFadden	Marguerite Churchill, Charlotte Henry	Dramedy	Fox Film
He Knew Women	Hugh Herbert	Lowell Sherman, Alice Joyce	Dramedy	RKO
Headin' North	John P. McCarthy	Bob Steele, Barbara Luddy	Western	Tiffany
Heads Up	Victor Schertzinger	Charles "Buddy" Rogers, Helen Kane	Comedy	Paramount-Publix
Hell Harbor	Henry King	Lupe Vélez, Jean Hersholt	Romantic drama	United Artists
Hell's Angels	Howard Hughes	Jean Harlow, Ben Lyon, James Hall	War drama	United Artists
Hell's Heroes	William Wyler	Charles Bickford, Raymond Hatton	Western	Universal
Hell's Island	Edward Sloman	Jack Holt, Ralph Graves, Dorothy Sebastian	Drama	Columbia
Her Wedding Night	Frank Tuttle	Clara Bow, Ralph Forbes	Romantic comedy	Paramount-Publix
Hide-Out	Reginald Barker	James Murray, Kathryn Crawford	Melodrama	Universal
High Society Blues	David Butler	Janet Gaynor, Charles Farrell, Hedda Hopper	Musical comedy	Fox Film
Hit the Deck	Luther Reed	Jack Oakie, Roger Gray	Musical comedy	RKO
Hold Everything	Roy Del Ruth	Winnie Lightner, Joe E. Brown	Musical comedy	Warner Bros.
Holiday	Edward H. Griffith	Ann Harding, Mary Astor	Romantic comedy	Pathé Exchange
Honey	Wesley Ruggles	Nancy Carroll, Lillian Roth	Comedy	Paramount
Hook, Line and Sinker	Edward F. Cline	Bert Wheeler, Dorothy Lee	Romantic comedy	RKO
Hot Curves	Norman Taurog	Benny Rubin, Rex Lease, Alice Day	Dramedy	Tiffany
In Gay Madrid	Robert Z. Leonard	Ramon Novarro, Dorothy Jordan	Musical comedy	MGM
In the Next Room	Edward F. Cline	Jack Mulhall, Alice Day	Melodrama/Thriller	First National
Ingagi	William Campbell		Exploitation	Congo Pictures
Inside the Lines	Roy Pomeroy	Betty Compson, Montagu Love, Betty Carter	Melodrama	RKO
Isle of Escape	Howard Bretherton	Monte Blue, Myrna Loy	Adventure	Warner Bros.
The Jazz Cinderella	Scott Pembroke	Myrna Loy, Nancy Welford	Drama	Chesterfield
Journey's End	James Whale	Colin Clive, David Manners	War	Tiffany. Co-production with the United Kingdom.
Just Imagine	David Butler	Maureen O'Sullivan, John Garrick	Musical	Fox Film
Just Like Heaven	Roy William Neill	Anita Louise, David Newell, Yola d'Avril	Drama	Tiffany
Kathleen Mavourneen	Albert Ray	Sally O'Neil, Charles Delaney	Drama	Tiffany
The Kibitzer	Edward Sloman	Mary Brian, Neil Hamilton	Comedy	Paramount Famous Lasky
King of Jazz	John Murray Anderson	Bing Crosby, Paul Whiteman, John Boles	Musical	Universal. In full Technicolor
Kismet	John Francis Dillon	Otis Skinner, Loretta Young, David Manners	Costume drama	First National

== L-N ==
Title	Director	Cast	Genre	Notes
Ladies in Love	Edgar Lewis	Alice Day, Johnnie Walker	Romance	Chesterfield
Ladies Love Brutes	Rowland V. Lee	George Bancroft, Mary Astor, Fredric March	Comedy	Paramount-Publix
Ladies of Leisure	Frank Capra	Barbara Stanwyck, Ralph Graves	Romantic drama	Columbia
The Lady of Scandal	Sidney Franklin	Ruth Chatterton, Basil Rathbone	Romantic comedy	MGM
A Lady Surrenders	John M. Stahl	Genevieve Tobin, Conrad Nagel	Drama	Universal
A Lady to Love	Victor Sjostrom	Edward G. Robinson, Vilma Bánky, Robert Ames	Romantic drama	MGM
A Lady's Morals	Sidney Franklin	Grace Moore, Reginald Denny, Wallace Beery	Musical melodrama	MGM
The Land of Missing Men	John P. McCarthy	Bob Steele, Al St. John	Western	Tiffany
The Lash	Frank Lloyd	Richard Barthelmess, Mary Astor, Marian Nixon	Drama	First National
The Last of the Duanes	Alfred L. Werker	George O'Brien, Lucile Browne	Western	Fox Film
Laughter	Harry d'Abbadie d'Arrast	Nancy Carroll, Fredric March	Comedy	Paramount-Publix
Lawful Larceny	Lowell Sherman	Bebe Daniels, Olive Tell	Melodrama	RKO
Leathernecking	Edward F. Cline	Irene Dunne, Ken Murray	Musical comedy/drama	RKO
Let Us Be Gay	Robert Z. Leonard	Norma Shearer, Marie Dressler, Rod La Rocque	Dramedy	MGM
Let's Go Native	Leo McCarey	Jack Oakie, Jeanette MacDonald	Musical comedy	Paramount-Publix
Let's Go Places	Frank R. Strayer	Joseph Wagstaff, Lola Lane	Musical	Fox Film
The Life of the Party	Roy Del Ruth	Winnie Lightner, Jack Whiting	Musical comedy	Warner Bros.
Lightnin'	Henry King	Will Rogers, Louise Dresser, Joel McCrea	Comedy	Fox Film
The Light of Western Stars	Otto Brower	Richard Arlen, Mary Brian	Western	Paramount Famous Lasky
Lilies of the Field	Alexander Korda	Corinne Griffith, Ralph Forbes	Drama	First National
Liliom	Frank Borzage	Charles Farrell, Rose Hobart	Melodrama/Fantasy	Fox Film
The Little Accident	William James Craft	Douglas Fairbanks, Anita Page, Sally Blane	Comedy	Universal
The Lone Rider	Louis King	Buck Jones, Vera Reynolds, Harry Woods	Western	Columbia
The Lone Star Ranger	A.F. Erickson	George O'Brien, Sue Carol	Western	Fox Film
Loose Ankles	Ted Wilde	Loretta Young, Douglas Fairbanks Jr.	Drama	Warner Bros.
Lord Byron of Broadway	Harry Beaumont	Charles Kaley, Ethelind Terry	Romantic drama	MGM
The Lottery Bride	Paul L. Stein	Jeanette MacDonald, John Garrick, Joe E. Brown	Musical melodrama	United Artists
Lotus Lady	Phil Rosen	Fern Andra, Betty Francisco	Romance	Audible Pictures
Love Among the Millionaires	Frank Tuttle	Clara Bow, Stuart Erwin	Drama	Paramount-Publix
Love Comes Along	Rupert Julian	Bebe Daniels, Montagu Love	Romantic melodrama	RKO
Love in the Rough	Charles Reisner	Robert Montgomery, Dorothy Jordan	Musical comedy	MGM
The Love Trader	Joseph Henabery	Chester Conklin, Henry B. Walthall	Drama	Tiffany
Lovin' the Ladies	Melville W. Brown	Richard Dix, Rita La Roy, Lois Wilson	Comedy	RKO
Lucky Larkin	Harry Joe Brown	Ken Maynard, Nora Lane	Western	Universal
Lummox	Herbert Brenon	Winifred Westover, Dorothy Janis	Drama	United Artists
Madam Satan	Cecil B. DeMille	Kay Johnson, Reginald Denny	Musical romantic comedy	MGM
Madonna of the Streets	John S. Robertson	Evelyn Brent, Robert Ames	Drama	Columbia
Mamba	Albert S. Rogell	Jean Hersholt, Eleanor Boardman	Drama	Tiffany
Mammy	Michael Curtiz	Al Jolson, Lois Moran	Musical	Warner Bros.
The Man from Blankley's	Alfred E. Green	John Barrymore, Loretta Young	Comedy	Warner Bros.
A Man from Wyoming	Rowland V. Lee	Gary Cooper, June Collyer, Regis Toomey	War romance	Paramount-Publix
The Man Hunter	D. Ross Lederman	Rin Tin Tin, Nora Lane	Adventure	Warner Bros.
Man to Man	Allan Dwan	Phillips Holmes, Grant Mitchell	Drama	Warner Bros.
Man Trouble	Berthold Viertel	Dorothy Mackaill, Kenneth MacKenna	Melodrama	Fox Film
Manslaughter	George Abbott	Claudette Colbert, Fredric March, Natalie Moorehead	Drama	Paramount-Publix
The Matrimonial Bed	Michael Curtiz	Frank Fay, Lilyan Tashman	Dramedy	Warner Bros.
Maybe It's Love	William A. Wellman	Joan Bennett, Joe E. Brown	Musical comedy	Warner Bros.
The Medicine Man	Scott Pembroke	Jack Benny, Betty Bronson	Romantic comedy	Tiffany
The Melody Man	Roy William Neill	John St. Polis, Alice Day	Musical	Columbia
Men Are Like That	Frank Tuttle	Hal Skelly, Doris Hill	Drama	Paramount Famous Lasky
Men of the North	Hal Roach	Gilbert Roland, Arnold Korff	Western	MGM
Men Without Women	John Ford	Kenneth MacKenna, Frank Albertson	Melodrama	Fox Film
Midnight Daddies	Mack Sennett	Andy Clyde, Harry Gribbon, Rosemary Theby	Comedy	Independent
Midnight Mystery	George B. Seitz	Betty Compson, Lowell Sherman	Thriller	RKO
The Midnight Special	Duke Worne	Glenn Tryon, Merna Kennedy	Drama	Chesterfield
Min and Bill	George W. Hill	Marie Dressler, Wallace Beery	Dramedy	MGM
Moby Dick	Lloyd Bacon	John Barrymore, Joan Bennett, Noble Johnson	Drama	Warner Bros.
A Modern Jean Val Jean; or a Frame Up	unknown	Al Hagan	Biography	production company unknown
Montana Moon	Malcolm St. Clair	Joan Crawford, Ricardo Cortez	Western dramedy	MGM
Monte Carlo	Ernst Lubitsch	Jeanette MacDonald, Jack Buchanan, ZaSu Pitts	Musical comedy	Paramount-Publix
Morocco	Josef von Sternberg	Marlene Dietrich, Gary Cooper, Adolphe Menjou	Drama	Paramount-Publix
Mothers Cry	Hobart Henley	Dorothy Peterson, Helen Chandler, David Manners	Drama	Warner Bros.
Mountain Justice	Harry Joe Brown	Ken Maynard, Kathryn Crawford	Western	Universal
The Mounted Stranger	Arthur Rosson	Hoot Gibson, Fred Burns	Western	Universal
Murder on the Roof	George B. Seitz	Dorothy Revier, Raymond Hatton	Mystery melodrama	Columbia
Murder Will Out	Clarence G. Badger	Jack Mulhall, Lila Lee, Noah Beery	Mystery	Warner Bros.
Near the Rainbow's End	J. P. McGowan	Bob Steele, Louise Lorraine	Western	Tiffany
New Moon	Jack Conway	Lawrence Tibbett, Grace Moore, Adolphe Menjou	Musical	MGM
New Movietone Follies of 1930	Benjamin Stoloff	El Brendel, Marjorie White	Musical	Fox Film
Night Ride	John S. Robertson	Joseph Schildkraut, Barbara Kent, Edward G. Robinson	Melodrama	Universal
No, No, Nanette	Clarence G. Badger	Bernice Claire, Alexander Gray, Lucien Littlefield	Musical	First National
Not Damaged	Chandler Sprague	Lois Moran, Robert Ames	Romantic dramedy	Fox Film
Not So Dumb	King Vidor	Marion Davies, Franklin Pangborn, Julia Faye	Comedy	MGM
A Notorious Affair	Lloyd Bacon	Billie Dove, Basil Rathbone, Kay Francis	Romance	First National
Numbered Men	Mervyn LeRoy	Bernice Claire, Conrad Nagel	Melodrama	First National

== O-Q ==
Title	Director	Cast	Genre	Notes
The Office Wife	Lloyd Bacon	Dorothy Mackaill, Lewis Stone, Joan Blondell	Romantic drama	Warner Bros.
Officer O'Brien	Tay Garnett	William Boyd, Ernest Torrence, Dorothy Sebastian	Crime	Pathe Exchange
Oh, For a Man!	Hamilton MacFadden	Jeanette MacDonald, Reginald Denny	Musical	Fox Film
Oh Sailor Behave	Archie Mayo	Irene Delroy, Lowell Sherman	Musical dramedy	Warner Bros.
Oklahoma Cyclone	John P. McCarthy	Bob Steele, Slim Whitaker	Western drama	Tiffany
Old English	Alfred E. Green	George Arliss, Leon Janney	Drama	Warner Bros.
On the Border	William C. McGann	Rin Tin Tin, Armida	Adventure	Warner Bros.
On the Level	Irving Cummings	Victor McLaglen, Lilyan Tashman, Fifi D'Orsay	Action	Fox Film
On Your Back	Guthrie McClintic	Irene Rich, Raymond Hackett, H. B. Warner	Drama	Fox Film
Once a Gentleman	James Cruze	Edward Everett Horton, Lois Wilson, Francis X. Bushman	Comedy	Sono Art
One Mad Kiss	James Tinling	José Mojica, Mona Maris	Musical	Fox Film
One Night at Susie's	John Francis Dillon	Billie Dove, Douglas Fairbanks Jr.	Melodrama	First National
One Romantic Night	Paul L. Stein	Lillian Gish, Rod La Rocque	Romance	United Artists
Only Saps Work	Cyril Gardner, Edwin H. Knopf	Leon Errol, Richard Arlen, Mary Brian	Comedy	Paramount-Publix
Only the Brave	Frank Tuttle	Gary Cooper, Mary Brian, Guy Oliver	War romance	Paramount Famous Lasky
The Other Tomorrow	Lloyd Bacon	Billie Dove, Kenneth Thomson, Grant Withers	Drama	First National
Our Blushing Brides	Harry Beaumont, Bess Meredyth	Joan Crawford, Robert Montgomery, Anita Page	Melodrama	MGM
Outside the Law	Tod Browning	Edward G. Robinson, Mary Nolan, Owen Moore	Criminal melodrama	Universal
Outward Bound	Robert Milton	Leslie Howard, Douglas Fairbanks, Jr., Helen Chandler	Drama	Warner Bros.
Paid	Sam Wood	Joan Crawford, Marie Provost, Robert Armstrong	Melodrama	MGM
Parade of the West	Harry Joe Brown	Ken Maynard, Gladys McConnell	Western	Universal
Paradise Island	Bert Glennon	Kenneth Harlan, Marceline Day	Musical	Tiffany
Paramount on Parade	Dorothy Arzner, Otto Brower	Jean Arthur, Maurice Chevalier, Gary Cooper	Musical	Paramount Famous Lasky
Part Time Wife	Leo McCarey	Edmund Lowe, Leila Hyams	Comedy	Fox Film
Party Girl	Victor Halperin	Douglas Fairbanks Jr., Jeanette Loff, Marie Provost	Drama	Personality Pictures
Passion Flower	William C. deMille	Kay Francis, Kay Johnson, Charles Bickford	Drama	MGM
The Pay-Off	Lowell Sherman	Lowell Sherman, Marian Nixon, William Janney	Melodrama	RKO
Peacock Alley	Marcel de Sano	Mae Murray, Jason Robards Sr.	Romance	Tiffany
The Phantom of the Desert	Harry S. Webb	Jack Perrin, Eva Novak, Josef Swickard	Western	Independent
Playboy of Paris	Ludwig Berger	Maurice Chevalier, Frances Dee	Musical romantic comedy	Paramount-Publix
Playing Around	Mervyn LeRoy	Alice White, Chester Morris	Drama	First National
Playthings of Hollywood	William A. O'Connor	Rita La Roy, Sheila Bromley, Donald Reed	Drama	Independent
The Poor Millionaire	George Melford	Richard Talmadge, Constance Howard, George Irving	Drama	Independent
The Princess and the Plumber	Alexander Korda	Charles Farrell, Maureen O'Sullivan	Romantic dramedy	Fox Film
Puttin' On The Ritz	Edward Sloman	Joan Bennett, Harry Richman, George Irving	Musical	United Artists
Queen High	Fred C. Newmeyer	Charlie Ruggles, Frank Morgan, Ginger Rogers	Musical comedy	Paramount-Publix

== R-S ==
Title	Director	Cast	Genre	Notes
Raffles	George Fitzmaurice	Ronald Colman, Kay Francis	Mystery	United Artists
Rain Or Shine	Frank Capra	Louise Fazenda, Joan Peers, Joe Cook	Dramedy	Columbia
The Rampant Age	Phil Rosen	James Murray, Merna Kennedy, Eddie Borden	Drama	Independent
Recaptured Love	John G. Adolfi	Belle Bennett, Dorothy Burgess	Comedy-Drama	Warner Bros.
Redemption	Fred Niblo	John Gilbert, Renée Adorée, Conrad Nagel	Drama	MGM
Remote Control	Malcolm St. Clair	William Haines, Mary Doran	Comedy	MGM
Renegades	Victor Fleming	Warner Baxter, Myrna Loy, Noah Beery	Western	Fox Film
The Return of Dr. Fu Manchu	Rowland V. Lee	Warner Oland, Jean Arthur	Detective	Paramount-Publix
The Right to Love	Richard Wallace	Ruth Chatterton, Paul Lukas, Irving Pichel	Drama	Paramount-Publix
River's End	Michael Curtiz	Charles Bickford, Evalyn Knapp	Drama	Warner Bros.
Road to Paradise	William Beaudine	Loretta Young, Jack Mulhall, George Barraud	Melodrama	First National
Roadhouse Nights	Hobart Henley	Helen Morgan, Charles Ruggles	Crime comedy	Paramount Famous Lasky
Roaring Ranch	B. Reeves Eason	Hoot Gibson, Sally Eilers	Western	Universal
Rogue of the Rio Grande	Spencer Gordon Bennet	José Bohr, Myrna Loy	Comedy	Sono Art
The Rogue Song	Lionel Barrymore	Lawrence Tibbett, Clifford Grey	Operetta	MGM
Romance	Clarence Brown	Greta Garbo, Lewis Stone	Romantic drama	MGM
Romance of the West	Robert Emmett Tansey	Jack Perrin, Edna Marion, Tom London	Western	Independent
Rough Romance	A.F. Erickson	George O'Brien, Helen Chandler	Western	Fox Film
Rough Waters	John Daumery	Rin Tin Tin, Jobyna Ralston	Adventure	Warner Bros.
A Royal Romance	Erle C. Kenton	William Collier Jr., Pauline Starke, Clarence Muse	Romantic comedy	Columbia Pictures
The Runaway Bride	Donald Crisp	Mary Astor, Lloyd Hughes, Paul Hurst	Melodrama	RKO
Safety in Numbers	Victor Schertzinger	Carole Lombard, Charles Rogers, Kathryn Crawford	Musical, Comedy	Paramount-Publix
The Santa Fe Trail	Otto Brower	Richard Arlen, Rosita Moreno	Western	Paramount-Publix
The Sap from Syracuse	A. Edward Sutherland	Jack Oakie, Ginger Rogers	Comedy	Paramount-Publix
Sarah and Son	Dorothy Arzner	Ruth Chatterton, Fredric March	Drama	Paramount Famous Lasky
Scarlet Pages	Ray Enright	Elsie Ferguson, John Halliday, Grant Withers	Melodrama	First National
Scotland Yard	William K. Howard	Edmund Lowe, Joan Bennett	Melodrama	Fox Film
The Sea Bat	Wesley Ruggles	Raquel Torres, Charles Bickford, Nils Asther	Melodrama	MGM
The Sea God	George Abbott	Richard Arlen, Fay Wray	Adventure	Paramount-Publix
Sea Legs	Victor Heerman	Jack Oakie, Lillian Roth	Comedy	Paramount-Publix
The Sea Wolf	Alfred Santell	Milton Sills, Raymond Hackett	Melodrama	Fox Film
Second Choice	Howard Bretherton	Dolores Costello, Chester Morris	Romance	Warner Bros.
The Second Floor Mystery	Roy Del Ruth	Grant Withers, Loretta Young, H. B. Warner	Mystery	Warner Bros.
Second Honeymoon	Phil Rosen	Josephine Dunn, Bernice Elliott, Edward Earle	Comedy, Drama	Trem Carr Pictures
Second Wife	Russell Mack	Conrad Nagel, Lila Lee	Drama	RKO
See America Thirst	William James Craft	Harry Langdon, Bessie Love	Comedy	Universal
Seven Days Leave	Richard Wallace	Gary Cooper, Beryl Mercer	Drama	Paramount Famous Lasky
Shadow of the Law	Louis J. Gasnier	William Powell, Marion Shilling	Crime/Romance	Paramount-Publix
Shadow Ranch	Louis King	Buck Jones, Marguerite De La Motte	Western	Columbia
She Couldn't Say No	Lloyd Bacon	Winnie Lightner, Chester Morris	Drama	Warner Bros.
She Got What She Wanted	James Cruze	Betty Compson, Lee Tracy	Comedy	Tiffany
She's My Weakness	Melville W. Brown	Sue Carol, Arthur Lake	Romantic comedy	RKO
The Ship from Shanghai	Charles Brabin	Conrad Nagel, Kay Johnson	Melodrama	MGM
Shooting Straight	George Archainbaud	Richard Dix, James Neill	Crime	RKO
Showgirl in Hollywood	Mervyn LeRoy	Alice White, Jack Mulhall, Blanche Sweet	Musical dramedy	First National
The Silver Horde	George Archainbaud	Evelyn Brent, Joel McCrea, Jean Arthur	Melodrama	RKO
Sin Takes a Holiday	Paul L. Stein	Constance Bennett, Basil Rathbone	Romance	Pathé
Sinners' Holiday	John G. Adolfi	Grant Withers, Evalyn Knapp	Melodrama	Warner Bros.
The Sins of the Children	Sam Wood	Louis Mann, Robert Montgomery	Drama	MGM
Sisters	James Flood	Sally O'Neil, Molly O'Day	Crime	Columbia
Slightly Scarlet	Louis J. Gasnier, Edwin H. Knopf	Evelyn Brent, Clive Brook	Comedy drama	Paramount Famous Lasky
So This Is London	John G. Blystone	Will Rogers, Irene Rich	Comedy	Fox Film
The Social Lion	A. Edward Sutherland	Jack Oakie, Mary Brian, Richard 'Skeets' Gallagher	Sports/Romantic comedy	Paramount-Publix
A Soldier's Plaything	Michael Curtiz	Ben Lyon, Harry Langdon, Noah Beery	War comedy/drama	Warner Bros.
Soldiers and Women	Edward Sloman	Aileen Pringle, Grant Withers	Mystery	Columbia
Son of the Gods	Frank Lloyd	Richard Barthelmess, Constance Bennett	Romantic drama	Warner Bros.
Song o' My Heart	Frank Borzage	John McCormack, Maureen O'Sullivan	Musical drama	Fox Film
Song of the Caballero	Harry Joe Brown	Ken Maynard, Doris Hill	Western	Universal
Song of the Flame	Alan Crosland	Alexander Gray, Bernice Claire, Noah Beery	Drama	First National/Warner Bros.
Song of the West	Ray Enright	John Boles, Vivienne Segal	Musical/Western	Warner Bros.
Sons of the Saddle	Harry Joe Brown	Ken Maynard, Doris Hill	Western	Universal
Soup to Nuts	Benjamin Stoloff	Ted Healy, Shemp Howard, Frances McCoy	Comedy	Fox Film
The Spoilers	Edwin Carewe	Gary Cooper, Kay Johnson	Western	Paramount-Publix
Spring Is Here	John Francis Dillon	Lawrence Gray, Bernice Claire	Musical	First National
The Squealer	Harry Joe Brown	Jack Holt, Dorothy Revier	Crime	Columbia
Spurs	B. Reeves Eason	Hoot Gibson, Robert Homans	Western	Universal
The Storm	William Wyler	Lupe Vélez, Paul Cavanagh, William Boyd	Western	Universal
Street of Chance	John Cromwell	William Powell, Jean Arthur, Kay Francis	Drama	Paramount Famous Lasky
Strictly Modern	William A. Seiter	Dorothy Mackaill, Sidney Blackmer	Romance	Warner Bros.
Strictly Unconventional	David Burton	Catherine Dale Owen, Paul Cavanagh	Drama	MGM
Such Men Are Dangerous	Kenneth Hawks	Catherine Dale Owen, Hedda Hopper, Bela Lugosi	Melodrama	Fox Film
Sunny	William A. Seiter	Marilyn Miller, Lawrence Gray, O. P. Heggie	Musical	Warner Bros.
Sunny Skies	Norman Taurog	Benny Rubin, Marceline Day, Rex Lease	Comedy. Musical	Tiffany
Sweet Kitty Bellairs	Alfred E. Green	Claudia Dell, Walter Pidgeon, Ernest Torrence	Musical drama	Warner Bros.
Sweet Mama	Edward F. Cline	Alice White, David Manners	Drama	Warner Bros.
Sweethearts and Wives	Clarence G. Badger	Billie Dove, Clive Brook, Sidney Blackmer	Mystery	First National
The Swellhead	James Flood	James Gleason, Marion Shilling	Melodrama	Tiffany
Swing High	Joseph Santley	Helen Twelvetrees, Dorothy Burgess, John Sheehan	Musical	Pathe Exchange

== T-Z ==
Title	Director	Cast	Genre	Notes
Take the Heir	Lloyd Ingraham	Edward Everett Horton, Dorothy Devore, Edythe Chapman	Comedy	Independent
Temple Tower	Donald Gallaher	Kenneth MacKenna, Marceline Day	Thriller	Fox Film
The Texan	John Cromwell	Gary Cooper, Fay Wray, Emma Dunn	Western	Paramount-Publix
The Thoroughbred	Richard Thorpe	Wesley Barry, Judith Barrett, Pauline Garon	Sports drama	Tiffany
They Learned About Women	Jack Conway, Sam Wood	Van and Schenck, Bessie Love	Musical	MGM
The Third Alarm	Emory Johnson	Anita Louise, Jean Hersholt	Adventure	Tiffany
This Mad World	William C. deMille	Kay Johnson, Basil Rathbone	War drama	MGM
Those Three French Girls	Harry Beaumont	Fifi D'Orsay, Reginald Denny	Comedy	MGM
Those Who Dance	William Beaudine	Monte Blue, Lila Lee, Betty Compson	Crime	Warner Bros.
Three Faces East	Roy Del Ruth	Constance Bennett, Erich von Stroheim	War/Romance	Warner Bros.
The Three Sisters	Paul Sloane	Louise Dresser, Joyce Compton	Drama	Fox Film
Thus Is Life	George Crone	José Bohr, Delia Magana	Romantic comedy	Tiffany. Spanish language
Today	William Nigh	Conrad Nagel, Catherine Dale Owen	Drama	Majestic
Tol'able David	John G. Blystone	Richard Cromwell, Noah Beery	Melodrama	Columbia
Tom Sawyer	John Cromwell	Jackie Coogan, Junior Durkin, Mitzi Green	Adventure	Paramount-Publix
Top Speed	Mervyn LeRoy	Joe E. Brown, Laura Lee, Frank McHugh	Musical, Comedy	Warner Bros.
Trailing Trouble	Arthur Rosson	Hoot Gibson, William McCall	Western	Universal
Trigger Tricks	B. Reeves Eason	Hoot Gibson, Sally Eilers	Western	Universal
Troopers Three	Norman Taurog, B. Reeves Eason	Rex Lease, Dorothy Gulliver	Comedy-Drama	Tiffany
True to the Navy	Frank Tuttle	Fredric March, Clara Bow, Harry Green	Comedy	Paramount-Publix
The Truth About Youth	William A. Seiter	Loretta Young, Myrna Loy, David Manners	Romance	First National
Under a Texas Moon	Michael Curtiz	Myrna Loy, Noah Beery, Raquel Torres	Western, Comedy	Warner Bros.
Under Montana Skies	Richard Thorpe	Kenneth Harlan, Slim Summerville, Dorothy Gulliver	Western	Tiffany
Undertow	Harry A. Pollard	Mary Nolan, Johnny Mack Brown	Drama	Universal
The Unholy Three	Jack Conway	Lon Chaney, Lila Lee, Harry Earles	Criminal melodrama	MGM
Up the River	John Ford	Spencer Tracy, Humphrey Bogart, Claire Luce	Comedy, Drama	Fox Film
The Utah Kid	Richard Thorpe	Rex Lease, Dorothy Sebastian, Tom Santschi	Western	Tiffany
The Vagabond King	Ludwig Berger	Jeanette MacDonald, O.P. Heggie, Lillian Roth	Musical	Paramount Famous Lasky
Viennese Nights	Alan Crosland	Vivienne Segal, Walter Pidgeon	Musical	Warner Bros.
The Virtuous Sin	George Cukor	Walter Huston, Kay Francis	Comedy drama	Paramount-Publix
War Nurse	Edgar Selwyn	Robert Montgomery, Anita Page, June Walker	War drama	MGM
Way for a Sailor	Sam Wood	John Gilbert, Wallace Beery	Romantic dramedy	MGM
The Way of All Men	Frank Lloyd	Douglas Fairbanks Jr., Dorothy Revier	Melodrama	First National
Way Out West	Fred Niblo	William Haines, Polly Moran, Leila Hyams	Western comedy drama	MGM
Westward Bound	Harry S. Webb	Jay Wilsey, Allene Ray, Buddy Roosevelt	Western	Independent
What a Man!	George Crone	Reginald Denny, Miriam Seegar	Romantic comedy	Tiffany
What a Widow!	Allan Dwan	Gloria Swanson, Owen Moore	Romantic comedy	United Artists
What Men Want	Ernst Laemmle	Pauline Starke, Ben Lyon	Drama	Universal
Whoopee!	Thornton Freeland	Eddie Cantor, Eleanor Hunt, Ethel Shutta	Musical	United Artists
Wide Open	Archie Mayo	Edward Everett Horton, Patsy Ruth Miller	Comedy	Warner Bros.
The Widow From Chicago	Edward F. Cline	Edward G. Robinson, Alice White, Frank McHugh	Drama, Crime	First National
Wild Company	Leo McCarey	Joyce Compton, H. B. Warner, Bela Lugosi	Drama	Fox Film
Wings of Adventure	Richard Thorpe	Rex Lease, Armida, Clyde Cook	Action	Tiffany
The Woman Racket	Albert H. Kelley	Tom Moore, Blanche Sweet, Tenen Holtz	Drama, Crime	MGM
Women Everywhere	Alexander Korda	J. Harold Murray, Fifi D'Orsay	Romance	Fox Film
Worldly Goods	Phil Rosen	James Kirkwood Sr., Merna Kennedy	Melodrama	Trem Carr Pictures.
Young Desire	Lewis D. Collins	Mary Nolan, William Janney	Drama	Universal
Young Eagles	William A. Wellman	Jean Arthur, Charles Rogers, Paul Lukas	Melodrama	Paramount Famous Lasky
Young Man of Manhattan	Monta Bell	Claudette Colbert, Ginger Rogers, Charles Ruggles	Drama	Paramount-Publix

== See also ==
- 1930 in American television
- 1930 in the United States
