= List of Metro-Goldwyn-Mayer films (1930–1939) =

The following is a list of films originally produced and/or distributed theatrically by Metro-Goldwyn-Mayer and released in the 1930s.

== 1930 ==
Release date	Title	Notes	Video if in the public domain
January 3, 1930	The Bishop Murder Case		
January 24, 1930	The Woman Racket		
January 31, 1930	They Learned About Women	Technicolor sequences	
January 31, 1930	The Ship from Shanghai		
February 2, 1930	Not So Dumb		
February 21, 1930	Anna Christie		
February 23, 1930	Chasing Rainbows	Technicolor sequences	
February 28, 1930	Lord Byron of Broadway	Technicolor sequences	
February 28, 1930	A Lady to Love		
March 15, 1930	The Girl Said No		
March 20, 1930	Montana Moon		
March 22, 1930	Free and Easy		
April 12, 1930	This Mad World		
April 19, 1930	The Divorcee	Nominated for Academy Award for Best Picture	
April 26, 1930	Children of Pleasure	Technicolor sequences	
May 2, 1930	Redemption		
May 3, 1930	Strictly Unconventional		
May 10, 1930	Caught Short	A Cosmopolitan production	
May 10, 1930	The Rogue Song	MGM’s first all-talkie in colour in Technicolor	
May 17, 1930	In Gay Madrid		
May 24, 1930	The Lady of Scandal		
May 30, 1930	The Florodora Girl	A Marion Davies production	
June 14, 1930	The Big House	A Cosmopolitan production Nominated for Academy Award for Best Picture	
June 21, 1930	One Embarrassing Night	US distribution; a Herbert Wilcox production for the British & Dominions Film Corporation	
June 28, 1930	The Sins of the Children	A Cosmopolitan production	
July 5, 1930	The Sea Bat		
July 7, 1930	Estrellados	Spanish-language version of Free and Easy	
July 12, 1930	The Unholy Three		
July 19, 1930	Our Blushing Brides		
August 2, 1930	Way Out West		
August 9, 1930	Let Us Be Gay		
August 16, 1930	Call of the Flesh	Technicolor sequences	
August 23, 1930	Good News	Multicolor sequences	
August 26, 1930	Romance		
August 30, 1930	Doughboys		
September 6, 1930	Love in the Rough		
September 20, 1930	Madam Satan	Multicolor sequences	
September 27, 1930	Men of the North		
October 10, 1930	Olimpia	Spanish-language version of His Glorious Night	
October 11, 1930	Those Three French Girls	A Cosmopolitan production	
October 18, 1930	Billy the Kid		
November 1, 1930	Way for a Sailor		
November 8, 1930	A Lady's Morals		
November 14, 1930	El presidio	Spanish-language version of The Big House	
November 15, 1930	Remote Control		
November 22, 1930	War Nurse		
November 29, 1930	Min and Bill		
December 6, 1930	Passion Flower		
December 18, 1930	Wu Li Chang	Spanish-language version of Mr. Wu	
December 28, 1930	New Moon		
December 30, 1930	Paid		

== 1931 ==
Release date	Title	Notes
January 3, 1931	Reducing	
January 5, 1931	Anna Christie	German-language version
January 10, 1931	The Bachelor Father	A Cosmopolitan production
January 16, 1931	Monsieur Le Fox	Spanish-language version of Men of the North
January 23, 1931	De frente, marchen	Spanish-language version of Doughboys
January 24, 1931	The Great Meadow	
January 31, 1931	Inspiration	
February 7, 1931	Dance, Fools, Dance	
February 7, 1931	The Easiest Way	
February 21, 1931	Si l'empereur savait ça	French-language version of His Glorious Night
February 21, 1931	The Prodigal	
February 28, 1931	Parlor, Bedroom and Bath	
March 7, 1931	Gentleman's Fate	
March 13, 1931	La fruta amarga	Spanish-language version of Min and Bill
March 14, 1931	Men Call It Love	
March 27, 1931	En cada puerto un amor	Spanish-language version of Way for a Sailor
March 28, 1931	A Tailor Made Man	
April 3, 1931	La mujer X	Spanish-language version of Madame X
April 4, 1931	Strangers May Kiss	
April 11, 1931	Stepping Out	
April 11, 1931	It's a Wise Child	A Cosmopolitan production
April 18, 1931	The Secret Six	A George Hill-Cosmopolitan production
April 25, 1931	Shipmates	
May 2, 1931	Daybreak	
May 16, 1931	Never the Twain Shall Meet	
May 23, 1931	Trader Horn	Nominated for Academy Award for Best Picture
May 30, 1931	Laughing Sinners	
June 6, 1931	Just a Gigolo	
June 13, 1931	Five and Ten	A Cosmopolitan production
June 20, 1931	A Free Soul	Academy Award for Best Actor: Lionel Barrymore; Remade in 1953 as The Girl Who Had Everything
June 26, 1931	El proceso de Mary Dugan	Spanish-language version of The Trial of Mary Dugan
July 4, 1931	The Man in Possession	
July 17, 1931	Su última noche	Spanish-language remake of The Gay Deceiver
July 18, 1931	The Great Lover	
July 25, 1931	Politics	
August 1, 1931	Son of India	
August 8, 1931	Sporting Blood	
August 15, 1931	Pardon Us	A Hal Roach Feature
August 22, 1931	Guilty Hands	
August 29, 1931	This Modern Age	
September 5, 1931	The Squaw Man	
September 12, 1931	The Phantom of Paris	
September 26, 1931	Sidewalks of New York	
October 2, 1931	Cheri-Bibi	Spanish-language version of The Phantom of Paris
October 3, 1931	New Adventures of Get Rich Quick Wallingford	
October 10, 1931	Susan Lenox (Her Fall and Rise)	
October 24, 1931	The Sin of Madelon Claudet	
November 7, 1931	The Guardsman	
November 9, 1931	The Champ	Nominated for Academy Award for Best Picture
November 14, 1931	Flying High	
November 21, 1931	Possessed	
November 28, 1931	West of Broadway	
December 5, 1931	The Cuban Love Song	
December 12, 1931	Private Lives	
December 26, 1931	Mata Hari	

== 1932 ==
Release date	Title	Notes
January 2, 1932	Emma	
January 16, 1932	Hell Divers	
January 23, 1932	Lovers Courageous	
February 6, 1932	The Passionate Plumber	
February 13, 1932	The Beast of the City	A Cosmopolitan production
February 20, 1932	Freaks	Inducted into the National Film Registry in 1994
February 27, 1932	Polly of the Circus	A Cosmopolitan production
March 5, 1932	Arsène Lupin	
March 25, 1932	Tarzan the Ape Man	
March 26, 1932	The Wet Parade	
April 9, 1932	But the Flesh Is Weak	
April 24, 1932	Are You Listening	
April 30, 1932	When a Feller Needs a Friend	A Cosmopolitan production
May 14, 1932	Huddle	
May 14, 1932	Letty Lynton	
May 28, 1932	As You Desire Me	
June 4, 1932	New Morals for Old	
June 4, 1932	Night Court	
June 25, 1932	Red-Headed Woman	
July 2, 1932	Unashamed	
July 9, 1932	The Washington Masquerade	
July 16, 1932	Skyscraper Souls	A Cosmopolitan production
August 6, 1932	Downstairs	
August 13, 1932	Speak Easily	
August 27, 1932	Divorce in the Family	
September 1, 1932	Blondie of the Follies	
September 11, 1932	Grand Hotel	Winner of the Academy Award for Best Picture Inducted into the National Film Registry in 2007
September 17, 1932	Pack Up Your Troubles	Presented by Hal Roach (A Hal Roach Comedy)
September 24, 1932	Smilin’ Through	Nominated for Academy Award for Best Picture
October 1, 1932	Kongo	
October 15, 1932	Faithless	
October 22, 1932	Red Dust	Inducted into the National Film Registry in 2006
November 5, 1932	The Mask of Fu Manchu	A Cosmopolitan production
November 7, 1932	Payment Deferred	
November 18, 1932	Prosperity	
December 8, 1932	Flesh	
December 16, 1932	Fast Life	
December 23, 1932	The Son-Daughter	
December 23, 1932	Rasputin and the Empress	
December 30, 1932	Strange Interlude	

== 1933 ==
Release date	Title	Notes
January 20, 1933	The Outsider	US distribution; presented in the UK by Eric Hakim
January 21, 1933	Whistling in the Dark	
February 3, 1933	The Secret of Madame Blanche	
February 10, 1933	What! No Beer?	
February 17, 1933	Men Must Fight	
February 24, 1933	Clear All Wires!	
March 10, 1933	Fast Workers	
March 31, 1933	Gabriel Over the White House	A Cosmopolitan production
April 14, 1933	Today We Live	
April 14, 1933	The White Sister	
April 28, 1933	Looking Forward	
May 5, 1933	The Devil's Brother	
May 12, 1933	The Barbarian	
May 19, 1933	Made on Broadway	
May 26, 1933	Peg o' My Heart	A Cosmopolitan production
June 2, 1933	The Nuisance	
June 9, 1933	Hell Below	
June 16, 1933	Reunion in Vienna	
June 23, 1933	When Ladies Meet	A Cosmopolitan production
June 30, 1933	Midnight Mary	
July 7, 1933	Hold Your Man	
July 14, 1933	Storm at Daybreak	
July 28, 1933	Another Language	
July 28, 1933	The Stranger's Return	
August 4, 1933	Tugboat Annie	
August 25, 1933	Turn Back the Clock	
August 29, 1933	Dinner at Eight	Inducted into the National Film Registry in 2023
September 1, 1933	Beauty for Sale	
September 8, 1933	Penthouse	A Cosmopolitan production
September 15, 1933	Broadway to Hollywood	
September 22, 1933	The Solitaire Man	
September 29, 1933	Stage Mother	
October 6, 1933	Night Flight	
October 13, 1933	Bombshell	
October 20, 1933	Meet the Baron	
October 27, 1933	Day of Reckoning	
November 3, 1933	The Chief	
November 10, 1933	The Prizefighter and the Lady	
November 14, 1933	Eskimo	
November 17, 1933	Christopher Bean	
November 24, 1933	Dancing Lady	
December 1, 1933	Should Ladies Behave	
December 8, 1933	The Women in His Life	
December 22, 1933	Going Hollywood	A Cosmopolitan production
December 26, 1933	Queen Christina	
December 29, 1933	Sons of the Desert	A Hal Roach Comedy Inducted into the National Film Registry in 2012

== 1934 ==
Release date	Title	Notes
January 5, 1934	Fugitive Lovers	
January 26, 1934	You Can't Buy Everything	A Cosmopolitan production
February 2, 1934	This Side of Heaven	
February 16, 1934	The Cat and the Fiddle	
February 23, 1934	The Mystery of Mr. X	
March 9, 1934	The Show-Off	
March 16, 1934	Lazy River	
March 30, 1934	Riptide	
April 6, 1934	Men in White	A Cosmopolitan production
April 10, 1934	Viva Villa!	Nominated for Academy Award for Best Picture
April 13, 1934	Laughing Boy	
April 16, 1934	Tarzan and His Mate	Inducted into the National Film Registry in 2003
May 4, 1934	Manhattan Melodrama	A Cosmopolitan production
May 9, 1934	Sadie McKee	
May 25, 1934	The Thin Man	Nominated for Academy Award for Best Picture Inducted into the National Film Registry in 1997
June 1, 1934	Hollywood Party	
June 8, 1934	Operator 13	A Cosmopolitan production
June 29, 1934	Murder in the Private Car	
July 13, 1934	Stamboul Quest	
July 27, 1934	Paris Interlude	
August 3, 1934	The Girl from Missouri	
August 10, 1934	Straight Is the Way	
August 17, 1934	Treasure Island	
August 24, 1934	Hide-Out	
September 1, 1934	Chained	
September 7, 1934	Have a Heart	
September 14, 1934	Death on the Diamond	
September 21, 1934	The Barretts of Wimpole Street	Nominated for Academy Award for Best Picture; Remade in 1956
September 28, 1934	Outcast Lady	
October 5, 1934	Student Tour	
October 19, 1934	What Every Woman Knows	
November 2, 1934	The Merry Widow	
November 9, 1934	Evelyn Prentice	A Cosmopolitan production
November 23, 1934	The Painted Veil	
November 30, 1934	Babes in Toyland	A Hal Roach production; owned by MGM itself via Orion Pictures since 1997
December 7, 1934	A Wicked Woman	
December 14, 1934	The Gay Bride	
December 21, 1934	The Band Plays On	
December 22, 1934	Sequoia	
December 23, 1934	Forsaking All Others	A W. S. Van Dyke production

== 1935 ==
Release date	Title	Notes
January 4, 1935	Biography of a Bachelor Girl	
January 11, 1935	The Night Is Young	
January 19, 1935	David Copperfield	Nominated for Academy Award for Best Picture
January 25, 1935	Society Doctor	
February 8, 1935	The Winning Ticket	
February 15, 1935	Shadow of Doubt	
February 22, 1935	After Office Hours	
March 1, 1935	Vanessa: Her Love Story	
March 3, 1935	One New York Night	
March 8, 1935	Times Square Lady	
March 15, 1935	The Casino Murder Case	
March 22, 1935	Naughty Marietta	Nominated for Academy Award for Best Picture Inducted into the National Film Registry in 2003
March 23, 1935	West Point of the Air	
April 12, 1935	Baby Face Harrington	
April 19, 1935	Reckless	
April 26, 1935	Mark of the Vampire	
May 3, 1935	Vagabond Lady	A Hal Roach Feature Comedy
May 10, 1935	Age of Indiscretion	
May 17, 1935	The Flame Within	
May 27, 1935	Murder in the Fleet	
May 31, 1935	Public Hero No. 1	
June 14, 1935	No More Ladies	
June 28, 1935	Calm Yourself	
July 6, 1935	Escapade	
July 12, 1935	Mad Love	
July 12, 1935	The Murder Man	
August 2, 1935	Woman Wanted	
August 9, 1935	China Seas	
August 9, 1935	Pursuit	
August 23, 1935	Bonnie Scotland	Presented by Hal Roach
August 30, 1935	Anna Karenina	
August 30, 1935	Here Comes the Band	
September 13, 1935	The Bishop Misbehaves	
September 18, 1935	Broadway Melody of 1936	Nominated for Academy Award for Best Picture
September 27, 1935	O'Shaughnessy's Boy	
October 4, 1935	I Live My Life	
October 11, 1935	It's in the Air	
October 23, 1935	Rendezvous	
November 8, 1935	Mutiny on the Bounty	Winner of the Academy Award for Best Picture; Remade in 1962
November 15, 1935	A Night at the Opera	Inducted into the National Film Registry in 1993
November 22, 1935	The Perfect Gentleman	
December 6, 1935	Ah, Wilderness!	
December 6, 1935	Kind Lady	
December 18, 1935	Whipsaw	
December 20, 1935	Last of the Pagans	
December 27, 1935	A Tale of Two Cities	Nominated for Academy Award for Best Picture

== 1936 ==
Release date	Title	Notes
January 3, 1936	Riffraff	
January 10, 1936	Three Live Ghosts	
January 17, 1936	Exclusive Story	
January 24, 1936	Tough Guy	
February 1, 1936	Rose Marie	
February 14, 1936	The Bohemian Girl	A Hal Roach Feature Comedy
February 15, 1936	The Voice of Bugle Ann	
February 21, 1936	The Garden Murder Case	
February 28, 1936	Wife vs. Secretary	
March 6, 1936	Three Godfathers	
March 17, 1936	Robin Hood of El Dorado	
March 20, 1936	Petticoat Fever	
March 27, 1936	Moonlight Murder	
April 4, 1936	The Unguarded Hour	
April 8, 1936	The Great Ziegfeld	Winner of the Academy Award for Best Picture
April 10, 1936	Small Town Girl	
April 24, 1936	Absolute Quiet	
May 8, 1936	Speed	
May 9, 1936	Neighborhood House	A Hal Roach Comedy - produced as a feature but released as a 2-reel short.
May 15, 1936	The Three Wise Guys	
May 22, 1936	Trouble for Two	
June 5, 1936	Fury	Fritz Lang's first Hollywood film Inducted into the National Film Registry in 1995
June 19, 1936	We Went to College	
June 26, 1936	San Francisco	Nominated for Academy Award for Best Picture
July 10, 1936	The Devil-Doll	
July 20, 1936	Suzy	
July 31, 1936	Women Are Trouble	
August 7, 1936	His Brother's Wife	
August 14, 1936	Piccadilly Jim	
August 20, 1936	Romeo and Juliet	Nominated for Academy Award for Best Picture
August 21, 1936	Kelly the Second	A Hal Roach Feature Comedy
August 28, 1936	The Gorgeous Hussy	A Clarence Brown production
September 11, 1936	Sworn Enemy	
September 18, 1936	The Devil Is a Sissy	
September 25, 1936	Old Hutch	
October 2, 1936	The Longest Night	
October 9, 1936	Libeled Lady	Nominated for Academy Award for Best Picture
October 16, 1936	All American Chump	
October 23, 1936	Mr. Cinderella	Presented by Hal Roach Studios
October 30, 1936	Our Relations	A Hal Roach Feature Comedy
November 6, 1936	Tarzan Escapes	
November 13, 1936	Mad Holiday	
November 20, 1936	Love on the Run	
November 27, 1936	Born to Dance	
December 11, 1936	General Spanky	A Hal Roach Feature Comedy
December 12, 1936	Camille	
December 18, 1936	Sinner Take All	
December 25, 1936	After the Thin Man	

== 1937 ==
Release date	Title	Notes
January 8, 1937	Under Cover of Night	
January 22, 1937	Dangerous Number	
January 26, 1937	April Blossoms/April Romance	US distribution only; produced in the UK by Alliance Films
January 29, 1937	The Good Earth	Presented by The Theatre Guild; Nominated for Academy Award for Best Picture
January 29, 1937	Man of the People	
February 5, 1937	Mama Steps Out	
February 19, 1937	The Last of Mrs. Cheyney	
February 26, 1937	Espionage	
March 12, 1937	A Family Affair	1st entry in the Andy Hardy film series
March 19, 1937	Personal Property	
March 26, 1937	Maytime	
April 2, 1937	Song of the City	
April 9, 1937	Aldebaran	US distribution; produced in Italy by Manenti Film
April 16, 1937	Way Out West	A Hal Roach Feature Comedy, presented by Hal Roach Studios
April 23, 1937	The Good Old Soak	
April 23, 1937	Nobody's Baby	A Hal Roach Feature Comedy
April 30, 1937	Night Must Fall	
May 7, 1937	They Gave Him a Gun	
May 7, 1937	The Thirteenth Chair	
May 11, 1937	Captains Courageous	Nominated for Academy Award for Best Picture
May 21, 1937	Pick a Star	A Hal Roach comedy
June 4, 1937	Parnell	
June 11, 1937	A Day at the Races	
June 18, 1937	Married Before Breakfast	
July 2, 1937	The Emperor's Candlesticks	
July 9, 1937	Between Two Women	
July 16, 1937	Topper	A Hal Roach Feature Comedy
July 23, 1937	Saratoga	
July 30, 1937	London by Night	
August 20, 1937	Broadway Melody of 1938	
August 27, 1937	Bad Guy	
September 1, 1937	The Firefly	
September 3, 1937	Big City	
September 10, 1937	The Women Men Marry	
September 17, 1937	My Dear Miss Aldrich	
October 1, 1937	Madame X	
October 15, 1937	The Bride Wore Red	
October 15, 1937	Double Wedding	
October 22, 1937	Conquest	
October 29, 1937	Live, Love and Learn	
November 12, 1937	The Last Gangster	
November 19, 1937	Navy Blue and Gold	
December 3, 1937	Beg, Borrow or Steal	
December 3, 1937	Thoroughbreds Don't Cry	
December 10, 1937	You're Only Young Once	2nd entry in the Andy Hardy film series
December 14, 1937	Mannequin	A Frank Borzage production
December 24, 1937	Rosalie	
December 31, 1937	The Bad Man of Brimstone	

== 1938 ==
Release date	Title	Notes
January 7, 1938	Man-Proof	
January 14, 1938	Love Is a Headache	
February 4, 1938	Everybody Sing	
February 11, 1938	Of Human Hearts	
February 15, 1938	Paradise for Three	
February 18, 1938	A Yank at Oxford	Made by MGM-British
February 25, 1938	Arsène Lupin Returns	
March 4, 1938	Merrily We Live	Presented by Hal Roach (A Hal Roach Feature Comedy)
March 12, 1938	The First Hundred Years	
March 18, 1938	The Girl of the Golden West	
March 26, 1938	Judge Hardy's Children	3rd entry in the Andy Hardy film series
April 22, 1938	Test Pilot	Nominated for Academy Award for Best Picture
May 13, 1938	Hold That Kiss	
May 19, 1938	Yellow Jack	
May 20, 1938	Swiss Miss	Presented by Hal Roach Studios
June 2, 1938	Three Comrades	
June 10, 1938	The Toy Wife	
June 17, 1938	Lord Jeff	
June 24, 1938	Woman Against Woman	
July 1, 1938	Port of Seven Seas	
July 5, 1938	Fast Company	
July 8, 1938	Marie Antoinette	
July 15, 1938	The Shopworn Angel	
July 22, 1938	Love Finds Andy Hardy	4th entry in the Andy Hardy film series Inducted into the National Film Registry in 2000
July 29, 1938	The Chaser	
August 5, 1938	The Crowd Roars	
August 12, 1938	Rich Man, Poor Girl	
August 19, 1938	Block-Heads	A Hal Roach Feature Comedy
September 2, 1938	Three Loves Has Nancy	
September 9, 1938	Boys Town	Nominated for Academy Award for Best Picture
September 16, 1938	Too Hot to Handle	
September 30, 1938	Vacation from Love	
October 7, 1938	Stablemates	
October 14, 1938	Young Dr. Kildare	1st entry in the Dr. Kildare film series
October 18, 1938	Listen, Darling	
October 29, 1938	The Citadel	made by MGM-British; Nominated for Academy Award for Best Picture
November 4, 1938	The Great Waltz	
November 11, 1938	Spring Madness	
November 18, 1938	The Shining Hour	
November 25, 1938	Out West with the Hardys	
December 2, 1938	Flirting with Fate	Distribution only; produced by David Loew Productions
December 8, 1938	Pygmalion	US distribution; produced in the UK by Gabriel Pascal Productions; Nominated for Academy Award for Best Picture
December 9, 1938	Dramatic School	
December 16, 1938	A Christmas Carol	
December 22, 1938	Sweethearts	MGM's first three-strip Technicolor feature film; first feature film appearance of Tanner the Lion
December 23, 1938	The Girl Downstairs	

== 1939 ==
Release date	Title	Notes
January 6, 1939	Stand Up and Fight	
January 13, 1939	Burn 'Em Up O'Connor	
January 27, 1939	Idiot's Delight	
January 27, 1939	Four Girls in White	
February 3, 1939	Honolulu	
February 10, 1939	The Adventures of Huckleberry Finn	Remade in 1960
February 17, 1939	Fast and Loose	
February 24, 1939	Let Freedom Ring	
March 10, 1939	The Ice Follies of 1939	
March 17, 1939	Within the Law	
March 21, 1939	Society Lawyer	
March 24, 1939	Sergeant Madden	
April 7, 1939	Broadway Serenade	
April 14, 1939	The Kid from Texas	
April 21, 1939	The Hardys Ride High	6th entry in the Andy Hardy film series
April 28, 1939	Calling Dr. Kildare	2nd entry in the Dr. Kildare film series
May 5, 1939	Lucky Night	
May 12, 1939	Tell No Tales	
May 15, 1939	Goodbye, Mr. Chips	Made by MGM-British; Remade as musical in 1969; Nominated for Academy Award for Best Picture
May 19, 1939	It's a Wonderful World	
May 26, 1939	Bridal Suite	
June 9, 1939	6,000 Enemies	
June 15, 1939	Land of Liberty	Distribution only; produced by Motion Picture Producers & Distributors of America; A compilation film for the Golden Gate International Exposition and the 1939 New York World's Fair
June 16, 1939	Tarzan Finds a Son!	
June 22, 1939	Maisie	
June 30, 1939	Stronger Than Desire	
July 6, 1939	On Borrowed Time	
July 21, 1939	Andy Hardy Gets Spring Fever	7th entry in the Andy Hardy film series
August 4, 1939	They All Come Out	
August 10, 1939	Miracles for Sale	
August 11, 1939	Lady of the Tropics	
August 15, 1939	The Wizard of Oz	Nominated for Academy Award for Best Picture; Inducted into the National Film Registry in 1989
August 18, 1939	These Glamour Girls	
August 29, 1939	Ask a Policeman	US distribution only; made in the UK by Gainsborough Pictures
September 1, 1939	The Women	Inducted into the National Film Registry in 2007
September 8, 1939	Blackmail	
September 15, 1939	Thunder Afloat	
September 29, 1939	Dancing Co-Ed	
October 6, 1939	Fast and Furious	
October 13, 1939	Babes in Arms	
October 20, 1939	At the Circus	
October 27, 1939	Bad Little Angel	
November 9, 1939	Ninotchka	Nominated for Academy Award for Best Picture; Remade as musical in 1957 Inducted into the National Film Registry in 1990
November 17, 1939	Another Thin Man	3rd entry in the Thin Man film series
November 24, 1939	The Secret of Dr. Kildare	3rd entry in the Dr. Kildare film series
December 1, 1939	Joe and Ethel Turp Call on the President	
December 8, 1939	Henry Goes Arizona	
December 13, 1939	Nick Carter, Master Detective	
December 15, 1939	Balalaika	
December 15, 1939	Gone with the Wind	Co-produced by Selznick International Pictures; Winner of the Academy Award for Best Picture; Inducted into the National Film Registry in 1989
December 19, 1939	Remember?	
December 22, 1939	Judge Hardy and Son	

== See also ==
- Lists of Metro-Goldwyn-Mayer films
