= The Squaw Man (1931 film) =

1931 film

- Directed by: Cecil B. DeMille
- Screenplay by: Lucien Hubbard; Lenore J. Coffee; Elsie Janis
- Based on: The Squaw Man; 1905 play by Edwin Milton Royle
- Produced by: Cecil B. DeMille
- Starring: Warner Baxter; Lupe Vélez; Eleanor Boardman
- Cinematography: Harold Rosson
- Edited by: Anne Bauchens
- Music by: Herbert Stothart
- Distributed by: Metro-Goldwyn-Mayer
- Release date: September 5, 1931
- Running time: 107 minutes
- Country: United States
- Language: English

The Squaw Man is a 1931 American pre-Code Western film directed by Cecil B. DeMille. It was his third time filming the same play but the first in sound. It stars Warner Baxter in the leading role.

== Plot ==
A British army officer, Captain James Wingate, is left disgraced when he takes the blame for his cousin Henry's misappropriation of the regiment's charitable fund. He is also in love with Henry's wife, Diana, who loves him in return and knows he is innocent and her husband guilty. They both agree he must leave the country to save her marriage and their honour. He heads to the Wild West of the United States, taking over a ranch in Montana.

A local bootlegger, Cash Hawkins, wants James' land as a smuggling route from Mexico, and also tries to force a beautiful Indian woman, Naturich, to his will. James rescues her, earning her gratitude and love; when Cash Hawkins openly comes in to kill him, James does not resist because he is pining over a picture of Lady Diana and wants to die. Naturich shoots Cash dead. The sheriff and his friends are for Cash and against James, but cannot pin Cash's "murder" on James; Naturich goes unsuspected. She follows James home and saves him from two of Cash's friends who shoot and wound him; in gratitude, he lets her stay with him. We later learn that he marries her and they have a son, Hal.

Years later, Henry, who is being unfaithful to Diana, is killed in a hunting accident, and confesses to the theft as he dies. Sir John Applegate, Diana's friend, finds out James' whereabouts and arrives at the ranch with her, on Hal's fifth birthday. The little boy is glorying in the model railroad James' ranch hands have given him and being lukewarm about his mother's handmade wooden horse. James longs desperately to return to England, and is agonized by what might have been with Diana; however, he remains true to Naturich and introduces her as his wife to the surprised guests.

Later, Sir John convinces James to let him take Hal back with him to England, where the boy will be educated in the finest schools and become worthy to inherit the earldom. When her son is taken against her wishes, a grieving Naturich goes to the hills to pray; as Sir John and Diana prepare to leave with Hal, the sheriff and his friends turn up to arrest or shoot Naturich, having – after more than five years of top notch detective work – found her purse at Cash's death scene and realizing that she killed him. Naturich sneaks back in time to see her son depart; she goes into the boy's room, and, as James has a standoff at gunpoint with the sheriff on the front steps, she shoots herself, holding the wooden horse she made for Hal. All hear the shot and rush in, and Naturich dies in James's arms.

== Cast ==
- Warner Baxter as James 'Jim' Wingate, aka Jim Carston
- Lupe Vélez as Naturich
- Eleanor Boardman as Lady Diana Kerhill
- Charles Bickford as Cash Hawkins
- Roland Young as Sir John 'Johnny' Applegate
- Paul Cavanagh as Henry, Earl of Kerhill
- Raymond Hatton as Shorty
- Julia Faye as Mrs. Chichester Jones
- DeWitt Jennings as Sheriff Bud Hardy
- J. Farrell MacDonald as Big Bill (as J. Farrell McDonald)
- Mitchell Lewis as Tabywana
- Dickie Moore as Little Hal Carston
- Victor Potel as Andy
- Lilian Bond as Babs

== Production and release ==
DeMille's two previous versions of the story were released in 1914 and in 1918. DeMille was keen to remake his earlier successes and was the driving force behind the project, at a time when a cycle of big-budget Western films such as In Old Arizona, Billy the Kid and The Big Trail were being released.

The film rights proved difficult and expensive to acquire, as MGM had to negotiate with both Paramount Pictures and Warner Brothers. Many of the scenes were shot on location in Arizona. As the cost of the film escalated, MGM executive Nicholas Schenck tried to abandon the production, but he was persuaded that this would be equally costly to do and the film was finished as planned. It ultimately cost over $722,000 to make and lost nearly $150,000 in its initial release. In spite of its financial losses, and troubled production, the film was well-regarded by critics. This was the last film on DeMille's contract with MGM before he returned to Paramount Pictures. His next work was the enormously successful 1932 film The Sign of the Cross which kick-started his career again.

== Bibliography ==
- Birchard, Robert S. Cecil B. DeMille's Hollywood. University Press of Kentucky, 2004.
