= Gordon Avil =

American cinematographer (1899–1970)

- Born: March 3, 1899; Michigan, United States
- Died: April 25, 1970 (aged 71); Barbados
- Occupation: Cinematographer

Gordon Avil (3 March 1899 – 25 April 1970) was an American cinematographer. He worked in Billy the Kid (1930), The Champ (1931), A Miracle Can Happen (1948), Robot Monster (1953), Shield for Murder (1954), King Dinosaur (1955), Big House, U.S.A. (1955), The Black Sleep (1956) and The Underwater City (1962). According to Robert Clary, he was one of the most patient and endearing people he ever met. He died in April 1970 of a heart attack while on vacation from shooting the TV series Hogan's Heroes.

== Career ==
Avil was the cinematographer on King Vidor's Western Billy the Kid, which M-G-M released on 18 October 1930.

In television, he was director of photography on Hogan's Heroes, beginning with its first season in 1965, and earlier on the Disney series Zorro (1957–1959).

== Bibliography ==
- Durgnat, Raymond; Simmon, Scott (1988). King Vidor, American. University of California Press. p. 382. ISBN 9780520057982.
