= Louis Natheaux =

American actor

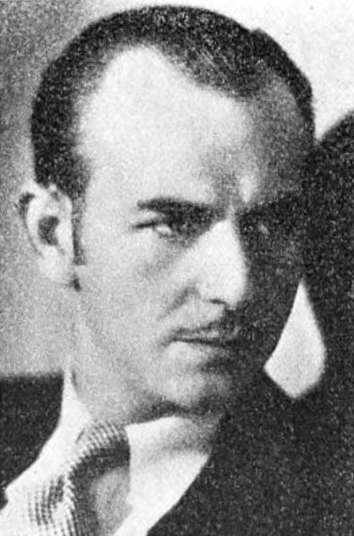
- Born: Louis F. Natho; December 10, 1894; Pine Bluff, Arkansas, U.S.
- Died: August 23, 1942 (aged 47); Los Angeles, California, U.S.
- Occupation: Film actor
- Years active: 1919–1942

Louis Natheaux (born Louis F. Natho; December 10, 1894 – August 23, 1942) was an American film actor. He appeared in more than eighty films between 1919 and 1942.

== Biography ==
Louis F. Natho was born in Pine Bluff, Arkansas on December 10, 1894. (Note: At least one source gives his birthplace as Danville, Illinois.) Under the surname Natheaux, he performed in vaudeville and in a Chautauqua play. His father was William L. Natho; his mother, Anna Louise Natho, was a physician.

Natho and his wife, Neva Patricia Natho, had a daughter.

He died at his home in Los Angeles on August 23, 1942.

== Partial filmography ==
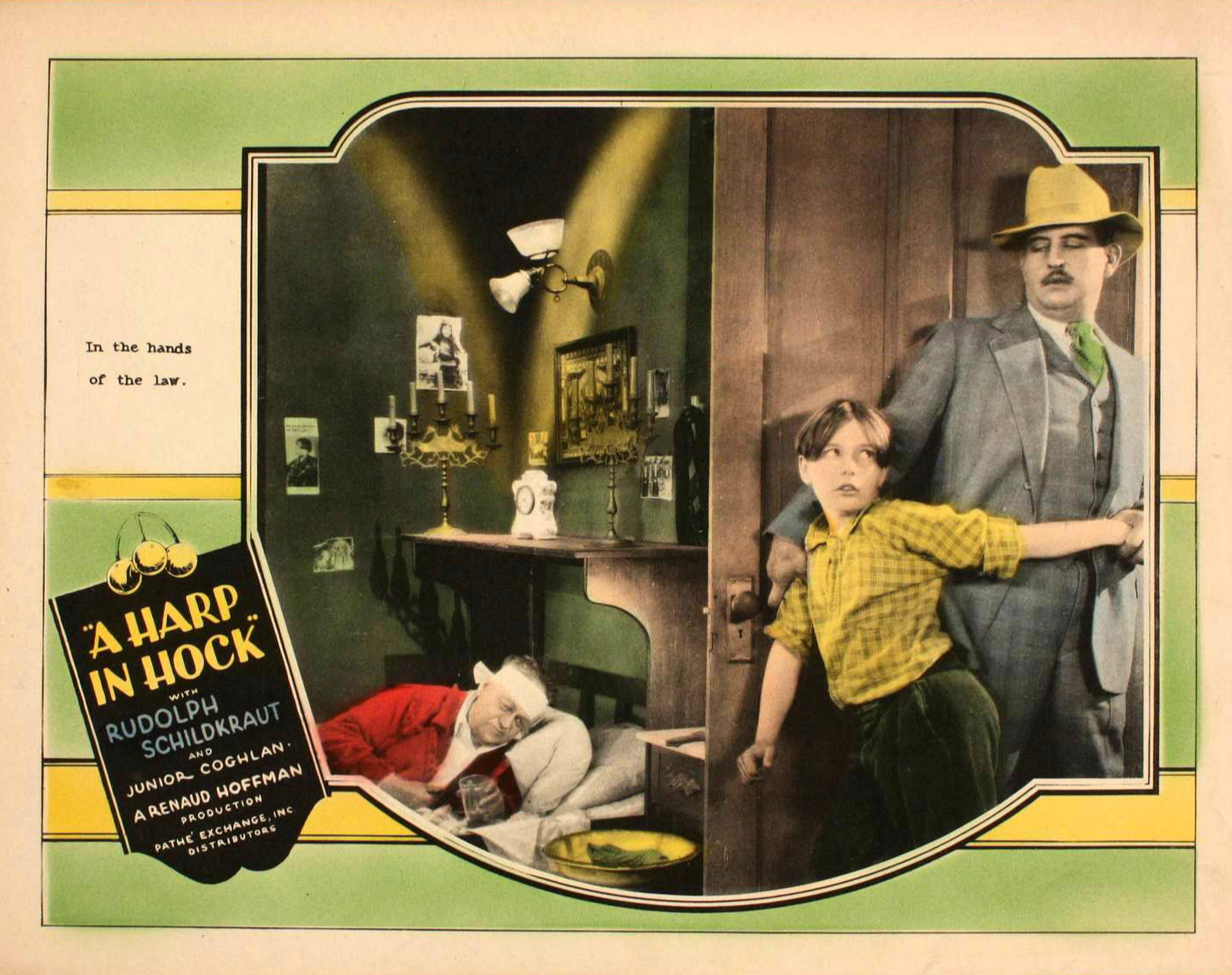
Natheaux (right) on lobby card for the 1927 release A Harp in Hock

- The Super-Sex (1922)
- The Fast Set (1924)
- The Coming of Amos (1925)
- Sunny Side Up (1926)
- The Clinging Vine (1926)
- The Country Doctor (1927)
- Dress Parade (1927)
- Fighting Love (1927)
- Turkish Delight (1927)
- The Cop (1928)
- Stool Pigeon (1928)
- Weary River (1929)
- Why Be Good? (1929)
- Girls Gone Wild (1929)
- Broadway Babies (1929)
- This Mad World (1930)
- Murder on the Roof (1930)
- The Squealer (1930)
- Sinister Hands (1932)
- Behind Jury Doors (1932)
- The Fighting Code (1933)
- Modern Times (1936)
