= Anne Bauchens =

American film editor (1882–1967)

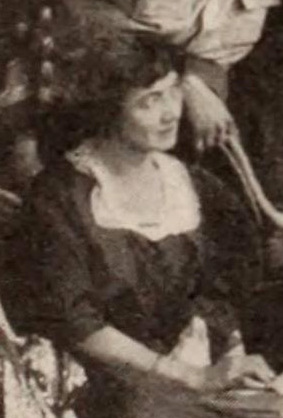
- Bauchens on the set of The Affairs of Anatol (1921)
- Born: Roseanne Bauchens; February 2, 1882; St. Louis, Missouri, U.S.
- Died: May 7, 1967 (aged 85); Woodland Hills, California, U.S.
- Resting place: Hollywood Forever Cemetery
- Awards: Academy Award for Best Film Editing 1940 North West Mounted Police

Anne Bauchens (February 2, 1882 – May 7, 1967) was an American film editor who is remembered for her collaboration over 40 years with the producer-director Cecil B. DeMille.

In 1935, she became the first female nominee for the new Academy Award for Best Film Editing for her work in Cleopatra, which was also nominated for Outstanding Production. In 1941, she was nominated a second time and won for North West Mounted Police (1940), DeMille's first three-strip Technicolor film. She received two more nominations, for the Best Picture winner The Greatest Show on Earth (1952) and the Best Picture nominee The Ten Commandments (1956), her last film.

In 1956, she received the American Cinema Editors Achievement Award for "distinctive achievement in film editing and for outstanding contribution to the film industry over a period of years."

== Personal life ==
Originally Roseanne Bauchens, she was born in St. Louis, Missouri, to Otto Bauchens and Louella McKee. She had a brother named Harry. She never married.

== Hollywood career ==
Bauchens was trained as an editor by DeMille, and shared her first credit with him on the film Carmen (1915). Prior to 1918, DeMille had edited, as well as directed, his films. After Carmen and We Can't Have Everything (1918), Bauchens no longer shared the editing credits with DeMille. She edited DeMille's films for the rest of their long careers, through the film The Ten Commandments (1956).

When the Academy Award for Best Film Editing was created in 1934, Bauchens received one of the three nominations for her editing of Cleopatra. She later won the Academy Award for North West Mounted Police (1940) and became the first woman to win the Oscar in that category. She was nominated for the Academy Award for Film Editing again twice, first for The Greatest Show on Earth (1952) and then for The Ten Commandments (1956). In total, Bauchens is credited with editing on 43 films directed by DeMille and on 20 films with other directors.

In a 1947 newspaper article, Bauchens talked about some of the films she worked on. She said she got her "biggest thrill" from the 1923 version of The Ten Commandments; she considered it her most difficult assignment because DeMille had 16 cameras and shot enough footage for ten films. DeMille thought the Red Sea sequence was too long, but Bauchens convinced him to leave it as it was. She also said she got her "deepest emotional feeling" from The King of Kings (1927), and believed that Unconquered (1947) was DeMille's best frontier film.

In 1956, Bauchens described DeMille as "actually two men in one, all business and strict when he works, and a magnificently gracious and easy host when at leisure. He is a man whose judgment you respect, who knows what he wants, who has temperament and fire but is courteous and who can tell a story better than anyone else."

In his autobiography, DeMille wrote:

I have seen unedited film, played by good actors, directed by a good director from a well-written script, utterly confusing and even meaningless on the screen, until it had passed through the hands of a skilled editor—one like Annie Bauchens.

"Annie B." has edited every one of my pictures since I made We Can't Have Everything in 1918. She will edit every one the Lord gives us time to make in the future. I believe she is the only film editor whose name is written into a producer's contract. […] In every contract I sign to produce a picture one essential clause is that Anne Bauchens will be its editor. That is not sentiment, or at least not only sentiment. She is still the best film editor I know.

== Filmography ==
NOTE: Some films were released/premiered at the end of a given year, but not copyrighted until the beginning of the following year. The sources themselves are inconsistent as to which date they applied to a given film. Either date might be used in the title of its corresponding Wikipedia article.

Anne Bauchens filmography
Year	Title	Notes (as editor unless otherwise noted)	Ref(s)
1915	Carmen	Paramount Pictures	
1918	The Squaw Man	Famous Players Lasky; Editor and director	
1918	We Can't Have Everything	Famous Players Lasky	
1918	Till I Come Back to You	Famous Players Lasky	
1919	For Better, for Worse	Famous Players Lasky	
1919	Male and Female	Famous Players Lasky	
1919	Don't Change Your Husband	Famous Players Lasky	
1920	Why Change Your Wife?	Famous Players Lasky	
1920	Something to Think About	Famous Players Lasky	
1921	Forbidden Fruit	Famous Players Lasky	
1921	The Affairs of Anatol	Famous Players Lasky	
1922	Saturday Night	Famous Players Lasky	
1922	Fool's Paradise	Famous Players Lasky	
1922	Manslaughter	Famous Players Lasky	
1923	Adam's Rib	Famous Players Lasky	
1923	The Ten Commandments	Famous Players Lasky	
1924	Feet of Clay	Famous Players Lasky	
1924	Triumph	Famous Players Lasky	
1925	The Golden Bed	Famous Players Lasky	
1925	The Road to Yesterday	De Mille Pictures Corp.	
1926	The Volga Boatman	Cecil De Mille Pictures Corp.	
1927	The King of Kings	De Mille Pictures Corp.	
1928	Chicago	De Mille Pictures Corp. Copyright and release 1928	
1928	Craig's Wife	Pathé Exchange	
1929	Dynamite	MGM	
1929	The Godless Girl	De Mille Pictures Corp.	
1929	Ned McCobb's Daughter	Pathé Exchange; Copyright November 1928; release January 1929	
1929	Noisy Neighbors	Pathé Exchange	
1930	Lord Byron of Broadway	MGM	
1930	Madam Satan	MGM	
1930	This Mad World	MGM	
1931	The Squaw Man	MGM	
1931	Guilty Hands	MGM	
1932	The Wet Parade	MGM	
1932	The Beast of the City	MGM	
1932	The Sign of the Cross	Paramount Pictures	
1933	Tonight Is Ours	Paramount Pictures	
1933	This Day and Age	Paramount Pictures	
1934	Menace	Paramount Pictures	
1934	Four Frightened People	Paramount Pictures	
1934	Cleopatra	Paramount Pictures	
1935	The Crusades	Paramount Pictures	
1936	The Plainsman	Paramount Pictures; Picture wrapped 1936, copyrighted January 1, 1937	
1937	This Way Please	Paramount Pictures	
1938	The Buccaneer	Paramount Pictures	
1938	Bulldog Drummond in Africa	Paramount Pictures	
1938	Sons of the Legion	Paramount Pictures	
1938	Hunted Men	Paramount Pictures	
1939	Television Spy	Paramount Pictures	
1939	Union Pacific	Paramount Pictures	
1940	North West Mounted Police	Paramount Pictures; Bauchens won the Academy Award for film editing	
1940	Women Without Names	Paramount Pictures	
1942	Mrs. Wiggs of the Cabbage Patch	Paramount Pictures	
1942	Reap the Wild Wind	Paramount Pictures	
1942	Commandos Strike at Dawn	Columbia Pictures; Lester Cowan Productions, Inc.	
1944	The Story of Dr. Wassell	Paramount Pictures	
1944	Tomorrow, the World!	Lester Cowan Productions, Inc.	
1945	Love Letters	Hal Wallis Productions, Inc. Paramount Pictures	
1946	Our Hearts Were Growing Up	Paramount Pictures	
1948	Unconquered	Paramount Pictures; Copyrighted November 4, 1947; released February 4, 1948	
1949	Samson and Delilah	Paramount Pictures	
1952	The Greatest Show on Earth	Paramount Pictures	
1956	The Ten Commandments	Paramount Pictures	

== Bibliography ==
- Birchard, Robert S. S. (2009). Cecil B. DeMille's Hollywood. The University Press of Kentucky. ISBN 978-0-8131-2636-4.(subscription required)
