= The Concentratin' Kid =

1930 film

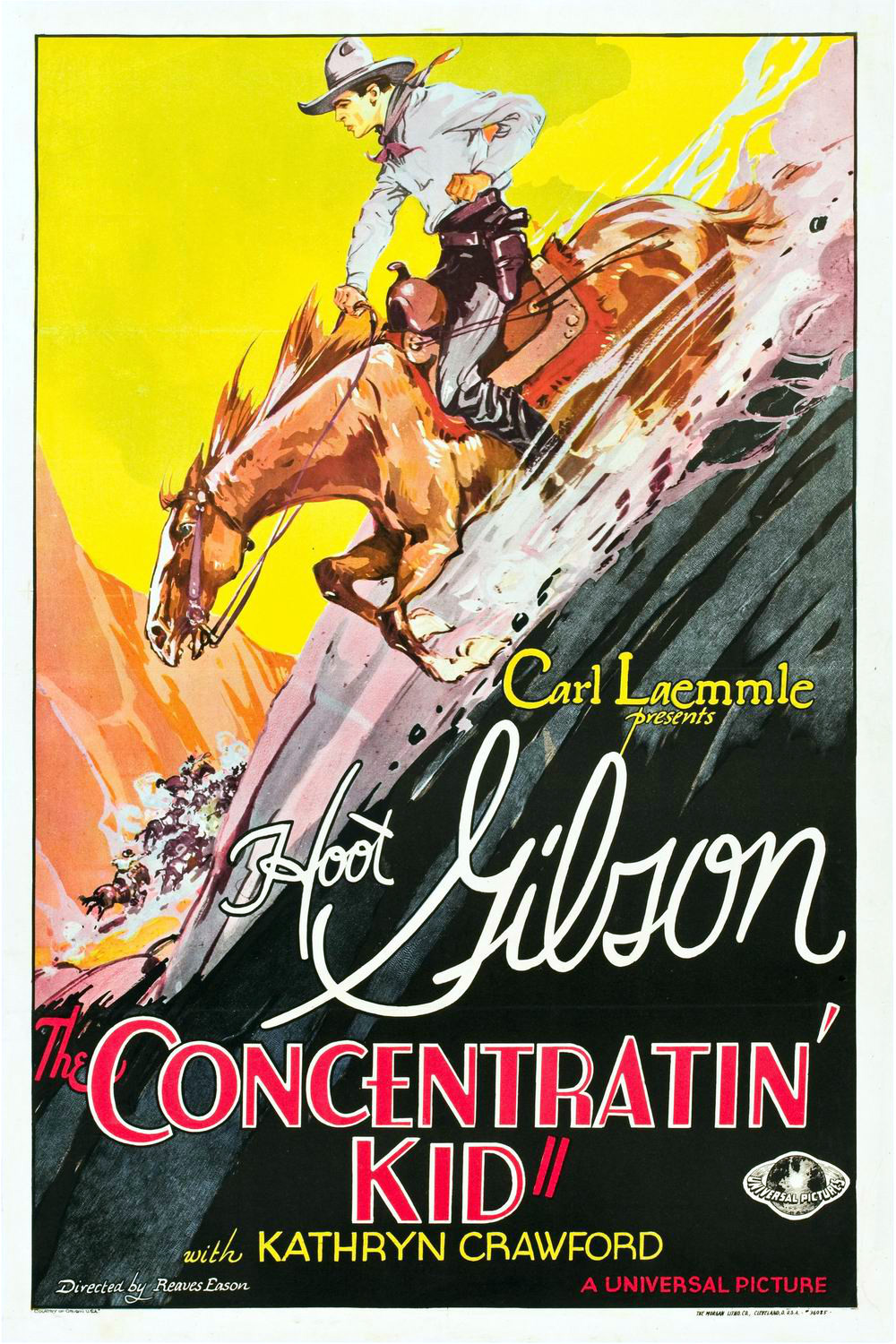
- Theatrical release poster
- Directed by: Arthur Rosson
- Screenplay by: Harold Tarshis
- Story by: Charlie Saxton; Harold Tarshis
- Produced by: Hoot Gibson
- Starring: Hoot Gibson; Kathryn Crawford; Duke R. Lee; Jim Mason; Robert Homans
- Cinematography: Harry Neumann
- Edited by: Gilmore Walker
- Music by: David Broekman
- Production company: Universal Pictures
- Distributed by: Universal Pictures
- Release date: October 26, 1930
- Running time: 57 minutes
- Country: United States
- Language: English

The Concentratin' Kid is a 1930 American Western film directed by Arthur Rosson and written by Harold Tarshis. The film stars Hoot Gibson, Kathryn Crawford, Duke R. Lee, Jim Mason and Robert Homans. The film was released on October 26, 1930, by Universal Pictures.

== Cast ==
- Hoot Gibson as Concentratin' Kid
- Kathryn Crawford as Betty Lou Vaughn
- Duke R. Lee as Boss Blaine
- Jim Mason as Art Campbell
- Robert Homans as C.C. Stile
