= 1930 in American television =

This is a list of American television-related events in 1930.

== Events ==
- January 3 - James Harbord replaces Owen D. Young as the chairman of the board for RCA. David Sarnoff, who was RCA's founding general manager, became the company's third president on the same day.
- Spring - The inventor Vladimir K. Zworykin was hired by the businessman David Sarnoff. Zworykin was put him in charge of television development for the Radio Corporation of America (RCA) at its factories and laboratories in Camden, New Jersey. Zworykin's move to the RCA's Camden laboratories occurred in the spring of 1930. The difficult task of developing a transmitter could begin. There was an in-house evaluation in mid-1930, where the kinescope (cathode ray tube) performed well, but with only 60 lines for definition.
- March 30 - On March 30, Philo Farnsworth applied for a patent for his "electron multiplier". He demonstrated its application in 1931.
- May - In May 1930, the United States Department of Justice brought antitrust charges against RCA, General Electric (GE) and the Westinghouse Electric Corporation, arguing that their cross-licensing agreements had in effect created illegal monopolies.
- August 26 - The inventor Philo Farnsworth was granted his first television patent on August 26, 1930. By that time Farnsworth had moved to San Francisco. He set up his new lab at 202 Green Street.
- Specific date unknown - In 1930, RCA agreed to occupy the yet-to-be-constructed landmark skyscraper of the Rockefeller Center complex, 30 Rockefeller Plaza. In 1933, the building became known as the RCA Building (renamed the GE Building in 1988 and currently known as the Comcast Building after Comcast bought NBC-TV). This lease was critical for enabling the massive project to proceed as a commercially viable venture. David Rockefeller cited RCA's action as being responsible for "the salvation of the project". John D. Rockefeller Jr. quickly negotiated with RCA and its subsidiaries, National Broadcasting Company (NBC) and Radio-Keith-Orpheum(RKO), to build a mass media entertainment complex on the site.

== Sources ==
- Adams, Janet (1985). Rockefeller Center Designation Report (PDF) (Report). City of New York; New York City Landmarks Preservation Commission. Archived from the original (PDF) on November 7, 2017.
- Krinsky, Carol H. (1978). Rockefeller Center. Oxford University Press. ISBN 978-0-19502-404-3.
- Okrent, Daniel (2003). Great Fortune: The Epic of Rockefeller Center. London: Penguin Book. ISBN 978-0-142-00177-6.
