= This Mad World =

1930 film

- Directed by: William C. deMille
- Written by: Clara Beranger; François de Curel (play)
- Starring: Kay Johnson; Basil Rathbone; Louise Dresser
- Cinematography: Peveerell Marley; Hal Rosson
- Edited by: Anne Bauchens
- Distributed by: Metro-Goldwyn-Mayer
- Release date: April 12, 1930
- Running time: 70 minutes
- Country: United States
- Language: English

This Mad World is a 1930 American pre-Code drama film directed by William C. deMille and starring Basil Rathbone, Kay Johnson and Louise Dresser.

The film is based on a French play from 1922 called Terre inhumaine. During production, it was re-titled from Twelve Hours of Love to Inhuman Grounds then subsequently This Mad World.

== Plot ==
In 1938, a French spy goes home and finds an evil German officer killed his family. He then return to his spying carrier to take revenge.

== Cast ==
- Kay Johnson as Victoria
- Basil Rathbone as Paul Parisot
- Louise Dresser as Pauline Parisot - Paul's Mother
- Veda Buckland as Anna
- Louis Natheaux as Emile
- Wilhelm von Brincken as Victoria's husband - the General
