= Harold Rosson =

American cinematographer

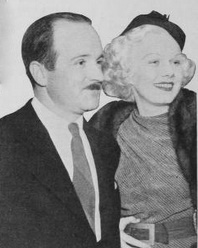
- Rosson with his second wife Jean Harlow (1934)
- Born: Harold G. Rosson; April 6, 1895; New York City, New York, U.S.
- Died: September 6, 1988 (aged 93); Palm Beach, Florida, U.S.
- Resting place: Hollywood Forever Cemetery
- Other names: Hal Rosson
- Occupation: Cinematographer
- Years active: 1908–1958, 1966
- Spouses: Nina Byron (m. 1924; div. 1926) Jean Harlow (m. 1933; div. 1935) Yvonne Crellin (m. 1936; div. 1945)
- Relatives: Arthur Rosson (brother); Richard Rosson (brother); Helene Rosson (sister)

Harold G. "Hal" Rosson, A.S.C. (April 6, 1895 – September 6, 1988) was an American cinematographer who worked during the early and classical Hollywood cinema, in a career spanning some 52 years, starting from the silent era in 1915. He is best known for his work on the fantasy film The Wizard of Oz (1939) and the musical Singin' in the Rain (1952), as well as his marriage to Jean Harlow.

== Family ==
Born in New York City, Rosson came from a film-making family. His older brother Arthur was a successful director as was his other older brother Richard and his younger sister Helene was an actress.

== Career ==
Harold Rosson began his film career in 1908 as an actor at the Vitagraph Studios in the Flatbush area of Brooklyn. He became the assistant to Irvin Willat at the Mark Dintenfass Studios. In 1912 he divided his time as an office boy in a stockbrokers firm and as an assistant, extra, and handyman at the Famous Players Studio in New York. His first film for Famous Players was David Harum (1915).

In December 1914, Rosson moved to California and joined Metro Pictures. During World War I, he served in the United States Army. After his demobilization, he went to work on the Marion Davies film The Dark Star. He was offered a contract with the Davies Company. In 1920 he was signed by Mary Pickford working primarily with her brother Jack Pickford. In the 1930s, Rosson signed with Metro-Goldwyn-Mayer and directed the photography for some of the studios most popular films including Treasure Island (1934), The Wizard of Oz (1939), On the Town (1949) and Singin' in the Rain (1952). In 1936, Rosson and fellow cinematographer W. Howard Greene were awarded an Honorary Oscar for the color cinematography of the 1936 David O. Selznick production The Garden of Allah. Rosson later said it was the first time he attempted to film in color.

After a very long and successful career in Hollywood, Rosson retired in 1958. He briefly came out of retirement for the Howard Hawks film El Dorado (1966) starring John Wayne.

== Personal life ==
Rosson was married three times, with all of his marriages ending in divorce, and had no children. His first marriage was to actress Nina Byron, which lasted from 1924 to 1926. While shooting the film Bombshell in 1933, actress Jean Harlow proposed to Rosson. They had worked together previously on Red-Headed Woman, Dinner at Eight, Hold Your Man and Red Dust and had struck up a friendship. On September 17, 1933, the couple married in Yuma, Arizona. In an interview with Leicester Wagner, Harlow recalled that she and Rosson grew closer after the death of her second husband, M-G-M producer Paul Bern, and he encouraged her to go out and socialize. Rosson and Harlow separated in May 1934 with Harlow charging that Rosson was "rude, sullen and irritable". She was granted a divorce in March 1935.

His third and final marriage was socialite Yvonne Crellin. They married on October 11, 1936, in Beverly Hills. They divorced in June 1945.

== Death ==
On September 6, 1988, Rosson died at his home in Palm Beach, Florida. He is buried in Hollywood Forever Cemetery.

== Awards and nominations ==
Harold Rosson was nominated for five Academy Awards: The Wizard of Oz (1939), Boom Town (1940), Thirty Seconds Over Tokyo (1944), The Asphalt Jungle (1950), The Bad Seed (1956).

Rosson was awarded an Honorary Oscar for the color cinematography of David O. Selznick production The Garden of Allah (1936).

== Selected filmography ==
=== Short subject ===
- That Mothers Might Live (1938)

=== Television ===
- Cheyenne (1 episode, 1956)
- Conflict (1 episode, 1956)

=== Features ===
- David Harum (1915)
- Oliver Twist (1916)
- The Victoria Cross (1916)
- The American Consul (1917)
- Polly of the Storm Country (1920)
- Buried Treasure (1921)
- Everything for Sale (1921)
- Through a Glass Window (1922)
- Dark Secrets (1923)
- Zaza (1923)
- Garrison's Finish (1923)
- A Society Scandal (1924)
- Manhattan (1924)
- Too Many Kisses (1925)
- Infatuation (1925)
- The Little French Girl (1925)
- The Street of Forgotten Men (1925)
- Classified (1925)
- For Wives Only (1926)
- Up in Mabel's Room (1926)
- Getting Gertie's Garter (1927)
- Evening Clothes (1927, Lost)
- Rough House Rosie (1927, Lost)
- A Gentleman of Paris (1927)
- Gentlemen Prefer Blondes (1928, Lost)
- The Sawdust Paradise (1928)
- The Docks of New York (1928)
- Three Weekends (1928)
- The Case of Lena Smith (1929, Lost)
- Frozen Justice (1929, Lost)
- South Sea Rose (1929, Lost)
- Madam Satan (1930)
- Passion Flower (1930)
- Son of India (1931)
- The Squaw Man (1931)
- Tarzan the Ape Man (1932)
- Kongo (1932)
- Hell Below (1933)
- Turn Back the Clock (1933)
- The Girl from Missouri (1934)
- The Scarlet Pimpernel (1934)
- Treasure Island (1934)
- The Ghost Goes West (1935)
- As You Like It (1936)
- The Devil Is a Sissy (1936)
- The Man Who Could Work Miracles (1936)
- They Gave Him a Gun (1937)
- Captains Courageous (1937)
- The Emperor's Candlesticks (1937)
- Double Wedding (1937, Uncredited)
- A Yank at Oxford (1938)
- Too Hot to Handle (1938)
- The Wizard of Oz (1939)
- I Take This Woman (1940)
- Edison, the Man (1940)
- Boom Town (1940)
- Dr. Kildare Goes Home (1940)
- Flight Command (1940)
- Honky Tonk (1941)
- The Chocolate Soldier (1941, Uncredited)
- Johnny Eager (1941)
- Tortilla Flat (1942, Uncredited)
- Somewhere I'll Find You (1942)
- Tennessee Johnson (1942)
- Slightly Dangerous (1943)
- Marriage Is a Private Affair (1944)
- An American Romance (1944)
- Thirty Seconds Over Tokyo (1944)
- Duel in the Sun (1946)
- No Leave, No Love (1946)
- Three Wise Fools (1946)
- My Brother Talks to Horses (1947)
- Living in a Big Way (1947)
- The Hucksters (1947)
- Homecoming (1948)
- Command Decision (1948)
- The Stratton Story (1949)
- Any Number Can Play (1949)
- On the Town (1949)
- Key to the City (1950)
- The Asphalt Jungle (1950)
- To Please a Lady (1950)
- The Red Badge of Courage (1951)
- Lone Star (1952)
- Love Is Better Than Ever (1952)
- Singin' in the Rain (1952)
- The Story of Three Loves (1953)
- I Love Melvin (1953)
- Dangerous When Wet (1953)
- The Actress (1953)
- Mambo (1954)
- Ulysses (1954)
- Strange Lady in Town (1955)
- Pete Kelly's Blues (1955)
- The Bad Seed (1956)
- Toward the Unknown (1956)
- No Time for Sergeants (1958)
- Onionhead (1958)
- El Dorado (1966)
