= Kay Johnson =

American actress (1904–1975)

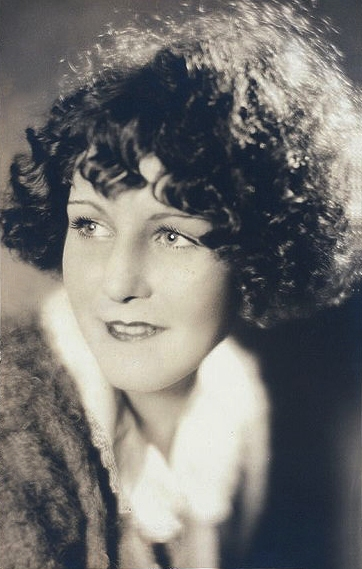
- Born: Catherine Townsend Johnson; November 29, 1904; Mount Vernon, New York, U.S.
- Died: November 17, 1975 (aged 70); Waterford, Connecticut, U.S.
- Education: American Academy of Dramatic Arts
- Occupation: Actress
- Years active: 1929–1954
- Spouse: John Cromwell (m. 1928; div. 1946)
- Children: 2, including James Cromwell

Catherine Townsend Johnson (November 29, 1904 – November 17, 1975) was an American stage and film actress.

== Family ==
Johnson’s father was architect Thomas R. Johnson, the architect of several noteworthy buildings in New York City, including the Woolworth Building, the New York Customs House, and many library buildings. When she was a junior, she dropped out of Grew Seminary to study at the American Academy of Dramatic Arts.

== Career ==
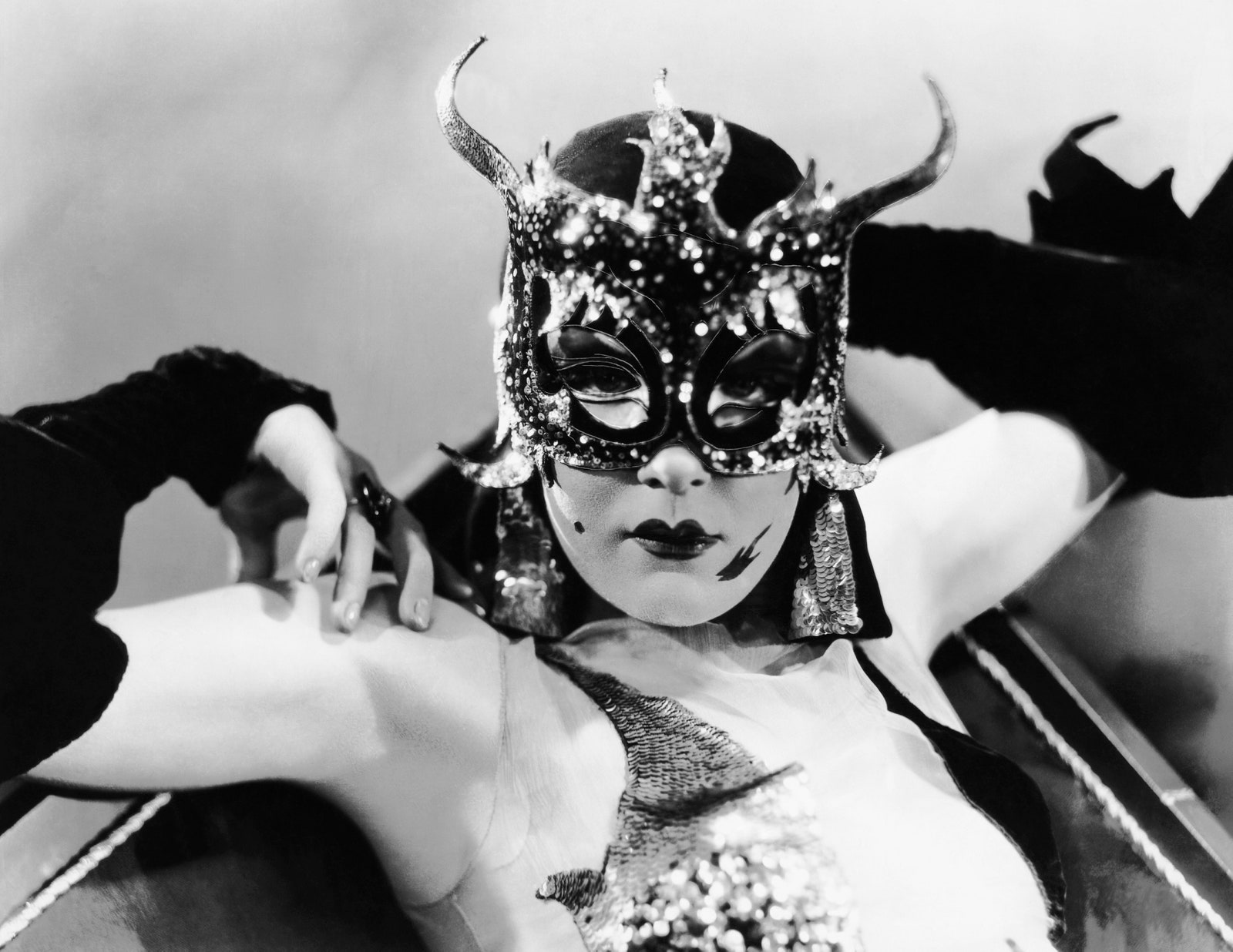
Kay Johnson in Madam Satan, 1930

=== Stage ===
Johnson's professional acting debut was in Beggar on Horseback, and she acted in R.U.R. in Chicago.

Johnson's Broadway credits included State of the Union (1945), A Free Soul (1928), Crime (1927), No Trespassing (1926), One of the Family (1925), All Dressed Up (1925), The Morning After (1925), Beggar on Horseback (1925), Beggar on Horseback (1924), and Go West, Young Man (1923).

=== Films ===
Johnson was signed to a contract with Metro-Goldwyn-Mayer by Cecil B. DeMille following a performance of The Silver Cord at the Repertory Theater in Los Angeles, California. The play was produced by Simeon Gest of the Figueroa Playhouse. Her film debut came in Dynamite (1929), written by Jeanie Macpherson and featuring Charles Bickford and Conrad Nagel. Production was delayed while Johnson recovered from an appendectomy.

She went on to appear in The Ship from Shanghai (1930), This Mad World (1930), Billy the Kid (1930), The Spoilers (1930) with Gary Cooper and Betty Compson, DeMille's Madam Satan (1930), Passion Flower (1930), Capra's American Madness (1932), Thirteen Women (1932), Of Human Bondage (1934, which starred Leslie Howard and Bette Davis), Jalna (1935) and Mr. Lucky (1943). Johnson was cast opposite Warner Baxter in a screen adaptation of Such Men Are Dangerous by Elinor Glyn. The story was adapted to the screen by Fox Film.

Johnson's final film appearance was in the 1954 British film Jivaro (also known as Lost Treasure of the Amazon).

== Personal life and death ==
Johnson married actor, director, and producer John Cromwell, and they had a son, actor James Cromwell. Johnson and Cromwell divorced.

On November 17, 1975, Johnson died from a heart attack at her home in Waterford, Connecticut.

== Partial filmography ==
Year	Film	Role	Notes
1929	Dynamite	Cynthia Crothers	
1930	The Ship from Shanghai	Dorothy Daley	
1930	This Mad World	Victoria	
1930	The Spoilers	Helen Chester	
1930	Madam Satan	Angela Brooks/Madame Satan	
1930	Billy the Kid	Claire Randall	
1930	Passion Flower	Katherine Pringle 'Cassy' Wallace	
1931	The Single Sin	Kate Adams	
1931	The Spy	Anna Turin	
1932	American Madness	Mrs. Phyllis Dickson	
1932	Thirteen Women	Helen Dawson Frye	
1934	Eight Girls in a Boat	Hannah	
1934	This Man Is Mine	Bee McCrea	
1934	Of Human Bondage	Norah	
1934	Their Big Moment	Eve Farrington	
1935	Village Tale	Janet Stevenson	
1935	Jalna	Alayne Archer Whiteoak	
1938	White Banners	Mrs. Marcia Ward	
1939	The Real Glory	Mrs. Mable Manning	
1942	Son of Fury: The Story of Benjamin Blake	Helena Blake	
1943	Mr. Lucky	Mrs. Mary Ostrander	
1944	The Adventures of Mark Twain	Jane Clemens	Uncredited
1954	Jivaro	Umari	Uncredited

== Notes ==
- Los Angeles Times, "Demille Features Child Actor", January 17, 1929, Page A10.
- Los Angeles Times, "Kay Johnson Under Knife", March 3, 1929, Page C15.
- Los Angeles Times, "Kay Johnson Continues", May 30, 1929, Page A6.
- Los Angeles Times, "Kay Johnson, as Genteel Heroine of Cecil B. DeMille, Plays First Screen Role", July 21, 1929, Page B13.
