= Murder on the Roof =

1930 film

- Film poster
- Directed by: George B. Seitz
- Written by: Edward Dougherty; F. Hugh Herbert
- Produced by: Harry Cohn
- Starring: Dorothy Revier
- Cinematography: Joseph Walker
- Edited by: Robert Jahns
- Distributed by: Columbia Pictures
- Release date: January 29, 1930
- Running time: 55 minutes
- Country: United States
- Language: English

Murder on the Roof is a 1930 American pre-Code mystery film directed by George B. Seitz.

== Cast ==
- Dorothy Revier as Molly
- Raymond Hatton as Drinkwater
- Margaret Livingston as Marcia
- David Newell as Ted Palmer
- Paul Porcasi as Joe Carozzo
- Virginia Brown Faire as Monica
- William V. Mong as Anthony Sommers
- Louis Natheaux as Victor
- Fred Kelsey as Ryan
- Richard Cramer as Joe Larkin
