= The Ship from Shanghai =

1930 film

- Theatrical release poster
- Directed by: Charles Brabin
- Screenplay by: John Howard Lawson
- Based on: Ordeal by Dale Collins
- Starring: Conrad Nagel; Kay Johnson; Carmel Myers; Holmes Herbert; Zeffie Tilbury
- Cinematography: Ira H. Morgan
- Edited by: Grant Whytock
- Music by: William Axt
- Production company: Metro-Goldwyn-Mayer
- Distributed by: Metro-Goldwyn-Mayer
- Release date: January 31, 1930
- Running time: 67 minutes
- Country: United States
- Language: English

The Ship from Shanghai is a 1930 Pre-Code American action film directed by Charles Brabin and written by John Howard Lawson. The film stars Conrad Nagel, Kay Johnson, Carmel Myers, Holmes Herbert and Zeffie Tilbury. The film was released on January 31, 1930, by Metro-Goldwyn-Mayer. The September 14, 1929 issue of "Loew's Weekly" claimed that it was the first all-talking picture to be made entirely at sea, "a special yacht having been outfitted with sound-absorbent material, from the captain's cabin to the keel, for this purpose. This yacht will be demolished in the climactic episode of the film."

== Plot ==
On a yacht sailing from Shanghai to the United States carrying wealthy socialites, the sailors, led by a megalomaniac steward, revolt and take control of the ship.

== Cast ==
- Conrad Nagel as Howard Vazey
- Kay Johnson as Dorothy Daley
- Carmel Myers as Viola Thorpe
- Holmes Herbert as Paul Thorpe
- Zeffie Tilbury as Lady Daley
- Louis Wolheim as Ted
- Ivan Linow as Pete
- Jack McDonald as Reid
