= Billy the Kid (1930 film) =

1930 film by King Vidor

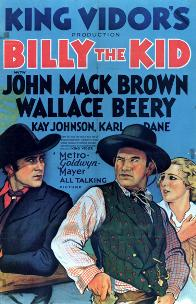
- Directed by: King Vidor
- Written by: Walter Noble Burns (book, The Saga of Billy the Kid); Wanda Tuchock (continuity); Laurence Stallings (dialogue); Charles MacArthur (additional dialogue)
- Produced by: King Vidor; Irving Thalberg
- Starring: John Mack Brown; Wallace Beery; Kay Johnson
- Cinematography: Gordon Avil
- Edited by: Hugh Wynn
- Distributed by: Metro-Goldwyn-Mayer
- Release date: October 18, 1930
- Running time: 95 minutes
- Country: United States
- Language: English

Billy the Kid is a 1930 American pre-Code Western film directed in widescreen by King Vidor about the relationship between frontier outlaw Billy the Kid (Johnny Mack Brown, billed as "John Mack Brown" during his brief career peak) and lawman Pat Garrett (Wallace Beery). In February 2020, the film was shown at the 70th Berlin International Film Festival, as part of a retrospective dedicated to King Vidor's career.

== Plot ==
Billy the Kid (1930)

Billy, after shooting down land baron William Donovan's henchmen for killing Billy's boss, is hunted down and captured by his friend, Sheriff Pat Garrett. He escapes and is on his way to Mexico when Garrett, recapturing him, must decide whether to bring him in or to let him go.

== Cast ==
- John Mack Brown as Billy the Kid
- Wallace Beery as Deputy Sheriff Pat Garrett
- Kay Johnson as Claire Randall
- Karl Dane as Swenson
- Wyndham Standing as Jack Tunston
- Russell Simpson as Angus McSween
- Blanche Friderici as Mrs McSween (as Blanche Frederici)
- Roscoe Ates as Old Stuff
- Warner Richmond as Bob Ballinger
- James A. Marcus as Colonel William P. Donovan
- Nelson McDowell as Track Hatfield
- Jack Carlyle as Dick Brewer
- John Beck as Butterworth
- Chris-Pin Martin as Don Esteban Santiago
- Aggie Herring as Emily Hatfield

== Production ==
Directed by King Vidor, the movie was filmed in an early widescreen process called Realife, a 70mm format similar to Fox Film Corporation's Grandeur used for the lavish The Big Trail the same year.

While The Big Trail, starring John Wayne, has been restored so that the 1930 widescreen process can be evaluated by modern viewers, no widescreen prints of Billy the Kid are known to currently exist and the movie can be viewed only in a standard-width version that was filmed simultaneously with the widescreen version. The widescreen format did not get a commercial foothold with movie-going audiences until The Robe two decades later, largely because the Depression was under way by 1930 and few theatres could afford to upgrade their equipment after just converting to sound.

In some newspaper ads, the more familiar Beery, a major star and frequent supporting player since the teens during the silent era, was accorded top billing over young Brown but not in the main posters. Within two years Beery had contractually become MGM's highest-paid actor while John Mack Brown was rechristened "Johnny Mack Brown" and demoted into B-Westerns after the studio reshot a film called Laughing Sinners with Brown originally cast as the leading man, replacing him with Clark Gable.

This was Wallace Beery's first picture after The Big House rejuvenated his career. Irving Thalberg of Metro-Goldwyn-Mayer had chosen Beery for the role of "Butch" in The Big House after Lon Chaney, who had been previously cast in the part, was diagnosed with terminal cancer. The Big House was a smash hit with Beery nominated for an Academy Award (which he would win the following year for The Champ). Beery was then cast by Thalberg in the lavish widescreen version of Billy the Kid, shot on location in the West similarly to Raoul Walsh's spectacular 1930 widescreen Western The Big Trail, John Wayne's amazing debut as the star of a picture.

Parts of Billy the Kid were shot in Zion National Park, as well as in Gallup, New Mexico, the Grand Canyon, and in Porter Ranch and the San Fernando Valley.

== Remakes ==
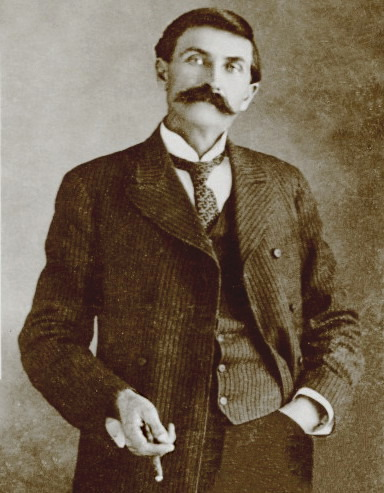
The real Pat Garrett

The film was remade in color in 1941 as Billy the Kid with Robert Taylor as Billy and Brian Donlevy as a fictionalized version of Pat Garrett. The Howard Hughes version two years later, called The Outlaw and mainly serving as an introductory vehicle for Jane Russell, owes at least as much to the 1930 film, particularly in the casting of Thomas Mitchell, who physically resembles Wallace Beery, as Garrett.

Films and television revisited the Pat Garrett-Billy the Kid relationship almost continuously in subsequent decades. Paul Newman played Billy in the '50s in The Left Handed Gun (for many years after Billy's death it was thought he was left-handed. This assumption was based on a photo that had been inadvertently flipped when printed. Billy was right handed); a television series was filmed in 1960 with the same theme called The Tall Man, with Barry Sullivan as Garrett and Clu Gulager as Billy; Sam Peckinpah directed a movie version, Pat Garrett and Billy the Kid, in 1973 with James Coburn as Garrett and Kris Kristofferson as Billy; and Val Kilmer played Billy in Gore Vidal's Billy the Kid, a lavish television version written by Gore Vidal and televised in 1989.

== See also ==
- List of American films of 1930
