= Passion Flower (1930 film) =

1930 film

- Directed by: William C. deMille (uncredited)
- Written by: Martin Flavin (adaptation and dialogue); L. E. Johnson (additional dialogue); Edith Fitzgerald (additional dialogue)
- Based on: Passion Flower; 1930 novel by Kathleen Norris
- Produced by: William C. deMille (uncredited)
- Starring: Kay Francis; Kay Johnson; Charles Bickford
- Cinematography: Hal Rosson
- Edited by: Conrad A. Nervig
- Production company: Metro-Goldwyn-Mayer
- Release date: December 6, 1930
- Running time: 78 minutes
- Country: United States
- Language: English

Passion Flower is a 1930 American pre-Code drama film directed and produced by William C. deMille and starring Kay Francis, Kay Johnson and Charles Bickford in a romantic triangle. This production includes actor Ray Milland's American screen debut, although his appearance as a party guest is uncredited.

== Plot ==
Passion Flower (1930)

Wealthy socialite Dulce Morado is close to her cousin, Katherine ("Cassy") Pringle. One day, Cassy tells Dulce that she has fallen in love with Dan, the family chauffeur. Cassy's furious father, Leroy, kicks her out of the house. Dulce opens her home to the couple so they can marry the next day.

Dulce and her much older husband, Tony, purchase a small farm as a wedding present for Cassy and Dan. However, Dan's pride will not allow him to take what he considers to be a handout. Dan and Cassy head into the city where they rent a small attic apartment in a boarding house run by Mrs. Harney. It is not much, but Cassy tells Dan that she is happy. Dan quickly finds a job down at the docks.

The film flashes forward to their fifth wedding anniversary. They have two children, a toddler named Tommy and an infant girl, Margaret. Dan has been promoted to assistant foreman, but times are still tough and they still live in the attic. Dulce is visiting when Mrs. Harney tells them that a young boy who lived in the building has died after being hit by a truck. The boy was a playmate of Tommy's. Dulce questions why Cassy and Dan will not just accept the ranch, which she has kept for them. Cassy wants to go, but she feels that Dan is still too proud. Meanwhile, Dan loses his job. When he goes home, he and Dulce get into a brief argument. Later though, Dan looks at Tommy sleeping in his highchair and has a change of heart.

They move to the ranch. Mrs. Harney comes with them as their housekeeper. From the very first day, Tony pays attention to the exchanges between Dulce and Dan. He suspects there may be more to that relationship than the two are letting on.

The family settles in to ranch life, but eventually Dulce and Dan share an intimate moment. Tony finds out. He implores his wife to not break up Cassie and Dan's marriage. Dulce gets upset and asks Tony why she cannot have some happiness in her life. Dulce and Dan consider running away together, but Dan is torn. He finally goes to Dulce's house to end the relationship. At the same time, Cassy receives a phone call that her father is very ill. She goes to Dulce's place to ask for a ride to the ferry. Unseen, she sees Dan and Dulce kissing through the glass door. After he leaves to get the car, Cassy confronts Dulce. Dulce begs Cassy to forgive her, but Cassy will not hear it. In the car, Dan also confesses to Cassy what happened. Cassy is devastated; she kicks Dan out of the house.

The film cuts to Dulce and Dan hosting a raucous party. A letter from Cassy arrives. In it, Cassy says, "I can't be proud any longer, dear. If you ever want to come back to us, there is nothing I can't forgive and forget." When Dulce finds out, she asks Dan if he has been happy with her. He says he has, but he cannot go on like this "indefinitely - playing around like we do". He wants to get a job and be useful. They return by ship. While on board, Dulce receives a telegram that Tony has died. She tells Dan, "We can be married now."

But Dan is still torn. A few weeks after their return, he still has not made any move to divorce Cassy. Dulce goes and sees Cassy herself. Dulce tells Dan that Cassy has agreed to the divorce, but requests Dan ask her for it himself. Dan arrives at the ranch to find his children playing outside. Tommy is excited to see his father and runs to him, but Margaret does not know who he is. The three go inside, and Dan and Cassy talk. Suddenly, Dulce arrives. They argue, but eventually, Dulce realizes she has lost and leaves.

== Cast ==
- Kay Francis as Dulce Morado
- Kay Johnson as Katherine Pringle Wallace
- Charles Bickford as Dan Wallace
- Winter Hall as Leroy Pringle
- Lewis Stone as Antonio Morado
- ZaSu Pitts as Mrs. Harney
- Dickie Moore as Tommy
- Ray Milland as party guest (uncredited)

== Reception ==
New York Times critic Mordaunt Hall praised the performances of most of the credited cast, particularly Kay Francis. However, he wrote the film was dragged by "strained psychology, strangely vacillating characters and uneven dialogue."
