= Madam Satan =

1930 film

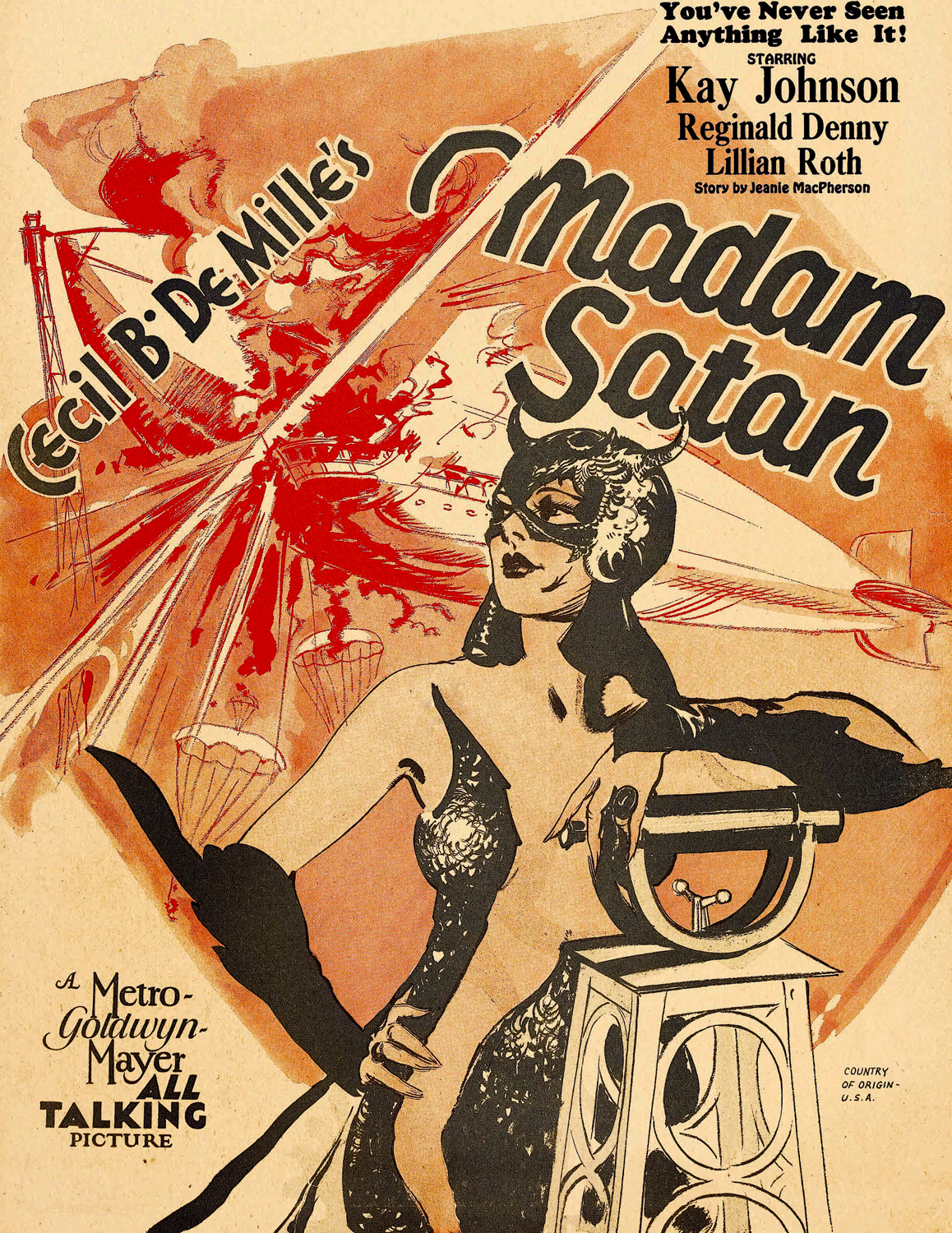
- Theatrical release poster
- Directed by: Cecil B. DeMille
- Written by: Dialogue: Gladys Unger; Elsie Janis
- Screenplay by: Jeanie MacPherson
- Produced by: Cecil B. DeMille
- Starring: Kay Johnson; Reginald Denny; Lillian Roth; Roland Young
- Cinematography: Harold Rosson
- Edited by: Anne Bauchens
- Music by: (see "Music" below)
- Production company: Metro-Goldwyn-Mayer
- Distributed by: Loew's Inc.
- Release date: September 20, 1930 (US)
- Running time: 116 minutes
- Country: United States
- Language: English

Madam Satan or Madame Satan is a 1930 American pre-Code musical comedy film in black and white with Multicolor sequences. It was produced and directed by Cecil B. DeMille and starred Kay Johnson, Reginald Denny, Lillian Roth, and Roland Young.

Madam Satan has been called one of the oddest films DeMille made and certainly one of the oddest MGM made during the Golden Age of Hollywood. Thematically, this marked an attempt by DeMille to return to the boudoir comedies genre that had brought him financial success about 10 years earlier.

== Plot ==
Madam Satan (1930)

The first 50 minutes present four characters' relationships, with the next 1 hour and 10 minutes set on a Zeppelin trip.

One morning after awakening to discover her husband Bob never returned home last night, socialite Angela Brooks reads in the newspaper that Bob and a woman named "Mrs. Brooks" were in night court together along with Bob's best friend Jimmy Wade. The woman is actually a showgirl Bob has been seeing named Trixie, but Bob claims that Trixie is Jimmy's new wife.

Angela is more amused than angered by the clumsy lies, but it soon becomes clear that Bob has lost interest in their marriage, as he feels Angela has become staid and cold. They each declare that they are moving out and leaving the other, but Angela instantly repents. Her maid encourages her to fight for her happiness.

Angela tells Jimmy that she has left home and will spend the night at the apartment he shares with his supposed wife Trixie. Trixie doesn't know about Bob's lie, so Jimmy rushes to her apartment to warn her. Trixie is displeased because she wants Bob all to herself. But when Angela arrives they reluctantly pretend to be married while Angela tries to trick them into revealing the truth. The scene becomes more farcical when Bob arrives as well, while Trixie is hiding; Jimmy conceals Angela under a blanket and says she is his girlfriend, a married woman whose name he will not reveal. Trixie reenters so that Bob will know the woman is not her.

After the men leave, Trixie observes that Angela was caught in her own trap. She says that the difference between them is that Trixie understands the things that a man wants in a woman, and as long as she gives them to Bob, he will stay with her. Angela takes that as a challenge and says she can outdo whatever Trixie is capable of doing.

An elaborate masquerade ball is to be held by Jimmy aboard a moored rigid airship, the Zeppelin CB-P-55. To win back her husband's affections, Angela decides to attend the soiree as a mysterious devil woman with a French accent, "Madam Satan", to "vamp" him. Now hidden behind her mask and wrapped in an alluring gown that reveals more than it covers, Angela finds her errant husband and begins teaching him a lesson.

To Trixie's dismay, Bob is indeed bewitched by Angela in her devil woman persona, nothing like the demure spouse he left at home. During the ball, several exotic musical numbers are performed. A severe thunderstorm quickly moves in, and the airship is damaged and breaks free and now in danger of breaking apart. Everyone begins to panic as they are told to abandon ship and parachute to the ground.

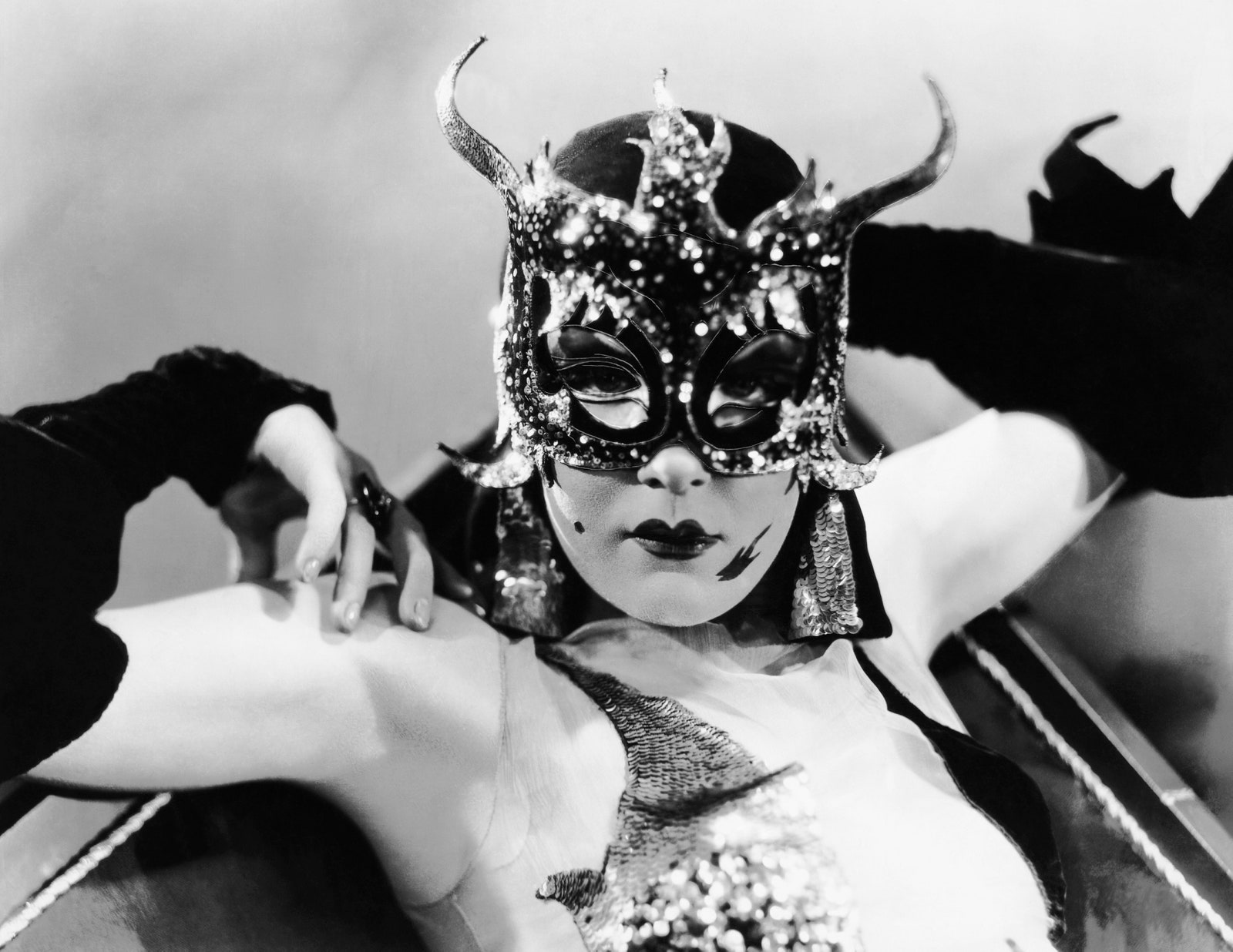
Angela (Kay Johnson) in her zeppelin party costume as Madam Satan

By that time Angela has unmasked and made herself known to Bob, who quickly resents her deception. He gives her his parachute harness and goes to find another harness for Trixie after she is unable to find one; Angela extorts a promise from Trixie to leave Bob alone in return for her own parachute harness. When Bob returns, he gives Angela his, and she parachutes safely into the open jump seat of a convertible car in which a couple are making out. Bob rides down a portion of the now broken apart zeppelin, diving at the last minute into the city reservoir just before impact. Jimmy ends up in a tree in the middle of the lion enclosure at the city zoo. Trixie parachutes through the roof of a Turkish bath full of toweled men who immediately scramble to cover themselves.

The next day, Angela, who is unharmed, and Bob, who has his arm in a sling, reconcile after a visit from a heavily bandaged Jimmy.

== Cast ==
The cast of Madam Satan is listed by the American Film Institute.

- Kay Johnson as Angela Brooks
- Reginald Denny as Bob Brooks
- Lillian Roth as Trixie
- Roland Young as Jimmy Wade
- Elsa Peterson as Martha
- Boyd Irwin as Captain
- Wallace MacDonald as First mate
- Wilfred Lucas as Roman senator
- Tyler Brooke as Romeo
- Lotus Thompson as Eve
- Vera Marshe as Call of the Wild
- Martha Sleeper as Fish girl
- Doris McMahon as Water
- Marie Valli as Confusion
- Julanne Johnston as Miss Conning Tower
- Albert Conti as Empire officer
- Earl Askam as Pirate
- Betty Francisco as Little Rolls Riding Hood
- Ynez Seabury as Babo
- Countess De Liguoro as Spain
- Katharine Irving as Spider Girl
- Aileen Ransom as Victory
- Theodore Kosloff as Electricity
- Jack King as Herman
- Edward Prinz as Biff
- Abe Lyman and his Orchestra

Katherine DeMille, DeMille's daughter, was an uncredited "Zeppelin Reveler".

Cecil B. DeMille voices an uncredited Radio Newscaster

== Music ==
Songs

- "Live and Love Today", sung by Elsa Petersen and Kay Johnson, words by Elsie Janis, music by Jack King
- "All I Know Is You're in My Arms", sung by Reginald Denny and Kay Johnson
- "This Is Love", sung by Reginald Denny and Kay Johnson (Missing from extant prints (see below); words by Clifford Grey, music by Herbert Stothart
- "Meet Madam", sung by Kay Johnson, by Grey and Stothhart
- "Low Down", sung by Lillian Roth
- "The Cat Walk", sung by Wallace MacDonald, by Grey and Stothhart
- "We're Going Somewhere"
- "Ballet Mecanique", uncredited

Soundtrack
Abe Lyman, who can be seen in Madam Satan, was hired to play the music. He recorded two numbers from the film for Brunswick Records. "Live And Love Today" and "This Is Love" were released on Brunswick's popular 10-inch series as record number 4804. Regal label in Australia also released a version of "Live And Love To-Day" by the Rhythmic Troubadours, record number G20999, in 1930.

Choreography
Theodore Kosloff, a DeMille regular who was better known as a dance director, was originally hired by DeMille to do the film's choreography, but MGM insisted on Leroy Prinz. However, some dance experts believe that Kosloff did choreograph the "Ballet Mechanicique", as it seems more representative of his work than that of Prinz.

== Production ==
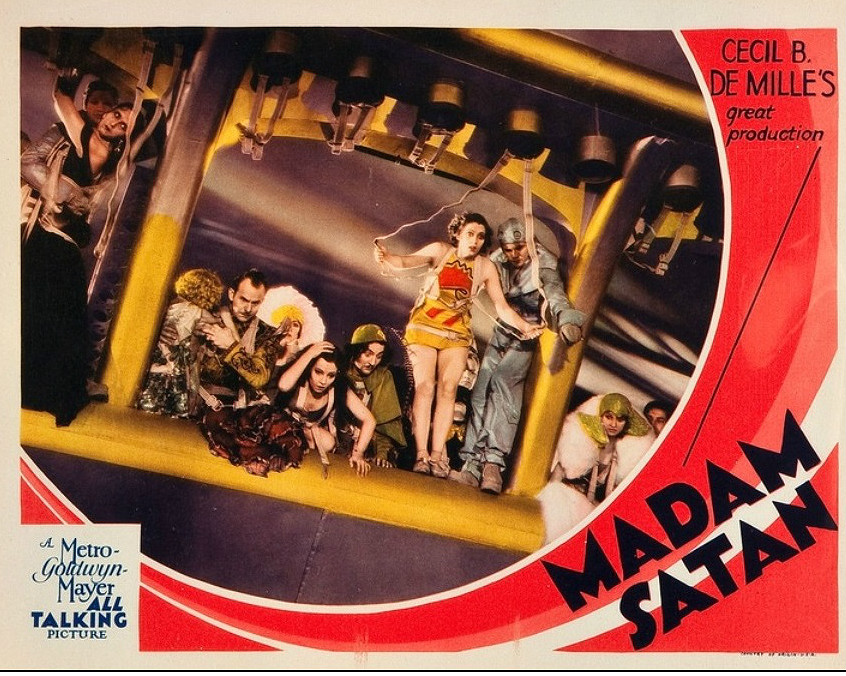
Theatrical release lobby card

The Zeppelin sequences were originally filmed in Multicolor. The color sequences were praised by reviewers for their richness and beauty. These color sequences survive only in a black and white copy today.

DeMille originally wanted writer Dorothy Parker to augment Jeanie MacPherson's original script. Learning that Parker was living in France, and that this would make collaboration too difficult, DeMille then sought vaudeville writer Elsie Janis. She agreed to work on the project, but left amicably on March 24, 1930, due to creative differences. Janis reportedly did not like the direction the script was going.

Hollywood censor Jason Joy worked with DeMille to minimize censorable elements in the potentially objectionable script. "They agreed to put less revealing costumes on the girls at the masquerade party. Body stockings, larger fig leaves and translucent fishnets took care of most of the nudity. The drinking scenes were toned down ...", Angela's "Madam Satan" costume also was made less revealing. An entire scene in which Angela confronts Trixie, and Trixie is shown wearing a sheer nightgown because she "has nothing to hide" was deleted. The collaboration ended up being agreeable to both men. The notoriously finicky Ohio censor board passed the film without cuts.

Thomas Meighan was sought for the lead role of Bob Brooks before Reginald Denny was cast on January 9, 1930. DeMille wanted Gloria Swanson for the role of Angela, but her lover and business partner Joseph P. Kennedy reportedly persuaded her not to accept the role. Swanson still was trying to salvage her disastrous venture in Queen Kelly (1929) and was advised to appear in films only made by her own production company. Although originally scheduled to be shot in 70 days, it took 59, with principal photography commencing on March 3 and ending on May 2, 1930. Madam Satan was the most expensive film made by Metro in 1930, and would remain its most expensive musical until The Merry Widow (1934).

== Reception ==
Madam Satan was released at a time when American theaters had become saturated with musicals, and as a result, it was a financial failure, eventually resulting in a net loss of $390,000.

In his review for The New York Times, film critic Mordaunt Hall described Madam Satan as "an inept story with touches of comedy that are more tedious than laughable." He further noted the film "is a strange conglomeration of unreal incidents that are sometimes set forth with no little technical skill. It begins with the flash of a bird bath and closes with the parachuting of passengers from a giant dirigible that is struck by lightning. This production, in which occasional songs are rendered, boasts of no fewer than 46 listed characters besides Abe Lyman and his band."

A similar review by Edwin Schallert in the Los Angeles Times noted: "The general impression of the DeMille picture is that it is too much in one key. The superabundance of sound palls, and leaves one weary. Besides, there is a staginess about the whole result that casts anything approaching convictions to one side." The Film Daily, a trade paper widely read by theater owners in 1930, also highlighted in its review the production's alleged excesses, including its extravagant production values and the frequent use of "risque lines" in its dialogue. The paper in its October 5 issue summarizes the film in all-capital letters as a "TYPICAL DE MILLE ORGY OF SPECTACULAR SETTINGS AND COSTUMES WITH 'HOT' LINES THAT KILL IT FOR FAMILY TRADE."

E. B. White in The New Yorker, 11 October 1930, wrote: "it contrives some of the most ludicrous moments ever flung on screen".

Another reviewer called it "probably the wackiest semi-musical-comedy/romance/drama/disaster film you're likely to encounter in this lifetime."

Today, a reassessment is taking place; though some only regard the film as an amusing oddity and an exercise in DeMille using "too much of everything just because he can."

== Preservation ==
The current print of Madam Satan has all of the color sequences in black-and-white and is missing at least one musical number. According to film reviews of 1930, Kay Johnson and Reginald Denny originally sang "This Is Love", but in the currently circulating print, this song is only heard playing in the background during a scene in which Johnson is speaking to her maid.

== Home media ==
The original Multicolor sequences of Madam Satan exist only in black-and-white. The film was released for home viewing on VHS and, as of November 9, 2010, was released on DVD via the Warner Archive Collection made-to-order process. The film is televised by Turner Classic Movies as part of the channel's standard programming rotation.

== See also ==
- List of early color feature films
- Pre-Code sex films

== Sources ==
- Barrios, Richard (1995) A Song in the Dark: The Birth of the Musical Film. New York: Oxford University Press. ISBN 0-19-516729-5.
- Birchard, Robert S. (2004) Cecil B. DeMille's Hollywood. Lexington, Kentucky: University of Kentucky Press. ISBN 978-0-8131-2324-0.
- Black, Gregory D. (1994) Hollywood Censored: Morality Codes, Catholics, and the Movies. New York: Cambridge University Press. ISBN 978-0-5215-6592-9.
- Eyman, Scott (2010) Empire of Dreams New York: Simon & Schuster. ISBN 978-0743289559.
- Higashi, Sumiko (1994) Cecil B. DeMille and American Culture: The Silent Era. Berkeley, California: University of California Press. ISBN 0-520-08557-4.
- Ringgold, Gene and Bodeen (1969) The Films of Cecil B. DeMille. Secaucus, New Jersey: Citadel Press, ISBN 978-0-8065-0216-8.
