= Phil Berg =

Phil Berg may refer to:

- Philip J. Berg (born 1944), American attorney
- Phil Berg (talent agent) (1902–1983), American talent agent
- Philip Berg (1927–2013), American rabbi

== See also ==
- Filip Berg (born 1986), Swedish actor
