= Way Out West (1930 film) =

1930 film

- Theatrical release poster
- Directed by: Fred Niblo
- Screenplay by: Joseph Farnham; Byron Morgan; Ralph Spence
- Story by: Byron Morgan
- Produced by: Harry Rapf
- Starring: William Haines; Leila Hyams; Polly Moran; Ralph Bushman
- Cinematography: Henry Sharp
- Edited by: Jerome Thoms; William S. Gray
- Music by: Joseph Meyer
- Production company: Metro-Goldwyn-Mayer
- Distributed by: Metro-Goldwyn-Mayer
- Release date: August 2, 1930
- Running time: 71 minutes
- Country: United States
- Language: English
- Budget: $413,000
- Box office: $497,000

Way Out West is a 1930 American pre-Code western parody film, directed by Fred Niblo. The film stars William Haines, Leila Hyams, Polly Moran, and Ralph Bushman. It tells the story of Windy, a con man who cheats a group of cowboys out of their money. When they discover his cheating and learn that he has been robbed, they force him to work on a ranch until he has paid his debt. The film is notable for its homoerotic overtones and gay in-jokes.

Way Out West (1930)

== Plot ==
The tale begins with the wise cracking Windy as a sideshow barker. Playing in a small western town, Windy takes the cowboys for a ride on a rigged roulette wheel. When they get wise to the fake they take him for a ride into the country and are about to hang him when the foreman of the ranch comes along and suggests that they have Windy work and pay them back what money he has taken from them.

This they agree to do and Windy is taken to Molly Rankin's ranch, where he is forced to do all sorts of menial tasks. He does them without much grumbling and intersperses his duties with lots of laugh-provoking antics. Molly falls for Windy and he for her. When she sends him to town to bank some money he faces the test of either running away or coming back to Molly. The latter is decided upon and when called "yellow" by Molly for not telling the other lads where to get off he fights it out with Steve, who is also a potential suitor for Molly. Windy ends up getting pummeled by Steve.

When Steve and the other cowpunchers leave for the roundup Windy decides to make his get away. As he is leaving Molly is bitten by a rattlesnake and Windy after operating with a jackknife and removing most of the poison, rushes her to an Indian medicine man. On the return home they become lost in a sand storm and Windy leaves Molly in the car while he looks for the trail. When he returns, Buck, Molly's brother, has taken her home and Windy is left in the desert.

The cowboys, thinking Windy has kidnapped Molly, set out after him. When they find him they all start shooting at him as he runs around a deserted Indian village. When Windy is finally cornered, he fights it out with Steve and this time he wins. When he returns to the ranch, he finds Molly in her bedroom and barricades the door, telling her if they try to take you away from me, I'll shoot every man in Arizona. Buck and the ranch hands then appear in another door to Molly's bedroom, and Windy draws his guns, but Molly explains that they only went after him to bring him back to her. The film ends with Windy asking Buck if there is a minister in Arizona, and Windy and Molly kissing.

== Cast ==
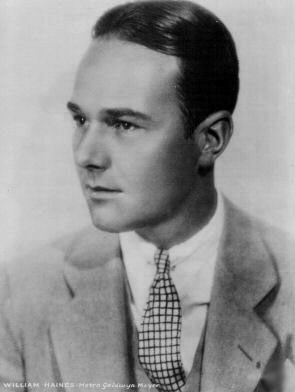
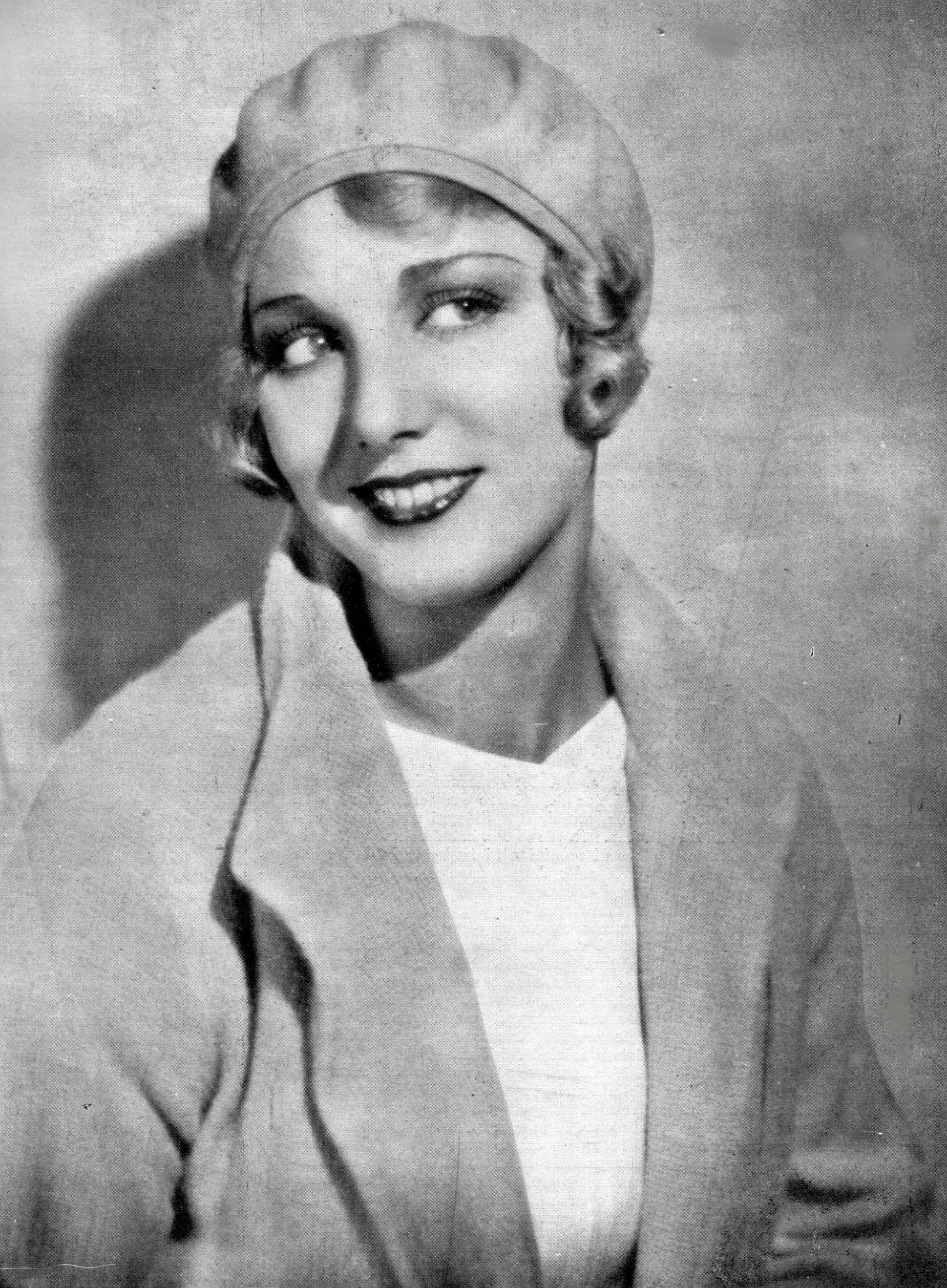
William Haines and his co-star Leila Hyams
- William Haines as Windy (short for Windermere)
- Leila Hyams as Molly Rankin
- Polly Moran as Pansy
- Cliff Edwards as Trilby
- Ralph Bushman as Steve
- Vera Marshe as La Belle Rosa
- Charles Middleton as Buck Rankin
- Jack Pennick as Pete
- Buddy Roosevelt as Tex
- Jay Wilsey as Hank
- Catherine Moylan as Carnival Show Girl

== Background and production ==
External image
- Haines, Bush and Hyams in a promotional ad for Way Out West (via Independent-Leader)

In February 1930, MGM announced that the film would be directed by Niblo, with Haines starring as a "swashbuckling cow-puncher" in a romantic Western comedy. The film was initially titled Easy Going, and was changed to Way Out West in May 1930. The film was made on a budget of $413,000, one of the more expensive films Haines made, and it profited $84,000, making it one of the less profitable of his films of the period.

Harry Rapf, who was uncredited, was a producer on the project. The theme song for the film was called "Singing a Song to the Stars", with lyrics by Howard Johnson, and music by Joseph Meyer. According to Haines, in the scene where the cowboys decide to hang him, it almost ended in disaster as the horse bolted and he really was hanging there by his neck for several seconds.

The movie was shot on location in New Mexico, and was the first feature length comedy made in the state. Film locations included a cattle ranch near Fort Pueblo, and Laguna Pueblo and Acoma Pueblo in northern New Mexico. In the scenes filmed at the pueblos, the actors and crew would have to climb steep ladders in order to reach the filming location.

Another location was near Gallup, where the actors and the entire crew had to wear gas-masks when they were shooting a scene during an actual sand storm, that is featured in the film. Members of the Hopi Tribe, who had never seen a motion picture, appeared as extras. The Gallup Independent reported that the film was the "first to have been filmed by a sound studio on wheels", a special train having been equipped with a laboratory car, camera car, and a sound recording car.

== Homoerotic themes ==
Video clip of the "pansy" scene

Haines biographer William J. Mann cites latent homoeroticism and inside gay humor throughout the film. In one particular example viewed in light of the Pansy Craze that was beginning to reach Hollywood, cited by Mann and film critic Kevin Thomas, Windy is mistaken for the cook Pansy. When called by her name by Molly, he replies "I'm the wildest pansy you ever picked!" (Note: Film historians Richard Barrios, Shane Brown, and Ron Gregg, who writes and teaches about queer cinema, also cite this scene as an example of inside gay humor.) British author Anthony Slide argues that while Haines may have been behaving in a highly effeminate manner on screen, citing the "pansy" scene, the reason might not have been the actor's desire to tell the world he was gay, but simply bad direction by Fred Niblo.

In another scene where he dresses up in his best outfit, he tells a group of cowboys that "not only do I have the clothes but I have the figure to wear them", while he swishes his hips in front of them. In conclusion, Mann wrote:

Way Out West pushed the limits of his screen characterization, exaggerating his effeminacy and campiness beyond anything he'd done before. He swishes, dishes, flicks his wrist. He tells the cowboys they’re "too rough" and calls an Indian chief "sweetheart." Seeing the film today, it's impossible to believe the campiness wasn't deliberate: as Haines had done on numerous pictures, he ad-libbed and improvised, and director Fred Niblo incorporated his queerness right into the film. The result was one of the gayest films to come out of Hollywood.

Film historian Richard Barrios, remarked that the film is "one of the gayest films ever made", and appears to be the only one in "which Haines gayness truly seems to be a factor ... for anyone seeking gay text or subtext in any of Haines's movies, this is the one to study." Fellow film historian Shane Brown is in agreement, adding there is very little effort to hide Haines's homosexuality from audiences — "in fact, the film seems to treat it as a running joke; while still the often-wisecracking character that he was known for, there is an added campness here", that is seen throughout the movie.

Part of what made Haines so popular was his very queerness.

— William Mann

Haines was eventually banned from filmmaking by William Hays, because of his sexual orientation. (Note: The Hays Office banned "pansy and nance characters or players of that type" from Hollywood films in June 1933.) The studio where he worked, MGM, had pressured him to give up his gay lifestyle, but Haines refused, so after more than 30 films for the studio, they let him go in September 1933. (Note: According to Mann, Louis B. Mayer is responsible for Haines being fired, for failing to "foster a heterosexual image.") He eventually opened an interior design business, whose clients included Gloria Swanson, Marion Davies, Joan Crawford, George Cukor, Jack Warner, Phil Berg, Lucille Ball, Jack Benny and Ronald and Nancy Reagan. (Note: Haines was the set designer for the 1931 MGM film Just a Gigolo, which he also appeared in.)

== Reception ==
Film critic Mordaunt Hall stated the film "is best described as one that suits Haines's particular style of acting; it is an impertinent, moderately comic affair tinctured with slapstick and romance; it is quite obviously something that has been specially written for the screen, for the characters are no more real than those in a Punch and Judy show."

Variety Magazine wrote "in spots are some fast action and wise-cracking dialog that gets the laughs; it's hoke of the kind that has always been salable; hard riding, rolling, Arizona country, an Indian village and details of ranch life make the locale real and an important part of the entertainment" Leonard Maltin commented it is "one of the star's better talkies, a Western spoof with snappy one-liners and a rootin-tootin gun battle finale."

Walter Greene of Motion Picture News commented "this story is filled with many ridiculous situations; too much leeway was taken in putting over some of the gags and the reason for all the chase scenes in the last reel or two will perhaps never be known; the director, had a tough story to begin with, but made fair progress with it; Haines does his usual stuff and has little opportunity for anything new."

Harry Evans of Life Magazine disliked the film stating, "there is no hope for Haines to retain his popularity so long as Metro-Goldwyn see fit to keep giving him roles that make him behave like a jackass; Way Out Wes is another of these; this is really a crime; Haines has talent; he can do pathos better than any other young actor on the screen and is a convincing exponent o! romantic characterizations."

== See also ==
- List of films shot in New Mexico
- List of LGBTQ-related films of the 1930s
- Native Americans in film

== Sources ==
- AFI (2025). "Way Out West (1930)". AFI Catalog of Feature Films. Archived from the original on January 24, 2025.
- AFI Catalog (June 1, 2021). "AFI Catalog Spotlight: William Haines". Archived from the original on June 18, 2024.
- Andree, Deny (August 30, 1930). "Indians Are Seen In Way Out West". Venice Vanguard. Vol. 8, no. 72. Associated Press.
- Barrios, Richard (2003). "Speaking Plainly". Screened Out: Playing Gay in Hollywood from Edison to Stonewall. New York: Routledge. ISBN 0-415-92328-X.
- Berg, Jeff (2015). "The 1930s and 1940s". New Mexico Filmmaking. The History Press. ISBN 978-1-4671-1799-9.
- Berman, Sid (July 19, 1930). "Best Sellers Week Ending July 12". Exhibitors Herald-World. Vol. 100, no. 3.
- Brown, Shane (September 1, 2023). "Sissies and Lost Pardners: Issues of Masculinity and Male Queerness in the Early Western". European Journal of American Culture. 42 (2). doi:10.1386/ejac_00102_1.
- Evans, Harry (September 5, 1930). "Way Out West". Life Magazine. Vol. 96, no. 2496.
- Fortune, Danny (May 20, 2008). "Way Out West (1930) Review: William Haines Gay Western". Alt Film Guide. Archived from the original on August 5, 2025. "Way Out West production credit: Harry Rapf is listed in the Eddie Mannix Ledger, found at the Academy of Motion Picture Arts and Sciences Margaret Herrick Library."
- Gaberscek, Carlo; Stier, Kenny (2014). In Search of Western Movie Sites. CP Entertainment Books. ISBN 978-1-312-62502-0.
- Gregg, Ronald (January 2003). "Gay Culture, Studio Publicity, and the Management of Star Discourse: The Homosexualization of William Haines in Pre-Code Hollywood". Quarterly Review of Film and Video. 20 (2). doi:10.1080/10509200390118489.
- Greene, Walter R. (August 9, 1930). "Way Out West". Motion Picture News. Vol. 42, no. 6. This article incorporates text from this source, which is in the public domain.
- Hall, John (March 1, 1930a). "Fred Niblo Is To Direct William Haines". Hollywood Filmograph. Vol. 10, no. 7.
- Hall, Mordaunt (August 18, 1930). "The Screen: Triumphant Impudence". The New York Times. Archived from the original on March 11, 2016.
- Jaeger, Vincent J., ed. (November 28, 1930). "Way Out West Filmed In New Mexico". The Gallup Independent. Vol. 41, no. 74.
- Kehr, Dave (January 26, 1998). "Camping Out In H'Wood". New York Daily News. ISSN 2692-1251.
- Maltin, Leonard (2015). Turner Classic Movies Presents Leonard Maltin's Classic Movie Guide: From the Silent Era Through 1965 (3rd ed.). Penguin Publishing Group. ISBN 978-0-698-19729-9.
- Mann, William J. (1998). "Excess Baggage". Wisecracker: The Life and Times of William Haines, Hollywood's First Openly Gay Star. New York: Viking Press. ISBN 0-670-87155-9.
- Mann, William J. (2002). "Wild Pansies: Hollywood's Sissies and the Production-Code Clampdown 1930-1941". Behind the Screen: How Gays and Lesbians Shaped Hollywood, 1910-1969. New York: Viking Press. ISBN 0-670-03017-1.
- Mann, William J. (2004). Gay Pride: A Celebration Of All Things Gay And Lesbian. Citadel Press. ISBN 978-0-8065-2563-1.
- Mitchill, Leonard (May 29, 1930). "Haines Film Called Way Out West Now". Exhibitors Daily Review and Motion Pictures Today. Vol. 27, no. 127.
- Phillips, Jane (May 20, 2007). "Name That Film". The Santa Fe New Mexican. ISSN 1938-4068.
- Porter, Kenneth R. (August 3, 1930). "Haines as Wisecracker Wins 'the Raspberry' in Way Out West at Fox". In The Motion Picture World. The San Francisco Examiner. Vol. 133, no. 34. Universal Service.
- Rossen, Jake (June 18, 2024). "William Haines, Hollywood's First Out Gay Superstar". Mental Floss.
- Slide, Anthony (2005). "The Silent Closet: Gays, Lesbians, and Silent Film". Silent Topics: Essays on Undocumented Areas of Silent Film. Lanham: Scarecrow Press. ISBN 0-8108-5016-8.
- Stein, Elliott (January 27, 1998). "Out and In". The Village Voice. ISSN 0042-6180.
- Thomas, Kevin (February 19, 1998). "Nurses in Lace; Stanwyck and Blondell show their star power in William Wellman's romp". Los Angeles Times. ISSN 0458-3035.
- Waly (August 20, 1930). "Way Out West". Film Reviews. Variety Magazine. Vol. 100, no. 6.
- Weinstein, Steve (February 2002). "Hollywood Outing". Outfront Television. Out Magazine. ISSN 1062-7928.
