= The Girl from Mandalay =

1936 film by Howard Bretherton

- Title screenshot
- Directed by: Howard Bretherton
- Screenplay by: Wellyn Totman; Endre Bohem
- Based on: Tiger Valley by Reginald Campbell
- Produced by: Nat Levine
- Starring: Conrad Nagel; Kay Linaker; Donald Cook; Esther Ralston; Harry Stubbs; Reginald Barlow
- Cinematography: Jack A. Marta; Ernest Miller
- Music by: Arthur Kay
- Production company: Republic Pictures
- Distributed by: Republic Pictures
- Release date: April 20, 1936
- Running time: 68 minutes
- Country: United States
- Language: English

The Girl from Mandalay is a 1936 American action film directed by Howard Bretherton and written by Wellyn Totman and Endre Bohem. It is based on the 1931 novel Tiger Valley by Reginald Campbell. The film stars Conrad Nagel, Kay Linaker, Donald Cook, Esther Ralston, Harry Stubbs and Reginald Barlow. The film was released on April 20, 1936, by Republic Pictures.

== Cast ==
- Conrad Nagel as John Foster
- Kay Linaker as Jeanie Barton Foster
- Donald Cook as Kenneth Grainger
- Esther Ralston as Mary Trevor
- Harry Stubbs as Herbert Trevor
- Reginald Barlow as Dr. Collins
- George Regas as Headman
- David Clyde as Malone
- Harry Allen as Ship Captain
