= Surrender (1931 film) =

1931 film

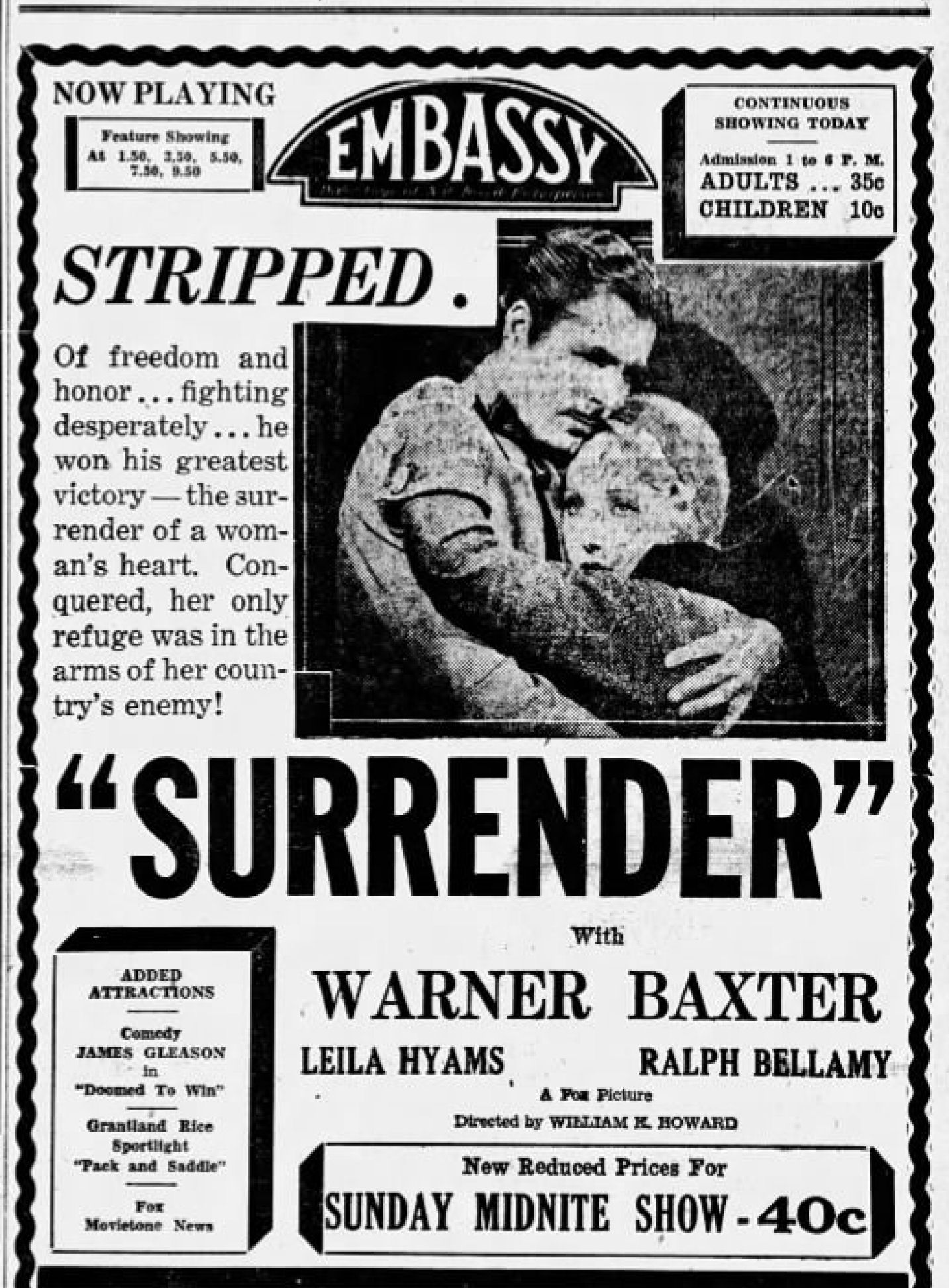
- Newspaper advertisement
- Directed by: William K. Howard; Robert Lee "Lefty" Hough (assistant director)
- Written by: S. N. Behrman (screenplay, dialogue); Sonya Levien (screenplay, dialogue)
- Based on: Axelle by Pierre Benoit
- Produced by: Fox Film Corporation
- Starring: Warner Baxter; Leila Hyams
- Cinematography: James Wong Howe
- Edited by: Paul Weatherwax
- Music by: Carl Elinor
- Distributed by: Fox Film Corporation
- Release date: December 6, 1931
- Running time: 69 minutes
- Country: United States
- Language: English

Surrender is a 1931 American pre-Code drama film directed by William K. Howard, written by S.N. Behrman, and starring Warner Baxter, Leila Hyams, Ralph Bellamy, C. Aubrey Smith, and Alexander Kirkland. It is based on Axelle, a novel by Pierre Benoit. The film is widely considered to have exerted an enormous influence upon Jean Renoir's subsequent Grand Illusion.

== Plot ==
During World War I, the wily and attractive French POW Sergeant Dumaine is sequestered in a prison camp near the castle of a prideful Prussian nobleman and military general, Count Reichendorf, who lives for the day that his four sons will march triumphantly into Paris. Having lost three sons to the French and English armies, and left with only one son, Dietrich, Reichendorf laments the days when his family made Prussia "the might of land." He is forced to recruit military men from the prison camp.

Axelle, the daughter of one of the sons, who became his ward when her parents died, lives in the Reichendorf castle and makes periodic goodwill visits to the prison compound, where she first encounters Dumaine. Captain Ebbing, the martinet and disfigured prison commandant, develops an interest in Axtelle. He courts her, but Axelle shows little interest in him, and when he reminds her how he dazzled her before he went into battle, she rejects his affections and tells him that she is engaged to Dietrich. Ebbing pleads with her, insisting that his love for her is more intense and enduring than that of any other man, but she is not swayed.

Ebbing soon puts Dumaine and the other prisoners to work at the unpleasant task of burial detail. When Dumaine, Fichet and other prisoners escape by overpowering the guards, they break into the Reichendorf castle and take refuge there, but are soon discovered by Axelle and taken back to the prison. One day, after noticing billows of smoke coming from the castle, Dumaine heroically rushes into the castle and puts out a kitchen fire. In gratitude for his valor, Ebbing commissions Dumaine, an electrical engineer by profession, to wire the castle. Dumaine's new assignment puts him in close contact with Axelle, and they soon become friends. After one month, Axelle begins to trust Dumaine and suggests that he remove his prison number from his uniform.

When news reaches Germany that Dietrich has led his regiment in victorious battle against the French, an end to the war is predicted. Axelle is overjoyed at the news, but Dumaine, whose loyalties still remain with France, is upset. Back at the prison, Dumaine's fellow inmates resent Dumaine's privileged status at the castle, and plan a breakout without him. Soon after Dietrich returns from the battlefront, he discovers his fiancée in the arms of Dumaine, and learns that Ebbing, too, is trying to woo Axelle, so he decides to return to the front. When the jealous Ebbing learns of Dumaine's affair with Axelle, he sends the Frenchman to be executed despite Axelle's pleas to spare him.

Ebbing later has a change of heart, however, and decides to call off the execution. News of the Armistice and the end of the war brings with it orders to suspend all disciplinary action against prisoners of war, and Ebbing, who sees no further use for himself as a military leader, commits suicide. With the battlelines suddenly erased, Dumaine and Axelle resume their romance with a kiss.

== Cast ==
- Warner Baxter as Sergeant Dumaine
- Leila Hyams as Axelle von Meirbach
- Ralph Bellamy as Captain Ebbing
- C. Aubrey Smith as Count Reichendorf
- Alexander Kirkland as Major Dietrich Reichendorf
- William Pawley as Courrut
- Howard Phillips as Claverie
- George Beranger as Fichet
- Bodil Rosing as Domenica
- Tom Ricketts as Gottlieb
- Frank Arthur Swales as Hugo
- Joe Sawyer as Sergeant Muller (credited as Joseph Sauers)
- Al Burke as Audemard
- Jack Conrad as Sylvestre
- Bert Hanlon as Vandaele (uncredited)
- J. Carrol Naish as French Prisoner of War (uncredited)
- Wilhelm von Brincken as Konrad Reichendorf (uncredited)
- Virginia Weidler as Little Girl (uncredited)
