= Doctor Snuggles =

1979 children's animated TV series

- Dennis the Badger, Doctor Snuggles, Knobby Mouse and Snuggles's umbrella
- Genre: Children's
- Created by: Jeffrey O'Kelly
- Based on: Original scripts and ideas by Jeffrey O'Kelly
- Written by: Richard Carpenter; Paul Halas; Douglas Adams; John Lloyd; Loek Kessels
- Voices of: Peter Ustinov; Olwen Griffiths; John Challis
- Narrated by: Peter Ustinov
- Composer: Ken Leray
- Countries of origin: The Netherlands; United Kingdom
- No. of series: 1
- No. of episodes: 13

Production
- Producer: Joop H. Visch
- Animators: Topcraft Limited Company (episodes 1-7); DePatie–Freleng Enterprises (episodes 8-13)
- Running time: 30 minutes
- Production company: Kidpix

Original release
- Network: ITV/Channel 4
- Release: 1 October 1979 – 1979

Doctor Snuggles is an animated children's television series created by Jeffrey O'Kelly, based on original artwork by Nick Price, about a friendly and optimistic inventor who has unusual adventures with his friends. The show featured fantastical scenarios typically based on the outlandish inventions of Doctor Snuggles, supported by a variety of supporting characters including anthropomorphic animals and objects.

== Production ==
The show was a co-production between British and Dutch producers. The animation was split by two studios: Topcraft Limited Company in Japan (episodes 1–7, plus intro and ending) and DePatie-Freleng (episodes 8–13) from the United States with some minor differences in animation. All Topcraft Limited Company episodes (with its unique sound effects) were directed by the prolific Tsuguyuki Kubo, who worked with Rankin/Bass (among others) on many of their features, movies (The Hobbit and The Last Unicorn), and syndicated series (ThunderCats). English, Dutch, German, Swedish and Spanish language versions exist, among others. In the English-language version the title character was narrated by veteran actor Peter Ustinov, with Olwen Griffiths and John Challis. The show debuted in 1980 and consisted of thirteen half-hour episodes.

The show was based on original artwork by British illustrator Nick Price, original scripts and ideas by Jeffrey O'Kelly, and television scripts for each episode by Richard Carpenter and John Halas. Two episodes (#7 and #12) were written by Douglas Adams and John Lloyd, both dealing with ecological issues. Episode 9 was written by Loek Kessels.

In the UK, the show featured as part of the Watch It! strand for children on the ITV network and later got repeated on Channel 4 as well as being broadcast on The Children's Channel on cable and satellite television. In Canada, the series aired on TVO in Ontario and on Knowledge Network in British Columbia. It also aired on the ABC in Australia and ran from 1 March 1982 to 20 September 1991, M-Net and Bop TV in South Africa, RTB in Brunei, RTÉ in the Irish Republic where it began airing in 1989 and was shown a number of times up until 1998, PTV in Pakistan, syndication (distribution via Chicago-based Field Communications securing US distribution rights), Nickelodeon, and Nick Jr. Channel in the US, TV2 and TV3 in Malaysia, MediaCorp Channel 5 in Singapore and in New Zealand on TV1 and TV2.

The Dutch dubbing was directed by Frans Voordrecht, by with voices by Jules Croiset, Trudy Libosan, Dick Scheffer and Rupert van Woerkom.

A German dubbed version was also produced, starring Walter Jokisch as Doctor Snuggles, produced by the Bavaria Atelier GmbH, that premiered in June 1981.

The Swedish version features John Harryson and the French version Roger Carel as Doctor Snuggles.

Also, a comic series was produced, published in Germany and Sweden.

== Plot ==
The show followed the adventures of Doctor Snuggles, a kind old gentleman who lives in a comfortable home with his elderly housekeeper, Miss Nettles. Doctor Snuggles spends most of his time inventing; across the series he creates robot Mathilda Junkbottom, a worm-mobile, a machine to restore the colours of the rainbow, a gadget to fight depression, a fire-proof lotion, and a time machine, amongst other inventions. Snuggles typically travels by means of a talking pogo-stick/umbrella and a wooden spacecraft called the Dreamy Boom Boom. Doctor Snuggles must also contend with the malevolent magician Professor Emerald, his arch enemy.

== Music ==
Songs in the Finnish dub were sung by the actors of YLE Import re-using the De Angelis's music but with new Finnish lyrics. In the Finnish dub some scenes are cut, which includes musical numbers in some episodes.

== Episodes ==
No.	Title	Directed by	Written by	Original release date
1	"The Fabulous Mechanical Mathilda Junkbottom"	Tsuguyuki Kubo	Richard Carpenter	1 October 1979
Doctor Snuggles builds the humanoid robot Mathilda Junkbottom as a help to Miss Nettles. Miss Nettles is not happy of her mechanical assistant but given a new chance after almost ruining Snuggles house by flooding it, Nettles and Mathilda form a friendship.
2	"The Astounding Treacle Tree"	Tsuguyuki Kubo	Richard Carpenter	8 October 1979
The Treacle Tree talks Doctor Snuggles into building it wings. Once the wings are built and mounted, the tree takes off and doesn't return. Snuggles and his friends go after the tree in a space ship and find it on a planet ruled by plants. Due to its ability to fly the Treacle Tree is now their emperor and wants nothing to do with Snuggles and the others.
3	"The Spectacular Rescue of Miss Nettles"	Tsuguyuki Kubo	Richard Carpenter	15 October 1979
The evil Professor Emerald arrives at the Snuggle's residence to 'sell' Ms. Nettles a flying carpet, but in reality wants to keep her as his own maid. The doctor tries to rescue her from the megalomaniac wizard, but the magician simply brings her back to her house because she was being rather bossy.
4	"The Unbelievable Wormmobile Adventure"	Tsuguyuki Kubo	Richard Carpenter	22 October 1979
Snuggles's uncle Bill's pet parrot flies to Snuggles to tell him that animals at Amazon River are turning into butterflies. Snuggles journeys there with his friends to meet Bill and to discover what is causing the anomality and how to remedy it.
5	"The Sensational Balloon Race"	Tsuguyuki Kubo	Richard Carpenter	29 October 1979
Granny Toots is in dire need of a new hospital for her cats, but is not able to get one since she doesn't have enough money to do so, so the Doctor has a plan: he enters a balloon race where he can win 1000 pounds. He meets up with Willy Fox and Charlie Rat who try to stop them and garner the winnings for themselves, but fail when Snuggles wins the prize.
6	"The Magical Multi-Coloured Diamond"	Tsuguyuki Kubo	Richard Carpenter	1979
The rainbow is in dire need of repair, and Snuggles tries to figure out how he can make the rainbow better, so he invents a diamond-making machine. Things go awry when Willie Fox tries to steal the invention, causing the machine to go haywire, and ultimately create a massive diamond in Rickety Rick. When Doctor Snuggles investigates, he is persuaded to enter the diamond, where he meets up with Woogie. There, he is told to make a rainbow-repairing machine with the large diamond.
7	"The Remarkable Fidgety River"	Tsuguyuki Kubo	Douglas Adams and John Lloyd	1979
During a hot summertime Snuggles is told of the Fidgety River being "dried up"; in truth it's hiding in a cave, "rolled up like a carpet", because someone has taken cubes of water from the ocean, leading it to fear it would disappear as well. After consulting Uncle Bill and the Cosmic Cat, he discovers that the water is being taken to Outer Space, so he begins to pursue the stolen water. Aliens from a planet made completely from water had taken the seawater for their planet, thinking it was unusable to Earth due to its polluted state. Snuggles promises that the water will be taken care of, and the aliens let Snuggles restore the water back to Earth.
8	"The Fearful Miscast Spell of Winnie the Witch"	Tsuguyuki Kubo	Paul Halas	1979
Snuggles works on arranging a midsummer party to further fund Granny Toots hospital's expansion. Climate grows hot due mysterious fiery creatures that begin to inhabit the surrounding areas. Snuggles discovers that they originate from Winnie the Witches' house at the Salt and Pepper mountains. With Dennis and Nobby, he begins a journey to seek a solution to the problem at hand, helping others on the way to the mountains. After dealing with the issue of the fiery creatures, luring them to a volcano, he returns home and finds that the midsummer party has been already arranged and festivities begin.
9	"The Extraordinary Odd Dilemma of Dennis the Badger"	Tsuguyuki Kubo	Loek Kessels	1979
Dennis the Badger contracts a fierce flu from one of Granny Toots's ill cats and while attempting to remedy the flu, the symptoms now turn Dennis into a raging person. Snuggles goes on a journey trying to discover a way to restore Dennis back to his former self.
10	"The Wondrous Powers of the Magic Casket"	Tsuguyuki Kubo	Paul Halas	1979
Uncle Bill arrives at the Snuggles house, showing Snuggles a strange map of sorts. The map is examined, and tells the story of a strange casket that, when opened, causes strange and dangerous things to happen. Professor Emerald gets hold of the casket and causes mayhem wherever he goes, and Doctor Snuggles tries to catch up with the wizard. He meets the Space Wanderer, the one who has been looking for the casket for many years. They meet up with Professor Emerald at Emerald Isle, and attempt to bring back the casket before it's too late.
11	"The Turn of Events with the Unwelcome Invaders"	Tsuguyuki Kubo	Paul Halas	1979
When Ms. Nettles suddenly becomes ill, Doctor Snuggles investigates and finds out that a strange group of creatures from another world have sent cans of odd substance to Earth. He finds out that there are machines that are destroying planets, devouring their vegetation and rendering them barren. With the help of Woogie and enslaved aliens working under the oppression of the machines, they manage to subdue the machines and use them to reverse the damage they had earlier caused.
12	"The Great Disappearing Mystery"	Tsuguyuki Kubo	Douglas Adams and John Lloyd	1979
Winnie the Witch, Miss Nettles, her friend, and Granny Toots are kidnapped by a gigantic bird. Snuggles and his friends pursue the kidnapper to a planet where quite opposite to fauna of Earth, birds are gigantic and intelligent while humans are animal-like and act like birds back at Earth. After being captured by the human-collecting kidnapper, he is convinced by Snuggles to stop the cruel hobby, freeing Winnie, Nettles, her friend and Granny Toots.
13	"The Amazing Reflective Myth"	Tsuguyuki Kubo	Paul Halas	1979
Nobby the mouse travels back in time to become King of the Huacopocans - but Doctor Snuggles and his friends have to save him! It's tough being the king.

== Movies ==
- Doctor Snuggles and His Friends (1984)
- The Magic of Doctor Snuggles (1985)

Doctor Snuggles and His Friends: - The Spectacular Rescue of Miss Nettles - The Remarkable Fidgety River - The Unbelievable Wormmobile Adventure - The Fearful Miscast Spell of Winnie the Witch - The Wondrous Powers of the Magic Casket

The Magic of Doctor Snuggles: - The Extraordinary Odd Dilemma of Dennis the Badger - The Great Disappearing Mystery - The Fabulous Mechanical Mathilda Junkbottom - The Sensational Balloon Race - The Magical Multi-Coloured Diamond

== Home releases ==
=== VHS ===
SWE - (Independent Video, re-released by Vision Park Video and Pan Vision) The edge of this 5 Vol forms a picture when put together.

Vol 1: - Hur Matilda Järndotter Kom Till (Ep1) - Det Flygande Sirapsträdet (Ep2)

Vol 2: - När Beata blev bortförd (Ep3) - Äventyret med den otroliga maskmobilen (Ep4)

Vol 3: - Ballongtävlingen (Ep5) - Jättediamanten (Ep6)

Vol 4: - Den ängsliga floden (Ep7) - När häxan Valborg lekte med elden (Ep8)

Vol 5: - När Grävlis inte var sig själv (Ep9) - Det magiska skrinet (Ep10)

Vol 6: - De farliga burkarna (Ep11) - Mysteriet med de försvunna damerna (Ep12) - Den fantastiska legenden (Ep13)

=== DVD ===
On 4 July 2005, Firefly Entertainment released Doctor Snuggles on DVD in the UK. The four-disc box set Doctor Snuggles: The Complete Collection features all thirteen episodes of the series.
