= When Strangers Marry (1933 film) =

1933 film directed by Clarence G. Badger

- Directed by: Clarence G. Badger
- Written by: Maximilian Foster; James Kevin McGuinness
- Starring: Jack Holt; Lilian Bond; Gustav von Seyffertitz
- Cinematography: Benjamin H. Kline
- Production company: Columbia Pictures
- Distributed by: Columbia Pictures
- Release date: May 25, 1933
- Running time: 65 minutes
- Country: United States
- Language: English

When Strangers Marry is a 1933 American pre-Code drama film directed by Clarence G. Badger and starring Jack Holt, Lilian Bond and Gustav von Seyffertitz.

== Cast ==
- Jack Holt as Steve Rand
- Lilian Bond as Marian Drake
- Arthur Vinton as Hinkle
- Barbara Barondess as Antonia
- Ward Bond as Billy McGuire
- Gustav von Seyffertitz as Van Wyck
- Paul Porcasi as Phillipe
- Rudolph Anders as Von Arnheim
- Charles Stevens as Chattermahl
- Harry Stubbs as Major Oliver
