= Tusk (1980 film) =

- Film Poster by Jean Giraud
- Directed by: Alejandro Jodorowsky
- Written by: Alejandro Jodorowsky; Nicholas Niciphor; Jeffrey O'Kelly; Reginald Campbell (novel)
- Produced by: Eric Rochat
- Starring: Cyrielle Clair; Anton Diffring; Serge Merlin; Christopher Mitchum
- Cinematography: Jean-Jacques Flori
- Music by: Jean-Claude Petit; Guy Skornik; Martin St. Pierre
- Distributed by: Gaumont Distribution
- Release date: 26 November 1980
- Running time: 119 minutes
- Country: France
- Language: French

Tusk (French title: Poo Lorn L'Éléphant) is a 1980 French drama film directed by Alejandro Jodorowsky and written by Nicholas Niciphor. The screenplay concerns a young English girl and an Indian elephant who share a common destiny. It is based on the 1935 novel Poo Lorn of the Elephants by Reginald Campbell.

In a 2016 interview published by Sight & Sound, Jodorowsky shared his thoughts on Tusk:

"For me, Tusk is a film as valuable as El Topo, only it is for children. What we have seen so far is an incomplete cut. But the producer, a crook like all filmmakers, declared bankruptcy, got the money in his pocket and fled, leaving the installation unfinished. I am still to this day fighting for the rights and the final cut, remastering and resubmission."

== Plot ==
The daughter of a British colonist, Elise Morrison lives with her father and Tusk, an elephant she rescued from the slavery to which he, like all his brethren, was destined. She feels very close to the Indian soul and culture, and even goes so far as to provoke the noble audience who have come to celebrate her return from England (where she had gone to study) by donning Hindu clothing and makeup.

Lord Spencer takes offense and insults her; the young American Richard Cairns hits him. Now in love with an elephant hunter, she has broken away from her father's guardianship. After leaving to hunt for a few months, Richard returns. Seeing in him a rival to Elise, Morrison suggests they organize a Kedah (elephant hunt) to drive her away. But Elise insists on going with them, less to be with Richard than to save Tusk, the prize in the great hunt, an attitude that arouses the American's jealousy. Tusk is captured with the other elephants, but thanks to the exhortations of Elise and Morrison, who has finally understood the secrets of nature, he frees himself and escapes. Then captured by Shakley and Greyson, two sinister characters, he is freed by his mahout and, vengeful, attacks every sign of civilization he encounters. Shakley takes Elise hostage. Richard rushes to her rescue.

Ultimately, the two youths are only saved by the arrival of Tusk, who punishes all the "bad guys." While they can finally freely confess their love for each other, Morrison discovers the spirit of India and is initiated into its spiritual dimension. Declared a sacred elephant by the people, Tusk regains his freedom. Born a slave, he ends up a deity under the name Ganesh.

== Cast ==
- Cyrielle Clair as Elise
- Anton Diffring as John Morrison
- Serge Merlin as Greyson
- Christopher Mitchum as Richard Cairn
- Michel Peyrelon as Shakley

== Production ==
The film was originally financed by Edmond Saran's Best International Films at a budget of $5.18 million. It was to be the company's first feature film to be released worldwide. Producer Eric Rochat invested 30% of the budget. French distribution rights were sold to Gaumont. The film was due to be shot south of Madras in India for 14 weeks from March 15, 1979.
