= The Girl Said No (1930 film) =

1930 film by Sam Wood

- Official poster, 1930
- Directed by: Sam Wood
- Written by: A. P. Younger (story); Sarah Y. Mason; Charles MacArthur (dialogue)
- Produced by: Sam Wood
- Starring: William Haines; Leila Hyams
- Cinematography: Ira H. Morgan
- Edited by: Frank Sullivan
- Production company: Metro-Goldwyn-Mayer
- Release date: March 15, 1930
- Running time: 90-93 minutes
- Country: United States
- Language: English

The full film

The Girl Said No is a 1930 pre-Code American romantic comedy film starring William Haines and Leila Hyams. A young college graduate goes to extreme lengths to win the girl he loves.

== Plot ==
Tom Ward, a cocky young football hero, returns home after graduation determined to conquer the world. He begins a flirtation with Mary Howe, secretary to his rival, McAndrews, and in a restaurant he bribes a waiter to spill soup on her employer. Although offered a local banking job, Tom stakes his fortunes on a scheme to sell bonds to wealthy old Hattie Brown, a befuddled spinster, and achieves the difficult task while posing as a doctor by getting her drunk. Finally, desperate over Mary's engagement to McAndrews, Tom kidnaps her from the altar. In a chase finale she is convinced that he loves her.

== Cast ==
- William Haines as Tom Ward
- Leila Hyams as Mary Howe
- Polly Moran as Polly
- Marie Dressler as Hettie Brown
- Ralph Bushman as J. Marvin McAndrews
- Clara Blandick as Mrs Ward
- William Janney as Jimmie Ward
- William V. Mong as Samuel A. Ward
- Frank Coghlan as Eddie Ward
- Phyllis Crane as Alma Ward

== Production ==
After the box office success of Anna Christie (1930) and the rave reviews that not only Greta Garbo received for her performance but also her co-star Marie Dressler, M-G-M management decided to cast the latter actress in The Girl Said No. Although Dressler was happy to have a new assignment from the studio, she had to hide her disappointment over the script and her role.

According to biographer Betty Lee in Marie Dressler: The Unlikeliest Star, "It seemed fairly obvious..that although M-G-M was impressed with Dressler's potential...the top office did not know how to handle their unique new contract player. [Studio head] Louis B. Mayer, who had already informed his minions that he wanted Dressler to be marketed as a mother figure who was also a battered version of life's wars, asked her to lunch in his private bungalow on the Culver City lot. Not only did Dressler appear to be a substantial mother figure in real life, M-G-M's boss was also aware that the actress exuded an easy air of upper-class panache. She was, he decided, a far classier individual than the Hollywood glamour girls he often professed to disdain."

Dressler would go on to star in a total of seven films in 1930 and win an Academy Award for her performance in Min and Bill (1930), opposite Wallace Beery.
