= The Brute (1927 film) =

1927 film

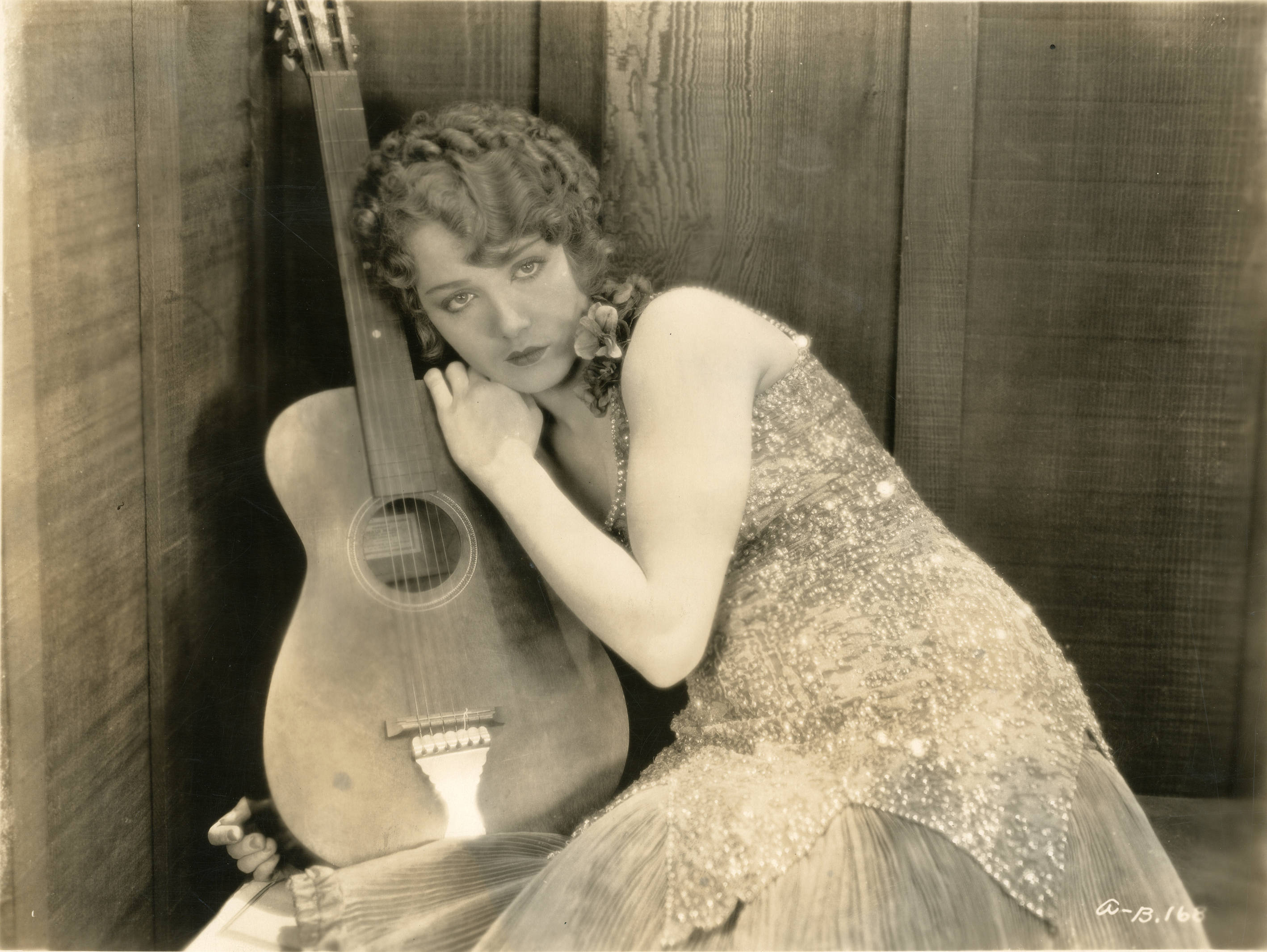
- Directed by: Irving Cummings
- Written by: Harvey Gates
- Based on: novel The Brute by W. Douglas Newton c.1924
- Produced by: Warner Brothers
- Starring: Monte Blue; Leila Hyams
- Cinematography: Conrad Wells
- Distributed by: Warner Bros.
- Release date: April 30, 1927
- Running time: 70 minutes
- Country: United States
- Languages: Silent; English intertitles

The Brute is a 1927 American silent Western film directed by Irving Cummings and starring Monte Blue. It was produced and distributed by Warner Bros. It is considered to be a lost film.

== Cast ==
- Monte Blue as Easy Going Martin Sondes
- Leila Hyams as Jennifer Duan
- Clyde Cook as Oklahoma Red
- Carroll Nye as The El
- Paul Nicholson as Square Deal Felton

== See also ==
- List of early Warner Bros. sound and talking features
