= Leila Hyams =

American actress (1905–1977)

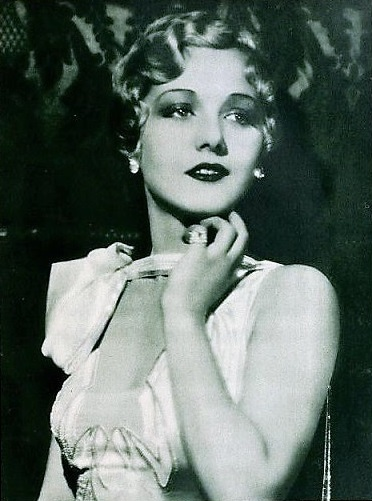
- Hyams in 1929
- Born: May 1, 1905; New York City, U.S.
- Died: December 4, 1977 (aged 72); Bel Air, Los Angeles, U.S.
- Occupation: Actress
- Years active: 1924–1939 (features film), film short (1946)
- Spouse: Phil Berg (1927–1977, her death)
- Mother: Leila McIntyre

Leila Hyams (May 1, 1905 – December 4, 1977) was an American actress who came from a show business family. Her relatively short film career began in 1924 during the era of silent films and ended in 1936 (excepting a 1946 film short appearance). The blonde blue-eyed ingenue and leading lady appeared in more than 50 film roles and remained a press favourite, with numerous magazine covers.

== Early life ==
Hyams was born in Manhattan, New York, to vaudeville comedy performers John Hyams and Leila McIntyre, who performed as the duo "Hyams and McIntyre" Her mother was a noted Broadway performer, and both her parents appeared in films. They can be seen together in several Hollywood pictures, primarily in minor supporting roles or uncredited appearances, including The Housekeeper's Daughter (1939).

Hyams appeared on stage with her parents while still a child, working in their vaudeville act for five years. Unable to establish a successful theatre career, she turned to modelling, modelling clothing, cosmetics and dental care.

== Film career ==
By 1928, Hyams was playing starring roles, achieving success in MGM's first talkie release, Alias Jimmy Valentine (1928) opposite William Haines, Lionel Barrymore, and Karl Dane. The following year, she appeared in the popular murder mystery The Thirteenth Chair, a role that offered her the chance to display her dramatic abilities as a murder suspect. At Fox that same year, she appeared in director Allan Dwan's now-lost romantic adventure The Far Call opposite Charles Morton. She had a role as Robert Montgomery's sister in the prison drama The Big House (1930) with Chester Morris and Wallace Beery. She then appeared in Surrender (1931) in which Warner Baxter and Ralph Bellamy desperately competed for her attention.

Hyams acted in two early 1930s horror movies, as the wise-cracking but kind-hearted circus performer Venus in Freaks (1932) and as the heroine in the Charles Laughton/Bela Lugosi film Island of Lost Souls (1932). She also appeared in the then-controversial Jean Harlow film Red-Headed Woman (1932) and the musical comedy The Big Broadcast (1932) with Bing Crosby, George Burns, and Gracie Allen.

== Personal life ==
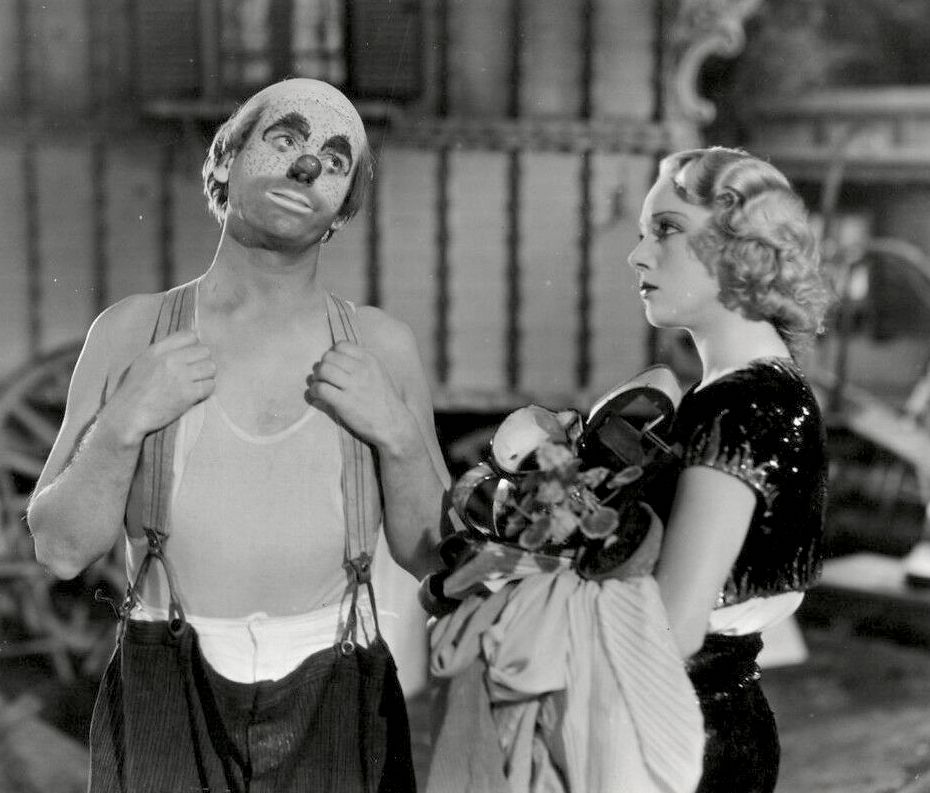
Leila Hyams as Venus with Wallace Ford as Phroso the Clown in Freaks (1932)

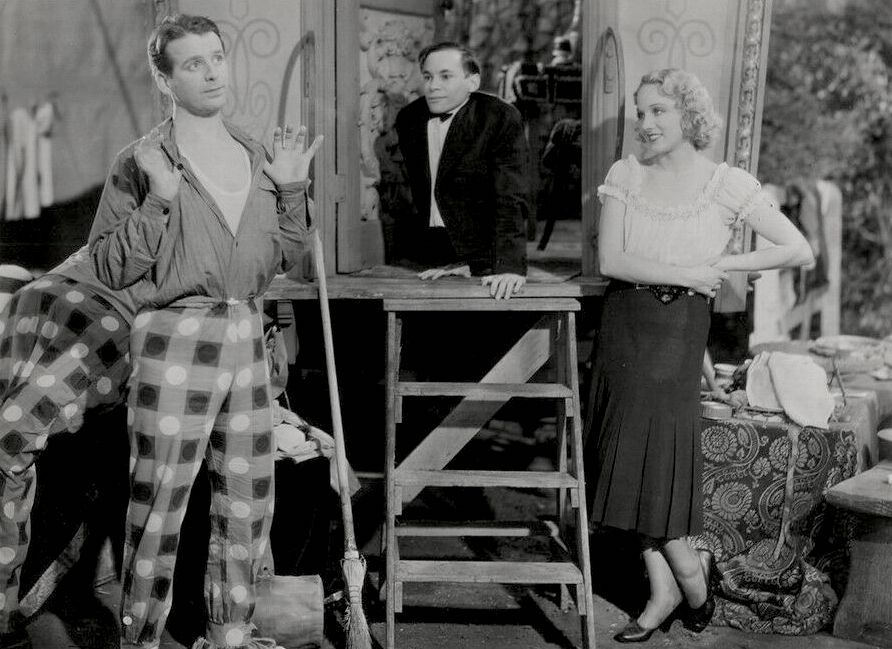
Wallace Ford, Johnny Eck and Hyams in Freaks (1932)

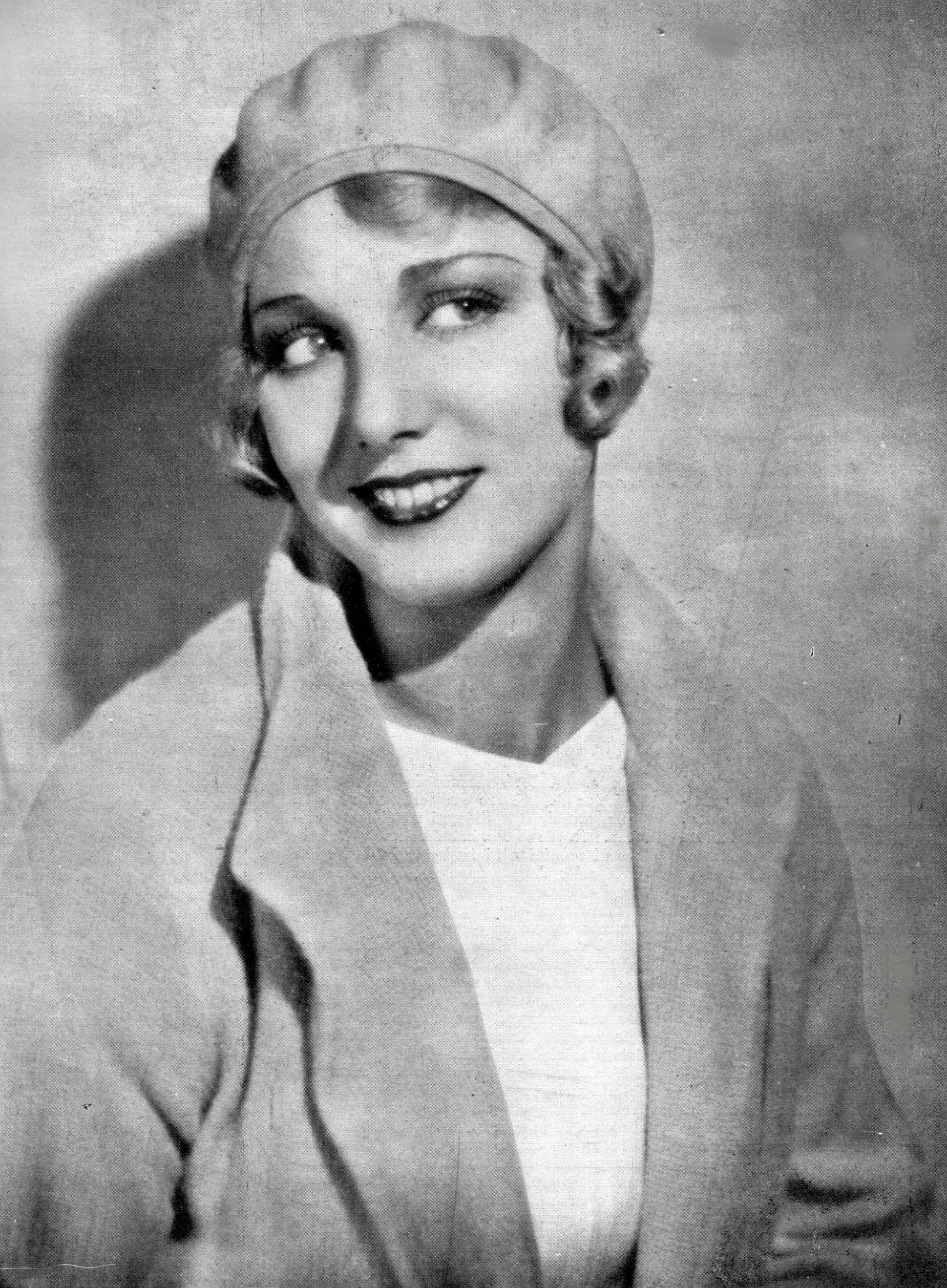
Hyams in 1932

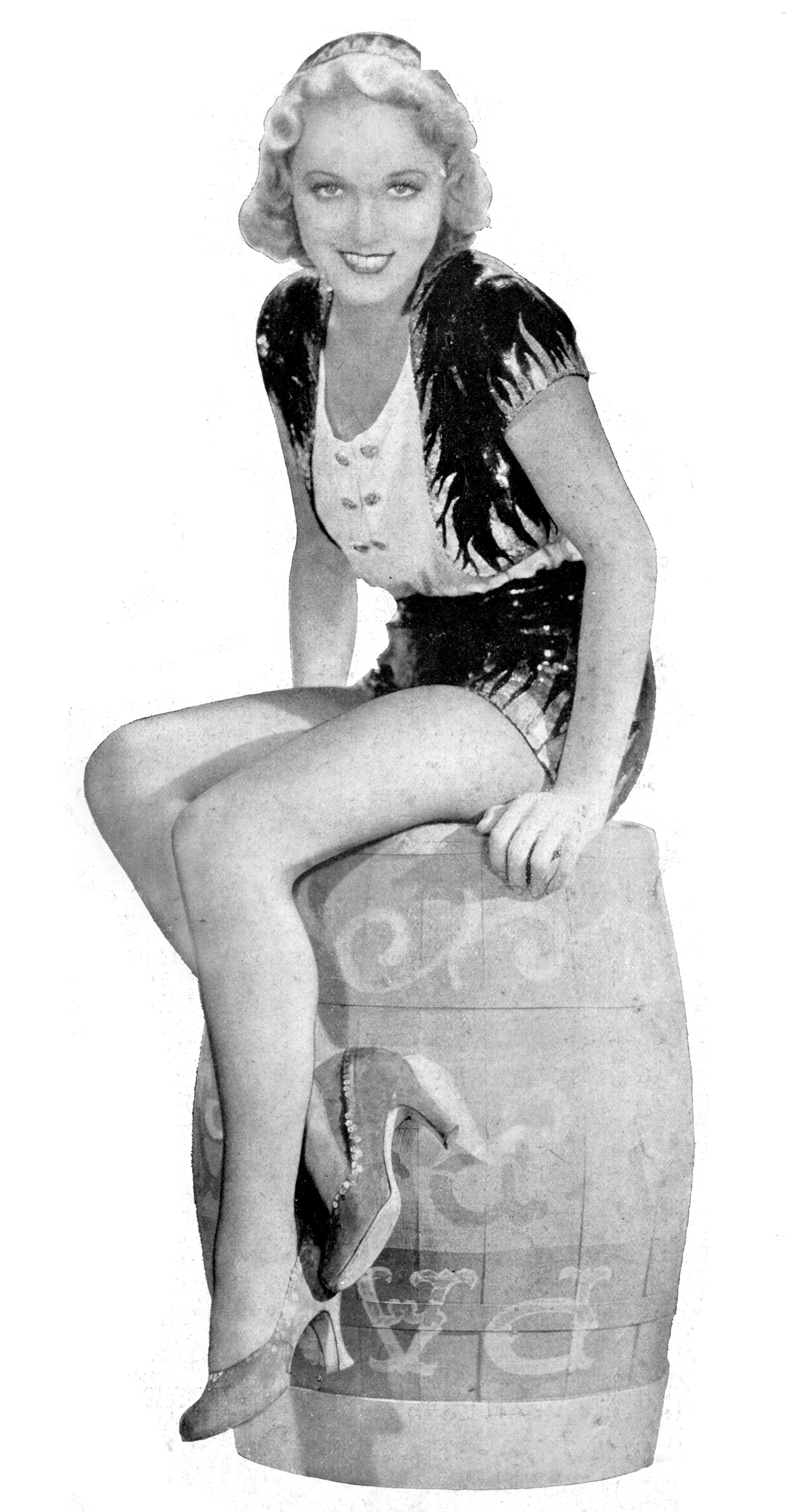
Hyams in 1932

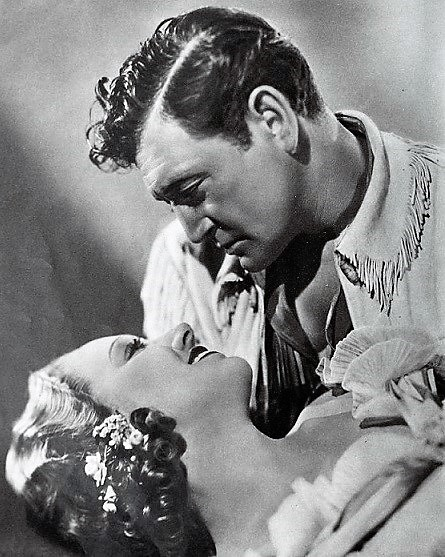
Hyams with co-star Richard Dix in Yellow Dust (1936), Hyams' last film.

Hyams married her Hollywood talent agent, Phil Berg, in 1927. In 1936, after a 12-year acting career and performing in 50 films, she retired from the motion-picture industry; nevertheless, she remained active in the Hollywood community for the rest of her life. In 1977, after a brief illness, Hyams died at age 72 at her home in Bel-Air in Los Angeles.

== Complete filmography ==
Year	Title	Role	Notes
1924	Sandra	Mait Stanley	Lost film
1926	Dancing Mothers	Birdie Courtney	
1926	The Kick-Off	Marilyn Spencer	
1926	Summer Bachelors	Willowdean French	
1927	The Brute	Jennifer Duan	Lost film
1927	White Pants Willie	Helen Charters	Lost film
1927	The Bush Leaguer	Alice Hobbs	Lost film
1927	One-Round Hogan	Helen Davis	Lost film
1927	The Wizard	Anne Webster	Lost film
1928	The Branded Sombrero	Connie Marsh	Lost film
1928	A Girl in Every Port	Widow in San Pedro, Belize	
1928	The Crimson City	Nadine Howells	
1928	Honor Bound	Selma Ritchie	Lost film
1928	Land of the Silver Fox	Marie du Fronque	
1928	Alias Jimmy Valentine	Rose	Lost film
1929	Spite Marriage	Ethyl Norcrosse	
1929	The Far Call	Hilda Larsen	Lost film
1929	The Idle Rich	Joan Thayer aka Joan Van Luyn	
1929	Wonder of Women	Karen	Lost film
1929	Masquerade	Sylvia Graeme	
1929	Hurricane	Mary Stevens	
1929	The Thirteenth Chair	Helen O'Neill	
1930	The Bishop Murder Case	Belle Dillard	
1930	The Girl Said No	Mary Howe	
1930	The Flirting Widow	Evelyn	
1930	The Big House	Anne Marlowe	
1930	Sweethearts and Wives	Angela Worthington	
1930	The Sins of the Children	Alma Wagenkampf	
1930	Way Out West	Molly Rankin	
1930	Way for a Sailor	Joan	
1930	Part Time Wife	Mrs. Murdock	
1931	Gentleman's Fate	Marjorie Channing	
1931	Men Call It Love	Connie	
1931	Stepping Out	Eve Martin	
1931	The Phantom of Paris	Cecile Bourrelier	
1931	New Adventures of Get Rich Quick Wallingford	Dorothy	
1931	Surrender	Axelle von Meirbach	
1931	The Christmas Party	Herself	Short subject Uncredited
1932	Freaks	Venus	
1932	Red-Headed Woman	Irene Legendre	
1932	The Big Broadcast	Anita Rogers	
1932	Island of Lost Souls	Ruth Thomas	
1933	The Constant Woman	Lou	
1933	Horse Play	Angelica Wayne	
1933	Sing Sinner Sing	Lela Larson	
1933	Saturday's Millions	Joan Chandler	
1934	The Poor Rich	Grace Hunter	
1934	Affairs of a Gentleman	Gladys Durland	
1934	No Ransom	Barbara Winfield	
1935	Ruggles of Red Gap	Nell Kenner	
1935	People Will Talk	Peggy Trask	
1935	1,000 Dollars a Minute	Dorothy Summers	
1936	Yellow Dust	Nellie Bryan	
1943	First Aid	Red Cross Worker	Short subject
