= Reginald Campbell =

British writer

Reginald Campbell (1894–1950) was a British writer and Naval officer in WWI, then an assistant forest manager in Siam in the 1920s. His novel Poo Lorn of the Elephants was filmed by Alejandro Jodorowsky in 1980 under the name Tusk. Another novel, Tiger Valley, was filmed in 1936 by Howard Bretherton as The Girl from Mandalay. He described his personal experiences in Thailand in the book Teak-Wallah: The Adventures of a Young Englishman in Thailand in the 1920s.

In his book "Teak Wallah," he describes a character called Smith, his assistant in Muang Ngow - Flight Lieutenant 'Dick' Frederick Murison, who almost died from fever in the teak jungle and later served as a bomber pilot in Afghanistan in the late 20s. Smith may be the real-life Mr. W. Elder, Forest Manager of Anglo-Siam Forest Company, a heroic figure who lived amongst the elephants of Muang Ngow near Lakon (in the book Nakon), who retired in Riverhead, Kent, dying in about 1935. He describes life as an assistant forest manager with its dangers from disease and wild animals while logging teak with elephants.

Campbell's book "Jungle Nights" concerns an elephant breeder and trader in Siam in the 1920s. The climactic scene includes a Roman-style elephant charge in phalanx formation against an evil Mongol elephant trader. The character of Tubby Kenson is a bumbling teak wallah may be based partly on Fred Murison, to whom Campbell inscribed a copy of the book in December, 1934. The hero, Jim Dales, is an autobiographical character. This book is out of print and rare.

Other works include "Cruiser In Action" about his Naval experiences, and "Fear in the Forest," a jungle adventure.

== Works ==
Note: non-exhaustive list. For novels, the date shown is the oldest found.

- 1920 : The Temple of Ghosts in The Illustrated London News of November 24, reissued in Munsey's of November 1928
- 1925 : Brown Wife-gold White?
- 1926 : Uneasy Virtue
- 1927 : Snake Bite in Everybody's Magazine of February
- 1927 : Just to Add Interest in Everybody's Magazine of April
- 1927 : The White Elephant in The Popular Stories of November 12
- 1927 : The Siamese Cat in Everybody's Magazine of November
- 1928 : Prestige in Everybody's Magazine of January
- 1928 : The Fighting of Giants in Everybody's Magazine of February
- 1928 : Even Justice in Everybody's Magazine of March
- 1928 : The Shikari in Everybody's Magazine of April
- 1928 : The Price of the Tusks in Everybody's Magazine of May
- 1928 : Cuthbert in Everybody's Magazine of June
- 1928 : The Mankiller in Everybody's Magazine of July 1928
- 1928 : The Call of the Jungle in Everybody's Magazine of August
- 1928 : The Medicine Man in Munsey's October
- 1928 : The Stolen Teak Logs in Munsey's of December
- 1929 : Lone Dog in Munsey's of January
- 1929 : Kim Lai in Munsey's of February
- 1929 : The Bridge in the Jungle in The Popular Magazine of March 2
- 1929 : Thunderstorm in Munsey's of March
- 1929 : Tiger in Frontier Stories of August
- 1930 : The Elephant King a jungle novel ( This Animal Is Dangerous )

Published in France for the first time in 1935; Paris: Editions of the "New Critical Review," collection "of Angles' n o 16; translated by Hélène Jeandidier; 253 p. Reissue in 1946, Paris, G.-T. Rageot, "Happy Hours" collection; illustrations by Roger Treille.

- 1931 : The Death of the Tiger ( Death in Tiger Valley )

Published in France for the first time in 1936; Paris: Hachette collection "The Best Foreign Novels"; translated by Marie-Louise Chaulin; 252 p. Reissue in 1948, 1950, Paris, Hachette, collection " Green Library, "rad. Marie-Louise Chaulin, illustrations by Mixi; 1952, Hachette, collection of great novelists.

- 1935 Jungle Night

1935 : In the Siamese Forest ( Teak-Wallah ) 1

- Published in France for the 1 st time in 1950; Paris: Hachette, "Youth of the World" collection; translated by Jean Muray; 255 p.
- 1935 : Poo Lorn the Elephant ( Poo Lorn of the Elephants )

Published in France for the first time in 1935; Paris: Hachette, collection "The Best Foreign Novels"; translated by Marie-Louise Chaulin; 256 p. Reedition in 1946, Paris, Hachette, " Green Library " collection translated by M.-L. Chaulin, illustrations by André Hofer; 1952, H; Hachettedeal-Library collection, illustrations by François Batet .; 1964, daily L'Humanité, published in serial, put in images by Jean Dorville.

- 1936 : Adventures in a Teak Jungles in Mine of May
- 1937 : Terror in the forest Fear in the Forest

Published in France for the first time in 1937; Paris: Hachette, collection "The Best Foreign Novels"; translated by Maurice Rémon; 256 p. Reissue in 1947, Paris, " Green Library " collection, trans. Maurice Rémon, illustrations by Henri Faivre.

- 1938 : The Obsession of Katheleen Saunders ( The Haunting of Kathleen Saunders )

Published in France for the 1 st time in 1951, Paris, Librairie des Champs-Elysees, collection " The Mask " n o 392, translated by Perrine Vernay; 253 p.

- 1939 : Gunroom mess or The Admiralty Regrets
- 1939 : The Siamese Lizard ( The Bangkok Murders )

Published in France for the first time in 1946; Paris, Editions Rouff, coll. " The Key " n o 41

- 1940 : Cruiser in Action
- 1947 : His Majesty the Tiger ( Striped Majesty )

Published in France for the first time in 1956; Paris, Brussels, Editions de l'Amitié, collection "Happy Hours" Nature n o 103; translated by Germaine Guillemot-Magitot, illustrations by R. Dallet; 208 p. Reissue in 1978, Paris: Gallimard, collection Folio junior, translated by Mr. Guillemot-Magitot, illustrations by Bernard Héron, 189 p.

- 1947 : Coffin for a Murderer
- 1948 : The Abominable Twilight
- 1949 : Death by Apparition 2
- 1949 : The Elephant Valley ( The Keepers of Elephant Valley )
- Published in France for the first time in 1949; Paris: G.-T. Rageot, "Happy Hours" collection; translated by Germaine Guillemot-Magitot, illustrations by H. Camus; 257 p. Reissues: 1960, 1961, 1965: Paris, Editions of Friendship, "Library of friendship" collection.
- 1949 : Tiger! Tiger! in Jungle Stories, winter issue
- 1952 : Murder of my Wife
- 1952 : Murder she Says
