= Reginald Barlow =

American actor (1866–1943)

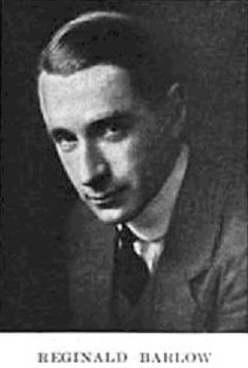
- Barlow in Pearson's Magazine, July 1910
- Born: Reginald Harry Barlow; June 17, 1866; Cambridge, Massachusetts, U.S.
- Died: July 6, 1943 (aged 77); Hollywood, Los Angeles, California, U.S.
- Other name: Major Reginald Barlow
- Occupation: Actor
- Years active: 1915–1943
- Spouses: Selma Rose (m. 1903; died 1933) Carol Brown (m. 1934)

Reginald Harry Barlow (June 17, 1866, – July 6, 1943) was an American stage and screen character actor, author, and film director. He was a busy performer in Hollywood films of the 1930s.

== Early life ==
A native of Cambridge, Massachusetts, and son of the old-time minstrel, Milt G. Barlow (1843–1904), Barlow made his stage debut at the age of twelve in his father's minstrel troupe of Barlow, Wilson, Primrose, and West.

Barlow joined the 2nd (Special Service) Battalion of The Royal Canadian Regiment on October 22, 1899, for service in South Africa during the Second Boer War. According to newspaper and other accounts, he also served in the United States Army during the Spanish–American War and World War I, and eventually rose to the rank of full colonel in 1923.

Barlow had thoughts of quitting the stage for the church in 1908 and at the time remarked to an interviewer: "All my ancestors have been soldiers, actors, and ministers, and some of them all three. I am a direct descendant of Bishop Barlow of the days of Henry VIII."

== Career ==
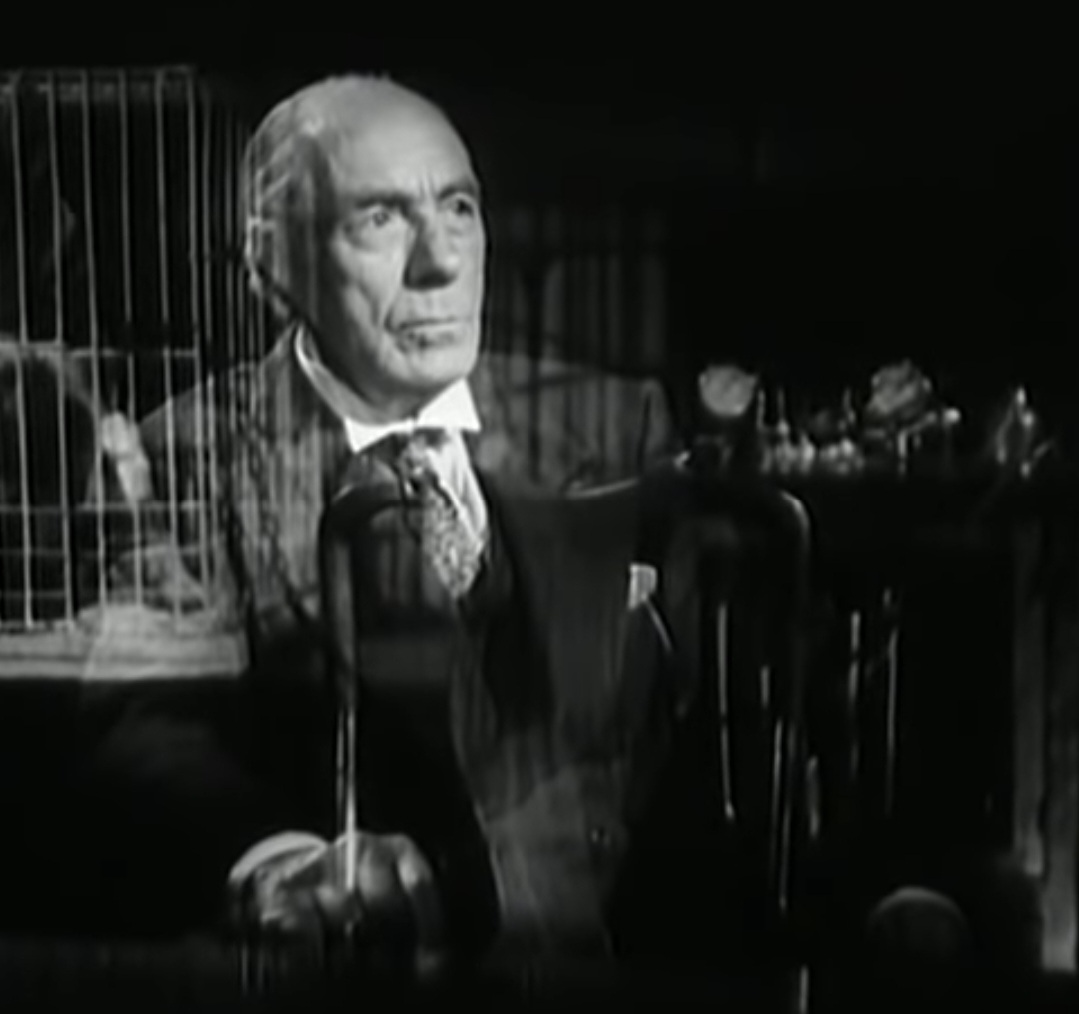
Barlow in The Mad Monster (1942)

In the early part of his stage career, he had leading roles in The Silver King, Monte Cristo, The Sign of the Cross, Old Lady 31, and The Little Princess.

Among his early silent films were The Cinema Murder (1919), the post-World War I drama Love's Flame in which he played the father-in-law: "M. De Ronsard", and the comedy Clothes Make the Pirate (1925) in which he played "Captain Montague", a cameo. After the changeover to sound, Barlow usually played men of means, such as military officers, senators, and bankers, turning up as a college professor in Horse Feathers (1932), with the Marx Brothers, a chaplain in Ann Vickers (1933), the sheriff in Tower of London (1939), and the Professor Warwick ostracizing mad scientist George Zucco in The Mad Monster (1942).

=== American Legion ===
Barlow was elected to The Lambs in 1916 in New York. After the Great War, he was named post-commander of American Legion Post 742. Founded in December 1919 by Lambs and Players, meeting at The Lambs. All of the members were veterans.

Further, as the Hollywood Post 43 was often included in the older films without giving any actual credit as to which members of the Post were shown within the films, it is highly likely that Barlow did also often appear in films as an uncredited member of Hollywood Post 43.

=== Director ===
Barlow functioned as a director of play companies before switching over to film. He was director of the Wright Huntington Players, narrated for the Eveready Hour, and on at least one occasion directed a film itself. It appears Barlow did play a director's sort of role in several films much as did Alfred Hitchcock, who was known to have made at least a cameo appearance in every one of his films. His film The Toy Maker of Leyden (1915) is listed as The Magic Toy Maker in Hanson & Givenson, eds. American Film Institute Catalogue Index, vol. F1, 1911–1920.

=== Family ===
Barlow married at least six times. He said in the 1930 Census that he was 22 years old at his first marriage. The service records for 7012 Lance Corporal R.H. Barlow of The Royal Canadian Regiment showed that he was married, with two children, in 1899 on enlistment for the South African War. His name is presented variously in the service record as "R.H. Barlow", "Reginald H. Barlow", "Reginald Barry Barlow", and "Reginald Harry Barlow".

Barlow married Florence Mary Alice Hamilton (1879-1945), on Jul 1, 1901, in Houghton, Michigan. According to a news article "Romance with Gay Deceiver", St Joseph News Press Gazette, Sunday, Aug 23, 1903, pg. 2, Florence and Reginald separated on January 1, 1902, however, they had not filed for divorce. In 1903, she discovered that he had married Clare Danforth and Clare was pregnant. It is at that time, she filed for divorce. She later married Hiram Abrams (1878-1926). According to Grace Barlow's (1905-1954) marriage record, her parents are Reginald Barlow and Florence Hamilton There is some question in this regard as her parents separated in 1902, divorced in 1903 and Grace was not born until 1905. In the 1920 United States Census and her marriage records, she is listed as Grace Abrams, daughter of Florence and her second husband Hiram Abrams. However, they did not marry until 1916. In June 1923, Florence and Hiram lie about their marriage date, giving the year as 1904, which would make it prior to Grace's birth. In her 1930 marriage record, she is shown as Grace Barlow, with Reginald as her father. Her obituary lists her as Grace Barlow McKeen.

Barlow married Clare Danforth, on April 15, 1902, in Charleston, Missouri. They had a daughter Margaret June Barlow b. 28 Feb 1903 in Chicago, Illinois Reginald had been using the name Reginald Livingston when he married Clare. In 1903, Clare discovered that Reginald had married Bertha Merkel. Clare and Reginald had been neither separated nor divorced. She filed for divorce February 9, 1904, according to the notice published in the Enterprise-Courier, Charleston, Missouri, Friday, April 1, 1904, the case going to court on April 7, 1904. Clare later married Frank Elwood Farr (1873-1933). Margaret changed her name to Margaret Emily Livingston/Livingstone by 1910. She married Glen Dewey Haskell (1898–1943) and later, Spencer Seymour Brown (1906–1966). Both marriages ended in divorce.

Barlow married Milwaukee heiress Bertha Merkel (1873-1933) (aka: Selma Rose a New York actress), the daughter of George and Mary Merkel, on August 6, 1903 in Los Angeles, California Following their marriage, a scandal commenced accusing Reginald of bigamy. News article covered papers across the country. As you can see from documentation noted above, he was married to more than one woman at a time, but later the wives divorced him. They had one daughter, June Barlow (1904-1904).

There is a record for a marriage to Martha M. Merkel, June 22, 1927 in Manhattan, New York. No other information has been found.

Barlow married Carol Brown of Pasadena, California) April 11, 1934 in Tijuana, Mexico, according to the Los Angeles Times April 19, 1934, pg. 12.

Barlow married Carol Katherine Uselding (1894–1956) (aka C. Katherine B. Phipps) July 3, 1935 in Los Angeles, California She returned to her first husband, John Mitchell Riordan (1879-1963)

== Filmography ==
=== Actor ===
- Monsieur Lecoq (1915) - Otto, the Duke's Valet
- The Cinema Murder (1919) - Power's 'Man Friday'
- Love's Flame (1920) - Monsieur De Rosard
- Clothes Make the Pirate (1925) - Captain Montague
- The Sin of Madelon Claudet (1931) - Public Assistance Official (uncredited)
- Are These Our Children? (1931) - Judge (uncredited)
- Mata Hari (1931) - Prosecutor (uncredited)
- This Reckless Age (1932) - Lester Bell
- The Woman from Monte Carlo (1932) - Defense Attorney
- Alias the Doctor (1932) - The Professor (uncredited)
- The Wet Parade (1932) - Judge Brandon
- The World and the Flesh (1932) - Markov
- Night Court (1932) - District Attorney Grant (uncredited)
- State's Attorney (1932) - Last Trial Judge (uncredited)
- Sinners in the Sun (1932) - Mr. Blake
- As You Desire Me (1932) - Dr. Reinhardt (uncredited)
- The Washington Masquerade (1932) - Sen. Withers
- Skyscraper Souls (1932) - Brewster's Associate (uncredited)
- Horse Feathers (1932) - Retiring College President (uncredited)
- Speak Easily (1932) - Billington (uncredited)
- The Age of Consent (1932) - Mr. Swale - Dora's father
- The All American (1932) - Bank President
- I Am a Fugitive from a Chain Gang (1932) - Mr. Parker (uncredited)
- Evenings for Sale (1932) - Mr. Meyer (uncredited)
- Afraid to Talk (1932) - Judge MacMurray
- If I Had a Million (1932) - Otto K. Bullwinkle (uncredited)
- Rasputin and the Empress (1932) - General Who Underestimated the Japanese (uncredited)
- Parachute Jumper (1933) - The Colonel (uncredited)
- Goldie Gets Along (1933) - Uncle Saunders (uncredited)
- Grand Slam (1933) - Theodore (uncredited)
- King Kong (1933) - Ship's Engineer (uncredited)
- Fast Workers (1933) - Judge (uncredited)
- The Big Cage (1933) - John Whipple
- His Private Secretary (1933) - Mr. Wallace
- Midnight Mary (1933) - Trial Judge (uncredited)
- Doctor Bull (1933) - Supporter #1 for Dr. Bull (uncredited)
- Ann Vickers (1933) - Chaplain
- Day of Reckoning (1933) - Judge (uncredited)
- Flying Down to Rio (1933) - The Banker
- You Can't Buy Everything (1934) - Mr. Tom Sparks
- The Cat and the Fiddle (1934) - King's Aide in Show (uncredited)
- Half a Sinner (1934) - Sheriff John King
- Operator 13 (1934) - Col. Storm (uncredited)
- Stamboul Quest (1934) - German Officer (uncredited)
- Beyond the Law (1934) - Judge
- One Night of Love (1934) - Stage Manager (uncredited)
- Great Expectations (1934) - Judge (uncredited)
- Cheating Cheaters (1934) - Police Captain (uncredited)
- Romance in Manhattan (1935) - Customs Inspector
- The Gilded Lily (1935) - Managing Editor (uncredited)
- Mutiny Ahead (1935) - Captain Martin
- A Dog of Flanders (1935) - Official with Court Order (uncredited)
- Les Misérables (1935) - Henri (uncredited)
- Cardinal Richelieu (1935) - Agitator
- Bride of Frankenstein (1935) - Hans
- Red Blood of Courage (1935) - Mark Henry / Pete Drago
- Strangers All (1935) - Judge
- Werewolf of London (1935) - Timothy, Falden Caretaker (uncredited)
- Hooray for Love (1935) - Doug's Lawyer (uncredited)
- The Last Days of Pompeii (1935) - The Janitor of the Slave Market (uncredited)
- Captain Blood (1935) - Dixon (uncredited)
- White Lies (1935) - Judge (uncredited)
- I Dream Too Much (1935)
- A Tale of Two Cities (1935)
- Little Lord Fauntleroy (1936) - Newick
- O'Malley of the Mounted (1936) - Commissioner
- The Girl from Mandalay (1936) - Dr. Collins
- The Last of the Mohicans (1936) - Duke of Newcastle
- Lloyd's of London (1936) - Second Captain
- The Great Barrier (1937) - James Hill - Member of C.P.R. Board
- The Road Back (1937) - Manager (uncredited)
- The Toast of New York (1937) - Mr. Taylor - Hotel Proprietor (uncredited)
- Saturday's Heroes (1937) - History Professor (uncredited)
- Thoroughbreds Don't Cry (1937) - Man Seated Behind Mr. Sloan (uncredited)
- The Adventures of Marco Polo (1938) - Giuseppi - Venetian Business Man (uncredited)
- Mysterious Mr. Moto (1938) - Policeman (uncredited)
- Daredevils of the Red Circle (1939) - Doctor in Hospital [Ch. 1] (uncredited)
- Heritage of the Desert (1939) - Judge Stevens
- The Man in the Iron Mask (1939) - Jean Paul
- Colorado Sunset (1939) - Dairyman Casey (uncredited)
- Wall Street Cowboy (1939) - Bainbridge
- New Frontier (1939) - Judge Bill Lawson
- Dick Tracy's G-Men (1939) - Dr. Alfred Guttenbach (uncredited)
- The Witness Vanishes (1939) - Sir John Digby
- Rovin' Tumbleweeds (1939) - Higgins - a Migrant
- Tower of London (1939) - Sherriff (uncredited)
- The Courageous Dr. Christian (1940) - Sam
- Scotland Yard (1941) - Messenger (uncredited)
- The Mad Monster (1942) - Professor Warwick
- Syncopation (1942) - Hobo Reading Paper (uncredited)
- The Mayor of 44th Street (1942) - Watchman (uncredited)
- Law of the Northwest (1943) - Jean Darcy (final film role)

== Notes ==
1 Confer Los Angeles Times, Friday Morning, 14 Sep 1934, Part I, p. 15, col. 2, article: "Reginald Barlow to Play Lead in 'Blood on Moon'." The article clearly states that he "began his theatrical career at the age of 12 in his father's troupe."

2 See Bunches of Barlows link which clearly shows Reginald, a confirmed member of the American Legion Hollywood Post 43, to be a Colonel. The picture there also shows him presenting Shirley Temple with a certificate as a new "Honorary Colonel" in 1935. The same website also shows that in the New York Times of 7 July 1943, Reginald Barlow was a Colonel who commanded the 304th Infantry in World War I for the United States, and was a veteran of two other wars: the Spanish–American War and The Second Boer War.

3 See also: Keffer, History of San Fernando Valley (1934), pp. 118–120; where it in fact states that Barlow commanded the 302nd Infantry as a Major, and then was later given the command of the 349th as a Lieutenant-Colonel during World War I.

4 Confer Los Angeles Daily Times, Friday, 28 Aug 1903, p. 4, cols. 3–4, article: "Actor Barlow's Wife".

== Citations ==
- Los Angeles Daily Times, Monday, 10 Aug 1903, p. 9, col. 1, article: "Lost Heart on Pullman"
- Los Angeles Sunday Times, 23 Aug 1903, p. 4, cols. 6–7, article: "Bride's Momma After Actor Reggie Barlow"
- Los Angeles Daily Times, Friday, 28 Aug 1903, p. 4, cols. 3–4, article: "Actor Barlow's Wife"
- The Stars and Stripes, Vol 1, No 50, France, Friday, 17 Jan 1919, p. 2, col. 4, article: "Show Each Night, Plan of Biggest Booking Agency"
- Los Angeles Times, Friday Morning, 14 Sep 1934, Part I, p. 15, col. 2, article: "Reginald Barlow to Play Lead in 'Blood on Moon'."
- New York Times, Wednesday, 7 Jul 1943, p. 19, col. 3, article: "R. Barlow is Dead; Actor and Soldier"
- Frank M. Keffer, History of San Fernando Valley (1934), R 979.41 L88Ke, pp. 118–120, bio entitled: "Col. Reginald Barlow"
- Variety, 14 Jul 1943, article: "Obituaries, Reginald Barlow"
- Los Angeles Daily Times, Monday, 10 Aug 1903, p. 9, col. 1, article: "Lost Heart on Pullman"
- "The Inter Ocean", Monday, 22 Aug, 1904, p. 12, article: "Captured Girl Who Escaped Convent"
- "Charleston Courier", Charleston, Missouri, Thursday, March 10, 1904, "Order of Publication", Clare (Danforth) Livingston files for divorce against Reginald Livingston (aka Reginald Barlow)
- "The Weekly Enterprise", Charleston, Missouri, Friday, 1 April 1904, "Dockett, April Term, Mississippi County Circuit Court, Schedule" Clare Livingston vs. Reginald Barlow Livingston case scheduled for 7 April 1904.
- "St. Joseph News Press Gazette" St. Joseph, Missouri, Sunday, Aug 23, 1903, p. 2, article: "Romance with Gay Deceiver" wife Florence Hamilton tells her story of their marriage.
- "Charleston Courier" Charleston, Missouri, Thursday, 20 Aug 1903, article: "Is a Bigamist", Reginald Barlow accused of bigamy.
- "Weekly Enterprise", Charleston, Missouri, Friday, 21 Aug 1903, p. 1, article: "Barlow is a Bigamist", accuses Reginald Barlow of bigamy.
- "The San Francisco Call", San Francisco, California, Monday, 10 Aug 1903, p. 3, article: "Actor Marries Young Heiress", Reginald Barlow and Bertha Merkel Marriage.
- "The Fresno Morning Republican", Fresno, California, Saturday, 15 Aug 1903, article: "Three Women Claim Barlow", accuses Reginald Barlow of bigamy
- "The Los Angeles Times", Los Angeles, California, Saturday, 10 Dec 1932, article: "Reginald Barlow Hurt"
- "The Los Angeles Times", Los Angeles, California, Saturday, 8 Jul 1933, article: "Barlow, Owns Dog Hero"
- "The Los Angeles Times", Los Angeles, California, Tuesday, Jul 18, 1933, article: "Will be Remarried" Reginald Barlow and Bertha Merkel to reenact marriage after 30 years.
- "The Los Angeles Times", Los Angeles, California, 22 Nov 1933, p. 24, article: "Mrs. Barlow, Wife of Actor Taken by Death", Bertha (Merkel) Barlow, Obituary
- "The Los Angeles Times", Los Angeles, California, Friday, 14 May 1943, article: "Vocalist Wins Dogfight Suit", against Reginald Barlow
- "The Los Angeles Times", Los Angeles, California, Saturday, 13 Feb 1937 "Legion Arena Honors Shirley Temple", Col. Reginald Barlow
- "The Los Angeles Times", Los Angeles, California, Thursday, 19 Apr 1934 brief note: Reginald Barlow and Carol Brown Wed in Tijuana, Mexico
- "Hollywood Citizen News", Los Angeles, California, Wednesday, 7 Jul 1943, article: "Long III Actor Dies", Reginald Barlow, Obituary
- "The Topeka State Journal" Milwaukee, Wisconsin, Saturday 15 Aug 1903, article: "Meets on Train and Wed", Reginald Barlow and Bertha Merkle marriage.
- "Historical Dictionary of American Theater Modernism" by James Fisher and Felicia Hardison Londre, copyright 2018, pg 60, brief biography of Reginald Barlow
- "Enterprise-Courier:", Charleston, Missouri, Friday, April 18, 1902, p. 7, "Livingstone-Danforth" marriage
