= Horse Play =

1933 film directed by Edward Sedgwick

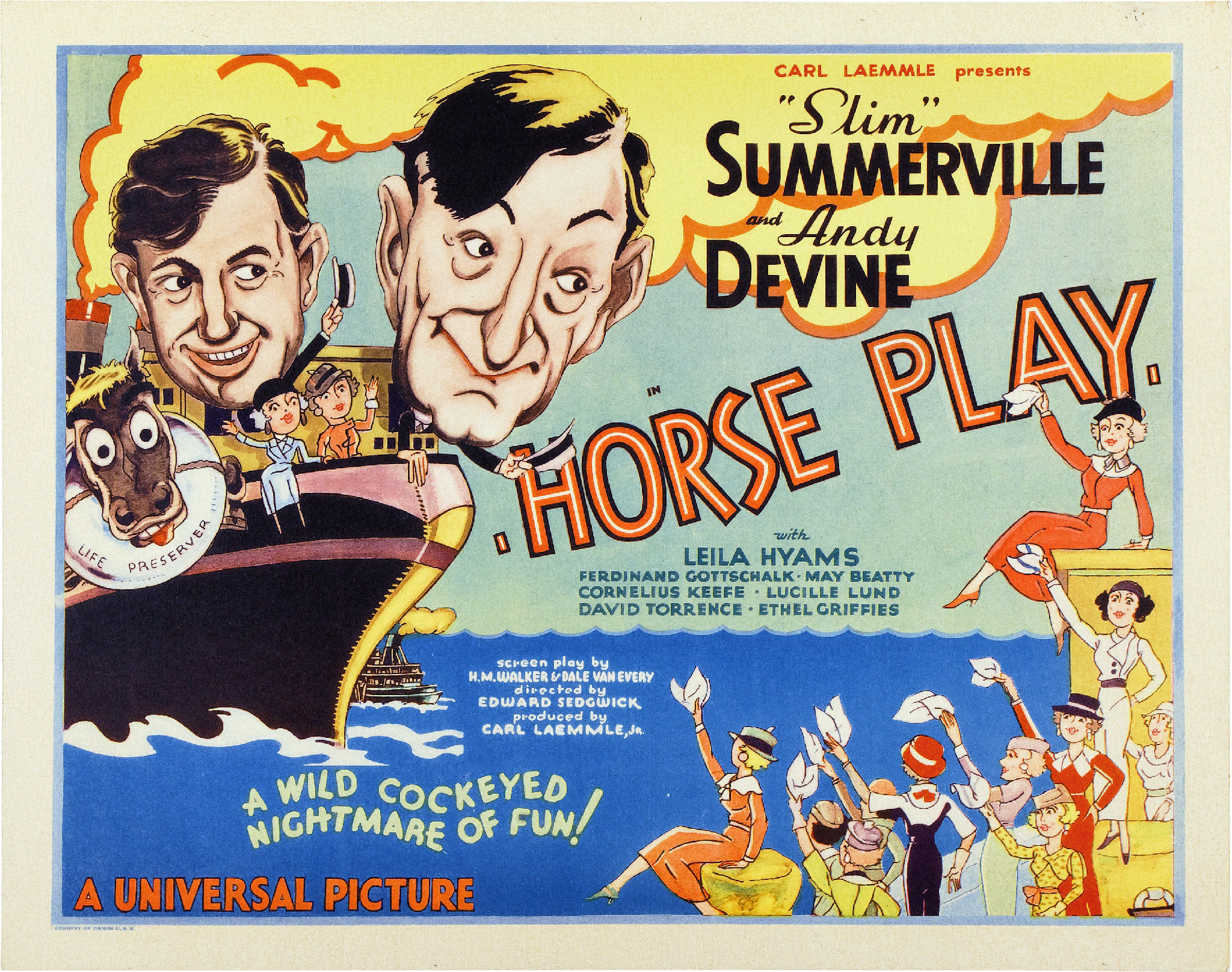
- Theatrical release poster
- Directed by: Edward Sedgwick
- Screenplay by: H. M. Walker; Dale Van Every
- Story by: Ebba Havez; Clarence Marks
- Produced by: Carl Laemmle, Jr.
- Starring: Slim Summerville; Andy Devine; Leila Hyams; May Beatty; Una O'Connor; David Torrence
- Cinematography: George Robinson
- Edited by: Robert Carlisle
- Production company: Universal Pictures
- Distributed by: Universal Pictures
- Release date: June 1, 1933
- Running time: 67 minutes
- Country: United States
- Language: English

Horse Play is a 1933 American pre-Code comedy film directed by Edward Sedgwick and written by H. M. Walker and Dale Van Every. The film stars Slim Summerville, Andy Devine, Leila Hyams, May Beatty, Una O'Connor and David Torrence. The film was released on June 1, 1933, by Universal Pictures.

== Cast ==
- Slim Summerville as Slim Perkins
- Andy Devine as Andy
- Leila Hyams as Angelica Wayne
- May Beatty as The Duchess
- Una O'Connor as Clementia
- David Torrence as Uncle Percy
- Cornelius Keefe as Philip Marley
- Ferdinand Gottschalk as Oswald
- Ethel Griffies as Emily
- Lucille Lund as Iris
