= Yellow Dust (film) =

1936 film

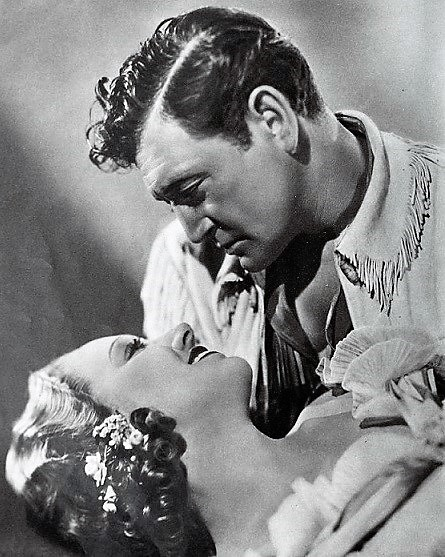
- Film still with Richard Dix and Leila Hyams
- Directed by: Wallace Fox; Jimmy Anderson (assistant)
- Screenplay by: Cyril Hume; John Twist; John Francis Larkin
- Based on: Mother Lode; 1934 play by Dan Totheroh and George O'Neil
- Produced by: Cliff Reid
- Starring: Richard Dix; Leila Hyams
- Cinematography: Edward Cronjager
- Edited by: James Morley
- Music by: Alberto Colombo
- Production company: RKO Radio Pictures
- Release dates: February 22, 1936 (Premiere-New York City); March 13, 1936 (US)
- Running time: 68 minutes
- Country: United States
- Language: English

Yellow Dust is a 1936 American Western film starring Richard Dix and Leila Hyams, with a supporting cast including Moroni Olsen, Jessie Ralph, Andy Clyde, and Onslow Stevens. It was directed by Wallace Fox from a screenplay by Cyril Hume, John Twist, and John Francis Larkin. RKO Radio Pictures premiered the film in New York City on February 22, 1936, with a nationwide release on March 13.

== Plot ==
Bob Culpepper is a college-educated mining engineer from Tennessee who has chosen to become a gold prospector in the hills of California. He witnesses a gold-panner about to get bushwhacked by a claim-jumper and fires a warning shot. A vigorous gun battle between the prospector and his assailant leaves the bushwhacker dead.

Seeking to learn more about the conflict, Culpepper rides down to the prospector's camp. He has to lean on the ornery older man, Silas "Solitaire" Carter, to even bury his foe. While digging the grave together, Culpepper discovers a gold-bearing vein, which he deduces runs clear up the mountain to a mother lode. Eager to profit from their discovery, Carter and Culpepper agree to join forces, then head to the nearest town to file a land claim on the strike at Spanish Gulch.

On the way, the pair witness a gang of outlaws robbing a stagecoach. They open fire and drive the robbers off. Among the passengers is a lovely saloon singer, Nellie Brian, headed to an engagement in town. Culpepper is instantly smitten with her. Brian is also attracted to him, but her mother urges her to focus on her singing career and a more prestigious billing in a city to follow.

At the town, Brian meets her new boss, Jack Hanway, the prosperous owner of a local saloon. Brian eventually confesses her love to Culpepper, and also tells him about a keepsake necklace which the outlaws had stolen from her. Culpepper tracks the necklace to the hands of one of the stage robbers, big roughhewn "Missouri". He forces the outlaw to hand over the necklace, but leaves him the rest of his loot.

Trying to impress Brian and outshine Culpepper, Hanway stages a robbery at his own saloon. His gang is supposed to stick the place up, giving Hanway the chance to play the hero. Culpepper thwarts the farago and seeks to reveal it as a sham. Instead, he is accused of masterminding the stage coach robbery and being in possession of the loot. Missouri fingers him for having the stolen necklace in his shirt pocket. He is arrested and jailed. Brian is shocked into accepting that Culpepper is a two-faced crook.

With his rival out of the way, Hanway romances Brian. After bidding her goodnight he carelessly explains his plan to file a claim on Spanish Gulch to his hoodlums gathered below Brian's hotel window. Overhearing it, she tries to alert the drunken Carter, but he is too soused to be roused. Brian tricks Hanway into delaying filing the claim till after breakfast, then sneaks off in the morning and registers one herself. Sobered up, Carter is shocked to learn what she has done, and informs Culpepper. Culpepper reluctantly believes the worst. He convinces his cellmate Missouri, who recognizes he's being used by Hanway, to help him escape from jail.

Culpepper abducts Brian and puts her in a straitjacket lifted from the jail. He slowly rides her tandem into the remote countryside. Their time together allows them to clear the misunderstandings and express their love for one-another. Upon arriving at Spanish Gulch the next morning, they are captured by Hanway and his gang.

Hanway wants Brian both as the sole legitimate owner of the gold claim and for her beauty and charm. He proposes marriage. Stalling for time, she accepts, while Carter organizes Culpepper's rescue. Aided by a reformed Missouri, they successfully stave off his lynching and the threesome rushes back to town. Stopping the wedding in time, Culpepper calls Hanway out for a showdown, and shoots him dead. Back in eachother's arms, the blissful Culpepper and Brian hurtle towards wedlock.

== Cast ==
The cast of this film according to the American Film Institute, includes:

- Richard Dix as Bob Culpepper
- Leila Hyams as Nellie Brian
- Moroni Olsen as "Missouri"
- Jessie Ralph as Mrs. Brian
- Andy Clyde as Silas "Solitaire" Carter
- Onslow Stevens as Jack Hanway
- Victor Potel as Jugger
- Ethan Laidlaw as Bogan
- Ted Oliver as McLearney

== Production ==
According to the American Film Institute, the film is based on the 1934 theatrical play Mother Lode written by George O'Neil and Dan Totheroh.

According to 1936 articles of The Hollywood Reporter, the role of the female lead in this film was intended for Helen Gahagan Douglas.

Production charts for this film dating to the 1930s seem to contradict other sources. The charts mention acting roles for Dorothy Coburn, George Lollier, and Art Mix. Their possible involvement in the film is not mentioned by other sources. The charts do not credit Cyril Hume and John Twist as screenwriters, but they credit John Francis Larkin. Larkin's involvement is not always mentioned by other sources, and it is unclear if he contributed to the final script. The charts credit John Tribby for the sound recording of the film, while other sources credit Earl A. Wolcott.

Some scenes for this film were reportedly filmed in the vicinity of Sonora, California.
