= Stepping Out (1931 film) =

1931 film

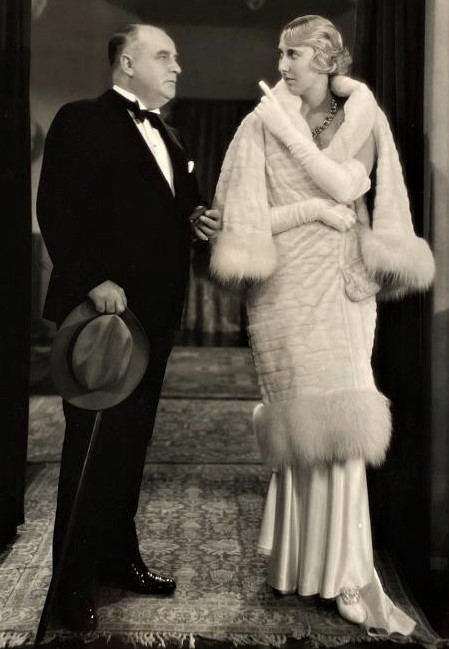
- Harry Stubbs and Charlotte Greenwood in the film
- Directed by: Charles Reisner; Sandy Roth (ass't director)
- Written by: Elmer Harris (dialogue); Robert E. Hopkins (dialogue)
- Based on: Stepping Out by Elmer Blaney Harris
- Produced by: Metro Goldwyn Mayer
- Starring: Charlotte Greenwood; Leila Hyams
- Cinematography: Leonard Smith
- Edited by: William S. Gray
- Distributed by: Metro-Goldwyn-Mayer
- Release date: April 11, 1931
- Running time: 73 minutes
- Country: United States
- Language: English

Stepping Out is a 1931 American Pre-Code farce directed by Charles Reisner and produced and distributed by Metro-Goldwyn-Mayer. It is based on the 1929 Broadway play Stepping Out by Elmer Harris. Lilian Bond appeared in the original Broadway play and in this film in the same role.

== Cast ==
- Charlotte Greenwood as Sally Smith
- Leila Hyams as Eve Martin
- Reginald Denny as Tom Martin
- Lilian Bond as Cleo Del Rio
- Cliff Edwards as Paul Perkins
- Merna Kennedy as Madge
- Harry Stubbs as Tubby Smith
- Richard Tucker as Charley Miller
- Kane Richmond as Hal Rogers
- Wilson Benge as Parker
