= High, Wide and Handsome =

1937 film by Rouben Mamoulian

- Promotional poster
- Directed by: Rouben Mamoulian
- Written by: Oscar Hammerstein II; George O'Neil
- Produced by: Arthur Hornblow Jr.
- Starring: Irene Dunne; Randolph Scott; Dorothy Lamour
- Cinematography: Victor Milner; Theodor Sparkuhl
- Edited by: Archie Marshek
- Music by: Jerome Kern
- Production company: Paramount Pictures
- Distributed by: Paramount Pictures
- Release date: July 21, 1937
- Running time: 110 minutes
- Country: United States
- Language: English
- Budget: $1.9 million

High, Wide and Handsome is a 1937 American musical Western film starring Irene Dunne, Randolph Scott, Alan Hale Sr., Charles Bickford and Dorothy Lamour. The film was directed by Rouben Mamoulian and written by Oscar Hammerstein II and George O'Neil, with lyrics by Hammerstein and music by Jerome Kern. It was released by Paramount Pictures.

The musical recounts the history of Pennsylvania farmers in 1859 who discovered crude oil deposits on their land. When railroad barons attempt to charge exorbitant freight fees, the hardy agrarians successfully build their own pipeline to the refinery, fending off attacks by corporation-hired thugs en route. The film includes the romantic setting of the Cortlandt Ranch, where Sally (Irene Dunne) and Peter (Randolph Soctt) discover love in an enchanted idyll, and commune with the farm animals.

"High, wide, and handsome" is an American idiom generally expressing praise, or sometimes describing a carefree attitude.

== Plot ==
In 1859, Doc Watterson brings his traveling medicine show to Titusville, Pennsylvania. After the show wagon is destroyed by an accidental fire, Mrs. Cortlandt and her grandson Peter invite the Wattersons and the show's fake Indian, Mac, to stay with them. Peter and Sally Watterson fall in love.

Railroad tycoon Walt Brennan wants to acquire the land of several oil-drilling farmers, led by Peter Cortlandt. The townspeople block the plan, assisted by a herd of circus elephants, and instead construct their own oil pipeline.

== Cast ==
- Irene Dunne as Sally Watterson
- Randolph Scott as Peter Cortlandt
- Dorothy Lamour as Molly Fuller
- Elizabeth Patterson as Grandma Cortlandt
- Raymond Walburn as Doc Watterson
- Charles Bickford as Red Scanlon
- Akim Tamiroff as Joe Varese
- Ben Blue as Zeke
- William Frawley as Mac
- Alan Hale Sr. as Walt Brennan
- Irving Pichel as Mr. Stark
- Stanley Andrews as Lem Moulton
- James Burke as Stackpole
- Roger Imhof as Pop Bowers
- Lucien Littlefield as Mr. Lippincott

== Songs ==
- "High, Wide and Handsome" (sung by Irene Dunne)
- "Can I Forget You?" (Irene Dunne)
- "The Things I Want' (Dorothy Lamour)
- "Allegheny Al" (Irene Dunne and Dorothy Lamour)
- "Will You Marry Me Tomorrow, Maria? (William Frawley)
- "The Folks Who Live on the Hill" (Irene Dunne)

== Production ==
Paramount Pictures and producer Arthur Hornblow, Jr. conceived High, Wide and Handsome as a "big-budget" musical that would deliver "prestige entertainment" supported by a talented cast and crew.

High, Wide and Handsome was filmed on location in Chino, California. Principal filming began in early January 1937 and finished in late April that year, exceeding its 10-week shooting schedule.

The production was particularly challenging, both physically and operationally, due to "torrential rains, mudslides [and] equipment malfunctions." Tragically, a catastrophic accident during filming injured over a dozen of the cast and crew, some seriously.

With the assistance of Kern and Hammerstein, director Rouben Mamoulian attempted to firmly integrate the songs into the plot of the film to advance the storyline.

High, Wide and Handsome, budgeted at about $1.3 million, had a final cost of $1.8 million. The film was released October 1, 1937.

== Reception ==
Frank S. Nugent of The New York Times wrote: "A richly produced, spectacular and melodious show, it moves easily into the ranks of the season's best and probably is as good an all-around entertainment as we are likely to find on Broadway this summer." The Film Daily also gave a positive review and predicted that the film would be a box office success. It praised the "astute" direction of Mamoulian, "the wide range" of Kern's music, the technical achievement of the cinematography and the effectiveness and suitability of the performers.

Modern Screen’s Leo Townsend described the film as "the year's most puzzling picture", and explained, "Listed as a musical, it contains bits of everything, from industrial drama to downright melodrama. It starts out as a comedy, with Irene Dunne, of all people, dancing in a medicine show." He dismissed the musical contributions of Jerome Kern and wrote that the "score contains no outstanding numbers", but commented positively about the performances : "Irene Dunne is not at her best when she's called upon to sing, but she handles her acting assignment ably. Randolph Scott turns in one of his best performances as the young farmer, and Dorothy Lamour is good as a purveyor of torch ballads."

Variety reported that the film had "too much Hollywood hokum" and that it "flounders as it progresses, and winds up in a melodramatic shambles of fisticuffs, villainy and skullduggery which smacks of the serial film school."

Harrison's Reports called it "very good mass entertainment" with "delightful" music but a story that was "very weak."

Russell Maloney of The New Yorker wrote: "Mamoulian's handling of the story leaves something to be desired (he's pretty preoccupied with apple blossoms and hillsides) but the general effect of the picture is pleasant."

Writing for Night and Day in 1937, Graham Greene gave the film a poor review, characterizing it as "two hours of [a] long, dumb and dreary picture." Greene noted that the Hollywood aesthetics attributable to Mamoulian made the film unrealistic and improbable.

Film historian Marc Spergel writes that contemporary reviews "were generally favorable, if not enthusiastic. Commercially, the film did poorly, especially for its high production cost, and has since slid virtually into oblivion."
