= Harry Stubbs =

American actor

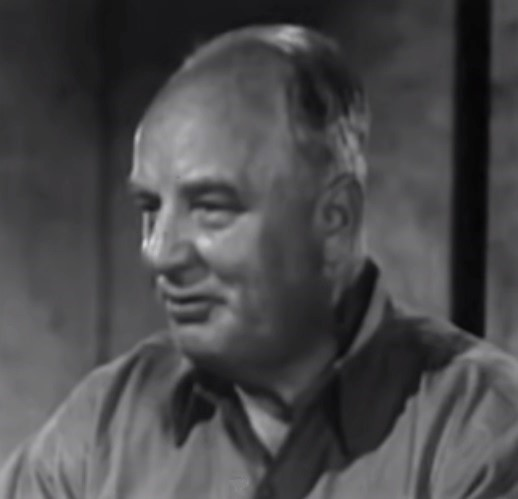
- Stubbs in Peck's Bad Boy with the Circus (1938)
- Born: Harry Oakes Stubbs; December 7, 1874; Southampton, Hampshire, United Kingdom
- Died: May 9, 1950 (aged 75); Los Angeles, California, United States
- Occupation: Actor
- Years active: 1929–1943

Harry Oakes Stubbs (December 7, 1874 – May 9, 1950) was an English-born American character actor, who appeared both on Broadway and in films. He was born on December 7, 1874, in Southampton, Hampshire, England. Stubbs immigrated from England at the age of 16, and made his first Broadway appearance at the age of 31 in The Bad Samaritan, which had a short run of fifteen performances in September 1905 at the Garden Theatre.

The Internet Broadway Database (IBDB) has him appearing in only eight plays over the next 23 years, the last of which was 1928's The Big Fight which had a month run at the Majestic Theatre in September/October 1928.

In 1929, he would move to Hollywood and begin his film career, which spanned the first fifteen years of the sound era of the industry; he would appear in over 50 films during that time. He also acted on stage in 1933 at Harold Lloyd's Beverly Hills Little Theatre for Professionals, which was a way to use his stage talent to be seen by more people in the film industry. At the beginning of his career in the movies, he would have several leading roles, as in his first film, Alibi, but for the most part he was relegated to the smaller roles of a character actor. Stubbs died on May 9, 1950, at the age of 75.

== Filmography ==
(Per AFI database) An asterisk denotes a leading or featured role.

- Alibi (1929) - Buck Bachman*
- The Locked Door (1929) - The waiter
- Three Live Ghosts (1929) - Bolton*
- The Bad One (1930) - Sailor #2
- Ladies Must Play (1930) - Stormfield "Stormey" Button*
- Night Ride (1930) - Bob O'Leary*
- The Truth About Youth (1930) - Horace Palmer
- Millie (1931) - Mark
- The Gang Buster (1931) - Faulkner
- Her Majesty, Love (1931) - Hanneman
- Fanny Foley Herself (1931) - Crosby
- Stepping Out (1931) - Tubby Smith
- The Man Who Played God (1932) - Chittendon
- Girl Without a Room (1933) - Art buyer
- The Mind Reader (1933) - Thompson
- The Invisible Man (1933) - Inspector Bird
- When Strangers Marry (1933) - Major Oliver
- All of Me (1934) - Second man in speakeasy
- Now and Forever (1934) - Mr. O'Neill
- Search for Beauty (1934) - Fat man in bed
- Captain Hurricane (1935) - Henry Stone
- The Spanish Cape Mystery (1935) - Sheriff Moley*
- Thanks a Million (1935) - Campaign manager
- It Had to Happen (1936) - Bailiff
- Sutter's Gold (1936) - John Jacob Astor*
- The White Angel (1936) - Sergeant
- The Man I Marry (1936) - Villager
- The Girl from Mandalay (1936) - Trevor
- Waikiki Wedding (1937) - Keith
- On the Avenue (1937) - Kelly
- London by Night (1937) - Postman
- Love and Hisses (1937)
- A Doctor's Diary (1937) - Dr. Walker
- In Old Chicago (1938) - Fire commissioner
- Peck's Bad Boy with the Circus (1938) - Hank
- Doctor Rhythm (1938) - Police captain
- I Stand Accused (1938) - Mr. Moss
- The Invisible Man Returns (1940) - Policeman
- A Dispatch from Reuters (1940) - Board member
- Waterloo Bridge (1940) - Proprietor of eating house
- Adventure in Diamonds (1940) - Stout man on boat
- The Mummy's Hand (1940) - Bartender
- Zanzibar (1940) - Alf
- Margie (1940) - Butler
- Burma Convoy (1941) - Hubert
- The Lady from Cheyenne (1941) - Doorman
- The Singing Hill (1941) - James Morgan*
- The Wolf Man (1941) - Reverend Norman
- Eagle Squadron (1942) - Cockney
- Sherlock Holmes and the Voice of Terror (1942) - Taxi driver
- Ten Gentlemen from West Point (1942) - Senator
- Flesh and Fantasy (1943) - Proprietor
- Frankenstein Meets the Wolf Man (1943) - Guno
