= May Beatty =

New Zealand singer and actress (1880–1945)

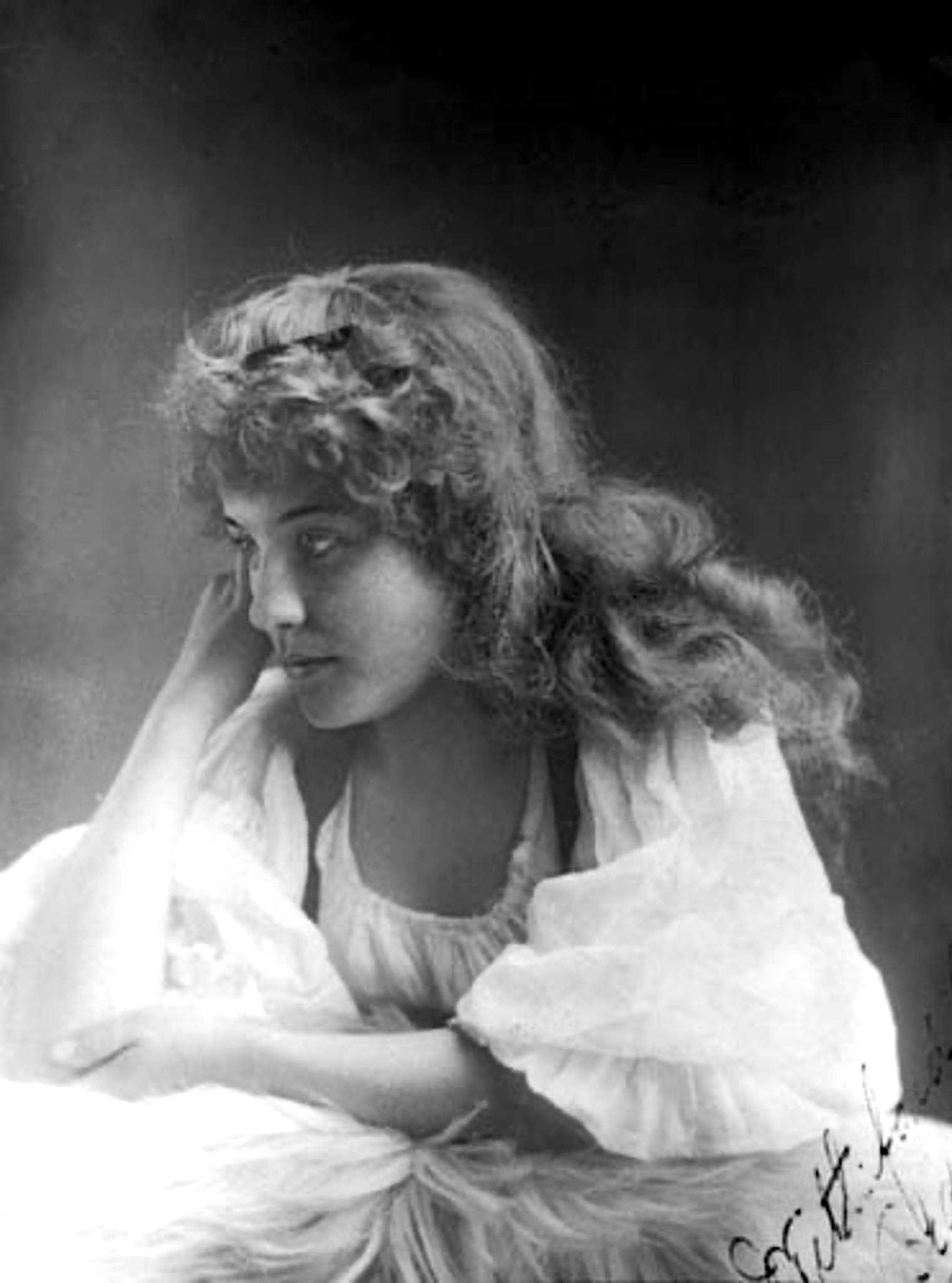
- Beatty before 1910
- Born: 4 June 1880; Christchurch, New Zealand
- Died: 1 April 1945 (aged 64); Hollywood, California, U.S.
- Occupation: Actress
- Years active: 1908–1943
- Spouse: Edward Lauri
- Children: 1

May Beatty (4 June 1880–1 April 1945) was a New Zealand singer and stage and screen actress. She was born in Christchurch, New Zealand, on 4 June 1880.

== Biography ==
Beatty began her performing career at age seven, touring with Pollard's Lilliputian Opera Company. Her first performances in England were in 1908. In 1923 she toured Australia with Hugh J. Ward's company, performing in musical comedies.

Beatty was married to Edward Lauri and had one daughter, Bonnie Beatty, a screen actress. She died in Hollywood.

== Partial filmography ==
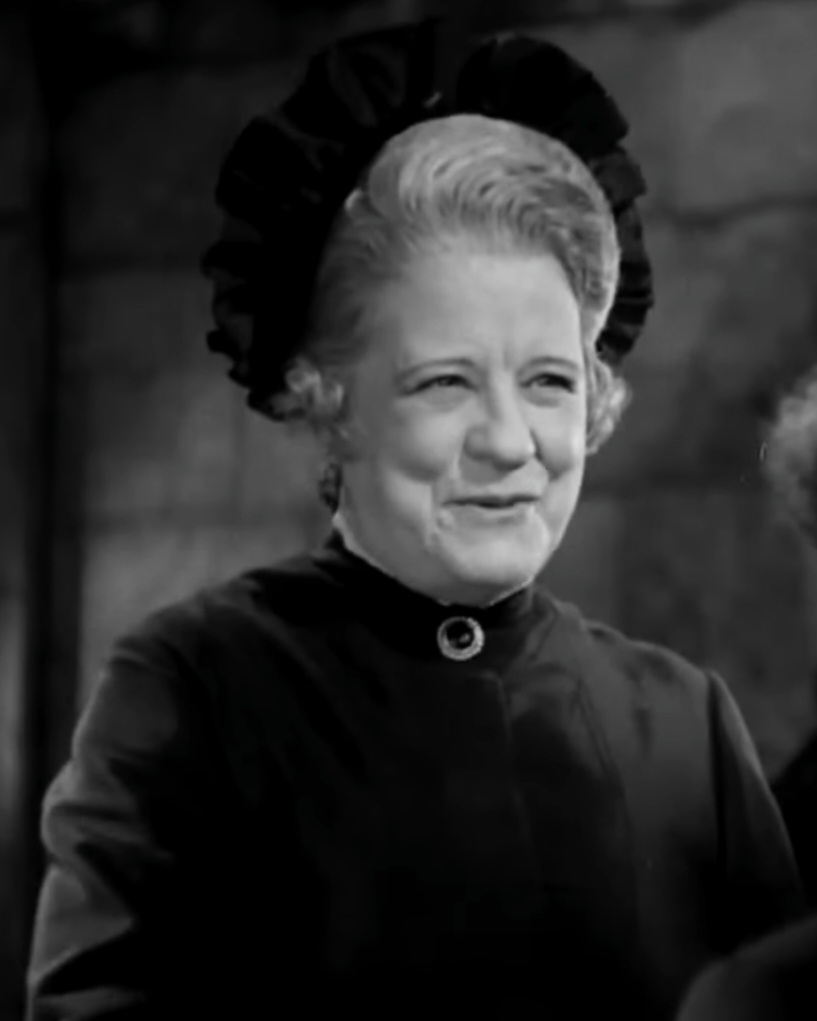
Beatty in Little Lord Fauntleroy (1936)

- Vanity Street (1932)
- Horse Play (1933)
- Rainbow Over Broadway (1933)
- Our Betters (1933)
- Love Is Dangerous (1933)
- Mad Love (1935)
- Becky Sharp (1935)
- The Widow from Monte Carlo (1935)
- The Girl Who Came Back (1935)
- Here Comes The Band (1935)
- Little Lord Fauntleroy (1936)
- Private Number (1936)
- Lloyd's of London (1936)
- If I Were King (1938)
- I Am a Criminal (1938)
- The Adventures of Sherlock Holmes (Mrs. Jameson) (1939)
