= George O'Neil =

American writer

- Born: September 13, 1896; St. Louis, Missouri, U.S.
- Died: May 23, 1940 (aged 43); Hollywood, California, U.S.
- Occupations: Film writer; novelist; playwright; poet

George O'Neil (13 September 1896 – 23 May 1940) was an American poet, playwright, novelist and film writer.

O'Neil was born in St. Louis, Missouri, and died in Hollywood, California.

== Works ==
=== Narrative ===
- That Bright Heat (Boni and Liveright, 1928)
- Tomorrow's House; or, The Tiny Angel, illustrated by Rose Cecil O'Neill (E. P. Dutton, 1930) – brother–sister collaboration
- Special Hunger (Liveright, (c)1931) – "A presentation of the life of Keats", OCLC 2274536

=== Filmography ===
- High, Wide, and Handsome
- Intermezzo (1939 film)
- Magnificent Obsession
- Sutter's Gold (1936)
- Yellow Dust (1936)
- Beloved (1934)
- Only Yesterday (1933)
