= Peck's Bad Boy with the Circus =

1938 film by Edward F. Cline

- Directed by: Edward F. Cline
- Written by: George W. Peck (characters); Al Martin (screenplay) & David Boehm (screenplay) & Robert Neville (screenplay and adaptation)
- Produced by: Leonard Fields (associate producer); Sol Lesser (producer)
- Cinematography: Jack MacKenzie
- Edited by: Arthur Hilton
- Music by: Victor Young
- Distributed by: RKO Pictures
- Release date: November 25, 1938
- Running time: 78 minutes
- Country: United States
- Language: English

Peck's Bad Boy with the Circus is a 1938 American comedy film directed by Edward F. Cline, based on the book of the same name by George W. Peck, one of his stories of Peck's Bad Boy.

== Plot summary ==
Bill Peck receives ten dollars from his parents to go to summer camp and defend his trophy; however, he gets forced to spend the money on tickets to a circus that is in town. In revenge he feeds the lions his mom's sleeping pills and ruins Bailey the lion tamer's act. He then goes into the circus camp and falls for bareback rider Fleurette de Cava, who sprains her ankle in rehearsals and will lose her contract if she does not perform in the next show. Bailey has the idea of giving Bill a wig and having him do the show with his guidance, but just before the act begins Bailey finds out who drugged his lions.

== Cast ==
- Tommy Kelly as Bill Peck
- Ann Gillis as Fleurette de Cava
- Edgar Kennedy as Arthur Bailey
- Benita Hume as Myrna Daro
- Billy Gilbert as Bud Boggs
- Grant Mitchell as Henry Peck
- Nana Bryant as Mrs. Henry Peck
- George 'Spanky' McFarland as "Pee Wee"
- Louise Beavers as Cassey
- William Demarest as Daro
- Mickey Rentschler as Herman Boggs
- Fay Helm as Mrs. De Cava
- Harry Stubbs as Hank
- Wade Boteler as Murphy
- Leonard Kibrick as One of Bill’s Friends (uncredited)
- Gwen Gillaspy as Stunt Girl for Ann Gillis (uncredited)
