= The Far Call =

1929 film by Allan Dwan

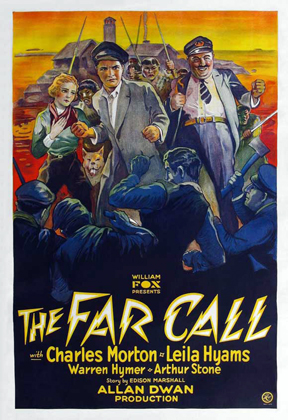
- Theatrical release poster
- Directed by: Allan Dwan
- Written by: Seton I. Miller; Harry H. Caldwell (intertitles)
- Story by: Edison Marshall
- Produced by: William Fox
- Starring: Charles Morton; Leila Hyams
- Cinematography: Harold Rosson
- Edited by: Harry H. Caldwell
- Distributed by: Fox Film Corporation
- Release date: April 28, 1929 (USA)
- Running time: 59 minutes (6 reels)
- Country: United States
- Languages: Sound (Synchronized); English Intertitles

The Far Call is a 1929 American Synchronized sound drama which is currently believed to be a lost film. Although the film had no dialogue, it featured a synchronized Movietone sound track of music and sound effects. The film was directed by Allan Dwan and starring Charles Morton and Leila Hyams. Produced and distributed by the Fox Film Corporation.

== Cast ==
- Charles Morton as Pat Loring
- Leila Hyams as Hilda Larsen
- Warner Baxter
- Arthur Stone as Schmidt
- Warren Hymer as Soup Brophy
- Dan Wolheim as Black O'Neil
- Tiny Sandford as Captain Storkerson (*as Stanley J. Sandford)
- Ullrich Haupt as London Nick
- Charles B. Middleton as Kris Larsen
- Pat Hartigan as Lars Johannson
- Charles Gorman as Haycox
- Ivan Linow as Red Dunkirk
- Harry Gripp as Pete
- Sam Baker as Tubal
- Bernard Siegel as Aleut Chief

== See also ==
- 1937 Fox vault fire
- List of early sound feature films (1926–1929)
