= Double Date (1941 film) =

1941 film

- Theatrical release poster
- Directed by: Glenn Tryon
- Screenplay by: Scott Darling; Erna Lazarus; Agnes Christine Johnston
- Story by: Scott Darling; Erna Lazarus
- Produced by: Joseph Gershenson
- Starring: Edmund Lowe; Una Merkel; Peggy Moran; Rand Brooks; Tommy Kelly; Hattie Noel
- Cinematography: John W. Boyle
- Edited by: Otto Ludwig
- Production company: Universal Pictures
- Distributed by: Universal Pictures
- Release date: March 14, 1941
- Running time: 60 minutes
- Country: United States
- Language: English
- Budget: $88,000

Double Date is a 1941 American comedy film directed by Glenn Tryon and written by Scott Darling, Erna Lazarus and Agnes Christine Johnston. The film stars Edmund Lowe, Una Merkel, Peggy Moran, Rand Brooks, Tommy Kelly and Hattie Noel. The film was released on March 14, 1941, by Universal Pictures.

== Plot ==
The laugh-provoking efforts of a pert, determined young schoolgirl and a swaggering schoolboy-sophisticate to guide their errant adult relatives away from the pitfalls of love.

== Cast ==
- Edmund Lowe as Roger Baldwin
- Una Merkel as Aunt Elsie Kirkland
- Peggy Moran as Penelope 'Penny' Kirkland
- Rand Brooks as Jerry Baldwin
- Tommy Kelly as Hodges
- Hattie Noel as Lilac
- Eddy Waller as Truck Driver
- William Ruhl as Motorcycle Cop
- Sam Flint as Doctor
- Pat O'Malley as Policeman
- Joey Ray as Orchestra Leader
- Charles Smith as Bud
- Nell O'Day as Mary
- Janet Warren as Schoolgirl
- Andrew Tombes as Judge Perkins
- Joe Downing as Burglar
- George Chandler as Attendant
- Frank Sully as Hank
