= Tommy Kelly (actor) =

American actor

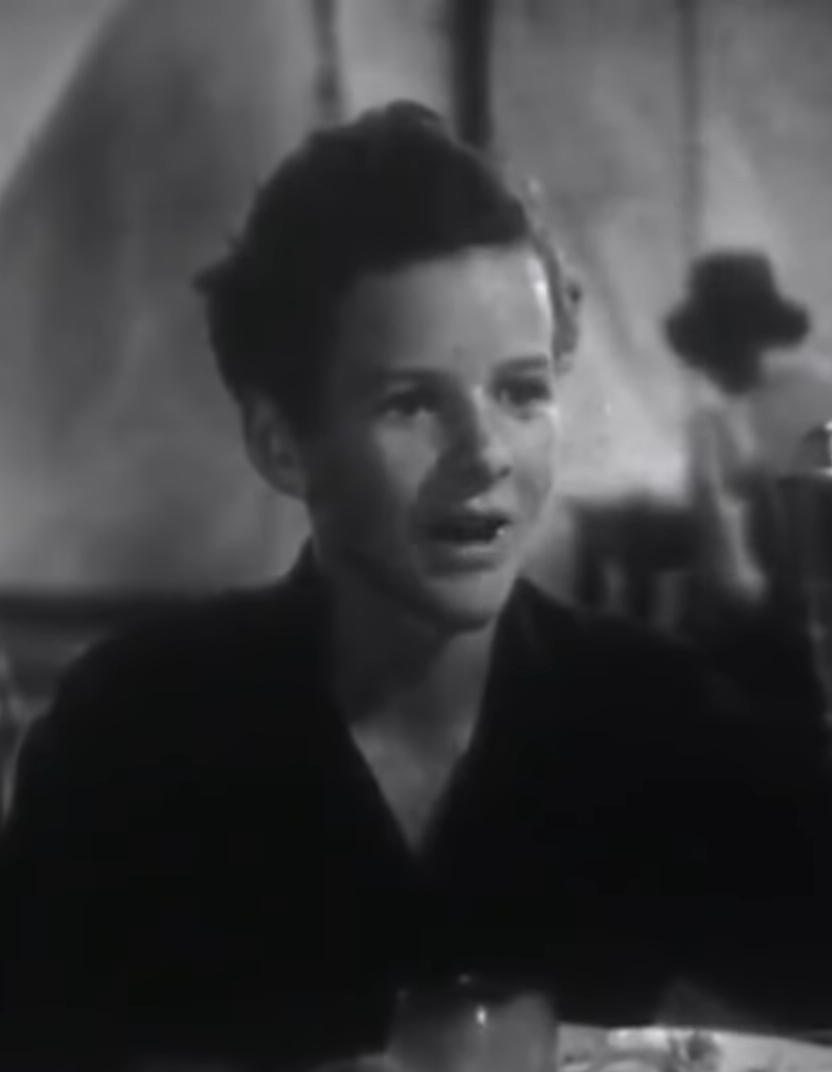
- Tommy Kelly in Peck's Bad Boy with the Circus (1938)
- Born: Thomas Francis Kelly; April 6, 1925; New York City, U.S.
- Died: January 26, 2016 (aged 90); Greensboro, North Carolina, U.S.
- Occupation: Film actor
- Years active: 1938–1950

Thomas Francis Kelly (April 6, 1925 – January 26, 2016), professionally known as Tommy Kelly, was an American child actor. He played the title role in The Adventures of Tom Sawyer in 1938 based on Mark Twain's novel of the same name.

== Early life and career ==
Kelly was born in the Bronx, the son of Nora and Michael Kelly, a fireman, in humble circumstances. He had twelve siblings. Kelly's grandparents, all four, were from Ireland. He began his acting career at the age of twelve when he was selected to play Tom Sawyer in the 1938 movie The Adventures of Tom Sawyer, the first Technicolor adaption of Mark Twain's classic 1876 novel. Approximately 25,000 boys had auditioned for that role and it is said that famous producer David O. Selznick handpicked Kelly for the role. Despite Kelly's earning good critical reviews for his performance, the film was only a poor financial success. He also played the lead role in Peck's Bad Boy with the Circus later that year as Bill Peck.

In 1939, Tommy Kelly had a small but memorable part in Gone with the Wind as the boy crying in a band playing "Dixie" in Atlanta while the death lists are given out. He played the notable supporting role of Willie in Archie Mayo's musical film They Shall Have Music (1939) followed by a leading role as a young cadet in the B movie Military Academy (1940). As he reached adulthood, Kelly's roles in movies were minor and he was often uncredited. He appeared in The Magnificent Yankee in 1950, which turned out to be his last of 19 films before ending his acting career.

As with many other stars, the war years found Tommy in the U.S. Army; he served in the infantry rather than the USO, as did some other child stars.

== Personal life and death ==
After his Hollywood days, Tommy Kelly earned a PhD from Michigan State. He worked as a high school teacher and counselor in Culver City and later as an administrator in the Orange County, Florida school system. He worked in Liberia as an administrator for the Peace Corps towards the end of the 1960s. He afterwards served as superintendent of international schools in Liberia and Venezuela. He eventually returned to the United States and worked in an important position at the U.S. Department of Agriculture in Washington. Ever conscious of the value of education, in his thesis he focused, among other things, on the relative advantages of children who were educated in U.S. military dependent schools abroad. "Dr. Kelly" served as an International Relations Advisor in the International Organization Affairs (IOA) unit of the Office of International Cooperation and Development (OICD) of the U.S. Department of Agriculture, where he prepared positions for the Office of the Secretary of Agriculture, with personal responsibility for OECD, and United States delegations to the governing boards of United Nations Organizations concerned with Food and Agriculture, a position he held until his retirement from federal service.

Kelly was generally reticent about his years as an actor after retiring from Hollywood at the age of 25. He married Sue Kelly in 1948; they were married for 67 years, until his death. Kelly died on January 26, 2016, in Greensboro, North Carolina, at age 90 from congestive heart failure. He was survived by his wife, six children, twelve grandchildren and two great-grandchildren.

== Filmography ==
=== Film ===
Year	Title	Role	Notes	ref
1938	The Adventures of Tom Sawyer	Tom Sawyer	Directed by Norman Taurog.; Screenplay by John V. A. Weaver.; Based on the classic 1876 novel by Mark Twain.	
1938	Peck's Bad Boy with the Circus	Bill Peck	American comedy film directed by Edward F. Cline.; Based on the book of the same name by George W. Peck.	
1939	They Shall Have Music	Willie	Musical film directed by Archie Mayo.	
1939	Gone with the Wind	Boy in band	American epic-historical romance film adapted from Margaret Mitchell's 1936 novel of the same name.; Directed by Victor Fleming.; Screenplay by Sidney Howard	
1940	Curtain Call	Fred "Freddy" Middleton	Comedy film directed by Frank Woodruff.	
1940	Irene	Michael	American musical film produced and directed by Herbert Wilcox.; Screenplay by Alice Duer Miller is based on the book of the 1919 stage musical of the same name by James Montgomery, who had adapted it from his play Irene O'Dare.	
1940	Military Academy	Tommy Lewis	American drama film directed by D. Ross Lederman.; Screenplay by Karl Brown and David Silverstein from a story by Richard English.	
1940	Gallant Sons	Harwood "Woody" Hollister	American mystery film directed by George B. Seitz.; Screenplay by William R. Lipman and Marion Parsonnet.	
1941	Nice Girl?	Ken Atkins	American musical film directed by William A. Seiter.	
1941	Double Date	Hodges	Directed by Glenn Tryon.; Screenplay by Scott Darling (Credited as W. Scott Darling), Erna Lazarus, and Agnes Christine Johnston.	
1941	Life Begins for Andy Hardy	Chuck Curss	American family comedy film directed by George B. Seitz.; Screenplay by Agnes Christine Johnston and Aurania Rouverol.; The 11th installment of the 16 popular Andy Hardy films.; The last Andy Hardy film to feature Judy Garland.	
1942	Mug Town	Steve	Directed by Ray Taylor.	
1947	The Beginning or the End	Mack	American docudrama film directed by Norman Taurog.; The film dramatizes the creation of the atomic bomb in the Manhattan Project and the bombing of Hiroshima.	
1947	The Fabulous Texan	Lee Kilrain	American western film directed by Edward Ludwig.; Screenplay by Lawrence Hazard and Horace McCoy.	
1948	He Walked by Night	Young hoodlum aka Redhead	Police procedural film noir directed by Alfred L. Werker and Anthony Mann.; Shot in semidocumentary tone, was loosely based on newspaper accounts of the real-life actions of Erwin "Machine-Gun" Walker, a former Glendale, California police department employee and World War II veteran who unleashed a crime spree of burglaries, robberies, and shootouts in the Los Angeles area during 1945 and 1946.	
1949	Adventure in Baltimore	Student	Drama directed by Richard Wallace.	
1949	Battleground	Casualty	American war film that follows a company in the 327th Glider Infantry Regiment, 101st Airborne Division as they cope with the Siege of Bastogne during the Battle of the Bulge in World War II.	
1950	The West Point Story	Cadet	Also known as Fine and Dandy.; Musical comedy film directed by Roy Del Ruth.	
1950	The Magnificent Yankee	Secretary	American biographical film adapted by Emmet Lavery from his play of the same title, which was in turn adapted from the book Mr. Justice Holmes by Francis Biddle.	
