= Wonder of Women =

1929 film

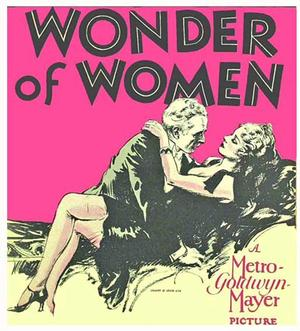
- Directed by: Clarence Brown
- Written by: Marian Ainslee (titles); Bess Meredyth (Writer); Hermann Sudermann (Novel)
- Starring: Lewis Stone; Leila Hyams; Peggy Wood
- Cinematography: Merritt B. Gerstad
- Edited by: William LeVanway
- Distributed by: Metro-Goldwyn-Mayer
- Release date: July 13, 1929
- Running time: 95 minutes
- Country: United States
- Languages: Sound (Part-Talkie); English Intertitles

Wonder of Women is a 1929 American sound part-talkie pre-Code drama film directed by Clarence Brown and starring Lewis Stone, Leila Hyams, and Peggy Wood. While the film has a few talking sequences, the majority of the film features a synchronized musical score with sound effects using both the sound-on-disc and sound-on-film process. It was nominated for Best Writing at the 2nd Academy Awards.

Based on the 1927 German novel Die Frau des Steffen Tromholt by Hermann Sudermann, the film is now lost with only sound discs surviving at UCLA.

== Cast ==
- Lewis Stone as Stephen Trombolt
- Leila Hyams as Karen
- Peggy Wood as Brigitte
- Harry Myers as Bruno Heim
- Sarah Padden as Anna
- George Fawcett as Doctor
- Blanche Friderici as Stephen Trombolt's housekeeper (as Blanche Frederici)
- Wally Albright as Wulle-Wulle (as Wally Albright Jr.)
- Anita Louise as Lottie (as Anita Fremault)
- Ullrich Haupt as Kurt

== Music ==
The film contains two theme songs. The first is entitled "At Close Of Day" with words and music by Fred Fisher and Martin Broones. The second theme song is entitled "Ich Liebe Dich (I Love You)" with words and music by Raymond Klages, Jesse Greer and Martin Broones.

== See also ==
- List of rediscovered films
- List of early sound feature films (1926–1929)
