= Military Academy (film) =

1940 film by D. Ross Lederman

- Directed by: D. Ross Lederman
- Written by: Karl Brown
- Starring: Tommy Kelly
- Cinematography: Allen G. Siegler
- Edited by: Gene Milford
- Distributed by: Columbia Pictures
- Release date: August 6, 1940
- Running time: 66 minutes
- Country: United States
- Language: English

Military Academy is an American drama film directed by D. Ross Lederman, scripted by Karl Brown and David Silverstein from a story by Richard English and released as a low-budget programmer by Columbia Pictures on August 6, 1940. It is one of numerous military-school or patriotic-adventure-themed, quickly-produced second features for a primarily juvenile audience, which every studio rushed before the cameras following the September 1939 outbreak of war in Europe and, subsequently, the Selective Training and Service Act of 1940, passed by Congress on September 14 and signed by President Franklin Roosevelt on September 16.

== Plot ==
Tommy Kelly is a fifteen-year-old sent to the Military Academy under an assumed surname. His father, a well-known crime figure, although now reformed, has made the family name so notorious that his relatives find it difficult to relate to society at large once the truth becomes known. At the school he makes friends with two other misfits, a cocky champion athlete and an overprotected son of a wealthy family who cannot adjust himself to the strict regimen. A senior cadet immediately becomes the nemesis of the three younger boys.

Kelly's family name is exposed and he faces ostracism from fellow cadets, except for his two friends who continue to support him. Ultimately, however, all the boys prove themselves to be fine, upstanding, patriotic young Americans on the eve of World War II.

== Cast ==
- Tommy Kelly as Tommy Lewis
- Bobby Jordan as Dick Hill
- David Holt as Sandy Blake
- Jackie Searl as Prentiss Dover
- Don Beddoe as Marty Lewis
- Jimmy Butler as Cadet Dewey
- Walter Tetley as Cadet Blackburn
- Earle Foxe as Maj. Dover
- Eddie Dew as Capt. Kendall
- Warren Ashe as Capt. Banning
- Joan Leslie as Marjorie Blake (as Joan Brodel)
