= Jeffrey O'Kelly =

Irish actor and writer

- Born: April 22, 1953 (age 71); Doire, Ireland
- Occupation(s): Film and television producer

Jeffrey O'Kelly is an Irish actor and writer. He is the creator of the animated television series Doctor Snuggles.

Jeffrey O'Kelly was born in Doire, Ireland.

In 2011, O'Kelly was reported to be working on Blarneyland, a live action film with SFX leprechauns and faeries.

== Selected works ==
- The Thin Red Line (actor)
- Doctor Snuggles (1979) (creator)
- Tusk (1980) (writer)
- The Story of O 2 (1984) (writer)
