= Phil Berg (talent agent) =

Co-founder of the Belg-Allenberg talent agency

- Born: Phillip Jay Berg; February 15, 1902; New York City, U.S.
- Died: February 1, 1983 (age 80)
- Education: B.A. University of Pennsylvania
- Known for: co-founding the Berg-Allenberg talent agency.
- Spouses: Leila Hyams (m. 1927; died 1977); Joan Hartley

Philip Jay Berg (February 15, 1902 – February 1, 1983) was an American talent agent who co-founded, with Bert Allenberg, the Berg-Allenberg talent agency. He was known for his movie-package deals, a concept that changed Hollywood in the 1930s. He represented an empire of dozens of actors, directors, and writers.

== Biography ==
Berg was born in New York City on February 15, 1902. He was of Jewish descent. He graduated from the University of Pennsylvania. In 1924, he moved to Los Angeles where he worked as a talent agent, becoming a millionaire by the age of 26. In 1927, he partnered with Bert Allenberg to form the Berg-Allenberg talent agency. Berg created the concept of the "package deal" where he would find a script, a writer, actors, and a director; and then sell the entire package to a producer. He represented such stars as Clark Gable, Judy Garland, Joan Crawford, Lucille Ball, Wallace Beery, Walter Brennan, Olivia de Havilland, Joan Fontaine, Melvyn Douglas, Walter Huston, Buster Keaton, Alan Ladd, Charles Laughton, and Edward G. Robinson; directors Frank Capra, Victor Fleming, Vincente Minnelli, Jean Renoir, and William Wellman; and writers Michael Arlen, James Hilton, Dalton Trumbo, and Rodgers and Hart. He served in the U.S. Navy during World War II. He retired in 1947 to pursue his passion in archaeology. In December 1949, the Berg-Allenberg Agency was acquired by the William Morris Agency.

== Personal life ==
In 1927, he married actress Leila Hyams who predeceased him. He remarried to Joan Hartley. At age 80 in 1983, he died from heart failure, leaving his artifacts and fine-art collection (valued at $1.5 million in 1969) to the Los Angeles County Museum of Art.
