= Mr Faint-Heart =

1931 play

- Written by: Ian Hay
- Original language: English
- Genre: Comedy

Premiere
- Date premiered: 1931

Mr Faint-Heart is a 1931 comedy play by the British writer Ian Hay. It was staged at the Shaftesbury Theatre in London's West End between 20 April and 20 June 1931.

In 1935 it was adapted into a film All at Sea directed by Anthony Kimmins and starring Tyrell Davis, Googie Withers and Rex Harrison.

A mild-mannered man inherits some money and goes on a cruise around the Mediterranean. To impress a lady on board, he pretends to be a famous writer, but this soon gets him into complications.

== Bibliography ==
- Goble, Alan. The Complete Index to Literary Sources in Film. Walter de Gruyter, 1999.
- Wearing, J.P. The London Stage 1930-1939: A Calendar of Productions, Performers, and Personnel. Rowman & Littlefield, 2014.
