= Teresa Maxwell-Conover =

American actress (1884–1968)

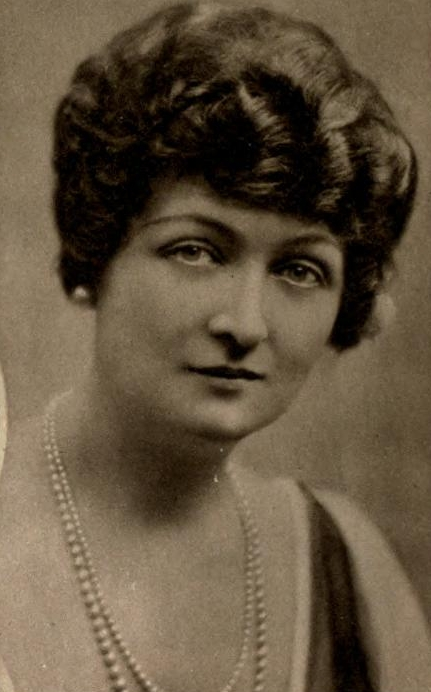
- Maxwell-Conover in 1921
- Born: September 26, 1884; Louisville, Kentucky, U.S.
- Died: September 1968 (aged 83–84); Levittown, New York, U.S.
- Occupation: Actress

Teresa Maxwell-Conover (born Teresa Ryan; September 26, 1884 – September 1968) was an American actress in Broadway productions in the early 20th century. She was in motion pictures until the early 1940s, and was sometimes credited as Theresa Maxwell Conover. She was from Louisville, Kentucky.

== Early years ==
Born and raised in Louisville, Kentucky, Maxwell-Conover was the daughter of Reverend Dan Ryan, an Episcopal or Methodist minister. She had a brother, Dolph Ryan.

When she was a child, Maxwell-Conover desire to be an actress was so strong that she performed on a stump to an audience of chickens and ducks on her uncle's property.

== Stage career ==
With no acting experience, Maxwell-Conover went to New York seeking to become an actress. A personal visit with the author and manager of The Purple Lady, which was then being presented, led to her portraying Peggy Proudfoot in that play a few weeks later.

Maxwell-Conover was the leading lady in a stage production of The Purple Lady in New Orleans in 1899. She acted in Nashville, Tennessee, beginning in 1900 and continued there at least through 1902.

Maxwell-Conover's New York City debut came at the New Theatre in the four-act play, Nobody's Daughter, in February 1911. As "Mrs. Frampton" she was complimented by a reviewer in The New York Times for having rendered "a beautiful performance." He described her as "an actress of unusual distinction in appearance and manner, dresses exquisitely, and plays with great naturalness and simplicity a role somewhat indefinitely outlined by the dramatist."

She was in the company of Gertrude Elliott in the Charles Frohman produced comedy, Preserving Mr. Panmure, in February 1912. Written by Sir Arthur Wing Pinero, the play was presented to audiences at the Lyceum Theatre. Previously it enjoyed an extended run at the Comedy Theatre in London, England.

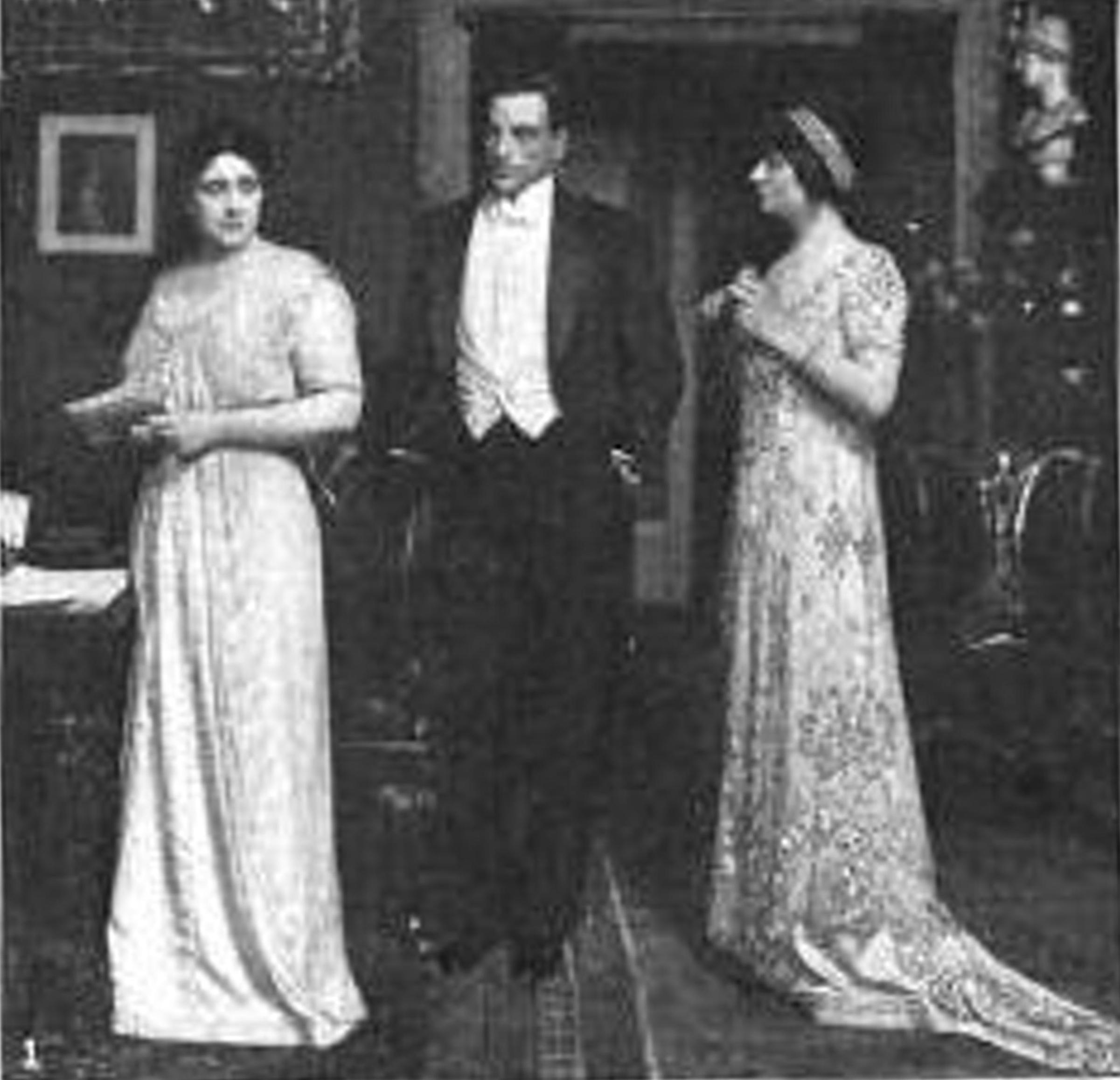
Gladys Hanson, Milton Sills and Teresa Maxwell-Conover in The Governor's Lady

In September 1912 she was in the first David Belasco production in New York City. The Governor's Lady was staged by the Republic Theatre. Also in the Belasco company were Emma Dunn and Emmitt Corrigan. Written by Alice Bradley, it had a very intense and emotional third act. The stage's impression of reality was heightened by a fine reproduction of a Childs Restaurant. (Note: Childs Restaurants was a business chain in New York City. In 1912 there was a Child's at 8th Street and Broadway. The New York Times December 17, 1912. Page 23.) The troupe traveled to the National Theatre in January 1913.

To-Day, a three-act play given at the 48th Street Theatre in October 1913, concentrates on the "worship of money" in the United States. Maxwell-Conover, as "Mrs Garland", and Emily Stevens, are applauded by a reviewer for their acting. The same observer thought the production was an "indecent, vicious play", particularly because of its "utterly malicious insinuations".

On December 15, 1913, Maxwell-Conover was at the Lyceum in The Cassillis Engagement with Alison Skipworth in the cast of players. This was a four-act comedy by St. John Hankin.

The Maxine Elliott Theatre hosted a comedy by Salisbury Field entitled The Rented Earl in February 1915. Lawrence D'Orsay, Maxwell-Conover, and Evelyn Carter were among the actors in a show which was presented twice daily except for Sunday. The farce tells about a group of social climbers who try to persuade an English nobleman to assist them in their activities. In April 1915 Conover-Maxwell was in a production of The Natural Law by Charles Sumner at the Republic Theatre, at 209 West 42nd Street, in midtown Manhattan. The play changed venues in September 1915. It moved to the York Theatre at 116th Street near Lenox Avenue. John Cort had recently added the York to his chain of playhouses which offered Broadway attractions to audiences at "popular" prices. Conrad Nagel was in the cast when the play came to the Loew's Lexington Theatre, 571 Lexington Avenue in October.

Emily Stevens was the leading lady in a Broadhurst Theatre production of The Madonna of the Future, which premiered in late January 1918. Maxwell-Conover acted the part of "Mrs. Van Duzen". Near the final curtain of the three-act comedy Maxwell-Conover spoke to Stevens, saying "You are so charming: you mean something! I don't in the least know what you mean, but that is what makes you charming." During the first two acts Stevens' character resolves to bear a child without being married. She announces this to her neighbors in Tarrytown, New York. The audience was shocked by the frankness of the language employed by the characters. Written by playwright Alan Dale, the dialogue "was brilliant". Her neighbors are further startled when Stevens delivers her baby, which comes to light in the comedy's second portion. In the third act she discovers that she loves the child's father and would rather marry him than see him wed someone else.

A critic was complimentary of the play's two sets which were representative of what was then a new art of "residential decoration" being employed on Broadway. The entire cast proved skilled in speaking their lines. The reviewer's overall impression was positive. He wrote that the production reminded him of the finest he had witnessed at the Morosco Theatre.

In Madonna of the Future Maxwell-Conover wore a frock of brown satin and lace. The skirt was draped low in zouave effect. The front panel was composed of brown mesh lace threaded in gold. The bodice was made of lace in back and satin in front. The waistline featured brown ribbon velvet. The costume was completed by a string of brown wooden beads and a flat sailor hat.

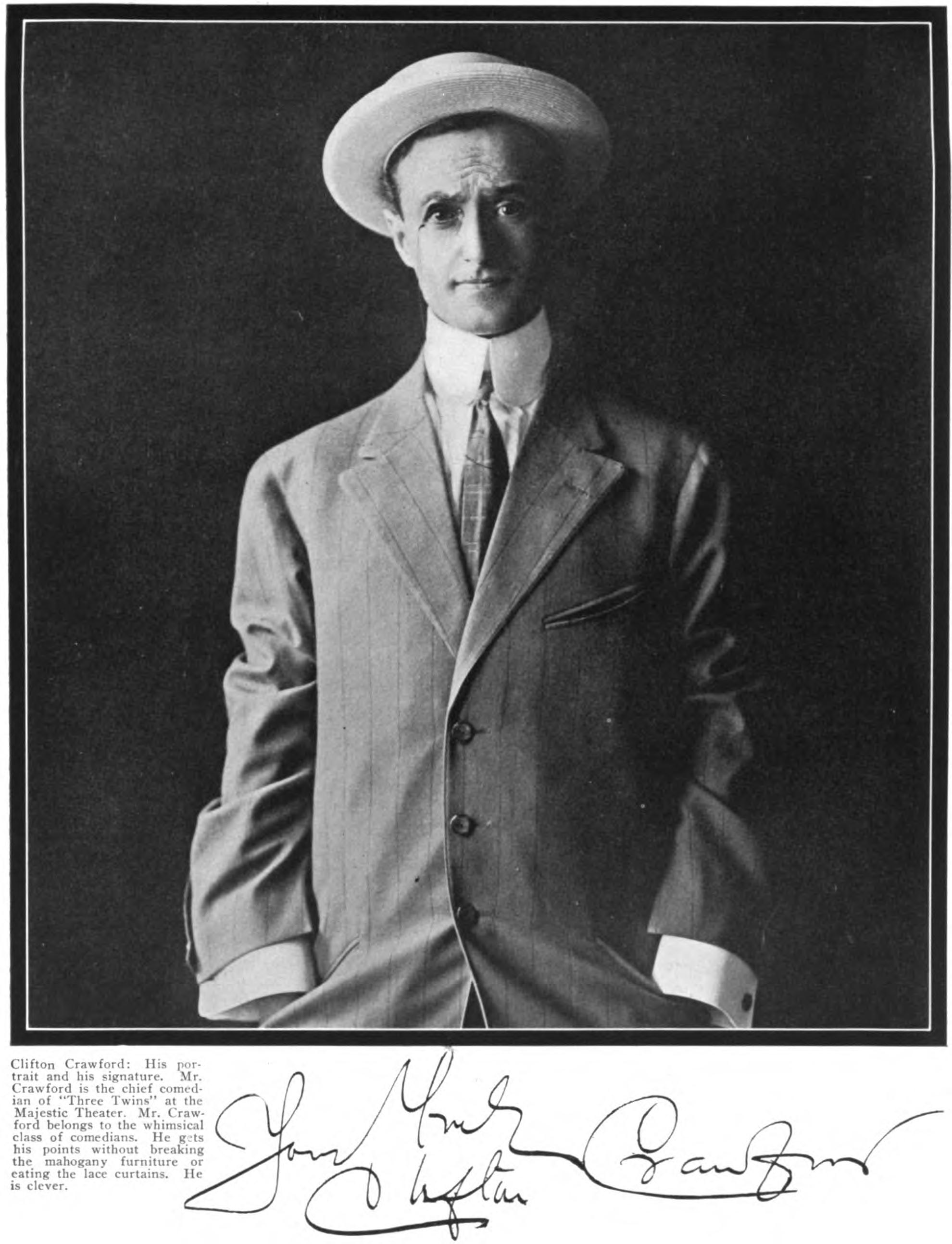
Clifton Crawford 1909

She was in plays which toured various cities by 1919. One of these was My Lady Friends (1919) with comedian Clifton Crawford. Maxwell-Conover starred with William Hodge in Fixing Sister in Fitchburg, Massachusetts in December 1926. She continued to play in theatrical productions after her motion picture career hit full stride in the 1920s. In 1928 she acted the role of the mother in Your Uncle Dudley while playing in a society comedy called The Last of Mrs. Cheney.

== Films ==
Maxwell-Conover debuted as a film actress as "Mrs. Layton du Roc" in Just Sylvia (1918). She supported Elaine Hammerstein in The Daughter Pays (1920). Hammerstein played a woman who strives to maintain her family's finances despite having a mother who squanders money. Constance Talmadge was showcased in Polly of the Follies (1922). Maxwell-Conover is cast as a Long Island society woman in the First National Pictures comedy.

Brief Moment (1933) is a Carole Lombard and Gene Raymond movie based on a play. It was released by Columbia Pictures. Maxwell-Conover is a supporting actress who plays the part of "Mrs. Deane". She played Mrs. Archer in the 1934 film The Age of Innocence.

Her later film appearances include Gallant Lady (1934), The Mighty Barnum (1934), Mississippi (1935), and Free and Easy (1941). Maxwell-Conover had uncredited parts in several other movies.

== Personal ==
She was married to Wall Street broker John Thompson Conover III.

She enjoyed outdoor sports and activities, especially horseback riding.

== Filmography ==
Year	Film	Role	Director	Notes
1918	Just Sylvia			
1920	The Daughter Pays		Robert Ellis	
1922	Polly of the Follies		John Emerson	Lost film
1922	The Light in the Dark		Clarence Brown	
1922	When Knighthood Was in Flower		Robert G. Vignola	
1924	Yolanda		Robert G. Vignola	
1925	I Want My Man		Lambert Hillyer	Lost film
1927	The Lunatic at Large		Fred C. Newmeyer	Lost film
1930	Queen High		Fred C. Newmeyer	
1932	The All American		Russell Mack	
1932	The Kid from Spain		Leo McCarey	
1932	Men of America		Ralph Ince	
1932	Silver Dollar		Alfred E. Green	
1933	Brief Moment		David Burton	
1934	Gallant Lady		Gregory La Cava	
1934	Half a Sinner		Kurt Neumann	
1934	Chained		Clarence Brown	
1934	The Age of Innocence		Philip Moeller	
1934	The Mighty Barnum		Walter Lang	
1935	Night Life of the Gods		Lowell Sherman	
1935	Mississippi		A. Edward Sutherland	
1935	Reckless		Victor Fleming	
1935	Peter Ibbetson		Henry Hathaway	
1936	Rainbow on the River		George Sherman	
1937	Two Wise Maids		Phil Rosen	
1941	Free and Easy		George Sidney; Edward Buzzell (uncredited)	

== Sources ==
- "Amusements". Daily Kennebec County, Maine Journal. July 24, 1928. p. 12.
- "My Lady Friends Pleases Large Audience". Dunkirk, New York Evening Observer. November 12, 1919. p. 1.
- "The Movies". Dunkirk Evening Observer. June 20, 1921. p. 12.
- "Chatter of the Stage Stars and Screen". Fitchburg Sentinel. December 4, 1926. p. 5.
- "Nobody's Daughter At The New Theatre". The New York Times. February 14, 1911. p. 8.
- "New Plays That Bid For Favor". The New York Times. February 25, 1912. p. X9.
- "David Belasco's Plans". The New York Times. August 22, 1912. p. 9.
- "To-Day Is Vicious By Intent And Aim". The New York Times. October 7, 1913. p. 13.
- "No Title". The New York Times. December 7, 1913. p. C11.
- "No Title". The New York Times. January 31, 1915. p. X8.
- "The Impresario And The Alligator". The New York Times. February 7, 1915. p. X4.
- "Second Thoughts On First Nights". The New York Times. April 18, 1915. p. X6.
- "The Week In The Theatres". The New York Times. September 7, 1915. p. 13.
- "Emily Stevens As Cubistic Madonna". The New York Times. January 29, 1918. p. 13..
- "Stage Costumes Reflect Spring Styles". Ogden, Utah Standard. March 23, 1918. p. 23.
- "Women Getting Too Far From Home Life". Syracuse Herald. May 11, 1919. p. 66.
- "Coming To The Theaters". The Washington Post. January 12, 1913. p. 31.
