= To-Day =

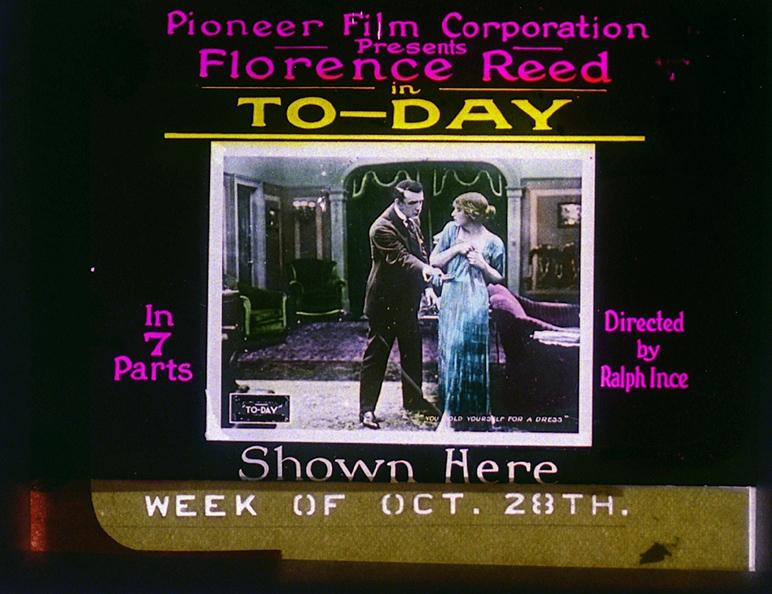
- Lantern slide
- Directed by: Ralph Ince
- Written by: Ralph Ince (scenario)
- Based on: play by George Broadhurst and Abraham S. Schomer
- Produced by: Harry Rapf; Pathé Exchange
- Starring: Florence Reed
- Cinematography: Andre Barlatier - (French Wikipedia)
- Distributed by: Pioneer Film Corporation
- Release date: June 1917
- Running time: 5 reels
- Country: United States
- Language: Silent (English intertitles)

To-Day is a 1917 American silent drama film directed by Ralph Ince, who is also credited as the film's writer, and starring Florence Reed. A story about prostitution, this film is based on a 1913 stage play Today by George Broadhurst and Abraham S. Schomer and starred Emily Stevens which ran for an astounding 280 performances in eight months' time. Actors Gus Weinburg and Alice Gale are the only actors in the film that appeared in the play. It is considered to be a lost film.

It was remade as the early sound picture Today (1930) by Majestic Pictures starring Conrad Nagel and Catherine Dale Owen.

== Cast ==
- Florence Reed - Lily Morton
- Frank Mills - Fred Morton (*this Frank R. Mills 1867/?1870-1921)
- Gus Weinberg - Henry Morton
- Alice Gale - Emma Morton
- Leonore Harris - Marion Garland (billed as Lenore Harris)
- Harry Lambart - Richard Hewlett (billed as Captain Harry Lambert)
- Kate Lester - Mrs. Farington

== Reception ==
Like many American films of the time, To-Day was subject to cuts by city and state film censorship boards. The Chicago Board of Censors refused to issue a permit as the film features the downfall of a woman through her infidelity and leading an immoral life.
