= His Glorious Night =

1929 film

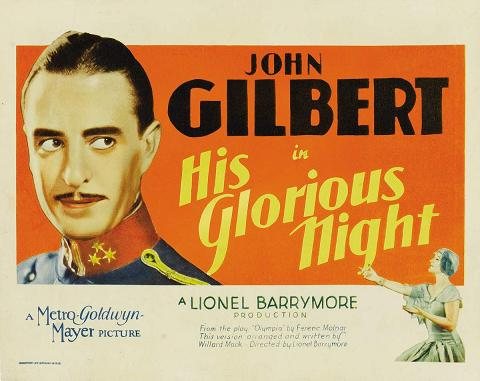
- Lobby card
- Directed by: Lionel Barrymore
- Written by: Willard Mack
- Based on: Olympia; 1928 play by Ferenc Molnár
- Produced by: Irving Thalberg (uncredited)
- Starring: John Gilbert; Catherine Dale Owen
- Cinematography: Percy Hilburn (*French)
- Edited by: William LeVanway
- Music by: Lionel Barrymore
- Distributed by: Metro-Goldwyn-Mayer
- Release date: September 28, 1929
- Running time: 80 minutes
- Country: United States
- Language: English

His Glorious Night is a 1929 American pre-Code romance film directed by Lionel Barrymore and starring John Gilbert in his first released talkie. The film is based on the 1928 play Olympia by Ferenc Molnár.

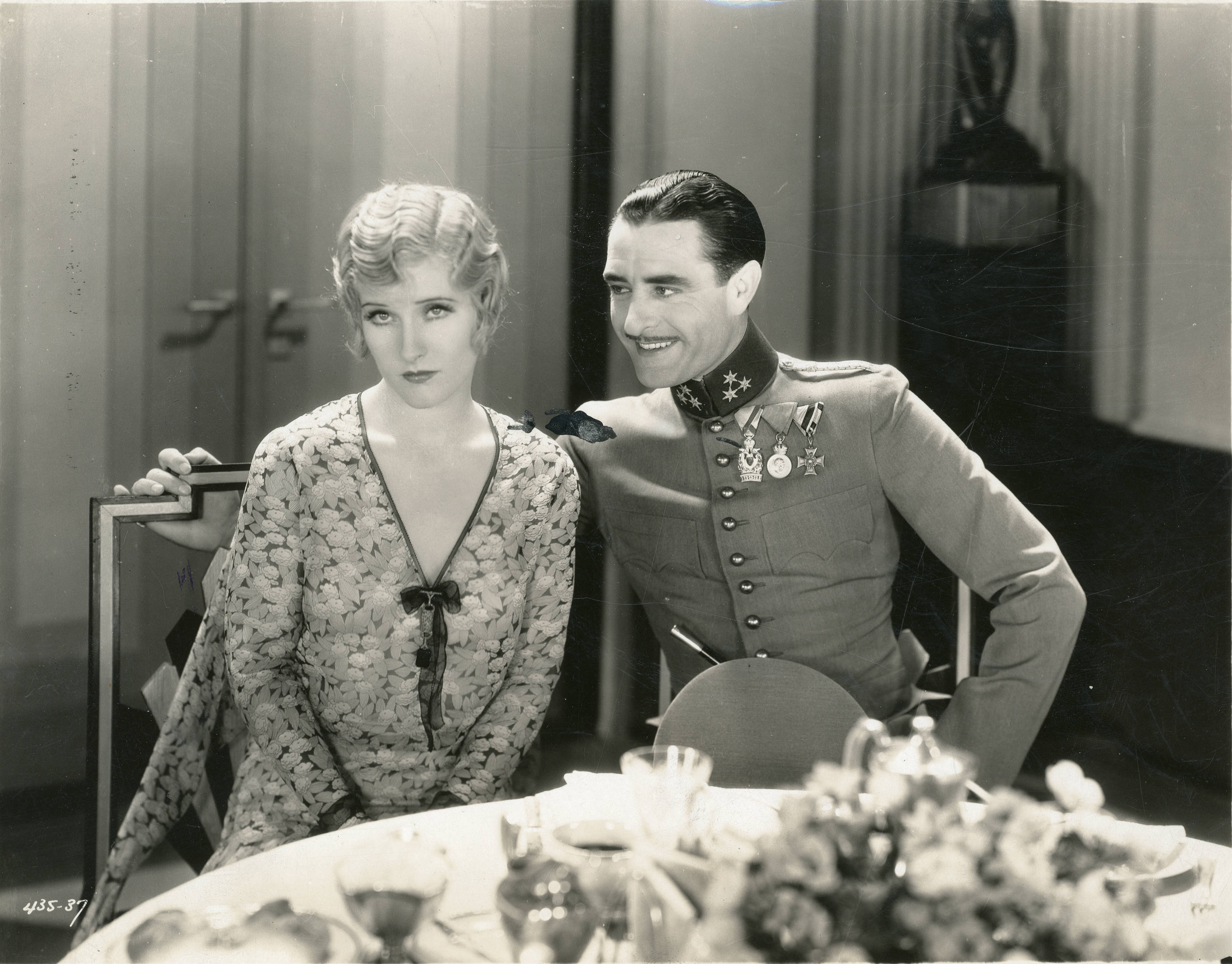
Scene from His Glorious Night

His Glorious Night has gained notoriety as the film that began the aging Gilbert's rapid career decline by revealing that he had a voice unsuitable for sound.

== Plot ==
Although being engaged against her will with a wealthy man, Princess Orsolini is in love with Captain Kovacs, a cavalry officer she is secretly meeting. Her mother Eugenie, who has found out about the affair forces her to dump Kovacs and take part in the arranged marriage. Though not believing her own words, Orsolini reluctantly tells Kovacs she cannot ever fall in love with a man with his social position, being the son of a peasant.

Feeling deeply hurt, Kovacs decides to take revenge by indulging in blackmail, spreading a rumor that he is an impostor and a swindler. The queen fears a scandal and invites herself over to his apartment to retrieve any proof of Orsolini and Kovacs' affair, including love letters. In the end, Kovacs agrees on remaining quiet by having Orsolini spend the night with him. True love is finally reconciled.

== Cast ==
- John Gilbert as Captain Andras Kovacs
- Catherine Dale Owen as Princess Orsolini
- Nance O'Neil as Eugenie
- Gustav von Seyffertitz as Krehl
- Hedda Hopper as Mrs. Collingswood Stratton
- Doris Hill as Priscilla Stratton
- Tyrell Davis as Prince Luigi Caprilli
- Gerald Barry as Lord York
- Madeline Seymour as Lady York
- Richard Carle as Count Albert
- Eva Dennison as Countess Lina
- Youcca Troubetzkov as Von Bergman
- Peter Gawthorne as General Ettingen

== Production ==
Although His Glorious Night was John Gilbert's first sound film to be released, it was not his first "talkie". His earlier sound film, Redemption, was "'temporarily shelved'" by MGM and not released until early April 1930, six months after the premiere of His Glorious Night.

== Reception and Gilbert's voice ==
The suggestion that Gilbert's vocal performance was so dreadful that it prompted laughter in the audience has long been held as an article of faith in the film world. That tale is thought to have inspired the fictitious film The Duelling Cavalier, which is featured as a central plot element in the 1952 MGM musical comedy Singin' in the Rain. In fact, while reviews of His Glorious Night ranged in 1929 from tepid to cautiously supportive, Gilbert himself received generally good notices and his voice was judged perfectly adequate, if somewhat studied in tone. "John Gilbert Makes a Big Hit in First Talkie", announces the review headline in the Chicago Daily Tribune on October 21. "Mr. Gilbert is a bit sound-conscious and over-ardent in the first few scenes", reports the newspaper, "but he whips himself into shape almost immediately and is oo lala as usual for the remainder of the picture." The Tribune then assures Gilbert's fans, "His voice is guaranteed to charm all listeners." In his assessment of Gilbert's performance, Edwin Schallert of the Los Angeles Times focused too on the actor's style of delivery and found no particular faults with the overall quality of his voice. "Gilbert", writes Schallert, "has not yet hit quite the perfect note on intonation for the microphone, but, barring a certain over-resonant delivery of lines, his enunciation is crisp and fine."

Mordaunt Hall, the influential critic for The New York Times, also generally approved of both the star's voice and performance:

Mr. Gilbert's responsibility does not lie with his lines and therefore he is to be congratulated on the manner in which he handles this speaking rôle. His voice is pleasant, but not one which is rich in nuances. His performance is good, but it would benefit by the suggestion of a little more wit.

However, in the same October 5, 1929 review, Hall singles out the film's main flaws, namely its creaky storyline, repetitive dialogue, and old-fashioned approach to the material:

It is quite evident that the producers intend to keep Mr. Gilbert, even now that he talks in his amorous scenes, before the public as the great screen lover, for in this current narrative this actor constantly repeats "I love you" to the Princess Orsolini as he kisses her. In fact, his many protestations of affection while embracing the charming girl, who is incidentally impersonated by Miss Owen, caused a large female contingent in the theatre yesterday afternoon to giggle and laugh.

This approach to love scenes, far more in line with the technique of silent cinema than sound, was criticised in many reviews. One critic even stated, "Gilbert will be able to change places with Harry Langdon. His prowess at lovemaking, which has held the stenos breathless, takes on a comedy aspect, that gets the gum chewers tittering at first, then laughing outright at the very false ring of the couple of dozen 'I love you' phrases." Such reactions were attributed not to Gilbert's voice but specifically to Willard Mack's "overly florid dialogue, which might have been fine as subtitles but sounded downright embarrassing to audiences when spoken by a cast suffering from the stilted direction of a microphone-conscious Lionel Barrymore".

== Rumors of sabotage ==
Some, including Gilbert's own daughter Leatrice Gilbert Fountain, have blamed MGM studio chief Louis B. Mayer for deliberately perpetuating a rumor that Gilbert's voice was unsuitable for sound in order to drive out a star whom he judged to be too expensive, too cocky, and approaching his use-by date. Mayer and Gilbert undoubtedly shared a strong enmity, and according to rumors, Mayer knew that the script was substandard, and deliberately hired an out-of-condition Lionel Barrymore as the director.

As was common at the time, foreign-language versions of a film were not made by dubbing; instead, scenes were reshot either with the original actors reading translations of their lines phonetically or by using other actors fluent in a specific language. In 1930, the French remake Si l'empereur savait ça, Spanish remake Olimpia and German remake Olympia were released. All versions received notably better reviews.

MGM sold the film's rights to Paramount Pictures. A different film version, based on the original play rather than the 1929 movie, was produced as A Breath of Scandal in 1960.

The film was broadcast on Turner Classic Movies on November 13, 2025, marking the first time that any substantial number of people could watch it since its release in 1929.

== See also ==
- Lionel Barrymore filmography
- List of early sound feature films (1926–1929)
