= Redemption (1930 film) =

1930 film

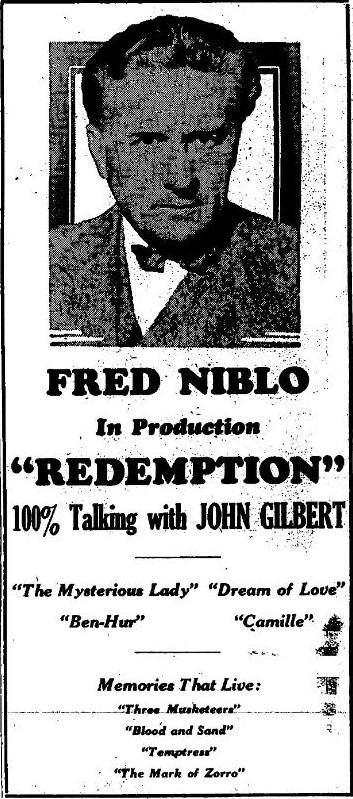
- Advertisement noting film was in production
- Directed by: Fred Niblo; Lionel Barrymore (retakes)
- Written by: Arthur Hopkins (play Redemption); Edwin Justus Mayer (dialogue); Dorothy Farnum (script)
- Based on: The Living Corpse; 1911 play by Leo Tolstoy
- Produced by: Louis B. Mayer; Irving Thalberg; Arthur Hopkins
- Starring: John Gilbert
- Cinematography: Percy Hilburn
- Edited by: Margaret Booth
- Music by: William Axt; Ferde Grofe (uncredited)
- Distributed by: Metro-Goldwyn-Mayer
- Release date: April 5, 1930
- Running time: 65 minutes
- Country: United States
- Language: English

Redemption is a 1930 American pre-Code drama film directed by Fred Niblo, produced and distributed by Metro-Goldwyn-Mayer, and starring John Gilbert. This production is Gilbert's first talking film, but it was not released until months after the premiere of His Glorious Night, his second "talkie". Redemption is based on the 1918 Broadway play of the same title by Arthur Hopkins, who in turn based his work on the play The Living Corpse by Leo Tolstoy and first staged in Moscow in 1911.

== Plot ==
Living in Russia in the early 1900s, Fedya Protasoff is a handsome, self-indulgent womanizer who continues to squander his family inheritance drinking and gambling. He meets and falls in love with Lisa, the fiancée of his friend Victor Karenin. Soon he lures her away from Victor and marries her. After a year together, Lisa has their child, a boy; but after another year of marriage, Fedya tires of the monotony of home life and resumes his profligate ways. He is tortured by his conscience for mistreating Lisa, but he fails to reform his behavior. Finally, his reckless social life results in gambling debts so large that he is forced to sell his estate. Despite Fedya's deplorable actions, Victor displays an act of enduring friendship and helps him by purchasing the estate at auction for the greatly inflated price of 125,000 rubles.

While his marriage to Lisa continues to crumble, Fedya becomes infatuated with a young "Gypsy" woman, Masha, and they begin living together in a "cheap boarding house". This leads him to make a final break with Lisa by sending her a suicide note and then faking his death. Masha assists him in the ruse by placing some of his clothes and his "pocketbook" on a riverbank. Fedya then goes into hiding, leaving family members and friends to conclude that he had deliberately drowned himself since they knew he could not swim. The deception is further enhanced by sheer coincidence when authorities a week later pull out of the river the body of another man who had actually drowned there. Lisa is brought in by police to identify the badly decomposed corpse. Terribly distressed and certain that Fedya had carried out his suicide note, she barely looks at the "horror" and hastily affirms that the remains are those of her husband.

Long-suffering Lisa now marries Victor. Fedya's deceit, however, is eventually discovered, and he is arrested for fraud. His arrest also draws Lisa and Victor into court on charges of bigamy. The couple professes their innocence and insist that they truly believed Fedya was dead before they married. When Feyda enters the court to testify, he is a broken man emotionally as well as physically. He confesses that he had indeed faked his death and insists too that Lisa and his former friend are blameless. Confronted with his duplicity and with the guilt that he is continuing to destroy any hope of happiness for Lisa and Victor, he has an associate, Petushkov, bring him a pistol outside the courthouse. With the weapon tucked inside his coat, Fedya watches Lisa, Victor, and others file past him and walk down the building's front steps. He then quietly says, "I'll pass on" and shoots himself. Horrified, Lisa screams and rushes to Fedya, cradling him in her arms. As he dies, he asks for forgiveness, calls for Masha, and utters his final word, "happiness".

== Cast ==
- John Gilbert as Fedya
- Renée Adorée as Masha
- Eleanor Boardman as Lisa
- Conrad Nagel as Victor
- Claire McDowell as Anna Pavlovna
- Nigel De Brulier as Petushkov
- Charles Quartermaine as Artimiev
- Erville Alderson as sailor talking to Fedya in tavern
- Tully Marshall as the blackmailer in tavern
- Mack Swain as magistrate
- Sidney Bracey as waiter
- Richard Alexander as policeman (credited as Dick Alexander)

== Production ==
Director Fred Niblo began production on Redemption on February 25, 1929, almost 14 months before the film's release in early April 1930. Initially, according to the widely read trade paper The Film Daily, Niblo intended to do two versions of the film. The paper reports in its March 4, 1929 issue that he "will make [a] silent version of Redemption, first, after which a talker version will be made." It also announces, "The film stars John Gilbert, marking the M-G-M star's first appearance in a talker." Exhibitors Herald-World also informed theater owners that work on the silent version had already started the last week in February.

News updates in trade publications document that filming on the production stretched from March to late-June 1929. That length of time suggests that Niblo was working on both silent and sound versions, but at some point during that period MGM canceled the former and committed to only completing a talkie.

Despite several months of filming, editing, and readjusting recorded dialogue, MGM remained dissatisfied with the results. The studio even enlisted Lionel Barrymore to redirect some scenes as part of a "salvage attempt". Nevertheless, while the film was set for release either in the late summer or early autumn in 1929, it was instead "shelved after failing to impress studio executives".

== Release ==
By February 1930, a full year after production started on the film, studio personnel and other Hollywood insiders, including reporters and writers for trade publications and popular fan magazines, were aware that MGM executives clearly had problems with the overall quality of Redemption and had postponed the film's release until well after the premiere of His Glorious Night, Gilbert's second screen project with recorded dialogue. His Glorious Night opened on September 28, 1929, six months before the release of Redemption. The February issue of Photoplay includes a feature article by Katherine Albert titled "Is Jack Gilbert Through?" In her article, Albert speculates why Redemption, which she refers to as a "sorry affair", was "temporarily shelved" and still not released by early 1930. She contends that recording problems with Gilbert's "high-pitched, tense” voice and the star's rattled nerves in the presence of "the little talking device" as two reasons for the delayed release of Redemption. She asks, "Will it ever be released?"

== Reception ==
In 1930, the film received widespread negative reviews from critics in major newspapers and in leading trade publications. Variety, the most popular entertainment paper at the time, found nothing good to say about Redemption, describing in its May 7 review as an inept production that was mind-numbing to watch despite its relatively brief running time of 65 minutes:

Dull, sluggish, agonizing. Hardly a redeeming aspect. Even the photography, editing, and other taken-for-granted items are under standard....Indeed it may fairly be advanced as a trade angle that the more first runs this film plays the greater the injury will be done to the very thing which is its one selling point, namely, Gilbert's star rating....Story is a mutilated, old-fashioned adaptation of Tolstoy's "Living Corpse" with the flapper's big thrill cast in the role of the corpse. Endless succession of scenes jumping from one to the other, never clear, and producing nothing but mental fatigue in the spectator.

For their participation in what Variety labels a cinematic "long yawn", the paper predicts, "Gilbert will be the chief sufferer and Fred Niblo will not go unharmed in reputation."

The Film Daily panned the film as well, calling it a "decidedly mediocre drama" that is "weak in nearly every department, including acting and direction". While it judged both Eleanor Boardman and Gilbert's performances as "unconvincing", the paper does credit Conrad Nagel with being "the only principal player who seems real." Poor direction and "choppy" editing are The Film Daily's main complaints. "It is difficult", it states, "to associate this incompetent piece with [Niblo]." The New York Herald Tribune added to the chorus of negative reactions to the film in 1930. In its May 3 review, the Manhattan newspaper also makes a prediction: "We do not believe this film is going to be a great big hit." The Herald Tribune based that prediction chiefly on Gilbert's "uneven performance". Yet, with a degree of optimism, the newspaper expresses hope for the star's prospects in the new era of sound, "In time he may catch on to the demands of dialogue in films, but at the moment he remains...a far better pantomime artist than speaking actor." "His voice", continues the Herald Tribune, "is all right, but his acting is so often self-conscious, wooden and even floundering."

The respected New York-based trade journal Harrison's Reports insisted that John Gilbert was not to blame for the film's lack of critical success and its disappointing draw at the box office. Promoting itself as "A Reviewing Service Free from the Influence of Film Advertising", the journal in its May 10, 1930 review assigns blame to the most fundamental aspect of any production:

The producers of this picture, which was made by them more than one year ago, attribute its poor quality to the voice of John Gilbert. But they are altogether wrong; the fault lies, not in the voice of John Gilbert, which is not bad, but in the poor quality of the screen story. The most melodius voice could not have made it more interesting. Some of the situations are impossible; Mr. Gilbert is called upon to act anything but as a regular human being.

Outside the realms of trade journals and newspapers, even fan magazines in 1930 disliked the film. Screenland, for example, refers to Redemption in its July issue as "deep, dreary" and full of "Russian gloom", cautioning its readers, "you will probably writhe your way through this film." Another publication for fans of the "silver screen", Picture Play, characterized the film as "dull, old-fashioned, superficial". The magazine's reviewer Norbert Lusk saw little in Gilbert's starring role to attract theater audiences, although he did find Boardman and Adorée's voices pleasing after hearing them for the first time:

Judging by silent standards, his performance is not among his good ones. The character is hardly comprehensible to any one who has not read the novel, and it is entirely without sympathy. There is nothing to endear Fedya to those who meet him for the first time....Quite enough has been said about Mr. Gilbert's voice to make further mention superfluous. Eleanor Boardman's voice, heard for the first time, is smoothly expressive, and Renée Adorée likewise reveals no loss of power and charm through audibility.

== Home media ==
The film was released on Warner Home Video On Demand DVD.
