= Polly of the Follies =

1922 film by John Emerson

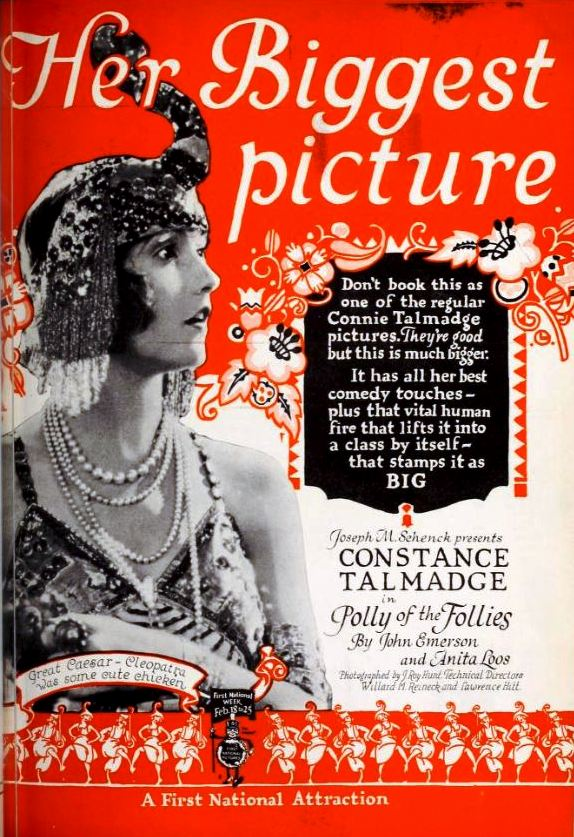
- Advertisement
- Directed by: John Emerson
- Written by: John Emerson; Anita Loos
- Story by: John Emerson; Anita Loos
- Produced by: Constance Talmadge
- Starring: Constance Talmadge; Horace Knight; Thomas Carr
- Cinematography: J. Roy Hunt
- Production company: Constance Talmadge Film Company
- Distributed by: Associated First National Pictures, Inc.
- Release date: January 30, 1922
- Running time: Seven reels
- Country: United States
- Language: Silent (English intertitles)

Polly of the Follies is a 1922 American silent romantic comedy film starring Constance Talmadge, Horace Knight, and Thomas Carr. It is presumed to be lost; all that is known to have survived is a trailer. An intertitle from the trailer states that Talmadge plays "a stagestruck country girl who hits New York and strikes Ziegfeld for a job". According to the Internet Movie Database, this was James Gleason's film debut. A trailer for the film was preserved by the Academy Film Archive in 2009.

== Plot ==
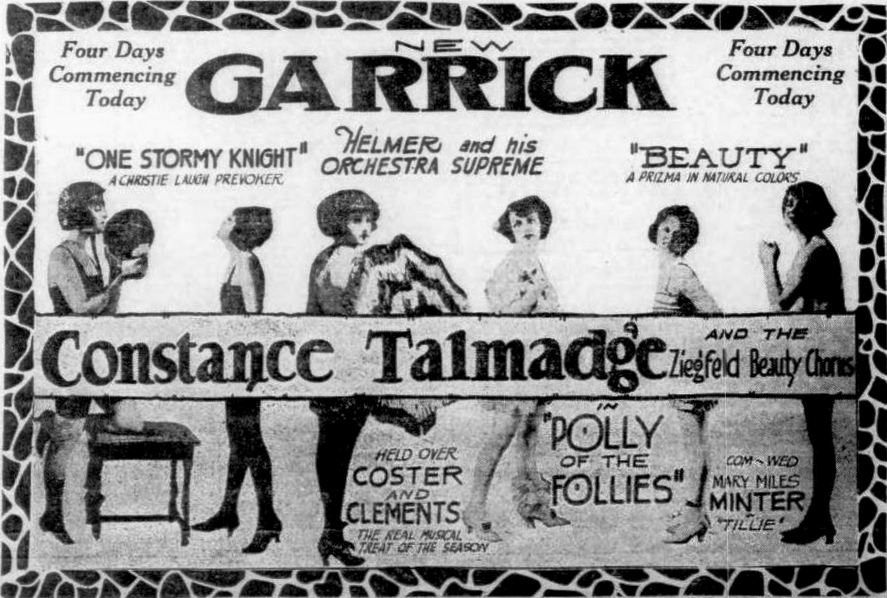
Newspaper advertisement

The film is a romantic comedy, focusing on the love triangle between Bob Jones, Alysia Potter and Polly Meachum. Originally engaged, Bob and Alysia elope to Bowling Green, Connecticut, where they meet Silas Meachum, a campaigner against motion pictures, and his daughter, Polly. The eloping couple’s family arrive, chasing them, and persuade them to wait to get married. Polly goes to New York to join the Ziegfeld Follies, but is ultimately replaced by Alysia. As Bob consoles Polly, Alysia breaks off the engagement, and Bob and Polly may now marry.

== Cast ==
- Constance Talmadge as Polly Meacham
- Horace Knight as Silas Meacham
- Thomas Carr as Jimmy Meacham
- Harry Fisher as Pop Cummings
- Frank Lalor as Daddy Hood
- George Fawcett as Mr. Jones
- Ina Borke as Mrs. Jones
- Mildred Arden as Hattie Jones
- Kenneth Harlan as Bob Jones
- Paul Doucet as Clarence Hope
- Teresa Maxwell-Conover as Mrs. Potter (credited as Theresa Maxwell Conover)
- Billie Dove as Alysia Potter
- James Gleason as Paul Gordon
- Bernard Randall as Flo Ziegfeld
- John Daly Murphy as Julius Caesar
