= The Daughter Pays =

1920 silent film

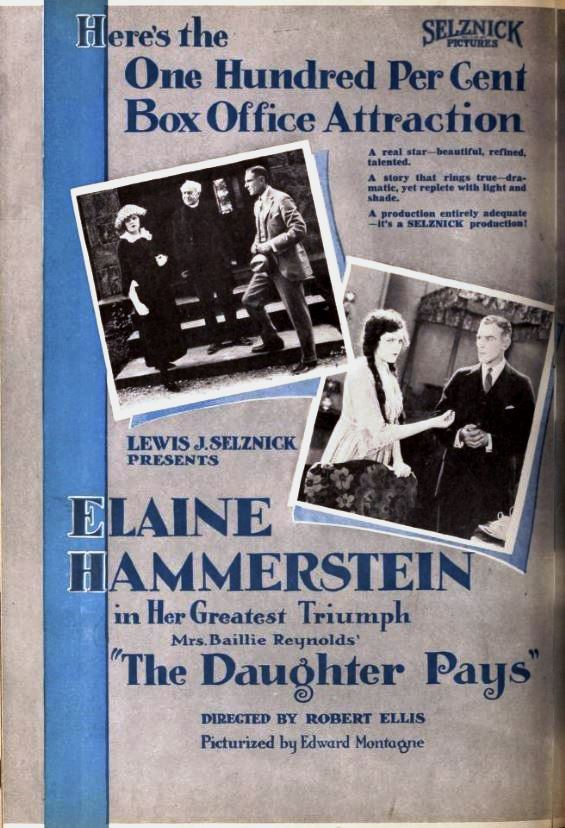
- Advertisement
- Directed by: Robert Ellis
- Written by: Baillie Reynolds (novel); Edward J. Montagne; R. Cecil Smith
- Produced by: Lewis J. Selznick
- Starring: Elaine Hammerstein; Norman Trevor; Robert Ellis
- Cinematography: John W. Brown
- Production company: Selznick Pictures
- Distributed by: Select Pictures
- Release date: November 10, 1920
- Running time: 50 minutes
- Country: United States
- Language: Silent (English intertitles)

The Daughter Pays is a 1920 American silent drama film directed by Robert Ellis and starring Elaine Hammerstein, Norman Trevor, and Robert Ellis. Produced by Selznick Pictures and distributed by Select Pictures, it was released in the United States on November 10, 1920. The screenplay, written by Edward J. Montagne and R. Cecil Smith, is based on a novel by Baillie Reynolds.

== Plot ==
Osbert Gault, a wealthy man, seeks to punish a woman who had "jilted" (rejected) him years earlier. To exact his revenge, he targets her daughter, Virginia Mynors. Unaware of Gault's bitter history with her mother, Virginia agrees to marry him. She consents to the union primarily to save her family from extreme poverty and to help her crippled sister. Once they are married, Gault carries out his plan to "make the daughter pay" for her mother's perceived sins. He subjects Virginia to continuous emotional humiliation and psychological strain, hoping to break her spirit.

Eventually, Virginia breaks down under the weight of his abuse. Her suffering triggers a change in Gault, who begins to feel genuine remorse for his actions. In an attempt to atone for his behavior, Gault grants Virginia her freedom and pays for the medical treatment needed to cure her crippled sister. After a series of "misadventures" and time apart, Gault realizes he has truly fallen in love with Virginia. Virginia, finding that she has also grown to love her husband despite his past cruelty, chooses to return to him.

== Cast ==
- Elaine Hammerstein as Virginia Mynors
- Norman Trevor as Osbert Gault
- Robert Ellis as Gerald Roseborough
- Teresa Maxwell-Conover as Mrs. Mynors
- Byron Russell as Percy Ferris
- Dore Davidson as Mr. Roseborough
- Evelyn Times as Pansy Mynors
- Lota Cheek as Vivi
- Augustus Fleming as The Gentleman
- Nora Cecil as Stern Lady

== Production and legacy ==
The film was produced by Lewis J. Selznick for Selznick Pictures. It features Lota Cheek, an early 1920s beauty icon known as "America's Prettiest Girl," in her only known screen appearance. The film had a running time of approximately 50 minutes and is currently listed as a lost film, with no known copies residing in public archives.

== Bibliography ==
- Goble, Alan. The Complete Index to Literary Sources in Film. Walter de Gruyter, 1999.
