= Lota Cheek =

American actress and model (1898–1978)

- Born: Lota Baker Cheek; 31 August 1898; Pavo, Georgia, United States
- Died: 22 April 1978 (aged 79); Tucson, Arizona, United States
- Other names: America's Prettiest Girl; Lota B. Cheek; Laurette Taylor
- Education: Cox College
- Occupations: Actress; Model; Music Teacher
- Years active: 1920 – 1930
- Spouse(s): Robert Platt Stout (m. 1916; div. 1920) F.L. Simmons (m. 1922; div. 1923) Tyrell Davis (m. 1924; div. 1924) Harry Sanders (m. 1925)
- Children: 2

Lota Cheek (August 31, 1898 – April 22, 1978), also known as Lota Baker Cheek-Sanders and professionally as Lota Sanders, was an American beauty queen and actress in the 1920s. She rose to fleeting national fame in the early 1920s during the Jazz Age. She was widely publicized as "America's Prettiest Girl" after winning a series of beauty contests, which launched her acting career in New York City's entertainment industry. She was known for winning a New York City beauty contest and being declared "America's Prettiest Girl" in 1921.

== Early life and education ==
Lota Cheek was born in Pavo, Georgia, the daughter of a farmer named Leon Cheek. Growing up in a rural environment, she later moved to New York City to pursue a career in the public eye. She went to Atlanta and attended Cox College.

Lota's mother Nannie was involved in a notorious legal case when Lota was a toddler. In 1900, Nannie was arrested for her alleged involvement in the killing of her first husband, William Danzey. The incident, which also resulted in the death of a brother-in-law, stemmed from a custody dispute over the two children Nannie shared with Danzey. Nannie was convicted of manslaughter and sentenced to two years in prison, which she entered with her three-month-old baby, James. She was paroled in late 1901 due to concerns for the baby's health. Nannie died in 1917, four years before Lota achieved her beauty queen fame.

== Career ==
=== Rise to National Stardom (1921–1922) ===
Cheek gained initial public attention when she won a Boston beauty contest in 1921, earning a $1,000 prize ($18,170.50 in 2025). Her fame increased substantially when she won a major New York City beauty contest in 1922, defeating 6,000 contestants and earning the official title of "America's prettiest girl".

=== Film Career and Studio Setbacks ===
Following her pageant success, Cheek moved to Hollywood in 1922 to pursue silent films. To separate her film ambitions from her pageant persona, she adopted the stage name Laurette Taylor. She was under contract to Selznick Pictures, owned by Lewis J. Selznick. Her only screen appearance was in The Daughter Pays (1920). Her film career was cut short when Selznick Pictures faced financial instability and eventually entered bankruptcy in 1923, leaving several of her works as lost films.

=== Broadway Reinvention and Stage Success ===
Despite her film career setbacks and a highly publicized bigamy scandal in 1922—where it was revealed her husband F.L. Simmons was already married to another woman. Rather than fading away after the collapse of her film studio, Cheek returned to New York and reinvented herself as a serious stage actress under the name Lota Sanders. She became a staple of the 1920s Broadway. She became a star of the Earl Carroll's Vanities of 1923 and appeared in numerous productions.

Her striking looks and long, unconventional tresses, which challenged the popular bobbed-hair fashion of the Flapper era, garnered significant media attention. This notoriety launched her acting career in New York. She appeared in several Broadway productions, most notably in Earl Carroll's Vanities of 1923, and other plays under the name Lota Sanders. She also worked as a model and music teacher.

Her sudden fame led to a career in New York's theatrical scene. She appeared in the popular Broadway revues. She was also a model, notably appearing in advertisements for Colgate toothpaste in 1927. She appeared in many Broadway productions in total, sometimes under the name Lota Sanders after her marriage.

She was a featured star in the 1923 edition of this famous, high-spectacle revue. Her prolific theater career included roles in The Dancing Girl (1923), The Vanities (1923), That Awful Mrs. Eaton (1924), Simon Called Peter (1924), and her major success in the comedy The Man from Toronto (1926).

=== Retirement and "Preserving the Image" ===
In 1930, after her final role in the play Cafe, Cheek retired from public life to focus on her family. By the 1940s, she was living in Tucson, Arizona, working as a private secretary. During this period, several major film studios offered her new contracts to return to the screen. Cheek politely declined every offer. She explained that she had created a specific image in the silent era as a young "serial" beauty and did not wish to "spoil" or tarnish that youthful legacy by appearing as an older woman in a different era of film.

== Personal life and scandal ==
Cheek had a complex personal life marked by several marriages. She first married Robert Platt Stout in Alabama in 1916 and divorced him in 1920.

In 1922, she was involved in a public scandal when a woman, Mrs. E. C. Simmons (sometimes spelled Seimmons), named her as a co-respondent in her divorce case. It was revealed that Cheek's husband at the time, an F.L. Simmons (or Seimmons), had married Lota without first obtaining a proper divorce from his previous wife, making his marriage to Cheek legally invalid. Lota was engaged to silent film star Buster Keaton. It was seen as a potential "power couple" pairing between a top Broadway beauty and one of Hollywood's biggest stars.

The engagement was called off abruptly shortly after it began but this occurred during a turbulent period in both of their lives—Lota was dealing with the fallout of a bigamy scandal involving her previous husband, and Keaton's personal life and career were entering a more complex phase.

In 1924, Lota married the British actor Tyrell Davis in Manhattan while both were performing on Broadway. However, their marriage lasted only a few months as they divorced when Davis returned to England and Lota remained in the United States.

By 1925, she had remarried yet again and took the surname of her new husband, Harry Sanders, and generally used this name thereafter. She and her husband, Mr. Sanders, had two children together.

== Later life and death ==
After her period of fame, Lota Cheek-Sanders lived a private life. She died on April 22, 1978, in Tucson, Arizona, at the age of 79.

== Filmography ==
=== Film ===
Year	Title	Role	Notes
1920	The Daughter Pays	Vivi	Debut; Silent film

=== Stage ===
Year	Title	Role(s)	Venue(s)	Notes
1921	All Soul's Eve	Girl	Palace Theatre	
1922	Make It Snappy	Chorus	Winter Garden	
1923	The Dancing Girl	Dancer	New York Theatre	
1923	Simon's Called Peter	Louise	Klaw Theatre	
1923	The Vanities	Dancer	Earl Carroll Theatre	
1924	That Awful Mrs. Eaton	Mrs. Branch	Morosco Theatre	
1926	The Man From Toronto	Ada	Selwyn Theatre	
1927	Black Velvet	Chorus	Liberty Theatre	
1930	Cafe	Ruth	Ritz Theatre	
