= Love Is Dangerous (film) =

- Theatrical release poster
- Directed by: Richard Thorpe
- Screenplay by: Stuart Anthony, Beulah Poynter
- Produced by: George R. Batcheller
- Starring: John Warburton, Rochelle Hudson, Bradley Page, Judith Vosselli, Dorothy Revier
- Cinematography: M.A. Andersen
- Edited by: Roland D. Reed
- Production company: George R. Batcheller Productions
- Distributed by: Chesterfield Motion Pictures Corporation, First Division Pictures, Equity British Films, Commonwealth Pictures Corporation
- Release date: March 15, 1933
- Running time: 67 minutes
- Country: United States
- Language: English

Love Is Dangerous is a 1933 American pre-Code comedy film directed by Richard Thorpe and starring John Warburton, Rochelle Hudson, Bradley Page, Judith Vosselli, and Dorothy Revier. The film is also known as Love Is Like That.

== Plot ==
Gwendolyn, an 18-year-old girl, falls in love with Steve, a misogynistic bachelor, just upon seeing his picture. She manages to meet him, but he pushes her away. She then arranges to meet him again the same evening at the Steve's mother's house. Gwendolyn's sister, whose husband is extremely jealous, also goes there with a friend to teach her husband a lesson...

== Cast ==
- John Warburton as Steve
- Rochelle Hudson as Gwendolyn
- Bradley Page as Dean Scarsdale
- Judith Vosselli as Emily Scarsdale
- Dorothy Revier as Pat Ormsby
- Albert Conti as R.J. Ormsby
- Herta Lynd as Paula
- May Beatty as Gloria
- Lorin Raker as Tom
