= The Lady Who Dared =

1931 film

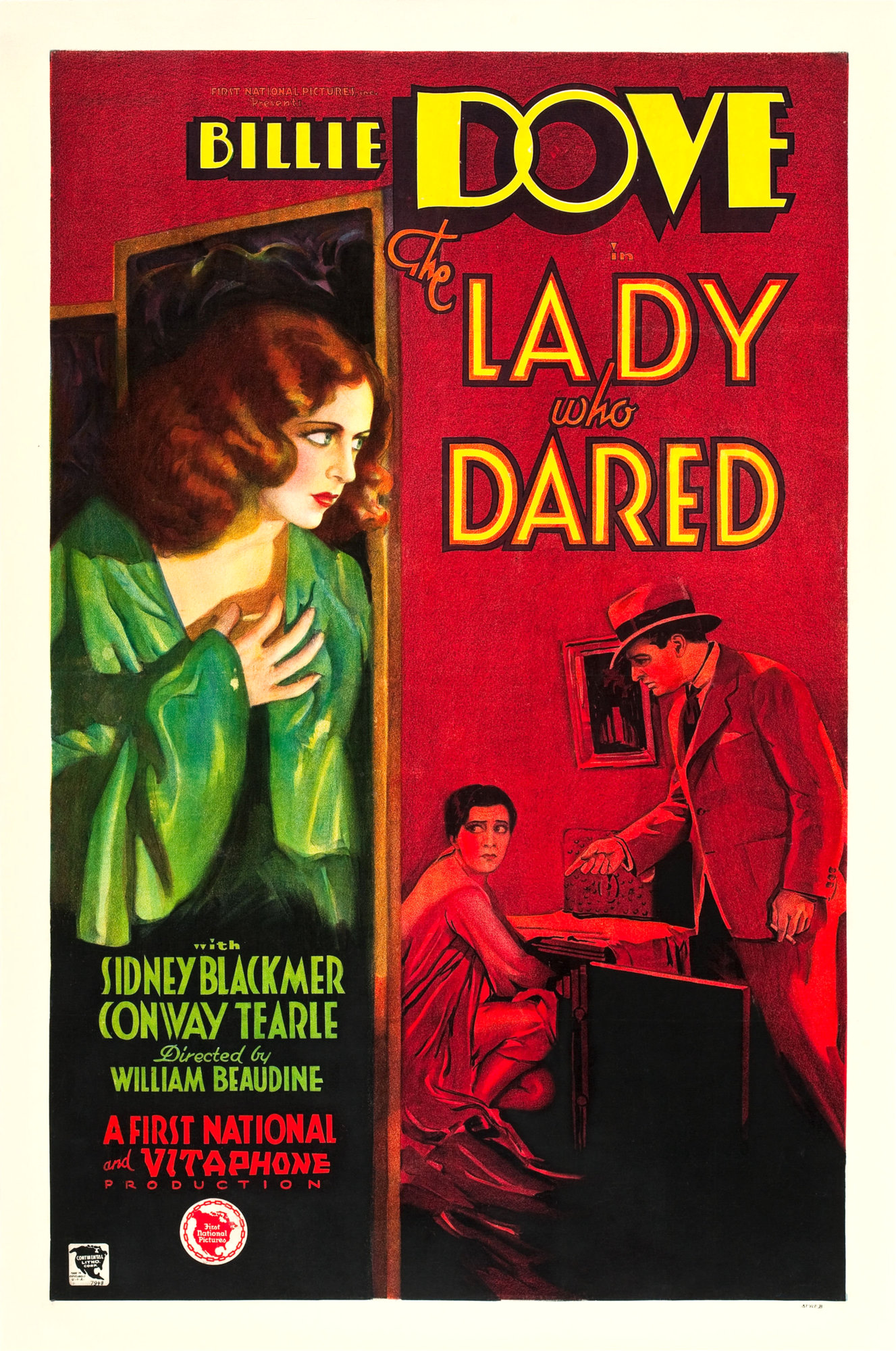
- Film poster
- Directed by: William Beaudine
- Written by: Forrest Halsey; Kenneth J. Saunders; Kathryn Scola
- Starring: Billie Dove; Sidney Blackmer; Conway Tearle; Judith Vosselli
- Cinematography: Tony Gaudio
- Edited by: LeRoy Stone
- Music by: Alois Reiser
- Production company: First National Pictures
- Distributed by: Warner Bros. Pictures, Inc.
- Release date: May 29, 1931
- Running time: 55 minutes
- Country: United States
- Language: English

The Lady Who Dared is a 1931 American pre-Code drama film directed by William Beaudine and starring Billie Dove, Sidney Blackmer and Conway Tearle.

Print survival, Library of Congress and Turner.

== Plot ==
Blackmail prompts a smuggler into obtaining incriminating photos of a diplomat's wife, but he falls in love with her instead.

== Cast ==
- Billie Dove as Margaret Townsend
- Sidney Blackmer as Charles Townsend
- Conway Tearle as Jack Norton
- Judith Vosselli as Julianne Boone-Fleming
- Cosmo Kyrle Bellew as Seton Boone-Fleming
- Ivan F. Simpson as Butler
- Mathilde Comont as Chambermaid
- Lloyd Ingraham as Farrell

== Bibliography ==
- Marshall, Wendy L. William Beaudine: From Silents to Television. Scarecrow Press, 2005.
