= All at Sea (1935 film) =

1935 British film by Anthony Kimmins

- Tyrell Davis and Googie Withers in the film
- Directed by: Anthony Kimmins
- Written by: Charles Bennett; Ian Hay; Anthony Kimmins
- Based on: play Mr Faint-Heart by Ian Hay
- Produced by: Robert Arthur
- Starring: Tyrell Davis; Googie Withers; James Carew; Cecily Byrne; Rex Harrison; Dorothy Vernon
- Cinematography: Alex Bryce
- Edited by: Sam Simmonds
- Production company: Fox Film Company
- Distributed by: Fox Film Company (UK)
- Release date: 10 February 1936 (UK)
- Running time: 60 minutes
- Country: United Kingdom
- Language: English

All at Sea is a 1935 British comedy film directed by Anthony Kimmins and starring Googie Withers, Tyrell Davis and Rex Harrison. It was written by Charles Bennett, Ian Hay and Kimmins based on Hay's 1931 play Mr Faint-Heart and was made as a quota quickie by Fox Film at Wembley Studios. The plot follows a young man who falls in love during a cruise, and takes up a false identity as a famous writer to impress her.

== Preservation status ==
The British Film Institute National Archive holds a collection of stills but no film or video materials.

== Premise ==
When mild mannered Joe comes into an inheritance, he leaves his job as a clerk, and embarks on a sea cruise. Posing as a successful writer, Joe attracts various attractive women to him on the voyage, but his deceptions start to land him in trouble.

== Cast ==
- Tyrell Davis as Joe Finch
- Googie Withers as Daphne Tomkins
- James Carew as Julius Mablethorpe
- Cecily Byrne as Mary Maggs
- Rex Harrison as Aubrey Bellingham
- Dorothy Vernon as Mrs. Humphrey
- James Harcourt as Mr. Humphrey
- Colin Lesslie as Tony Lambert

== Critical reception ==
Kine Weekly wrote: "The plot appears to be threadbare in parts when magnified to the full dimensions of the screen, but its artless blend of sentiment, romance and humour should nevertheless sausfy the unsophisticated. ... Tyrrell Davis is quite good as the hesitant self-conscious Joe, but Googie Withers is very colourless as Daphne, and Rex Harrison overacts as Aubrey."

The Daily Film Renter wrote: "This slender story has been directed with very little imagination, most of the entertainment deriving from the shipboard atmosphere, which is well done. There are no big situations, save, perhaps, for the clerk's self-denunciation before his fellow fassengers at the concert, but even this hardly provides dramatic punch. The whole thing meanders along in meaningless fashion."

Picturegoer wrote: " It is a very thin affair; artless and lacking in polish."

TV Guide called it a "Tepid programmer."
