= Under Proof =

1936 film by Roland Gillett

- Directed by: Roland Gillett
- Screenplay by: Roland Gillett
- Produced by: Roland Gillett
- Starring: Betty Stockfeld; Tyrrell Davis; Judy Kelly
- Cinematography: Stanley Grant
- Production company: Wembley Studios
- Release date: 1936
- Running time: 50 minutes
- Country: United Kingdom
- Language: English

Under Proof is a 1936 British comedy crime film directed, written. and produced by Roland Gillett and starring Betty Stockfeld, Tyrell Davis and Judy Kelly., It was made as a quota quickie. The screenplay concerns a man who is threatened into joining a gang of smugglers.

== Plot ==
Timid young man Dudley, together with his fiancée Vivian, are caught in a storm and seek shelter in a deserted house. They soon discover that the house is being used as a hide-out by a gang of liquor smugglers. Awaiting the arrival of their mysterious boss, the crooks mistakely assume him to be Dudley. Fortified by brandy, he goes along with the confusion, and subsequently brings the gang to justice.

== Cast ==
- Betty Stockfeld as Vivian
- Tyrell Davis as Dudley
- Judy Kelly as Corone
- Guy Middleton as Bruce
- Charles Farrell as Spike
- Viola Compton as Mrs. Richards
- David Horne as Dr. Walton
- Edward Ashley as Ward Delaney
- Henry B. Longhurst as Inspector Holt

== Reception ==
The Monthly Film Bulletin wrote: "The story is weak and improbable, and the treatment is slow. The acting is mediocre."

Kine Weekly wrote: "Crude melodrama so old-fashioned in story tehnique, poorly enacted, indifferently directed and poverty stricken in presentation as to finish inevitably amongst the also rans. The quota angle is no excuse for this misguided essay in entertainment best served by the Americans."

The Daily Film Renter wrote: "Melodrama of stranded party's adventures in country house temporarily occupied by bootieggers' gang. Far-fetched and out-dated story, replete with familiar assortment of swinging window shutters, doors opening mysteriously, and stormy night. Undistinguished subject, affording quota support for popular halls. ... The plot is conventional throughout, and nothing occurs which is likely to disturb the placid state of mind which must exist with those who see the film."
