= Let's Fall in Love (film) =

1933 film by David Burton

- Directed by: David Burton
- Written by: Herbert Fields
- Produced by: Harry Cohn (Uncredited)
- Starring: Edmund Lowe; Ann Sothern
- Cinematography: Benjamin Kline
- Edited by: Gene Milford
- Music by: Harold Arlen; Ted Koehler
- Distributed by: Columbia Pictures
- Release date: December 26, 1933
- Running time: 68 minutes
- Country: United States
- Language: English

Let's Fall in Love is a 1933 American pre-Code romantic musical film starring Edmund Lowe and Ann Sothern. Released by Columbia Pictures, the film was directed by David Burton and written by Herbert Fields.

The songs Let's Fall in Love (not to be confused with the Cole Porter song sometimes called Let's Do It, Let's Fall in Love) and Love Is Love Anywhere were introduced by Ann Sothern in this film.

The film was later remade in 1949 by Douglas Sirk as Slightly French, starring Don Ameche and Dorothy Lamour.

== Plot ==
A Hollywood director (Edmund Lowe) finds himself in trouble when his latest Swedish discovery departs the shooting of his film. He finds the perfect candidate in a girl working at a fair (Ann Sothern). The only problem is, she is not in fact Swedish; a minor detail but one that can be sorted by deft handiwork and a bit of pretence.

== Cast ==
- Edmund Lowe as Ken
- Ann Sothern as Jean
- Miriam Jordan as Gerry
- Gregory Ratoff as Max
- Greta Meyer as Lisa
- Betty Furness as Linda
- John Qualen as Svente Bjorkman (uncredited)
