= The Living Corpse =

Play by Leo Tolstoy

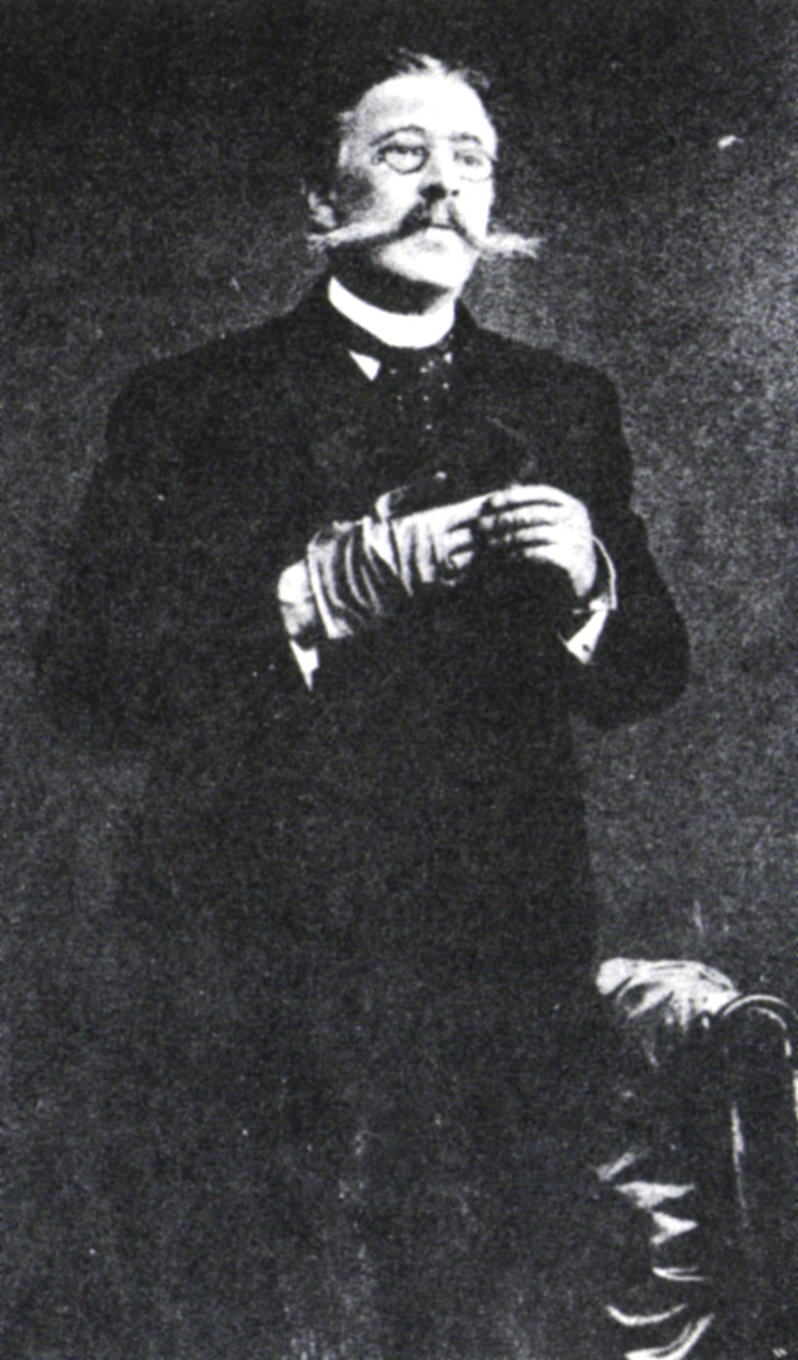
- Konstantin Stanislavski as Prince Abrezkov n the première at the Moscow Art Theatre in 1911.
- Original language: Russian
- Written by: Leo Tolstoy

Premiere
- Date: 5 October [O.S. 22 September] 1911
- Place: Moscow Art Theatre

The Living Corpse (Russian: Живой труп) is a Russian play by Leo Tolstoy. (Note: The title of the play has also been translated as The Man Who Was Dead, Redemption, and Reparation.) Although written around 1900, it was only published shortly after his death—Tolstoy had never considered the work finished. An immediate success, it is still performed. Arthur Hopkins produced its Broadway premiere in 1918 under the title Redemption, starring John Barrymore.

== Plot ==
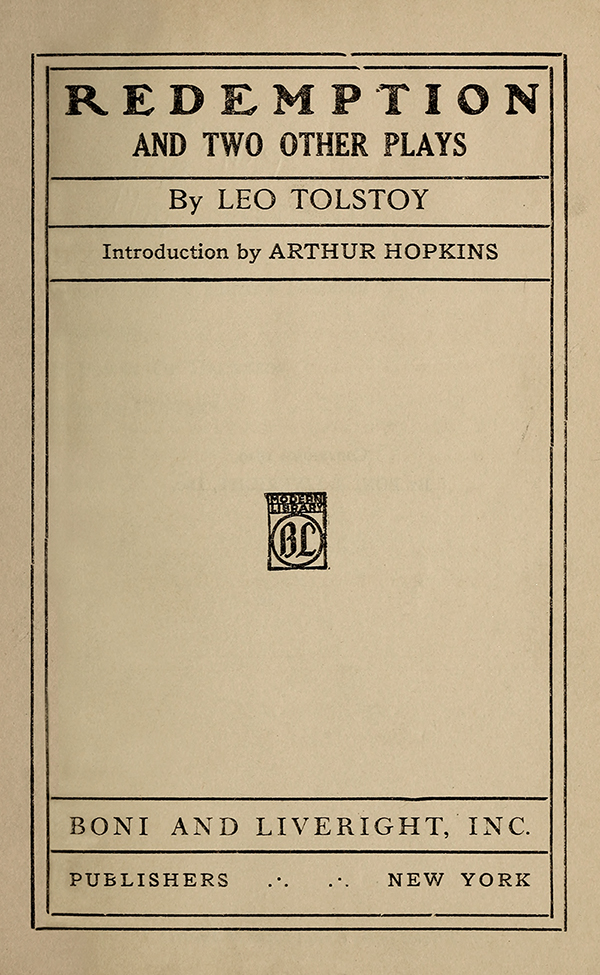
Title page of Arthur Hopkins' English-language version of the play, published in 1919

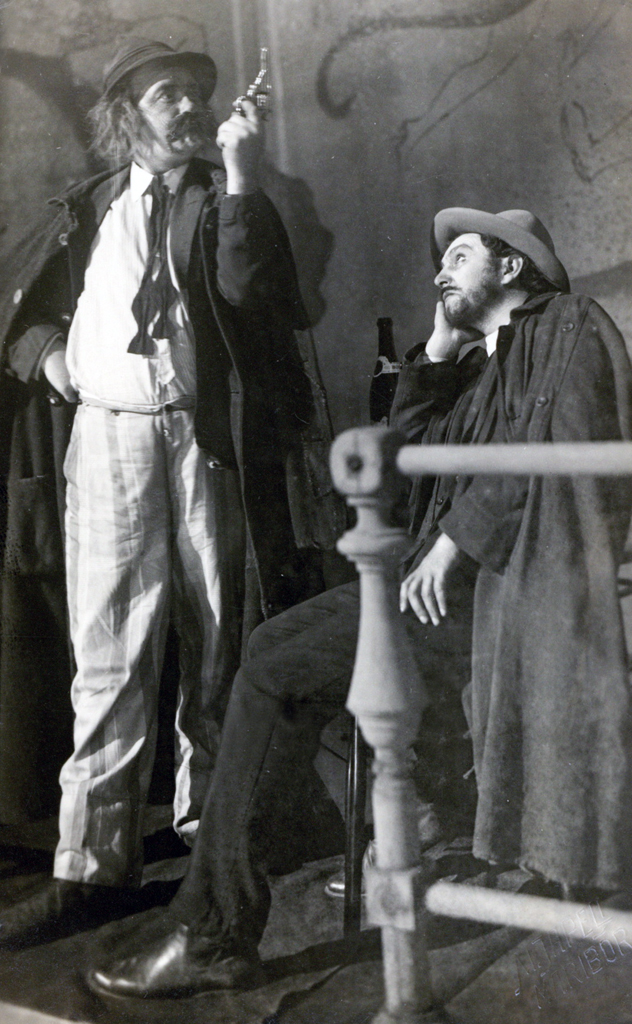
Maribor Slovene National Theatre production of the play in 1936

The central character of the play, Fedor Protasov, is tormented by the belief that his wife Liza never chose between him and Viktor Karenin, a suitor for her hand. He wants to kill himself, but doesn't have the nerve. Running away from his life, he first falls in with gypsies, and into a sexual relationship with a gypsy singer, Masha. However, due to the disapproval of Masha's parents, he runs away from this life as well. Again he wants to kill himself, but lacks the nerve; again, his descent continues.

Meanwhile, his wife, presuming him dead, has married the other man. When Protasov is discovered, she is charged with bigamy, accused of arranging her husband's disappearance. He shows up in court to testify that she had no way of knowing that he was alive; when the judge rules that his wife must either give up her new husband or be exiled to Siberia, Protasov shoots himself. Hysterically, his wife declares that it is Protasov whom she always loved.

== Production history ==
The play premiered at the Moscow Art Theatre, in a production that opened on 5 October [O.S. 22 September] 1911. It was principally directed by Vladimir Nemirovich-Danchenko, with Konstantin Stanislavski acting as a co-director. A production in Saint Petersburg followed shortly after. Soon translated into many languages, it played in Berlin, Vienna, Paris, and London.

The play received its English-language premiere in London on 6 December 1912, under the title The Man Who Was Dead (a translation by Z. Vengerova and John Pollock), in a production by the Literary Theatre Society. It was directed by A. Andreev, who came from the Theatre Royal in Belgrade. Edmond Breon played Fedor, Violet Lewis played Lisa, Laurence Anderson played Victor, Lydia Yavorska played Masha, and Anthony Ward played Prince Abreskov.

Its first performance in the United States was a Yiddish-language production in New York, produced by and starring Jacob Adler, in a translation by Leon Kobrin. It opened on 3 November 1911. Several days beforehand, the New York Times ran an extensive piece on the play by Herman Bernstein, with a synopsis so thorough as almost to amount to an English translation. Typical of the Times's somewhat disdainful attitude toward Yiddish theater at that time, the article never explicitly mentions Adler's impending production, despite being written by one of their few Jewish correspondents at that time. The production, which ran for four months, has been credited with reviving the fortunes of serious Yiddish-language theater in New York, after a period of about six years in which lighter fare had dominated.

A German-language production was staged in New York in 1916.

The play was finally performed on Broadway in English in 1918, under the title Redemption and produced by Arthur Hopkins. John Barrymore played the lead role.

== Films ==
The play has been filmed numerous times:

- Живой труп [Zhivoi trup] at IMDb (1911)
- The Weakness of Man (1916)
- Живой труп at IMDb (1918)
- Ikeru shikabane (1918)
- Bigamy (1922)
- The Living Corpse (1929)
- Redemption (1930)
- Nights of Fire (1937)
- Живой труп at IMDb (1952)
- The Living Corpse (1968)
- The Living Corpse (1981, TV film)

== Sources ==
- Adler, Jacob. 1999. A Life on the Stage: A Memoir. Trans. Lulla Rosenfeld. New York: Knopf. ISBN 0-679-41351-0.
- Benedetti, Jean. 1999. Stanislavski: His Life and Art. Revised edition. Original edition published in 1988. London: Methuen. ISBN 0-413-52520-1.
- Bernstein, Herman. 1911. "Tolstoy's Play, "The Living Corpse," Stirs Russia; Strong Melodrama Produced in Russia Will Soon be Seen in Berlin and Elsewhere--;The Story of a Worthless Husband's Failure and Final Sacrifice." New York Times Oct 29: SM5.
- Carson, L, ed. 1913. The Stage Year Book 1913. London: The Stage. Available online.
- Jones, W. Gareth. 2002. "Tolstoy Staged in Paris, Berlin, and London." In Orwin (2002, 142-161).
- Gilien, Leo. 1916. "Irving Place Production of Tolstoy Play Not Its First in America." New York Times Oct 22: X7.
- Orwin, Donna Tussing, ed. 2002. The Cambridge Companion to Tolstoy. Cambridge Companions to Literature ser. Cambridge: Cambridge UP. ISBN 0-521-52000-2.
- Rosenfeld, Lulla. 1999. Commentary. In Adler (1999, 367-370).
- Redemption, 1918, Redemption, 1928, The Living Corpse, 1929 on the Internet Broadway Database.
- —, "Gilbert Miller Stages Tolstoy Play", New York Times, Sep 27, 1919. p. 13
- —, "Leo Tolstoy's Play Makes a Triumph...", New York Times, Oct 19, 1916, 7.
