= Dance Magic (film) =

1927 silent film

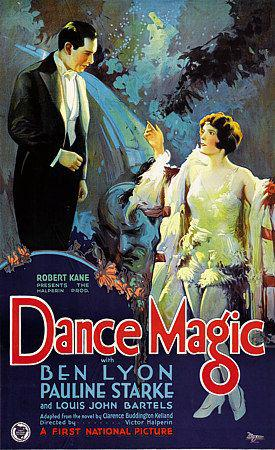
- Directed by: Victor Halperin
- Written by: Clarence Budington Kelland (novel); Adelaide Heilbron; Earle Roebuck
- Produced by: Robert Kane; Leland Hayward
- Starring: Pauline Starke; Ben Lyon; Isobel Elsom
- Cinematography: Ernest Haller
- Production company: Robert Kane Productions
- Distributed by: First National Pictures
- Release date: June 12, 1927
- Running time: 70 minutes
- Country: United States
- Languages: Silent; English intertitles

Dance Magic is a 1927 American silent drama film directed by Victor Halperin and starring Pauline Starke, Ben Lyon and Isobel Elsom.

== Cast ==
- Pauline Starke as Johala Chandler
- Ben Lyon as Leach Norcutt
- Louis John Bartels as Jed Brophy
- Isobel Elsom as Selma Bundy
- Harlan Knight as Jahala's Father
- Judith Vosselli as Her Mother

== Survival status ==
No prints survive of this feature making it a lost film.

== Bibliography ==
- Munden, Kenneth White. The American Film Institute Catalog of Motion Pictures Produced in the United States, Part 1. University of California Press, 1997.
