= Today (1930 film) =

1930 film

- Directed by: William Nigh
- Written by: George Broadhurst (play); Seton I. Miller
- Produced by: Harry Sherman; Jack D. Trop
- Starring: Conrad Nagel; Catherine Dale Owen; Sarah Padden
- Cinematography: James Wong Howe
- Production company: Harry Sherman Productions
- Distributed by: Majestic Pictures
- Release date: November 1, 1930
- Running time: 80 minutes
- Country: United States
- Language: English

Today is a 1930 American pre-Code drama film directed by William Nigh and starring Conrad Nagel, Catherine Dale Owen, and Sarah Padden. It was co-written by Seton I. Miller and was based on a 1913 play by George Howells Broadhurst, which had previously been made into a silent film of the same title. The film's sets were designed by the art director Albert S. D'Agostino.

== Plot ==
After her husband loses a fortune in the Wall Street crash and is forced to work as a used car salesman, the young wife cannot bear the loss in status.

== Cast ==
- Conrad Nagel as Fred Warner
- Catherine Dale Owen as Eve Warner
- Sarah Padden as Emma Warner
- John M. Sullivan as Henry Warner
- Judith Vosselli as Marian Garland
- Julia Swayne Gordon as Mrs. Farrington
- William Bailey as Gregory
- Edna Marion as Gloria Vernon
- Robert Thornby as Telka
- Drew Demorest as Pierre

== Bibliography ==
- Pitts, Michael R. Poverty Row Studios, 1929–1940: An Illustrated History of 55 Independent Film Companies, with a Filmography for Each. McFarland & Company, 2005.
