= Brief Moment =

1933 American drama film

- Directed by: David Burton
- Written by: Edith Fitzgerald (adaptation); Brian Marlow (adaptation)
- Based on: Brief Moment; 1931 play by S.N. Behrman
- Produced by: Felix Young
- Starring: Carole Lombard; Gene Raymond
- Cinematography: Ted Tetzlaff
- Edited by: Gene Milford
- Production company: Columbia Pictures
- Distributed by: Columbia Pictures
- Release date: September 29, 1933
- Running time: 69 minutes
- Country: United States
- Language: English

Brief Moment is a 1933 American pre-Code drama film directed by David Burton and starring Carole Lombard and Gene Raymond. It is based on the 1931, play of the same name by S. N. Behrman.

== Plot ==
Rodney Deane (Gene Raymond) is a rich playboy who falls in love with nightclub singer Abby Fane (Carole Lombard). Abby wants him to get a job, so he begins working for his father. She later finds out that he is not taking the work seriously and still spends his days at the racetrack, so she leaves him. Rodney then changes his name and gets a real job. They are reunited by Abby's boss.

== Cast ==
- Gene Raymond as Rodney Deane
- Carole Lombard as Abby Fane
- Donald Cook as Franklin Deane
- Monroe Owsley as Harold Sigrift
- Arthur Hohl as Steve Walsh
- Irene Ware as Joan
- Teresa Maxwell-Conover as Mrs. William Deane (as Teresa Maxwell)
- Reginald Mason as Mr William Deane

== Reception ==
Brief Moment received positive reviews. It has been described as 'Capraesque'. Mordaunt Hall of The New York Times wrote, "An audience cannot help but be lured into a favorable reaction."
