= I Want My Man =

1925 film

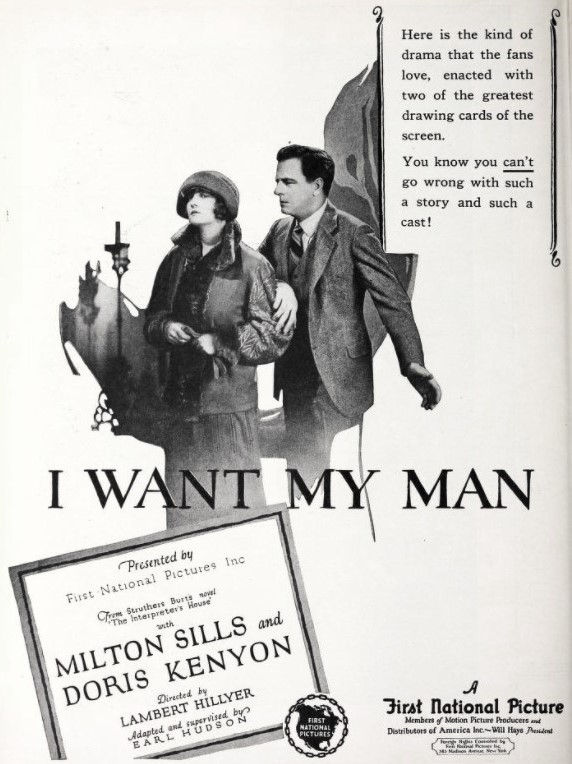
- Advertisement
- Directed by: Lambert Hillyer
- Screenplay by: Joseph F. Poland; Earle Snell; Earl Hudson
- Based on: The Interpreter's House by Maxwell Struthers Burt
- Starring: Doris Kenyon; Milton Sills; Phyllis Haver; May Allison; Kate Bruce; Paul Nicholson
- Cinematography: James Van Trees
- Production company: First National Pictures
- Distributed by: First National Pictures
- Release date: March 22, 1925
- Running time: 70 minutes
- Country: United States
- Language: Silent (English intertitles)

I Want My Man is a 1925 American drama film directed by Lambert Hillyer and written by Joseph F. Poland, Earle Snell, and Earl Hudson. It is based on the 1924 novel The Interpreter's House by Maxwell Struthers Burt. The film stars Doris Kenyon, Milton Sills, Phyllis Haver, May Allison, Kate Bruce, and Paul Nicholson. The film was released on March 22, 1925, by First National Pictures.

== Plot ==
As described in a film magazine review, Gulian Eyre, a victim of World War I, is deserted by his nurse-wife just as he is to recover his sight. She goes to New York to fight for him against Lael Satori, the girl to whom he was engaged. Vida becomes companion to his mother. Lael insists on becoming engaged again to Gulian for his money and social position. Gulian's brother, Philip, having involved hopelessly the fortune of Eyre & Co., brokers, commits suicide and Gulian is forced into the business world against his inclinations, shorn of his fortune. Lael breaks her engagement and he soon marries Vida, his mother's companion. His fingers, made sensitive through eight years of blindness, recognize her as the nurse he married in France.

== Cast ==
- Doris Kenyon as Vida
- Milton Sills as Gulian Eyre
- Phyllis Haver as Drusilla
- May Allison as Lael
- Kate Bruce as Mrs. Eyre
- Paul Nicholson as Philip
- Louis Stern as Mr. Eyre
- Teresa Maxwell-Conover as Mrs. Sartori
- Charles Lane as French Doctor
- George Howard as American Doctor

== Preservation ==
With no prints of I Want My Man located in any film archives, it is considered a lost film.
