= Prince of Diamonds =

1930 film

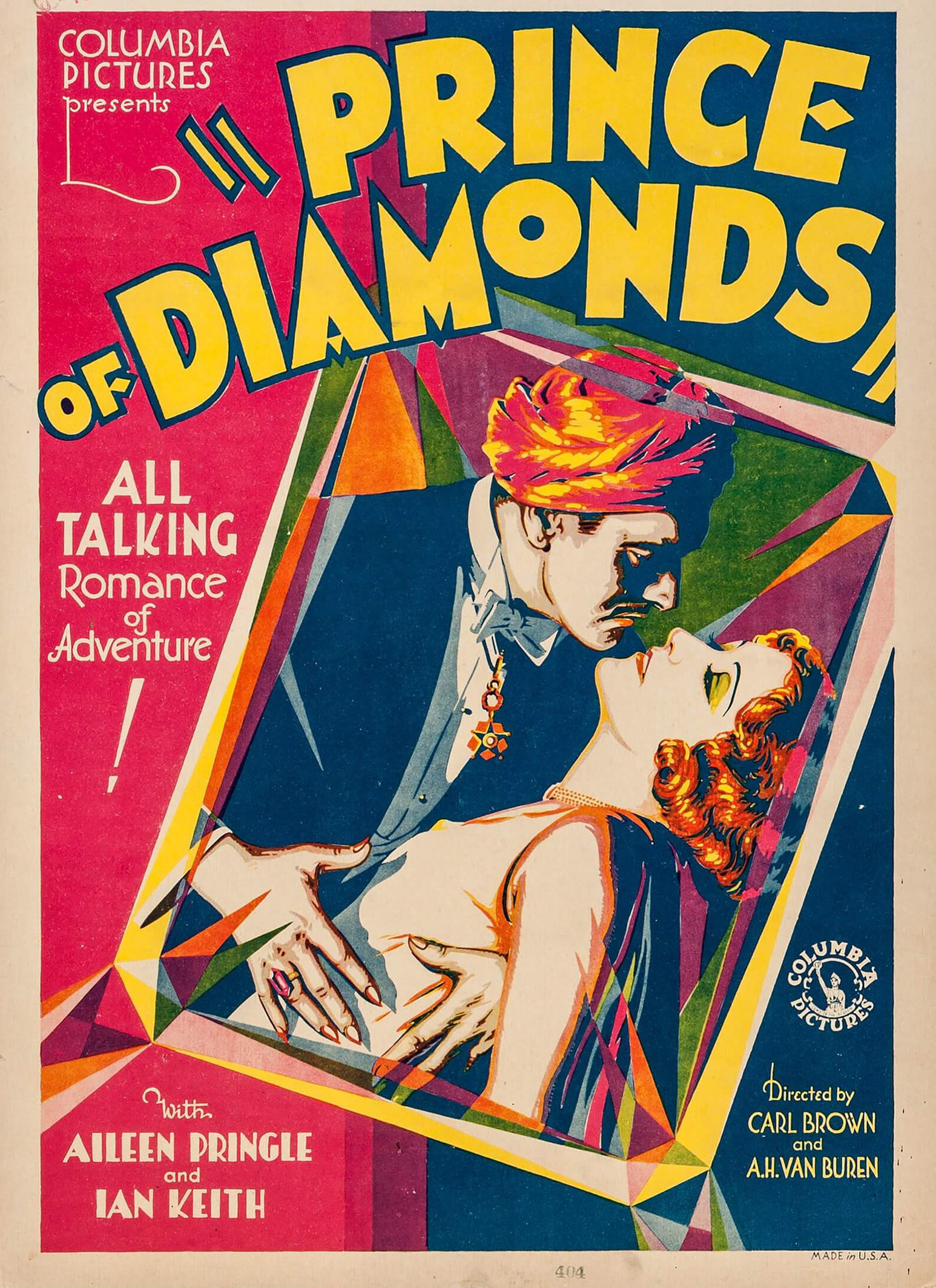
- Theatrical release poster
- Directed by: Karl Brown; A. H. Van Buren
- Screenplay by: Paul Hervey Fox
- Story by: Gene Markey
- Produced by: Harry Cohn
- Starring: Aileen Pringle; Ian Keith; Fritzi Ridgeway; Tyrell Davis; Claude King; Tom Ricketts
- Cinematography: Ted Tetzlaff
- Edited by: David Berg
- Production company: Columbia Pictures
- Distributed by: Columbia Pictures
- Release date: March 26, 1930
- Running time: 67 minutes
- Country: United States
- Language: English

Prince of Diamonds is a 1930 American pre-Code adventure film directed by Karl Brown and A. H. Van Buren and written by Paul Hervey Fox. The film stars Aileen Pringle, Ian Keith, Fritzi Ridgeway, Tyrell Davis, Claude King and Tom Ricketts. The film was released on March 26, 1930, by Columbia Pictures.

== Cast ==
- Aileen Pringle as Eve Marley
- Ian Keith as Rupert Endon
- Fritzi Ridgeway as Lolah
- Tyrell Davis as Lord Adrian
- Claude King as Gilbert Crayle
- Tom Ricketts as Williams
- E. Alyn Warren as Li Fang
- Gilbert Emery as Smith
- Frederick Sullivan as Ormsley Hatchett
- Sybil Grove as Miss Wren
- G.L. McDonnell as Betterton
- Joyzelle Joyner as Dancing Girl
