= Born Reckless (1930 film) =

1930 film directed by John Ford

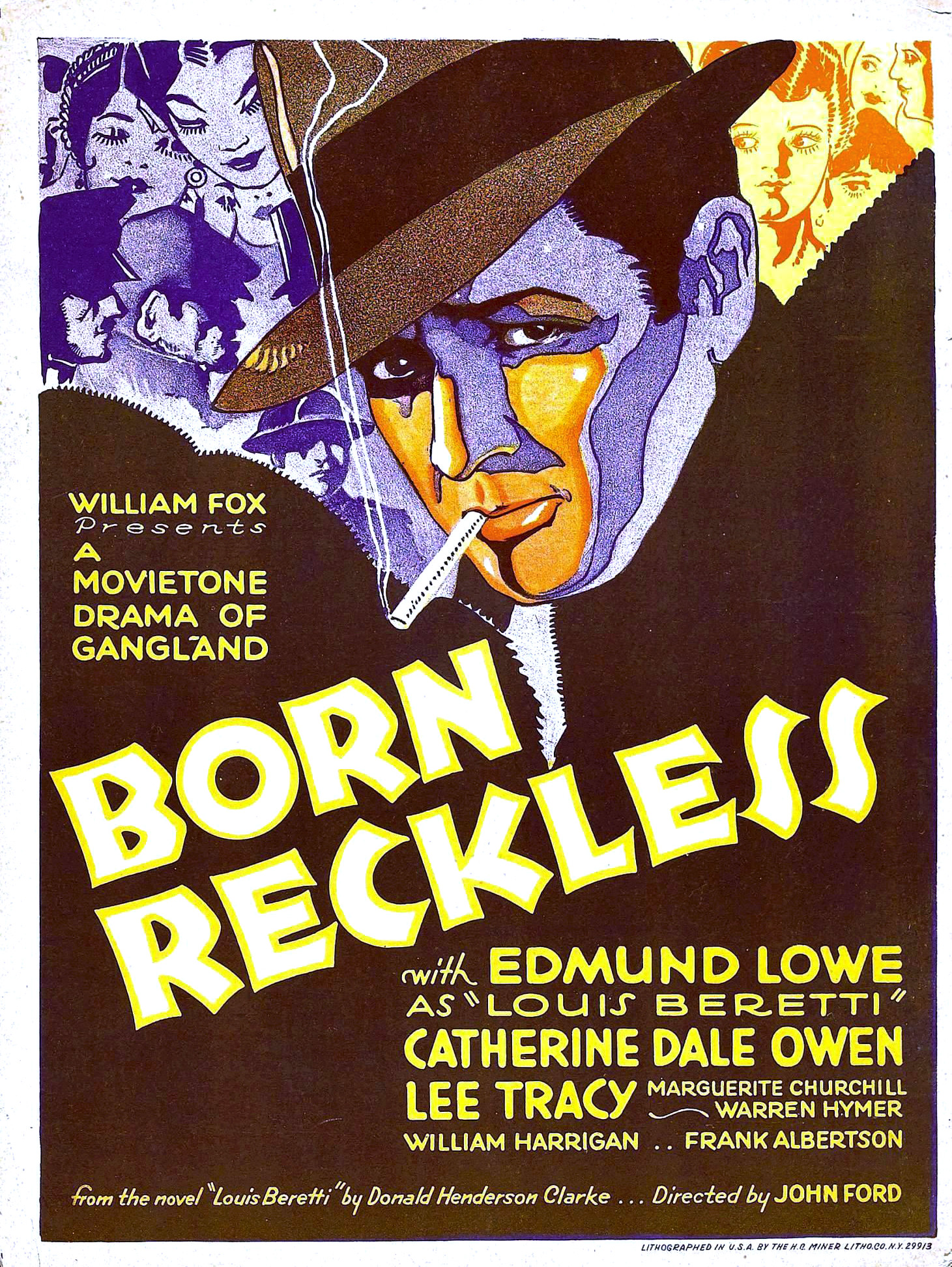
- Film poster
- Directed by: John Ford
- Written by: Dudley Nichols
- Based on: Louis Beretti; 1929 novel by Donald Henderson Clarke
- Produced by: James Kevin McGuinness
- Starring: Edmund Lowe; Catherine Dale Owen; Lee Tracy; Marguerite Churchill; Warren Hymer; William Harrigan; Frank Albertson
- Cinematography: George Schneiderman
- Edited by: Frank E. Hull
- Music by: Peter Brunelli; George Lipschultz
- Production company: Fox Film Corporation
- Distributed by: Fox Film Corporation
- Release date: May 11, 1930
- Running time: 82 minutes
- Country: United States
- Language: English

Born Reckless is a 1930 American pre-Code crime film directed by John Ford and staged by Andrew Bennison from a screenplay written by Dudley Nichols based on the novel Louis Beretti. The film starred Edmund Lowe, Catherine Dale Owen and Marguerite Churchill.

== Plot ==
Born Reckless (1930)

A gangster, Louis Beretti, gets caught involved in a jewelry heist and taken to see the judge. The war has begun and hoping to use the publicity to get re-elected, the judge offers Louis and his two buddies, the choice of going to jail, or signing up to fight in the war — if they prove themselves, he will throw away their arrests.

Louis makes it home from the war (one of his buddies was killed), and opens up a night club downtown that becomes very successful. His employees are former members of his gang, and he maintains contact with "Big", still a gangster.

Louis falls for the sister of his buddy who was killed in the war, but she already has plans to marry. He tells her nevertheless, that if she ever needs him, she should call and he will come. When her baby is kidnapped (her husband is away), she does call for Louis and he realizes that the kidnapping has been done by "Big" and the gang. Louis goes to save the baby and confront those of the gang who have taken part in the kidnapping. Shots are exchanged.

After he returns the baby to his mother, Louis goes back to his nightclub where "Big" is waiting. They talk of old times though they realize they will need to shoot it out, which they do, firing at each other several times, point blank. The bar doors swing shut and partly hide the sight of Big dropping to the floor. Louis comes staggering out. He claims to be okay, although he leans on Bill. Bill tells Joe that Louis will be alright and to get them a drink, calling after him “Louis' bottle!” Louis smiles. Cut to The End over the city skyline and a brisk rendition of “The Caissons Go Rolling Along”.

== Cast ==
- Edmund Lowe as Louis Beretti
- Catherine Dale Owen as Joan Sheldon
- Frank Albertson as Frank Sheldon
- Marguerite Churchill as Rosa Beretti
- William Harrigan as Good News Brophy
- Lee Tracy as Bill O'Brien
- Warren Hymer as Big Shot
- Ilka Chase as High Society Customer at Beretti's
- Ferike Boros as Ma Beretti
- Paul Porcasi as Pa Beretti
- Ben Bard as Joe Bergman
- Eddie Gribbon as Bugs
- Mike Donlin as Fingy Moscovitz
- Paul Page as Ritzy Reilly
- Roy Stewart as District Attorney Cardigan
- Jack Pennick as Sergeant
- Ward Bond as Sergeant
- Yola d'Avril as French Girl
- Randolph Scott as Dick Milburn
- John Wayne as Soldier (uncredited)
- Pat Somerset as Duke
