= Judith Vosselli =

American actress (1895-1966)

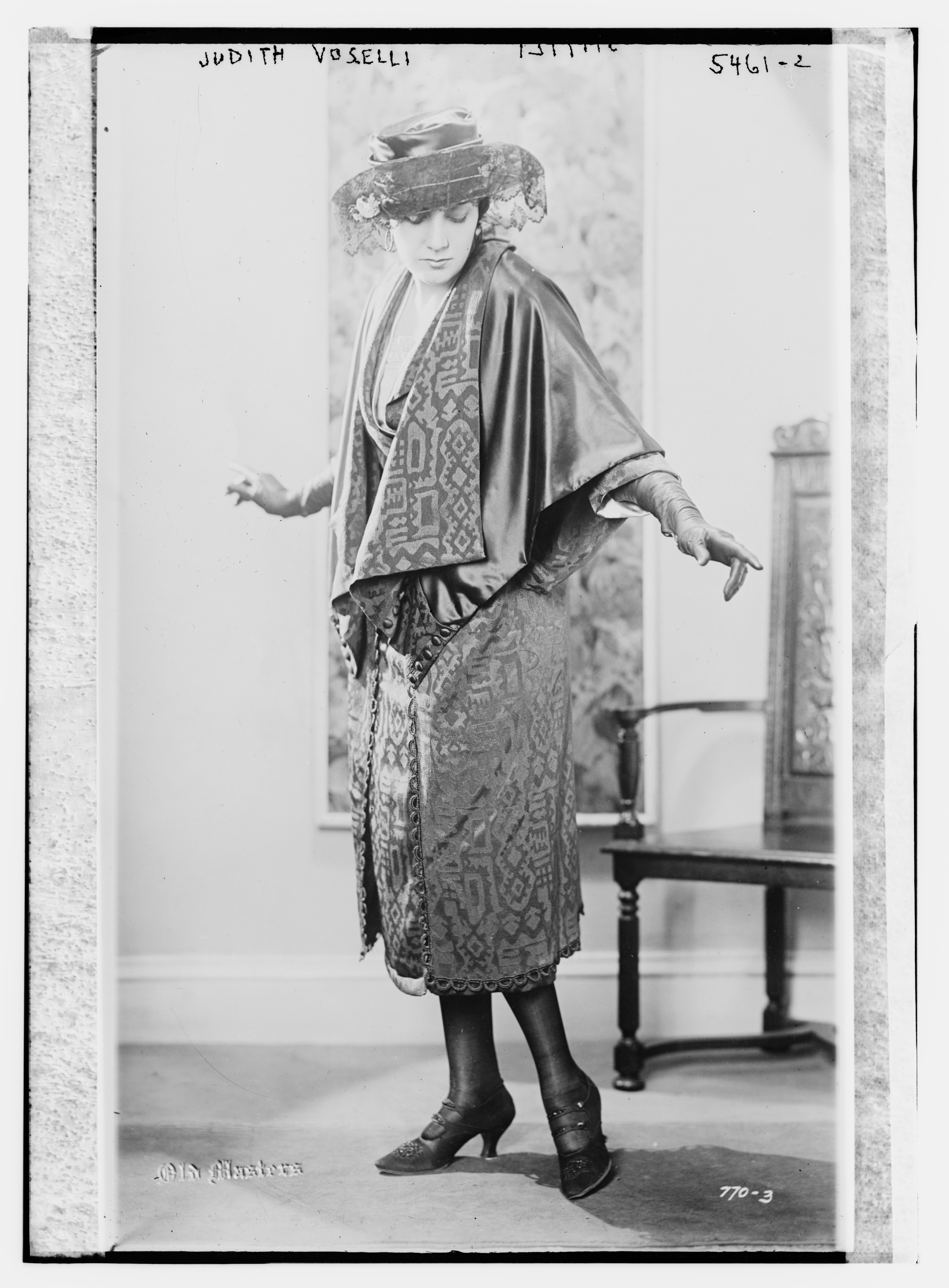
- Judith Vosselli
- Born: June 25, 1895; Barcelona, Catalonia, Spain
- Died: September 18, 1966 (aged 71); New York City, U.S.
- Occupation: Actress
- Years active: 1920–35
- Spouse: John Eshelman Lloyd (1918-1932, divorced)

Judith Vosselli (June 25, 1895 – September 18, 1966) was a Spanish-born actress who appeared on the American stage and screen during the 1920s and 1930s.

== Biography ==
Born in Barcelona, Vosselli made her American acting debut in the successful Broadway farce, Ladies' Night, which ran from 1920 to 1921. She appeared on Broadway in 5 more plays over the next five years, including the successful Merry Wives of Gotham (1924), and Louie the 14th in 1925.

She made the transition from stage to film in 1926, with a role in the silent film, The Prince of Tempters. Over the next ten years she appeared in over 20 feature films.

Some of the more notable films in which she appeared include: A Lady's Morals (1930), starring Grace Moore, Reginald Denny, and Wallace Beery; Inspiration, starring Greta Garbo and Robert Montgomery; the 1932 original sound production of Madame Butterfly, starring Sylvia Sidney and Cary Grant; and the 1935 classic, A Tale of Two Cities, starring Ronald Colman. Vosselli retired from acting after A Tale of Two Cities.

Vosselli was married to John Eshlman Lloyd from December 1918 until they were divorced on April 27, 1932.

Vosselli died on September 18, 1966, in New York City.

== Filmography ==
(Per AFI database)

- The Prince of Tempters (1926)
- Dance Magic (1927)
- The Awful Truth (1929)
- A Lady's Morals (1930)
- Reno (1930)
- The Rogue Song (1930)
- The Second Floor Mystery (1930)
- Sunny (1930)
- Today (1930)
- The Lady Who Dared (1931)
- Kiss Me Again (1931)
- The Gay Diplomat (1931)
- Inspiration (1931)
- Under 18 (1932)
- Madame Butterfly (1932)
- Love Is Like That (1933)
- The Great Flirtation (1934)
- City Park (1934)
- A Modern Hero (1934)
- A Tale of Two Cities (1935)
- The Big Broadcast of 1936 (1935)
- One New York Night (1935)
