= Strictly Unconventional =

1930 film

- Directed by: David Burton
- Screenplay by: Sylvia Thalberg; Frank Butler
- Based on: The Circle; 1921 play by W. Somerset Maugham
- Starring: Catherine Dale Owen; Paul Cavanagh; Tyrell Davis; Lewis Stone; Ernest Torrence
- Cinematography: William H. Daniels; Oliver T. Marsh
- Edited by: Margaret Booth
- Production company: Metro-Goldwyn-Mayer
- Distributed by: Metro-Goldwyn-Mayer
- Release date: May 3, 1930
- Running time: 55 minutes
- Country: United States
- Language: English

Strictly Unconventional is a 1930 American pre-Code drama film directed by David Burton, written by Sylvia Thalberg and Frank Butler, and starring Catherine Dale Owen, Paul Cavanagh, Tyrell Davis, Lewis Stone and Ernest Torrence. It was released on May 3, 1930, by Metro-Goldwyn-Mayer. It is based upon the 1921 play The Circle by W. Somerset Maugham.

== Plot ==
Strictly Unconventional (1930)

A young woman married into an aristocratic English family finds life with her husband dull and decides to elope with a Canadian. However her mother-in-law, who did something similar thirty years before, tries to prevent her.

== Cast ==
- Lewis Stone as Clive Champion-Cheney
- Catherine Dale Owen as Elizabeth
- Paul Cavanagh as Ted
- Ernest Torrence as Lord Porteous
- Tyrell Davis as Arnold Champion-Cheney
- Alison Skipworth as Lady Catherine Champion-Chene
- Mary Forbes as Mrs. Anna Shenstone
- Wilfred Noy as Butler
- William H. O'Brien as Footman
