= The Rogue Song =

1930 American film

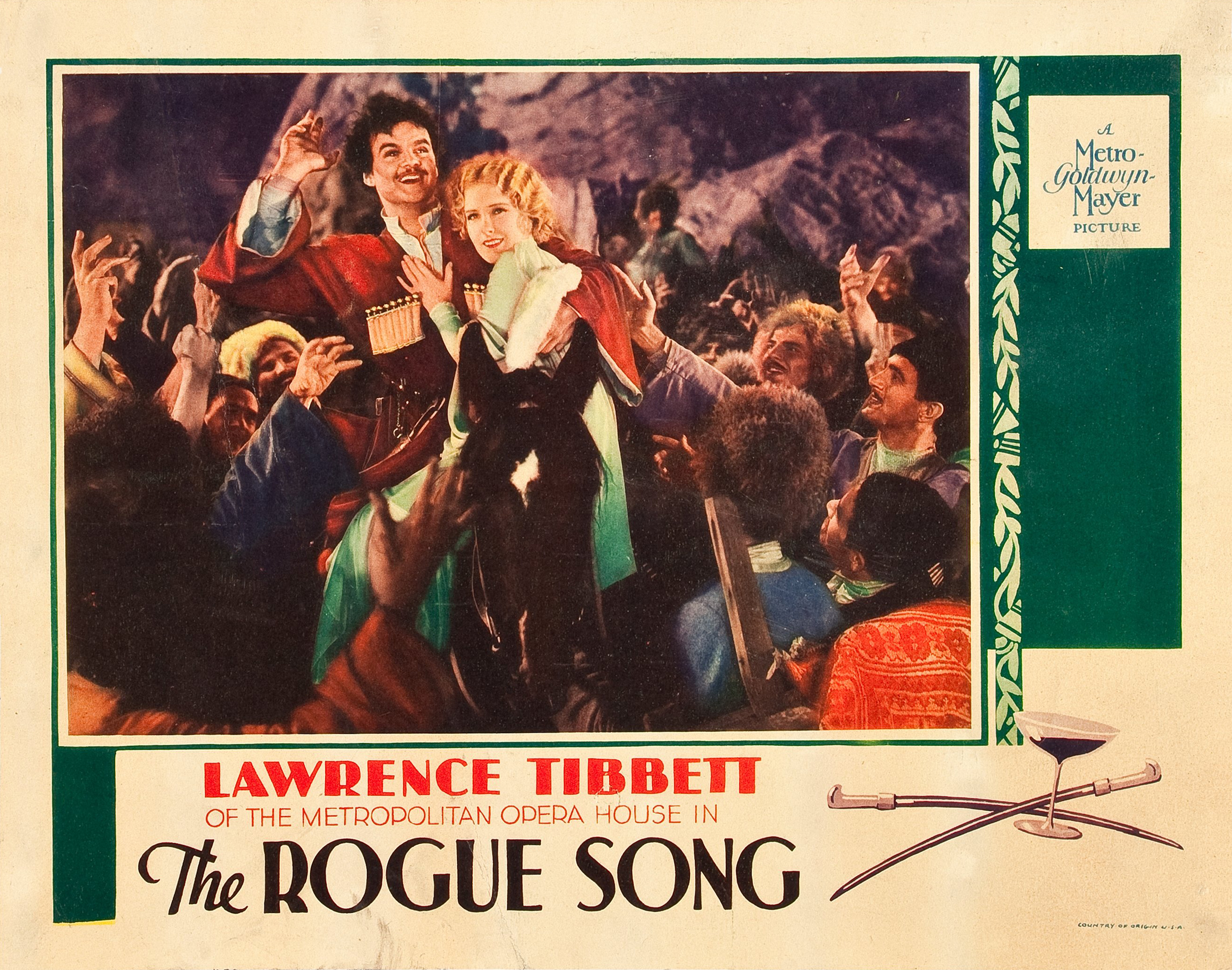
- Lobby card
- Directed by: Lionel Barrymore; Hal Roach (uncredited)
- Screenplay by: John Colton; Frances Marion; Wells Root (suggested by)
- Based on: Gipsy Love by Franz Lehár
- Produced by: Irving Thalberg
- Starring: Lawrence Tibbett; Stan Laurel; Oliver Hardy
- Cinematography: Percy Hilburn (*French); Charles Edgar Schoenbaum (Technicolor)
- Edited by: Margaret Booth
- Music by: Herbert Stothart; Franz Lehár; Clifford Grey; Dimitri Tiomkin (ballet)
- Color process: Technicolor Process 3
- Production company: Metro-Goldwyn-Mayer
- Distributed by: Loew's, Inc.
- Release dates: January 28, 1930 (NYC); February 17, 1930 (LA); May 10, 1930 (US)
- Running time: 103 minutes
- Country: United States
- Language: English
- Budget: $646,000 (final negative cost)
- Box office: $1,610,000 (worldwide)

The Rogue Song is a 1930 American pre-Code musical romance film that tells the story of a Russian bandit who falls in love with a princess, but takes his revenge on her when her brother rapes and kills his sister. The Metro-Goldwyn-Mayer production was directed by Lionel Barrymore and released in two versions, with and without sound. Hal Roach wrote and directed the Laurel and Hardy sequences and was not credited. The film stars Metropolitan Opera singer Lawrence Tibbett—who was nominated for an Academy Award for Best Actor for his performance—and Catherine Dale Owen. Laurel and Hardy were third-billed; their sequences were filmed at the last minute and interspersed throughout the film in an attempt to boost its potential box-office appeal.

This film, MGM's first all-talking Technicolor film, is partially lost as there are no known complete prints of this film. Fragments do exist.

== Plot ==
Among the insurgent tribes of the Caucasus Mountains is the one occupying the village of Kashiar, led by Yegor, the bandit-singer. His marvelous voice is the pride of his people, and his cheerful songs serve as a gallant defiance against the tyrannical and oppressive nobility. One afternoon, Yegor leads his men to the inn of Osman the Turk, where, merely passing through, they encounter the young Princess Vera Orloff and Countess Tatiana—whose conduct is the scandal of all Saint Petersburg. The Princess, unsettled by the bandit's passionate gaze, retires to her room, harboring within her heart a sudden interest in the stranger. Countess Tatiana offers Yegor a rich pearl necklace, hoping he will succumb to her charms; however, Yegor pockets the pearls and leaves the room. The Countess, enraged, summons Osman and offers him a sum of money to betray Yegor. Vera, having learned of the plot hatched against Yegor, seeks him out in the Thieves' Market and warns him of the danger. Moments later, Osman's corpse is discovered, his heart pierced by a dagger. Yegor heads toward his village. Upon arriving at his home, he finds his sister Nadja dead; from the lips of his elderly servant, he learns the tragic story. Nadja had met Prince Serge Orloff at an inn, and he—taking advantage of the young girl's innocence—had, through his audacity, brought shame upon Yegor's home. Unable to survive her dishonor, Nadja had taken her own life with her very own dagger. Yegor swears over his sister's corpse to exact a cruel vengeance. Accompanied only by Hassan and Azamat—his two lieutenants—he heads to the palace of Countess Tatiana, where he knows she is hosting a fête. Employing a ruse to outwit the household guards, he boldly presents himself to the Countess; though she is enraged by his audacity, Yegor implores her to allow him to sing a song he has composed expressly for her. Upon finishing, Yegor asks for permission to perform at the charity gala she has organized; Tatiana, captivated by the bandit, consents. That very night, Countess Tatiana introduces Yegor as her protégé. Among the guests is Princess Vera and Prince Serge. After the guests view a ballet number, Yegor appears on stage and sings wildly — a song in which he veiledly recounts the tragedy of his sister. Serge, though unaware that Yegor is the brother of his victim, realizes that he is fully apprised of his infamy, and withdraws. Once his song is finished—and while another ballet performance continues—Yegor heads toward the upper chambers; finding the Prince there, he engages him in a fierce hand-to-hand struggle and kills him, strangling him with his powerful fists. Vera bursts into the room, and upon seeing the corpse of her brother, she is on the verge of screaming in terror. Yegor stops her and explains the motive behind his vengeance. Vera furiously upbraids him: "Who are you—you wretched bandit—to take the life of a Prince Orloff for the sake of the honor of a vile bandit's wench!" ...Deeply wounded by these words, Yegor abducts the princess, vowing to make her pay dearly for them. Once back in his village, Yegor orders his men to strike camp and move to the other side of the mountains. During the journey, Yegor forces Vera to perform the heaviest labor, though she refuses to show any sign of faltering. Yegor is betrayed by Hassan who—lured by the promise of Vera's love—hands him over to the Cossacks. Yegor is flogged in Vera's presence, yet despite the pain, he sings a love song. Vera, driven mad with emotion, incites the soldiers to whip him even more cruelly, until—overcome by her own passion—she catches his collapsing body in her arms. The days that follow, during which Yegor recovers from his wounds—lovingly tended by the princess—pass like a dream for the two lovers. But the day finally arrives when Yegor, fully recovered, prepares to rejoin his own people; he bids farewell to his beloved, realizing that a Princess Orloff can never be the wife of a bandit captain. And as Vera collapses, sobbing, upon the threshold, Yegor walks away toward the mountains—his true world—singing the song of the bandits of the Caucasus.

== Cast ==
- Lawrence Tibbett as Yegor
- Catherine Dale Owen as Princess Vera
- Nance O'Neil as Princess Alexandra
- Judith Vosselli as Tatiana
- Ullrich Haupt as Prince Serge
- Elsa Alsen as Yegor's mother
- Florence Lake as Nadja
- Lionel Belmore as Ossman
- Wallace MacDonald as Hassan
- Kate Price as Petrovna
- H.A. Morgan as Frolov
- Burr McIntosh as Count Peter
- James Bradbury Jr. as Azamat
- Stan Laurel as Ali-Bek
- Oliver Hardy as Murza-Bek

== Songs ==
Sheet music for The Rogue Song

- "The Rogue Song" (sung by Lawrence Tibbett)
- "The Narrative" (sung by Lawrence Tibbett)
- "Love Comes Like a Bird on the Wing" (sung by Lawrence Tibbett)
- "The White Dove" (sung by Lawrence Tibbett)
- "Swan Ballet" (played by studio orchestra)
- "Once in the Georgian Hills" (sung by Lawrence Tibbett)
- "When I'm Looking at You" (sung by Lawrence Tibbett)

== Laurel and Hardy ==
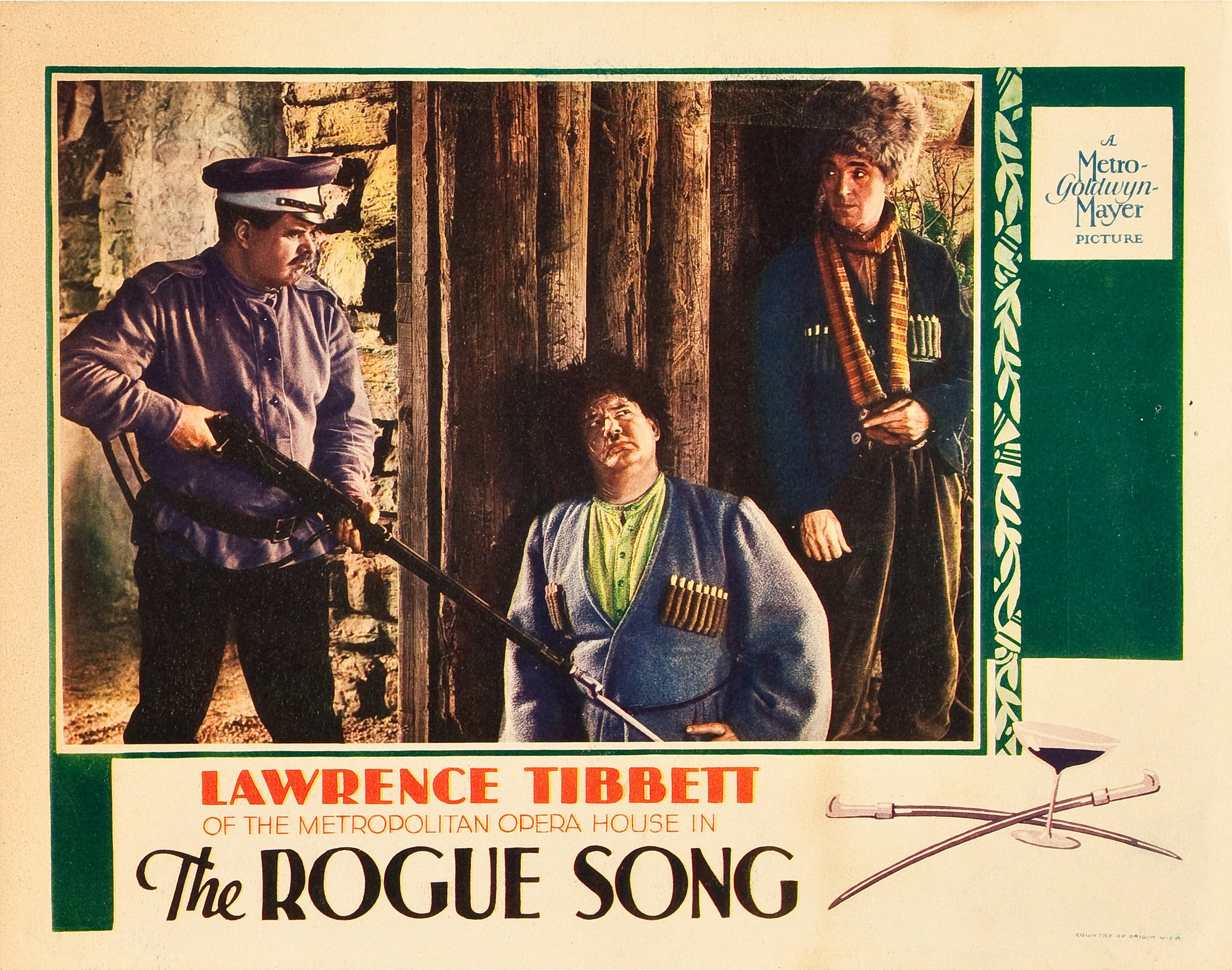
Lobby card for The Rogue Song featuring Oliver Hardy and Stan Laurel

There were eight comic episodes throughout the film in which Laurel and Hardy appeared. One of these has survived on film. In this scene, there is a storm and a tent is blown away revealing Stan and Oliver. They try to sleep without any cover. A bear enters a cave. Stan and Oliver decide to seek shelter in the cave and, because it is so dark, they cannot see the bear. Oliver thinks that Stan is wearing a fur coat. The bear begins to growl. Stan and Oliver flee.

Another segment, in which Laurel swallows a bee, has also survived on the trailer to the film, which has survived almost intact.

== Production ==
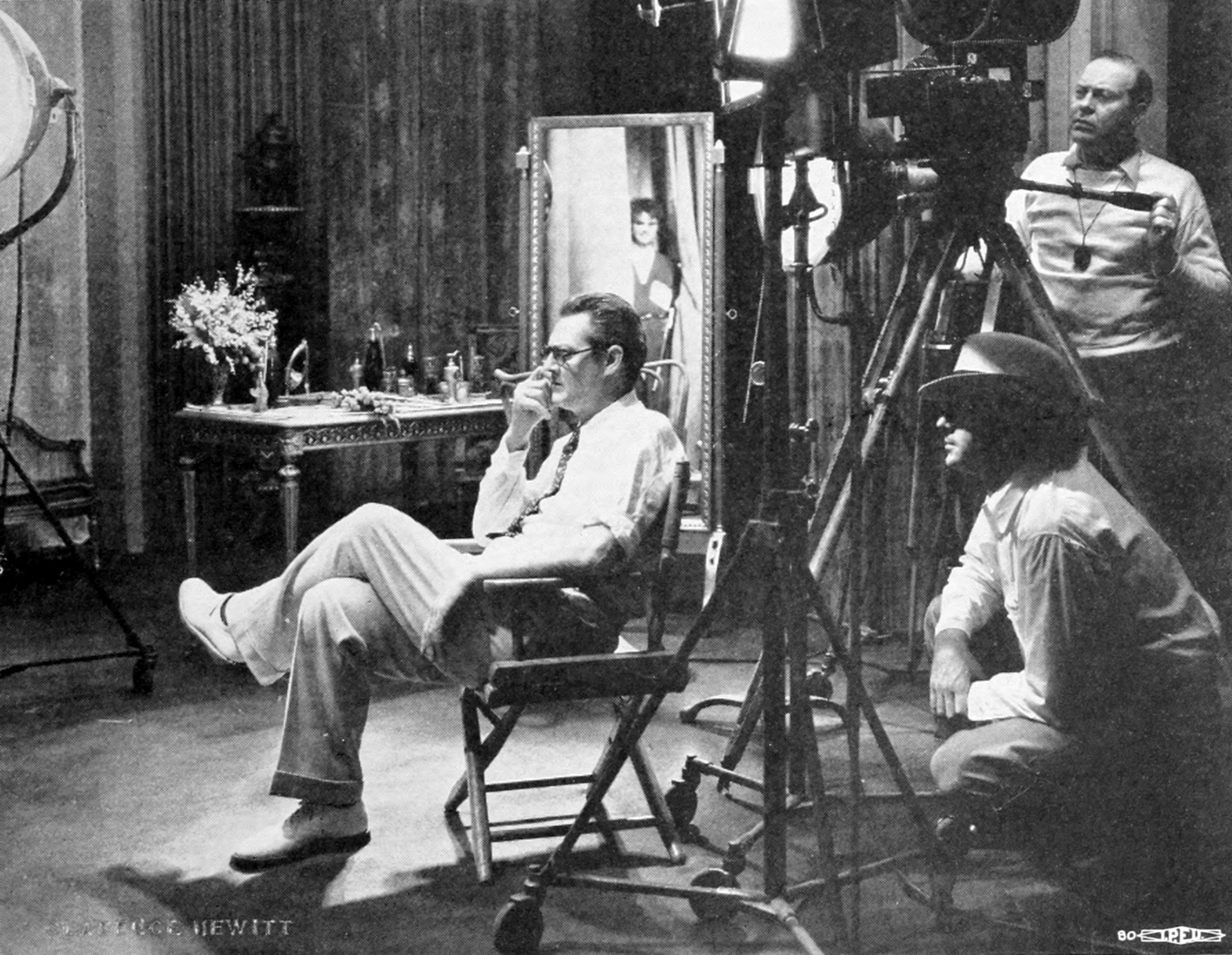
Lionel Barrymore directing The Rogue Song. Lawrence Tibbett reflected in mirror.

The film is MGM's first all-talking, all-color (Technicolor) production. It was also the screen debut of Lawrence Tibbett, a world-renowned star of the Metropolitan Opera. The film is notable today as Laurel and Hardy's only appearance in a color feature film (all of their feature films before and after were shot in black-and-white; their only other professionally shot color film was the wartime short The Tree in a Test Tube), although they were only minor players in the film.

The film was adapted from the score of the operetta Gipsy Love, with a new story by Robert Bodanzky and A. M. Willner and only "a little" of the music in Franz Lehár's score.

Production was supervised by Paul Bern, and the anticipated 30-day shooting schedule began on August 29, 1929. The studio executives' response to the daily "rushes" was that the film was not working well and needed help. MGM borrowed Laurel and Hardy from Hal Roach, and after negotiations between Roach and Thalberg, Roach agreed to write and direct their scenes. The final film has eight scenes with the comedy duo. Principal photography ended on October 11.

== Release ==
The film premiered in Hollywood at Grauman's Chinese Theatre on January 17, 1930.

Although Laurel and Hardy were minor players in the film, opera star Lawrence Tibbett was virtually unknown in much of the United States. As a result, in many places the film was advertised as "Laurel & Hardy in The Rogue Song".

== Preservation status ==
Although the film is considered to be lost, as there are no known complete prints, some fragments have been found. A two and a half minute fragment that had been cut out of the film by a local projectionist was found in a bookstore in Cambridge, Massachusetts in 1981; it featured a comic segment with Laurel and Hardy hiding in a cave in which a bear has taken shelter. Another 500 foot piece, about 10 minutes long, which showed a ballet sequence by Albertina Rasch was found in Maine in 1998 and was restored by UCLA. Another reel of assorted clips is in the Czech Film Archive; it was screened at a convention in 1995. Another short fragment shows Lawrence Tibbett singing to Catherine Dale Owen as they are caught in a storm.

The film's trailer, which includes Laurel and Hardy, is extant except for the first 60 seconds, which were lost due to decomposition; the remainder was transferred to safety stock by UCLA. In the trailer, Tibbett sings "White Dove" to Owen. A short segment featuring the comics Laurel & Hardy is also seen in which Laurel has apparently swallowed a bee.

In addition to those film fragments, the complete soundtrack of the film and the trailer survived because it was re-recorded on Vitaphone disks for theaters that did not have optical sound systems, such as the Movietone system, which MGM usually utilized.

The estate of Lawrence Tibbett held a color copy of the entire Rogue Song for many years after his death. Tibbett liked the film and showed it frequently to his friends. The late Allan Jones was a regular visitor and friend and reportedly gained possession of the print, which his son Jack Jones destroyed because of nitrate film decomposition. Tibbett had recorded some of the songs from the film in studio recordings released by RCA Victor.

YouTube currently (November 2020) contains a reconstruction of the entire film, utilizing the complete soundtrack, the half hour or so of existing footage, and stills from the film.

MGM held the negative of reel four until early 1974.

== See also ==
- List of American comedy films
- Laurel and Hardy filmography
- List of rediscovered films
- List of early color feature films
- List of incomplete or partially lost films
