= Inspiration (1931 film) =

1931 film

- Directed by: Clarence Brown
- Written by: Gene Markey; Alphonse Daudet
- Produced by: Irving Thalberg
- Starring: Greta Garbo; Robert Montgomery; Lewis Stone; Marjorie Rambeau; Judith Vosselli
- Cinematography: William H. Daniels
- Edited by: Conrad A. Nervig
- Distributed by: Metro-Goldwyn-Mayer
- Release date: January 31, 1931 (United States)
- Running time: 74 minutes
- Country: United States
- Language: English

Inspiration is a 1931 American pre-Code Metro-Goldwyn-Mayer romantic melodrama film adapted by Gene Markey from the Alphonse Daudet novel Sappho (1884). The film stars Greta Garbo, Robert Montgomery, Lewis Stone and Marjorie Rambeau. It was directed by Clarence Brown and produced by Irving Thalberg. The cinematography was performed by William H. Daniels, the art direction by Cedric Gibbons and the costume design by Adrian.

== Plot ==
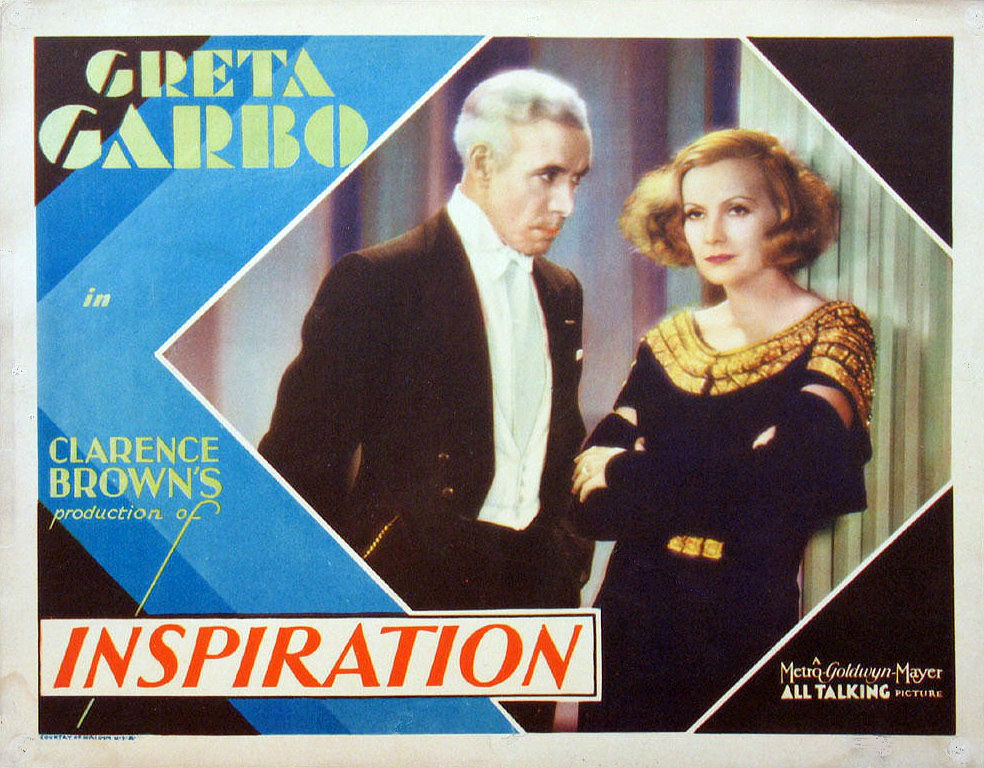
Lobby card for the film

Yvonne Valbret is a Parisian kept woman who poses as an artist's model. She falls in love with a young student of foreign diplomacy, André Montell. When André learns of her past and her multiple lovers, he leaves her. But finding Yvonne living in poverty when their paths cross again, he pays for her to live in his country cottage outside Paris and they engage in a platonic relationship. He soon reveals his intent to marry another woman as Yvonne begs him not to desert her. André eventually realizes that he loves Yvonne and decides to choose love over career. When he comes to the cottage to tell her, he is met by one of Yvonne's old lovers pleading with her to return to him. She immediately decides to marry André, but fearing that their relationship will ruin his career, she chooses her old lover and writes André a farewell note while he is sleeping.

== Cast ==
- Greta Garbo as Yvonne Valbret
- Robert Montgomery as Andre Montell
- Lewis Stone as Raymond Delval
- Marjorie Rambeau as Lulu
- Judith Vosselli as Odette
- Beryl Mercer as Marthe, Yvonne's maid
- John Miljan as Henry Coutant, the sculptor
- Edwin Maxwell as Uncle Julian Montell
- Oscar Apfel as M. Vignaud
- Joan Marsh as Madeleine Dorety
- Zelda Sears as Aunt Pauline
- Karen Morley as Liane Latour
- Gwen Lee as Gaby
- Paul McAllister as Jouvet
- Arthur Hoyt as Gavarni
- Richard Tucker as Galand

== Reception ==
The film earned approximately $1,127,000 in its worldwide distribution, resulting in a $286,000 profit for MGM.
