= Catherine Dale Owen =

American actress

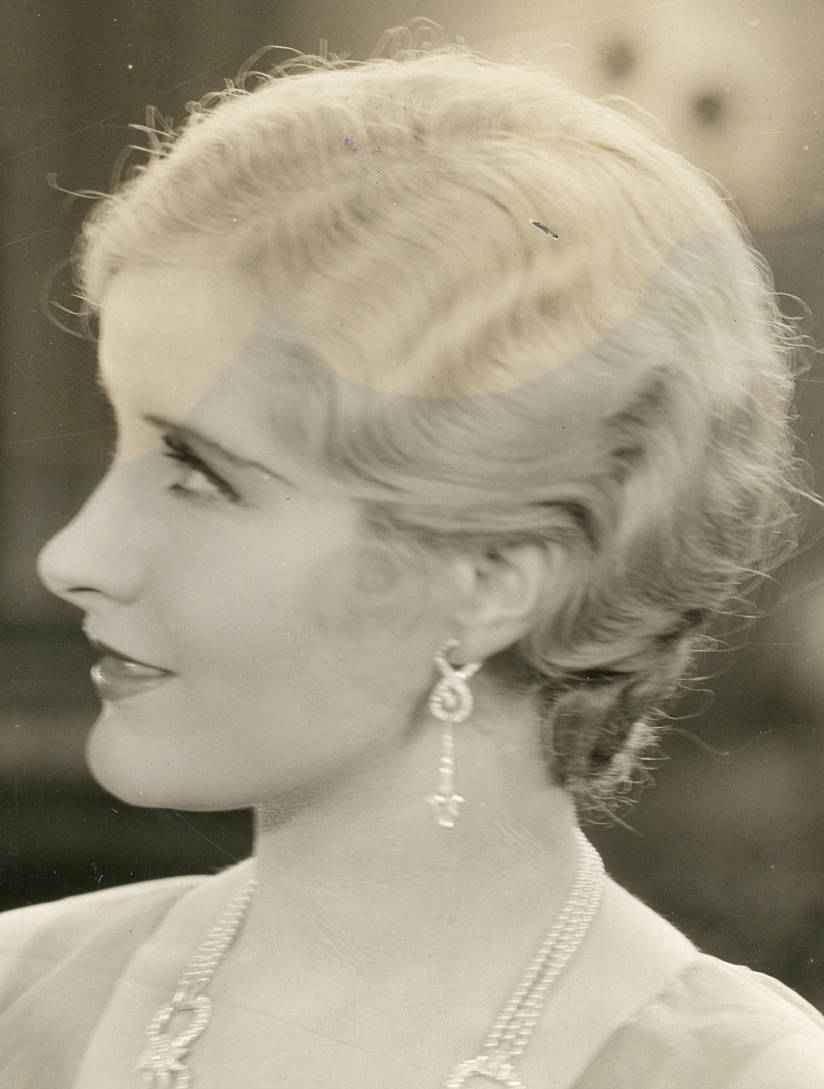
- Owen in 1930
- Born: July 28, 1900; Louisville, Kentucky, U.S.
- Died: September 7, 1965 (aged 65); New York City, U.S.
- Resting place: Old Tennent Cemetery
- Education: American Academy of Dramatic Arts
- Occupation: Actress
- Years active: 1920–1935
- Spouses: Milton F. Davis, Jr. (m. 1934; div. 1937) Homer P. Metzger (m. 1937–1965)
- Children: 1

Catherine Dale Owen (July 28, 1900 – September 7, 1965) was an American stage and film actress.

== Early life ==
Catherine Dale Owen was born in Louisville, Kentucky. She attended private school in Philadelphia and Bronxville, New York, before attending the American Academy of Dramatic Arts in New York City.

== Career ==
First discovered by Laura MacGillivray, the wife of Actors Equity president Frank Gillmore, Owen appeared on Broadway in the 1920s through early 1930s in productions including The Mountain Man, The Whole Town's Talking, Trelawny of the Wells, The Love City and The Play's the Thing. In 1925, Owen was acclaimed as one of the ten most beautiful women in the world.

Owen made her film debut as Princess Orsolini opposite John Gilbert's Captain Kovacs in the 1929 film His Glorious Night.

In 1930, Owen starred in Lawrence Tibbett's film debut, The Rogue Song and also with Edmund Lowe in Born Reckless. Owen appeared in her final film, Defenders of the Law in 1931. She retired from acting in 1935.

== Personal life ==
Owen married Milton F. Davis Jr., son of Brigadier General Milton F. Davis, in 1934. The marriage ended in divorce in March 1937. On June 5, 1937, Owen married advertising executive Homer P. Metzger in New York City. The couple had one son, Robert Owen Metzger, born in October 1939.

Owen's likeness was drawn in caricature by Alex Gard for Sardi's, the New York City theater district restaurant. The picture is now part of the collection at the New York Public Library.

== Death ==
On September 3, 1965, Owen suffered a stroke at her New York City home. She was taken to Lenox Hill Hospital where she slipped into a coma. She died there on September 7 at the age of 65.

== Filmography ==
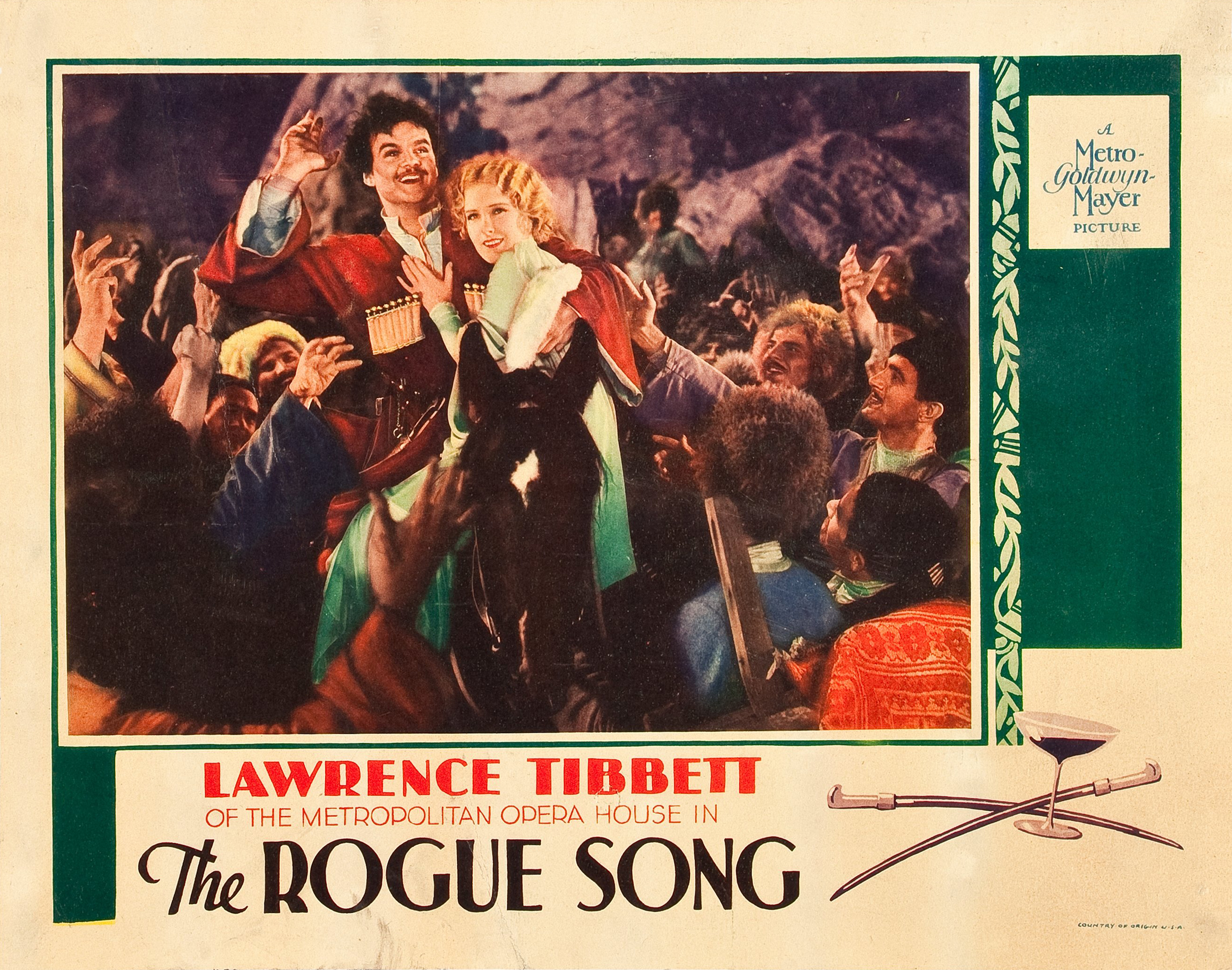
Lobby card for The Rogue Song (1930)

Year	Title	Role
1927	The Forbidden Woman	
1929	His Glorious Night	Princess Orsolini
1930	Such Men Are Dangerous	Elinor Kranz
1930	Strictly Unconventional	Elizabeth
1930	The Rogue Song	Princess Vera
1930	Born Reckless	Joan Sheldon
1930	Today	Eve Warner
1931	Behind Office Doors	Ellen May Robinson
1931	Defenders of the Law	Alice Randall

== See also ==
- List of caricatures at Sardi's restaurant
