= Tyrell Davis =

British actor (1902–1970)

- Born: Harry Davis; 29 September 1902; Surbiton, Surrey, England
- Died: 8 December 1970 (aged 68); London, England
- Other names: Tyrrell Davis; Harry Davis
- Occupation: Actor
- Years active: 1925-1938
- Spouse: Lota Cheek (divorced)
- Father: Sir Robert Henry Davis

Tyrell Davis (1902–1970) was a British film actor, Cambridge educated, who appeared on the West End and Broadway stage, as well as in British and American films.

"In George Cukor's Our Betters (1933), Tyrell Davis played one of the swishiest homosexuals of them all."

Tyrell Davis was born on September 29, 1902 in Surbiton, Surrey, England as Harry Davis. He was an actor, known for Strictly Unconventional (1930), Let Us Be Gay (1930) and Paid (1930). He was married to Lota Cheek.

He died on December 8, 1970 in London, England.

== Filmography ==
- Lucky in Love (1929)
- Mother's Boy (1929)
- His Glorious Night (1929)
- Strictly Unconventional (1930)
- Love in the Rough (1930)
- Let Us Be Gay (1930)
- Rain or Shine (1930)
- Prince of Diamonds (1930)
- The Dancers (1930)
- Paid (1930)
- The Magnificent Lie (1931)
- Parlor, Bedroom and Bath (1931)
- The Road to Singapore (1931)
- The Phantom of Paris (1931)
- God's Gift to Women (1931)
- Chances (1931)
- Murder at Midnight (1931)
- Temptation's Workshop (1932)
- The Unexpected Father (1932)
- Lady with a Past (1932)
- Lovers Courageous (1932)
- Call Her Savage (1932)
- Love in High Gear (1932)
- Our Betters (1933)
- Blind Adventure (1933)
- Pleasure Cruise (1933)
- Peg o' My Heart (1933)
- Dangerously Yours (1933)
- Designing Women (1934)
- Freedom of the Seas (1934)
- Smith's Wives (1935)
- All at Sea (1935)
- Under Proof (1936)
- Parisian Life (1936)
- Dinner at the Ritz (1937)
- The Green Cockatoo (1937)
- Strange Boarders (1938)
- Second Best Bed (1938)
