= David Burton (director) =

American film director

- Born: May 22, 1877; Odessa, Ukraine, Russian Empire
- Died: December 30, 1963 (aged 86); New York, New York; United States
- Occupation: Director
- Years active: 1930–1941 (film)

David Burton (1877–1963) was a Russian-born American film director of the 1930s and early 1940s. He had previously worked as a theater director. His films include Let's Fall in Love (1933) and The Melody Lingers On (1935).

== Selected filmography ==
- The Bishop Murder Case (1930)
- Free and Easy (1930)
- Strictly Unconventional (1930)
- Fighting Caravans (1931)
- Dancers in the Dark (1932)
- Brief Moment (1933)
- The Romantic Age (1934)
- Princess O'Hara (1935)
- The Melody Lingers On (1935)
- The Man Who Wouldn't Talk (1940)
- Manhattan Heartbeat (1940)

== Bibliography ==
- Everett Aaker. George Raft: The Films. McFarland, 2013.
