= Selena Fetter Royle =

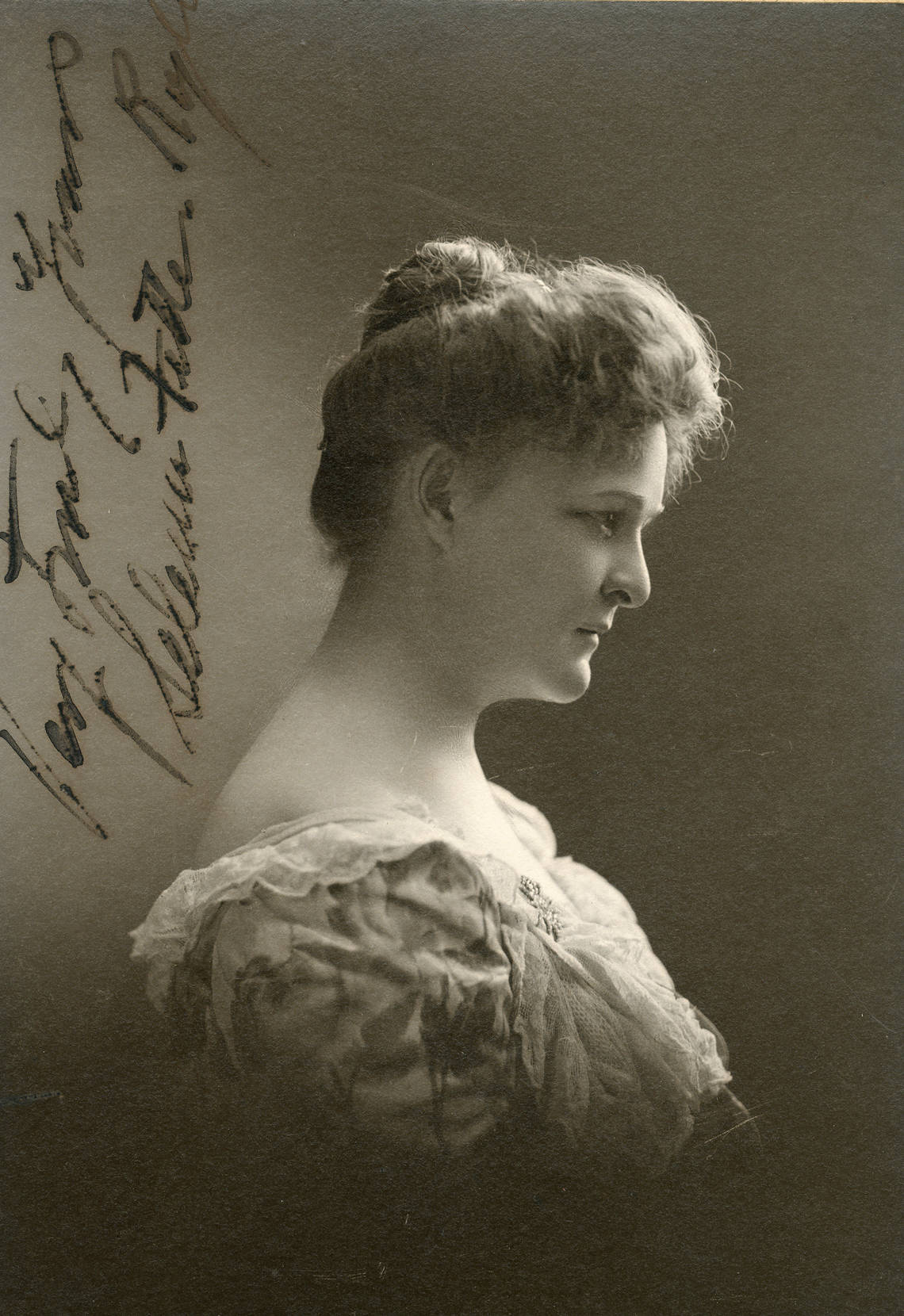
- Selena Fetter Royle, from a 1902 publicity photo
- Born: Selena Gray Fetter; April 12, 1860; Louisville, Kentucky, U.S.
- Died: May 10, 1955 (aged 95); Van Nuys, California, U.S.
- Occupation: Actress
- Spouse: Edwin Milton Royle
- Relatives: Earle Larrimore (son-in-law); Georges Renavent (son-in-law)

Selena Gray Fetter Royle (April 12, 1860 – May 10, 1955) was an American stage actress, active in the 1890s and 1900s. Her husband and daughters were also on the stage.

== Early life and education ==
Fetter was born in Louisville, Kentucky, the daughter of George Griffith Fetter and Catherine Ann Mercer Gray Fetter. Her sister Virginia Fetter married Civil War general Amos George Stickney.

== Career ==
Fetter's first roles were on the stage in Louisville, where she made her professional acting debut in 1881, starring in The Wife by James Sheridan Knowles. She appeared in Love's Sacrifice in Chicago in 1893, starred in The Tigress in 1888, and acted with Alexander Salvini in 1892. She was associated with Stuart Robson and William H. Crane on the vaudeville stage. Her Broadway credits included roles in her husband's comedies, Friends (1892), Captain Impudence (1897), My Wife's Husbands (1903), and The Other Girl (1903–1904). She also toured with Friends and Captain Impudence across the United States.

Fetter Royle was known for her ability to fall on stage, in a gown, sometimes to "ghastly effect". "Ladies used to scream in the audience simultaneously with my 'dull thud', and inquiries would be kindly sent to the dressing room concerning my physical condition," she told an 1895 interviewer. When she appeared in San Francisco, there was a fad among young women, trying to imitate Fetter Royle's falls.

== Personal life and legacy ==
Fetter married actor and playwright Edwin Milton Royle in 1892. They had two daughters, Josephine and Selena, who both became actresses. The family lived in Darien, Connecticut, after 1910. Her husband died in 1942, and she died in 1955, at the age of 95, in Van Nuys, California. The Metropolitan Museum of Art holds a tobacco card featuring Fetter as a young actress.
