= The Squaw Man (1918 film) =

1918 film

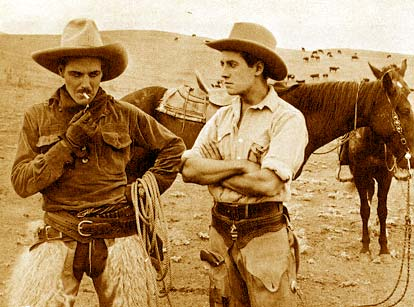
- Film still with Jack Holt and Elliott Dexter
- Directed by: Cecil B. DeMille
- Written by: Beulah Marie Dix (scenario, story)
- Based on: The Squaw Man; 1905 play by Edwin Milton Royle
- Produced by: Cecil B. DeMille
- Starring: Elliott Dexter
- Cinematography: King D. Gray; Alvin Wyckoff
- Edited by: Anne Bauchens
- Production company: Famous Players–Lasky Corporation
- Distributed by: Artcraft Pictures Corporation
- Release date: December 15, 1918
- Running time: 6 reels
- Country: United States
- Languages: Silent; English intertitles

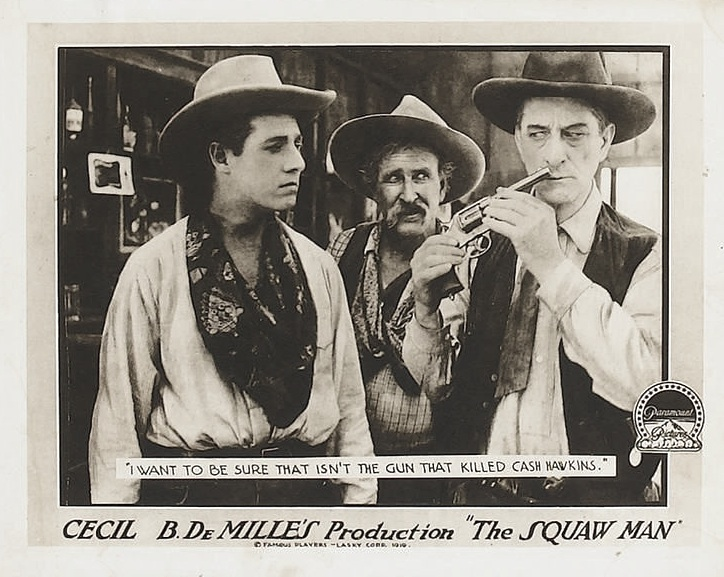
Lobby card

The Squaw Man is a 1918 American silent Western film directed by Cecil B. DeMille. It is a remake of DeMille's 1914 film of the same name, which is based upon a 1905 play by Edwin Milton Royle. The film was reportedly made as an experiment to prove DeMille's theory that a good film is based on a good story. It cost $40,000 to make and grossed $350,000. It would be remade again by DeMille in 1931.

== Plot ==
As described in a film magazine, Jim Wynnegate, a young Englishman, assumes the guilt for the embezzlement of trust funds that were lost in speculation by his cousin Henry. He embarks to the United States and settles in the west, where he buys a ranch. In a quarrel with Cash Hawkins, Jim is saved from death by Naturich, a young Indian woman, who shoots the outlaw. He marries her out of gratitude and becomes known as the squaw man. Soon a son is born, and five years pass. His cousin Henry dies and Jim is summoned back to England to assume the title Earl of Kerhill, he having been exonerated by the deathbed confession of his cousin. He decides to send his son home to England, and the parting between the mother and son is poignant. Naturich, about to be arrested for the killing of Hawkins, commits suicide while huddled among her child's playthings.

== Cast ==
- Elliott Dexter as Jim Wynnegate
- Ann Little as Naturich
- Katherine MacDonald as Diana, Henry's Wife
- Theodore Roberts as Big Bill
- Jack Holt as Cash Hawkins
- Thurston Hall as Henry, Jim's Cousin
- Tully Marshall as Sir John Applegate
- Herbert Standing as Dean Of Trentham
- Edwin Stevens as Bud Hardy
- Helen Dunbar as Dowager Countess
- Winter Hall as Fletcher
- Julia Faye as Lady Mabel
- Noah Beery as Tabywana
- Pat Moore as Little Hal
- Jim Mason as Grouchy (credited as James Mason)
- Monte Blue as Happy
- William Brunton as Shorty
- Charles Ogle as Bull Cowan
- Guy Oliver as Kid Clarke
- Clarence Geldart as Solicitor

== Reception ==
Like many American films of the time, The Squaw Man was subject to restrictions and cuts by city and state film censorship boards. For example, the Chicago Board of Censors required a cut, in Reel 4, of the intertitle "By God, you've got to make her happy", the shooting of Cash Hawkins, the shooting of the man in an ambush, and the modification of the plot by the transposition of the scenes of baby moccasins, etc., to indicate that the marriage had taken place prior to when any intimacy between Naturich and Jim Wynnegate had taken place, which would include placing the intertitle "Send for the Justice of the Peace" before the moccasin scene.

== Preservation ==
Incomplete 16 mm and 35 mm prints of The Squaw Man are held by the George Eastman Museum.

== See also ==
- The House That Shadows Built (1931 promotional film by Paramount)
