= The Second Man (play) =

1927 play by S. N. Behrman

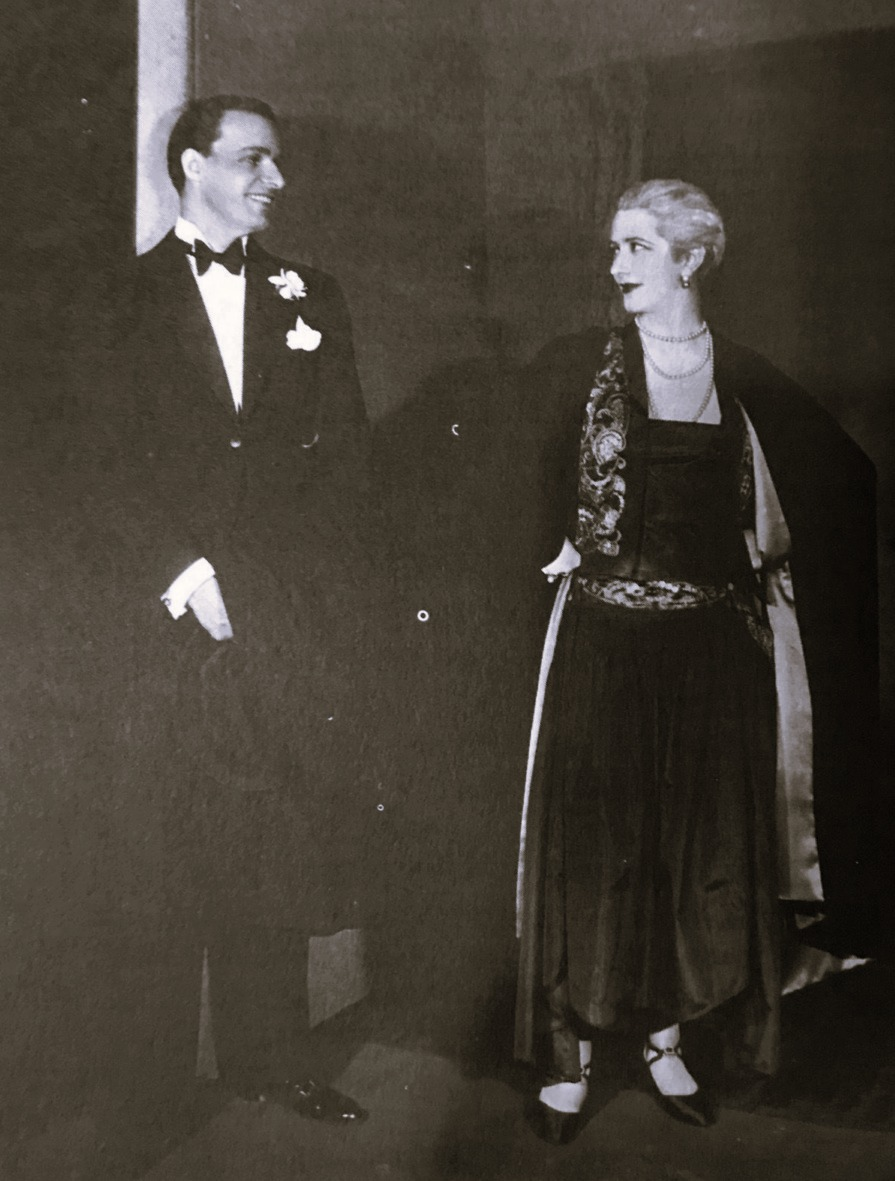
- Alfred Lunt and Lynn Fontanne
- Original language: English
- Written by: S. N. Behrman
- Based on: That Second Man by S. N. Behrman
- Subject: Expediency overcomes romance
- Genre: Comedy
- Setting: An apartment on West 56th Street in Manhattan

Premiere
- Date: April 11, 1927 (US); January 24, 1928 (UK)
- Place: Guild Theatre (US); Playhouse Theatre (UK)
- Directed by: Philip Moeller (US); Basil Dean (UK)

The Second Man is a 1927 play by S. N. Behrman, which he based on his own 1919 short story, That Second Man. It is a three-act comedy, with four scenes, one setting and four characters. The action of the play takes place within 24 hours time. The story concerns a short story writer of irregular output who chooses a wealthy widow he likes over a beautiful but poor young woman he loves. The title comes from a phrase in a letter Lord Leighton wrote, revealing a second man within himself.

The play was produced by the Theatre Guild's Philip Moeller, who also staged it, with scenic design by Jo Mielziner. The Second Man initially starred Alfred Lunt, with Lynn Fontanne, Margalo Gilmore, and Earle Larimore. It premiered in Manhattan during April 1927 and ran through to October, ending after 178 performances. It had a separate West End production starting in January 1928, starring Noël Coward, supported by Raymond Massey, Zena Dare, and Ursula Jeans, which ran for three months.

The Second Man was adapted for a 1930 RKO early sound film called He Knew Women.

== Characters ==
Characters are listed in order of appearance within their scope.

Lead

- Clark Storey is 31, a dilettante writer; voluble, keen, frank, selfish, fond of comfort and self-aware.

Supporting

- Mrs. Kendall Frayne is 35, a wealthy widow, who is jealous at times but has put up with Clark for three years.
- Austin Lowe is 29, a chemist friend of Clark; rich, talented, dull, and inarticulate, in love with Monica.
- Monica Grey is 20, restless, duplicitous, and desperate; she loves an ideal Clark that is only part of him.

Walk on

- Albert is a waiter from the restaurant in the apartment hotel.

== Synopsis ==
Act I (Clark Storey's apartment hotel on West 56th Street. Late afternoon.) Clark has kept Kendall waiting for an hour while he has a late lunch with an English novelist. Kendall is fully aware he takes her for granted, and is jealous of Monica when she phones. Clark assures her Austin and Monica are engaged, egged on by her mother, from an impoverished gentility, who wants a rich son-in-law. Clark invites Kendall to dine with him, and she goes home to change, but first writes Clark a check for $500. Clark orders dinner for two from the restaurant downstairs. Austin bursts in, forlorn because Monica has dumped him. Aware Monica is on her way, Clark sends Austin out with instructions to come back in 20 minutes. He phones Kendall and suggests they eat out instead of at his place. Monica storms in, determined to force Clark's acceptance of their mutual love. Clark is physically tempted, but his second man overrules him. He promotes Austin, but Monica despairs of his company, finding his conversation dull. When Austin returns, followed by a pre-arranged phone call from Kendall, Monica realizes she has been tricked. Austin is elated to see her and readily agrees to dine in. Clark rushes out, ignoring Monica's sulk. (Curtain)

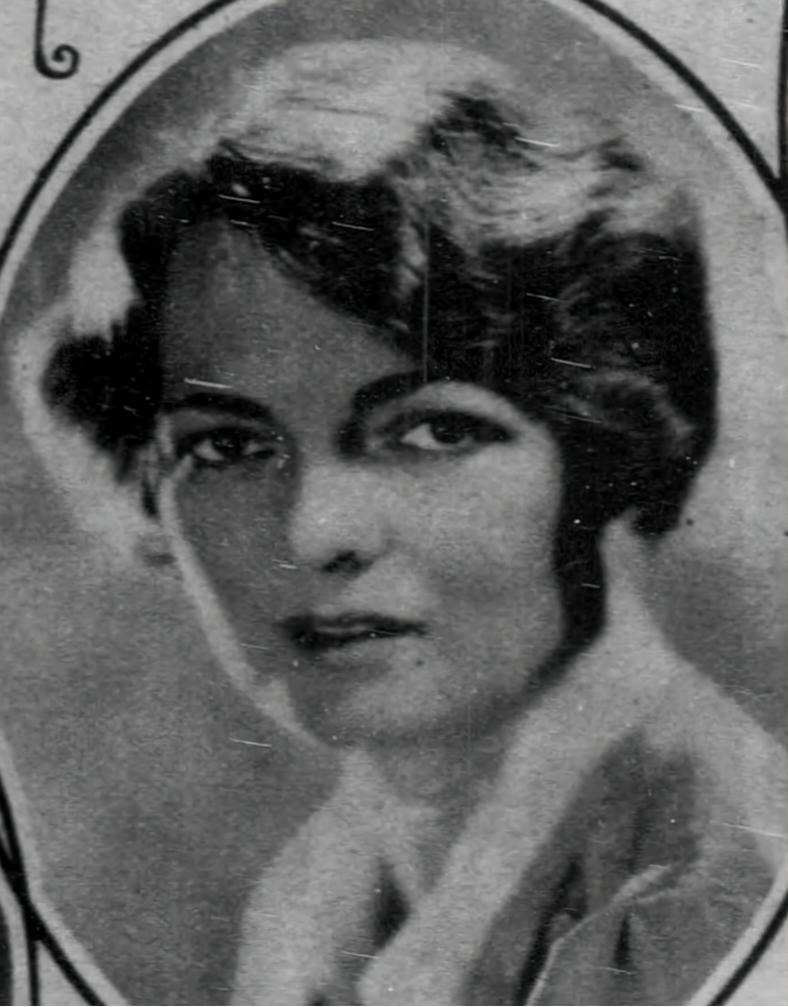
Margalo Gillmore

Act II (Scene 1:Same as Act I. That same evening, after dinner.) Austin and Monica have finished dining in Clark's apartment and are having trouble connecting. A waiter enters to provide coffee and remove the dinner items. Austin is more talkative than usual and Monica relaxes her attitude towards him. He suggests an outing: "We could go to the opera. Its Götterdämmerung. That would be fun, wouldn't it?" While they talk, Monica notices the $500 check; Austin repeats what Clark told him, it was payment for a short story. But Monica notices what Austin did not: the signature. Angered and disillusioned, she crumples the check and throws it on the floor. Austin, stooping to pick it up, now also sees Mrs. Frayne wrote it. As they discuss Clark's relationship to Kendall, he returns. Kendall has suggested the foursome go clubbing; he tells them to go home and dress for an evening out. But Monica foxes Austin and returns to Clark alone. They spar about Kendall and Austin, until Clark can persuade her to go. (Quick curtain)

(Scene 2:Same as Act I. Eleven o'clock that same night.) Kendall has had two cases of Champagne delivered to Clark's apartment. She and Austin wait for Clark to finish dressing and Monica to arrive. Austin spots Monica's scarf on the sofa and realizes she came back after leaving with him. He is sore at Clark, and rebukes Monica when she does arrive. Austin drinks rashly, while Kendall begins sniping at Clark. As the four of them sip the drink, they discuss which clubs to visit. Having earlier threatened to tell newspapers they are engaged, Monica now plays a dirty trick. She announces in front of Kendall and Austin that she is pregnant with Clark's baby. Clark is aghast; he can see that Kendall and Austin believe her, though no such relations ever occurred. Kendall is appalled and screams at Clark, Austin drinks champagne even faster. Clark tries to force Monica to recant but she is adamant. Kendall and Austin storm out, at which Clark reveals himself fully to Monica. Yes, he loves her, but his desire for a comfortable life outweighs any romantic urge: they will not marry nor have an affair. (Curtain)

Act III (Same as Act I. Afternoon of the next day.) Unused to alcohol, Austin has wandered all night and into the next day. He stumbles into Clark's apartment, pulls out a revolver and after some recriminations shoots at him. Unfazed, Clark, after ducking at the opportune time, takes the gun away from Austin and sends him off to the bedroom for a nap. Kendall saunters in, smells the gunpowder, and is enlightened by Clark. She is unmoved, her sympathy with Austin. She is planning to go abroad and has come to say goodbye. Clark tries to stall her, but is summoned away by Austin calling out. At the door Kendall runs into a chastened Monica, who tries to convince the older woman she was lying. Kendall pities her: "You're worse off than I am, really. You're in love with a man who doesn't exist. I am in love with one who does". She goes out, and Clark tries to assimilate the impact. Surprisingly, Monica has lost all feeling for Clark; she now realizes what he knew all along, that Austin would be best for her. Overhearing this confession, Austin again proposes, is accepted and they depart. Alone, Clark goes to the telephone and rings up Kendall. He persuades her the youngsters have finally cleaved together and amuses her by declaring any baby born will not bear the slightest resemblance to him. (Curtain)

== Original production ==
=== Background ===
“...For, together with, and as it were behind, so much pleasurable emotion, there is always that other strange second man in me, calm, critical, observant, unmoved, blasé, odious.” – Lord Leighton: Letter to his sister

This was the first solo play by S. N. Behrman, his earlier unsuccessful efforts having been in collaboration with Kenyon Nicholson. It was based on his short story That Second Man, published in the November 1919 issue of The Smart Set. By Behrman's own recounting, the play was a hard sell, turned down by every producer in New York. Behrman's literary agent Harold Freedman persisted, however, and Theresa Helburn, whom Behrman called Terry, persuaded the other Theatre Guild board members (Note: Besides Helburn, in 1927 this included Lawrence Langner, Lee Simonson, Philip Moeller, Helen Westley, and Maurice Wertheim.) to buy it. Behrman had asked Maurice Wertheim for the Lunts, (Note: Husband and wife team Alfred Lunt and Lynn Fontanne, who starred in a number of Guild productions during 1926-1927.) but had to settle for having them just seven weeks, after which they planned to go on a long European vacation. Lee Simonson told him that Philip Moeller would be directing and Jo Mielziner designing the sets, while Lawrence Langner suggested Margalo Gillmore for the ingenue role, which delighted Behrman. Terry Helburn, whom Behrman said really ran the Guild, told him to be in Manhattan for rehearsals in mid-March 1927.

=== Cast ===
From its premiere, the production alternated weekly with a revival of Pygmalion at the Guild Theater until June 6, 1927, when it took over sole possession of that venue. During this time, the cast of The Second Man performed on their off weeks in other Theatre Guild productions.

The cast from Broadway premiere through the closing.
| Role | Actor | Dates | Notes and sources |
|---|---|---|---|
| Clark Storey | Alfred Lunt | Apr 11, 1927 - Jul 08, 1927 | |
| Clark Storey | Earle Larimore | Jul 09, 1927 - Oct 08, 1927 | Larimore took over the Clark Storey role when Alfred Lunt went on vacation. |
| Mrs. Kendall Frayne | Lynn Fontanne | Apr 11, 1927 - Apr 30, 1927 | Fontanne only accepted this role to support her husband Alfred Lunt, who wanted to play Clark Storey. |
| Mrs. Kendall Frayne | Beatrice Terry | May 09, 1927 - May 25, 1927 | Terry took over while Lynn Fontanne recovered from an appendectomy. |
| Mrs. Kendall Frayne | Lynn Fontanne | May 26, 1927 - Jul 08, 1927 | |
| Mrs. Kendall Frayne | Emily Stevens | Jul 09, 1927 - Oct 08, 1927 | Stevens took over when Fontanne went on vacation to Europe with Alfred Lunt. |
| Austin Lowe | Earle Larimore | Apr 11, 1927 - Jul 08, 1927 | |
| Austin Lowe | Donald MacDonald | Jul 09, 1927 - Oct 08, 1927 | Married to actress Ruth Hammond; he should not be confused with the older Donald MacDonald. |
| Monica Grey | Margalo Gilmore | Apr 11, 1927 - Oct 08, 1927 | |
| Albert | Edward Hartford | Apr 11, 1927 - Oct 08, 1927 | |

=== Broadway premiere and reception ===
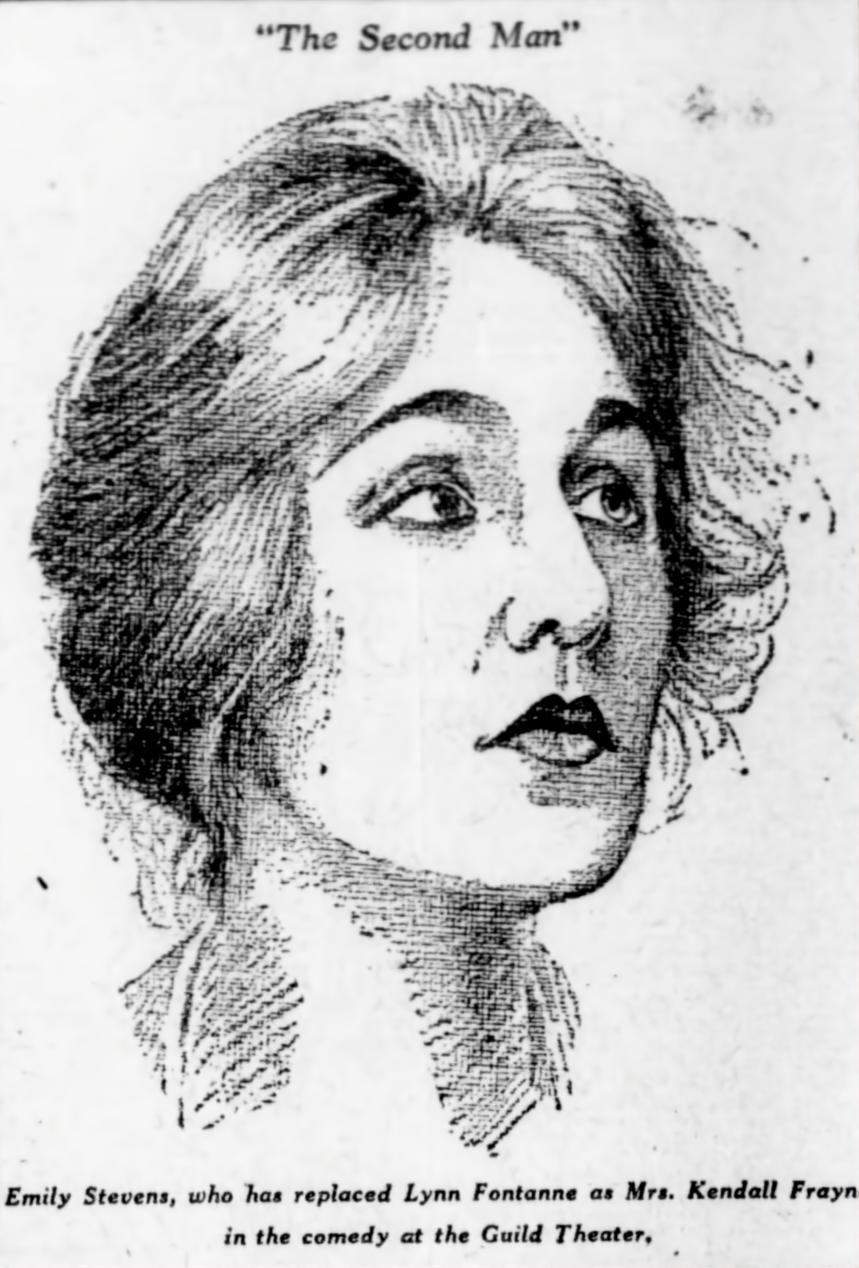

The production had its Broadway premiere at the Guild Theatre on April 11, 1927. Arthur Pollock called it a "calm, cool, urbane comedy", said it was well-acted and staged, though he thought director Philip Moeller should have sped the pace up. He was optimistic for S. N. Behrman's future as a playwright, saying he could "write comedy without a wisecrack which is an achievement". Rowland Field pointed out the Theatre Guild was having the most successful of its nine seasons with this first play by S. N. Behrman, "a thoroughly delightful and epigrammatic native comedy... filled with repartee that fairly crackles across the footlights". The reviewer for the Brooklyn Standard Union said the play had everything but a story: "what you get when its all over is a beautiful, highly polished shell with no kernel".

Burns Mantle joined other critics in acknowledging an excellent first work by S. N. Behrman, giving their due to the four actors, of whom he felt Earle Larimore had the most difficult task as Austin Lowe, while Alfred Lunt could not ask for a more fitting role than the glib dilletante Clark Storey. Ray Harper called The Second Man "a brilliantly written comedy" and said: "Working throughout with only four main characters and one walk-on part, Mr. Behrman has juggled these people about with a deftness that is simply amazing". Brooks Atkinson also remarked on the story's thinness, calling it "a rather too sketchy comedy". He praised Behrman's easy command of dialogue and character, but judged the second and third act shocks of revelation and pistol shot theatrical and jarring. Atkinson also noted that as the first night performance ended, S. N. Behrman snuck out of the theater to avoid the public acclaim.

After finishing their performances on July 8, 1927, Alfred Lunt and Lynn Fontanne sailed for Europe, leaving their parts to Earle Larimore and Emily Stevens respectively, while Donald MacDonald took over Larimore's former part. Burns Mantle, who compiled an annual yearbook of the best plays performed in America, solicited the views of eleven fellow drama critics as to which were the ten best plays of the 1926-27 season. Saturday's Children and Broadway were the only plays listed on all nine returned ballots, while The Second Man received six votes out of nine. (Note: Those who voted included Alexander Woollcott, Brooks Atkinson, George Jean Nathan, Robert Benchley, Percy Hammond, Gilbert Gabriel, John Anderson, Frank Vreeland, and E. W. Osborne.) However, Mantle decided to forgo including The Second Man in favor of Daisy Mayme by George Kelly, which had received only two votes. He gave as reason that the latter play was "more purposeful and a more serious study of American character in general."

=== Broadway closing ===
The Second Man closed at the Guild Theatre on Saturday, October 8, 1927, after 178 performances.

== West End production ==
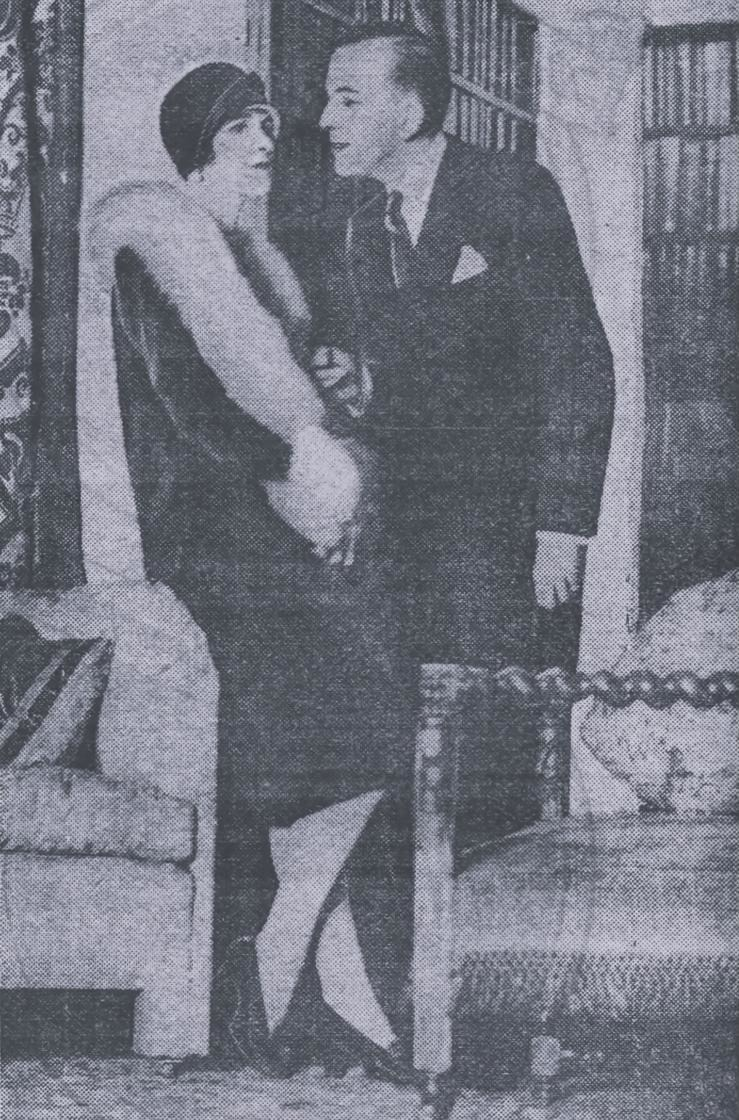

The Second Man had its West End premiere on January 24, 1928, at the Playhouse Theatre. It was jointly produced by the Danial Mayer Company and Basil Dean, who also staged it. It starred Noël Coward, with Raymond Massey as Austin Lowe, Zena Dare as Mrs. Kendall Frayne, and Ursula Jeans as Monica Grey. Hubert Griffith called it a "comedy of spirit and intelligence" and likened the characters to those of Anton Chekov, in that they were "inconstant and hesitating", and capable of having more than one motive at a time. The Second Man continued at the Playhouse until April 28, 1928, when it moved over to Golders Green.

== Adaptations ==
=== Film ===
- He Knew Women (1930) - Hugh Herbert and William B. Jutte adapted The Second Man for this RKO Pictures early sound film.

=== Radio ===
- WEAF - A scene from The Second Man was broadcast Friday, July 15, 1927 at 7:00 pm. Margalo Gillmore and Earle Larimore were the performers. Reviewer Eric H. Palmer said "They sounded as if rather 'mike' stricken, a common affliction."

== Bibliography ==
- Burns Mantle (ed). The Best Plays of 1927-28 And The Year Book Of The Drama In America. Dodd, Mead and Company, 1928.
- S. N. Behrman. The Second Man: A Comedy. Samuel French, 1928.
- S. N. Behrman. People in a Diary: A Memoir by S. N. Behrman. Little, Brown and Company, 1972.
