= Lumsden Hare =

American actor (1874–1964)

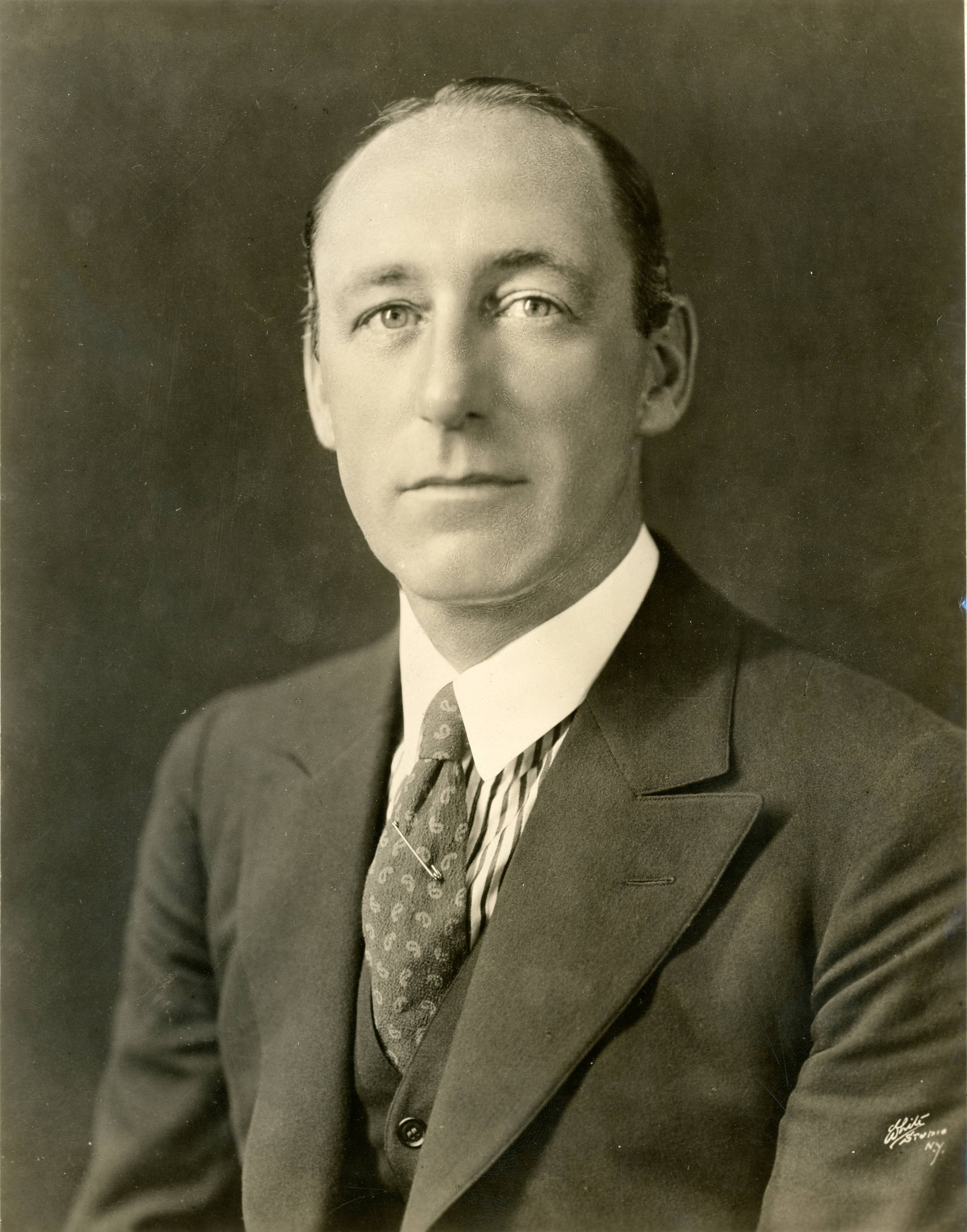
- Hare in 1922
- Born: Francis Lumsden Hare; 17 October 1874; County Tipperary, Ireland
- Died: 28 August 1964 (aged 89); Beverly Hills, California, U.S.
- Occupations: Actor; theatre director; theatrical producer
- Years active: 1900–1961
- Spouse: Selene Johnson

Francis Lumsden Hare (17 October 1874 – 28 August 1964) was an Irish-born American film and theatre actor. He was also a theatre director and theatrical producer.

== Early years ==
Hare was born in County Tipperary, Ireland. He studied at St. Dunstan's College in London.

== Career ==
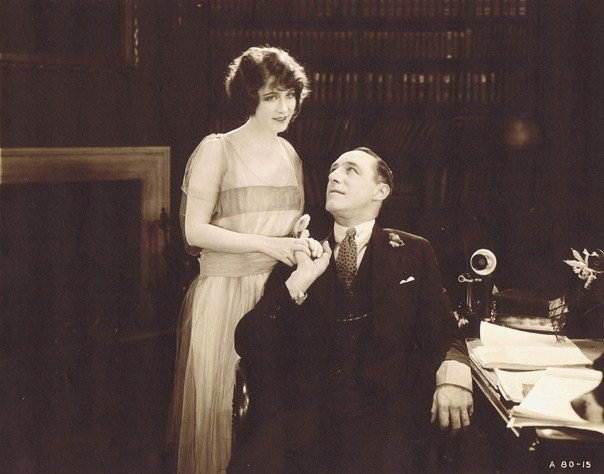
Hare with Elsie Ferguson in The Avalanche (1919)

Hare appeared in more than 35 Broadway productions between 1900 and 1942. In 1908, he made his Broadway debut in the play What Every Woman Knows, starring Maude Adams. Throughout his career, he occasionally also did double duty as director (Peter's Mother [1918]) or producer (What Every Woman Knows [1926 revival], Elmer Gantry [1928], etc.)

He began appearing in films in 1916. The New York Times critic Mordaunt Hall praised his performances repeatedly:

- Scotland Yard (1930): "Lumsden Hare's interpretation of the knowledgeful Scotland Yard commissioner is intelligent and well-spoken."
- Svengali (1931): "with Dundreary whiskers, is splendid as Taffy."
- The World Moves On (1934): "plays Mary's father with a gratifying authority."

During the 1940s, he appeared in several mostly uncredited small and supporting roles for Metro-Goldwyn-Mayer. By his final screen appearance in 1961, Hare had amassed over 140 film credits and appeared on television in over a dozen productions.

== Personal life and death ==
Hare was married to actress Selene Johnson. He died 28 August 1964, aged 89, in Beverly Hills, California.

== Complete filmography ==
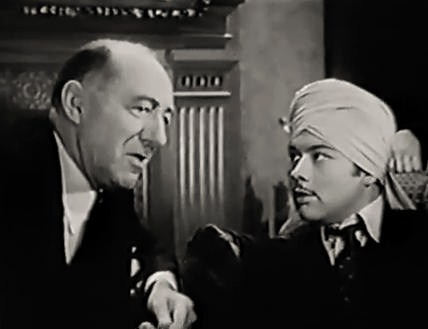
with Turhan Bey in Shadows on the Stairs (1941)

- Love's Crucible (1916 short) as Stephen Wright
- As in a Looking Glass (1916) as Andrew Livingston
- The Test (1916) as Arthur Thome
- Arms and the Woman (1916) as David Fravoe
- Envy (1917) as Stanton Skinner
- Barbary Sheep (1917) as Sir Claude Wyverne
- The Seven Deadly Sins (1917) as Stanton Skinner (Envy)
- National Red Cross Pageant (1917) as The Archbishop of Canterbury – English episode
- The Light Within (1918) as Clinton Durand
- The Avalanche (1919) as Price Ruyler
- The Country Cousin (1919) as Archie Gore
- Mothers of Men (1920) as Capt. Von Pfaffen
- The Blue Pearl (1920) as Holland Webb
- Children Not Wanted (1920) as Marcus Hazzard
- The Frisky Mrs. Johnson (1920) as Frank Morley
- Thoughtless Women (1920) as John Hewitt, The Banker
- The Education of Elizabeth (1921) as Thomas
- Sherlock Holmes (1922) as Dr. Leighton
- On the Banks of the Wabash (1923) as Paul Bixler
- Second Youth (1924) as James Remmick
- One Way Street (1925) as Sir Edward Hutton
- Fugitives (1929) as Uncle Ned
- Girls Gone Wild (1929) as Tom Holworthy
- The Black Watch (1929) as Colonel of the Black Watch
- Salute (1929) as Rear Admiral John Randall
- The Sky Hawk (1929) as Judge Allan
- Crazy That Way (1930) as Mr. Jordan
- So This Is London (1930) as Lord Percy Worthing
- Scotland Yard (1930) as Sir Clive Heathcote
- Under Suspicion (1930) as Freil
- Charlie Chan Carries On (1931) as Inspector Hayley
- Svengali (1931) as Monsieur Taffy
- Always Goodbye (1931) as Blake
- The Road to Singapore (1931) as Mr. Wey-Smith
- Arrowsmith (1931) as Sir Robert Fairland – Governor
- The Silent Witness (1932) as Colonel Grayson
- Devil's Lottery (1932) as Inspector Avery
- The White Sister (1933) as Commander (uncredited)
- International House (1933) as Sir Mortimer Fortescue
- College Humor (1933) as College President
- His Double Life (1933) as Oxford
- Man of Two Worlds (1934) as Captain Swan
- The House of Rothschild (1934) as Prince Regent
- Black Moon (1934) as John Macklin
- The World Moves On (1934) as Gabriel Warburton (1825) / Sir John Warburton (1914)
- Outcast Lady (1934) as Guy
- The Little Minister (1934) as Tammas Whammond
- The Lives of a Bengal Lancer (1935) as Sgt. Clark
- Clive of India (1935) as Maj. Gen. Sir Thomas Woodley
- Folies Bergère de Paris (1935) as Gustave
- Cardinal Richelieu (1935) as Gustavus Adolphus – King of Sweden
- Lady Tubbs (1935) as Lord Abernathy
- She (1935) as Dugmore (uncredited)
- The Crusades (1935) as Robert – Earl of Leicester
- The Bishop Misbehaves (1935) as Constable
- Freckles (1935) as James McLean
- The Three Musketeers (1935) as Captain de Treville
- The Great Impersonation (1935) as Duke Henry
- Professional Soldier (1935) as Paul Valdis
- Under Two Flags (1936) as Lord Seraph
- The Princess Comes Across (1936) as Detective Cragg
- The Last of the Mohicans (1936) as General Abercrombie
- The Charge of the Light Brigade (1936) as Col. Woodward (uncredited)
- Lloyd's of London (1936) as Capt. Suckling
- The Last of Mrs. Cheyney (1937) as Inspector Witherspoon
- Parnell (1937) as Editor (uncredited)
- The Life of Emile Zola (1937) as Mr. Richards
- The Littlest Diplomat (1937 short) as Colonel Hardwick
- Life Begins with Love (1937) as Col. William Addington Drake III
- A Christmas Carol (1938) as Man Discussing Scrooge's Funeral (uncredited)
- Gunga Din (1939) as Major Mitchell
- Captain Fury (1939) as Mr. Bailey
- The Giant of Norway (1939 short) as Fridtjof Nansen (uncredited)
- Northwest Passage (1940) as Lord Amherst
- Rebecca (1940) as Mr. Tabbs
- A Dispatch from Reuter's (1940) as Chairman
- Hudson's Bay (1941) as Capt. Alan MacKinnon (uncredited)
- Shadows on the Stairs (1941) as Inspector
- More Trifles of Importance (1941 short) as Duke (uncredited)
- One Night in Lisbon (1941) as Doorman (uncredited)
- Dr. Jekyll and Mr. Hyde (1941) as Colonel Weymouth
- Passage from Hong Kong (1941) as Inspector Bray
- The Blonde from Singapore (1941) as Reginald Belvin
- Suspicion (1941) as Inspector Hodgson (uncredited)
- Confirm or Deny (1941) as Sir Titus Scott, Penzance Chronicle
- This Above All (1942) as First Headwaiter (uncredited)
- The Greatest Gift (1942 short) as Father Cyprian (uncredited)
- Random Harvest (1942) as Sir John (uncredited)
- The Gorilla Man (1943) as General Randall Devon
- London Blackout Murders (1943) as Supt. Neil
- Forever and a Day (1943) as Fitch
- Mission to Moscow (1943) as Lord Chilston (uncredited)
- The Man from Down Under (1943) as Government Official at Train Station (uncredited)
- Holy Matrimony (1943) as Benson, Lady Vale's footman (uncredited)
- Jack London (1943) as English Correspondent
- Madame Curie (1943) as Professor Roget (uncredited)
- The Lodger (1944) as Dr. Sheridan (uncredited)
- Passport to Destiny (1944) as Freighter Captain Mack
- The White Cliffs of Dover (1944) as The Vicar (uncredited)
- The Canterville Ghost (1944) as Mr. Potts
- The Keys of the Kingdom (1944) as Daniel Glennie (scenes cut)
- Jungle Queen (1945) as Mr. 'X'
- The Picture of Dorian Gray (1945) as Thornton (uncredited)
- The Valley of Decision (1945) as Dr. McClintock (uncredited)
- Love Letters (1945) as Mr. Quinton (uncredited)
- Captain Kidd (1945) as Lord Fallsworth (uncredited)
- The Green Years (1946) as Lawyer McKellar (uncredited)
- Sister Kenny (1946) as Dr. Shadrack (uncredited)
- It Happened in Brooklyn (1947) as Canon Green (uncredited)
- The Private Affairs of Bel Ami (1947) as Mayor of Canteleu
- The Imperfect Lady (1947) as Hardy (uncredited)
- Ivy (1947) as Dr. Lanchester (uncredited)
- The Secret Life of Walter Mitty (1947) as Dr. Pritchard-Mitford (uncredited)
- Green Dolphin Street (1947) as Anderson (uncredited)
- The Exile (1947) as Roundhead General
- The Paradine Case (1947) as Courtroom Attendant (uncredited)
- The Swordsman (1948) as Rev. Douglas (uncredited)
- Mr. Peabody and the Mermaid (1948) as Colonel Mandrake
- Hills of Home (1948) as Lord Kilspindie
- The Fighting O'Flynn (1949) as The Viceroy
- Challenge to Lassie (1948) as MacFarland
- That Forsyte Woman (1949) as Roger Forsyte
- Fortunes of Captain Blood (1950) as Tom Mannering
- Rogues of Sherwood Forest (1950) as Warwick (uncredited)
- David and Bathsheba (1951) as Old Shepherd (uncredited)
- Dick Turpin's Ride (1951) as Sir Robert Walpole
- The Desert Fox: The Story of Rommel (1951) as Doctor (uncredited)
- 5 Fingers (1952) as Member of Parliament (uncredited)
- And Now Tomorrow (1952)
- Diplomatic Courier (1952) as Jacks (uncredited)
- My Cousin Rachel (1952) as Tamblyn (uncredited)
- Rogue's March (1953) as President (uncredited)
- Julius Caesar (1953) as Publius
- Young Bess (1953) as Archbishop Cranmer
- Crusade to Liberty (1954 TV movie)
- Rose Marie (1954) as The Judge (uncredited)
- King Richard and the Crusaders (1954) as Physician (uncredited)
- The First Mintmaster (1955 TV movie) as Gov. Winthrop
- Battle Cry (1955) as New Zealander in Bar (uncredited)
- The Finest Gift (1955 TV movie) as Ambassador Wakefield
- Johnny Tremain (1957) as Adm. Montagu
- Count Your Blessings (1959) as John
- The Oregon Trail (1959) as Sir Richard Wallingham, British Ambassador (uncredited)
- The Four Skulls of Jonathan Drake (1959) as Rogers
