= Murder Is My Beat =

1955 film by Edgar George Ulmer

- Theatrical release poster
- Directed by: Edgar G. Ulmer
- Screenplay by: Aubrey Wiseberg
- Story by: Aubrey Wiseberg; Martin Field
- Produced by: Aubrey Wisberg
- Starring: Paul Langton; Barbara Payton; Robert Shayne
- Cinematography: Harold E. Wellman
- Edited by: Fred R. Feitshans Jr.
- Music by: Albert Glasser
- Production company: Masthead Productions
- Distributed by: Allied Artists Pictures
- Release date: February 27, 1955 (United States)
- Running time: 77 minutes
- Country: United States
- Language: English

Murder Is My Beat is an American 1955 film noir mystery film directed by Edgar G. Ulmer starring Paul Langton, Barbara Payton and Robert Shayne.

Murder Is My Beat is available for free viewing and download at the Internet Archive.

== Plot ==
Businessman Frank Deane is found dead with his face and hands burned beyond recognition. Detective Patrick (Langton) pursues and arrests Deane's girlfriend, nightclub-singer Eden Lane (Payton). She makes little effort to deny her involvement in the death and is convicted of the crime. On the way to prison, accompanied by Patrick, Eden sees a man through the train window whom she identifies as the murdered man. Patrick, who has developed a romantic interest in the woman, believes her; he and Eden jump from the train to search for the man. They agree to allow themselves one week to solve this mystery or Eden will submit to her prison sentence. The situation has, naturally, put Patrick in legal jeopardy as well and he is eventually tracked down by his friend and superior, Detective Rawley (Shayne). Eden, in the meantime, convinced that the truth cannot be unveiled, furtively leaves Patrick and turns herself in. Rawley allows himself and Patrick twenty-four hours to try to bring together information and clues Patrick has turned up.

== Cast ==
- Paul Langton as Ray Patrick
- Barbara Payton as Eden Lane
- Robert Shayne as Det. Bert Rawley
- Selena Royle as Beatrice Abbott
- Roy Gordon as Mr. Abbott
- Tracy Roberts as Patsy Flint
- Kate MacKenna as Miss Farre
- Henry W. Harvey Sr. as the gas station attendant
- Jay Adler as Louie, the bartender

== See also ==
- List of American films of 1955
