= Jane (play) =

American play first staged in 1946

Jane is a play by the American writer S. N. Behrman, based on a 1923 story by Somerset Maugham. It was first staged in Britain December 1946 at the Grand Theatre in Blackpool. Its West End run at the Aldwych Theatre lasted for 274 performances from 29 January to 27 September 1947. The original cast included Yvonne Arnaud in the title role, as well as Irene Browne, Ursula Howells, Ronald Squire, Charles Victor. Arnaud was praised for her comic acting.

In 1952 it was staged at the Coronet Theatre on Broadway, lasting for more than a hundred performances.

== Bibliography ==
- Wearing, J.P. The London Stage 1940-1949: A Calendar of Productions, Performers, and Personnel. Rowman & Littlefield, 2014.
