= Mourning Becomes Electra =

Play written by Eugene O'Neill

- 1931 Liveright first edition cover
- Written by: Eugene O'Neill
- Original language: English
- Genre: Drama
- Setting: 1865, New England

Premiere
- Date premiered: 26 October 1931
- Place premiered: Guild Theatre; New York City

Mourning Becomes Electra is a play cycle written by American playwright Eugene O'Neill. The play premiered on Broadway at the Guild Theatre on 26 October 1931 where it ran for 150 performances before closing in March 1932, starring Lee Baker (Ezra), Earle Larimore (Orin), Alice Brady (Lavinia) and Alla Nazimova (Christine). In May 1932, it was unsuccessfully revived at the Alvin Theatre (now the Neil Simon Theatre) with Thurston Hall (Ezra), Walter Abel (Orin), Judith Anderson (Lavinia) and Florence Reed (Christine), and, in 1972, at the Circle in the Square Theatre, with Donald Davis (Ezra), Stephen McHattie (Orin), Pamela Payton-Wright (Lavinia), and Colleen Dewhurst (Christine).

== Characters and background ==
=== Main characters ===
- Brigadier General Ezra Mannon
- Christine Mannon, his wife
- Lavinia Mannon – their daughter
- Orin Mannon – their son, First Lieutenant of Infantry
- Captain Adam Brant – of the clipper "Flying Trades"
- Captain Peter Niles – Orin's friend, from the U.S. Artillery
- Hazel Niles – his sister
- Seth Beckwith – the old family retainer and gardener

=== Chorus of townsfolk – (various chorus members appear in different scenes) ===
- Amos Ames – a middle-aged carpenter
- Louisa Ames – Amos' wife
- Minnie – Louisa's cousin
- The Chantyman
- Josiah Bordon – manager of the shipping company
- Emma – his wife
- Everett Hills, D.D. – of the First Congregational Church
- His wife
- Doctor Joseph Blake – a family physician
- Ira Mackel – an old farmer
- Joe Silva – a Portuguese fishing captain
- Abner Small – a little old clerk in a hardware store

The story is a retelling of the Oresteia by Aeschylus. The characters parallel characters from the ancient Greek plays. For example, Agamemnon from the Oresteia becomes General Ezra Mannon. Clytemnestra becomes Christine, Orestes becomes Orin, Electra becomes Lavinia, Aegisthus becomes Adam Brant, etc. As a Greek tragedy made modern, the play features murder, adultery, incestuous love, and revenge, as well as a group of townspeople who function as a kind of Greek chorus. Although fate alone guides characters' actions in Greek tragedies, O'Neill's characters also have motivations grounded in 1930s-era psychological theory. The play can easily be read from a Freudian perspective, paying attention to various characters' Oedipus complexes and Electra complexes.

Mourning Becomes Electra is divided into three plays with themes that correspond to the Oresteia trilogy. Much like the Aeschylus plays Agamemnon, The Libation Bearers, and The Eumenides, these three plays by O'Neill are correspondingly titled Homecoming, The Hunted, and The Haunted, respectively. These plays are normally not produced individually, however, but only as part of the larger trilogy. Each play contains four to five acts, with only the first act of The Haunted being divided into actual scenes. Thus, Mourning Becomes Electra is extraordinarily lengthy. In many productions, the length is cut for the sake of practicality, and the chorus of townsfolk cut from productions due to the expense, leaving only the eight main players.

== Plot ==
=== Homecoming ===
Act I It is late spring in front of the Mannon house. The master of the house, Brigadier-General Ezra Mannon, is soon to return from the Civil War. Lavinia, Ezra's daughter, like her mother Christine, has just returned from a trip to New York. Seth, the gardener, takes Lavinia aside. He warns her against her would-be beau, Captain Brant. Before Seth can continue, Lavinia's friend Peter Niles and his sister, Hazel, arrive. If Peter is proposing marriage to Lavinia again, he must realize she cannot marry anyone because her father needs her. Seth asks Lavinia if she has noticed that Brant resembles members of the Mannon family. Seth believes Brant is the child of David Mannon (Ezra's uncle, who later hanged himself) and Marie Brantôme (a French Canadian nurse), a couple expelled from the house due to fear of scandal and public disgrace.

Suddenly Brant himself enters from the drive. Calculatingly, Lavinia derides the memory of Brant's mother, who died of starvation as Ezra never replied to a message she sent for help. Brant explodes and reveals his heritage. He tells Lavinia that her own grandfather (Ezra's father) also craved his mother and thus cast David out of the family. Brant has sworn vengeance.

Act II Lavinia appears inside her father's study. Christine enters indignantly, wondering why Lavinia has summoned her. Lavinia reveals that she followed her to New York and saw her kissing Adam Brant. Christine defiantly tells Lavinia that she has long hated Ezra and that Lavinia was born of her disgust for him. She loves Lavinia's brother Orin because he always seemed to be hers alone, and never Ezra's. Lavinia says that she will keep her mother's adultery a secret for Ezra's sake but Christine must promise to never see Brant again. Christine accuses her daughter of wanting Brant for herself. Christine then appears to agree to Lavinia's terms but proposes to Brant that they poison Ezra and attribute his death to his heart trouble.

Act III One week later, Lavinia stands at the top of the front stairs with Christine waiting for Ezra. When he arrives, Lavinia rushes forward and embraces him. Once Ezra is alone with his wife, he impulsively kisses her hand. The war has made him realize that they must put aside their differences. Christine agrees. They kiss and, for the first time in many years, share a bed.

Act IV Toward daybreak in Ezra's bedroom, Christine slips out. Ezra, waking, bitterly rebukes her. He believes Christine awaits his death. Later, she deliberately taunts him that she is Brant's mistress. Ezra rises in fury, threatening to kill her but falls back, clutching his heart and begging for his medicine. Christine gives him poison instead. After taking it, Ezra realizes her treachery and calls out to Lavinia. Lavinia rushes into the room. With his dying breath, Ezra indicts his wife: "She's guilty — not medicine!", he gasps, and then dies. Christine collapses in a faint, and Lavinia falls to her knees in anguish.

=== The Hunted ===
Act I Peter, Lavinia, and Orin arrive at the house. Orin complains of his mother's absence. He jealously asks Lavinia about Christine and Brant. Lavinia warns him against believing their mother to be innocent of an affair. Suddenly, Christine appears and embraces her son jubilantly.

Act II Orin asks his mother about Brant. Christine explains that Lavinia has gone mad. Orin sits at Christine's feet and recounts his wonderful dreams about the two of them in the South Sea Islands. The islands represent everything the war was not: peace, warmth, and security, or Christine herself. Lavinia reappears in the room and coldly calls Orin to view their father's body.

Act III In the study, Orin tells Lavinia that Christine has already warned him of her madness. Lavinia insists that Orin certainly cannot let their mother's lover escape. She proposes that they watch Christine until she goes to meet Brant as this should convince Orin of her treachery. Orin agrees.

Act IV The night after Ezra's funeral, Brant's clipper ship appears at a wharf in East Boston. Christine sneaks out to meet Brant on the deck, and they retire to the cabin. Lavinia and an enraged Orin (who followed their mother from the house) listen from the deck. Brant and Christine decide to flee east and seek out their Blessed Islands. They painfully bid each other farewell. When Brant returns, Orin shoots him and ransacks the room to make it seem that Brant has been robbed.

Act V The following night Christine paces the drive before the Mannon house. Orin and Lavinia appear, revealing that they killed Brant. Christine collapses. Orin kneels beside her promising he will make her happy, that they can leave Lavinia at home and go abroad together. Lavinia orders Orin into the house. He obeys. Lavinia tells her mother she can still live. Christine glares at her daughter then enters the house. Lavinia remains outside. A gunshot is heard from Ezra's study. Lavinia stammers: "It is justice!"

=== The Haunted ===
Act I, scene 1 A year later, Lavinia and Orin return from their trip abroad. Lavinia now resembles her mother, even wearing a green dress like the one her mother was wearing at the start of the play. Orin has grown dreadfully thin and bears the statue-like attitude of his father.

Act I, scene 2 In the sitting room, Orin grimly remarks that Lavinia has stolen Christine's soul. Peter enters from the rear and gasps, thinking he has seen Christine's ghost. Lavinia approaches him eagerly. Orin jealously mocks his sister's warmth toward Peter, accusing her of becoming a true romantic during their time in the South Seas.

Act II A month later, Orin is working intently at a manuscript in the Mannon study. Lavinia enters and asks what he is doing. Orin says they must atone for their mother's death. As the last male Mannon, he has written a history of the family crimes. He then observes that Lavinia only became pretty like their mother on the islands they visited. Orin angrily accuses her of sleeping with one of the men on that island and Lavinia assumes Christine's taunting voice. Reacting like Ezra, Orin grasps her throat, threatening to kill her. It becomes apparent that Orin has taken Ezra's place as Lavinia has taken Christine's.

Act III A moment later, the scene switches to Hazel and Peter in the sitting room. Orin enters, insisting that he see Hazel alone. He gives her a sealed envelope, warning her to keep it away from Lavinia. She should only open it, (a) if something happens to him, or (b) if Lavinia tries to marry Peter. Lavinia enters from the hall. Hazel tries to keep Orin's envelope hidden behind her back, but Lavinia rushes to Orin, beseeching him to let her see it. After Lavinia says she loves him, and agrees to do whatever he wants, Orin gives her the envelope. Orin then tells Hazel to leave.

Orin forbids Lavinia from ever seeing Peter again. He tells her he loves her. Lavinia stares at him in horror, saying, "For God's sake—! No! You're insane! You can't mean—!" Lavinia wishes his death. Startled, Orin realizes that his death would be another act of justice. He thinks Christine is speaking through Lavinia.

Peter appears in the doorway in the midst of the argument. Orin remarks that he was about to go clean his pistol and exits. Lavinia throws herself into Peter's arms. A muffled shot is heard, as Orin commits suicide in the other room.

Act IV Three days later, Lavinia appears dressed in deep mourning. A resolute Hazel arrives and insists that Lavinia not marry Peter. Hazel admits she has told Peter of Orin's envelope. Peter arrives, and he and Lavinia pledge their love anew. Surprised by the bitterness in his voice, Lavinia desperately flings herself into his arms crying, "Take me, Adam!" Then, horrified, she breaks off their engagement and sends Peter away.

She realizes she is forever bound to the Mannon dead. As there is no one left to punish her, she must punish herself. She decides to live alone in the old house with the ghosts of her ancestors. She orders Seth to board up the windows and throw out all the flowers – then she enters the dark house alone and shuts the door.

== Adaptations ==
In 1947 the play was adapted for film by Dudley Nichols, starring Rosalind Russell, Michael Redgrave, Raymond Massey, Katina Paxinou, Leo Genn and Kirk Douglas. It was nominated for Academy Awards for Best Actor in a Leading Role (Michael Redgrave) and Best Actress in a Leading Role (Rosalind Russell).

In 1967, the Metropolitan Opera gave the world premiere of an operatic version, composed by Marvin David Levy to the libretto of William Henry Butler. Both film and opera retain O'Neill's title.

In 1978, a five-hour television miniseries was produced for and shown on PBS's Great Performances, which starred Bruce Davison, Roberta Maxwell and Joan Hackett. It was well received by the critics, with Hackett, in particular, being highly praised for her portrayal of Christine.

In 2010, it was adapted in India in the Malayalam language as Elektra.

== Notable productions ==
Ronald Lewis' appearance in a 1955 stage production directed by Peter Hall led to Lewis being put under contract by Alexander Korda.

== Themes ==
There are literary readings that classify Mourning Becomes Electra in the naturalism movement. This is based on O'Neill's focus on violent emotional states of men to emphasize the subconscious and inner spiritual forces as well as man's inability to escape the cyclical pattern and outcomes of human action. Like the Oresteia, the play explores the theme of revenge, where the crime of the past determines the actions and the suffering of the protagonist in the present. For this theme, some observers note that O'Neill's approach is more similar to William Shakespeare's outlook in Hamlet than Aeschylus' in the Oresteia.

O'Neill also differed from Aeschylus on the theme of fate and the role of the gods in the lives of men. In the Oresteia, as was the case in the classical Greek tragedies, the divine is part of the environmental forces that humans cannot control but determine their fate. In O'Neill's interpretation, these forces are eliminated in favor of Freudian and Jungian psychology.

== Awards and nominations ==
Awards

- 2004 Laurence Olivier Award for Best Revival
