= Scotland Yard (1930 film) =

1930 film

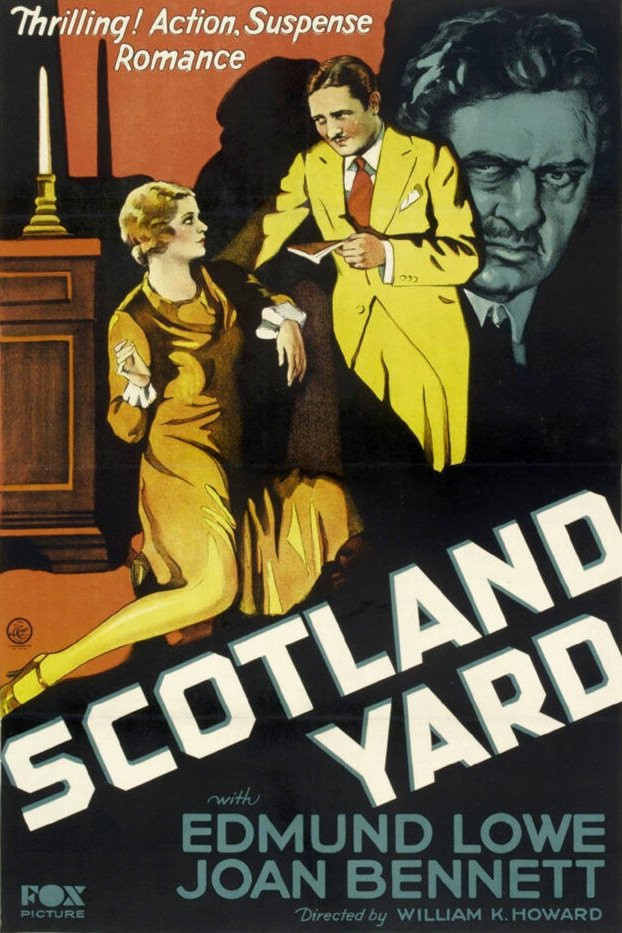
- Theatrical release poster
- Directed by: William K. Howard
- Screenplay by: Garrett Fort
- Based on: Scotland Yard by Denison Clift
- Produced by: Ralph Block
- Starring: Edmund Lowe; Joan Bennett; Donald Crisp; Georges Renavent; Lumsden Hare; David Torrence
- Cinematography: George Schneiderman
- Edited by: Jack Murray
- Music by: Arthur Kay
- Production company: Fox Film Corporation
- Distributed by: Fox Film Corporation
- Release date: October 19, 1930
- Running time: 75 minutes
- Country: United States
- Language: English

Scotland Yard is a 1930 American pre-Code crime film directed by William K. Howard, written by Garrett Fort, and starring Edmund Lowe, Joan Bennett, Donald Crisp, Georges Renavent, Lumsden Hare and David Torrence. It was released on October 19, 1930, by Fox Film Corporation. It is based on the 1929 play Scotland Yard by Denison Clift. In 1941, the film was remade under the same title.

The film depicts identity theft. A financier who went missing in action during World War I is impersonated by a swindler.

== Plot ==
In London following the First World War, a criminal masquerades of a financier who had gone missing in action with the intent of stealing large sums of money.

== Cast ==
- Edmund Lowe as Sir John Lasher / Dakin Barrolles
- Joan Bennett as Xandra, Lady Lasher
- Donald Crisp as Charles Fox
- Georges Renavent as Dr. Dean
- Lumsden Hare as Sir Clive Heathcote
- David Torrence as Captain Graves
- Barbara Leonard as Nurse Cecilia
- Norman Ainsley as Reggie, Xandra's Suitor
- Adrienne D'Ambricourt as Madame Rousseau, Innkeeper
- Halliwell Hobbes as Lord St. Arran
- Arnold Lucy as Mc Killop
- J. Carrol Naish as Dr. Remur
- Reginald Sharland as Lasher's Secretary
