= Dark Victory =

1939 film by Edmund Goulding

- Theatrical release poster
- Directed by: Edmund Goulding
- Written by: Casey Robinson
- Based on: Dark Victory; 1934 play by George Emerson Brewer Jr. Bertram Bloch
- Produced by: David Lewis
- Starring: Bette Davis; George Brent; Geraldine Fitzgerald; Humphrey Bogart; Henry Travers; Ronald Reagan; Cora Witherspoon
- Cinematography: Ernest Haller
- Edited by: William Holmes
- Music by: Max Steiner
- Production company: Warner Bros. Pictures
- Distributed by: Warner Bros. Pictures
- Release date: April 22, 1939 (U.S.)
- Running time: 104 minutes
- Country: United States
- Language: English
- Budget: $1 million (est) or $318,000

Dark Victory is a 1939 American melodrama film directed by Edmund Goulding, starring Bette Davis, and featuring George Brent, Humphrey Bogart, Geraldine Fitzgerald, Ronald Reagan, Henry Travers, and Cora Witherspoon. The screenplay by Casey Robinson was based on the 1934 play of the same title by George Brewer and Bertram Bloch, starring Tallulah Bankhead.

== Plot ==
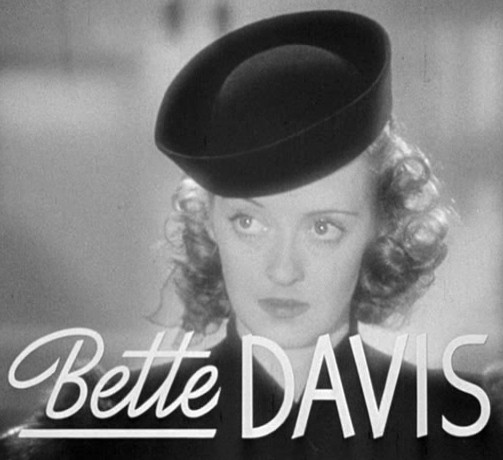
From the trailer

Judith "Judy" Traherne is a young, carefree, hedonistic Long Island socialite and heiress with a passion for horses, fast cars, and too much smoking and drinking. She initially ignores severe headaches and brief episodes of dizziness and double vision, but when she uncharacteristically takes a spill while riding and then tumbles down a flight of stairs, her secretary and best friend Ann King insists she see the family doctor, who refers her to a specialist.

Dr. Frederick Steele is closing his New York City office in preparation for a move to Brattleboro, Vermont, where he plans to devote his time to brain cell research and scientific study on their growth. He reluctantly agrees to see Judy, who acts coldly and is openly antagonistic towards him. She shows signs of short-term memory loss but dismisses her symptoms. Steele convinces her the ailments she is experiencing are severe and potentially life-threatening and puts his career plans on hold to tend to her.

When diagnostic tests confirm his suspicions, Judy agrees to surgery to remove a malignant glioma brain tumor. Steele discovers the tumor cannot be removed entirely and realizes she has less than a year to live. The end will be painless but swift; shortly after experiencing total blindness, Judy will die.

To allow her a few more months of happiness, Steele opts to lie to Judy and Ann and assures them the surgery was a success. As he is a poor liar, Ann is suspicious and confronts Steele, who admits the truth. Steele tells Ann "she must never know" she will die soon. She agrees to remain silent and continue the lie.

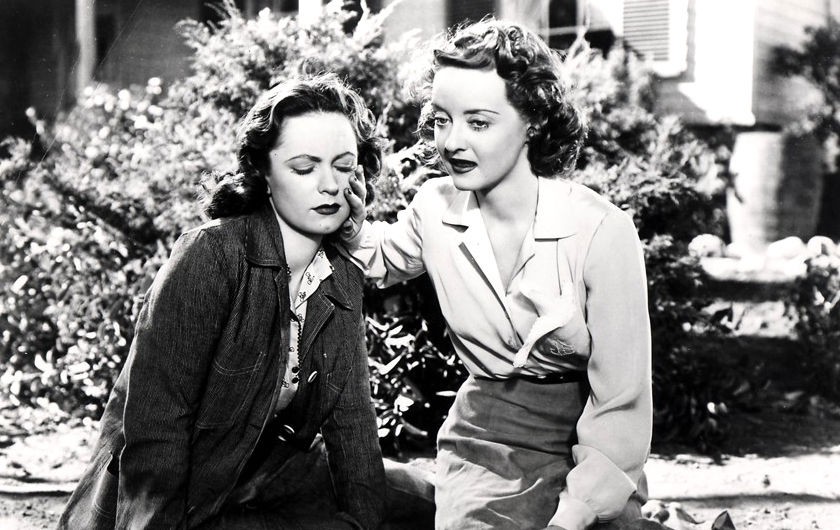
Geraldine Fitzgerald and Bette Davis, after "Judy" has lost her sight, in final minutes of Dark Victory

Judy and Steele become involved romantically and eventually engaged. While helping his assistant pack the office before their departure for Vermont, Judy discovers her case history file containing letters from several doctors, all of them confirming Steele's prognosis. Assuming Steele was marrying her out of pity, Judy breaks off the engagement and reverts to her former lifestyle. One day, her stable master Michael O'Leary, who for years has loved her from afar, confronts her about her unruly behavior, and she confesses she is dying. Their conversation convinces her she should spend her final months happy, dignified, and with the man she loves. She apologizes to Steele, and they marry and move to Vermont.

Three months later, Ann comes to visit. Judy and she are in the garden planting bulbs when Judy comments on how odd it is she still feels the sun's heat under the rapidly darkening skies. They both immediately realize she is losing her vision and approaching the end. Judy makes Ann stay mum, as Steele leaves that day to present his most recent medical findings—which hold out the long-term prospect of a cure for her type of cancer—in New York. Judy makes an excuse to remain home, helps him pack, and sends him off, telling him, "What we have now can't be destroyed. That's our victory, our victory over the dark. It's a victory because we're not afraid."

Then, after bidding Ann, her housekeeper Martha (who has silently deduced the situation), and her dogs farewell, she goes to her bedroom. Martha follows Judy and, upon entering the room, pauses as she sees Judy kneeling briefly, apparently praying. Judy then lies down on the bed; Martha drapes a blanket over her, withdrawing quietly when Judy asks to be left alone.

== Cast ==
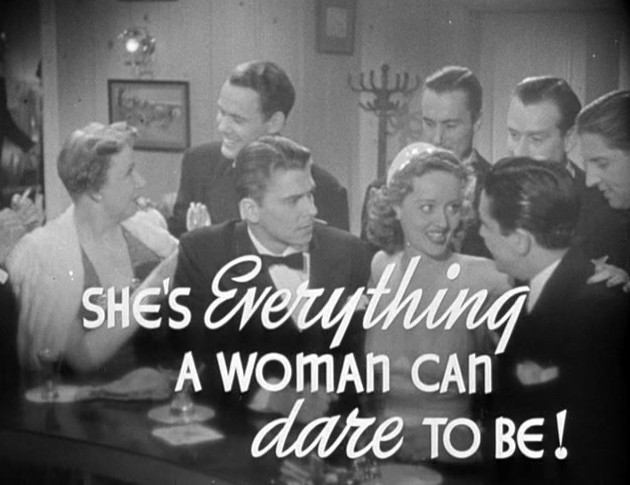
Ronald Reagan and Bette Davis (center, left to right) in the film's trailer

- Bette Davis as Judith Traherne
- George Brent as Dr. Frederick Steele
- Humphrey Bogart as Michael O'Leary
- Geraldine Fitzgerald as Ann King
- Ronald Reagan as Alec Hamm
- Henry Travers as Dr. Parsons
- Cora Witherspoon as Carrie Spottswood
- Dorothy Peterson as Miss Wainwright
- Virginia Brissac as Martha
- Charles Richman as Colonel Mantle
- Herbert Rawlinson as Dr. Carter
- Leonard Mudie as Dr. Driscoll
- Fay Helm as Miss Dodd
- Lottie Williams as Lucy

Cast notes:

- Dark Victory was Irish-born actress Geraldine Fitzgerald's first American film, after having appeared in films made in England, and on the Broadway stage.
- This was the eighth, of eleven, on-screen teaming of Bette Davis and George Brent.

== Production ==
=== Development ===
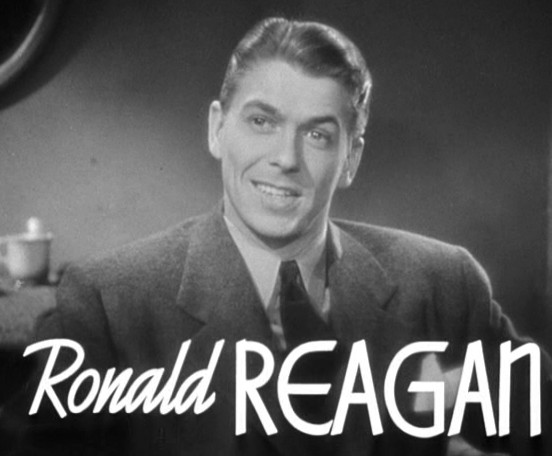
From the film's trailer

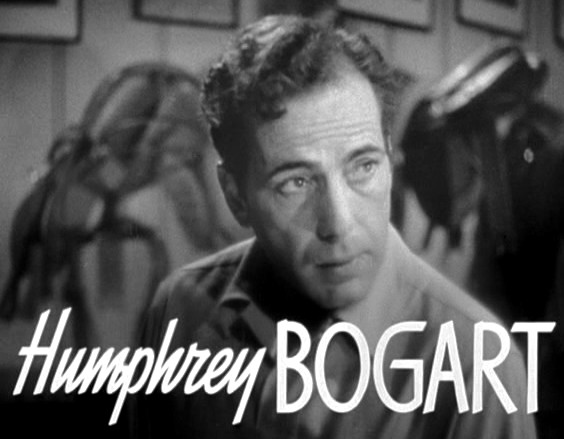
From the trailer

Tallulah Bankhead originated the role of Judith Traherne in the Broadway production, which ran for 51 performances at the Plymouth Theatre, before being cut short when Bankhead fell ill with a bacterial infection. Davis openly admitted in later years that she had emulated Bankhead in the role. In 1935, David O. Selznick wanted to cast Greta Garbo and Fredric March in the leads, but Garbo chose to play the lead in Anna Karenina instead. In 1936, he offered the role to Merle Oberon, but contractual problems with Samuel Goldwyn prevented her from doing the film.

When Bette Davis discovered the play in 1938, she shopped it to every producer on the Warners lot, and Hal Wallis bought the rights from Selznick for her, for $50,000, when director Edmound Goulding and producer David Lewis showed interest in the project.

According to another account, Casey Robinson, the writer, had wanted to buy the play ever since he saw it on stage, knowing how to adapt it. He lost the rights to David O. Selznick but when Selznick decided not to make it, recommended Hal Wallis buy it for Warners. Robinson said:

The play was about a rich, spoiled girl who gets carcinoma of the brain and is going to die. In the second act she learns she is going to die and accepts it gallantly... They just had a lot of gabble in the third act that meant nothing. There had to be, in the middle of the piece, a period of great rebellion against fate—of anger, which, of course, was mixed up with her love for the doctor. Also, the anger that she hadn’t been told, and so on. That was an entirely new development in the screenplay and a very important one.

Robinson decided the film would be about two things, love and death:

I decided that these two elements should be kept apart as long as possible—that when there was a scene about love, it wasn’t about death; when there was a scene about death, it wasn’t about love. That is, on the surface. So when there was a scene about love, death was underneath it; when there was a scene about death, love was underneath it— all the time until the very end, when they would reunite into a sort of requiem. Now, in order to do that, I needed a character, and that was the birth of Ann [Geraldine Fitzgerald], the secretary-companion of the heroine Judith Traherne. She was not in the play at all.

David Lewis said that Casey Robinson was the one passionate about adapting the play, and that due to this Lewis negotiated Selznick to sell it. Warners agreed in part because they needed a vehicle for Miriam Hopkins, who had been promised We Are Not Alone which had been given to Jane Bryan. The film was assigned to producer Brian Glazer but Robinson insisted it be given to David Lewis. Eventually Bette Davis played the lead role.

Lewis said "The script took its time. It was like a poem the way it began to develop. We both knew all along that there was something very special about Dark Victory; we didn’t think of its commercial values."

=== Shooting ===
Davis had recently ended affairs with William Wyler and Howard Hughes and her husband Ham Nelson had filed for divorce, and after the first few days of filming she begged to be released from her contract, claiming she was too sick to continue. Producer Hal Wallis responded, "I've seen the rushes – stay sick!" She found comfort with Brent, who had just divorced Constance Worth, and the two embarked on an affair that continued throughout filming and for a year – and three films – after. Goulding shot the film in sequence, and the arc of Judith's relationship with Dr. Steele mirrored Davis' relationship with Brent. Davis was later to say that she wanted to marry Brent, but thought that it wouldn't work out. Still, "Of the men I didn't marry, the dearest was George Brent."

The tune "Oh! Give Me Time for Tenderness", sung by Judith, was written by Edmund Goulding and Elsie Janis. The voice of Vera Van was dubbed for Davis. Lewis said this scene was Goulding's idea and Lewis had been reluctant but the producer admitted it was one of the best scenes in the film.

Another scene for the film's ending was shot, but ultimately was deemed anticlimactic: after Judith's death, her horse was seen winning a race, and her stablehand Michael (Bogart) was shown crying. The scene met with negative response with sneak preview audiences and was cut.

The film premiered at Radio City Music Hall.

== Reception ==
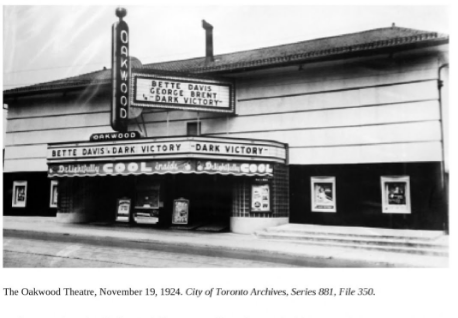
Marquee at the Oakwood Theatre in Toronto promoting Dark Victory

Frank S. Nugent, in his review in The New York Times, observed: "A completely cynical appraisal would dismiss it all as emotional flim-flam, a heartless play upon tender hearts by a playwright and company well versed in the dramatic uses of going blind and improvising on Camille. But it is impossible to be that cynical about it. The mood is too poignant, the performances too honest, the craftsmanship too expert. Miss Davis, naturally, has dominated—and quite properly—her film, but Miss Fitzgerald has added a sentient and touching portrayal of the friend, and George Brent, as the surgeon, is—dare we say?—surprisingly self-contained and mature. This once we must run the risk of being called a softy: we won't dismiss Dark Victory with a self-defensive sneer."

An article in Neurology says the film marked "the beginnings of the depiction of neurologic disease in cinema. Bette Davis' cinematic portrayal of a young woman dying from a brain tumor is close to the reality of denial, bargaining, a hope for a cure, and final acceptance." Although the film "shows an implausible clinical course (an abrupt peaceful ending)...the cinematic portrayal of the vicissitudes of living with a brain tumor is often close to reality."

Variety called the film "intense drama" and "a nicely produced offering [with] Bette Davis in a powerful and impressive role."

Time Out London critic Tom Milne writes: "[Davis] and [director Edmund] Goulding almost transform the soap into style; a Rolls-Royce of the weepie world."

On Turner Classic Movies, Margarita Landazuri said: "Dark Victory was a three-hanky hit. Filmgoers and critics alike knew their emotions were being manipulated, but so expertly and touchingly that they couldn't help but cheer."

The film is mentioned in the play Steel Magnolias, by Clairee in Act Two, Scene 1. It is also mentioned in the 2015 movie The Frontier by the Luanne character as a missed opportunity in her career.

Dark Victory currently holds an 83% rating on Rotten Tomatoes based on 24 reviews. The site's consensus states: "Bette Davis does it her way with a tour de force performance in Dark Victory, a moving melodrama that snatches triumph from the jaws of mortality."

David Lewis wrote, "The film surprised everyone by being a commercial success. It made money and was very well received and reviewed. It was an intimate picture of human beings under tragic circumstances, nobly resolved. It could so easily have been a soap opera, indeed as the various remakes have been. But its humanity and its performances, mainly Bette’s, elevated it into something fine. Bette was very proud of the picture, and I thought it the best work I had done up to that point. "

== Awards and honors ==
Bette Davis was nominated for the Academy Award for Best Actress but lost to Vivien Leigh, star of Gone with the Wind. Max Steiner, who was nominated for the Academy Award for Best Original Score for both this and Gone with the Wind, lost to Herbert Stothart for The Wizard of Oz. The film itself lost the Academy Award for Best Picture to Gone with the Wind.

The New York Times named Dark Victory as one of the "10 Best Films of 1939", as did Film Daily, and the National Board of Review picked both Bette Davis and Geraldine Fitzgerald for Best Acting that year.

The film is recognized by American Film Institute in these lists:

- 2002: AFI's 100 Years...100 Passions – #32
- 2006: AFI's 100 Years...100 Cheers – #72

== Adaptations and remakes ==
=== Radio ===
On January 8, 1940, Davis and Spencer Tracy appeared in a 60-minute adaptation of the film on Lux Radio Theatre. Barbara Stanwyck and Melvyn Douglas had previously performed an adaptation, one based on the original Broadway play, on Lux Radio Theatre on April 4, 1938. On March 6, 1952, CBS Radio's Hollywood Sound Stage aired a condensed 30-minute version starring Stanwyck and David Brian.

=== Film ===
In 1963, the film was remade as Stolen Hours with Susan Hayward and Michael Craig, directed by Daniel Petrie. The action took place in then-contemporary England.

=== Television ===
It was remade in 1953, under its original title, as a TV adaptation for the Broadway Television Theatre, starring Sylvia Sidney, Christopher Plummer, and Ian Keith. In 1976, the story was produced under its original title as an NBC television movie starring Elizabeth Montgomery as television producer Katherine Merrill under the care of Dr. Michael Grant, portrayed by Anthony Hopkins; this version was directed by Robert Butler.

== Music ==
Max Steiner's original score to Dark Victory was released in 2006 by Screen Archives Entertainment and Chelsea Rialto Studios. The album contains the majority of the score as heard in the film in chronological order. It was produced using digital copies of the composer's personal reference acetate discs stored at Brigham Young University which were digitally restored by Ray Faiola. This rare limited edition includes a lavishly illustrated 32-page color booklet featuring extensive liner notes by film and music historians Rudy Behlmer, Ray Faiola and James V. D'Arc (curator of the BYU Film Music Archives) detailing the film's production and scoring.

Track listing

1. Main Title – 0:55
2. The Accident – 1:53
3. Ann's Concern – 2:27
4. Running Away from the Truth – 5:13
5. Diagnosis – 2:46
6. In Your Hands – 1:38
7. Telling Ann the Truth – 3:57
8. Judy's Suspicions – 2:18
9. Prognosis Negative – 1:53
10. Oh! Give Me Time for Tenderness – 0:28
11. The Tack Room – 2:55
12. Ann Weeps Over Judy – 1:17
13. Fred Proposes to Judy – 3:06
14. Home in Vermont – 1:56
15. The End Is Near – 4:25
16. Our Victory Over the Dark – 5:01
17. End Cast – 0:28

Total Time: 38:76
