= Selena Royle =

American actress

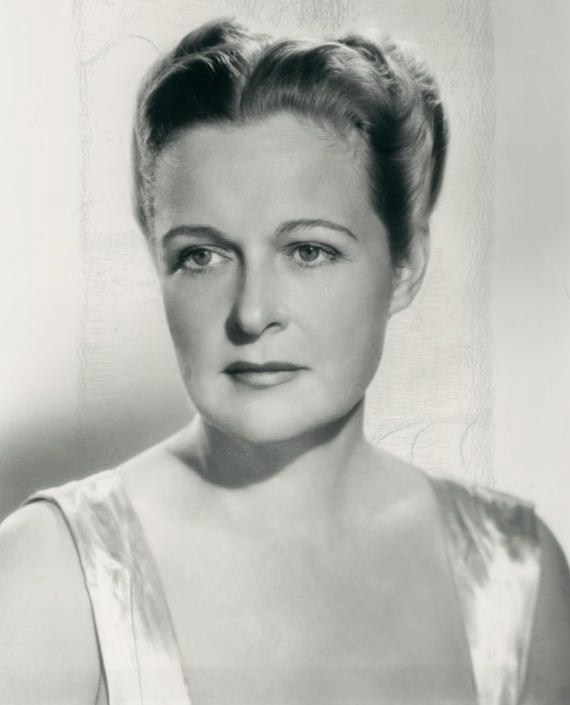
- Publicity still from 1948
- Born: November 6, 1904; New York City, New York, U.S.
- Died: April 23, 1983 (aged 78); Guadalajara, Jalisco, Mexico
- Other name: Selena Royale
- Occupations: Actress, writer
- Years active: 1921–1957
- Spouses: Earle Larrimore (m. 1932; div. 1942) Georges Renavent (m. 1948; died 1969)

Selena Royle (November 6, 1904 – April 23, 1983) was an American actress of stage, radio, television and film and later, an author.

== Early life and career ==
=== Early years ===
Royle was born in New York City to playwright Edwin Milton Royle and actress Selena Fetter. She had a sister, stage actress Josephine Royle.

Her mother recounted in a newspaper article that she used to take Selena along with her to her rehearsals and performances. One night, then seven-year-old Selena went missing. While the mother frantically searched for her, holding up act two, the audience became restless. The youngster finally turned up - she had gone on stage dressed in her mother's second-act costume; she made a bow, much to the audience's amusement. She later remarked, "And that is the first time I was ever on stage, and I liked it so well I stayed."

Royle was educated at The Low-Heywood School and the American Academy of Dramatic Art.

=== Actress ===
Her father wrote the 1921 Broadway play Lancelot and Elaine to provide both her and sister Josephine with their first professional roles, as Guinevere and Elaine respectively. Eventually, she landed a part on her own in the 1923 Theatre Guild production of Peer Gynt, with Joseph Schildkraut, and became a respected Broadway actress. She made one film in the 1930s, Misleading Lady, but otherwise worked on the stage and on radio.

Royle began her radio career in 1926 or 1927 and performed "almost continuously since", according to a 1939 newspaper item.

Her body of work includes playing the title role in Hilda Hope, M.D. She also played Martha Jackson in Woman of Courage, Mrs. Allen in Against the Storm, Joan in The O'Neills, and Mrs. Gardner in Betty and Bob, and appeared in Kate Hopkins, Angel of Mercy.

In the 1940s, she returned to film and had a successful run, mainly playing maternal characters such as the bereaved mother of The Fighting Sullivans (1944), mother to Jane Powell in the big screen adaptation of A Date with Judy (1948) and the title character's mother opposite Ingrid Bergman as Joan of Arc (1948).

=== HUAC ===
She made several appearances on early television. However, in 1951, she refused to testify before the House Un-American Activities Committee. She sued the American Legion, which had published Red Channels, in which her name was listed, and won but her acting career ended, her last film being Murder Is My Beat (1955).

=== Writer ===
She also wrote several books, including Guadalajara: as I Know It, Live It, Love It (which went through several editions) and a couple of cookbooks, and some magazine articles. She was the "radio editor" of the short-lived New York periodical Swank.

== Personal life and death ==
Royle married Earle Larimore, "prominent member of the Theater Guild", in Manhattan on May 31, 1932. He was a cousin of actress Laura Hope Crews. They divorced in 1942. She was married to actor Georges Renavent from 1948 until his death in 1969.

Royle died in Guadalajara, Jalisco, Mexico, on April 23, 1983, aged 78.

== Complete filmography ==
- The Misleading Lady (1932) as Alice Connell
- Stage Door Canteen (1943) as Selena Royle
- The Fighting Sullivans (1944) as Mrs. Alleta Sullivan
- Mrs. Parkington (1944) as Mattie Trounson
- Thirty Seconds Over Tokyo (1944) as Mrs. Reynolds
- This Man's Navy (1945) as Maude Weaver
- Main Street After Dark (1945) as 'Ma' Abby Dibson
- The Harvey Girls (1946) as Miss Bliss
- The Green Years (1946) as Mama Leckie
- Night and Day (1946) as Kate Porter
- Till the End of Time (1946) as Mrs. Kincheloe
- Courage of Lassie (1946) as Mrs. Merrick
- Gallant Journey (1946) as Mrs. Zachary Montgomery
- No Leave, No Love (1946) as Mrs. Hanlon
- The Romance of Rosy Ridge (1947) as Sairy MacBean
- Cass Timberlane (1947) as Louise Wargate
- You Were Meant for Me (1948) as Mrs. Cora Mayhew
- Summer Holiday (1948) as Mrs. Essie Miller
- Smart Woman (1948) as Mrs. Wayne
- A Date with Judy (1948) as Mrs. Dora Foster
- Moonrise (1948) as Aunt Jessie
- Joan of Arc (1948) as Isabelle d'Arc
- Bad Boy (1949) as Judge Florence Prentiss
- My Dream Is Yours (1949) as Freda Hofer
- You're My Everything (1949) as Mrs. Adams
- The Heiress (1949) as Elizabeth Almond
- The Damned Don't Cry (1950) as Patricia Longworth
- The Big Hangover (1950) as Kate Mahoney
- Branded (1950) as Mrs. Lavery
- He Ran All the Way (1951) as Mrs. Dobbs
- Come Fill the Cup (1951) as Mrs. Dolly Copeland
- I Lift Up My Lamp (1952, TV movie) as Cast Member
- Robot Monster (1953) as Mother
- The Good Samaritan (1954, TV movie) as Schoolteacher
- Murder Is My Beat (1955) as Beatrice Abbott

== See also ==
- Hollywood blacklist
