= The Squaw Man (play) =

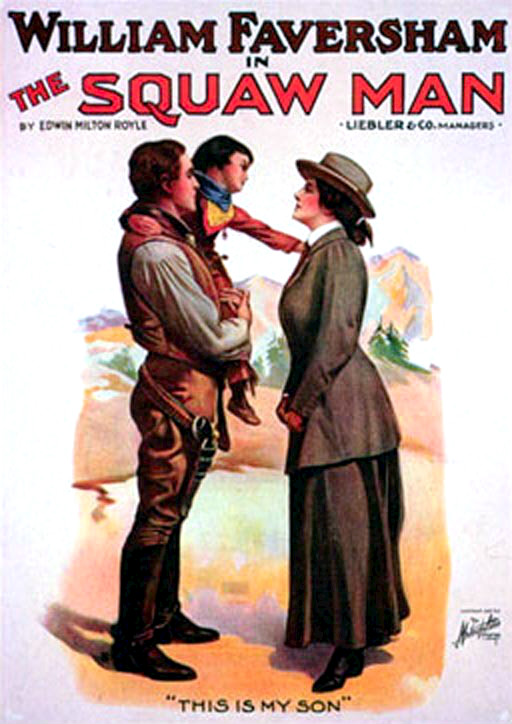
- Theatrical poster for The Squaw Man.
- Original language: English
- Written by: Edwin Milton Royle
- Characters: Capt. James Wynnegate aka Jim Carson; Nat-u-ritch
- Genre: Western/Drama
- Setting: American Old West

Premiere
- Date: October 23, 1905
- Place: Wallack's Theatre, Broadway

The Squaw Man is a 1905 western/drama stage play in four acts written by Edwin Milton Royle. It debuted on October 23, 1905, at the Wallack's Theatre, Broadway, starring William Faversham in the title role, as Captain James Wynnegate also known as Jim Carson. The doomed bad man, Cash Hawkins, was played by William S. Hart. Directed by Edwin Milton Royle and William Faversham, The Squaw Man was produced by Liebler & Company.

Receiving significant critical acclaim, the play ran for 222 performances before closing on April 1, 1906. The Squaw Man has had four Broadway revivals, in 1907, 1908, 1911 and 1921. The 1911 revival starring Dustin Farnum ran for only eight performances. The 1921 revival starring William Faversham at the Astor Theatre ran for 50 performances.

== Synopsis ==
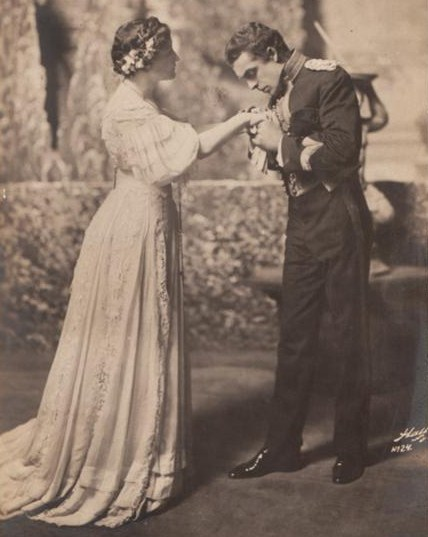
William Faversham and Selene Johnson

The first act of the play is set in England in the 19th century. The lead character is Capt. James Wynnegate. His older cousin, heir Henry Wynnegate, Earl of Kerhill, steals from the family trust fund and speculates heavily. Henry loses the fortune, causing them to default on a commitment to an orphans' home.

Capt. Wynnegate is in love with Henry's wife, Diana. She does not love her husband and returns the affection of the captain. As the money has been lost, Capt. Wynnegate agrees to leave England and take the blame. He is then accused of being a thief, which allows Henry to avoid suspicion and protects the name and the reputation of his wife.

He goes to the American "Wild West" of Montana, where he buys the Red Butte Ranch and makes a name for himself under the alias Jim Carson. In the second act, several years later, Henry and Diana show up. The villain, Cash Hawkins, is about to shoot Jim when the Ute Indian maiden, Nat-u-ritch, shoots Hawkins from the sidelines, killing him and saving Jim's life.

Nat-u-ritch, who is the daughter of Chief Tab-y-wana, rescues Jim several more times, which is revealed through exposition in the third act. They fall in love and have a son, Little Hal. Jim marries Nat-u-ritch. The marriage between a white man in his social position and an Indian woman causes controversy among the denizens of Montana.

By the fourth act, more time has passed and Diana comes West again with news that Henry has died. An English solicitor shows up and persuades Jim that Hal should be taken to England and raised as the heir to the large Wynnegate estate. Jim agrees to send the boy away.

Nat-u-ritch discusses the issue with Jim, believing that their child should be raised with their parents and insisting that the boy should remain in Montana. Nat-u-ritch's father, Chief Tab-y-wana, gives Jim advice on the dispute. At the first sign of Nat-u-ritch's complaints, the chief advises Jim that: "if she will not obey, beat her. If she disobeys again, kill her."

Knowing that Jim has made up his mind to send the boy to be raised on the Wynnegate estate, and hearing that she will be arrested by the Marshals for killing Hawkins, Nat-u-ritch commits suicide. Jim makes the decision to bring his child back home to England and marry Diana. The play concludes with the Indian chief Tab-y-wana standing stoically erect with the corpse of Nat-u-ritch in his arms, a reversal of the usual Pieta.

== Adaptations ==
The story has also been adapted into a novel, written by Julie Opp Faversham, a stage musical, and three films (1914, 1918 and 1931). All three films were directed by Cecil B. DeMille.

== Opening night cast ==
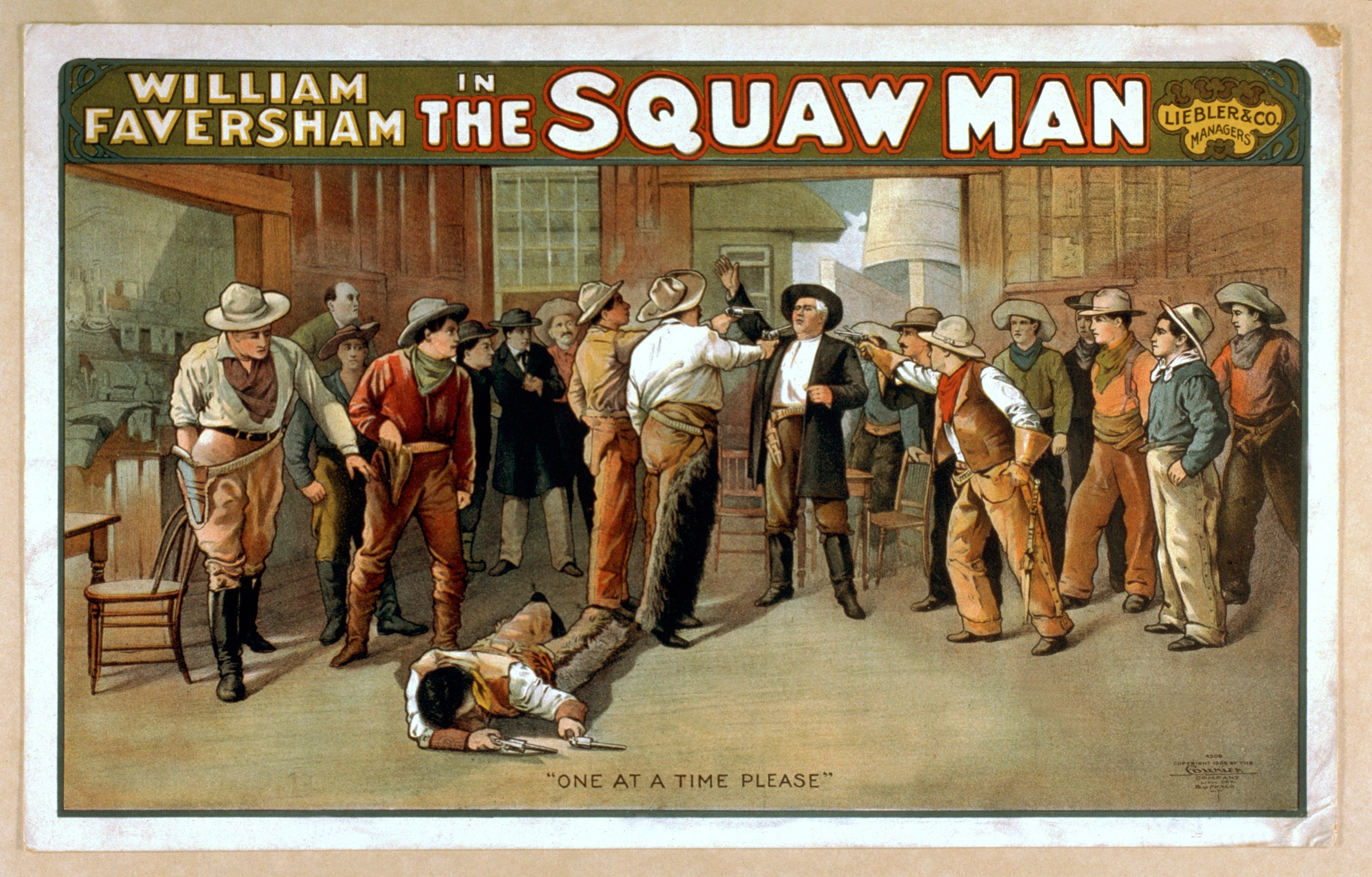
Poster for the original production of The Squaw Man (1905)

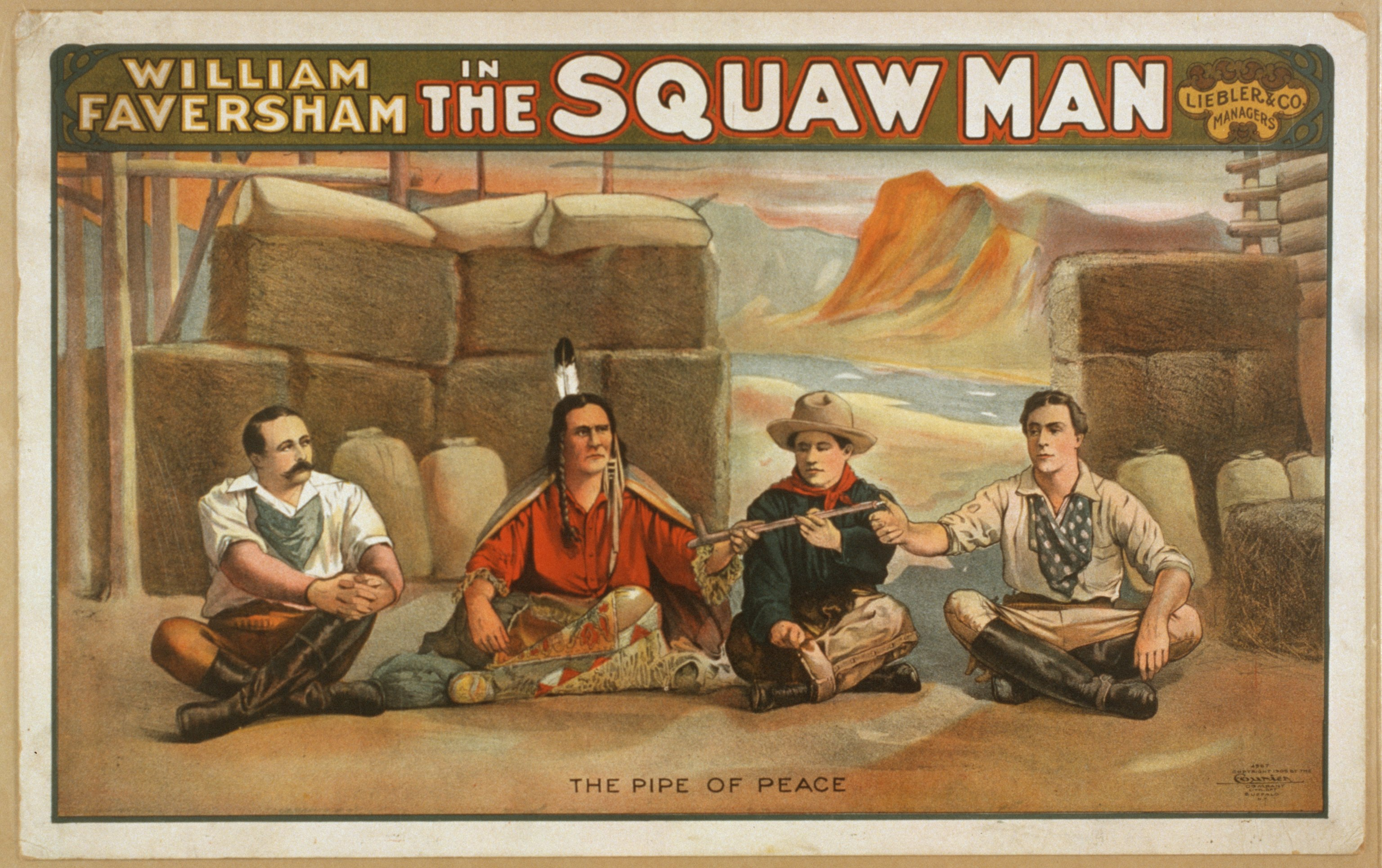
Poster for the original production of The Squaw Man (1905)

- Herbert Sleath as Henry Wynnegate
- Adrienne Morrison as Nat-u-ritch (as Mabel Morrison)
- Selene Johnson as Diana
- Selina F. Royle as Lady Elizabeth Wynnegate
- Katherine Fisher as Lady Mabel Wynnegate
- William Faversham as Capt. James Wynnegate
- Frederick Forrest as Rev. Belachazar Chiswick
- C. A. Carlton as Bates
- Hugo Toland as Malcolm Petrie
- Cecil Ward as Sir John Applegate
- William Elville as The Right Rev., Bishop of Exeter
- Brigham Royce as Sir Charles Majoribanks
- Ella Duncan as Mrs. Chichester Chichester Jones
- George Fawcett as Big Bill, foreman
- Emmett Shackelford as Shorty
- Bertram A. Marburg as Andy
- Mitchell Lewis as Grouchy
- Baco White as himself
- Theodore Roberts as Tab-y-wana
- Evelyn Wright as Little Hal
- William S. Hart as Cash Hawkins
- Frederick Watson as Nick, the bar-keep
- Mortimer Martini as McSorley
- Wells Edward Knibloe as Parker
- W. H. Sadler as Pete
- Chester White as Parson
- Joseph Judge as Punk
- Lillian Wright as Mrs. Hiram Doolittle
- Boyd Southey as Mr. Hiram Doolittle
- William Frederick as Bud Hardy
