= Dark Victory (play) =

1934 play by George Brewer Jr. and Bertram Bloch

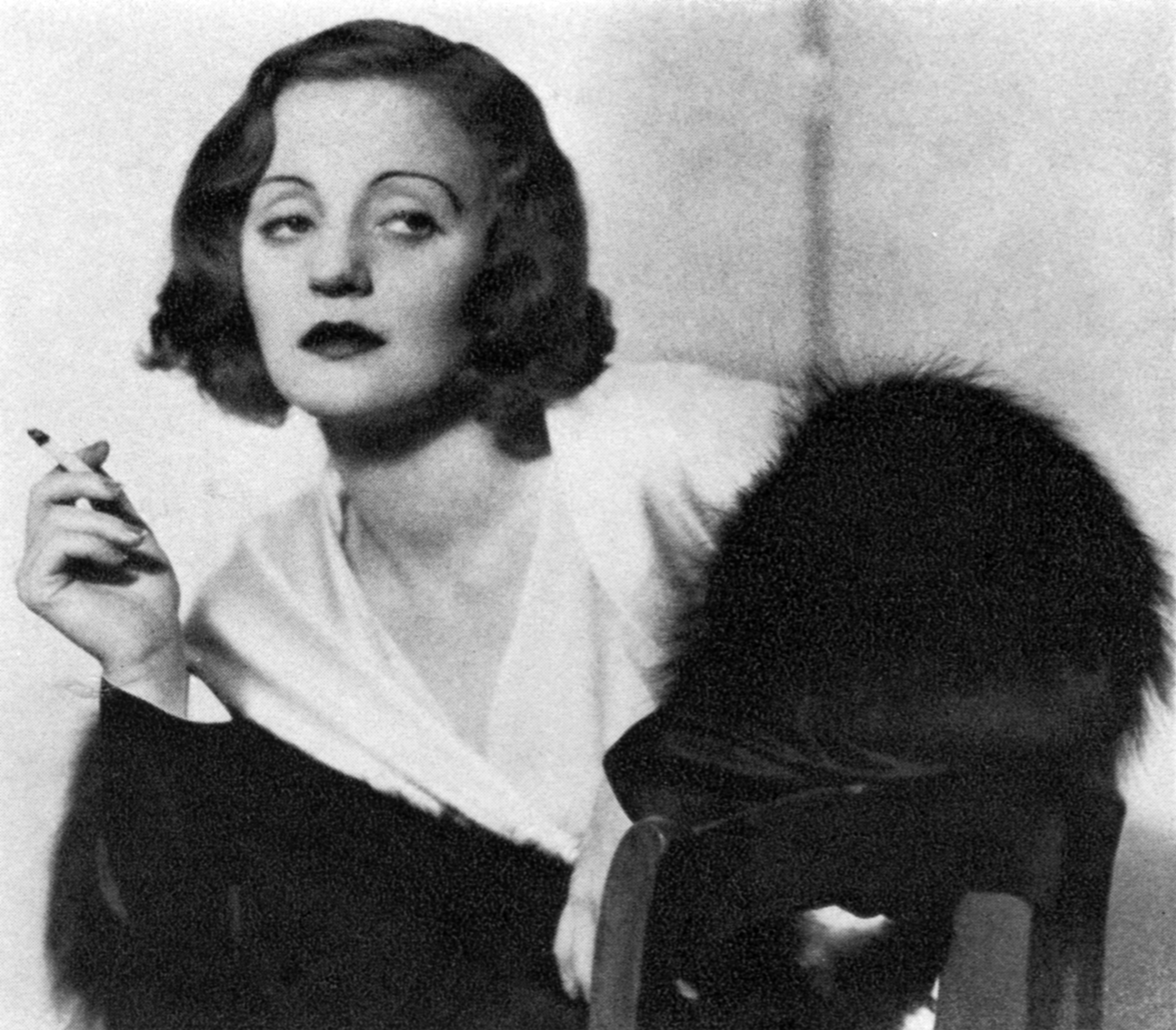
Tallulah Bankhead as Judith Traherne in the original Broadway production of Dark Victory (1934)

Dark Victory is a 1934 Broadway play written by George Brewer Jr. and Bertram Bloch starring Tallulah Bankhead. It premiered on November 9 at the Plymouth Theatre and ran until December 19.

== Plot ==
Judith Traherne is a Long Island socialite whose life is spent in frivolous, hedonistic pastimes. She indulges in alcohol and cigarettes, and enjoys horse riding. She experiences dizziness and headaches, and after an uncharacteristic riding accident, she is referred to a specialist, Dr. Frederick Steele. Steele is in the midst of closing his New York City office in preparation of a move to Brattleboro, Vermont, where he plans to devote his time to brain cell research. He reluctantly agrees to see Judith, who is initially antagonistic towards him. She shows signs of short-term memory loss, but dismisses these and other symptoms. Steele convinces her the ailments she is experiencing are serious and potentially life-threatening, and puts his career plans on hold to tend to her. Steele finds that she has an inoperable brain tumor, and predicts she has only a year to live. Shortly after becoming blind, she will die. Judith falls in love with the idealistic doctor, and they enjoy a brief respite in the Vermont countryside before she faces imminent death. She comes to the realization that their relationship has brought meaning to the life she had been leading.

== Cast ==
- Tallulah Bankhead as Judith Traherne
- Earle Larimore as Dr. Frederick Steele
- Ann Andrews as Alden Blaine
- Lewis Dayton as Postman
- Dwight Fiske as Leslie Clarke
- Myra Hampton as Josie
- Frederick Leister as Dr. Parsons
- Edgar Norfolk as Michael
- Helen Strickland as Miss Jenny
- Mildred Wall as Miss Wainwright

== Production ==
The property, described by Robert Benchley as "Camille without all the coughing" (the Lady of the Camellias has a long and agonizing death scene which was made famous by Sarah Bernhardt famously pathos-inspiring rendition of it, complete with coughing), had been floating around the entertainment capitals of both American coasts, and deficiencies in the script were acknowledged. Bankhead had read it and rejected it while she was still in Hollywood on her contract with Paramount Pictures. Katharine Hepburn had agreed to try it out in summer stock before changing her mind. When the script reached Bankhead again, Jock Whitney, wealthy industrialist and her sometimes-lover, assured her that the play's deficiencies were corrected as Maxwell Anderson had revised it. Tallulah was adept at glossing over the holes in a script and was determined to make a success of it for Whitney.

Robert Edmond Jones, who had designed the settings for John Barrymore's Richard III and Hamlet a decade earlier, did the set craft, and Bankhead's costumes were by Elsa Schiaparelli. Robert Milton directed the production. David O. Selznick was considering filming Dark Victory with Greta Garbo, but Bankhead was uninterested in serving as a dry run for another actress. She got a contract stipulation that if she did not play Judith Traherne on screen she would receive a percentage of the film sale.

After 51 performances, on December 20, 1934, it was the first sold-out performance since the opening night. But Bankhead awoke to find that she had lost her voice. Estelle Winwood, who'd spent the night at Bankhead's, called for a doctor. He instructed Bankhead to proceed to the theater and that he would meet her there, but by the time Bankhead reached the theater, her face was swelling rapidly. She was sent home and the matinee was canceled. Bankhead had contracted an infection that was then (before the advent of antibiotics) potentially deadly. Without Bankhead, Whitney was not interested in prolonging the run of Dark Victory, and it closed immediately.

== Reception ==
The play was generally received well critically, and Bankhead's acting was praised. However, the play was commercially unsuccessful.

Robert Garland in the Telegram, reviewing the play, wrote that Bankhead had acted with "unflagging skill". In the Sun, Richard Lockridge wrote: "Miss Bankhead gives an altogether admirable performance for the first sane act and a half. At odd moments even in the later difficult moments she brings into her playing a note of tense feeling which cuts through the theatricalism."

Percy Hammond of the Herald Tribune wrote of the scene where Judith, at her nadir, considers giving herself to the groom at her estate stables. "Miss Bankhead was gorgeously tempting and tempted, and for a moment or two many of us feared that she would request him to visit her in the middle of the night."

Regarding the lukewarm commercial reception, Variety speculated that Dark Victory was the right play at the wrong time (i.e., the Great Depression. Public audiences greatly preferred comedy, fantasy, and other escapist or light-hearted productions, over tragedies). "Tragedy has a place in the theatre, but it seems so much vexation has plagued the people that they prefer to be amused instead of going through an ordeal." The paper's "Ibee." reported that several spectators in the first-night audience had passed out in response to the intensely realistic medical examination Tallulah received in the opening scene.

== Adaptations ==
=== Film ===
Bette Davis starred in a 1939 film version with a vastly improved script, for which she received an Academy Award nomination. She had seen a performance of the play, and later admitted to emulating Bankhead in the role. In 1963, the film was remade as Stolen Hours with Susan Hayward and Michael Craig, directed by Daniel Petrie. The time frame was updated and the locale changed to England.

=== Radio ===
On April 4, 1938, Barbara Stanwyck and Melvyn Douglas starred in a 60-minute adaptation of the stage play on Lux Radio Theatre. Then, on January 8, 1940, Davis and Spencer Tracy performed a second adaptation on Lux Radio Theatre, this one based on the subsequent 1939 film. On March 6, 1952, CBS Radio's Hollywood Sound Stage aired a condensed 30-minute version starring Stanwyck and David Brian.

=== Television ===
In 1953, the film was remade under its original title for a TV adaptation for the Broadway Television Theatre, starring Sylvia Sidney, Christopher Plummer, and Ian Keith. In 1976, it was remade under its original title as an NBC television movie starring Elizabeth Montgomery as television producer Katherine Merrill under the care of Dr. Michael Grant, portrayed by Anthony Hopkins; this version was directed by Robert Butler.
