= Selene Johnson =

American actress (1876–1960)

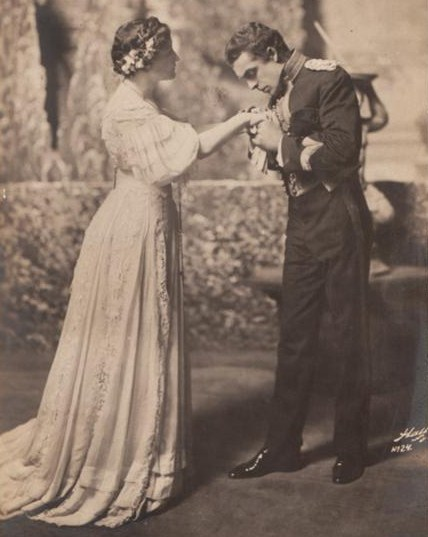
- Selene Johnson in The Squaw Man with William Faversham
- Born: Selene Knapp Johnson; February 20, 1876; Philadelphia, Pennsylvania, U.S.
- Died: December 11, 1960 (aged 84); Los Angeles, California, U.S.
- Occupation: Actress
- Spouse: Lumsden Hare

Selene Knapp Johnson (February 20, 1876 – December 11, 1960) was an American stage and silent film actress.

Johnson was born in Philadelphia, Pennsylvania but lived in Jersey City, New Jersey, later. In the mid-1890s she graduated from the American Academy of Dramatic Arts.

While Johnson was a student in the academy, she obtained the leading female role in The Girl I Left Behind Me. Another of her early performances was in The Great Diamond Robbery. Stock theater companies with which she worked included Acazar in San Francisco, Columbia Theatre in Washington, D. C., and Salisbury in Milwaukee.

Johnson performed in silent cinema, includingThe Divine Sacrifice (1918).

Johnson was married to Lumsden Hare, and she died in Los Angeles, California, US.

== Plays ==
- The Golden Age as Margaret Barnes (1928)
- The Title as Mrs. Culver (1921)
- Peter's Mother (1918)
- Ourselves (1913)
- The Return from Jerusalem (1912)
- The Dollar Mark (1909)
- Disengaged (1909)
- Irene Wycherley (1908)
- The Squaw Man (1905–1906)
- Abigail (1905)
- The Man of Destiny / How He Lied to Her Husband as herself (1904)
- Audrey (1902–1903)
- Frou-Frou (1902)
- Monte Cristo as Mercedes (1900–1901)
- A Rich Man's Son (1899)
- Peter Stuyvesant (1899)
