= S. N. Behrman =

American dramatist

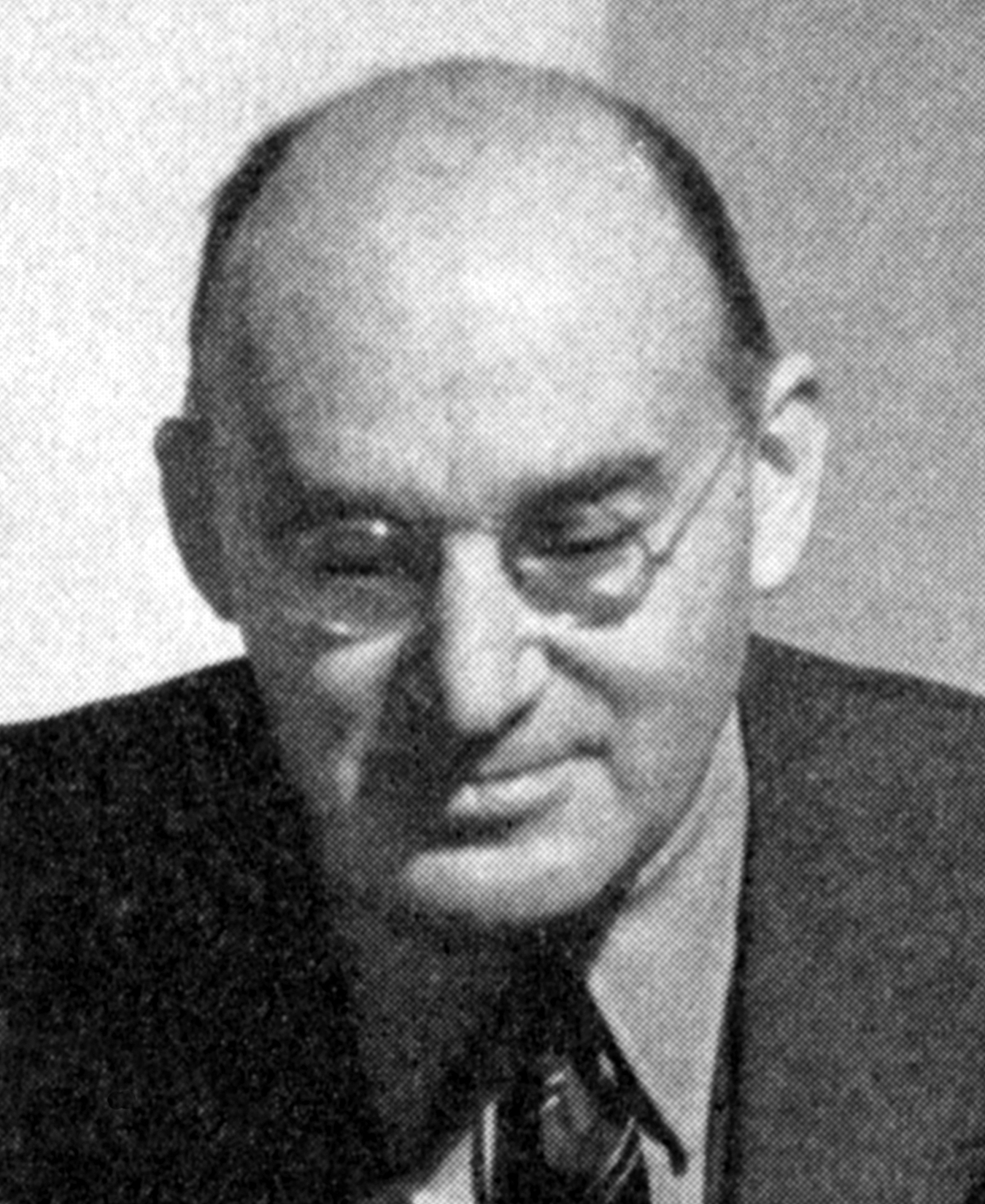
- S. N. Behrman in 1938
- Born: Samuel Nathaniel Behrman; June 9, 1893; Worcester, Massachusetts, U.S.
- Died: September 9, 1973 (aged 80); New York City, U.S.
- Education: Harvard University, B.A., Columbia University
- Occupations: Playwright; screenwriter; writer
- Years active: 1915–1972
- Children: David Behrman

Samuel Nathaniel Behrman (/ˈbɛərmən/; June 9, 1893 – September 9, 1973) was an American playwright, screenwriter, biographer, and longtime writer for The New Yorker. His son is the composer David Behrman.

== Biography ==
=== Early years ===
Behrman's parents, Zelda (Feingold) and Joseph Behrman, emigrated from what is now Lithuania to the United States, where Samuel Nathaniel Behrman was born, the youngest of three sons, in a tenement in Worcester, Massachusetts in 1893. His parents spoke little English, and his father was a Talmudic scholar. (Though known for his sophisticated comedies and worldly characters, Behrman fondly dramatized his family-centered, impoverished childhood in one of his last plays, the 1958 The Cold Wind And The Warm, an autobiographical drama starring Eli Wallach, Maureen Stapleton, and Morris Carnovsky.) His own path, however, took him far from the Orthodox world of his parents.

A schoolmate and intimate friend, Daniel Asher, brought him to the theater when he was eleven to see Devil's Island, inspiring in him a love of the stage. "When he was a boy, Behrman saw all the famous plays and players of the first decade [of the twentieth century] as an usher in a Worcester theater." At fifteen, he ran away from home with another schoolmate for four days and stayed in New York City. Life in Worcester began to appear increasingly limited. At seventeen, he saw a production of George Bernard Shaw's Caesar and Cleopatra at Boston's Park Street Theatre that determined him on his course; that play "seduced me to the theatre," he later remarked. After graduating from high school, Behrman attempted a career as an actor on the vaudeville circuit. Bad health forced him to quit, and he returned home to Worcester and attended Clark University. There he studied under the noted psychologist G. Stanley Hall and heard Sigmund Freud lecture on his 1909 American tour. He immersed himself in the plays of Ibsen, Strindberg, Shaw, Arthur Pinero, and Maurice Maeterlinck.

=== College ===
College was a mixed experience for Behrman. He was repeatedly suspended for failing mandatory physical education classes. Daniel Asher, who devotedly believed in his friend's future, urged Behrman to take courses at nearby Harvard University. There he enrolled in an English composition class with the renowned writing instructor, Charles Townsend Copeland. He was suspended at Clark again in his sophomore year, at which time he transferred to Harvard. (in 1949, Clark University awarded Behrman an honorary degree.) While in Copeland's class in 1915, he sold a short story to the magazine The Parisienne. He then submitted one of his dramatic manuscripts to George Pierce Baker, whose playwriting workshop was one of the university's most respected courses. (Other famous alumni of the class include Eugene O'Neill, Thomas Wolfe, Sidney Howard, and Philip Barry.) Baker was impressed with Behrman's student work. In the New York Tribune nineteen years later, he would title an essay "Baker's Last Drama Lecture: From Aeschylus to Behrman," in tribute to his famous student. In 1916, Behrman was the only undergraduate in the legendary "47 Workshop" playwriting class, where he studied George Meredith's comedy. He earned his B.A. at Harvard and went on to graduate studies at Columbia University.

While at Columbia, where he received his M.A. in 1918, Behrman studied under the noted theater critic and historian Brander Matthews. He was supported for a time by his brothers Hiram and Morris, who ran a successful accounting firm and who were willing to help their younger brother complete his education and try to establish himself as a writer. Living in a cold-water flat in Manhattan, Behrman worked in his twenties as a book reviewer, newspaper interviewer, and press agent, collaborated on three undistinguished plays, and published short stories in several magazines, including The Smart Set, the monthly edited by H.L. Mencken and George Jean Nathan. His first play under his own name, The Second Man, was a dramatization of a story he had written for The Smart Set in 1919 and, when produced by the Theater Guild in 1927, made his reputation. Noël Coward, who became a friend, acted in the London production.

=== Writing career ===
From the late 1920s through the 1940s, S. N. Behrman was considered one of Broadway's leading authors of "high comedy," was often produced by the famous Theatre Guild, and wrote for such stars as Ina Claire, Katharine Cornell, Jane Cowl, and the acting team of Alfred Lunt and Lynn Fontanne, who became his good friends. One journalist remembered him from this period as "slim, dark-eyed, curly-haired...with the brooding melancholy of a young Jewish intellectual." Theater critic and historian Brooks Atkinson described Behrman as "one of the Guild's most adored authors." Along with Elmer Rice, Maxwell Anderson, Robert E. Sherwood, and Sidney Howard, he was later one of the five founding members of the Playwright's Company. Among his greatest Broadway successes were Biography (1932), End of Summer (1936), and No Time for Comedy (1939). His stage adaptation of Enid Bagnold's novel Serena Blandish became a success for actress Ruth Gordon. A well-read man of wide culture, he also adapted plays by Jean Giraudoux and Marcel Achard and "Jane," a short story by his good friend W. Somerset Maugham. With composer Harold Rome, he adapted Marcel Pagnol's Fanny trilogy into a musical play for the stage. His 1942 Broadway play, The Pirate, was turned into a musical for the film version in 1948, also called The Pirate.

In Hollywood, Behrman enjoyed a lucrative second career as a screenwriter. He wrote screenplays for Greta Garbo, including Queen Christina, Conquest, and her final film, Two-Faced Woman. With Sonya Levien, he co-wrote the screen play for the 1930 film version of Ferenc Molnár's Liliom, starring Charles Farrell and Rose Hobart. His experiences in Hollywood found dramatic form in the play Let Me Hear the Melody (1951), a failure that closed in pre-Broadway tryouts. He also collaborated on the screenplays for Anna Karenina (1935), A Tale of Two Cities (1935), and Waterloo Bridge (1940).

Berhman's comedies repeatedly celebrate tolerance, yet show how tolerant people in their generosity are often vulnerable when confronted by fanatics or ruthless opportunists. In End of Summer, a liberal household is threatened by a devious psychoanalyst who is able to play upon the family's weaknesses in his desire for wealth and power. Behrman's protagonists often feel inadequate to deal with the evils and injustices in the world. The hero of No Time for Comedy, a successful author of stylish comedies for his actress-wife, feels the need to write a serious play in response to the Spanish Civil War. When he fails at this attempt, he resolves to go to Spain himself and fight. The play asks the question: Is there a place for comedy in a violent and unjust world? The protagonist of Biography laments a political landscape that is divided between left- and right-wing extremes, leaving little space for a tolerant, humane middle ground.

Behrman's columns for The New Yorker included profiles of such notable figures as composer George Gershwin, Hungarian playwright Ferenc Molnár, Zionist leader Chaim Weizmann and entertainer Eddie Cantor as well as longer pieces that became highly regarded biographies of writer and dandy Max Beerbohm and art dealer Joseph Duveen. His autobiographical essays, also serialized in The New Yorker, appeared in two volumes, The Worcester Account (1955) and People in a Diary (1972). He was elected a Fellow of the American Academy of Arts and Sciences in 1959.

Behrman was known for his warm, witty personality and enjoyed good relations with many other writers, both in and out of the theater world. A newspaper interview he conducted with Siegfried Sassoon, when the British poet was visiting New York after World War I, led to a lifelong friendship and many visits to Sassoon's country house when Behrman was in England. While not gay himself, Behrman was especially supportive of the tribulations of Sassoon's always turbulent love life. Work on dramatizing a short story by Somerset Maugham led to a relaxed, bantering relationship with that British writer as well and many visits to Maugham's home on the Riviera. Publisher Bennett Cerf repeatedly urged Behrman to write a biography of Maugham, feeling that he knew him as well as anyone. It was a project Behrman toyed with throughout the 1960s, but ultimately declined on the advice of New Yorker editor William Shawn. When in Italy, he was a welcome guest of Max Beerbohm, whose biography he wrote in 1960, four years after Beerbohm's death.

== Major works ==
Behrman's two most anthologized plays, which continued to be revived in regional theaters through the twentieth century, are Biography (1932) and End of Summer (1936). Like many of Behrman's plays, they are character studies more than plot-filled dramas.

Biography tells the story of Marion Froude, a noted portrait painter, who has been prevailed upon by an abrasive leftwing publisher, Richard Kurt, to write her serialized memoirs for his magazine. A former lover with senatorial aspirations, Leander Nolan, hopes to marry into a conservative, politically well-placed southern family. He wants Marion to abandon the project, fearing that he will be named in her book and his plans derailed. A liberal woman who has painted both Roman Catholic prelates and Lenin himself, Marion must choose (she destroys her manuscript in the end), but is ultimately alienated by both Kurt's proletarian rigidity and Leander's smug conservatism. Biography starred Ina Claire and ran on Broadway for 219 performances.

End of Summer is about three women of different generations and values: forty-ish Leonie Frothingham, her elderly mother, and her nineteen-year-old daughter, Paula. The three women, insulated from the Depression and its harsh realities by their money, live in summer comfort on an estate in Maine. A visiting psychiatrist disrupts their complacency. He is attracted to both the divorced Leonie and her daughter but schemes to marry Leonie to gain control of her money, until his plan is revealed by Paula. Other characters, including a young man romantically attached to Paula and a Russian emigre-friend of the family, visit the house and talk about their lives, aspirations, and political leanings. Will, Paula's potential fiancé, cannot reconcile his activist politics with the thought of marrying into a family with so much money. One writer described End of Summer as "a Chekhovian play which emphasizes the disappearance or demise of an old, conservative order [represented by Leonie's mother] and the emergence of the new, more radical way of American life." The play also starred Ina Claire and ran on Broadway for 153 performances.

People in a Diary (1972), a memoir, could also be regarded as a major Behrman work and a well-crafted example of its genre. Published eighteen years after his first memoir, The Worcester Account, it is a collection of autobiographical essays and sketches culled from the sixty volumes of diaries Behrman had been keeping since his time at Harvard in 1915. "An odd quirk of destiny has put a great many people in my way," he wrote in a significant understatement, declaring that his purpose in the book was to "revive their society" and the vibrant times they had shared. The cast of characters in People in a Diary gives an idea of the breadth and depth of Behrman's life: e.g., Greta Garbo, Laurence Olivier, Louis B. Mayer, Jean Giradoux, Somerset Maugham, Eugene O'Neill, Noël Coward, Maxwell Anderson, Elmer Rice, Sidney Howard, Felix Frankfurter, Bernard Berenson, the Gershwins, and the Marx Brothers. The book also contains some biting observations about the direction modern America had taken in the 1960s as it waged war in Vietnam and became more obsessed with money and imperial ambitions.

== Death ==
S. N. Behrman died in September 1973 at the age of 80. He was survived by his wife, Elza Heifetz Behrman, the sister of violinist Jascha Heifetz, whom he had married in his forties, and a son, composer David Behrman. His stepdaughter was Barbara Gelb, the biographer, along with her husband, Arthur Gelb, of Eugene O'Neill. Brooks Atkinson wrote of Behrman, "[His] ethical and political principles have never been appreciated. It is an ancient rule that prizes are not given to comic plays about serious subjects. The court jester invariably ranks with dilettantes and flaneurs." In Atkinson's view, this "short, rounded, merry, owlish-looking...marvelously erudite and civilized" man was far more than merely a writer of Broadway entertainments. His widow died in 1998 aged 92.

== Bibliography ==
=== Plays ===
- Bedside Manners (1923), with J. Kenyon Nicholson
- A Night's Work (1924), with Nicholson
- The Man Who Forgot (1926), with Owen Davis
- The Second Man (1927)
- Love Is Like That (1927), with Nicholson
- Serena Blandish (or The Difficulty of Getting Married)(1929)
- Meteor (1929)
- Brief Moment (1931)
- Biography (1932)
- Love Story (1933)
- Rain From Heaven (1934)
- End of Summer (1936)
- Amphitryon 38 (1937)
- Wine of Choice (1938)
- No Time for Comedy (1939)
- The Talley Method (1941)
- The Pirate (1942)
- Jacobowsky and the Colonel (1944) (adaptation of the play Jakobowsky und der Oberst by Franz Werfel)
- Dunnigan's Daughter (1945)
- Jane (1946)
- I Know My Love (1949)
- Let Me Hear the Melody (1951)
- Fanny (musical) (1954), with Joshua Logan
- The Cold Wind And The Warm (1958)
- Lord Pengo (1962)
- But For Whom Charlie (1964)

=== Books ===
- Duveen: The Story of the Most Spectacular Art Dealer of All Time. (1952)
- The Worcester Account (1955)
- Portrait of Max: An Intimate Memoir of Sir Max Beerbohm (1960)
- People in a Diary: A Memoir (1972)

=== Screenplays ===
- He Knew Women (1930)
- Liliom (1930), with Sonya Levien
- Lightning (1930), with Levien
- The Sea-Wolf (1930)
- The Brat (1931), with Levien
- Surrender (1931), with Levien
- Daddy Long Legs (1931), with Levien
- Rebecca of Sunnybrook Farm (1932), with Levien
- Tess of the Storm Country (1932), with Levien
- Brief Moment (1933)
- Hallelujah, I'm a Bum (1933)
- As Husbands Go (1933)
- My Lips Betray (1933)
- Queen Christina (1933)
- Biography of a Bachelor Girl (1934)
- Anna Karenina (1935)
- A Tale of Two Cities (1935)
- Conquest (1937)
- Parnell (1937)
- The Cowboy and the Lady (1938)
- No Time for Comedy (1940)
- Waterloo Bridge (1940)
- Two-Faced Woman (1941)
- The Pirate (1948)
- Quo Vadis (1951)
- Me and the Colonel (1958)
- Fanny (1961)
- Stowaway in the Sky (1962)

== Sources ==
- Atkinson, Brooks. Broadway. New York: Atheneum, 1970.
- Gross, Robert F. S. N. Behrman: A Research and Production Sourcebook. Greenwich, CT: Greenwood Press, 1992.
- Mordden, Ethan. All That Glittered: The Golden Age of Drama on Broadway, 1919-1959. New York: St. Martin's Press, 2007.
- Reed, Kenneth T. S. N. Behrman. Twayne Publishers, 1975.
