= Stolen Hours =

1963 film by Daniel Petrie

- Movie poster
- Directed by: Daniel Petrie
- Screenplay by: Jessamyn West
- Story by: Joseph Hayes
- Based on: Dark Victory; 1934 play by George Emerson Brewer, Jr. Bertram Bloch
- Produced by: Denis Holt
- Starring: Susan Hayward; Michael Craig; Diane Baker
- Cinematography: Harry Waxman
- Edited by: Geoffrey Foot
- Music by: Mort Lindsey
- Production company: The Mirisch Corporation
- Distributed by: United Artists
- Release date: October 2, 1963 (US)
- Running time: 97 minutes
- Countries: United Kingdom; United States
- Language: English

Stolen Hours (U.S. title Summer Flight) is a 1963 British-American drama film directed by Daniel Petrie and starring Susan Hayward, Michael Craig, Edward Judd and Diane Baker. It was written by Jessamyn West and Joseph Hayes based on the 1934 play Dark Victory by George Emerson Brewer, Jr. and Bertram Bloch.

The film is a remake of the 1939 film Dark Victory (1939), with Bette Davis, with the time period updated and the setting changed to England. It was shot at Shepperton Studios and on location around Britain, including at Polruan in Cornwall.

A socialite with a brain tumor falls in love with her surgeon's colleague.

== Plot ==
Laura Pember, a neurotic jet-setting socialite, is diagnosed with a brain tumor and told that she has only a year left to live. She falls in love with Dr. John Carmody and struggles to turn her life around before she dies.

== Cast ==
- Susan Hayward as Laura Pember
- Michael Craig as Dr. John Carmody
- Diane Baker as Ellen
- Edward Judd as Mike Bannerman
- Paul Rogers as Dr. Eric McKenzie
- Robert Bacon as Peter
- Paul Stassino as Dalporto
- Jerry Desmonde as Colonel
- Ellen McIntosh as Miss Kendall
- Gwen Nelson as hospital Sister
- Peter Madden as Reynolds
- Joan Young as Mrs. Lambert
- Joan Newell as Mrs. Hewitt
- Chet Baker as himself

== Reception ==
The Monthly Film Bulletin wrote: "From its twee opening titles to the final shot of Susan Hayward snuggling cosily down for the Big Sleep, this remake of Dark Victory is old-wave Hollywood hokum at its phoniest, though with some characteristically native touches of amateurishness and ineptitude. ... Susan Hayward has a brave stab at doing a Bette Davis, but her dramatic range is considerably less varied and impressive than her wardrobe, while a sheepish Michael Craig and a glib Edward Judd offer little support. The nicest thing about the film, in fact, is the charm and sincerity of Diane Baker, who even succeeds at times in injecting some genuine emotion into this otherwise tired and tiresome tear-jerker."

Variety wrote: "Female audiences haven't had a good cry for a while, which will be remedied by Stolen Hours. A remake of the 1939 Bette Davis starter Dark Victory, this affords Susan Hayward a performance which will surely arouse the sympathies of her femme viewers. Husbands should perhaps take that night for poker. ... Photography, under the direction of Harry Waxman, is colorful and scenically often quite beautiful, a factor which adds considerably to the picture's overall effectiveness. Mort Lindsey's music also adds to the impact and other credits like Wilfred Shingleton's production designs, Beatrice Dawson's costuming and Geoffrey Foote's editing are all strong. Hours is a stylish picture in design and follows the hanky formula to perfection without overdoing."
