= Edwin Milton Royle =

American dramatist

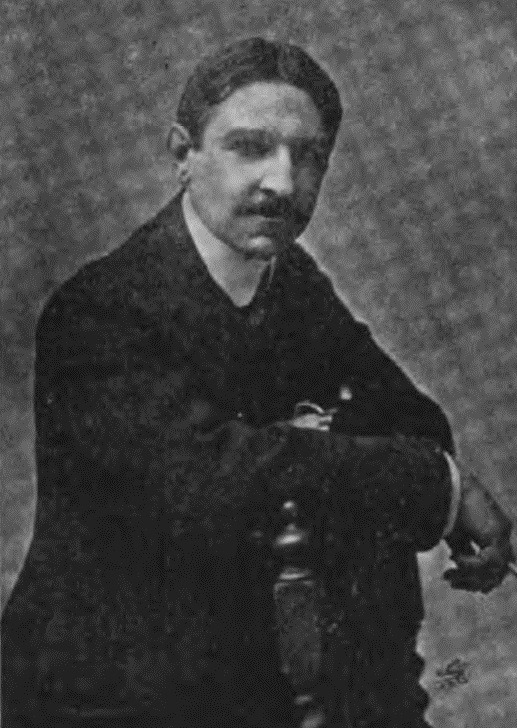
Edwin Milton Royle

Edwin Milton Royle (March 2, 1862 – February 16, 1942) was an American playwright. He was born in Lexington, Missouri, and died in New York City. Over 30 of his plays were performed. His best-known play is The Squaw Man (1905), which became the first Hollywood film co-directed by Cecil B. DeMille in 1914.

California Motion Picture Company made a film adaptation of his play "Unwritten Law" (Unwritten Law (1916 film)).

He married actress Selena Fetter in 1892. They had two daughters, and lived in Darien, Connecticut, after 1910. Their daughter Selena Royle (1904–1983) was a successful stage and film actress.
