= Earle Larimore =

American actor

- Born: Eugene Earle Larimore; August 2, 1899; Portland, Oregon, U.S.
- Died: October 22, 1947 (aged 48); New York City, U.S.
- Occupation: Actor
- Spouse: Selena Royle (m. 1932; div. 1942)

Eugene Earle Larimore (August 2, 1899 – October 22, 1947) was an American stage and film actor.

== Biography ==
Larimore was born in Portland, Oregon, in 1899. He was a cousin of actress Laura Hope Crews. He began his career as a stage actor, appearing on Broadway in various plays, such as Made in America (1925), and The Love City (1926). In 1932, he starred opposite Ruth Gordon in William Cotton's The Bride the Sun Shines On at the Cape Playhouse in Dennis, Massachusetts, and as Orin Mannon in the original Broadway production of Mourning Becomes Electra. The same year, Larimore married actress Selena Royle. He starred opposite Tallulah Bankhead in the Broadway production of Dark Victory in 1934.

In 1935, Larimore and Royle formed the University Players repertory company at the Ford's Theatre in Washington, D.C. Larimore and Royle eventually divorced in 1942. Larimore died in New York City on October 22, 1947.

== Filmography ==
Year	Title	Role	Notes	Ref.
1926	The Kick-Off	Frank Preston		
1928	Inspiration	Jimmie		

== Stage credits ==
Year	Title	Role	Notes	Ref.
1925	Made in America	Bill Pickering	Cort Theatre	
1926	The Love City	Richard Cavendish	Little Theatre	
1926	Nirvana	Bill Weed	Greenwich Village Theatre	
1926	Ned McCobb's Daughter	George Callahan	John Golden Theatre	
1926	Juarez and Maximilian	Stephen Herzfield	Guild Theatre	
1926–1927	The Silver Cord	Robert	John Golden Theatre	
1927	The Second Man	Austin Lowe	Guild Theatre	
1928	Strange Interlude	Sam Evans	John Golden Theatre	
1928	Man's Estate	Jerry Jordan	Biltmore Theatre	
1930	Marco Millions	Marco Polo	Liberty Theatre	
1930	Volpone	Mosca	Liberty Theatre	
1930	Hotel Universe	Norman Ross	Martin Beck Theatre	
1931	Mélo	Pierre Belcroix	Ethel Barrymore Theatre	
1931	The Second Man		Cape Playhouse (Dennis, Massachusetts)	
1931	A Church Mouse		Cape Playhouse (Dennis, Massachusetts)	
1931	The Bride the Sun Shines On		Cape Playhouse (Dennis, Massachusetts)	
1932	Mourning Becomes Electra	Orin Mannon	Guild Theatre	
1932–1933	Biography	Richard Kurt	Guild Theatre	
1934	Days Without End	John	Henry Miller's Theatre	
1934	Too Many Boats	Captain "Cork" Coates	Playhouse Theatre	
1934	Dark Victory	Dr. Frederick Steele	Plymouth Theatre	
1935	It's You I Want	Sheridan Delaney	Cort Theatre	
1935	To See Ourselves	Michael Dennison	Ethel Barrymore Theatre	
1935	As Husbands Go		Berkshire Theatre Festival	
1935	Abide With Me	Henry Marsden	Ritz Theatre	
1946–1947	The Iceman Cometh	Willie Oban	Martin Beck Theatre	
