= List of pre-Code films =

Pre-Code Hollywood is the era in the American film industry after the introduction of sound (talkies) in the early 1920s and the enforcement of the Motion Picture Production Code (Hays Code) censorship guidelines. Although the Code was adopted in 1930, oversight was poor and it did not become effectively enforced until July 1, 1934. Before that date, movie content was restricted more by local laws, negotiations between the Studio Relations Committee (SRC) and the major studios, and popular opinion than strict adherence to the Hays Code, which was often ignored by Hollywood filmmakers.

The criterion for inclusion on this list is the direct mention or discussion of the film as pre-Code in a mainstream source.

== Films ==
=== 1928 ===
- Lights of New York

=== 1929 ===
- Alibi
- Applause
- The Awful Truth
- Big News
- Big Time
- The Black Watch
- Broadway
- The Broadway Melody
- Bulldog Drummond
- The Canary Murder Case
- Captain Lash
- Careers
- Close Harmony
- The Cock-Eyed World
- The Cocoanuts
- Condemned
- Coquette
- Dance Hall
- The Delightful Rogue
- The Desert Song
- Devil-May-Care
- Diary of a Lost Girl
- The Flying Fleet
- Footlights and Fools
- The Four Feathers
- Gold Diggers of Broadway
- Glorifying the American Girl
- The Great Gabbo
- Half Marriage
- Hallelujah
- Hell's Heroes
- Her Private Life
- High Voltage
- The Hole in the Wall
- The Idle Rich
- In Old Arizona
- The Lady Lies
- The Last of Mrs. Cheyney
- The Letter
- The Locked Door
- Lucky Star
- Madame X
- Marianne (musical)
- The Mysterious Dr. Fu Manchu
- Our Modern Maidens
- The Pagan
- Painted Faces
- Pointed Heels
- The Racketeer
- Redskin
- Rio Rita
- The River
- Sally
- Salute
- Street Girl
- The Saturday Night Kid
- Seven Footprints to Satan
- The Single Standard
- The Squall
- Sunny Side Up
- Their Own Desire
- The Thirteenth Chair
- This Thing Called Love
- Thunderbolt
- The Trespasser
- The Trial of Mary Dugan
- Untamed
- The Valiant
- The Virginian
- Voice of the City
- Where East Is East
- The Wild Party
- The Wolf of Wall Street
- The Wolf Song

=== 1930 ===
- Africa Speaks
- All Quiet on the Western Front
- Animal Crackers
- Anna Christie
- Anybody's Woman
- The Arizona Kid
- The Bad Man
- The Big House
- The Bat Whispers
- Beau Bandit
- The Big Pond
- The Big Trail
- Billy the Kid
- The Bishop Murder Case
- The Blue Angel
- Born Reckless
- Bride of the Regiment
- Bright Lights
- Call of the Flesh
- Captain Thunder
- Charley's Aunt
- Chasing Rainbows
- Cheer Up and Smile
- Children of Pleasure
- City Girl
- Clancy in Wall Street
- Conspiracy
- The Cuckoos
- Danger Lights
- The Dawn Patrol
- The Devil to Pay!
- A Devil with Women
- The Devil's Holiday
- Dixiana
- The Divorcee
- The Doorway to Hell
- Doughboys
- Du Barry, Woman of Passion
- Fast and Loose
- Feet First
- Follow Thru
- For the Defense
- Golden Dawn
- Good News
- The Green Goddess
- Half Shot at Sunrise
- Hell Harbor
- Hell's Angels
- Hell's Heroes
- High Society Blues
- Hold Everything
- Holiday
- In Gay Madrid
- Inside the Lines
- Just Imagine
- King of Jazz
- Kismet
- Ladies Love Brutes
- Ladies of Leisure
- The Lady of Scandal
- The Lash
- Laughter
- Leathernecking
- Let Us Be Gay
- Let's Go Native
- The Life of the Party
- Liliom
- Loose Ankles
- The Lottery Bride
- The Love Parade
- Madame Satan
- Mammy
- The Man from Blankley's
- Manslaughter
- The Matrimonial Bed
- Maybe It's Love
- The Melody Man
- Men Without Women
- Min and Bill
- Moby Dick
- Montana Moon
- Monte Carlo
- Morocco
- Murder!
- New Moon
- No, No, Nanette
- Not So Dumb
- The Office Wife
- Oh Sailor Behave
- One Night at Susie's
- One Romantic Night
- Our Blushing Brides
- Outward Bound
- Paid
- The Pay-Off
- Paramount on Parade
- Peacock Alley
- Playing Around
- Puttin' On the Ritz
- Queen High
- Raffles
- Reaching for the Moon
- Redemption
- Renegades
- Road to Paradise
- Romance
- The Rogue Song
- Rough Romance
- The Royal Family of Broadway
- The Runaway Bride
- Safety in Numbers
- Sarah and Son
- The Second Floor Mystery
- She Couldn't Say No
- Show Girl in Hollywood
- The Silver Horde
- Sin Takes a Holiday
- The Sins of the Children
- Sinners' Holiday
- Slightly Scarlet
- Son of the Gods
- Song of the Flame
- Song of the West
- The Spoilers
- Street of Chance
- Strictly Unconventional
- Sunny
- Sweet Kitty Bellairs
- They Learned About Women
- Three Faces East
- Tol'able David
- True to the Navy
- The Truth About Youth
- Under a Texas Moon
- Up the River
- The Unholy Three
- The Vagabond King
- Viennese Nights
- The Virtuous Sin
- War Nurse
- Way for a Sailor
- What a Widow!
- The Woman Racket
- Whoopee!
- Young Man of Manhattan

=== 1931 ===
- Alexander Hamilton
- Ambassador Bill
- An American Tragedy
- Arizona
- Arrowsmith
- Bachelor Apartment
- Bad Company
- Bad Girl
- Bad Sister
- Beyond Victory
- Big Business Girl
- The Blonde Captive
- Blonde Crazy
- Body and Soul
- Born to Love
- Bought!
- Broadminded
- Captain Applejack
- Caught Plastered
- The Champ
- Chances
- The Cheat
- Cimarron
- City Lights
- City Streets
- The Common Law
- Compromised
- Confessions of a Co-Ed
- A Connecticut Yankee
- Cracked Nuts
- The Criminal Code
- Dance, Fools, Dance
- Daybreak
- Delicious
- Dirigible
- Dishonored
- Dr. Jekyll and Mr. Hyde
- Dracula
- The Easiest Way
- Everything's Rosie
- Expensive Women
- Fifty Million Frenchmen
- Fighting Caravans
- Five and Ten
- Five Star Final
- Flying High
- Frankenstein
- A Free Soul
- Friends and Lovers
- The Front Page
- The Gay Diplomat
- Gentleman's Fate
- Girls About Town
- Girls Demand Excitement
- God's Gift to Women
- Goldie
- The Great Lover
- The Guilty Generation
- Guilty Hands
- Hell Divers
- Her Majesty, Love
- His Woman
- A Holy Terror
- Honor Among Lovers
- A House Divided
- Hush Money
- I Like Your Nerve
- I Take This Woman
- Illicit
- Indiscreet
- Inspiration
- Iron Man
- It Pays to Advertise
- Kept Husbands
- Kick In
- Kiki
- Ladies' Man
- Ladies of the Big House
- The Lady Refuses
- The Last Flight
- Laughing Sinners
- Little Caesar
- Local Boy Makes Good
- Lonely Wives
- M
- The Mad Genius
- The Mad Parade
- Mädchen in Uniform
- Maker of Men
- The Maltese Falcon
- Man of the World
- The Man Who Came Back
- Manhattan Parade
- Mata Hari
- Men Call It Love
- Men of Chance
- Merely Mary Ann
- Millie
- The Millionaire
- The Miracle Woman
- Monkey Business
- Morals for Women
- Never the Twain Shall Meet
- Night Nurse
- No Limit
- Once a Lady
- Other Men's Women
- Palmy Days
- Peach O'Reno
- The Phantom of Paris
- Platinum Blonde
- Possessed
- Private Lives
- The Public Defender
- The Public Enemy
- Quick Millions
- The Road to Singapore
- Safe in Hell
- The Secret Six
- The Sin of Madelon Claudet
- The Sin Ship
- Sit Tight
- Six Cylinder Love
- Smart Money
- Smart Woman
- The Smiling Lieutenant
- Son of India
- Sporting Blood
- The Squaw Man
- Strangers May Kiss
- Street Scene
- Strictly Dishonorable
- Surrender
- Susan Lenox (Her Fall and Rise)
- Svengali
- Tarnished Lady
- Ten Cents a Dance
- Tonight or Never
- Too Many Cooks
- Trader Horn
- Transatlantic
- Traveling Husbands
- Under Eighteen
- The Unholy Garden
- Up Pops the Devil
- Waterloo Bridge
- Way Back Home
- West of Broadway
- The Woman Between
- Women of All Nations

=== 1932 ===
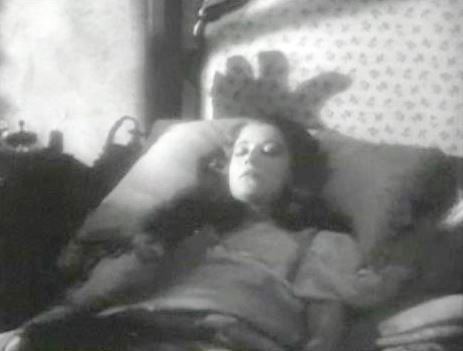
A screen shot from the trailer for 1932's Murders in the Rue Morgue. The ape Erik enters Camille's room, with the shadow of his hand appearing over her head. What follows has been dubbed "interspecies miscegenation" by film historian Thomas Doherty.

- 20,000 Years in Sing Sing
- Afraid to Talk
- After Tomorrow
- The Age of Consent
- Air Mail
- Alias Mary Smith
- Alias the Doctor
- American Madness
- Attorney for the Defense
- The Animal Kingdom
- Are You Listening?
- Arsène Lupin
- As You Desire Me
- Bachelor's Affairs
- Back Street
- The Beast of the City
- The Big Broadcast
- Big City Blues
- The Big Timer
- A Bill of Divorcement
- Bird of Paradise
- Blessed Event
- Blonde Venus
- Blondie of the Follies
- Broken Lullaby
- The Cabin in the Cotton
- Call Her Savage
- Central Park
- The Crash
- The Crowd Roars
- Cynara
- The Dark Horse
- The Devil is Driving
- Devil and the Deep
- Disorderly Conduct
- Divorce in the Family
- Doctor X
- Downstairs
- Emma
- Faithless
- The Famous Ferguson Case
- A Farewell to Arms
- Fast Life
- The First Year
- Flesh
- Forbidden
- Freaks
- Frisco Jenny
- Girl Crazy
- The Girl from Chicago
- Grand Hotel
- The Greeks Had a Word for Them
- The Half-Naked Truth
- The Hatchet Man
- The Heart of New York
- Hell's Highway
- Hell's House
- High Pressure
- Hold 'Em Jail
- Horse Feathers
- Hot Saturday
- I Am a Fugitive From a Chain Gang
- If I Had a Million
- Impatient Maiden
- Island of Lost Souls
- It's Tough to Be Famous
- Jewel Robbery
- The Kid from Spain
- Klondike
- Kongo
- Lady and Gent
- Lady with a Past
- The Last Mile (1932 film)
- Lawyer Man
- Letty Lynton
- Life Begins
- The Lost Squadron
- Love Affair
- Love Is a Racket
- Love Me Tonight
- Madame Butterfly
- Madame Racketeer
- Man Wanted
- The Man Who Played God
- The Mask of Fu Manchu
- The Match King
- Me and My Gal
- Men of Chance
- Merrily We Go to Hell
- Million Dollar Legs
- The Miracle Man
- Mr. Robinson Crusoe
- The Most Dangerous Game
- The Mouthpiece
- The Mummy
- Murders in the Rue Morgue
- New Morals for Old
- Night After Night
- Night World
- No Man of Her Own
- No More Orchids
- No One Man
- The Old Dark House
- Old Morals for New
- One Hour with You
- One Way Passage
- Panama Flo
- Payment Deferred
- The Penguin Pool Murder
- The Phantom President
- Polly of the Circus
- Prestige
- Probation
- The Purchase Price
- Rain
- Rasputin and the Empress
- Red Dust
- The Red-Haired Alibi
- Red-Headed Woman
- The Rich Are Always with Us
- Roar of the Dragon
- Rockabye
- Scarface
- Scarlet Dawn
- Shanghai Express
- Shopworn
- The Sign of the Cross
- The Silent Witness
- Silver Dollar
- Sinners in the Sun
- Sky Devils
- Skyscraper Souls
- Slightly Married
- Smilin' Through
- So Big!
- Speak Easily
- The Sport Parade
- State's Attorney
- Strange Interlude
- Strange Justice
- The Strange Love of Molly Louvain
- A Successful Calamity
- Symphony of Six Million
- Tarzan the Ape Man
- Taxi!
- Ten Minutes to Live
- Tess of the Storm Country
- That's My Boy
- Thirteen Women
- The Thirteenth Guest
- This Is the Night
- This Reckless Age
- Three on a Match
- Three Wise Girls
- Trouble in Paradise
- Two Against the World
- Two Kinds of Women
- Vanity Fair
- Virtue
- The Washington Masquerade
- Week-End Marriage
- Week Ends Only
- Westward Passage
- The Wet Parade
- What Price Hollywood
- White Zombie
- Wild Girl
- The Wiser Sex
- Winner Take All
- You Said a Mouthful
- Young America

=== 1933 ===
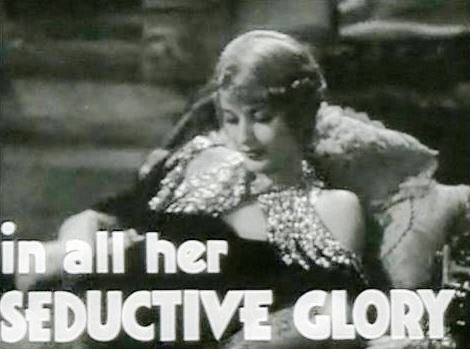
Barbara Stanwyck in the trailer for the 1933 film Baby Face. Movies in the Pre-Code era were frequently marketed with suggestive tag lines like this one for a picture in which Stanwyck sleeps her way up the corporate ladder of a New York bank.

- 42nd Street
- Ace of Aces
- After Tonight
- Air Hostess
- Ann Carver's Profession
- Ann Vickers
- Another Language
- Baby Face
- The Barbarian
- Beauty for Sale
- Bed of Roses
- Before Dawn
- The Bitter Tea of General Yen
- Blind Adventure
- Blondie Johnson
- Blood Money
- Bombshell
- The Bowery
- Brief Moment
- Broadway Through a Keyhole
- Broadway to Hollywood
- Bureau of Missing Persons
- Captured!
- Cavalcade
- Central Airport
- The Chief
- Child of Manhattan
- Christopher Strong
- College Coach
- College Humor
- Convention City
- Counsellor at Law
- Dancing Lady
- Day of Reckoning
- Design for Living
- The Devil's Brother
- Dinner at Eight
- Diplomaniacs
- Doctor Bull
- Double Harness
- Duck Soup
- The Eagle and the Hawk
- Elmer, the Great
- The Emperor Jones
- Employees' Entrance
- Ever in My Heart
- Ex-Lady
- Fast Workers
- Female
- Flying Devils
- Flying Down to Rio
- Footlight Parade
- From Headquarters
- From Hell to Heaven
- Gabriel Over the White House
- Gambling Ship
- The Ghoul
- Girl Missing
- Girl Without a Room
- Going Hollywood
- Gold Diggers of 1933
- Goodbye Again
- Goodbye Love
- Hallelujah, I'm a Bum
- Hard to Handle
- Havana Widows
- Headline Shooter
- Hell Below
- Hello, Sister!
- Heroes for Sale
- Hold Your Man
- Hoop-La
- Hot Pepper
- The House on 56th Street
- I Am Suzanne
- I Cover the Waterfront
- I'm No Angel
- The Invisible Man
- International House
- It's Great to Be Alive
- Jennie Gerhardt
- The Kennel Murder Case
- King Kong
- King of the Jungle
- The Kiss Before the Mirror
- Ladies They Talk About
- Lady Killer
- Laughter in Hell
- The Life of Jimmy Dolan
- Lilly Turner
- The Little Giant
- The Mad Game
- Made on Broadway
- Man's Castle
- Mary Stevens, M.D.
- The Masquerader
- The Mayor of Hell
- Meet the Baron
- Melody Cruise
- Men Must Fight
- Midnight Club
- Midnight Mary
- Morning Glory
- Murders in the Zoo
- Myrt and Marge
- Mystery of the Wax Museum
- My Weakness
- The Narrow Corner
- Night Flight
- No Other Woman
- One Man's Journey
- One Sunday Afternoon
- Only Yesterday
- Our Betters
- Parachute Jumper
- Parole Girl
- The Past of Mary Holmes
- Peg o' My Heart
- Penthouse
- Perfect Understanding
- Pick-Up
- Picture Snatcher
- The Power and the Glory
- Private Detective 62
- The Private Life of Henry VIII
- The Prizefighter and the Lady
- Professional Sweetheart
- Queen Christina
- Rafter Romance
- The Right to Romance
- Roman Scandals
- Sailor's Luck
- Saturday's Millions
- Scarlet River
- Secret of the Blue Room
- Secrets
- Sensation Hunters
- Shanghai Madness
- She Done Him Wrong
- She Had to Say Yes
- Should Ladies Behave
- A Shriek in the Night
- The Silver Cord
- The Sin of Nora Moran
- Sitting Pretty
- So This Is Africa
- Sons of the Desert
- The Secret of Madame Blanche
- The Song of Songs
- Stage Mother
- State Fair
- The Story of Temple Drake
- The Stranger's Return
- Sucker Money
- Supernatural
- This Day and Age
- Three-Cornered Moon
- To the Last Man
- Today We Live
- Too Much Harmony
- Topaze
- Torch Singer
- Tugboat Annie
- Turn Back the Clock
- The Vampire Bat
- Voltaire
- The Warrior's Husband
- West of Singapore
- When Ladies Meet
- Whistling in the Dark
- The White Sister
- White Woman
- Wild Boys of the Road
- The Woman Accused
- The Women in His Life
- The Working Man
- The World Changes
- The World Gone Mad
- You Made Me Love You
- Zoo in Budapest

=== 1934 ===
- A Very Honorable Guy
- The Affairs of Cellini
- All of Me
- Bachelor Bait
- The Barretts of Wimpole Street
- Bedside
- Belle of the Nineties
- The Big Shakedown
- The Black Cat
- Black Moon
- Bolero
- Born to Be Bad
- Bottoms Up
- The Captain Hates the Sea
- Carolina
- The Cat and the Fiddle
- Chained
- Change of Heart
- Chloe, Love Is Calling You
- The Circus Clown
- Cleopatra
- The Crime Doctor
- Dames
- Dark Hazard
- Death Takes a Holiday
- Dr. Monica
- Evelyn Prentice
- Fashions of 1934
- Finishing School
- Fog Over Frisco
- Forsaking All Others
- Four Frightened People
- Fugitive Lovers
- Gambling Lady
- The Gay Bride
- The Gay Divorcee
- George White's Scandals
- The Girl from Missouri
- Hat, Coat, and Glove
- Heat Lightning
- He Was Her Man
- Here Comes the Navy
- Hide-Out
- Hi Nellie!
- Hips, Hips, Hooray!
- Hollywood Party
- The House of Rothschild
- I Sell Anything
- Imitation of Life
- It Happened One Night
- I've Got Your Number
- Jimmy the Gent
- Journal of a Crime
- Keep 'Em Rolling
- Lady by Choice
- Laughing Boy
- Lazy River
- The Life of Vergie Winters
- Liliom
- Little Man, What Now?
- Little Miss Marker
- Long Lost Father
- The Lost Patrol
- The Man with Two Faces
- Mandalay
- Madame Du Barry
- Maniac
- Manhattan Love Song
- Manhattan Melodrama
- Massacre
- Men in White
- The Merry Widow
- Midnight
- Midnight Alibi
- A Modern Hero
- Moulin Rouge
- Murder at the Vanities
- Murder on the Blackboard
- The Mystery of Mr. X
- Nana
- No Greater Glory
- Now I'll Tell
- Of Human Bondage
- Once to Every Woman
- One More River
- Operator 13
- The Painted Veil
- Palooka
- The Personality Kid
- The Richest Girl in the World
- Riptide
- The Road to Ruin
- Sadie McKee
- The Scarlet Empress
- Search for Beauty
- She Loves Me Not
- She Made Her Bed
- The Show-Off
- Side Streets
- Sing and Like It
- Six of a Kind
- Smarty
- Social Register
- Spitfire
- Stamboul Quest
- Stand Up and Cheer!
- Stingaree
- Strictly Dynamite
- Success at Any Price
- Tarzan and His Mate
- The Thin Man
- Thirty Day Princess
- This Man Is Mine
- Tomorrow's Children
- The Trumpet Blows
- Twentieth Century
- Twenty Million Sweethearts
- Two Alone
- Upper World
- A Very Honorable Guy
- Viva Villa!
- We're Not Dressing
- We're Rich Again
- West of the Divide
- Wharf Angel
- Where Sinners Meet
- The Woman Condemned
- Wonder Bar
- You're Telling Me!

== See also ==
- Pre-Code Hollywood
- Pre-Code crime films
- Pre-Code sex films
- Hays Code

== Sources ==
- Doherty, Thomas Patrick. Pre-Code Hollywood: Sex, Immorality, and Insurrection in American Cinema 1930-1934. New York: Columbia University Press 1999. ISBN 0-231-11094-4
- Jacobs, Lea. The Wages of Sin: Censorship and the Fallen Woman Film, 1928-1942. Madison: University of Wisconsin Press 1997 ISBN 0-520-20790-4
- Jeff, Leonard L, & Simmons, Jerold L. The Dame in the Kimono: Hollywood, Censorship, and the Production Code. The University Press of Kentucky 2001 ISBN 0-8131-9011-8
- LaSalle, Mick. Complicated Women: Sex and Power in Pre-Code Hollywood. New York: St. Martin's Press 2000 ISBN 0-312-25207-2
- LaSalle, Mick. Dangerous Men: Pre-Code Hollywood and the Birth of the Modern Man. New York: Thomas Dunne Books 2002 ISBN 0-312-28311-3
- Leitch, Thomas. Crime Films. Cambridge University Press 2004 ISBN 0-511-04028-8
- Lewis, Jen. Hollywood V. Hard Core: How the Struggle Over Censorship Created the Modern Film Industry. NYU Press 2002 ISBN 0-8147-5142-3
- Prince, Stephen. Classical Film Violence: Designing and Regulating Brutality in Hollywood Cinema, 1930-1968. Rutgers University Press 2003 ISBN 0-8135-3281-7
- Smith, Sarah. Children, Cinema and Censorship: From Dracula to the Dead End Kids. Wiley-Blackwell 2005 ISBN 1-4051-2027-4
- Vieira, Mark A. Sin in Soft Focus: Pre-Code Hollywood. New York: Harry N. Abrams, Inc. 1999. ISBN 0-8109-8228-5
