= Pre-Code crime films =

Film genre popular before The Hays Code

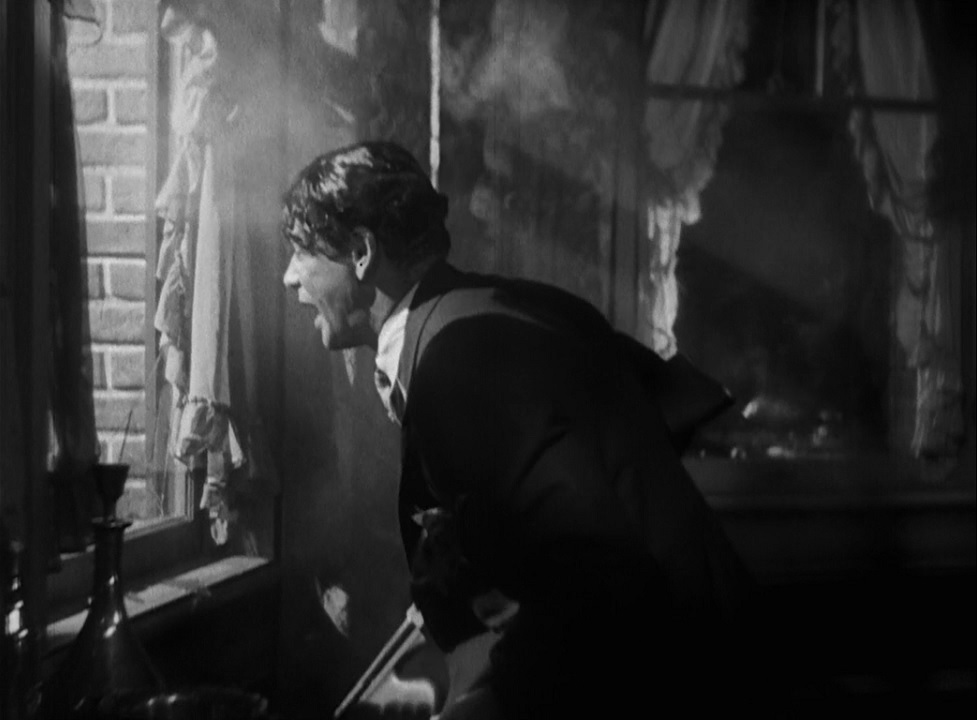
Paul Muni (as Tony Camonte) taunting and laughing at police officers he has just shot at in the trailer for Scarface (1932). The Hays office wanted this ending of the gangster film replaced with one where Muni's character is tried and executed.

The era of American film production from the early sound era to the enforcement of the Hays Code in 1934 is denoted as Pre-Code Hollywood. The era contained violence and crime in pictures which would not be seen again until decades later. Although the Hays office had specifically recommended removing profanity, the drug trade, and prostitution from pictures, it had never officially recommended against depictions of violence in any form in the 1920s. State censor boards, however, created their own guidelines, and New York in particular developed a list of violent material which had to be removed for a picture to be shown in the state. Two main types of crime films were released during the period: the gangster picture and the prison film.

A triumvirate of gangster pictures were released in the early 1930s—Little Caesar (1931), The Public Enemy (1931), and Scarface (1932)—which were built on the template created by the first gangster movie, 1927's Underworld. All featured the rise and eventual fall of an organized criminal. As described by crime film scholar Jack Shadoian the maxim became, "If the films insist that one can't win, under that given it's how you lose that counts." Scarface was the most controversial and violent; the film took nearly a year to reach theaters due to battles with censors. Obviously based on the life of Al Capone, Scarface and others like it outraged civic leaders who felt that movies were glorifying the lifestyles of criminals.

Stirred into action by the 1930 Ohio penitentiary fire, which resulted in 300 deaths when guards refused to let inmates out of their cells, Hollywood produced movies which depicted the harsh conditions in prisons at the time. The prototype of the prison genre was 1930's The Big House. The picture features future genre staples such as solitary confinement, informers, riots, an escape, and the codes of prison life. Never box office hits, prison pictures failed to attract the female audiences they needed to achieve financial success.

Chain gang films were produced in a similar response to the callous inhumanity of the chain gang system which was prevalent among states in the southern US. The 1932 film I Am a Fugitive from a Chain Gang is considered the seminal movie of the genre, and was based on the autobiography of Robert E. Burns who was himself a fugitive at the time of the picture's release.

== Early crime films ==
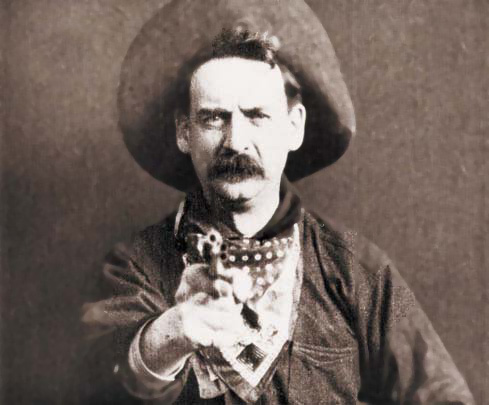
A famous shot, of Justus D. Barnes, from the 1903 film The Great Train Robbery, the first "Western" ever filmed. Scenes where criminals aimed guns at the camera were considered inappropriate by the New York state censor board in the 1920s and usually removed.

In the early 1900s America was still primarily a rural country, especially in terms of self-identity. D. W. Griffith's 1912 film The Musketeers of Pig Alley is one of the earliest American films to feature urban organized crime. Prohibition's arrival in 1920 created an environment where anyone who wanted to drink had to interact with criminals, especially in urban areas. Nonetheless, the urban crime genre was ignored until 1927 when the film Underworld, which is recognized as the first gangster movie, became a surprise hit. According to the Encyclopedia of Hollywood's entry on Underworld, "The film established the fundamental elements of the gangster movie: a hoodlum hero; ominous, night-shrouded city streets; floozies; and a blazing finale in which the cops cut down the protagonist." Other gangster films such as Thunderbolt, Lights of New York, The Racket, and The Doorway to Hell were released to capitalize on Underworld's popularity, with Thunderbolt later described as "a virtual remake" of the film. Motivated by financial gain in an increasingly competitive film market, and motivated by the fact that provocative pictures sold tickets, these movies pushed the boundaries of film violence. Other late 1920s crime films depicted organized crime on Broadway, and investigated the connection between mobsters and Broadway productions in films such as 1929's Tenderloin and Broadway.

The Hays Office had never recommended banning violence in any form in the 1920s—unlike profanity, the drug trade or prostitution—but advised that it be dealt with carefully. New York's censor board was the most active board of any state, reviewing around all but 50 of the country's 1,000–1,300 annual releases.

In 1927–8 the violent scenes they most removed were all instances where the gun was pointed at the camera, some instances where guns were pointed "at or into the body of another character", many shots where machine guns were featured, scenes where criminals shot at law enforcement officers, some scenes involving stabbing or knife brandishing (stabbings were considered more disturbing than shootings by audiences), most whippings, several involving choking, torture, or electrocution, and scenes which could be considered educational in their depiction of crime methods. Sadistic violence, and reaction shots showing the faces of individuals on the receiving end of violence were considered especially sensitive areas. The Code later recommended against scenes showing "robbery", "theft", "safe-cracking", "arson", "the use of firearms", "dynamiting of trains, machines, and buildings", and "brutal killings" on the basis that they would be rejected by local censors.

== Westerns ==
Justus D. Barnes starred as "Bronco Billy Anderson", leader of an outlaw gang from the silent film, The Great Train Robbery (1903), the first "Western" ever filmed. The Western was a subgenre of crime films. Scenes where criminals aimed guns at the camera were considered inappropriate by many state censor boards in the pre-Code and Code era, and were removed from public viewing.

== Birth of the Hollywood gangster ==
No motion picture genre of the Pre-Code era was more incendiary than the gangster film; neither preachment yarns nor vice films so outraged the moral guardians or unnerved the city fathers as the high caliber scenarios that made screen heroes out of stone killers.

— Pre-Code historian Thomas Doherty

In the early 1930s, several real life criminals became celebrities. Two in particular captured the American imagination: Al Capone and John Dillinger. Gangsters like Capone had transformed the perception of entire towns. Capone gave Chicago its "reputation as the locus classicus of American gangsterdom, a cityscape where bullet-proof roadsters with tommygun-toting hoodlums on running boards careened around State Street spraying fusillades of slugs into flower shop windows and mowing down the competition in blood-spattered garages." Capone appeared on the cover of Time magazine in 1930. He was even offered seven figure sums by two major Hollywood studios to appear in a film but declined. Dillinger became a national celebrity as a bank robber who eluded arrest and escaped confinement several times. He had become the most celebrated public outlaw since Jesse James. His father appeared in a popular series of newsreels giving police homespun advice on how to catch his son. Dillinger's popularity rose so fast that Variety joked "if Dillinger remains at large much longer and more such interviews are obtained, there may be some petitions circulated to make him our president." Hays wrote a cablegram to all the studios in March 1934 decreeing that Dillinger should not be portrayed in any motion picture.

In April 1931, the same month as the release of The Public Enemy, Hays recruited former police chief August Vollmer to conduct a study on the effect gangster pictures had on children. After he had finished his work, Vollmer stated that gangster films were innocuous and actually too favorable in their depiction of the police. Although Hays used the results to defend the film industry, the New York State censorship board was not impressed and from 1930 to 1932 removed 2,200 crime scenes from pictures.

One of the factors that made gangster pictures so subversive was that in the difficult economic times of the Depression there already existed the viewpoint that the only way to get financial success was through crime. Many were convinced they would lead to higher rates of juvenile delinquency. The Kansas City Times argued that while adults may not be affected by these films, they were "misleading, contaminating, and often demoralizing to children and youth." Exacerbating the problem, local theater owners advertised gangster pictures with a singular irresponsibility. Theaters displayed tommy guns and blackjacks and real-life murders were tied into promotions. The situation reached such a nexus that the studios had to ask exhibitors to tone down the gimmickry in their promotions.

The genre entered a new level following the 1931 release of Little Caesar. The film featured Edward G. Robinson in a career defining performance as gangster Rico Bandello. Caesar, along with The Public Enemy starring James Cagney, and Scarface featuring Paul Muni, were incredibly violent films that created a new type of anti-hero. Driven by the performance of one protagonist, they were considered "actors' vehicles". Nine gangster films were released in 1930, 26 in 1931, 28 in 1932, and 15 in 1933, when the genre's popularity began to subside after the end of Prohibition. The backlash against gangster pictures was swift. In 1931 Jack L. Warner announced that his studio would stop making them, and that he had never let his 15-year-old son see one.

=== Little Caesar ===
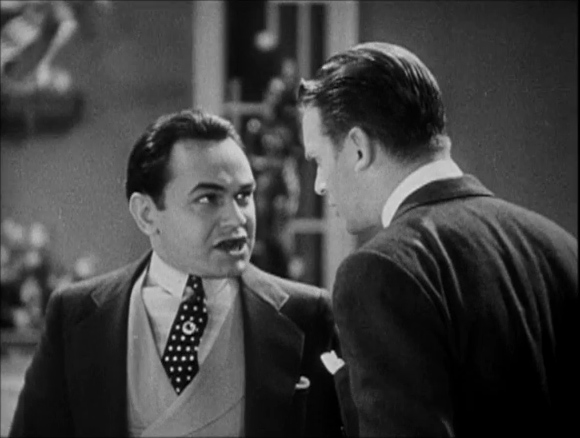
Rico (Edward G. Robinson) confronting Joe (Douglas Fairbanks Jr.) when Joe wants to leave the mob in Little Caesar (1931). The public's fascination with gangster films, in the early 1930s, was bolstered by, the constant newsreel appearances of, real-life criminals, like Al Capone and John Dillinger, upon whom characters like Robinson's were often based.

Warner Brothers 28‑year‑old head of production Darryl F. Zanuck decided to make a gangster picture in 1930 after one of his close friends was killed by a bootlegger. He purchased the rights to the novel Little Caesar by Chicago reporter W. R. Burnett for $15,000. Burnett had penned the gangster story after seeing the aftermath of the Capone ordered Saint Valentine's Day massacre. Generally considered the grandfather of gangster films, in Caesar, Robinson as Rico, and his close friend Joe Massara (played by Douglas Fairbanks, Jr.), move to Chicago. Joe wants to go straight and meets a woman. Rico, however, seeks a life of crime and joins the gang of Sam Vettori, rising to the rank of boss in the crime family. After becoming concerned his friend will betray him, he threatens him, at which point Joe's girlfriend goes to the police. Unable to bring himself to kill Joe and thus eliminate the witness against him, Rico goes into hiding. He is coaxed out by the police who publish that he is a coward to the press, and Rico is shot and killed by the police. As he is dying, he says "Mother of mercy, is this the end of Rico?"

The film is characterized by its tight, lean narrative, and runs at a brisk pace for its 79 minutes. The Rico character is not portrayed as admirable, and is shown to possess little intelligence. The picture has a simple, obvious storyline and is filmed in brighter images during Rico's triumphant rise, and at night and darkly shot during his fall. Among later film critics, Robinson's performances is frequently cited as the film's saving grace. The role typecast Robinson and led to caricatures from comedians, comic impressionists, and animated Looney Tunes characters. Originally Robinson was cast in a small role but convinced the film's producer to let him play the lead. Wingate told Hays that he was flooded with complaints from people who saw kids in theaters nationwide "applaud the gang leader as a hero." Jason Joy and Wingate disagreed over whether the film should have been released as it was; Joy argued that "the more ghastly, the more ruthless, the criminal acts, the stronger will be the audience reaction against men of this kind, and organized crime in general." Despite a personal letter from Joy pleading the film's case, Wingate, then head of the New York censor board, extensively edited the film, as did Pennsylvania's board.

Caesar's success inspired MGM's The Secret Six and Fox's Quick Millions, and Paramount's City Streets, but the next big Hollywood gangster came from another Warner Brothers picture.

=== The Public Enemy ===
James Cagney smashes a grapefruit into Mae Clarke's face in The Public Enemy (1931).

William Wellman's The Public Enemy (1931) was released by Warner Brothers the following year and features another career defining performance, this time by James Cagney. It was adapted from the unpublished novelette Beer and Blood written by John Bright, and adapted for the screen by Kubec Glasmon and Bright. Enemy takes place from 1909 until 1920. The film is similar to the template set in Caesar in that it follows Tom Powers (Cagney) from his rise to his eventual fall in the world of crime. Cagney's character contrasts his puritanical brother who wants him to go straight and their mother, who is at the center of the conflict between her two sons. Tom Powers is egotistical, amoral, heartless, and extremely violent.

The most famous scene in the picture is referred to as the "grapefruit scene"; when Cagney is eating breakfast, his girlfriend angers him, so he cruelly shoves half of a grapefruit in her face. The scene became so famous that for the rest of his life when Cagney dined at a restaurant, other patrons would send his table a grapefruit. Cagney was even more violent towards women in his 1933 gangster film Picture Snatcher, where he knocks out an amorous woman he is not interested in and violently throws her into the back seat of his car. Enemy was based in part on the Irish gangster Dean O'Banion, and a scene in which Cagney kills a horse that caused the death of a friend was inspired by a similar real life event where O'Banion underling Louis "Two Guns" Alterie and others shot a horse. The film's trailer featured no scenes from the movie; it merely contained a warning of the picture's intensity and showcased a gun being fired at the camera. Zanuck also produced Enemy, and was heavily involved in the film's production. He aimed for a movie where the characters were not just immoral, but free of morals, and devoid of conscience. When he showed the film to MGM's Irving Thalberg, Thalberg remarked "that's not a motion picture. It's beyond a motion picture." While Wingate conceded that the film "was a story that needed to be told", other states were less convinced. Maryland and Ohio cut the grapefruit scene. All states cut a scene where Powers sleeps with a gang den mother while drunk, then slaps her when he wakes up and realizes she took advantage of him.

Public Enemy was a massive box office success, and helped the financial fortunes of Warner Brothers which was still operating in the red at the time. This embarrassed Hays who had remarked at the film's opening that "the greatest of all censors—the American public—is beginning to vote thumbs down on the "hard-boiled" realism in literature and on the stage which marked the post-war period."

=== Scarface ===
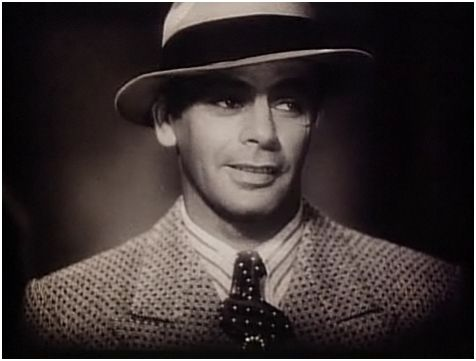
Paul Muni in the trailer for Scarface (1932), based on the life of Chicago gangster Al Capone. Due to battles with censors, the film was delayed for almost a year.

The most violent and controversial pre-Code gangster film was undoubtedly Scarface (1932). Directed by Howard Hawks and starring Paul Muni as Tony Camonte, the film is based on the life of Al Capone. When the film begins, Camonte works for Johnny Lovo but is unhappy being a subordinate, and is attracted to Lovo's girlfriend Poppy. He has a deep love for his promiscuous sister, who he expects to remain chaste, which has often been deemed incestuous. Lovo warns Camonte to leave the North Side alone as it is controlled by a rival mob. Camonte ignores this warning and begins a series of executions and extortions that result in a war with the North side gang. Camonte then takes the gang over from Lovo, at which point Lovo tries to kill him but fails. Camonte murders Lovo and Poppy becomes his girl. When Camonte finds his missing sister in a hotel room with his closest friend, the coin flipping gangster Guino Rinaldo (played by George Raft), he goes into a rage and kills Rinaldo. After he finds out that they had become married and wanted to surprise Camonte he becomes despondent. The film ends with first Camonte sister then Camonte being gunned down by police at his home.

The production of Scarface was troubled from the start. The Hays office warned Howard Hughes, the film's producer, not to make the film. He ignored their pleas telling Hawks: "Screw the Hays Office. Start the picture and make it as realistic, as exciting, as grisly as possible." When the film was completed in late 1931, the Hays office demanded numerous changes, including a conclusion where Camonte was captured, tried, convicted, and hung, and demanded the film carry the subtitle Shame of a Nation. Hughes sent the picture to numerous state censorship boards, saying that he hoped to show the film was made to combat the "gangster menace". After failing to get the film past the New York State censor board (then headed by Wingate) even after the changes, Hughes decided to release the movie in a version close to its original form. When other local censors refused to release the edited version, the Hays Office sent Jason Joy around to ensure them that the cycle of gangster films of this nature was coming to an end.

Scarface provoked outrage mainly due to its unprecedented violence, but also because of its shifts of tone from serious to comedic. Dave Kehr, writing in the Chicago Reader, said that the film blends "comedy and horror in a manner that suggests Chico Marx let loose with a live machine gun." In one scene, Camonte is inside a cafe while a torrent of machine gun fire from the car of a rival gang is headed his way. His bumbling assistant, following orders from Camonte, keeps trying to answer the phone instead of ducking even after the gangsters make several passes by the cafe. After the barrage is over, Camonte picks up a tommy gun one of the mobsters dropped, and exhibits child like wonder and unrestrained excitement over the new toy. Civic leaders became furious that gangsters like Capone (who was also the blatant inspiration for Little Caesar) were being applauded in movie houses all across America. Some of the biographical details that were used for Muni's character in Scarface were so obviously taken from Capone, and the detail so close, that it was impossible not to draw the parallels. Capone sent several members of his gang to threaten screenwriter Ben Hecht, but Hecht was able to convince them the picture was based on other gangsters. When Scarface was released however, Capone adored the film, and purchased a personal copy. The film remained out of circulation, until Hughes's death in 1976. After Hughes' death in 1976, Universal then re-released the picture in 1979, but some scenes from the film's original cut are lost. Scarface is the only pre-Code gangster film to received a PG rating by the Motion Picture Association (MPA).

== Prison films ==
In contrast to the crumbling social system outside their walls, the prison film portrayed a universe where the state was all powerful and orderly. Sparked by the Ohio penitentiary fire on April 21, 1930 in which guards refused to release prisoners from their cells causing 300 deaths, the films depicted the inhumane conditions in prisons in the early 1930s. The genre was composed of two archetypes: the prison film and the chain gang film. In the prison film, large hordes of men move about in identical uniforms, resigned to their fate, they live by a well defined code. In the chain gang film, Southern prisoners were subjected to a draconian system in the blazing outdoors where they were treated terribly by their ruthless captors. The prototype of the prison genre was 1930's The Big House. 1932's I am a Fugitive from a Chain Gang is considered the seminal film of the chain gang genre. Although the chain gang film Hell's Highway had beaten Fugitive to the screen two months earlier, it exerted nowhere the influence.

In The Big House (1930), Robert Montgomery plays a squirmy inmate who is sentences to six years after committing vehicular manslaughter while under the influence. His cellmates are a murderer played by Wallace Beery and a forger played by Chester Morris. The picture features future staples of the prison genre such as solitary confinement, informers, riots, visitations, an escape, and the codes of prison life. The protagonist, Montgomery, ends up being a loathsome character, a coward who will sell anyone in the prison out to get an early release. The film was banned in Ohio, the site of the deadly prison riots that inspired it. Numbered Men, The Criminal Code, Shadow of the Law, Convict's Code, and others, from no less than seven studios, followed. However, prison films only appealed to men, and had weak box office performances as a result. Studios also produced children's prison films which addressed the juvenile delinquency problems of America in the Depression. The Mayor of Hell for instance, featured kids killing a murderously abusive reform school overseer without retribution.

=== Chain gang films ===
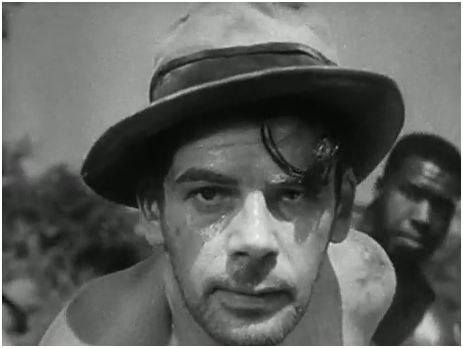
Paul Muni prepares to have his ankle shackles bent, via sledge hammer, by the prisoner, in the background in I Am a Fugitive from a Chain Gang (1932). Based on the autobiographical memoirs of Robert E. Burns, who was himself a fugitive at the time of the picture's release, the film was a powerful agent for social change.

Chain gang movies, like Hell's Highway (1932), are usually used to promote awareness about the brutal conditions that prisoners were subjected to in most Southern prisons. I Am a Fugitive from a Chain Gang (1932), which is based on the true story of Robert. E. Burns, is by far the most famous example of those films. In the first half of 1931, True Detective Mysteries magazine had published Burns' work over six issues, and it was released as a book in January 1932. Decorated veteran James Allen (Paul Muni) returns from World War I a changed man, and seeks an alternative to the tedious job that he left behind. He travels the country looking for construction work. His ultimate goal is to become involved in construction planning. Allen follows a hobo he met at a homeless shelter into a cafe, taking him up on his offer of a free meal. When the hobo attempts to rob the eatery, Allen is charged as an accessory, convicted of stealing a few dollars, and sentenced to ten years in a chain gang. The men are chained together and transported to a quarry to break rocks every day. Even when unchained from each other, shackles remain around their ankles at all times. Allen convinces a large black prisoner who has particularly good aim to hit the shackles on his ankles with a sledgehammer to bend them. He removes his feet from the bent shackles, and in a famous sequence, escapes through the woods while being chased by bloodhounds. On the outside he develops a new identity and becomes a respected developer in Chicago. He is blackmailed into marriage by a woman he does not love who finds out his secret. When he threatens to leave her for a young woman he has fallen in love with, she turns him in. His case becomes a cause célèbre, and he agrees to turn himself in under the agreement that he will serve 90 days and then be released. He is tricked however, and not freed at the agreed upon time. This forces him to escape again, and he seeks out the young woman, telling her that they cannot be together because he will always be hunted. The films end with her asking him how he survives, and his ominous reply from the darkness; "I Steal".

Although based on reality, Chain Gang changes the facts slightly to appeal to Depression era audiences by making Allen's return home one to a country that is struggling economically, even though Burns returned to the roaring twenties. The film's bleak, anti-establishment ending shocked audiences. Laughter in Hell, a 1933 film directed by Edward L. Cahn and starring Pat O'Brien, was inspired in part by I Am a Fugitive from a Chain Gang. O'Brien plays a railroad engineer who kills his wife and her lover in a jealous rage, and is sent to prison. The dead man's brother ends up being the warden of the prison and torments O'Brien's character. O'Brien and several others revolt, killing the warden and escaping. The film, which was previously thought lost, drew controversy for its lynching scene in which several black men were hanged. Reports vary if the blacks were hanged alongside other white men, or by themselves. The New Age (an African American weekly newspaper) film critic praised the filmmakers for being courageous enough to depict the atrocities that were occurring in some southern states.

== See also ==
- List of pre-Code films
- Motion Picture Production Code
- Pre-Code Hollywood
- Pre-Code sex films

== Sources ==
- Black, Gregory D. Hollywood Censored: Morality Codes, Catholics, and the Movies. Cambridge University Press 1996 ISBN 0-521-56592-8
- Doherty, Thomas Patrick. Pre-Code Hollywood: Sex, Immorality, and Insurrection in American Cinema 1930-1934. New York: Columbia University Press 1999. ISBN 0-231-11094-4
- Grieveson, Lee, Sonnet, Esther, and Stanfield, Peter. Mob culture: hidden histories of the American gangster film. Rutgers University Press 2005 ISBN 0-8135-3557-3
- Hughes, Howard. Crime Wave: The Filmgoers' Guide to the Great Crime Movies. I. B. Tauris 2006 ISBN 1-84511-219-9
- Izod, John. Hollywood and the Box Office, 1895-1986. Columbia University Press 1988 ISBN 0-231-06724-0
- Leitch, Thomas. Crime Films. Cambridge University Press 2004 ISBN 0-511-04028-8
- Niemi, Robert. History in the Media: Film and Television. ABL-CIO 2006 ISBN 1-57607-952-X
- Parkinson, David. History of Film. Thames & Hudson 1996 ISBN 0-500-20277-X
- Prince, Stephen. Classical Film Violence: Designing and Regulating Brutality in Hollywood Cinema, 1930-1968. Rutgers University Press 2003 ISBN 0-8135-3281-7
- Schatz, Thomas. Hollywood: Social dimensions: technology, regulation and the audience. Taylor & Francis 2004
- Shadoian, Jack. Dreams & dead ends: the American gangster film. Oxford University Press 2003 ISBN 0-19-514291-8
- Siegel, Scott, & Siegel, Barbara. The Encyclopedia of Hollywood. 2nd edition Checkmark Books 2004. ISBN 0-8160-4622-0
- Springhall, John. Youth, Popular Culture and Moral Panics: Penny Gaffs to Gangsta Rap, 1830-1996. Palgrave Macmillan 1999 ISBN 0-312-21395-6
- Smith, Sarah. Children, Cinema and Censorship: From Dracula to the Dead End Kids. Wiley-Blackwell 2005 ISBN 1-4051-2027-4
- Turan, Kenneth. Never Coming to a Theater Near You: A Celebration of a Certain Kind of Movie. Public Affairs 2004 ISBN 1-58648-231-9
- Vieira, Mark A. Sin in Soft Focus: Pre-Code Hollywood. New York: Harry N. Abrams, Inc. 1999. ISBN 0-8109-8228-5
