= Pre-Code sex films =

Film genre popular before The Hays Code

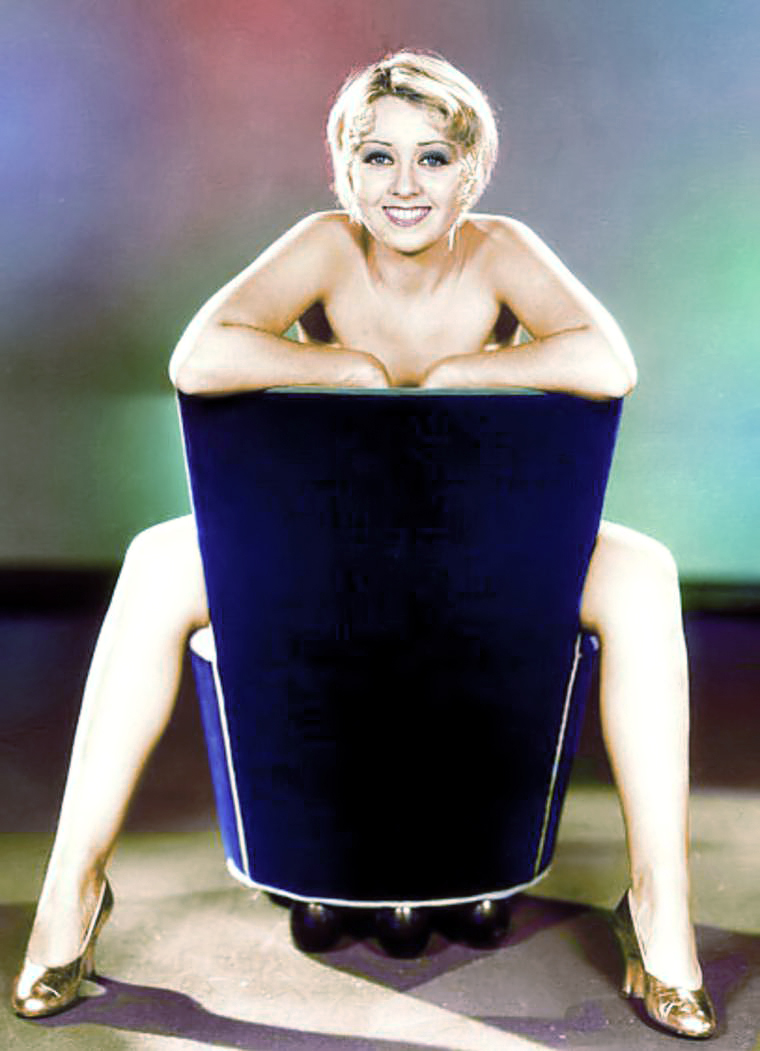
This 1932 promotional photo of Joan Blondell was later banned under the then unenforceable Motion Picture Production Code.

Pre-Code sex films refers to movies made in the Pre-Code Hollywood era, roughly encompassed between either the introduction of sound in the late 1920s or February 1930 (with the publication of the Production Code) and December 1934 (with the full enforcement of the Code, which had begun in July of that year). This period was marked by an increase of sensationalistic content in pictures made by the major studios in a climate marked by the Great Depression and major debates on morality, often containing sexual references and images that were contrary to the yet to be enforced Hays Code. Pre-Code sex films explored women's issues and challenged the concept of marriage, and aggressive sexuality was the norm. The sexual subject matter of the uncensored period was found within many movie genres, most especially in dramas, crime films, exotic-adventure films, comedies and musicals.

== Sexuality in early film ==
Sex has been related to motion pictures from almost their beginning: one of the earliest kinetoscopes featuring a woman was a belly dance, while another one was The Kiss, which recreated the first live kiss on the Broadway stage. In the 1900s, the earliest-recorded pornographic movies were produced, and by 1920, "stag reels" led to the creation of small but intensely active industries.

The Kiss (1896) was the first kiss on film from the Edison Studios of Thomas A. Edison, filmed in the first movie studio in the United States.

During the American intervention in World War I (1917–18), several "sex hygiene" pictures were commissioned, aimed at soldiers who were warned about the dangerous consequences of engaging on sexual activity while overseas, while films like 1917's Cleopatra became controversial for its erotic imagery. After the war, young people began to rebel against the Victorian mores of their parents, especially regarding moral issues, and the recently established Hollywood studios soon released a slew of films that featured such moral dilemmas front and center. However, these movies generated a furious reaction from civic leaders, especially outside major cities, and the accompanying scandals that engulfed the nascent industry led to the creation of the Motion Picture Producers and Distributors of America trade association in 1922. Headed by Will Hays, the MPPDA's charter had its members refrain from producing movies that treaded on morality and other subjects considered offensive.

As a result, several independent producers, including some of those who made "sex hygiene" films contributed to the emergence of a new type of motion picture, featuring highly melodramatic stories that included nudity, drug use, violence and even thinly veiled sexual intercourse under the guise of presenting "documents" on moral and social issues that major studios were tacitly forbidden to touch directly. Exploitation films, termed as such for their lurid themes outrageous approach to promotion, were the racy descendants of the "morality plays" of the 19th century, featuring titles that ranged from the suggestive to the provocative, such as By Natural Law, Married Love, The Road to Ruin (1928, remade in 1934) Her Unborn Child (1930), Unguarded Girls (1929) and Sex Madness (1929, remade in 1938). These films, often made with minimal budgeting, spared no expense on gimmicks, including the use of lecturers and live models as well as carrying their "pink tickets" (special certificates from state censorship boards granted to films deemed unsuitable for a general audience) as a major selling point, not only advertising them as being for adults only, but also often arranged for "men only" or "women only" showings. In spite of these being routinely subjected to rejections by local censor boards and police raids (the latter countered by having "sizzle reels" alternating with "cold reels" as well as often presenting films under different names), these resulted a profitable business for their presenters, some of which took a "roadshow" approach for their product.

== Hollywood goes hot ==
By the spring of 1930, exploitation films, until then mostly ignored by the industry (to the point that trade publications plainly omitted the box-office takings of "sex" pictures), gained unexpected prominence with Unguarded Girls reaching a "de luxe" Broadway house (the Earl Carroll Theatre prior to renovations). Ingagi, a bogus documentary featuring the presence of naked women and "the sex lives of gorillas", became a rousing success thanks to its massive advertising campaign. It generally debuted in or near the top of the box-office tallies in spite of often being released in low-class theaters, as the MPPDA forbade movie houses operated by member studios from showing the film owing to its allegations of fakery and indecency.

On the other hand, major studios were losing money as a result of the economic crisis (with movie-going figures plummeting from 100 million per week in 1929 to 40 million in 1933) aside from having just paid expensive conversions to sound in 1928–29. A brief vogue of crime films flooded movie screens beginning in the fall of 1930, but waned by the 1931–32 season as public outcry over the portrayal of criminals increased. Desperate for quick money, studios began taking note of the increasing success of "sex" pictures and increasingly turned to films featuring prurient elements, often putting in extra suggestive material which they knew would never reach theaters as bargaining chips to the Hays Office. MGM screenwriter Donald Ogden Stewart said that "[Joy and Wingate (head censors from 1930 to 1934)] wouldn't want to take out too much, so you would give them five things to take out to satisfy the Hays Office—and you would get away with murder with what they left in." In 1932 Warner Bros. Pictures' policy was that "two out of five stories should be hot".

Studios marketed their films, sometimes dishonestly, by coming up with suggestive taglines and lurid titles such as Laughing Sinners, The Devil Is Driving, Free Love, Hot Saturday, Merrily We Go to Hell and, most ludicrously, Cock of the Air, although some proposed titles such as Virgins in Cellophane and Sandy Hooker were rejected. Some companies even went so far as to come up with in-house contests for thinking up provocative titles for screenplays. Commonly labeled "sex films" by the censors, these pictures offended taste in more categories than just sexuality. According to a Variety analysis of 440 pictures produced in the 1932–33 season, 352 had "some sex slant", with 145 possessing "questionable sequences", and 44 being "critically sexual"." The trade paper summarized that "over 80% of the world's chief picture output was ... flavored with bedroom essence." Attempts to create films for adults only (dubbed "pinking") only served to bring larger audiences of all ages to theaters. Posters and publicity photos often were tantalizing. Women appeared in poses and garb not even glimpsed in the films themselves. In some cases, actresses with small parts in films, or in the case of Dolores Murray in her publicity still for The Common Law (1931), no part at all, appeared barely clothed.

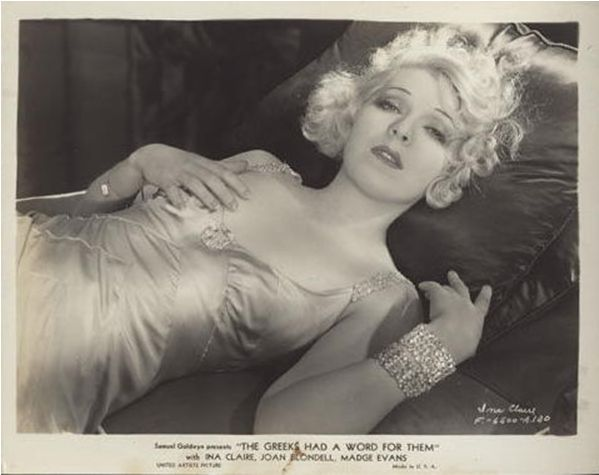
Publicity photos like this (Ina Claire in a publicity still for the 1932 film The Greeks Had a Word for Them), with a woman lying down, posing rapturously, provoked outrage among civic leaders.

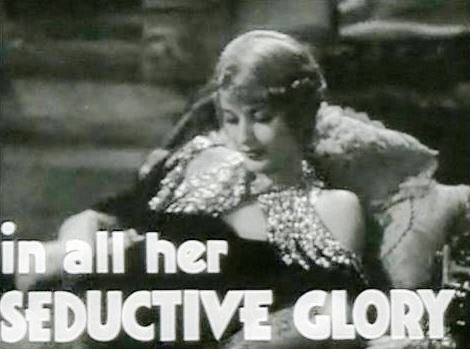
Barbara Stanwyck in Baby Face (1933). Movies in the pre-code era were frequently portrayed as lurid during their marketing campaigns. In Baby Face Stanwyck sleeps her way up the corporate ladder of a New York bank.

Hays became outraged at the steamy pictures circulating in newspapers around the country. The original Hays Code contained an often ignored note about advertising imagery, but he wrote an entirely new set of advertising rules in the style of the Ten Commandments that contained a set of twelve prohibitions. The first seven addressed imagery and prohibited women in undergarments, women raising their skirts, suggestive poses, kissing, necking, and other suggestive material. The last five concerned advertising copy and prohibited misrepresentation of the film's contents, "salacious copy", and the word "courtesan". Soon, studios found their way around the restrictions and published more racy imagery. Ultimately this backfired in 1934 when a billboard in Philadelphia was placed outside Cardinal Thomas Dougherty's home. Severely offended, Dougherty helped launch the motion picture boycott that later facilitated the enforcement of the code. A commonly repeated theme by those supporting censorship, and one mentioned in the code itself, was the notion that film was a medium that greatly appealed to the masses and thus needed to be regulated.

Despite the obvious attempts to appeal to red-blooded American males, most of the patrons of sex pictures were female. Variety squarely blamed women for the increase in vice pictures:

Women are responsible for the ever-increasing public taste in sensationalism and sexy stuff. Women who make up the bulk of the picture audiences are also the majority reader of the tabloids, scandal sheets, flashy magazines, and erotic books ... the mind of the average man seems wholesome in comparison ... Women love dirt, nothing shocks 'em.

Pre-code female audiences liked to delight in the carnal lifestyles of mistresses and adulteresses as well as being gratified by their usually inevitable downfall in the closing scenes of the picture. And while gangster pictures were claimed to corrupt the morals of young boys, vice films were blamed for threatening the purity of adolescent women.

In pre-code Hollywood, the sex film became synonymous with women's pictures—Zanuck once told Wingate that he was ordered by Warner Brothers New York corporate office to reserve 20% of the studio's output for "women's pictures, which inevitably means sex pictures."

== Content ==
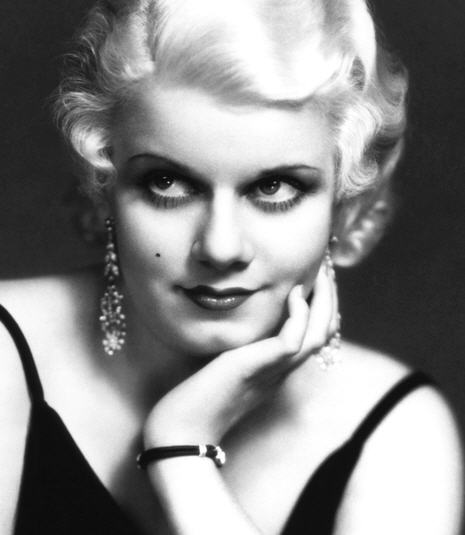
Jean Harlow was described in the Encyclopedia of Hollywood as "the reigning sex symbol of the 1930s." Harlow was propelled to stardom in pre-code films such as Platinum Blonde, Red Dust and Red-Headed Woman.

Vice films typically tacked on endings where the most sin-filled characters were either punished or redeemed. Films explored code-defying subjects in an unapologetic manner with the premise that an end-reel moment could redeem all that had gone before. The concept of marriage was often tested. In The Prodigal (1931) a woman has an affair with a seedy character, and later falls in love with her brother-in-law. When her mother-in-law steps in at the end of the film it is to encourage her husband to grant her a divorce so she can marry the brother she is obviously in love with, proclaiming the message of the film: "This is the twentieth century. Go out into the world and get what happiness you can." In Madam Satan (1930) adultery is explicitly condoned and is a sign for a wife that she needs to act in a more enticing way to maintain her husband's interest. And in Secrets (1933) a husband admits to serial adultery, only this time he repents and the marriage is saved. The films took aim at what was already a damaged institution. During the Great Depression, relations between spouses often deteriorated due to financial strain, marriages lessened, and husbands abandoned their families in increased numbers. Marriage rates continually declined in the early 1930s, finally rising in 1934 and although divorce rates lowered, this is likely because couples simply separated to save the cost of a divorce. Consequently, female characters in pictures such as Ruth Chatterton's in Female, live promiscuous bachelorette lifestyles, and control their own financial destiny (Chatterton supervises an auto factory) without regret.

One of the most prominent examples of punishment for immoral transgressions in a vice film was The Story of Temple Drake (1933), where a promiscuous woman is raped and forced into prostitution. According to Thomas Doherty, the film implies that the deeds done to her are in recompense for her immorality. And in the RKO film Christopher Strong, Katharine Hepburn plays an aviator who becomes pregnant from an affair with a married man. She commits suicide by flying her plane directly upwards until she breaks the world altitude record, at which point she takes off her oxygen mask and plummets to Earth. Strong female characters often ended films as "reformed" feminists, after experiencing situations in which their progressive outlook proved faulty.

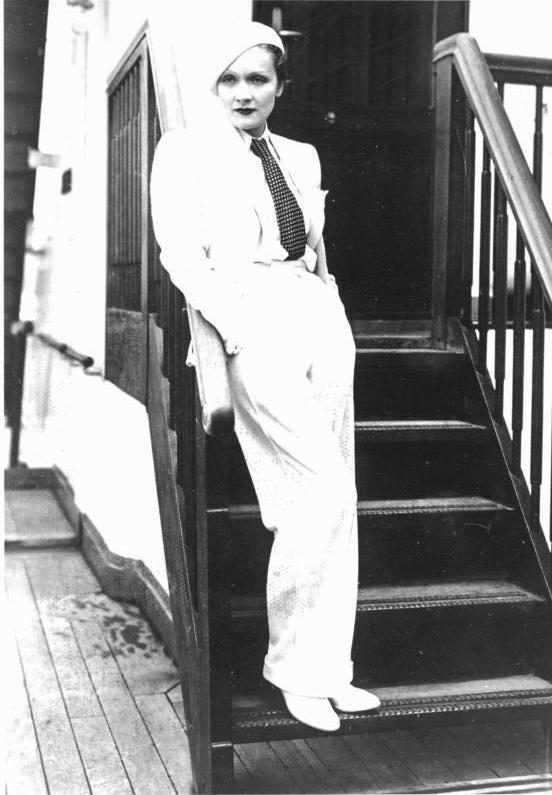
Marlene Dietrich, who was openly bisexual, wore men's clothes in public. In a society still markedly against homosexuality and crossdressing, this caused quite an uproar. In 1933 her studio, Paramount, signed a largely ineffectual document stating that they would not allow women in men's clothes to appear in their films to both quell the backlash and generate some publicity.

Female protagonists in aggressively sexual vice films were usually of two general kinds: the bad girl or the fallen woman. In so-called "bad girl" pictures, female characters profit from promiscuity and immoral behavior. Jean Harlow, an actress who was by all reports a lighthearted, kind person off the screen, frequently played bad girl characters and dubbed them "sex vultures". Two of the most prominent examples of bad girl films were Red-Headed Woman (1932) and Baby Face (1933). In Red-Headed Woman, Jean Harlow plays a secretary determined to sleep her way into a more luxurious lifestyle. She seduces her boss and intentionally breaks up his marriage. During her seductions, he tries to resist and slaps her, at which point she looks at him deliriously and replies "Do it again, I like it! Do it again!" They eventually marry but Harlow seduces a wealthy aged industrialist who is in business with her husband so that she can move to New York. Although this plan succeeds, she is cast aside when she is discovered having an affair with her chauffeur, in essence cheating on her paramour. Harlow shoots the original boss, nearly killing him. When she is last seen in the film, she is in France in the back seat of a limousine with an elderly wealthy gentleman being driven along by the same chauffeur. The film was a boon to Harlow's career and has been described as a "trash masterpiece." Similarly, in Baby Face Barbara Stanwyck is an abused runaway determined to use sex to advance herself financially and sleeps her way to the top of Gotham Trust. Her progress is illustrated in a recurring visual metaphor of the movie camera panning ever upward along the front of Gotham Trust's skyscraper. Men are driven mad with lust over her and they commit murder, attempt suicide, and are ruined financially for associating with her before she mends her ways in the final reel. In another departure from post-code films, Stanwyck's sole companion for the duration of the picture is a black woman named Chico she took with her when she ran away from home.

Cinema classified as "fallen woman" films was often inspired by real-life hardships women endured in the early Depression era workplace. The men in power in these pictures frequently sexually harassed the women working for them. Remaining employed often became a question of a woman's virtue. In She Had to Say Yes, a struggling department store offers dates with its female stenographers as an incentive to customers. And Employees' Entrance was marketed with the tag line "See what out of work girls are up against these days." Joy complained in 1932 of another genre, the "kept woman" film, which presented adultery as an alternative to the tedium of an unhappy marriage.

Homosexuals were portrayed in several Pre-Code films such as Call Her Savage, Our Betters, Footlight Parade, Only Yesterday, Sailor's Luck, Sunny Skies, and Cavalcade. Although the topic was dealt much more openly than in the decades that followed, the characterizations of gay and lesbian characters were usually derogatory. Gay male characters were portrayed as possessing a high tone voice and a flighty personality. They existed merely as buffoonish supporting characters. In films like Ladies They Talk About, lesbians were portrayed as rough, burly characters, but in DeMille's The Sign of the Cross, a female Christian slave is brought in front of a Roman prefect and seduced in dance by a statuesque lesbian dancer. Fox nearly became the first American studio to use the word "gay" in reference to homosexuality, but the SRC made the studio muffle the word in the soundtrack of all reels that reached theaters. Bisexual actress Marlene Dietrich cultivated a cross-gender fan base and started a trend when she began wearing men's suits, a style well ahead of its time in the 1930s. She caused a commotion when she appeared at the premiere of the 1930 pre-code film Morocco in a tuxedo complete with top hat and cane. The backlash against homosexual characters appearing in films was rapid. In 1933 Hays declared that all gay male characters would be removed from pictures, and Paramount took advantage of the negative publicity Dietrich generated by signing a largely meaningless agreement stating that they would not portray women in male attire.

== See also ==
- Circumventing censorship with alternate footage in pre-Code films
- Pre-Code Hollywood
- List of pre-Code films

== Sources ==
- Bernstein, Matthew. Controlling Hollywood: Censorship and Regulation in the Studio Era. Rutgers University Press 1999 ISBN 0-8135-2707-4
- Black, Gregory D. Hollywood Censored: Morality Codes, Catholics, and the Movies. Cambridge University Press 1996 ISBN 0-521-56592-8
- Doherty, Thomas Patrick. Pre-Code Hollywood: Sex, Immorality, and Insurrection in American Cinema 1930-1934. New York: Columbia University Press 1999. ISBN 0-231-11094-4
- Hughes, Howard. Crime Wave: The Filmgoers' Guide to the Great Crime Movies. I. B. Tauris 2006 ISBN 1-84511-219-9
- Jacobs, Lea. The Wages of Sin: Censorship and the Fallen Woman Film, 1928-1942. Madison: University of Wisconsin Press 1997 ISBN 0-520-20790-4
- Jeff, Leonard L, & Simmons, Jerold L. The Dame in the Kimono: Hollywood, Censorship, and the Production Code. The University Press of Kentucky 2001 ISBN 0-8131-9011-8
- LaSalle, Mick. Complicated Women: Sex and Power in Pre-Code Hollywood. New York: St. Martin's Press 2000 ISBN 0-312-25207-2
- Lewis, Jen. Hollywood V. Hard Core: How the Struggle Over Censorship Created the Modern Film Industry. NYU Press 2002 ISBN 0-8147-5142-3
- Massey, Anne. Hollywood Beyond the Screen: Design and Material Culture. Berg Publishers 2000 ISBN 1-85973-316-6
- McElvaine, Robert S. (editor in chief) Encyclopedia of The Great Depression Volume 1 (A-K). Macmillan Reference USA 2004 ISBN 0-02-865687-3
- McElvaine, Robert S. (editor in chief) Encyclopedia of The Great Depression Volume 2 (L-Z). Macmillan Reference USA 2004 ISBN 0-02-865688-1
- Siegel, Scott, & Siegel, Barbara. The Encyclopedia of Hollywood. 2nd edition Checkmark Books 2004. ISBN 0-8160-4622-0
- Smith, Sarah. Children, Cinema and Censorship: From Dracula to the Dead End Kids. Wiley-Blackwell 2005 ISBN 1-4051-2027-4
- Turan, Kenneth. Never Coming to a Theater Near You: A Celebration of a Certain Kind of Movie. Public Affairs 2004 ISBN 1-58648-231-9
- Vasey, Ruth. The World According to Hollywood, 1918-1939. University of Wisconsin Press 1997 ISBN 0-299-15194-8
- Vieira, Mark A. Sin in Soft Focus: Pre-Code Hollywood. New York: Harry N. Abrams, Inc. 1999. ISBN 0-8109-8228-5
