= Call Her Savage =

1932 pre-Code drama film

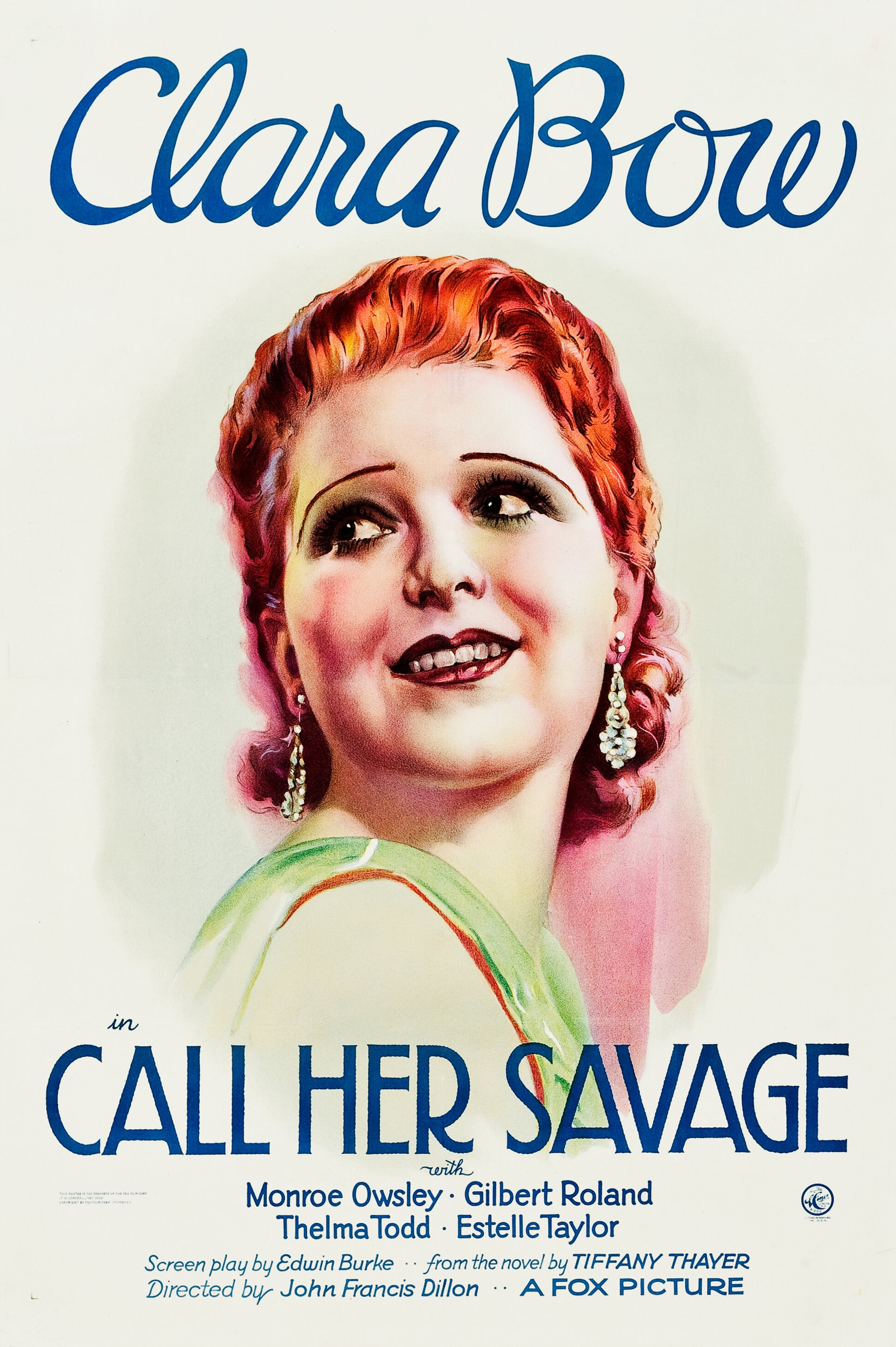
- Theatrical release one-sheet poster
- Directed by: John Francis Dillon
- Screenplay by: Edwin J. Burke
- Based on: Call Her Savage by Tiffany Thayer
- Produced by: Sam E. Rork
- Starring: Clara Bow; Gilbert Roland
- Cinematography: Lee Garmes
- Edited by: Harold D. Schuster
- Music by: Peter Brunelli; Arthur Lange
- Production company: Fox Film Corporation
- Distributed by: Fox Film Corporation
- Release date: November 24, 1932; (New York}
- Running time: 88 minutes
- Country: United States
- Language: English

Call Her Savage (also known as Red Headed Savage), is a 1932 American pre-Code drama film directed by John Francis Dillon. The film was based on the book of the same name by Tiffany Thayer, which contains themes of promiscuity, sadism, and lesbianism.

The film stars Clara Bow, Gilbert Roland, Thelma Todd, Monroe Owsley, Estelle Taylor, Weldon Heyburn and Willard Robertson. The movie was Bow's first return to the screen after she had experienced a nervous breakdown, and took a temporary leave of absence from appearing in any films, and it was Bow's second-to-last film role.

Its portrayal of a scene in a gay bar would become impossible in less than two years, when enforcement of the Hays Code became more stringent. Hays office was not pleased with the racier content in the film, and instructed Fox to "clean it up", and Fox initially complied by removing most of the "offensive sexual material." (Note: Objectionable content included: "marital infidelity, interracial marital infidelity, sadomasochistic whipping, erotic frolicking with a Great Dane, prurient exposure of female flesh, kept women, femme-on-femme catfights, a demented husband who tries to rape his wife, prostitution, gigolos, and a pair of mincing homosexual waiters.") Nonetheless, during an additional rewrite of the script, most of the aforementioned material made its way back into the film.

== Plot ==
A wild young woman, Nasa Springer, born and raised in Texas by well-to-do parents, rebels against her father. She is sent to school in Chicago, where her disruptive behavior marks her as a troublemaker.

She marries a rich playboy, who then declares the marriage a ploy and abandons her. She is renounced by her father, who tells her he never wishes to see her again. She discovers she is pregnant and bears a child. Reduced to poverty, she moves into a boardinghouse with her infant, and struggles to pay for the baby's basic needs.

Unaware that her grandfather in Texas has died and left her a $100,000 fortune, a desperate Nasa dresses up as a prostitute and goes out in the neighborhood hoping to earn some quick cash to purchase medicine for her child. While she is out, a drunken lout at the boardinghouse drops a match and accidentally sets the building on fire. Nasa's infant is killed in the blaze.

Upon learning that her mother is dying, she hurries home to Texas. There she learns that she is a "half-breed", half white and half Indian. The assertion is made that this explains why she had always been "untameable and wild."

This knowledge of her lineage would supposedly allow her the possibility for happiness in the arms of a handsome young "half-breed" Indian named Moonglow, a longtime friend who has secretly loved her.

== Cast ==
- Clara Bow as Nasa Springer
- Gilbert Roland as Moonglow
- Thelma Todd as Sunny De Lane
- Monroe Owsley as Lawrence Crosby
- Estelle Taylor as Ruth Springer
- Weldon Heyburn as Ronasa
- Willard Robertson as Pete Springer
- Anthony Jowitt as Jay Randall
- Oscar Apfel as Doctor
- Frank Atkinson as Stevens
- Fred Kohler as Silas Jennings
- Russell Simpson as Old Man in Wagon Train
- Margaret Livingston as Molly
- Carl Stockdale as Mort
- Dorothy Peterson as Silas' Wife
- Marilyn Knowlden as Ruth (as a girl)
- Douglas Haig (uncredited) as Pete (as a boy)
- Mischa Auer as Agitator in restaurant
- Symona Boniface as Gambling lady
- Edmund Burns as Jack Carter

== Background and production ==
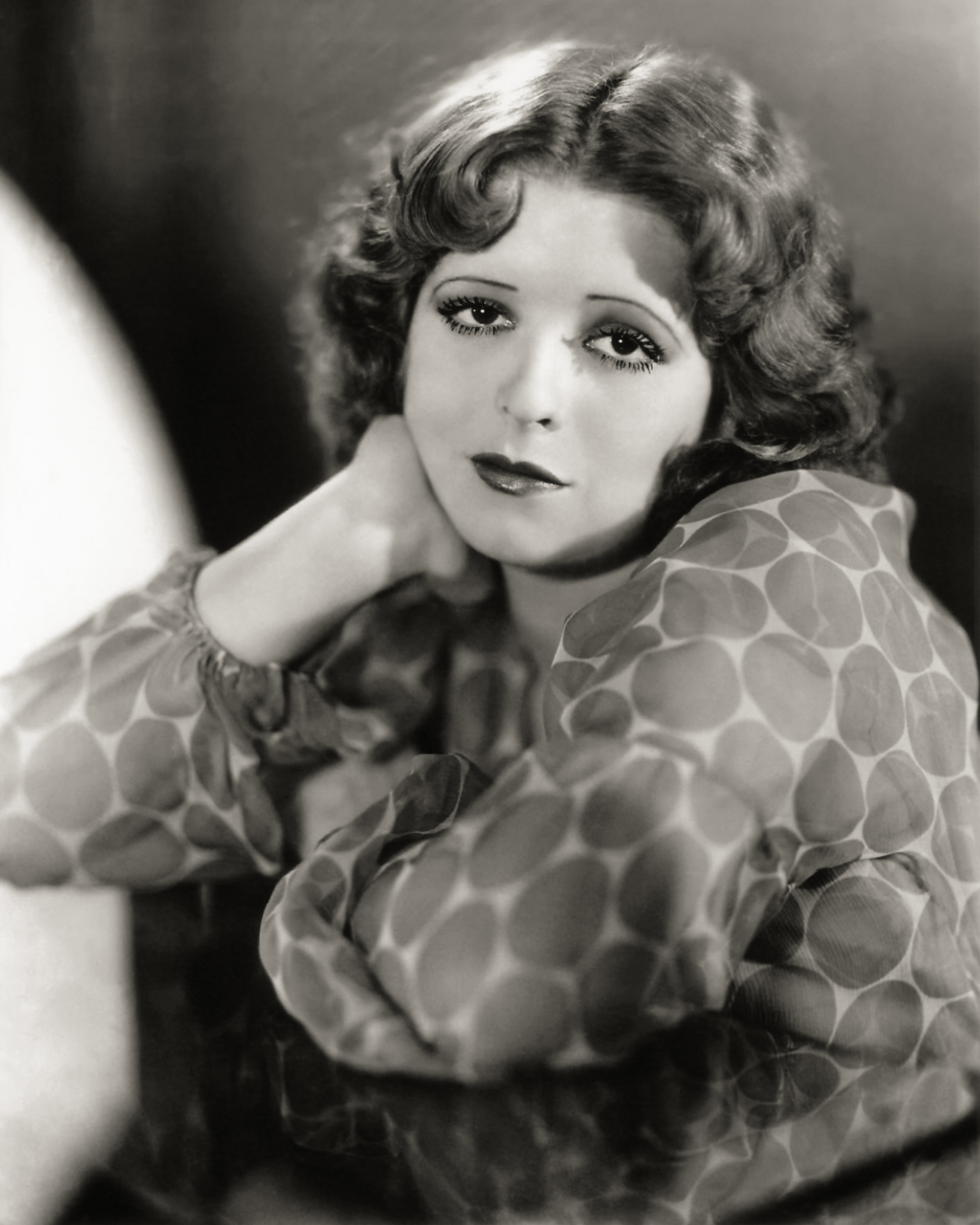
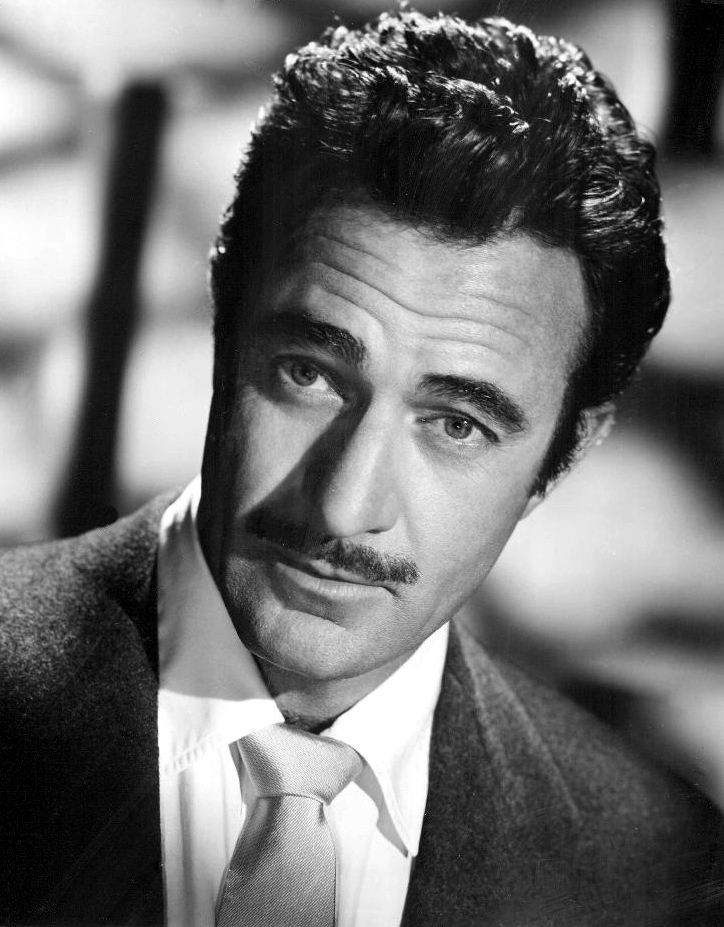
Clara Bow and her co-star Gilbert Roland

The film marked Bow's first return to the screen after she had experienced a nervous breakdown, and took a temporary leave of absence from appearing in any films. In her new contract with Fox Films, Bow negotiated more control over her return. Bow negotiated a salary of $75,000 (equivalent to $1,724,451 in 2024), for her return to the screen, and a $25,000 bonus if the picture grossed over $800,000. In addition to the monetary obligations, she also obtained script, director, co-star approval, and a closed set during filming.

Fox reopened its unused Western Avenue studios for the shooting, and John Francis Dillon, the director, was hired with her approval, and after testing Joel McCrea as a favor to her husband Rex Bell, she instead chose Gilbert Roland for her leading man. As part of her contract with Fox, Bow also agreed to reduce her weight to 118 pounds and maintain that weight, and Fox agreed to furnish a masseuse selected by Bow, and in addition, a "voice culture specialist" was provided by the studio to help her with her dialogue.

Bow personally selected the novel, Call Her Savage, by Tiffany Thayer to be adapted for her first project with Fox. Sam Rork then bought the rights from Thayer, and in turn sold it to Fox. Jason Joy, who was head of the Hays committee at the time, said the "book is about as far wrong as it is possible to be", due to the novel having themes of incest, masturbation, transvestism, venereal disease, and being "patently racist". (Note: According to Tiffany Thayer, the author of the novel, "the background and local color, and some of the incidents, were all based on the life of my wife, who was a resident of Texas and is one-half Osage Indian.")

When the first draft of the project was completed, Joy observed that the writer had taken "most of the real flavor of the story" out of it, which resulted in just "another stupid movie was in prospect". So Rork worked with Al Rockett and Edwin Burker to refine the story, which resulted in adding back more of the racier content into the screenplay. When the screenplay was finished, Joy wrote to the censor boards in New York, Pennsylvania, Virginia, Ohio, Maryland, Kansas, Manitoba, Halifax, New Brunswick, Edmonton, Vancouver, Montreal and Saskatchewan, advising them that:

I doubt if there is any personality today in pictures whose return to the screen after a year's absence could have aroused such universal interest. Every effort, of course, was exerted to find just the right vehicle for Miss Bow, and I am confident her re-appearance will be a revelation to the country... Because it is a new Clara Bow that the screen is presenting, we are all very hopeful that the picture will be judged as a whole for the character study that it is, all parts of which inter-link importantly. (Note: The film was released before the strict enforcement of the MPPDA Production Code went into effect in the mid-1930s, which "explicitly banned suggestions of miscegenation, or sex between individuals of different races", from being included in Hollywood films.)

The majority of the censor boards ignored Joy's letter, and ended up cutting the film anyway at various places they deemed offensive, and the "British censors refused to pass the film without stating a reason".

Clip from movie with gay bar scene

One scene that was not cut, which is widely considered to be the first depiction of a gay bar in a pre-Code American film, is where Bow is out on the town in New York "slumming" it up with a gigolo, and when Bow asks where they are going, he replies: "down in the Village where only wild poets and anarchists eat." According to LGBTQ film historian Vito Russo, the lyrics from the song the two "willowy young men" are performing in the scene at the bar, "erase any doubt about the sexuality" of the characters. Following the strict enforcement of the Motion Picture Production Code in 1934, such explicit depictions disappeared from mainstream Hollywood cinema for decades. The next major American film widely noted for showing a gay bar was thirty years later in Otto Preminger's Advise & Consent in 1962.

== Release ==
The film premiered at New York's Roxy Theater, on November 24, 1932. The movie set a new one day attendance record at the Roxy with 18,171 patrons, and grossed $34,000 in its first week at the theater. (Note: Variety Magazine reported that the film did "around $53,000" for the first seven days at the Roxy.) By December 10, the film had grossed $58,000 at Roxy, and the following week, it grossed $13,800 at New York's Loew's Theater. The Film Daily reported that same month that it had attracted an audience of over 900,000 when it was showcased in 42 first-run cities. The film ended up being the "Box Office Champion" for December 1932. Despite the attendance records, and critical acclaim for Bow's return to moviemaking, the film only made a profit of $17,407. American biographer David Stenn opined that:

Call Her Savage proved that Clara was still a star. New York's 6,200 seat Roxy, the largest movie theater in America, had its highest-grossing week since its reopening after renovations. In other cities the stampede for tickets caused box offices to close early.

=== Preservation status ===
The film was restored in 2012 by the Museum of Modern Art film-preservation series "To Save and Project." The movie was shown in October that year. Melissa Anderson from Artforum remarked that "racy even by pre-Code standards — and more lurid than anything Lee Daniels could ever dream up — Call Her Savage has whips, booze, dope, v.d., attempted rape and child molestation, intimations of bestiality, girl fights, gay bars, streetwalking, and a dead baby; it was, in short, the perfect comeback vehicle for Bow." R. Emmet Sweeney of Film Comment quipped that "no one could possibly steal Call Her Savage from Clara Bow, who gives a performance of loose-limbed, unhinged battiness; she fully inhabits the character of Nasa 'Dynamite' Springer." The film's copyright was renewed, and the film will enter the public domain in 2028.

=== Home media ===
The film was released on DVD in 2014, by 20th Century Fox Cinema Archives. According to DVD Talk, they believe the DVD was not "mastered from MoMA's restoration, but is instead from a dupe of a worn film element." They went on to state the DVD has "reasonable image quality", but it is "marred by a pattern of light scratch marks printed into the image from beginning to end."

== Reception ==
Film critic Mordaunt Hall observed that, "Miss Bow does quite well by the role of this fiery-tempered impulsive Nasa, but whether the flow of incidents makes for satisfactory entertainment is a matter of opinion." Film historian Mary Mallory wrote the movie "revealed Clara at her sexy, passionate best, a scandalous wildcat who upends convention while defeating all manner of destruction thrown her way; an over-the-top melodrama with plenty of pre-Code sexual scandal and innuendo, the film allowed Bow to play a real woman and burn up the screen with sexual intensity and desire."

The Film Daily wrote: "looking like a million dollars, acting better than she ever did, and playing a role that requires her to pretty near run the gamut of feminine moods and modes, Clara Bow makes a whirlwind comeback; it's a real Roman holiday for her; except for a sequence along past the middle of the picture where some stale melodramatics are introduced... the story is all swell action stuff, even though it is sometimes beyond credulity." Critic Leonard Maltin gave the film a two and ½ star rating, commenting that it was a "wild comeback vehicle for indefatigable Clara Bow that ranges from sharp comedy to teary-eyed soap opera, but it is never dull; Bow is amazingly sensual throughout, matched in brief confrontations with Todd; great fun."

Film critic Richard Watts Jr. opined that "despite certain definite weaknesses in her manner of dramatized emotions, she is, as always, a vivid and arresting screen personage, who plays with so much amiable vitality that she remains an invariably interesting performer to watch." Alfred Greason of Variety commented that "here the part is ideal for her, and especially for her first attempt on her re-entrance to cinemania; the only men in the cast, in unsympathetic roles, played quietly and efficiently, but engaging interest only through their relation to the heroine, who is the whole picture, and abundantly capable of holding any audience's attention for the full stretch of the feature."

== See also ==
- Pre-Code sex films
- Circumventing censorship with alternate footage
- List of pre-Code films
- List of American films of 1932
- List of LGBTQ-related films of the 1930s

== Sources ==
- Russo, Vito (1981). The Celluloid Closet. New York: Harper & Row. ISBN 0-06-013704-5.
