= Red Dust (1932 film) =

American pre-Code romantic drama film

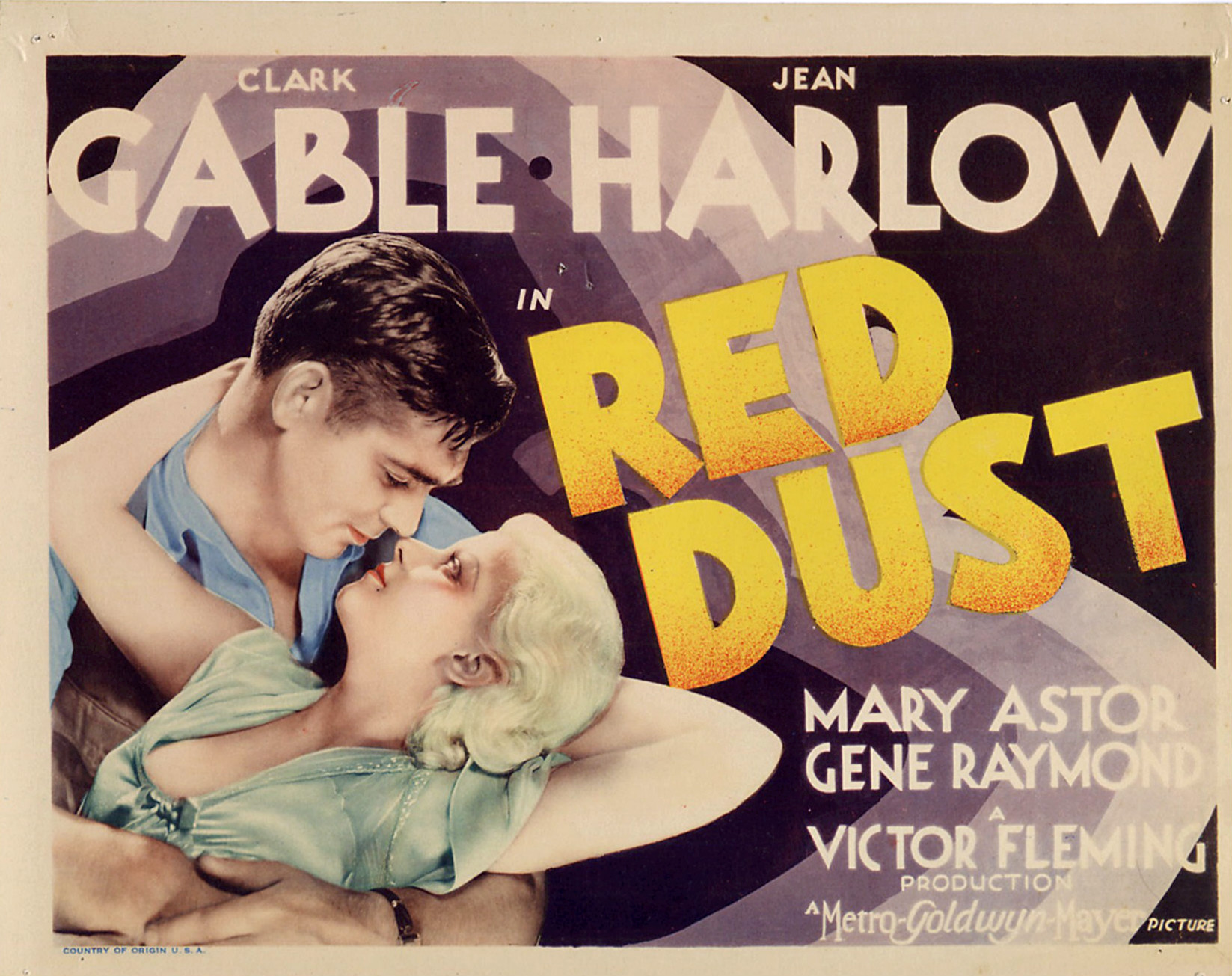
- Theatrical release poster
- Directed by: Victor Fleming
- Written by: Donald Ogden Stewart (uncredited)
- Screenplay by: John Mahin
- Based on: Red Dust; 1928 play by Wilson Collison
- Produced by: Hunt Stromberg (uncredited); Irving Thalberg (uncredited)
- Starring: Clark Gable; Jean Harlow; Mary Astor; Gene Raymond
- Cinematography: Harold Rosson; Arthur Edeson
- Edited by: Blanche Sewell
- Distributed by: Metro-Goldwyn-Mayer
- Release date: October 22, 1932
- Running time: 83 minutes
- Country: United States
- Language: English
- Budget: $408,000
- Box office: $1.2 million

Red Dust is a 1932 American pre-Code romantic drama film directed by Victor Fleming, and starring Clark Gable, Jean Harlow, and Mary Astor. It is based on the 1928 play of the same name by Wilson Collison, and was adapted for the screen by John Mahin. Red Dust is the second of six movies Gable and Harlow made together. More than 20 years later, Gable starred in a remake, Mogambo (1953), with Ava Gardner starring in a variation on the role Harlow played and Grace Kelly playing a part similar to one portrayed by Astor in Red Dust.

The film, set on a rubber plantation in French Indochina (present-day Vietnam), provides a view into the French colonial rubber business. It includes scenes of rubber trees being tapped for sap, the process of coagulating the rubber with acid, native workers being rousted, gales that can blow the roof off a hut and are difficult to walk in, the spartan living quarters, the supply boat that arrives periodically, a rainy spell that lasts weeks, and tigers prowling the jungle. The film's title is derived from the large quantities of dust stirred up by storms.

In 2006, Red Dust was selected for preservation in the United States National Film Registry by the Library of Congress as "culturally, historically, or aesthetically significant".

== Plot ==
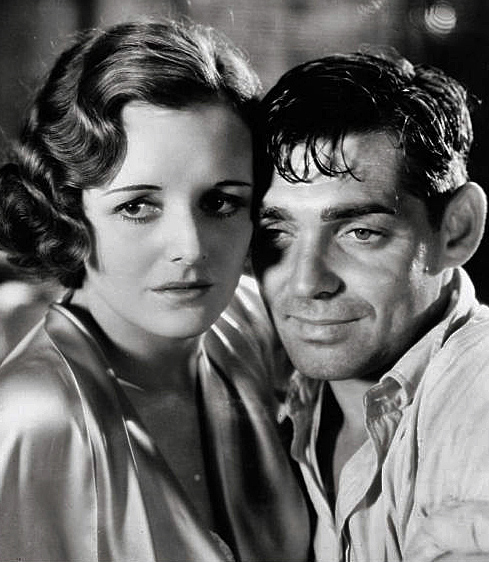
Mary Astor and Clark Gable in Red Dust

On a rubber plantation in French Indochina during the monsoon season, the plantation's owner/manager Dennis Carson, a prostitute named Vantine, and Barbara Willis, the wife of engineer Gary Willis are involved in a love triangle. Dennis abandons an informal relationship with Vantine to pursue Barbara, but has a change of heart and returns to Vantine. This all unspools against the backdrop of racial and labor tension with local workers ("coolies"), overseer Guidon's drunkenness, a roaming tiger, frequent wind and rain, and servant Hoy providing comic relief.

Vantine arrives at the plantation first, on the lam from the authorities in Saigon. She shows an easy comfort in the plantation's harsh environment, wisecracks continually, and begins playfully teasing Dennis as soon as she meets him, including byplay over the merits of Roquefort vs. Gorgonzola cheese. He resists her charms at first, but soon gives in, and they quickly develop a friendly, casual relationship where they tease each other and pretend to be too tough for affection. They call each other "Fred" and "Lily", as though neither can be bothered to remember the other's name.

However, Dennis loses interest in Vantine when the Willises arrive. Gary Willis is a young, inexperienced engineer, and his wife Barbara a classy, ladylike beauty. Dennis is immediately attracted to Barbara, and, after sending Gary on a lengthy surveying trip, he spends the next week seducing Barbara as Vantine watches jealously. He successfully persuades Barbara to leave Gary, but recants after visiting Gary in the swamp and learning how deeply he loves Barbara. Dennis has also seen that Barbara is unsuited for the plantation's primitive conditions, as is Gary, and has a painful memory of his own mother's death on the plantation when he was a boy. He decides to send both of them back to more civilized surroundings.

At the story's climax, Dennis turns Barbara's feelings against him by pretending he never loved her, at which point she shoots him. This provides a cover for Vantine and Dennis to save Barbara's marriage and reputation by insisting to Gary that Barbara rejected Dennis's advances. Gary says he would have shot Dennis if his wife hadn't. The film ends after Dennis has sent the Willises away, with Vantine reading bedtime stories to him as he recuperates from the gunshot wound, as he playfully tries to fondle her, and wisecracks, "Roquefort or Gorgonzola?" before Hoy pokes his head into the room, titters, and has a pillow thrown at him.

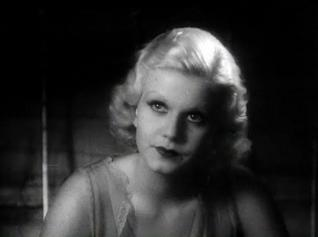
Jean Harlow

== Cast ==
- Clark Gable as Dennis Carson
- Jean Harlow as Vantine Jefferson
- Mary Astor as Barbara Willis
- Gene Raymond as Gary Willis
- Tully Marshall as "Mac" McQuarg, overseer
- Donald Crisp as Guidon, overseer
- Willie Fung as Hoy, house servant
- Forrester Harvey as Captain Limey

== Production ==
According to John Lee Mahin, the original director was meant to be Jacques Feyder and the original stars were supposed to be John Gilbert and Jean Harlow. Mahin says he suggested Clark Gable play the lead instead of Gilbert to Hunt Stromberg, who agreed. The budget was increased and Feyder was removed from the film.

One of the movie's most memorable scenes has Harlow taking a bath in a rain barrel. The scene is referenced in another Harlow film, Bombshell, where the set from this movie is replicated. According to legend, during the scene's filming, a topless Harlow stood up in the barrel and proclaimed, "Here's one for the boys in the lab!"

== Pre-Code-era scenes and publicity photographs ==
Red Dust (1932), a pre-Code Hollywood film, was allowed to show actress Jean Harlow taking a bath, while actor Clark Gable is pulling her hair. A provocative publicity photograph showed Gable embracing Harlow with his hands just below her bosom.

== Reception ==
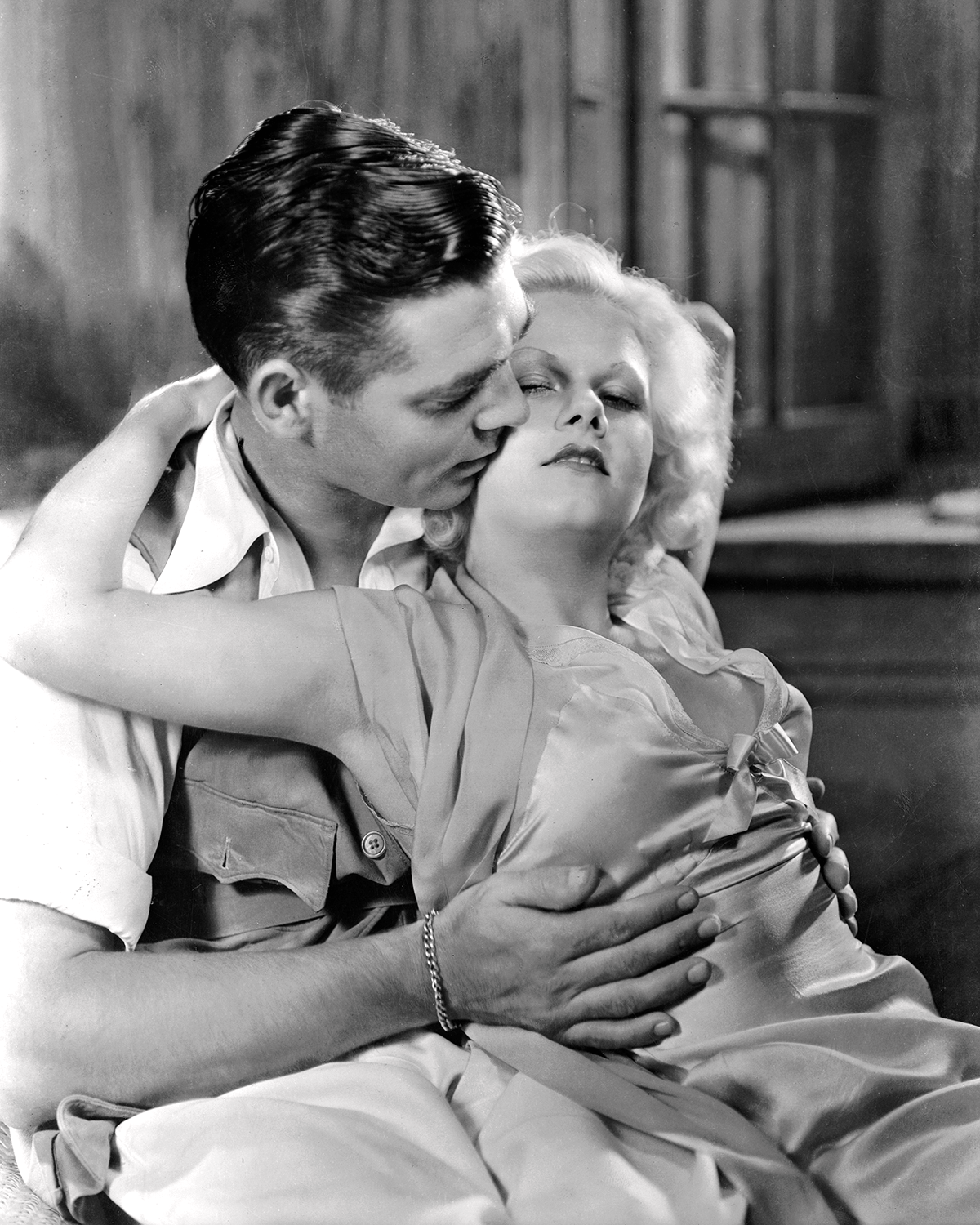
Gable and Harlow in Red Dust

Variety gave the film a lukewarm reception, stating: "Familiar plot stuff, but done so expertly it almost overcomes the basic script shortcomings and the familiar hot-love-in-the-isolated-tropics theme (from the play by Wilson Collison)." Unimpressed with Mary Astor's performance, the reviewer wrote: "Astor is ok in the passive virtuous moments, but falls down badly on the clinches, sustained only by Gable." However, they were complimentary towards Gable's performance, and liked Jean Harlow's portrayal of Vantine: "She plays the light lady to the limit, however, not overdoing anything."

Modern reviewers are more favorably disposed to the movie. Ozus' World Movie Reviews reported: "Great performances from the stars make you forget that Gable played a sexist and that the melodrama bordered on being camp." Ken Hanke of the Mountain Xpress wrote: "Red Dust (1932) is something of an anomaly in that it's everything you don't expect from that most conservative of studios Metro-Goldwyn-Mayer. It is rough, brief, to the point, and gleefully trashy." Three Movie Buffs Movie Reviews wrote: "Clark Gable and Jean Harlow made six movies together, of which Red Dust was their second. With his man's man persona and her sexy, brassy personality, they made a great onscreen couple. Their scenes together are the best parts of an already good movie." Leslie Halliwell included the film in his book Halliwell's Harvest: "It is ... to the credit of Red Dust that it is entirely lacking in good taste and has the feel throughout of a hard-hitting Warner melodrama ... Probably none of the studio heads thought well of it during production; but it made superstars of its two leads as well as drawing memorable performances from at least four other players. It is also remarkable for the amount of steamy sex one could get into a movie in pre-Legion days ... Pauline Kael highlighted Harlow's performance: "Harlow is intensely likable, delivering her zingy wisecracks with a wonderful dirty good humor..."

== Box office ==
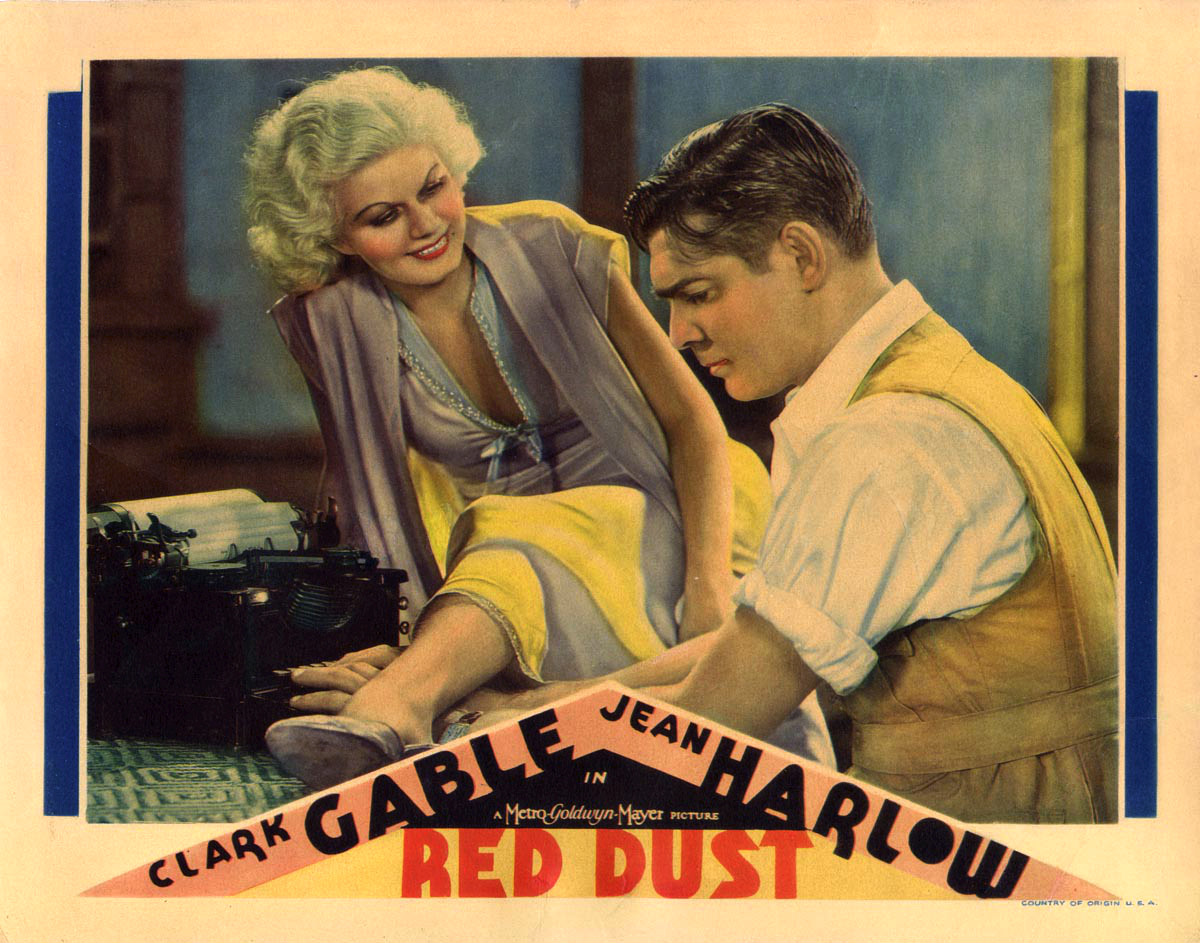
Lobby card

According to MGM records, the film earned $781,000 in the US and Canada, and $442,000 elsewhere, resulting in a profit of $399,000.

== Accolades ==
In 2002, the film was nominated for the American Film Institute's "100 Years...100 Passions" list.

== Remake ==
Red Dust was remade by director John Ford in 1953 as Mogambo, this time set in Africa rather than Indochina, and shot on location in color by Technicolor, with Ava Gardner playing Harlow's role and Grace Kelly in Astor's part. Clark Gable returned to play the same character he portrayed twenty-one years earlier. Ford used African tribal music as the film's score.

== Home media ==
Red Dust was first released to home media on VHS by MGM. In November 2012, the Warner Archive Collection released it on manufactured-on-demand DVD. Warner Archive Collection released it on Blu-ray for the first time on January 27, 2026, featuring the new 4K restoration from the best surviving elements.
