= Little Caesar (film) =

1931 film

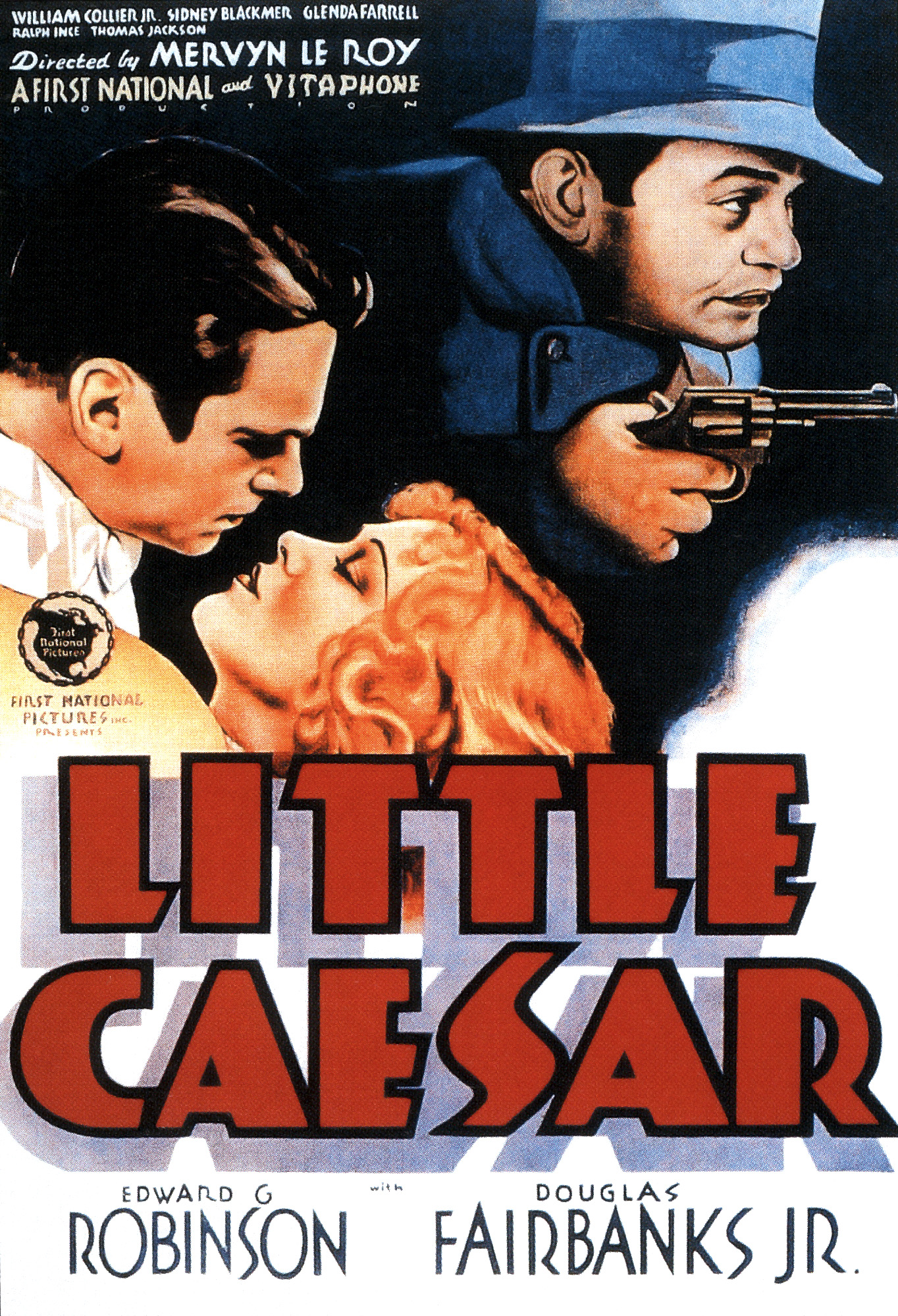
- Theatrical release poster
- Directed by: Mervyn LeRoy
- Written by: Francis Edward Faragoh; Robert N. Lee; Uncredited: Robert Lord; Darryl F. Zanuck
- Based on: Little Caesar (1929 novel) by W. R. Burnett
- Produced by: Hal B. Wallis; Darryl F. Zanuck
- Starring: Edward G. Robinson; Douglas Fairbanks Jr. Glenda Farrell
- Cinematography: Tony Gaudio
- Edited by: Ray Curtiss
- Music by: Ernö Rapée
- Production company: First National Pictures
- Distributed by: Warner Bros. Pictures
- Release date: January 9, 1931
- Running time: 79 minutes
- Country: United States
- Language: English
- Budget: $281,000
- Box office: $752,000

Little Caesar is a 1931 American pre-Code gangster film directed by Mervyn LeRoy and distributed by Warner Bros. Pictures. It stars Edward G. Robinson, Douglas Fairbanks Jr. and Glenda Farrell. Robinson portrays the titular role of Caesar "Rico" Bandello, a hoodlum who ascends the ranks of organized crime until he reaches its upper echelons. The film is based on the 1929 novel by W. R. Burnett.

The film was Robinson's breakthrough role and immediately made him a major film star. The film is often listed as one of the first fully-fledged gangster films and continues to be well received by critics. The Library of Congress maintains a print. Due to the film being registered for copyright late in 1930, it entered the public domain on January 1, 2026.

== Plot ==
Little Caesar (1931)

Small-time criminals Caesar Enrico "Rico" Bandello and his friend Joe Massara move to Chicago to seek their fortunes. Rico joins the gang of Sam Vettori, while Joe wants to be a dancer. Olga becomes his dance partner and girlfriend.

Joe tries to drift away from the gang and its activities, but Rico makes him participate in the robbery of the nightclub where he works. Despite orders from underworld overlord "Big Boy" to all his men to avoid bloodshed, Rico guns down crusading crime commissioner Alvin McClure during the robbery, with Joe as an aghast witness. Tony, the gang's driver who becomes distraught after the job, is later killed by the gang under Rico's orders when he goes to reveal the news to the local priest.

Rico accuses Sam of becoming soft and seizes control of his organization (the "Palermo Gang"), the anointment celebrated at a banquet honoring Rico at the Palermo Club. Rival boss "Little Arnie" Lorch tries to have Rico killed, but Rico is only grazed. He and his gunmen pay Little Arnie a visit, giving him a choice of either leaving town or being killed, after which Arnie hastily departs for Detroit. The Big Boy eventually gives Rico control of all of Chicago's Northside.

Rico becomes concerned that Joe knows too much about him. He warns Joe that he must forget about Olga and join him in a life of crime. Rico threatens to kill both Joe and Olga unless he accedes, but Joe refuses to give in. Olga calls Police Sergeant Flaherty and tells him Joe is ready to talk, just before Rico and his henchman Otero come calling. Rico finds, to his surprise, that he is unable to take his friend's life. When Otero tries to do the job himself, Rico wrestles the gun away from him, though not before Joe is wounded in the shoulder. Hearing the shot, Flaherty and another police officer give chase and shoot and kill Otero. With information provided by Olga, Flaherty proceeds to crush Rico's organization beginning with the arrest of Sam Vettori and his henchmen.

Desperate and alone, Rico "retreats to the gutter from which he sprang." While hiding in a flophouse, he becomes enraged when he learns that Flaherty has called him a coward in the newspaper. He foolishly telephones the police to announce he is coming for him. The call is traced, and Flaherty confronts Rico outside the flophouse with several officers. Flaherty tries to coax Rico into standing down and allowing himself to be arrested but Rico refuses and Flaherty guns him down while he hides behind a billboard; an advertisement featuring dancers Joe and Olga. With Flaherty standing over him, Rico utters his final words, "Mother of mercy, is this the end of Rico?"

== Cast ==
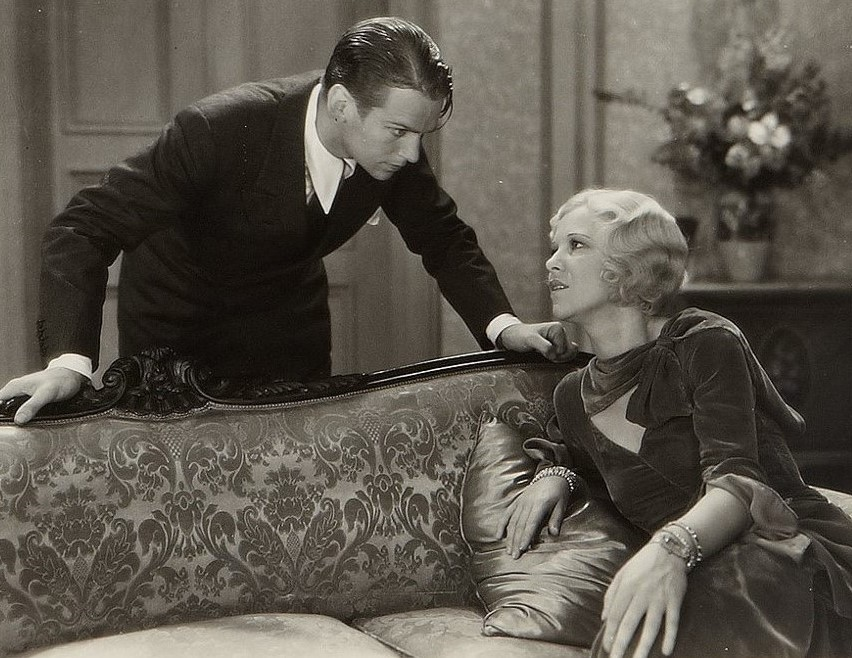
Douglas Fairbanks Jr. (left) as Joe and Glenda Farrell (right) as Olga.

- Edward G. Robinson as Caesar Enrico "Rico" Bandello
- Douglas Fairbanks Jr. as Joe Massara
- Glenda Farrell as Olga Stassoff
- William Collier Jr. as Antonio "Tony" Passa
- Sidney Blackmer as "Big Boy"
- Ralph Ince as Pete Montana
- Thomas E. Jackson as Sergeant Thomas Flaherty
- Stanley Fields as Sam Vettori
- Maurice Black as Little Arnie Lorch
- George E. Stone as Otero

Uncredited

- Landers Stevens as Commissioner Alvin McClure
- Al Hill as Rico's butler
- Elmer Ballard as Bat Carilla
- Noel Maddison as Killer Peppi
- Henry Sedley as Scabby
- Ben Hendricks Jr. as Kid Bean
- Ferike Boros as Mrs. Passa
- Lucille La Verne as Ma Magdalena

== Original novel ==
Burnett moved to Chicago in 1928 and wrote the novel based on his observations and research. He later said:

I was reaching for a gutter Macbeth—a composite figure that would indicate how men could rise to prominence or money under the most hazardous conditions, but not much more hazardous than the men of the Renaissance... if you have this type of society, it will produce such men. That’s what I was looking for, a type. Rico was doomed from the first. If he had a tragic flaw, it was over-impulsive action. But he is the picture of overriding ambition.

Contrary to popular belief, the titular character was not based on Al Capone, but was composite character based on various individuals, notably Sam Cardinelli. Several film historians have suggested that Joe Massara is based on George Raft. "Big Boy" was a reference to "Big Bill" Hale Thompson, the notoriously corrupt mayor of Chicago. Pete Montana was based upon Chicago Outfit boss "Big Jim" Colosimo.

The novel was a best seller. Burnett attributed this to the fact "it was the world seen completely through the eyes of a gangster. It’s a commonplace now, but it had never been done before then."

== Production ==
The film's trailer

=== Writing ===
According to Burnett, an initial script was written by Rowland V. Lee but LeRoy "threw it out". The script was rewritten by Francis E. Faragoh. Burnett said "It was not a good script, although he did get the important thing in, which is the character of Rico. Otherwise, the script is taken straight out of the book, except for the ending, in which Rico dies in a flophouse."

=== Casting ===
Clark Gable was sought out for a role in the film, albeit with conflicting perspectives in memoirs; Jack L. Warner said that LeRoy wanted Gable for the lead role, while LeRoy stated that he wanted Gable for the second lead role, but at any rate Warner turned Gable down.

Robinson had already played a gangster in plays such as The Racket and The Widow from Chicago (1930), a First National Pictures production. Hal B. Wallis originally offered him the supporting part of Otero, but he declined, saying "If you're going to have me in Little Caesar as Otero, you will completely imbalance the picture. The only part I will consider playing is Little Caesar."

Burnett was disappointed with the film because "they conventionalized it" but felt it was saved by Robinson's performance.

== Reception ==
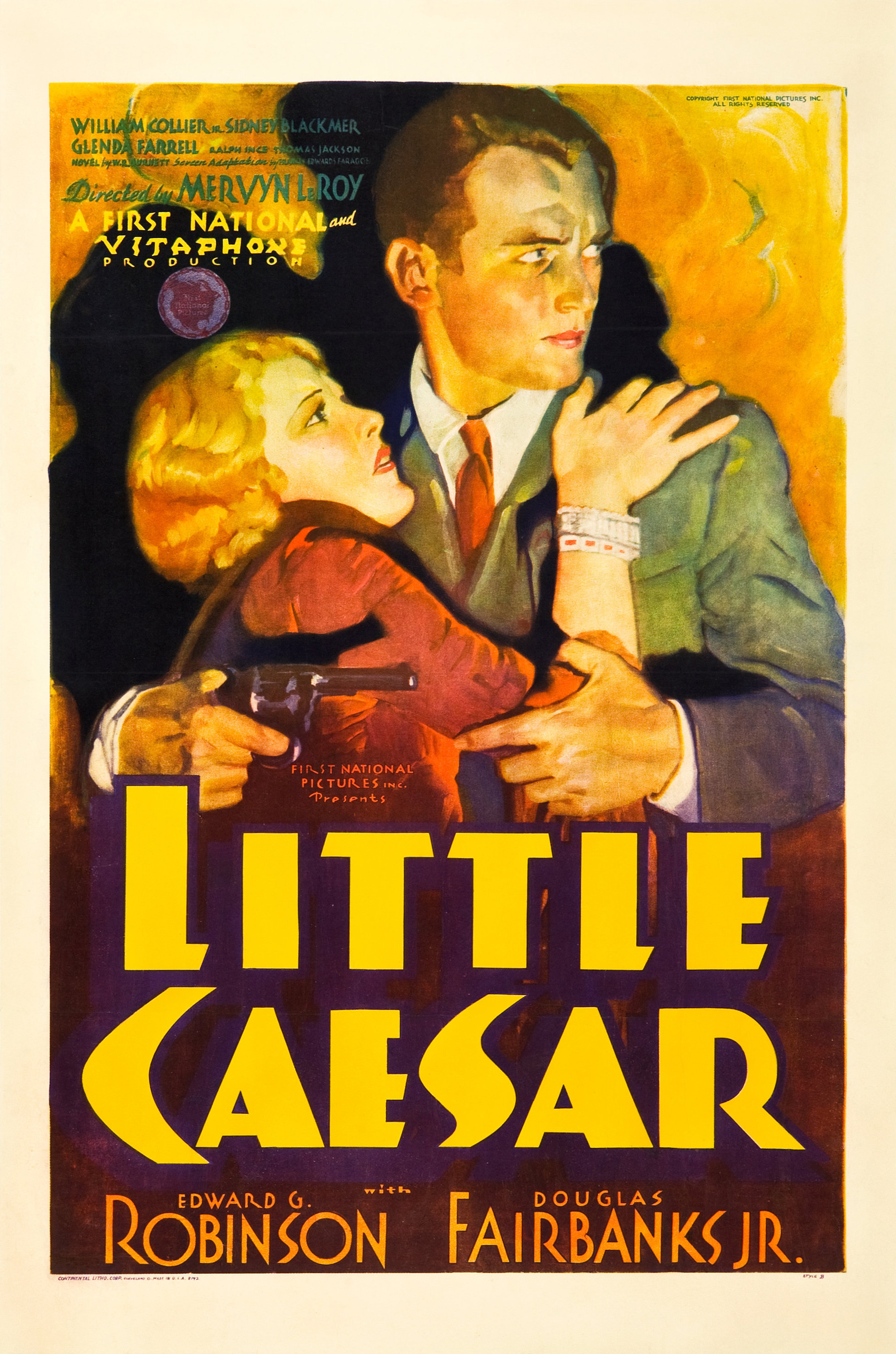
Alternate theatrical release poster

The film received widespread acclaim from critics and audiences at the time and still is well received to this day.

On review aggregator Rotten Tomatoes, Little Caesar holds an approval rating of 96%, based on 26 reviews, and an average rating of 7.5/10. The website's critics consensus reads: "Little Caesar achieves epic stature thanks to Edward G. Robinson's volcanic charisma, forging a template for the big-screen mobster archetype that's yet to be surpassed."

=== Award and honors ===
- 4th Academy Awards: Adapted Screenplay ‒ Nominated
- National Film Registry: Selected for preservation by the Library of Congress in 2000
- American Film Institute:
  - AFI's 100 Years...100 Movies: Nominated in both 1998 and 2007
  - AFI's 100 Years...100 Thrills: Nominated
  - AFI's 100 Years...100 Heroes and Villains: Rico – #38 villain
  - AFI's 100 Years...100 Movie Quotes: "Mother of mercy, is this the end of Rico?"– #73
  - AFI's 10 Top 10: #9 gangster film

== Legacy ==
Together with The Public Enemy (1931) and Scarface (1932), Little Caesar proved to be influential in developing the gangster film genre, establishing many themes and conventions that have been used since then.

The film's box office success also spawned the production of several successful gangster films, many of which were also made by Warner Brothers. It is listed in the film reference book 1001 Movies You Must See Before You Die, which says "Mervyn LeRoy's Little Caesar helped to define the gangster movie while serving as an allegory of production circumstances because it was produced during the Great Depression— Leavening this theme alongside the demands of social conformity during the early 1930s means that LeRoy's screen classic is far more than the simple sum of its parts."

== Home media ==
A DVD version was released in 2005. Warner Home Video released the film on Blu-ray on May 21, 2013.

== See also ==
- Pre-Code crime films
- History of Pre-Code Hollywood: Crime films

== Notes ==
- McGilligan, Patrick; Mate, Ken (1986). "W.R. Burnett: The Outsider". In McGilligan, Patrick (ed.). Backstory : interviews with screenwriters of Hollywood's golden age. University of California press. p. 49-84.
