= Baby Face (film) =

1933 film by Alfred E. Green

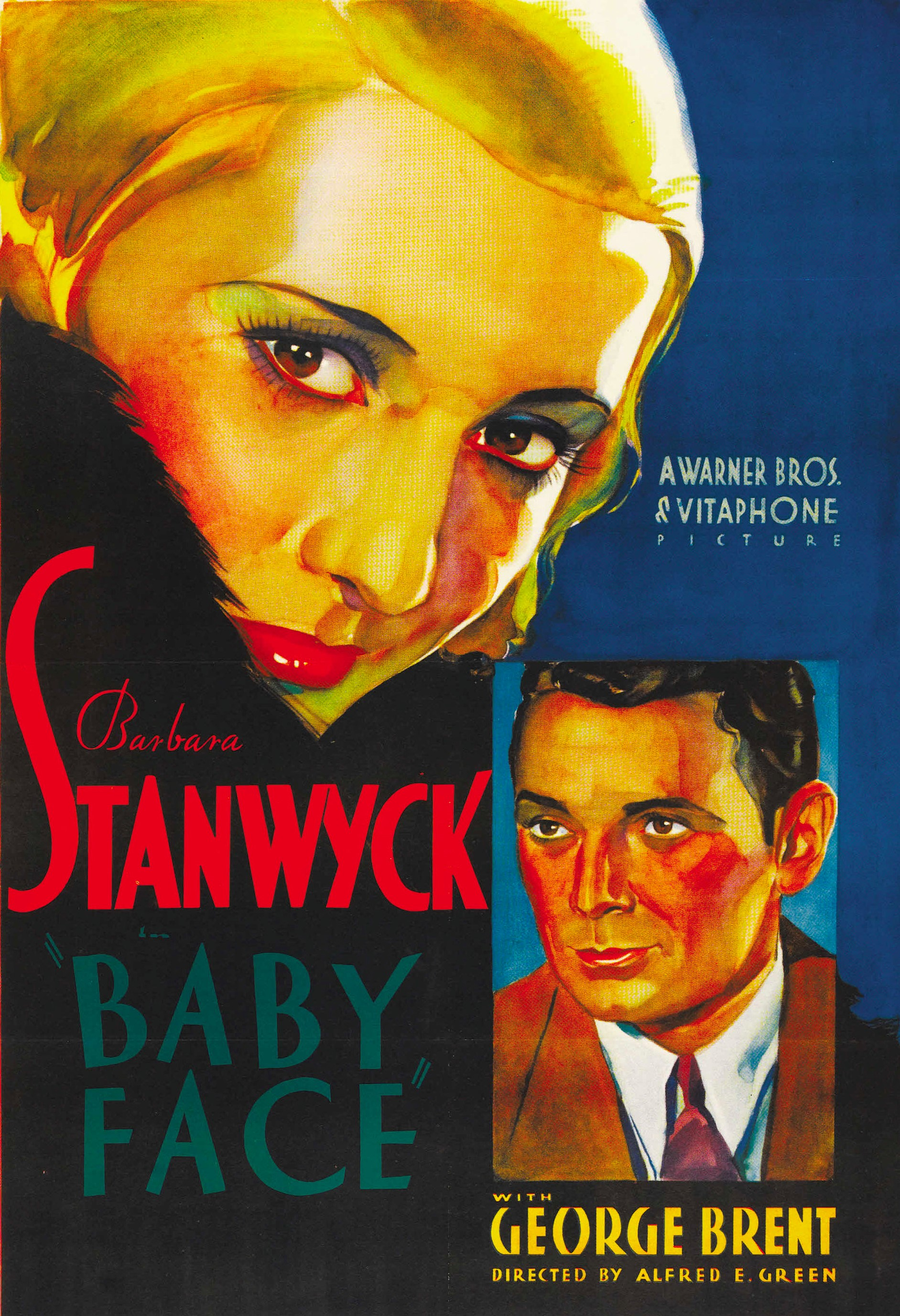
- Theatrical release poster
- Directed by: Alfred E. Green
- Screenplay by: Gene Markey; Kathryn Scola
- Story by: "Mark Canfield" (Darryl F. Zanuck)
- Produced by: William LeBaron; Raymond Griffith
- Starring: Barbara Stanwyck; George Brent
- Cinematography: James Van Trees
- Edited by: Howard Bretherton
- Production company: Warner Bros. Pictures
- Distributed by: Warner Bros. Pictures
- Release date: July 1, 1933 (US)
- Running time: 76 minutes 71 minutes (censored version)
- Country: United States
- Language: English
- Budget: $187,000
- Box office: $452,000

Baby Face is a 1933 American pre-Code romantic comedy drama film directed by Alfred E. Green for Warner Bros. Pictures, starring Barbara Stanwyck as Lily Powers, and featuring George Brent. Based on a story by Darryl F. Zanuck (under the pseudonym Mark Canfield), Baby Face portrays a young woman who uses sex to advance her social and financial status. Twenty-five-year-old John Wayne appears briefly as one of Powers's lovers.

Marketed with the salacious tagline "She had it and made it pay", the film's open discussion of sex made it one of the most notorious films of the Pre-Code Hollywood era and helped bring the era to a close; beginning in 1934, enforcement of the code became stricter. Mark A. Vieira, author of Sin in Soft Focus: Pre-Code Hollywood, has said: "Baby Face was certainly one of the top 10 films that caused the Production Code to be enforced." In late 2005, Baby Face was selected for preservation in the National Film Registry of the Library of Congress.

== Plot ==
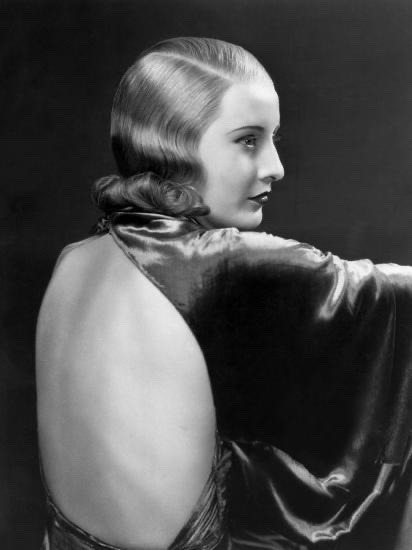
Barbara Stanwyck Baby Face publicity still

Lily Powers, a young woman, works for her father, Nick, in a speakeasy in Erie, Pennsylvania, during Prohibition. Nick has been prostituting her to his customers since she was 14 years old. An influential politician threatens to have the speakeasy shut down after Lily refuses to have sex with him. Nick later dies in an explosion while repairing his burning still.

After Nick's funeral, Lily is offered a job as a stripper at a burlesque club. Cragg, an old friend of hers, disapproves and convinces her that using her sexuality to exploit men financially is better than allowing men to exploit her sexually, urging her to subscribe to a Nietzschean philosophy.

Later, she and her best friend Chico illegally board a freight train to New York City but are discovered by a railroad worker. He threatens to report them to the police, but Lily seduces him and the women remain on the train.

In Manhattan, Lily seeks work at Gotham Trust, an international bank. She seduces the personnel worker to land a clerical job. In the filing department, Lily begins an affair with Jimmy McCoy Jr., who recommends her for promotion to his boss, Brody. She seduces Brody, who promotes her to the mortgage department. Later, Brody and Lily are caught having sex in the ladies' room by a rising young executive, Ned Stevens. Ned fires Brody on the spot. Lily then falsely claims that Brody raped her. Ned believes Lily and gives her a position in his accounting department.

Lily then seduces Ned, who is engaged to Ann Carter, the daughter of First Vice President J. P. Carter. When Ann calls Ned's office to say that she will be visiting, Lily arranges to have Ann see her embracing Ned. Ann runs crying to J. P., who tells Ned to fire Lily. Ned refuses, so J. P. advises Ned to take a vacation and offers to handle the situation. J. P. calls Lily to his office to fire her. Lily salvages her situation by seducing J. P., who installs her in a lavish apartment with Chico as her maid. Ned, who is now smitten with Lily, quits the bank and breaks off his engagement with Ann. He then tracks Lily down on Christmas Day, but she spurns him. On New Year's Day he returns to her apartment to propose but finds J. P. there. Ned shoots J. P. dead and then turns the gun on himself.

Courtland Trenholm, the grandson of Gotham Trust's founder and a playboy, is elected bank president to handle the resulting scandal. The board of directors learns that Lily agreed to sell her diary to the press for $10,000 which includes the stories of her multiple office affairs. Consequently, the board summons her. Lily says that she is a victim of circumstance and wants to move far away, change her name and earn an honest living. The board considers giving her $15,000 to withhold her diary. Courtland, however, sees through her ruse and instead offers her a position at the bank's Paris branch and to pay for her travel expenses. She reluctantly accepts and later changes her name.

When Courtland travels to Paris on business, he finds Lily promoted to head of the travel bureau. He takes her out for dinner and later invites her to travel with him. He falls in love with her during their vacation. Lily suggests marriage and Courtland agrees. Lily then moves back to New York with her new husband.

The bank later fails due to mismanagement which the board unfairly pins on Courtland. He is indicted and must raise money to finance his legal defense. He therefore asks Lily to return all the bonds, stocks and jewelry he gave her. She refuses and books passage on a ship back to Paris. However, she reconsiders while waiting for her ship to leave port.

She searches for Courtland and finds him in his office where he shot himself in the abdomen but still lives. She professes her love for him and says that he can have all of her money. During the ambulance ride, Lily accidentally drops her jewelry case, spilling money and jewels on the floor. When a paramedic points this out, she tearfully says that they do not matter anymore. Courtland opens his eyes and sees Lily.

== Cast ==
- Barbara Stanwyck as Lily Powers
- George Brent as Courtland Trenholm, grandson of Gotham Trust's founder, and its new president
- Donald Cook as Ned Stevens, of Gotham Trust's accounting department (7th floor)
- Alphonse Ethier as Adolf Cragg, a cobbler in Erie
- Henry Kolker as J.P. Carter, Gotham Trust's 1st vice president
- Margaret Lindsay as Ann Carter, J.P.'s daughter
- Arthur Hohl as Ed Sipple, a politician in Erie
- John Wayne as Jimmy McCoy Jr., of Gotham Trust's filing department (3rd floor), one of Lily's early conquests
- Robert Barrat as Nick Powers, Lily's father
- Douglass Dumbrille as Brody, of Gotham Trust's mortgage department (5th floor)
- Theresa Harris as Chico, Lily's friend and maid

=== Uncredited ===
- Nat Pendleton as Stolvich, a customer at Powers' speakeasy
- James Murray as a railroad yard worker (uncredited; only in the pre-release version of the film)
- Harry Gribbon as a security guard at Gotham Trust
- Charles Sellon as Venderleur, of Gotham Trust's board of directors
- Edward Van Sloan as Jameson, of Gotham Trust's board of directors
- James Bush as a clerk at Gotham Trust's Paris branch
- Frank Darien as the manager of Gotham Trust's Paris branch

== Production ==
This film was Warner Bros. Pictures' answer to MGM's Red-Headed Woman (1932) starring Jean Harlow, another pre-Code Hollywood film with a similar theme. Production head Darryl F. Zanuck wrote the treatment for the film and sold it to Warner Bros. for a dollar. The Great Depression was having a devastating effect on the film industry at the time, and many studio personnel were voluntarily taking salary cuts to help. Zanuck did not need the money because he was drawing a weekly salary of $3,500. He later left Warner Bros. and became the head of production at 20th Century Fox.

Aside from its depiction of a seductress, the film is notable for the "comradely" relationship Lily has with African-American Chico, who is her co-worker in Erie, Pennsylvania, and comes with her to New York City. She later becomes Stanwyck's maid, but their relationship remains friendly, and not that of a mistress and her servant. When Lily's father tries to fire Chico, Lily tells him that if Chico goes, she goes. At one point in the film, J.P., annoyed by Chico's singing (“St. Louis Blues”—see below) says, "I wish you'd get rid of that fantastic colored girl,” to which Lily responds, with grim finality, "No. Chico stays."

Stanwyck had influence on the film's script. It was her suggestion that Lily had been forced by her father to have sex with the customers of his speakeasy.

Baby Face was shot in 18 days, and cost $187,000. It made a box office of $452,000.

A publicity still from this film aptly shows Barbara Stanwyck posing next to a stepladder, representing Lily's step-by-step up the ladder of success, as she seduces one man after another.

=== Music ===
An instrumental version of the 1926 hit song "Baby Face", composed by Harry Akst, is played over the opening credits and in later scenes. However, the soundtrack is dominated by an instrumental version of "Saint Louis Blues" by W. C. Handy, particularly when Lily is working on her latest victim. This theme plays as the camera pans from floor to floor on a model of the bank building as she works her way up through the ranks. Theresa Harris sings lines and phrases from “St. Louis Blues” in character as “Chico" throughout the film, and a triumphant brass finish plays at the close of the final scene. Ralph Erwin's “I Kiss Your Hand Madame”, from the 1929 film of the same name, serves as the theme for the romance between Lily and Trenholm.

== Censorship ==
After its initial limited release, the Hays Office recommended that the film be pulled from distribution entirely because of multiple violations of the Production Code. Extensive correspondence took place between Zanuck and Jack L. Warner of Warner Bros. and the Association of Motion Picture Producers (AMPP) about ways to make the film more acceptable to state and city censors. The primary change was to alter the ending to one which showed Lily losing everything and returning to her roots in her home town, where she is content to live a modest lifestyle, thus showing the audience that her sexual vices were not ultimately rewarded. Also, Lily's status as a "kept woman" (a woman who is supported financially by a lover—usually a married man) was made less obvious, and the scene where she seduces a railroad worker in a boxcar, while her friend Chico is on the other side of the car, singing "Saint Louis Blues", was cut.

Another significant change was that the cobbler's enthusiasm for Nietzschean philosophy was replaced by his becoming the moral voice of the film, showing that Lily had been wrong to use her body to succeed. The cobbler's original speech was:

A woman, young, beautiful like you, can get anything she wants in the world. Because you have power over men. But you must use men, not let them use you. You must be a master, not a slave. Look here – Nietzsche says, "All life, no matter how we idealize it, is nothing more nor less than exploitation." That's what I'm telling you. Exploit yourself. Go to some big city where you will find opportunities! Use men! Be strong! Defiant! Use men to get the things you want!

The altered version, with the cobbler as the voice of morality, was:

A woman, young, beautiful like you, can get anything she wants in the world. But there is a right way and a wrong way. Remember, the price of the wrong way is too great. Go to some big city where you will find opportunities! Don't let people mislead you. You must be a master, not a slave. Be clean, be strong, defiant, and you will be a success.

The new lines were dubbed onto an over-the-shoulder shot of the cobbler.

The New York State Censorship Board rejected the film's original version in April 1933, and Warners made the changes described above, as well as cutting some sexually suggestive shots. In June 1933, the Board passed the revised version, which then had a successful release. The film was also initially rejected by the censorship board in Virginia.

The uncensored version remained lost until 2004, when it resurfaced at a Library of Congress film vault in Dayton, Ohio. George Willeman is credited with the discovery. The restored version premiered at the London Film Festival in November 2004. In 2005, it was deemed "culturally, historically, or aesthetically significant" and selected for preservation in the United States Library of Congress National Film Registry and also was named by Time magazine as one of the 100 best movies of the last 80 years. Turner Classic Movies shows the uncensored version.

== Reception ==
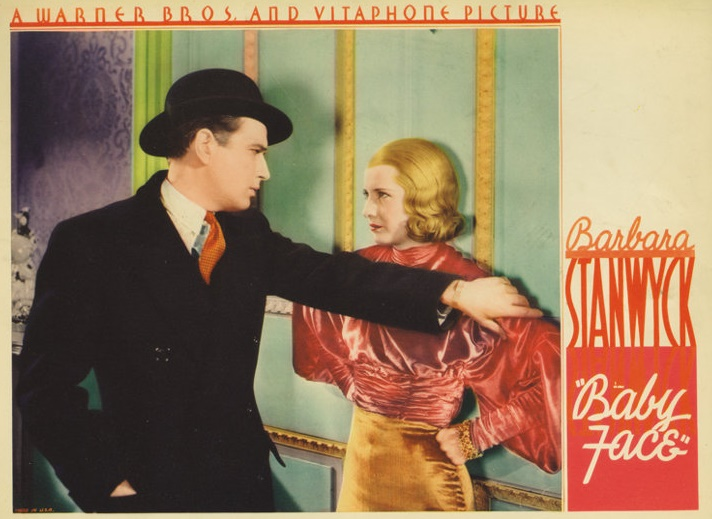
Lobby card

=== Box office ===
According to Warner Bros., the film earned $308,000 domestically and $144,000 foreign.

=== Critical response ===
Reviews contemporary with the film's release were not positive. Mordaunt Hall in The New York Times panned the film, calling it "an unsavory subject, with incidents set forth in an inexpert fashion," while a review in The New York Evening Post said: "You cannot escape the belief that Lily is a vixen of the lowest order and that the men who play with her are doomed to perish in the flames."

Modern reviews are more appreciative. Ty Burr of The Boston Globe called the film "a fascinatingly conflicted artifact of Depression-era do-me feminism. Lily Powers is one of the screen's great hard girls, and Baby Face can't decide whether to celebrate her or string her along." Mick La Salle, movie critic for the San Francisco Chronicle, said: "The differences between the original and the release versions of Baby Face are small, and yet combined they spell the difference between a good three-star movie and a delightful four-star movie."

== See also ==
- Pre-Code sex films
- List of rediscovered films
