= Bombshell (1933 film) =

1933 film

- Directed by: Victor Fleming
- Written by: Norman Krasna
- Screenplay by: John Lee Mahin; Jules Furthman
- Based on: Bombshell by Caroline Francke and Mack Crane
- Produced by: Hunt Stromberg; Irving Thalberg
- Starring: Jean Harlow; Lee Tracy; Frank Morgan; Franchot Tone; Pat O'Brien; Una Merkel; Ted Healy; Mary Forbes; C. Aubrey Smith
- Cinematography: Harold Rosson; Chester A. Lyons
- Edited by: Margaret Booth
- Distributed by: Metro-Goldwyn-Mayer
- Release date: October 13, 1933
- Running time: 96 minutes
- Country: United States
- Language: English
- Budget: $344,000 (estimated)

Bombshell (sometimes advertised as Blonde Bombshell) is a 1933 American pre-Code romantic screwball comedy film directed by Victor Fleming and starring Jean Harlow, Lee Tracy, Frank Morgan, C. Aubrey Smith, Mary Forbes and Franchot Tone. It is based on the unproduced play of the same name by Caroline Francke and Mack Crane, and was adapted for the screen by John Lee Mahin and Jules Furthman.

The story satirizes the stardom years of Clara Bow, the big screen's original "It girl." Its character Lola Burns mirrors Bow, as Pops Burns does Robert Bow (her father), Mac does Daisy DeVoe (her secretary), Gifford Middleton does Rex Bell (her husband), and E. J. Hanlon does B. P. Schulberg (a producer at Paramount). Fleming, the director, was Bow's fiancée in 1926.

== Plot ==
Movie star Lola Burns is angry with her studio publicist E. J. "Space" Hanlon, who feeds the press with endless provocative stories about her. Burns's family and staff are another cause of distress for her, as everybody is always trying to take her money. All Burns really wants is to live a normal life and prove to the public that she is not a sexy vamp, but a proper lady. She attempts a few romances and tries to adopt a baby, but Hanlon, who secretly loves her, thwarts all her plans.

Burns decides she cannot stand any more of such a life, and flees. Far from the movie fluff, she meets the wealthy and romantic Gifford Middleton, who hates the movies and therefore has never heard about Lola Burns and her bad press. They soon fall in love, and Gifford proposes marriage. Burns is to meet her fiancé's parents, but everything collapses when her family finds her, and the Middletons find out she is a movie star. Burns feels hurt by the rude way Gifford and his parents dump her, and accepts Hanlon's suggestion to return to Hollywood with no regrets. She does not know that the three Middletons were all actors hired by Hanlon himself.

At the studio, Burns and Hanlon are kissing when the “Middletons” walk by her dressing room. They have been given jobs on the next Barrymore picture as a reward for helping to bring Burns back to the fold. Infuriated, she flees. Hanlon jumps into the moving car. They are about to kiss when the supposed lunatic who has been pursuing her throughout the film, claiming to be her husband, sticks his head in the window. He greets Hanlon and asks “How’m I doin’?” The shot fades out on the battling couple.

== Cast ==
- Jean Harlow as Lola Burns
- Lee Tracy as E.J. "Space" Hanlon
- Frank Morgan as Pops Burns
- Franchot Tone as Gifford Middleton
- Pat O'Brien as Jim Brogan
- Una Merkel as Mac
- Ted Healy as Junior Burns
- Ivan Lebedeff as Hugo, Marquis Di Binelli Di Pisa
- Isabel Jewell as Lily, Junior's Girl Friend (as Isobel Jewell)
- Louise Beavers as Loretta
- Leonard Carey as Winters
- Mary Forbes as Mrs. Middleton
- C. Aubrey Smith as Mr. Wendell Middleton
- June Brewster as Alice Cole
- Miki Morita as Yokohama (uncredited)

== Production ==
Mahin said the project originally began as a serious melodrama about a girl who worked all her life and committed suicide. He suggested it be turned into a comedy, and Fleming suggested they base it in the life of Clara Bow. Its success led to Harlow's being widely known as a "Blonde Bombshell."

The Laredo Times of Laredo, Texas, quotes Harlow in an interview about filming saying, "Thank goodness, it was not necessary for me to get in the rain barrel in Bombshell. I had to pick too many splinters out of myself the last time," referring to the 1932 film Red Dust, in which her character takes a bath in a rain barrel.

Early in the film, Lola Burns is told she has to shoot re-takes of Red Dust — the title of an actual Harlow/Clark Gable vehicle from the year before. In fact, there's a brief kissing scene with Gable, in the frenetic opening sequence of photos, scenes, and shots of fans, taken from Hold Your Man (1933).

According to the Worldwide Guide to Movie Locations, scenes in Bombshell were shot at MGM studios in Culver City. The nightclub scene was filmed at the Cocoanut Grove club, at the Ambassador Hotel in mid-town Los Angeles. It was demolished in 2006.

== Critical reception ==
Critical reviews were generally favorable. Motion Picture Herald called the film "a comedy wow of the first water," and "one of the funniest, speediest, most nonsensical pictures ever to hit a screen." The Daily News Standard from Pennsylvania gave praise to the film, saying that "Jean Harlow and Lee Tracy together for the first time as co-stars are said to have provided the biggest truckload of laughs to roll out of Hollywood in the hilarious picture." However, Mordaunt Hall for The New York Times said Bombshell has moments where "the comedy is too rambunctious and scenes which are not precisely convincing." He did say it is merry for the most part, and that Jean Harlow was thoroughly "in her element" as the character Lola Burns.
