= Vogue (song) =

1990 single by Madonna

Single by Madonna

from the album I'm Breathless
- B-side: "Keep It Together"
- Released: March 20, 1990
- Recorded: December 1989–January 1990
- Genre: House
- Length: 4:49 (album version); 4:21 (single version); 5:19 (The Immaculate Collection version); 8:25 (12-inch version)
- Label: Sire; Warner Bros.
- Songwriters: Madonna; Shep Pettibone
- Producers: Madonna; Shep Pettibone

Madonna singles chronology
"Keep It Together" (1990)	"Vogue" (1990)	"Hanky Panky" (1990)

Music video
- "Vogue" on YouTube

"Vogue" is a song by American singer Madonna from her soundtrack album I'm Breathless (1990). Written and produced by herself and Shep Pettibone, it was inspired by voguing, a dance popularized in New York City in the late 1980s. The song was released as the lead single from the album on March 20, 1990, by Sire Records and Warner Bros. Records. "Vogue" is a house song with influences of disco; it contains escapist lyrics describing the dance floor as "a place where no boundaries exist". Its middle eight features Madonna name-dropping several actors from the Golden Age of Hollywood. "Vogue" was later included on three of Madonna's compilation albums: The Immaculate Collection (1990), Celebration (2009), and Finally Enough Love: 50 Number Ones (2022).

Upon its release, "Vogue" received positive reviews from music critics, who noted how it was musically different from the rest of the tracks on I'm Breathless; it was retrospectively seen as one of Madonna's career highlights. The song was commercially successful, topping the charts in a number of countries, including Australia, Canada, Japan, the United Kingdom, and the United States, where it was certified triple platinum by the Recording Industry Association of America (RIAA). "Vogue" became Madonna's biggest selling single at the time of its release, and has sold more than six million copies worldwide to date. It additionally received prizes at the 1991 Juno Awards and at the American Music Awards of 1991.

The accompanying black-and-white music video, directed by David Fincher, was shot within 16 hours, while she was rehearsing for her Blond Ambition World Tour. It leans on static iconography, including shots inspired by works by painter Tamara de Lempicka and several Hollywood photographers. The video has been retrospectively regarded by critics as one of Madonna's best. It received a total of nine nominations at the 1990 MTV Video Music Awards, including for Video of the Year. Madonna has performed the song on several of her concert tours – the most recent being the 2023–2024 Celebration Tour – and other occasions, such as the Super Bowl XLVI halftime show.

"Vogue" has been covered and sampled by several artists since its release, including Kylie Minogue, Beth Ditto, Beyoncé, Rihanna, and Ariana Grande. It was also featured on the soundtrack of The Devil Wears Prada (2006), as well as in "The Power of Madonna" episode of the Fox show Glee in 2010. Writers and critics have noted the video and the song's influence in bringing an underground subculture into mainstream popular culture, as well as the way in which it followed a new trend in which house music enjoyed widespread popularity. Several publications have ranked "Vogue" among the greatest dance songs of all time.

== Background and release ==
By the end of the 1980s, Madonna had achieved a record-breaking 16 consecutive top-five singles on the US Billboard Hot 100 chart, more than any other act in history. However, her single "Oh Father" broke the string as it reached number 20, becoming her first single to miss the top 10 since 1984. The singer and her record company Warner Bros. decided to create a new song to be placed as the B-side of her next release "Keep It Together" to ensure that it would fare better on the charts. The label's head of dance music, Craig Kostich, approached producer Shep Pettibone to record a new track, as he had remixed some of her singles previously. Pettibone wrote and recorded the basic music for the song with a budget of US$5,000, and then sent it to Madonna for her to write the lyrics. She flew to New York City two weeks later to record her vocals in a vocal booth in a 24-track basement studio at West 56th Street, in a booth that had been converted from a closet, writing most of the lyrics on the plane. According to Pettibone, Madonna was efficient in the studio, rapidly tracking all the verse and chorus vocals in order, in single takes. He proposed the idea of a rap to fill the middle eight, and suggested name-dropping classic film stars, so they quickly wrote a list of names and she recorded it immediately.

Around the same time, Madonna saw dancers voguing at The Sound Factory. This type of dance was combined with pantomime and modeling poses by the flamboyant dances of Las Vegas showgirls. Inspired by the dance, she decided to call the song "Vogue", which surprised Pettibone, as the dance was already "semi-passé" at that point in the underground scene. He changed certain things about the music to fit what she sang, adding piano and changing the bass lines in the verse to make them flow better, although Madonna did not want him to alter the production, as she already liked it the way it was. After presenting "Vogue" to Warner Bros. executives three weeks after Kostich's approach, all parties involved decided that the song was too good to be put on a B-side and should be released as a single. "The record company went bananas, her manager went bananas. Everybody said. This is a major hit smash record — we're not going to lose it as a B-side on 'Keep It Together'", Pettibone recalled.

"Vogue" was included on the album soundtrack I'm Breathless, which contained songs from and inspired by the film Dick Tracy, in which Madonna starred as Breathless Mahoney. The singer had been approached by director and co-star Warren Beatty to write a song that would fit her character's point of view, as she was "obsessed with speakeasies and movie stars and things like that", and the idea served as an inspiration for "Vogue". Madonna later altered some of the suggestive lyrics because the song was connected to Disney via the soundtrack. Although it was part of the album, the track was not featured on the film. "Vogue" was released as the lead single from I'm Breathless in Europe and Oceania on March 20, 1990; in the United States, it was set to be released on March 29, but as WQHT started playing the track two days ahead of its release, "Vogue" was serviced to most radio stations on the next day. In Japan, the song was commercially issued on April 25. Afterwards, the track was included on Madonna's compilation albums The Immaculate Collection (1990), Celebration (2009), and in a remixed form on Finally Enough Love: 50 Number Ones (2022).

== Recording and composition ==
"Vogue"
A 27-second sample of "Vogue", a house song with influences of disco, featuring strings and a "punchy" syncopated piano on the chorus.

"Vogue" was written and produced by Madonna alongside Pettibone and recorded in New York City. Keyboards, bass, and programming were by Fred McFarlane, while drums and additional programming were by Alan Friedman. Pettibone also handled mixing for the track at Can Am Recording studios in Tarzana, California. Greg Kostich was its executive producer. The song was edited by Tony Shimkin. Goh Hotoda was cast as the mix engineer for the track, with engineering assistance by Curt Frasca. Madonna's backup vocalists Niki Haris and Donna De Lory, in addition to N'Dea Davenport, provided background vocals to the song. "Vogue" was mastered by Stephen Marcussen at Precision Lacquer in Hollywood, along with all tracks present on I'm Breathless.

"Vogue" is a house song with influences of disco. Reviewers also noted a "deep house groove", as well as a "throbbing beat" within its composition. Author J. Randy Taraborrelli wrote in his book Madonna: An Intimate Biography that the song was a "knockout pulsating track". According to author Jason Hanley, by listening to the arrangement musical form of the track, it is clear how "it was purposefully constructed for the dance floor", as the first verse does not start until a minute and a half into the song. It starts with synthesized string sounds, and then begins to build slowly with the addition of finger snaps, a pitched drum sound, and a deep pulsing bass. High strings persist throughout, and it has a "punchy" syncopated piano on the chorus. Set in the key of A♭ minor, it is set in common time with a moderately dance groove tempo of 116 beats per minute. Madonna's vocals span from C_{4} to E♭_{5}.

The song opens with Madonna asking, "What are you looking at" as "a way to establish the visual nature of the song lyrics". The escapist lyrics of "Vogue" allude to how important a "silly dance-floor ritual can be to its practitioners". On Encyclopedia Madonnica, author Matthew Rettenmund stated that the lyrics "baptize the dance floor as a place where no boundaries exist"; he described a dance floor as a place where "rebirth is possible, where a new life based on gesticulation can replace motionless and emotionless reality and anyone can become if only for the duration of a song – or of one's stamina – a 'superstar'"; it is further evidenced by the lyrics "It makes no difference if you're black or white, if you're a boy or a girl". Peter Robinson of Pitchfork viewed Madonna's belief in the dance floor as a "sacred space", as she sings: "When all else fails and you long to be something better than you are today, I know a place where you can get away – it's called a dance floor." According to NME's Nick Levine, the phrase became "essentially a mantra for her entire career". In the middle eight, Madonna performs a rap name-dropping several actors from the Golden Age of Hollywood, stressing her affection for movie stars:

Greta Garbo and Monroe
Dietrich and DiMaggio
Marlon Brando, Jimmy Dean
On the cover of a magazine

In 2012, Madonna and Pettibone were sued by VMG Salsoul based on the accusation that they had sampled a 0.23-second segment of horns from the song "Love Break" by the Salsoul Orchestra without permission. According to the plaintiff, portions of the song "are numerous but intentionally hidden" without permission by Pettibone, who they hired to mix "Love Break" before working on "Vogue"; they also claimed it took more modern technology to discover the alleged sample: "The unauthorized sampling was deliberately hidden by [Madonna] within 'Vogue' so as to avoid detection [...] It was only when VMG specifically looked for the sample, with the technology available to it in 2011, that the sampling could be confirmed", they continued. It was also claimed that VMG attempted to give notice of copyright infringement previously in July 2011 and again in February 2012. Pettibone's defense was that he recreated the horn sound, rather than sampling it. The case was decided in Madonna and Pettibone's favor; the judge found that "no reasonable audience" would be able to discern the sampled portions, as they were insignificant to "Vogue". That decision was affirmed by the Ninth Circuit Court of Appeals.

== Critical response ==
"Vogue" received acclaim from music critics. According to Newsday's Karen DeSantis, it was excellent and the best song on I'm Breathless, adding that "the song has her old-time style that will make a lot of kids buy this CD". Barry Walters of The San Francisco Examiner found the track "seductive" and "audacious", and stated that Madonna would "stay in vogue for a long, long time." Bill Coleman from Billboard magazine commented that "the starlet's pop/house homage to the underground (soon to be pushed very overground) fad pulls off its aims." He stated that it "maintains the flavor of Pettibone's past 'house' treatments with a bit of his classic 'Love Break' tossed in for good déjà vu measure." Ernest Hardy, a writer for Cash Box, also noted influences of "Love Break" and opined that Madonna's "pop savvy takes well to a house setting", adding that "based on the instant acceptance by radio and clubs, it's gonna be a Madonna Summer". Select's Andrew Harrison considered it a "crushing house" song, while for Adam Sweeting of The Guardian, the album is "topped and talled with its best tracks", respectively "He's a Man" and "Vogue".

According to Edith Lee from Journal and Courier, "Vogue", along with "Something to Remember", were the only tracks which did not fit into the "vintage mold" of I'm Breathless. Jon Pareles of The New York Times opined that the song was "the odd song out" and "the song that shows what's missing from the rest of the album"; he stated that anyone who bought I'm Breathless expecting other similar songs would feel like "the victim of a bait-and-switch maneuver." Writing another review for the same publication, Michael MacCambridge stated that although "Vogue" was "terrific", it sounded like "a blatantly commercial appendage" to promote the soundtrack, and felt that it was not a representative single of the record. For his part, Deseret News' Ray Boren felt that the track was an "interloper, stylistically speaking" on the album. On another note, Greg Sandow from Entertainment Weekly felt that "Vogue" "improbably sounds like a genuine culmination" and that it "somehow fits in". David Giles of Music Week stated that "it possesses a meatier groove than we've been used to", but felt that the "silly" rap section "reduces her to the level of the Beloved."

While offering a negative review of the album, Tony Parsons of The Daily Telegraph pointed out that "only 'Vogue', the recent numero uno knocked out as a bait to part of the tinies from their pocket money, passes for something like a Madonna record." Similarly, Chriss Willman of Los Angeles Times said "Vogue" was "the one traditional Madonna single" on I'm Breathless. According to the Orlando Sentinel's Parry Gettelman, "Vogue" served as the "spoonful of sugar to make the rest of this stuff go down" while reviewing the album as a whole. Ronni Lundy of The Courier-Journal commented that although it had no reason to be on I'm Breathless, the track would "make this piece of fluff a multimillion seller", wondering "how many of the pop-Madonna's fans will actually play it more than twice after they get 'I'm Breathless' home and find out that 'Vogue' is the only typical Madonna song on it." Mark Coleman of Rolling Stone wrote that while the song initially sounded "lackluster", within the album's context, it "gains a startling resonance". Offering a more negative review, Dan Bennett from North County Blade-Citizen commented that "at first distant, this spoken dance tune grows on you, but not that much."

Retrospective reviews have also been positive. Taraborrelli wrote that the rap section of the song was "still one of Madonna's greatest camp musical moments". AllMusic senior editor Stephen Thomas Erlewine said that the track was "Madonna's finest single moment" and that it had an "instantly memorable melody". In a review for The Immaculate Collection, Erlewine also stated that the song was "sleek" and "stylish". Jose F. Promis, in another review for the same publication, pointed out that "Vogue" was a "crowning artistic achievement". Kevork Djansezian of Tulsa World called it a "wonderful dance tune". In 1998, Danny Eccleston from Q stated that I'm Breathless could barely describe the "shoe-horned" and "still-preposterous" song; In a retrospective review for I'm Breathless, Tony Power from Blender called the song "fabulous", and "entirely incongruous". Sal Cinquemani of Slant Magazine, also reviewing the album as a whole, claimed that while the "hugely influential" song initially sounded "grossly out of place", it turns out to be "a fitting finale" for I'm Breathless. According to Peter Robinson from Pitchfork, listeners would find the song's lyrics "as inspiring in 2017 as listeners almost three decades ago did".

=== Accolades ===
"Vogue" won the "Best Selling International Single" category at the 1991 Juno Awards, as well as the "Favorite Dance Single" prize at the American Music Awards of 1991, while also being nominated for "Favorite Pop/Rock Single". The single also received a ASCAP Pop Music Award for "Most Performed Song", and won the prize for "Best Disco Single" at the SER FM Awards. Based on the 1990 Rolling Stone Reader's Poll Awards, "Vogue" was considered the best single of the year. The song was also ranked as the fourth best song of 1990 on that year's Pazz & Jop poll by The Village Voice.

In June 2020, Slant Magazine, ranked it number two in their list of "The 100 Best Dance Songs of All Time". In July 2022, Rolling Stone ranked it number 11 in their list of "200 Greatest Dance Songs of All Time". In 2025, Billboard magazine ranked "Vogue" numbers 23 and seven in their lists of "The 100 Best Dance Songs of All Time" and "The 100 Greatest LGBTQ+ Anthems of All Time".

== Commercial performance ==
In the United States, "Vogue" debuted at number 39 on the Billboard Hot 100 on the issue dated April 14, 1990, and reached the top of the chart a month later, replacing Sinéad O'Connor's "Nothing Compares 2 U". It matched "Like a Virgin" (1984) and "Like a Prayer" (1989) as the fastest-rising single of her career on the chart. "Vogue" also topped the Dance Club Play chart and reached number 16 on the Hot Black Singles component charts. "Vogue" was ranked at number five on the Hot 100 year-end chart of 1990, and was certified double platinum by the Recording Industry Association of America (RIAA) in June 1990, for shipments of two million copies of the single. Billboard ranked it at number five on their list of "Madonna's 40 Biggest Hits" on the Hot 100. In addition, it has also sold 311,000 digital downloads as of April 2010 according to Nielsen SoundScan. In Canada, the song debuted at number 71 on the week of April 14, 1990, on the RPM 100 Singles chart, and reached the top after nine weeks. It was certified platinum by Music Canada (MC) in August 1990 for shipments of 100,000 copies in the region.

In Australia, "Vogue" debuted on the ARIA Singles Chart at number 19 on April 29, 1990. One week later, it reached the top of the chart, and stayed there for another four weeks. It was present for a total of 21 weeks on the chart, and was later certified double platinum by the Australian Recording Industry Association (ARIA) in 1990 for shipments of 70,000 copies of the single. On the year-end ARIA charts, "Vogue" was the third top-selling Australian single of 1990. In New Zealand, "Vogue" debuted at number 15 on the singles chart on the week of May 6, 1990, and reached number one after three weeks. It was present for a total of 22 weeks on the chart.

In the United Kingdom, "Vogue" entered the UK Singles Chart at number four before moving to the top the next week, remaining there for four weeks and spending a total of 14 weeks on the chart. The British Phonographic Industry (BPI) certified it gold in May 1990 for shipments of 400,000 copies of the single. According to the Official Charts Company, the song has sold 663,000 copies as of April 2019. In addition, "Vogue" also reached number one in a number of countries such as Finland, Italy, Norway, and Spain. Its commercial performance in European countries helped the song reach the summit of the Eurochart Hot 100 Singles chart, on the issue dated April 21, 1990. In total, "Vogue" reached number one in over 30 countries worldwide, thus becoming Madonna's biggest success at that time. As of August 1990, it was the best-selling single of 1990 with sales of more than two million copies, and has sold more than six million units worldwide to date. In addition, "Vogue" became the highest-selling single on WEA at the time, surpassing Chic's "Le Freak" (1978).

== Music video ==
=== Background and development ===
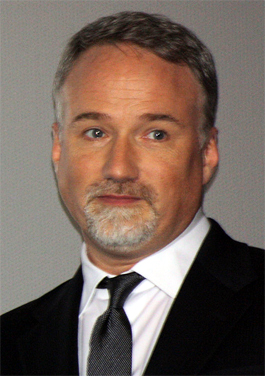
David Fincher, who had previously directed two of Madonna's music videos, was appointed as the director for "Vogue"

The accompanying music video for "Vogue" was directed by David Fincher, who had previously directed Madonna's videos for "Express Yourself" and "Oh Father" (both 1989). The video was filmed on February 10–11, 1990 at Burbank Studios in Burbank, California. It was produced by Vicki Niles, under Propaganda Films, with editing by Jim Haygood, and cinematography by Pascal Lebegue. Fincher recalled that he convinced Madonna to release a video for "Oh Father", but although he was happy with the result, the single's performance on the charts did not meet her label's expectations. She was pressured by the company to rush with a video for "Vogue", and returned to him to direct the video. The visual was filmed in a total of 16 hours, as she was rehearsing for her Blond Ambition World Tour and had restricted time to film the video.

Dancers Luis Camacho and Jose Gutierez, both members of the House of Xtravaganza, who were already famous in New York City's underground ballroom scene as voguing pioneers, were two of the first to audition for the singer at the Tracks nightclub in New York City. They received the chance to audition as their friend's boyfriend was friends with Madonna's make-up artist at the time, Debi Mazar. Gutierez recalled that when they danced for the singer, "the whole club turned into an audition", as the crowd followed their dance moves. Their impromptu audition impressed Madonna enough to invite them to official auditions, and the opportunity to choreograph the video. The official auditions took place after a rushed casting call in Los Angeles, where hundreds of different sorts of dancers appeared and were whittled down within a few days, with Madonna also taking them out to clubs to make sure they "could deliver".

Given the absence of Fincher's typically extensive pre-production routine, the video leans on static imagery, including shots that recall compositions by Art Deco painter Tamara de Lempicka, as well as Hollywood portrait photographers, such as Don English, Eugene Robert Richee, George Hurrell, Whitey Schafer, Ernest Bachrach, Scotty Welbourne, László Willinger, Clarence Sinclair Bull, and Horst P. Horst. The latter was reportedly "displeased" with Madonna's video because he never gave his permission for his work to be used and received no acknowledgement from the singer or her team. Horst's manager declared, "You can't fault her taste. But the video should have been called 'Hommage to Horst'. We just wish we could have worked something out beforehand-like doing an original photograph of her in the nude", to which Madonna's spokeswoman responded that "she's a great admirer of Horst. We didn't mean to upset him". The music video premiered on MTV on March 29, 1990, billed as a "planetary premiere" by the network. MTV requested that Madonna remove the scenes in which her breasts are visible through a sheer lace blouse, but she refused to do so, and the scenes were aired unaltered.

=== Synopsis ===
A scene showing Madonna wearing a sheer lace blouse, which she refused to remove following MTV's request

The black-and-white video begins with a feather curtain covering the screen. As they are disclosed, several dancers are shown posing like statues amid Greek statues and paintings. Madonna begins singing the song as she turns around and strikes a pose, while dancers are marching fashionly, with others sitting on chairs. During the first verse, images of the singer wearing a sheer lace dress are intercalated with shots of her floating above a satin covered floor. As the first chorus begins, Madonna is seen wearing a tunic accompanied by three male dancers all dressed in black in front of a black background, executing a choreography performed only with their hands, standing still. In the second verse, the singer walks in front of a huge window, wearing a black long dress.

For the second chorus, three dancers perform another choreography, but unlike the first chorus, not standing still but moving in different corners of the frame; these scenes are intercalated with images of Madonna imitating Horst's "Lisa With Turban" and "Carmen Face Massage" pictures. The third chorus depicts the singer dancing with just one male dancer, before the rap that name-drops Hollywood actors. For the last chorus, all the dancers and two backup singers perform the song along with Madonna, who opens her blouse and dances showing her cone bra. The scenes are intercalated with several sequences where Madonna imitates Horst's "Mainbocher Corset" picture, which depict her dressed in a back-lacing corset. The video ends with a curtain of feathers being pulled over Madonna and her dancers.

=== Reception and analysis ===
Initial reaction towards the video was positive. Edna Gundersen from USA Today called the visual "camp, glamour, sensuality and dress-you-up finery" and found Madonna's look in the video similar to that of Marilyn Monroe. Harriet Swift of Oakland Tribune shared a similar opinion, writing that Madonna had "never looked more like Marilyn Monroe than in this film, with her white-blond hair no rebelliously declasse dark roots showing this time", and considered that the clip was "so much slicker and more stylized than any other Madonna video", noting its "stylish camera angles, extremely sophisticated film editing and freeze-frame body posing", looking as if it "could have been photographed by the late Robert Mapplethorpe with its cool, glamorous surfaces and penchant for classical motifs." Liz Smith, a journalist from New York Daily News, also compared Madonna in the video to Monroe, as well as Harlow and Dietrich, and noted that in contrast to her previous music videos, "this one won't outrage and cause controversy", as the singer was "dressed to the teeth" with "no religious imagery and no vulgarity" that "even an old-fashioned mother might love", she concluded. David Barton from McClathy News Service felt that the scene where Madonna appears wearing a see-through sheer lace dress was "a move certain to arouse controversy, a long established Madonna tactic", and wrote that the video "manages to position Madonna once again, at least in the eyes of the mainstream audience, as on the cutting edge of popular culture."

Retrospective commentary has also been positive. Writing for The Independent, Ben Kelly asserted that the video was Madonna's most iconic moment, as it "pays homage to the classic era of Hollywood but in turn its own imagery is now firmly embedded in pop culture history", and "from the famous dance routine to the appearance of that cone bra, it is laden with memorable moments". Parade's Samuel Murrian described the visual as "unforgettable" and "timeless", and commented about how it brought "an underground movement into the mainstream". Ranking it as Madonna's best video, Mike Nied of Idolator felt that it "would be a landmark release in any videography", and was "the definition of a timeless, enduring success". This opinion was shared by Louis Virtel, writing for The Backlot, who also declared it Madonna's best video, and called it "not only a pristine and elegant and ebulliently gay spectacle; it is the definitive Madonna statement. Madonna's charisma is wrapped up in theatrical arrogance and proud self-consciousness, and that's exactly what vogueing celebrates". Rocco Papa of The Odyssey hailed it was "a tribute to an important part of the gay subculture" and "an example of Madonna helping build representation for the LGBTQ community". For his part, Slant Magazine's Eric Henderson pointed out that for some, the video was "the ultimate democratization of beauty. To others, a presumptuously preemptive eradication of the racial question entirely", referring to the dance's origins.

Douglas Kellner, author of Media Culture: Cultural Studies, Identity, and Politics Between the Modern and the Postmodern, highlighted how "Vogue" was among Madonna's "most striking music videos" by being "highly aestheticized" and using "modernist techniques of the construction of compelling images". Kellner noted how the visual "deploys posed images to celebrate pure camp", while parodying fashion conventions, such as modeling, posing, photography, and objectification, but reinforcing them by identifying voguing with a gay dance phenomenon and then cultural celebrity. According to Lucy O'Brien on She Bop II: The Definitive History of Women in Rock, Pop and Soul, Madonna "picked up on the exaggerated catwalk-model poses of a gay underground craze and turned it into a glorious celebration of image – the power of old-style movie – magazine editorial transferred to video" with "Vogue". Pamela Robertson wrote on Guilty Pleasures: Feminist Camp from Mae West to Madonna that the video makes sex and gender roles "ambiguous enough that its affiliation, and Madonna's, with a gay subculture cannot be ignored or erased", using "gay subcultural references in conjunction with post-modern pastiche and retrocinephilia to create a queer camp effect". She also noted that Madonna served as a "female female impersonator" between the glamorous costumes and "mixed gender signs", such as the cone bra worn atop a man's suit. In Queer Tracks: Subversive Strategies in Rock and Pop Music, Doris Leibetseder commented that the video portrayed "a particular relationship between gay subculture, Hollywood stars and feminist camp", and noted queer scholar Judith Butler criticized how "Vogue" "diluted the homosexual political elements for the straight public", explaining that the "gay dance elements" were portrayed by "usual male and female types (e.g. the civil servant, the school girl)".

The video received a total of nine nominations at the 1990 MTV Video Music Awards, winning three technical categories, for Best Direction, Best Editing and Best Cinematography. In 1999, the video was voted number two on MTV's 100 Greatest Videos Ever Made, only behind Michael Jackson's Thriller. It was later ranked at number five on the Top 100 Videos That Broke The Rules, issued by MTV on the channel's 25th anniversary in August 2006. VH1 ranked "Vogue" sixth on their list of Best Music Videos of All Time. In a 2011 poll by Billboard, "Vogue" was voted the third best music video of the 1990s.

In 2019, it became Madonna's fourth music video to reach over 100 million views on YouTube across four different decades, following "Bitch I'm Madonna" (2015), "Hung Up" (2005) and "La Isla Bonita" (1987), making her the first female artist in history to achieve this feat within the streaming era.

== Live performances ==
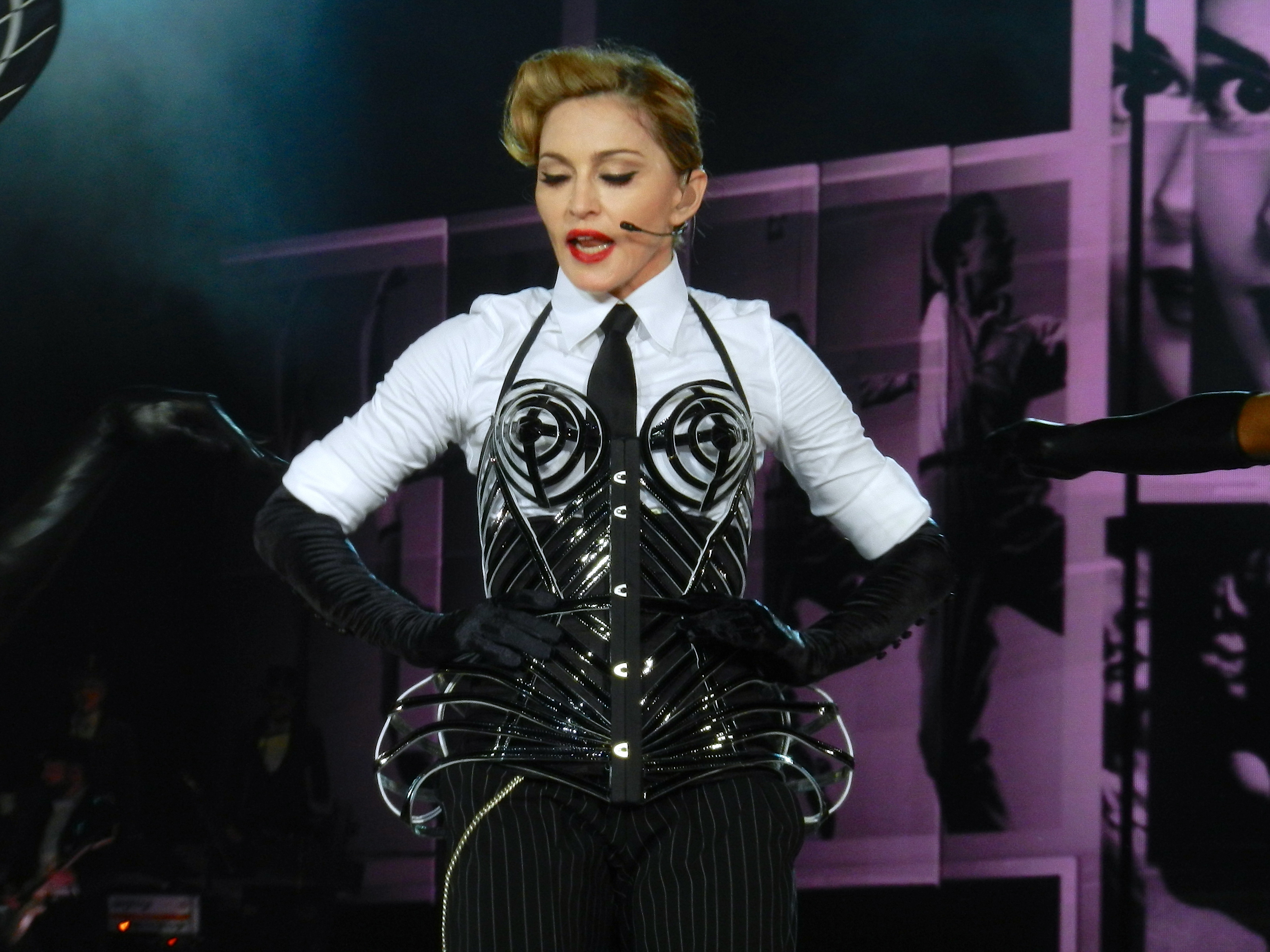
Madonna performing "Vogue" on the MDNA Tour (2012), donning a re-worked version of the Jean Paul Gaultier-designed conical corset.

"Vogue" has been performed on eight of Madonna's concert tours: Blond Ambition (1990), The Girlie Show (1993), Re-Invention (2004), Sticky & Sweet (2008–2009), MDNA (2012), Rebel Heart (2015–2016), Madame X (2019–2020), and Celebration (2023–2024). On the first one, Madonna wore a black sports cone bra with lycra shorts, while the dancers wore black spandex, with the backdrops depicting Tamara de Lempicka paintings. Slant Magazine felt that the performance was "stripped down to the bare basics" and "came closest to capturing the essence of the gay ballroom scene the lyrics were inspired by: presentational, preening, and all about the pose". Two performances were taped and released on video, the Blond Ambition – Japan Tour 90, taped in Yokohama, Japan, on April 27, 1990, and the Live! – Blond Ambition World Tour 90, taped in Nice, France, on August 5, 1990. One of the performances was also one of the performances included in the documentary, Madonna: Truth or Dare (1990). The song was later performed at the 1990 MTV Video Music Awards, where Madonna and her dancers were clad in 18th century-inspired fashions, inspired by Marie Antoinette, with sexual innuendo in the performance. At one point the singer flipped open her large skirt, allowing one of her dancers to crawl inside and come out through the other side. Taraborrelli observed that it was a "classic, camp show that elevated the standards of future performances on that program". It was later ranked by Rolling Stone as the sixth best performance in the history of the award show. A similar performance was made at the AIDS Project Los Angeles benefit later that year.

Three years later, Madonna included "Vogue" on The Girlie Show tour, where it was given a Thai-themed performance. She wore an ensemble consisting of black sequined hot pants and a bra paired with knee-high military boots and a large beaded headdress that was described by her tour director and brother Christopher Ciccone as "part Erté, part Zizi Jeanmaire". Santiago Fouz-Hernández and Freya Jarman-Ivens criticized the singer for placing "her signature over-exaggeration and deformation in an Asian worldview and Hinduism". The performance on the November 19, 1993, show at Sydney Cricket Ground was recorded and included on the video release The Girlie Show: Live Down Under. In 2004, Madonna opened the Re-Invention tour with a performance of the song in a Marie Antoinette-themed setting. She arrived on stage atop a rising platform dressed in a jewel encrusted corset. Madonna struck yoga poses and at one point, supported herself on her forearms. Sal Cinquemani from Slant Magazine commented that the performance gave new meaning to the slogan "strike a pose". The number was included in the I'm Going to Tell You a Secret live album and documentary. A mashup of "Vogue", Madonna's own "4 Minutes", and Timbaland's "Give It to Me", was performed on the Sticky & Sweet tour in 2008 and 2009. Madonna was dressed in a black leotard and fishnet tights while the dancers wore bondage-inspired gear; together they did a synchronized choreography to the song. It received generally mixed reviews from critics. The performance was included on the Sticky & Sweet Tour live CD and DVD release, recorded in Buenos Aires, Argentina.

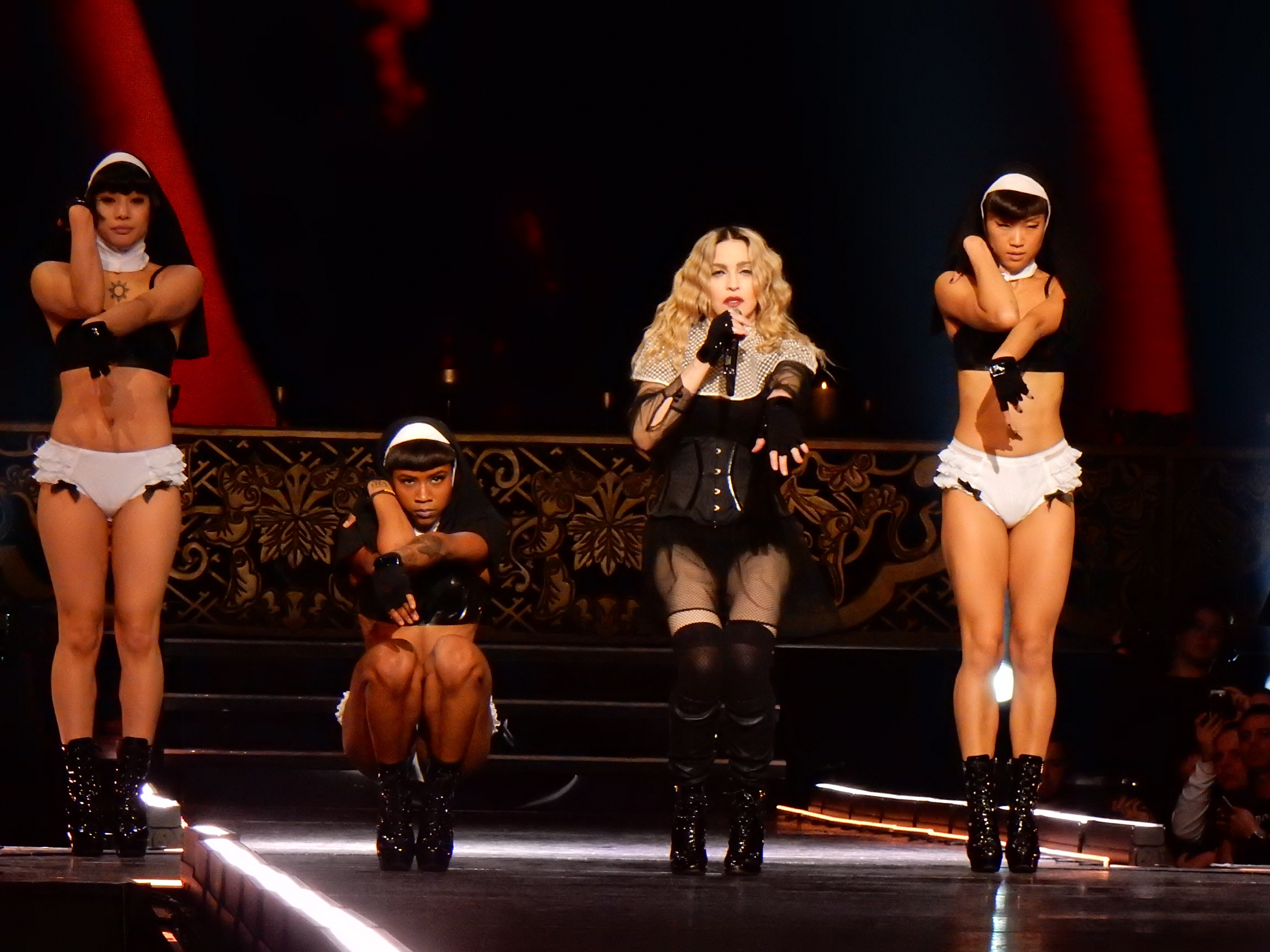
The Rebel Heart Tour's mashup performance of "Holy Water" and "Vogue".

In 2012, Madonna opened the Super Bowl XLVI halftime show with a performance of "Vogue". It began as a procession to the stage, with men dressed as gladiators pulling a large structure hidden from view by large gold-colored flags. As "Vogue" began the flags were removed, revealing Madonna in a long, gold-colored cape and an ancient-Egyptian headdress seated on a large throne. Slant Magazine praised the singer for "opening her performance at the Super Bowl, arguably the most heterosexual audience she's ever appeared in front of, with perhaps the gayest anthem in her catalogue". Ten of the stars mentioned in the song were entitled to a royalty payment of US$3,750 as their images were also used in the performance. For the performance of the track on the MDNA tour which occurred the same year, Madonna wore an ensemble consisting of a suit and a cage corset with conical bra cups, while the dancers were dressed in black and white avant-garde outfits. The singer's outfit was designed by Jean Paul Gaultier, who described it as "a nod to the conical bra corset of the Blond Ambition tour but reinterpreted in 3-D". Chandeliers were hung on the background while the screens flashed the song's title and black and white 1950s fashion imagery. Nisha Gopalan from The Hollywood Reporter said that thanks to being a "purist rendition" the song ended up as a "true crowd-pleaser that elicited as many squeals as it did goosebumps". A performance of the song at a show in Miami at the American Airlines Arena was recorded and released on the live album MDNA World Tour.

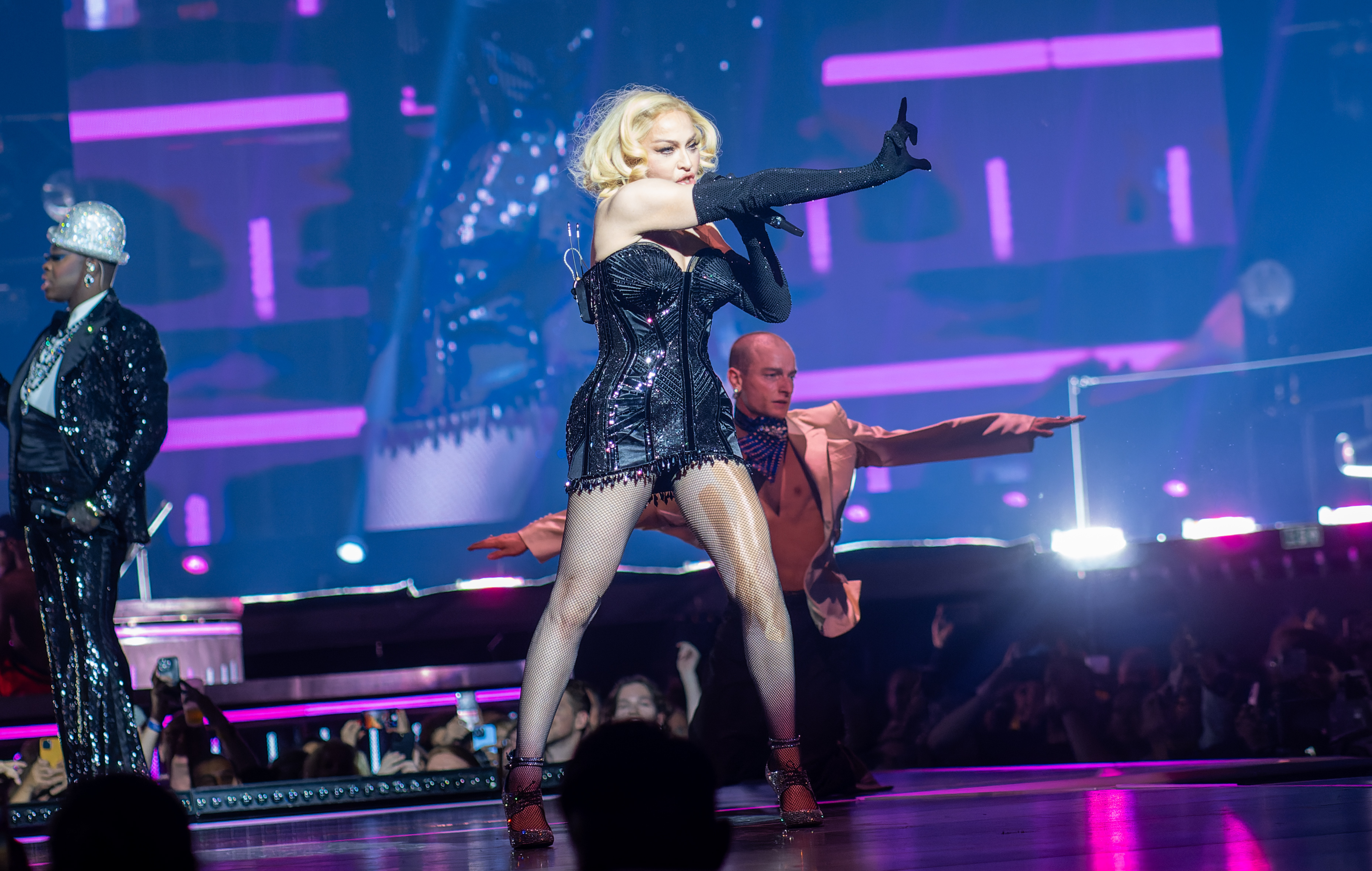
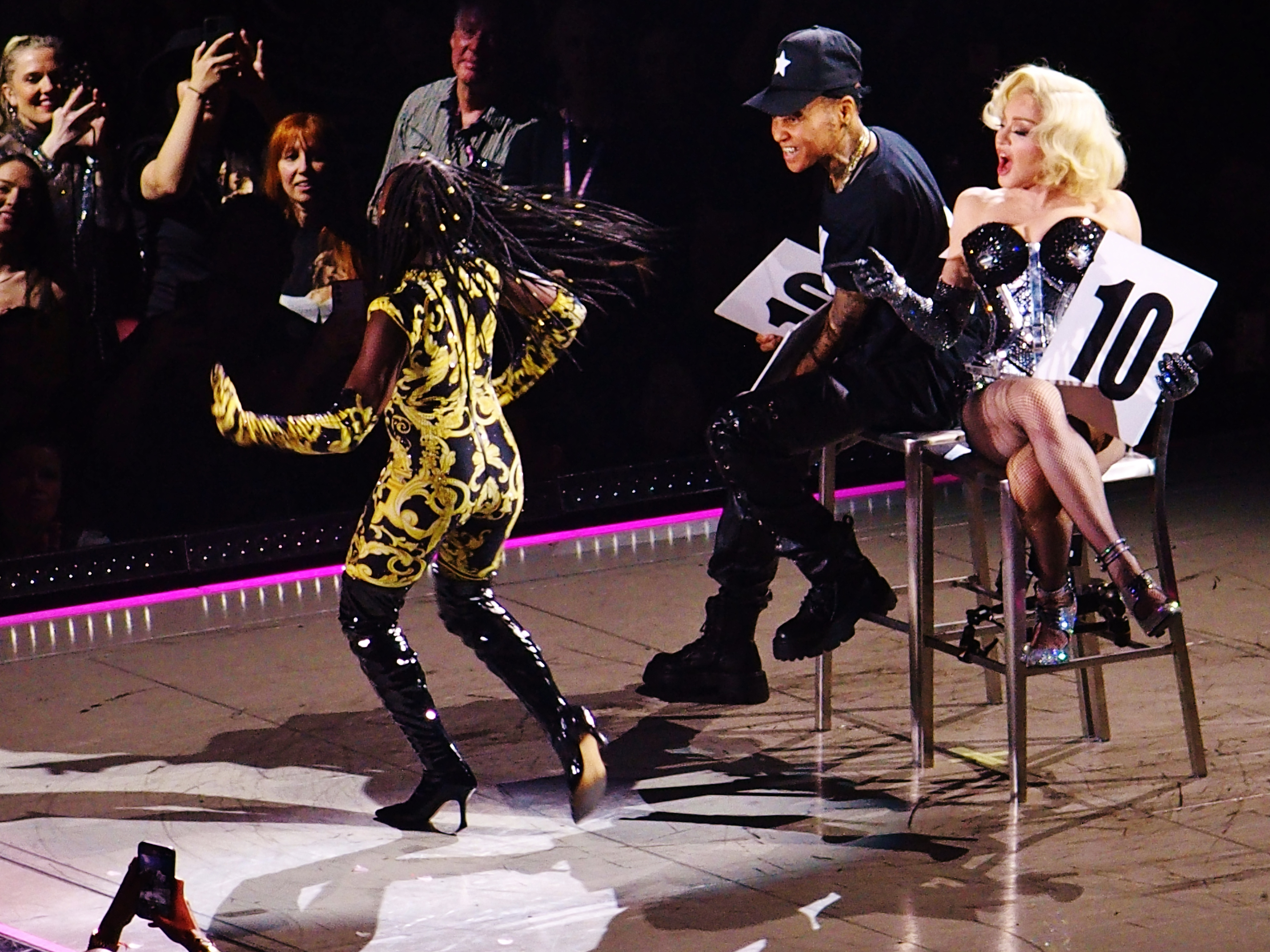
Madonna singing "Vogue" on the Celebration Tour (2023–2024). The number featured a ballroom competition (bottom), in which the singer and a guest would judge and rate the dancers.

On the 2015–2016 Rebel Heart Tour, Madonna performed a mashup of "Vogue" and "Holy Water", a song from her 13th studio album Rebel Heart (2015). Towards the end of the performance of "Holy Water", she began singing "Vogue"'s rap and chorus while writhing against a dancer dressed as a nun in hot pants, bikini tops and high-heeled boots while other dancers simulated an orgy at the Last Supper. The Sydney Morning Herald's Michael Lallo pointed out that "Vogue" had never been "performed with such darkness" compared to its usual treatment as "a slick dance number". The performances at Sydney's Allphones Arena were recorded and released on the Rebel Heart Tour live album. On December 6, 2016, Madonna sang "Vogue" during the Carpool Karaoke segment of The Late Late Show with James Corden. On June 30, 2019, Madonna used the track as the opening song of her mini concert at the Stonewall 50 – WorldPride NYC 2019, to commemorate the 50th anniversary of the Stonewall riots. She entered the stage in a black trench coat amid a troupe of identically dressed dancers. A similar performance was later done for the Madame X Tour in 2019 and 2020, which was chronicled on the tour's documentary film released in 2021.

On June 24, 2021, the singer made a surprise appearance at an LGBT pride party at the Boom Boom Room of New York's The Standard hotel, and "Vogue" was used as the opening song. The song was again performed by Madonna on the 2023–2024 Celebration Tour, with elements of Beyoncé's "Break My Soul (The Queens Remix)". The stage was transformed into a ballroom competition, which was described by Billboard's Joe Lynch as "a multi-layered tribute to her past, her family and her queer inspirations". She serves as a judge of a parade of dancers, which includes her daughter Estere; during the course of the tour, a number of invited judges also appear, including Gaultier, FKA twigs, Julia Fox, and her daughter Lourdes Leon. During the performance Madonna wears a new version of the conic bra, consisting of a black cone mini dress, encrusted with black crystals, designed by Gaultier. On April 18, 2026, Madonna performed a section of the song on the main stage at Coachella 2026 with American-singer Sabrina Carpenter.

== Cover versions and usage ==
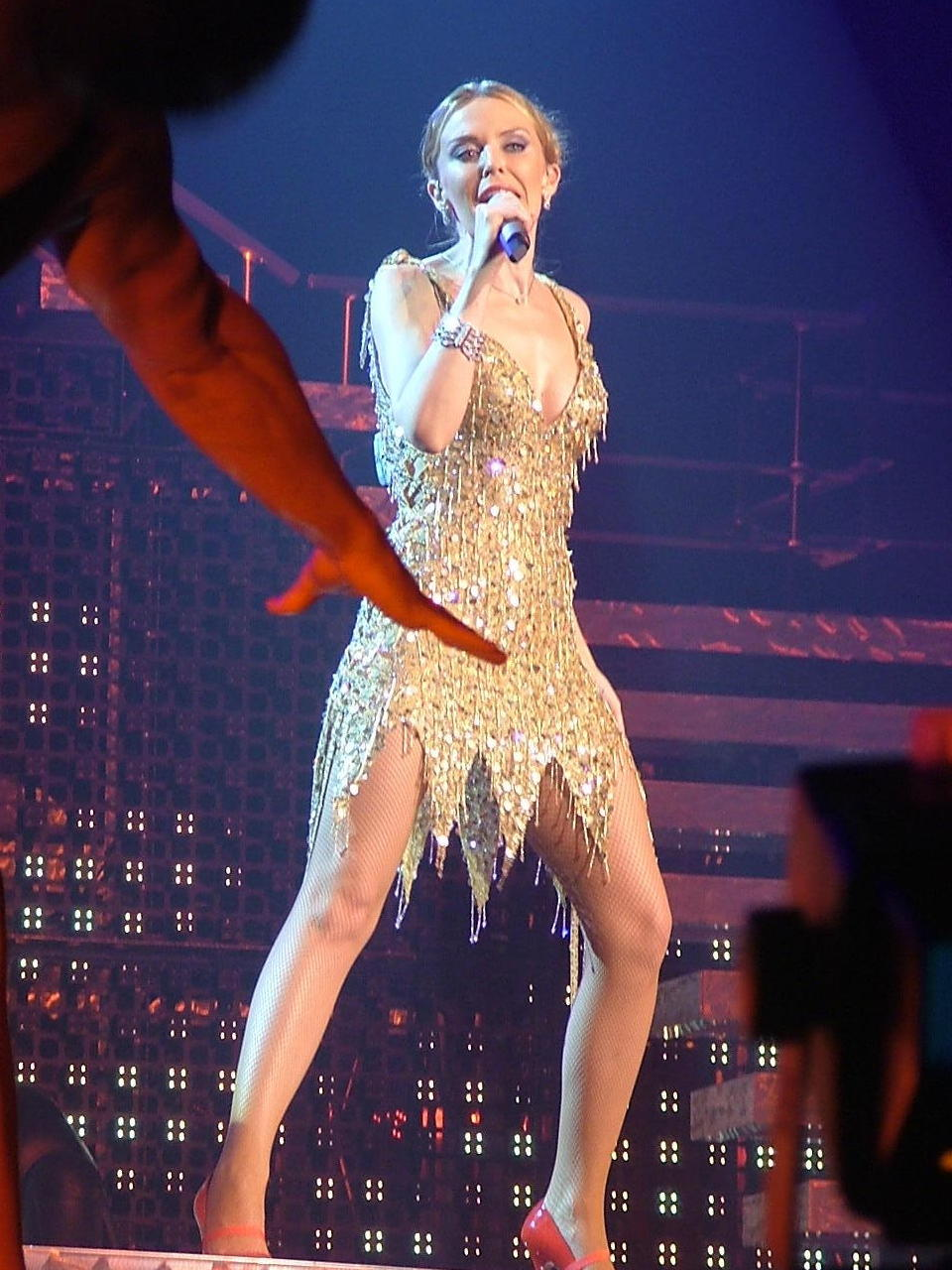
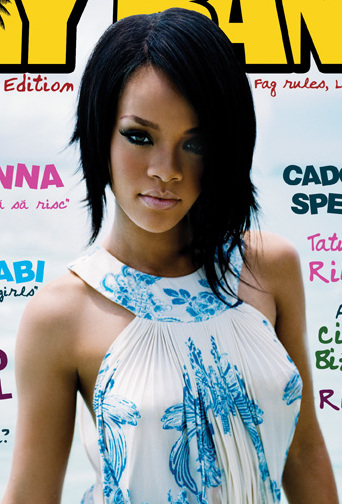
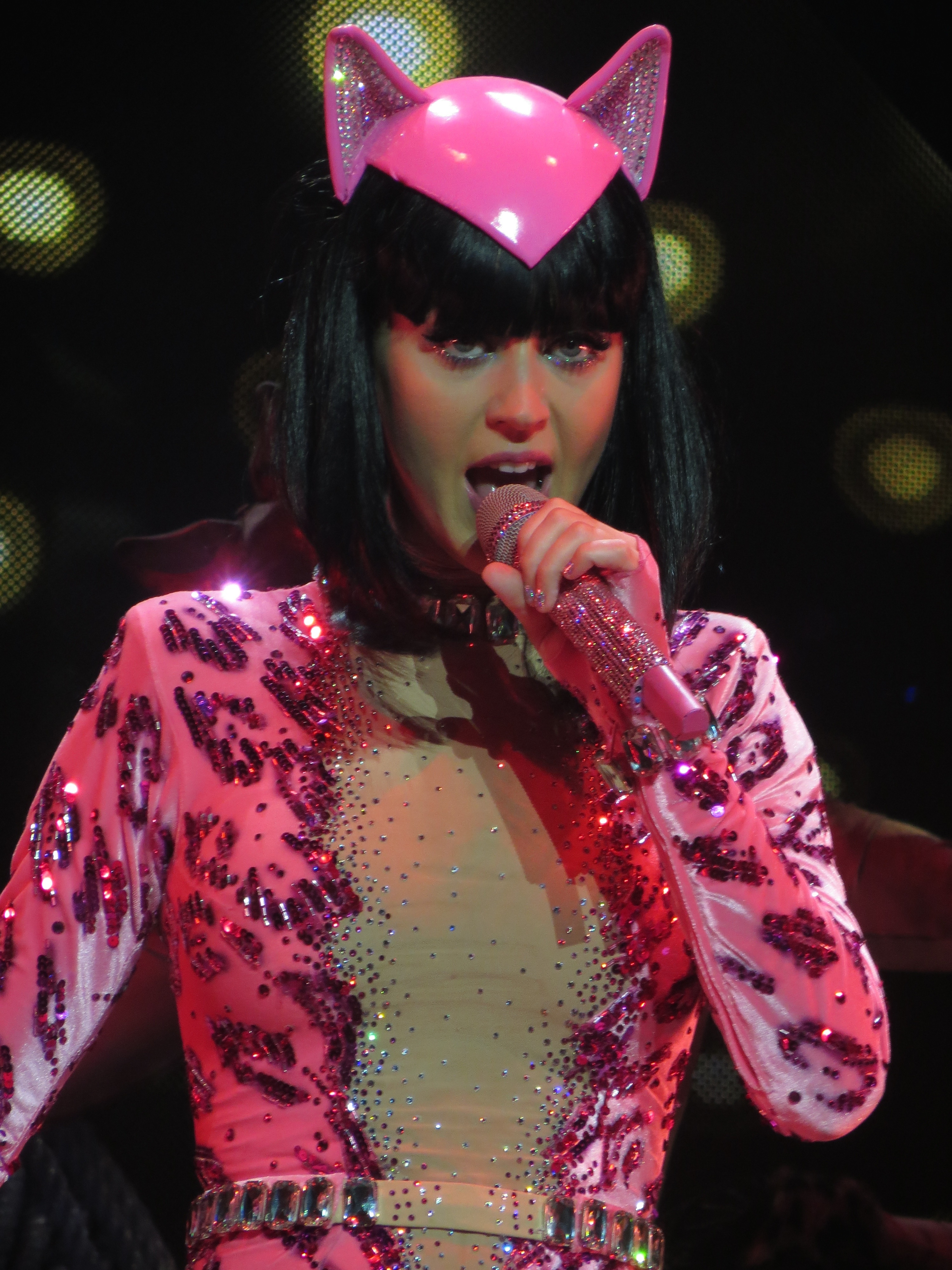
"Vogue" has been covered by artists like Kylie Minogue (left), Rihanna (center), and Katy Perry (right).

In 1991, comedian Julie Brown sang a parody of "Vogue" titled "Vague" in the TV special Medusa: Dare to Be Truthful, itself a spoof of Madonna and her documentary Madonna: Truth or Dare. In 1992, Finnish band Waltari released a cover of the song on their album Torcha!. The Chipettes also covered it on their 1996 album Club Chipmunk: The Dance Mixes. The 1999 compilation album Virgin Voices: A Tribute To Madonna, Vol. 1 features a cover version by British electronic music group Astralasia. The same year, Britney Spears included the song on the setlist for her ...Baby One More Time Tour along with Madonna's single "Material Girl" (1984). A dance version of "Vogue" by Mad'House can be found on their album Absolutely Mad, released in 2002. The song is featured in the 2006 film The Devil Wears Prada as a nod to Miranda Priestly's inspiration, Vogue editor Anna Wintour, and it was used again in the 2026 sequel. In 2006 and 2007, Australian singer Kylie Minogue performed it in her tour Showgirl: The Homecoming Tour, with her song "Burning Up" from her eighth studio album Fever (2001) as the background music. She repeated this performance during the 2009 For You, For Me Tour. Rihanna recorded a later leaked cover of "Vogue" before performing the song during the 2008 Fashion Rocks. In 2013, "Vogue" inspired flash mobs around the United States.

In 2010, on the TV show Glee, Sue Sylvester performed a parody of the "Vogue" music video on an episode titled "The Power of Madonna", with the name of Ginger Rogers replaced by the name of Sue Sylvester, and the phrase "Bette Davis we love you" replaced by the phrase "Will Schuester I hate you". Following the episode, the song charted at number 106 on the UK Singles Chart. Beth Ditto has covered "Vogue" on occasion, including at Moscow Miller Party in 2011. She also paid homage to "Vogue" with the video of her single "I Wrote the Book" (2011). In 2014 and 2015, Katy Perry used a snippet of "Vogue" in a mashup with her own song "International Smile", during the Prismatic World Tour. Ariana Grande performed a medley of "Vogue" and Whitney Houston's "I'm Every Woman" at New York City Pride's Dance on the Pier in 2015. In 2021, South Korean singer Luna's song "Madonna" referenced "Vogue" in its lyrics, "When I grow up, I wanna be like Madonna / When I grow up, I wanna vogue how I wanna".

In 2022, Beyoncé teamed up with Madonna for "The Queens" remix of her single, "Break My Soul". This version heavily interpolates "Vogue" and has Beyonce paying homage to Madonna, her sister Solange Knowles, and her Destiny's Child bandmates Kelly Rowland and Michelle Williams, along with prominent black women in music, and ballroom houses such as House of Xtravaganza, House of Aviance and House of LaBeija as a celebration of empowerment. Beyoncé later thanked Madonna for allowing her to use the song, and revealed that Madonna was the one that named the remix. It was later added to the setlist of the Renaissance World Tour in 2023, with Beyoncé shouting out Madonna who was in attendance at the East Rutherford, New Jersey stop. That same year, Puerto Rican singer and rapper Bad Bunny sampled "Vogue" on the track "Vou 787", included on his sixth studio album Nadie Sabe Lo Que Va a Pasar Mañana. During the song, he sings that if he was a woman, he would have been like Madonna or Rihanna.

== Legacy ==
"Vogue" was included on the Rock and Roll Hall of Fame's "500 Songs That Shaped Rock and Roll" list, and was voted number five on VH1's "100 Greatest Songs of the 90s". Pitchfork editors ranked "Vogue" as the 115th best song of the 1990s, praising it for how unapologetically it celebrated queer life at the height of the AIDS epidemic. Rolling Stone listed the track as one of the "500 Best Songs of All Time" at number 139, while they named it the 11th greatest dance song of all time. The song was placed by Billboard on the number four spot on its list of "60 Top LGBTQ Anthems of All Time", and as part of the 65th anniversary of the Billboard Hot 100, the magazine's staff ranked "Vogue" as the 186th best pop song that appeared on the chart. Slant Magazine ranked it at number 10 on their "Best Singles of the '90s" list, and number three in the list of the 100 Greatest Dance Songs. Music critic Jody Rosen from Slate included "Vogue" as one of Madonna's "ten essential songs for new or aspiring fans". Time called it "the most famous fashion song of all time", although the song was not specifically about the magazine Vogue. It was named the most iconic female dance moment in history in a list published by The Daily Telegraph.

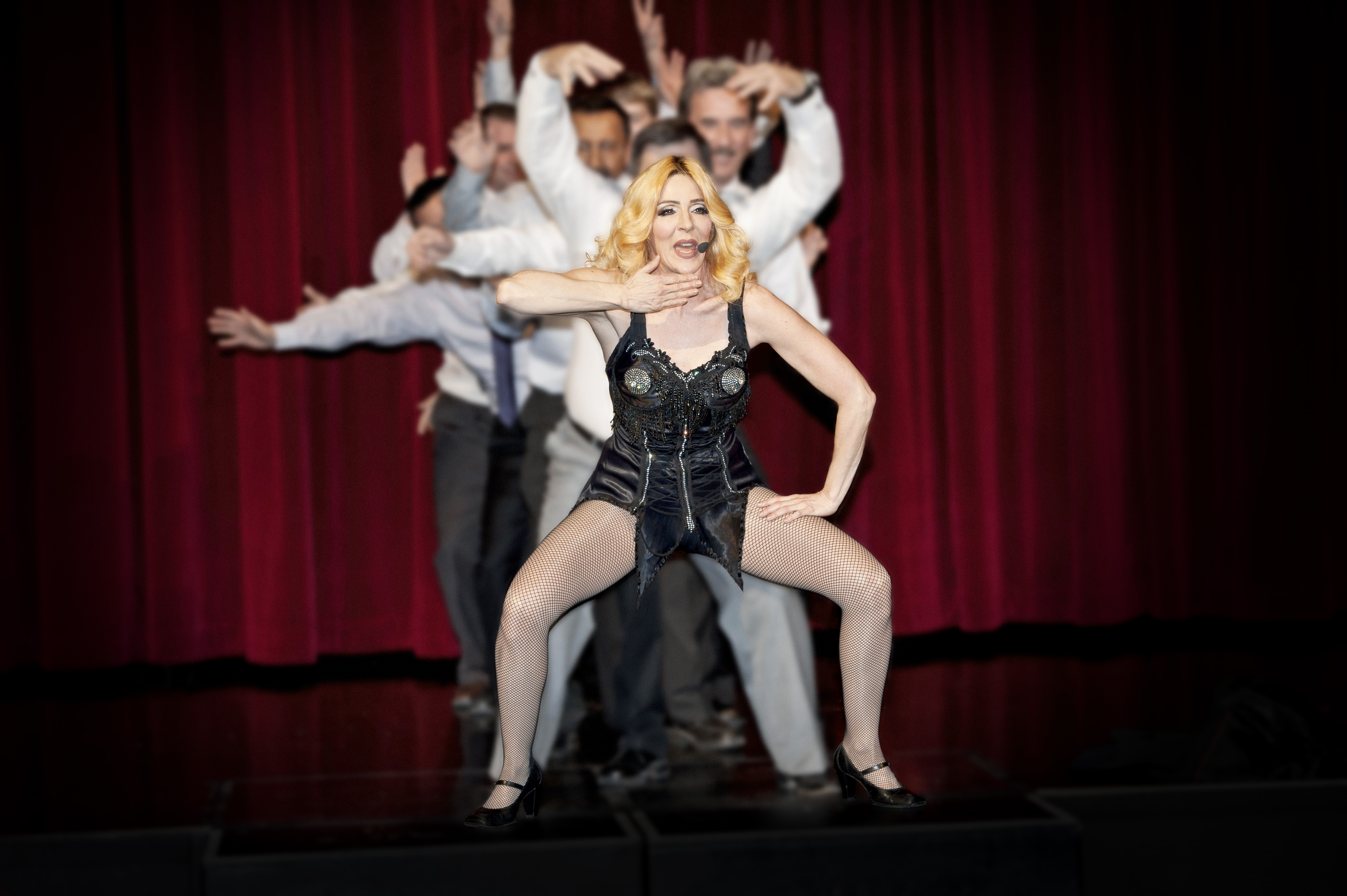
Madonna was seen as the responsible of bringing voguing into mainstream culture. In the image, Madonna impersonator Tracey Bell is seen voguing

Many critics and academics agree that with the song, Madonna brought voguing into mainstream culture, and also view it as one of the first mainstream pop culture works to spotlight elements from the queer, Black and Latino-led ballroom scene. Boston.com's Scott Kearnan noted that although Madonna has occasionally been accused of cultural appropriation for taking vogue mainstream, "she never obfuscated or demeaned its roots", and concluded that "even at an especially homophobic time, Madonna's gay dancers were shown as front, center, and fabulous, striking a pose alongside the most famous woman on Earth." Jon Blistein from Rolling Stone had similar thoughts, criticizing the mainstream's willingness to seriously engage with that culture and craft only when it is presented by white people, but stated that it "doesn't mean one can't still revel in the song's brilliance, nor do they necessarily suggest anything malicious on Madonna's part", as she "approached 'Vogue' with a clear admiration and respect for the ballroom world." For Lucy O'Brien, in her book Madonna: Like an Icon, "Vogue" was "the beginning of a new phase for Madonna. It was as if she got a sense of her immortality, and her true power. Feeling secure in her status as a mainstream artist, she began to play with that power and challenge her audience." James Rose of Daily Review agreed, writing that with the song Madonna began "a phase of her career that oscillates between cynical self-exploitation and courageous self-expression. Raunchy videos, explicitly themed lyrics and boudoir beats became de rigueur for the lady now arguably bearing the biggest name in popular music."

Before Madonna popularized the dance, voguing was performed mostly in bars and discos of New York City in the underground gay scene. According to O'Brien, when "Vogue" became the "Number 1 hit of that summer, [it was] played in clubs across the globe, from London to New York to Bali", also pointing out that it "rode the crest of the newly emerging dance craze, where club culture, house music and techno met the mainstream. 'Vogue' reflected the new hedonism; positive, upbeat, and totally inclusive". Liam Hess of Vogue commented that "this subcultural movement had officially boiled over into the zeitgeist" as "many were mimicking the playful, exaggerated gestures of the Harlem ballrooms" around the world. Steven Canals, the co-creator of the TV series Pose stated, "If we're looking at the history of ballroom and specifically that moment in time, what Madonna did was bring ballroom to the mainstream. She introduced the world to this community who, up until that point in time, had been a subculture." Voguing has since become a prominent dance form practised worldwide, and many female performers have followed Madonna's footsteps, adopting the dance style and incorporating it into their music videos and performances.

The song is also noted for bringing house music into mainstream popular music, as well as for reviving disco music a decade after its commercial death. Erick Henderson of Slant Magazine explained that the song was "instrumental in allowing disco revivalism to emerge, allowing the denigrated gay genre to soar once again within the context of house music, the genre disco became in its second life." Sal Cinquemani of the same publication wrote that the song was "making its impact all the more impressive (it would go on to inspire a glut of pop-house copycats) and begging the question: If disco died a decade earlier, what the fuck was this big, gay, fuscia drag-queen boa of a dance song sitting on top of the charts for a month for?" According to Tom Breiham of Stereogum, "Vogue" was certainly the first number-one house track ever. He added, "House, like voguing itself, had been a relatively underground club phenomenon a few years earlier, and it had only started to make inroads into the mainstream. As far as this column is concerned, that breakthrough might be the main legacy of 'Vogue'".

== Track listing ==
- US 7-inch and cassette single, Japanese 3-inch CD single
1. "Vogue" (single version) – 4:19
2. "Vogue" (Bette Davis dub) – 7:26
- UK and European 7-inch and cassette single
1. "Vogue" (single version) – 4:19
2. "Keep It Together" (single remix) – 4:31
- US CD maxi-single and digital EP
1. "Vogue" (single version) – 4:19
2. "Vogue" (12-inch version) – 8:25
3. "Vogue" (Bette Davis dub) – 7:26
4. "Vogue" (Strike-A-Pose dub) – 7:36
- US 12-inch maxi-single
1. "Vogue" (12-inch version) – 8:25
2. "Vogue" (Bette Davis dub) – 7:26
3. "Vogue" (Strike-A-Pose dub) – 7:36
- UK and European 12-inch and CD single
1. "Vogue" (12-inch version) – 8:25
2. "Keep It Together" (12-inch remix) – 7:50
- UK 12-inch single
1. "Vogue" (12-inch version) – 8:25
2. "Vogue" (Strike-A-Pose dub) – 7:36
- Japanese CD EP
1. "Vogue" (12-inch version) – 8:25
2. "Vogue" (Bette Davis dub) – 7:26
3. "Vogue" (Strike-A-Pose dub) – 7:36
4. "Hanky Panky" (Bare Bottom 12-inch mix) – 6:36
5. "Hanky Panky" (Bare Bones single mix) – 3:52
6. "More" (album version) – 4:58

== Personnel ==
Personnel are adapted from the album's liner notes.

- Madonna – writing, vocals, production
- Shep Pettibone – writing, production, mixing
- Craig Kostich – executive producer
- Tony Shimkin – editing
- Fred McFarlane – keyboards, bass, programming
- Alan Friedman – programming
- Goh Hotoda – mix engineering
- P. Dennis Mitchell – engineering assistance
- Curt Frasca – engineering assistance
- Donna De Lory – background vocals
- Niki Haris – background vocals
- N'Dea Davenport – background vocals

== Charts ==
=== Weekly charts ===
Weekly chart performance
Chart (1990–1991)	Peak position
Australia (ARIA) with "Keep It Together"	1
Austria (Ö3 Austria Top 40)	7
Belgium (Ultratop 50 Flanders)	2
Canada Retail Singles (The Record)	1
Canada Top Singles (RPM)	1
Canada Adult Contemporary (RPM)	6
Canada Dance/Urban (RPM)	1
Denmark (IFPI)	3
Europe (European Hot 100 Singles)	1
Finland (Suomen virallinen lista)	1
France (SNEP)	9
Germany (GfK)	4
Greece (IFPI)	1
Iceland (Íslenski listinn)	2
Ireland (IRMA)	2
Italy (Musica e dischi)	1
Italy Airplay (Music & Media)	2
Japan (Oricon Singles Chart)	21
Japan (Oricon International Singles Chart)	1
Luxembourg (Radio Luxembourg)	1
Netherlands (Dutch Top 40)	2
Netherlands (Single Top 100)	2
New Zealand (Recorded Music NZ)	1
Norway (VG-lista)	1
Portugal (AFP)	2
Peru (UPI)	10
Spain (AFYVE)	1
Sweden (Sverigetopplistan)	1
Switzerland (Schweizer Hitparade)	2
UK Singles (Official Charts)	1
US Billboard Hot 100	1
US Adult Contemporary (Billboard)	23
US Dance Club Songs (Billboard)	1
US Dance Singles Sales (Billboard)	1
US Hot R&B/Hip-Hop Songs (Billboard)	16
US Cash Box Top 100	1

Weekly chart performance
Chart (2010)	Peak position
UK Dance (Official Charts)	35

Weekly chart performance
Chart (2017)	Peak position
UK Vinyl Singles	30

=== Year-end charts ===
Year-end chart performance
Chart (1990)	Position
Australia (ARIA)	3
Belgium (Ultratop 50 Flanders)	17
Brazil (Brazilian Radio Airplay)	10
Canada Top Singles (RPM)	4
Canada Adult Contemporary (RPM)	52
Canada Dance/Urban (RPM)	1
Europe (European Hot 100 Singles)	2
France (SNEP)	31
Germany (Media Control)	19
Netherlands (Dutch Top 40)	33
Netherlands (Single Top 100)	22
New Zealand (RIANZ)	3
Norway Spring Period (VG-lista)	2
Spain (AFYVE)	2
Sweden (Topplistan)	5
Switzerland (Schweizer Hitparade)	12
UK Singles (OCC)	8
US Billboard Hot 100	5
US Dance Club Play (Billboard)	12
US Cash Box Top 100	1

=== Decade-end charts ===
Decade-end chart performance
Chart (1990–1999)	Position
Belgium (Ultratop 50 Flanders)	174
Canada (Nielsen SoundScan)	66
US Billboard Hot 100	93

=== All-time charts ===
All-time chart performance
Chart (1958–2018)	Position
US Billboard Hot 100	197

== Certifications and sales ==
Certifications and sales
Region	Certification	Certified units/sales
Australia (ARIA)	2× Platinum	140,000^{^}
Brazil (Pro-Música Brasil)	Gold	30,000^{*}
Canada (Music Canada)	Platinum	100,000^{^}
France (SNEP)	Silver	200,000^{*}
Italy (FIMI) since 2009	Gold	50,000^{‡}
Japan (RIAJ)	Gold	52,370
New Zealand (RMNZ) Physical only	Gold	5,000^{*}
New Zealand (RMNZ) Digital sales + streaming	Platinum	30,000^{‡}
United Kingdom (BPI)	Platinum	600,000^{‡}
United States (RIAA)	3× Platinum	3,000,000^{‡}
Summaries
Worldwide	—	6,000,000
^{*} Sales figures based on certification alone.^{^} Shipments figures based on certification alone.^{‡} Sales+streaming figures based on certification alone.

== See also ==
- List of Australian chart achievements and milestones
- List of number-one singles in Australia during the 1990s
- List of Billboard Hot 100 number ones of 1990
- List of Cash Box Top 100 number-one singles of 1990
- List of European number-one airplay songs of the 1990s
- List of number-one singles of 1990 (Canada)
- List of number-one singles of 1990 (Spain)
- List of UK Singles Chart number ones of the 1990s
