= Thou Shalt Not =

Thou Shalt Not may refer to:

- "Thou shalt not", the initial phrase used in the King James Version of the Bible for most of the Ten Commandments
- ThouShaltNot, a former music band
- Thou Shalt Not (musical), a Broadway musical based on the novel Thérèse Raquin by Émile Zola
  - Thou Shalt Not (album), a cast recording
- "Thou Shalt Not...", a 1989 episode of television series Quantum Leap
- Thou Shalt Not (film), a 1919 American drama film directed by Charles Brabin
- "Thou Shalt Not", 1940 photograph by Whitey Schafer
