= Myles Connolly =

American novelist

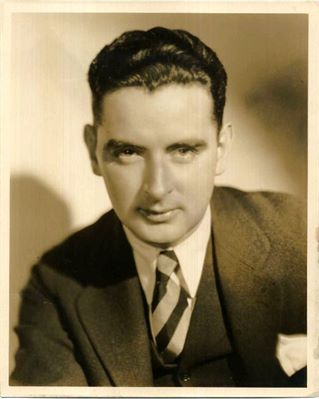
- Film Booking Office (FBO) file photo of Connolly taken circa 1929 by studio still photographer Ernest A. Bachrach
- Born: October 7, 1897; Roxbury, Massachusetts, U.S.
- Died: July 15, 1964 (aged 66); Santa Monica, California, U.S.
- Education: Boston College (1918)
- Occupations: Author; screenwriter; film producer
- Years active: 1920–1964
- Spouse: Agnes Bevington (m. 1929)
- Awards: Academy Award nomination for the screenplay for Music for Millions (1944); Retro-Hugo award nomination (Best Dramatic Presentation) for the screenplay of Harvey (1951), Writers Guild of America nomination for Best Written American Musical for Here Comes the Groom

Myles Connolly (October 7, 1897 – July 15, 1964) was an American writer and a Hollywood screenwriter/producer.

== Biography ==
Myles Connolly was born in Roxbury, Massachusetts (a neighborhood-suburb of Boston) in 1897. Connolly received his college preparatory education at Boston Latin School and then graduated as salutatorian from Boston College in 1918. After serving one year in the U.S. Navy during World War I, Connolly worked as a newspaper reporter with The Boston Post. As a reporter, he was able to lay claim to being one of the few journalists ever granted the opportunity to interview President Calvin Coolidge. For many years, Connolly was a frequent contributor of verse and short stories to national magazines; in 1928 he served on the first board of directors of the Catholic Book Club.

For four years, Myles Connolly was editor of Columbia, the official Knights of Columbus magazine. In a 1951 interview with Pilot which was the official publication of the Archdiocese of Boston, "Connolly recalled that he wrote much of the magazine himself in the middle of the night, sometimes using pseudonyms for various articles". Even so, in his tenure as magazine editor, the magazine published 5 original articles by G.K. Chesterton and 10 original articles by Hilaire Belloc. When the Catholic Church in Mexico was persecuted during the imposition of Calles Law and Knights of Columbus leadership spoke out against the Mexican government as well as against the silence of the U.S. government, Columbia editor Connolly boldly produced a November 1926 issue cover with Knights carrying banners declaring "Liberty" and "The Red Peril of Mexico". As a result, the Mexican legislature "banned the Order and the magazine throughout the country".

Connolly courted Nashville socialite and acclaimed New York concert pianist Agnes Bevington for four years. The couple were married May 29, 1929. Both Connolly and Agnes were devout Roman Catholics and each had a sister who was a nun. Their daughter, Mary, also became a nun and Mrs. Connolly had a nephew who was a priest. Mary Connolly Breiner eventually left consecrated religious life to marry and work as a psychologist. In 2016 and 2017, she wrote the preface to her father Myles' books when they were re-published by Cluny Media as classic texts. In addition to their daughter Mary, Myles and Agnes had four other children: Kevin, Terrence, Myles Jr. and Ann. Connolly dedicated each of his novels to one or some of his immediate family members.

Connolly had a fan in fellow Bostonian Joseph P. Kennedy. Kennedy convinced Connolly to leave Boston to work at the Hollywood movie studio that Kennedy financed, Film Booking Office (FBO). He began his work at FBO as a film producer in the 1929 Frank Craven and Richard Rosson comedy The Very Idea. FBO was purchased by RCA to become RKO studios in 1930. At RKO, Connolly served as associate producer for that studio's earliest Wheeler & Woolsey vehicles. In 1933, his work as a screenwriter-producer of dramatic films was introduced with The Right to Romance.

Connolly eventually befriended director Frank Capra at a cast and crew party for Ladies of Leisure (1930) after actor Alan Roscoe invited Connolly to tag along with him to the event. Capra followed Roscoe's lead in describing the writer/producer from Boston as "a hulking, 230-pound, six-three, black-haired, blue-eyed gum-chewing Irishman with the mien of a dyspeptic water buffalo". Connolly ultimately became godfather to Capra's three children. Writer Sam Fuller described Connolly as a "wonderful man".

Though Connolly chided Capra for turning out frivolities when he thought Capra could produce thought provoking pieces, Connolly did not necessarily follow his own advice. He produced numerous pieces of escapist entertainment, such as the Tarzan pictures of the 1940s.

Myles Connolly helped write and produce over forty films. His last screenwriting credit was MGM's musical biography of Hans Christian Andersen with Danny Kaye (1952).

Connolly died following complications from open-heart surgery at St. John's Hospital in Santa Monica, California in 1964 at the age of 66 years.

== Novelist ==
Connolly wrote and published several Roman Catholic parable novels, including Mr. Blue (originally published in 1928 by the Macmillan Company and then reprinted). Although Connolly wrote additional novels, nothing came as close in popularity as Mr. Blue, which he wrote at the age of 27 years. The book remained in print for 60 years and, in spite of his steady and respectable film career, remained his most lasting legacy. The Ignatius press version went out of print in 2015. In 2016, Mr. Blue was printed again. This time, the text was published as a Cluny Media classic with Stephen Mirarchi, a professor of literature at Benedictine College in Kansas, writing the introduction and annotation of the text. In a 2017 interview with Kathryn Jean Lopez of the online news magazine Crux Now, Mirarchi explained that Mr. Blue did not sell very well when it was first published. Mirarchi and Lopez called the book a "flop". It only sold 70 copies in its first year of publication (which was before the 1929 Stock Market crash). When Dorothy Day and her work lifting up the poor with the Catholic Worker Movement began, however, "Americans started to see that there really were people like Blue in the world; he wasn't just some fanciful ideal". At that point, book sales of Mr. Blue picked up immensely.

== Screenwriting and screenwriting award nominations ==
Screenwriting credits include The Right to Romance (1933), Palm Springs (1936), Youth Takes a Fling (1938), and the Charles Vidor film Hans Christian Andersen (1952). Connolly co-wrote the Ann Sothern-Lew Ayres film Maisie Was a Lady (1941), with Elizabeth (Betty) Reinhardt. In addition, he worked with Sam Fuller to create It Happened in Hollywood. Connolly is also credited with co-writer Jean Holloway as Screenwriter for the 1946 MGM film, Till the Clouds Roll By. While Myles Connolly collaborated with Frank Capra on State of the Union (1948) and Here Comes the Groom (1951), he was also an uncredited contributor to the Capra films Mr. Smith Goes to Washington, It's a Wonderful Life and Harvey.

Myles Connolly was nominated for an Academy Award for his screenplay for Music for Millions (1944). 1n 2001, he posthumously shared the nomination for a 1951 Retro-Hugo award (Best Dramatic Presentation) for the screenplay of Harvey. In 1952, he was nominated for the Best Written American Musical award by the Writers Guild of America (WGA) for Here Comes the Groom.

== Producer ==
Connolly served as associate producer on 16 productions Productions included Jazz Heaven (1929), Hook Line and Sinker (1930), The Sin Ship (1931), The Right to Romance, and It Happened in Hollywood (1937).

== Publications ==
- Mr. Blue, 1928, dedicated to wife Agnes
- The Bump on Brannigan's Head, 1950, dedicated to wife Agnes
- Dan England and the Noonday Devil, 1951, dedicated to sons Terrence, Myles Jr., and Kevin
- The Reason for Ann, 1953, dedicated to daughter Ann
- Three Who Ventured, 1958, dedicated to daughter Mary
