= Hays Code =

U.S. film studio self-censorship rules (1930–1967)

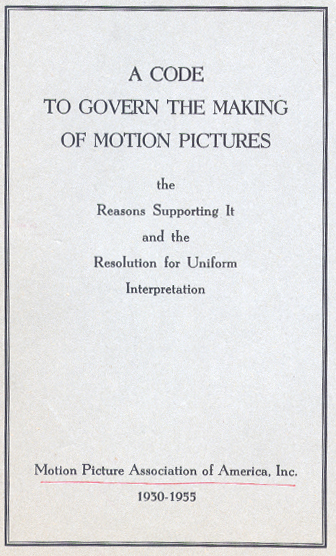
Motion Picture Production Code

The Motion Picture Production Code was a set of industry guidelines for the self-censorship of content that was applied to most motion pictures released by major studios in the United States from 1934 to 1968. It is also popularly known as the Hays Code, after Will H. Hays, president of the Motion Picture Producers and Distributors of America (MPPDA) from 1922 to 1945. The code spelled out unacceptable content for motion pictures produced for a public audience in the United States, such as drugs, profanity, and sex. Under Hays's leadership, the MPPDA, later the Motion Picture Association of America (MPAA) and the Motion Picture Association (MPA), adopted the Production Code in 1930 and began rigidly enforcing it in 1934.

From 1934 to 1954, the code was closely associated with Joseph Breen, the administrator appointed by Hays to enforce the code in Hollywood. The film industry followed the guidelines set by the code well into the late 1950s, but it began to weaken, owing to the combined impact of television, influence from foreign films, controversial directors (such as Otto Preminger) pushing boundaries, and intervention from the courts, including the U.S. Supreme Court. In 1968, after several years of minimal enforcement, the Production Code was replaced by the MPAA film rating system.

== Background ==
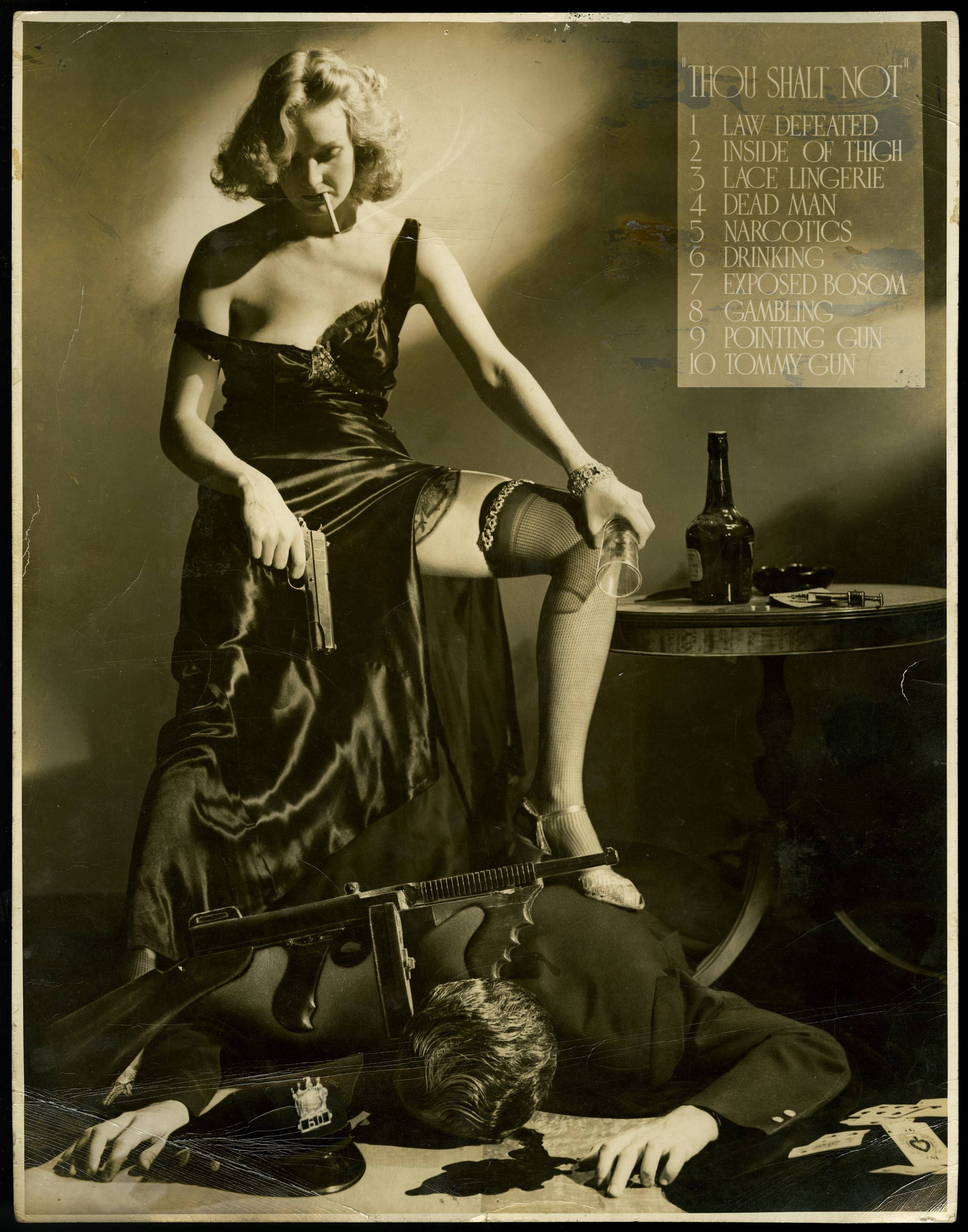
Thou Shalt Not, a 1940 photo by Whitey Schafer deliberately subverting some of the Code's strictures

In the 1920s, Hollywood was rocked by a number of notorious scandals, such as the alleged rape and manslaughter of Virginia Rappe by popular movie star Roscoe "Fatty" Arbuckle and the murder of William Desmond Taylor, which brought widespread condemnation from religious, civic and political organizations. Many felt that the film industry had always been morally questionable, and political pressure was increasing, with legislators in 37 states introducing almost one hundred film censorship bills in 1921. In 1922, as they were faced with the prospect of having to comply with hundreds and potentially thousands of inconsistent, easily changed decency laws in order to show their films, the studios chose self-regulation as the preferable option, enlisting Presbyterian elder Will H. Hays, Postmaster General under former President Warren G. Harding and former head of the Republican National Committee, to rehabilitate Hollywood's image. The move mimicked the decision that Major League Baseball had made in hiring judge Kenesaw Mountain Landis as League Commissioner the previous year to quell questions about the integrity of baseball in the wake of the 1919 World Series gambling scandal; The New York Times even called Hays the "screen Landis". Hays was paid the lavish sum of $100,000 a year ($1.92 million in 2025), and served for 25 years as president of the Motion Picture Producers and Distributors of America (MPPDA), where he "defended the industry from attacks, recited soothing nostrums, and negotiated treaties to cease hostilities".

In 1924, Hays introduced a set of recommendations dubbed "the Formula", which the studios were advised to heed, and asked filmmakers to describe to his office the plots of films they were planning on producing. In 1915, the Supreme Court had decided unanimously in Mutual Film Corporation v. Industrial Commission of Ohio that free speech did not extend to motion pictures. While there had been token attempts to clean up the films before (such as when the studios formed the National Association of the Motion Picture Industry (NAMPI) in 1916), little had come of the efforts. New York became the first state to take advantage of the Supreme Court's decision by instituting a censorship board in 1921. Virginia followed suit the following year, with eight individual states having a board by the advent of sound film, but many of these were ineffectual. By the 1920s, the New York stage, a frequent source of subsequent screen material, had topless shows, performances filled with curse words, adult subject matter, and sexually suggestive dialogue. Early in the sound system conversion process, it became apparent that what was acceptable in New York might not be so in Kansas. Filmmakers were facing the possibility that many states and cities would adopt their own codes of censorship, necessitating a multiplicity of versions of films made for national distribution. Self-censorship was deemed a preferable outcome.

In 1927, Hays suggested to studio executives that they form a committee to discuss film censorship. Irving G. Thalberg of Metro-Goldwyn-Mayer, Sol Wurtzel of Fox Film Corporation, and E. H. Allen of Paramount Pictures responded by collaborating on a list they called the "Don'ts and Be Carefuls", based on items that were challenged by local censor boards. This list consisted of eleven subjects best avoided and twenty-six to be handled very carefully. The list was approved by the Federal Trade Commission (FTC), and Hays created the Studio Relations Committee (SRC) to oversee its implementation; however, there was still no way to enforce tenets. The controversy surrounding film standards came to a head in 1929.

== Pre-Code ==
In a resolution passed on June 29, 1927, the MPPDA codified lists of "don'ts" and "be carefuls" into what they colloquially called their "Magna Charta". Many of these would later become key points in the Code.

=== Don'ts ===
"Those things which are included in the following list shall not appear in pictures produced by the members of this Association, irrespective of the manner in which they are treated":

1. Pointed profanity—by either title or lip—this includes the words God, Lord, Jesus, Christ (unless they be used reverently in connection with proper religious ceremonies), Hell, S.O.B., damn, Gawd, and every other profane and vulgar expression however it may be spelled;
2. Any licentious or suggestive nudity—in fact or in silhouette; and any lecherous or licentious notice thereof by other characters in the picture;
3. The illegal traffic in drugs;
4. Any inference of sex perversion;
5. White slavery;
6. Miscegenation;
7. Sex hygiene and venereal diseases;
8. Scenes of actual childbirth—in fact or in silhouette;
9. Children's sex organs;
10. Ridicule of the clergy;
11. Willful offense to any nation, race or creed;

=== Be Carefuls ===
"Special care [must] be exercised in the manner in which the following subjects are treated, to the end that vulgarity and suggestiveness may be eliminated and that good taste may be emphasized":

1. The use of the Flag;
2. International Relations (avoid picturizing in an unfavorable light another country's religion, history, institutions, prominent people and citizenry);
3. Religion and religious ceremonies;
4. Arson;
5. The use of firearms;
6. Theft, robbery, safe-cracking, and dynamiting of trains, mines, buildings, et cetera (having in mind the effect which a too-detailed description of these may have upon the moron);
7. Brutality and possible gruesomeness;
8. Technique of committing murder by whatever method;
9. Methods of smuggling;
10. Third-Degree methods;
11. Actual hangings or electrocutions as legal punishment for crime;
12. Sympathy for criminals;
13. Attitude toward public characters and institutions;
14. Sedition;
15. Apparent cruelty to children and animals;
16. Branding of people or animals;
17. The sale of women, or of a woman selling her virtue;
18. Rape or attempted rape;
19. First-night scenes;
20. Man and woman in bed together;
21. Deliberate seduction of girls;
22. The institution of marriage;
23. Surgical operations;
24. The use of drugs;
25. Titles or scenes having to do with law enforcement or law-enforcing officers;
26. Excessive or lustful kissing, particularly when one character or the other is a "heavy".

== Creation ==
In 1929, Catholic layman Martin Quigley, editor of the prominent trade paper Motion Picture Herald, and Jesuit priest Father Daniel A. Lord, created a code of standards and submitted it to the studios. Lord was particularly concerned with the effects of sound film on children, whom he considered especially susceptible to their allure. In February 1930, several studio heads, including Irving Thalberg of Metro-Goldwyn-Mayer, met with Lord and Quigley. After some revisions, they agreed to the stipulations of the Code. One of the main motivating factors in adopting the Code was to avoid direct government intervention. It was the responsibility of the SRC (Studio Relations Committee, precursor to the PCA), headed by Colonel Jason S. Joy, a former American Red Cross Executive Secretary, to supervise film production and advise the studios when changes or cuts were required. On March 31, the MPPDA agreed it would abide by the Code. The production code was intended to put a limitation on films which were distributed to a large audience, making it more difficult to appeal to all individuals in the audiences.

== Contents ==
The code was divided into two parts. The first was a set of "general principles" which prohibited a picture from "lowering the moral standards of those who see it", so as not to wrongly influence a specific audience of viewers including women, children, lower-class, and those of "susceptible" minds, called for depictions of the "correct standards of life", and lastly forbade a picture to show any sort of ridicule towards a law or "creating sympathy for its violation". The second part was a set of "particular applications", which was an exacting list of items that could not be depicted. Some restrictions, such as the ban on homosexuality or on the use of specific curse words, were never directly mentioned, but were assumed to be understood without clear demarcation. The Code also contained an addendum commonly referred to as the Advertising Code, which regulated advertising copy and imagery.

Homosexuals were de facto included under the proscription of sex perversion, and the depiction of miscegenation (by 1934, defined only as sexual relationships between black and white races) was forbidden. It also stated that the notion of an "adults-only policy" would be a dubious, ineffective strategy that would be difficult to enforce; however, it did allow that "maturer minds may easily understand and accept without harm subject matter in plots which does younger people positive harm". If children were supervised and the events implied elliptically, the code allowed "the possibility of a cinematically inspired thought crime".

The code sought not only to determine what could be portrayed on screen, but also to promote traditional values. Sexual relations outside marriage, which were forbidden to be portrayed as attractive or beautiful, were to be presented in a way that would not arouse passion or make them seem permissible. Any sexual act considered perverted, including any suggestion of same-sex relationships, sex or romance, was ruled out.

All criminal action had to be punished, and neither the crime nor the criminal could elicit sympathy from the audience, or the audience must at least be aware that such behavior is wrong, usually through "compensating moral value". Authority figures had to be treated with respect, and the clergy could not be portrayed as comic characters or villains. Under some circumstances, politicians, police officers, and judges could be villains, as long as it was clear that those individuals portrayed as villains were the exceptions to the rule.

The entire document was written with Catholic undertones, and stated that art must be handled carefully because it could be "morally evil in its effects", and its "deep moral significance" was unquestionable. It was initially decided to keep the Catholic influence on the Code secret. A recurring theme was "that throughout, the audience feels sure that evil is wrong, and good is right".

== Enforcement ==
=== Pre-Code Hollywood ===
The Kiss (1896), starring May Irwin, from the Edison Studios, drew general outrage from moviegoers, civic leaders, and religious leaders, as shocking, obscene, and immoral.

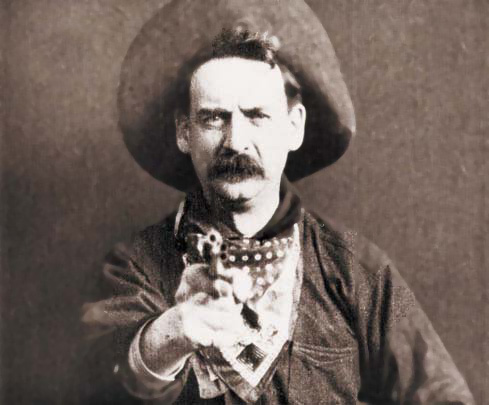
A famous shot from the 1903 film The Great Train Robbery. Scenes where criminals aimed guns at the camera were considered inappropriate by the New York state censor board in the 1920s, and usually removed.

On February 19, 1930, Variety published the entire content of the Code, and predicted that state film censorship boards would soon become obsolete; however, the men obliged to enforce the code—Jason Joy (head of the committee until 1932) and his successor, James Wingate—were generally unenthusiastic and/or ineffective. The Blue Angel, the first film the office reviewed, which was passed by Joy with no revisions, was considered indecent by a California censor. Although there were several instances where Joy negotiated cuts from films and there were definite—albeit loose—constraints, a significant amount of lurid material made it to the screen. Joy had to review 500 films a year with a small staff and little power. He was more willing to work with the studios, and his creative writing skills led to his hiring at Fox. On the other hand, Wingate struggled to keep up with the flood of scripts coming in, to the point where Warner Bros.' head of production Darryl Zanuck wrote him a letter imploring him to pick up the pace. In 1930, the Hays office did not have the authority to order studios to remove material from a film, and instead worked by reasoning and sometimes pleading with them. Complicating matters, the appeals process ultimately put the responsibility for making the final decision in the hands of the studios.

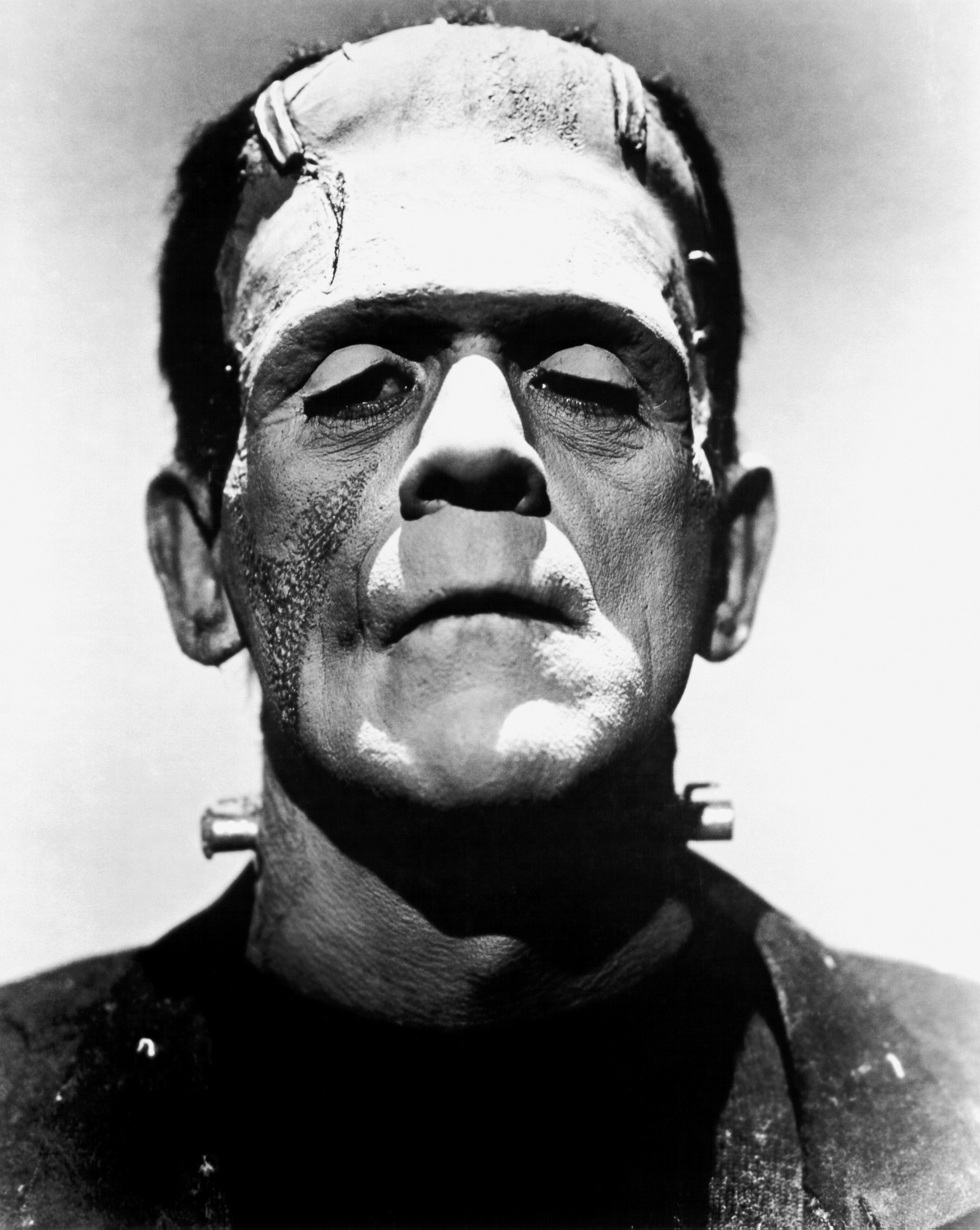
Actor Boris Karloff as Doctor Frankenstein's creation in the 1931 film Frankenstein. By the time the film's sequel, Bride of Frankenstein, arrived in 1935, enforcement of the Code was in full effect, and the doctor's overt God complex was forbidden. In the first picture, however, when the creature was born, his mad scientist creator was free to proclaim "Now I know what it feels like to be God!"

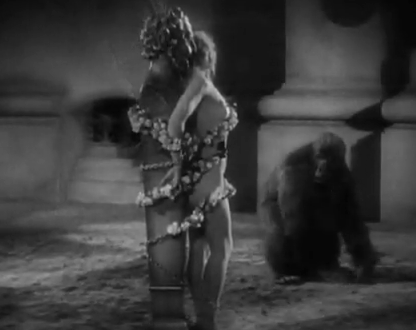
From Cecil B. DeMille's The Sign of the Cross (1932)

One factor in ignoring the code was that some found such censorship prudish, owing to the libertine social attitudes of the 1920s and early 1930s. This was a period in which the Victorian era was sometimes ridiculed as being naïve and backward. When the Code was announced, the liberal periodical The Nation attacked it, stating that if crime were never to be presented in a sympathetic light, then taken literally that would mean that "law" and "justice" would become one and the same; therefore, events such as the Boston Tea Party could not be portrayed. If clergy must always be presented in a positive way, then hypocrisy could not be dealt with either. The Outlook agreed and, unlike Variety, predicted from the beginning that the Code would be difficult to enforce. The Great Depression of the 1930s led many studios to seek income by any way possible. Since films containing racy and violent content resulted in high ticket sales, it seemed reasonable to continue producing such films. Soon, the flouting of the code became an open secret. In 1931, The Hollywood Reporter mocked the code and quoted an anonymous screenwriter saying that "the Hays moral code is not even a joke any more; it's just a memory"; two years later Variety followed suit.

=== Breen era ===
On June 13, 1934, an amendment to the Code was adopted, which established the Production Code Administration (PCA) and required all films released on or after July 1, 1934, to obtain a Seal of Approval before being released. The PCA had offices in Hollywood and New York City. The first film to receive an MPPDA Seal of Approval was The World Moves On (1934). For over 30 years, virtually all motion pictures produced in the United States adhered to the Code. The Production Code was not created or enforced by federal, state, or city government; in large part, Hollywood studios adopted it in hopes of avoiding government censorship, preferring self-regulation to government regulation.

Father Daniel A. Lord, a Jesuit, wrote: "Silent smut had been bad. Vocal smut cried to the censors for vengeance." Thomas Doherty, Professor of American studies at Brandeis University, has defined the code as "no mere list of Thou-Shalt-Nots, but a homily that sought to yoke Catholic doctrine to Hollywood formula. The guilty are punished, the virtuous rewarded, the authority of church and state is legitimate, and the bonds of matrimony are sacred." What resulted has been described as "a Jewish-owned business selling Roman Catholic theology to Protestant America".

Joseph I. Breen, a prominent Catholic layman who had worked in public relations, was appointed head of the PCA. Under Breen's leadership, which lasted until his retirement in 1954, enforcement of the Production Code became notoriously rigid. Even cartoon sex symbol Betty Boop had to change her characteristic flapper personality and dress, adopting an old-fashioned, near-matronly appearance.

However, by 1934, the prohibition against miscegenation was defined only as sexual relationships between black and white races.

The first major instance of censorship under the Production Code involved the 1934 film Tarzan and His Mate, in which brief nude scenes involving a body double for actress Maureen O'Sullivan were edited out of the master negative of the film. By the time the Code became fully functional (January 1935), several films from the pre-Code era and the transition period beginning in July 1934 were pulled from release exchanges (with some of them never again seeing public release), which led studios to remake some early 1930s-era films. 1941 saw the release of remakes of The Maltese Falcon and Dr. Jekyll and Mr. Hyde, both having had very different pre-Code versions released ten years prior.

The Hays Code also required changes regarding adaptations of other media. For instance, Alfred Hitchcock's Rebecca could not retain a major element from Daphne du Maurier's 1938 novel where the narrator discovers her husband (the aristocratic widower Maxim de Winter) killed his first wife (the titular Rebecca) and she makes light of it, since it followed Rebecca having strongly provoked and taunted him. As having a major character get away with murder and living happily ever after would have been a flagrant violation of the Code, Hitchcock's version had Rebecca die in an accident with Maxim de Winter being guilty only for hiding the facts of her death. The 2020 remake, not bound by the Code, restored du Maurier's original plot element.

The PCA also engaged in political censorship. When Warner Bros. wanted to make a film about Nazi concentration camps, the production office forbade it, citing the prohibition on depicting "in an unfavorable light" another country's "institutions [and] prominent people", with threats to take the matter to the federal government if the studio went ahead. This policy prevented a number of anti-Nazi films being produced.

Breen's power to change scripts and scenes angered many writers, directors and Hollywood moguls. Breen influenced the production of Casablanca (1942), objecting to any explicit reference to Rick and Ilsa having slept together in Paris, and to the film mentioning that Captain Renault extorted sexual favors from his supplicants; ultimately, both remained strongly implied in the finished version. Adherence to the Code also ruled out any possibility of the film ending with Rick and Ilsa consummating their adulterous love, making inevitable the ending with Rick's noble renunciation, one of Casablanca's most famous scenes.

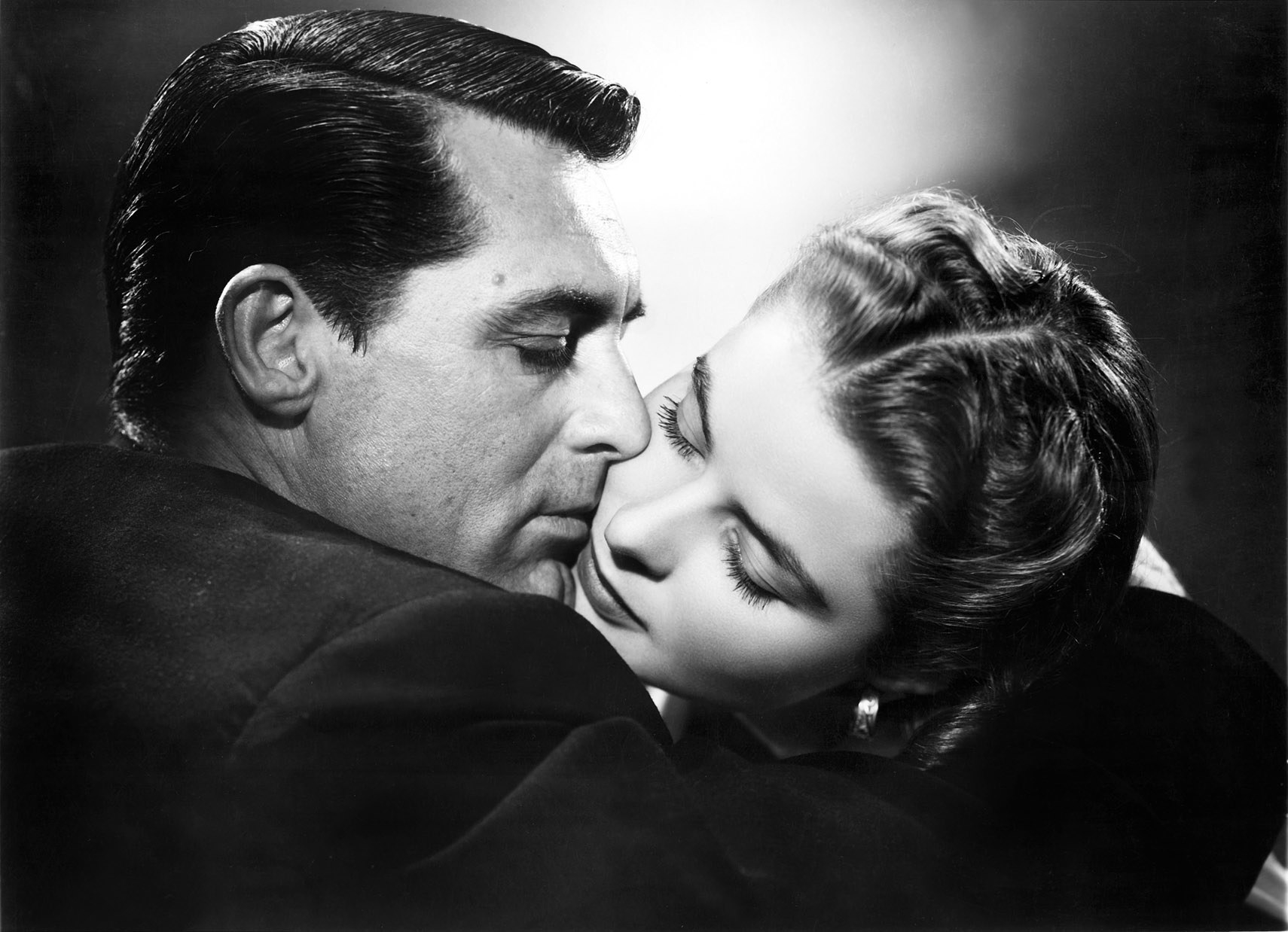
Some directors found ways to get around the Code guidelines; an example of this was in Alfred Hitchcock's 1946 film Notorious, where he worked around the rule of three-second-kissing by having the two actors break off every three seconds. The whole sequence lasts two and a half minutes.

However, some of Hollywood's creative class managed to find positives in the Code's limitations. Director Edward Dmytryk later said the Code "had a very good effect because it made us think. If we wanted to get something across that was censorable... we had to do it deviously. We had to be clever. And it usually turned out to be much better than if we had done it straight."

Outside the mainstream studio system, the Code was sometimes flouted by Poverty Row studios. Exploitation film presenters operating on the territorial (states-rights) distribution system openly violated the Code through loopholes, masquerading the films as morality tales or muckraking exposés. One example is Child Bride (1938) which featured a nude scene involving a twelve-year-old child actress (Shirley Mills).

Newsreels were mostly exempt from the Code. Their content was generally toned down by the end of 1934 (not deviating much from the Code until World War II) as the result of public outrage over coverage of the killings of John Dillinger in July, and of "Baby Face" Nelson and three girls in the Blue Ridge Mountains, the latter two occurring during the same week in November.

However, the most famous defiance of the Code was the case of The Outlaw, a western produced by Howard Hughes which was denied a Seal of Approval after it was completed in 1941 since advertising focused particular attention on Jane Russell's breasts. When the film's initial 1943 release was shuttered by the MPPDA after a week, Hughes eventually persuaded Breen this did not violate the Code and the film could be shown, although without a Seal of Approval. The film was generally released in 1946.

The David O. Selznick production Duel in the Sun, featuring several on-screen deaths, adultery and displays of lust, was also released in 1946 without the approval of the Hays Office.

The financial success of "Outlaw" and "Duel" was a deciding factor in the weakening of the Code in the late 1940s, when the formerly taboo subjects of rape and miscegenation were allowed in Johnny Belinda (1948) and Pinky (1949), respectively. In 1951, the MPAA revised the Code to make it more rigid, spelling out more prohibited words and subjects.

That same year, however, MGM head Louis B. Mayer, one of Breen's foremost allies, was ousted after a series of disputes with the studio's production head, Dore Schary, whose preference for gritty "social realism" films was often at odds with the Hays Office. Breen retired in 1954 largely because of ill health, and Geoffrey Shurlock was appointed his successor.

=== Post-Breen era ===
Hollywood continued to work within the confines of the Production Code throughout the late 1940s and 1950s, but during this time, the film industry was faced with serious competition. The first threat came from television, a new technology that allowed TV owners to stay home for entertainment - including motion pictures. Hollywood needed to offer the public something it could not get on television, which itself was under an even more restrictive censorship code.

In addition to the threat of television, the industry was enduring a period of economic difficulties compounded by the result of United States v. Paramount Pictures, Inc. (1948), in which the Supreme Court outlawed vertical integration as a violation of anti-trust laws. Studios were forced not only to give up ownership of theaters, but were unable to control what exhibitors offered. This led to increasing competition from foreign films not bound by the Code, such as Vittorio De Sica's Bicycle Thieves (1948), released in the United States in 1949.

In 1950, film distributor Joseph Burstyn released The Ways of Love which included The Miracle. This short film was originally part of L'Amore (1948), an anthology film directed by Roberto Rossellini. Because The Miracle was thought to mock the Nativity, the New York State Board of Regents (in charge of film censorship in the state) revoked the film's license. The ensuing lawsuit, Joseph Burstyn, Inc. v. Wilson (dubbed the "Miracle Decision") was resolved by the Supreme Court in 1952. The Court unanimously overruled its 1915 decision (Mutual Film Corporation v. Industrial Commission of Ohio) and held that motion pictures were entitled to First Amendment protection, thus The Miracle could not be banned. This reduced the threat of government regulation which had formerly been cited as justification for the Production Code, and the PCA's powers over the Hollywood industry were greatly reduced.

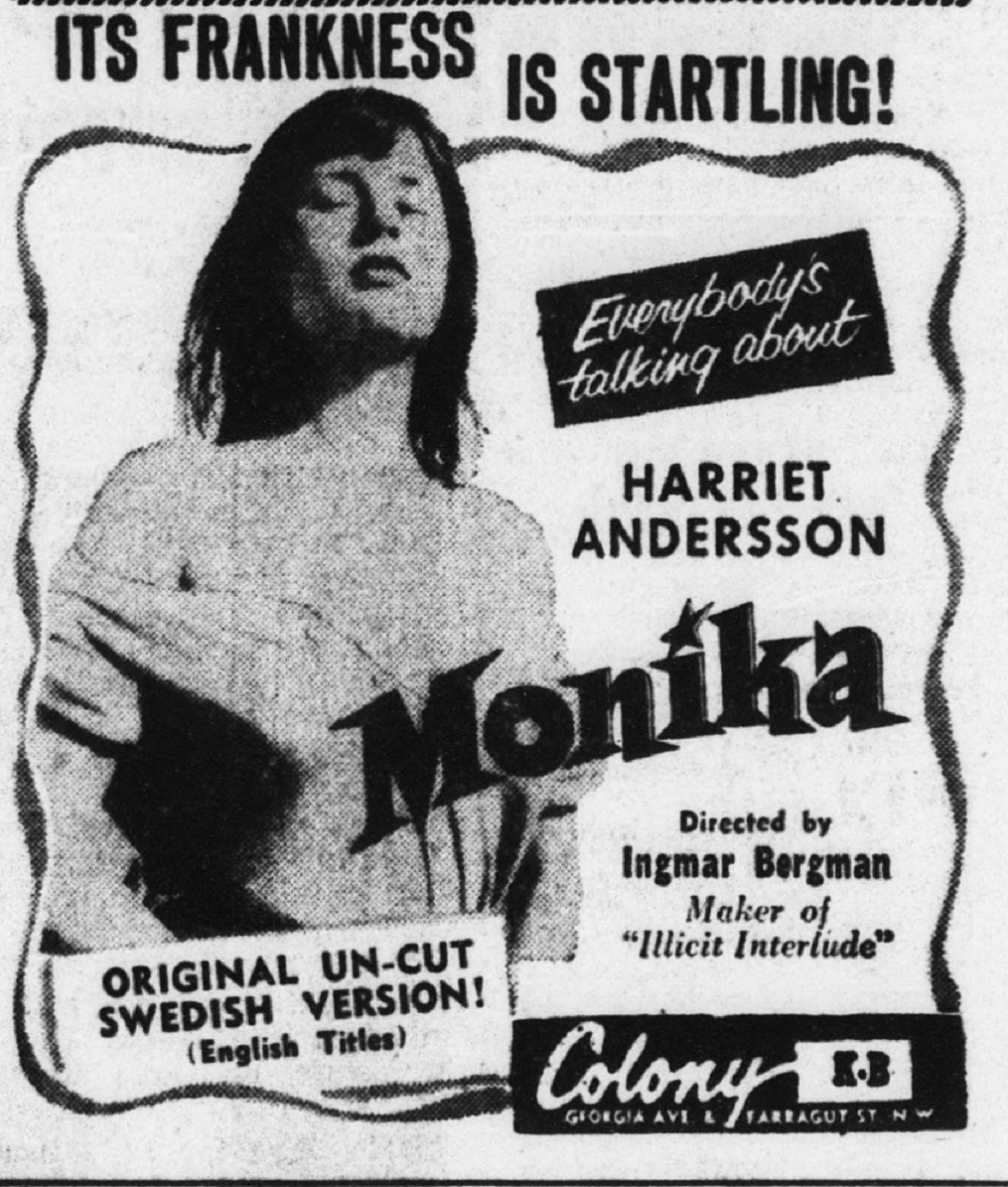
U.S. theatrical advertisement from 1955 for Ingmar Bergman's Summer with Monika (1953)

Two Swedish films, One Summer of Happiness (1951) and Ingmar Bergman's Summer with Monika (1953) were released in 1955 as exploitation movies, their success leading to a wave of sexually-provocative European product reaching American theaters. Some British films, such as Victim (1961), A Taste of Honey (1961), and The Leather Boys (1964) challenged traditional gender roles and openly confronted prejudices against homosexuals, all in clear violation of the Production Code.

Furthermore, the postwar years saw a gradual, if moderate, liberalization of American culture. A boycott by the National Legion of Decency no longer guaranteed a film's commercial failure (to the point that several films were no longer condemned by the Legion by the 1950s), and several aspects of the Code had slowly lost their taboo. In 1956, areas of the Code were rewritten to accept subjects such as miscegenation, adultery, and prostitution. For example, a proposed remake of Anna Christie, a pre-Code film dealing with prostitution, was canceled by MGM in 1940 and 1946, as the character Anna was not allowed to be portrayed as a prostitute. By 1962, such subject matter was acceptable, and the original film was given a Seal of Approval.

Two 1956 films, The Bad Seed and Baby Doll, generated great controversy involving the PCA. The first dealt with the deaths of children, including that of the "wicked child" protagonist Rhoda at the end, which had been the result of changing the ending from the original novel to abide with the Code's "crime must not pay" rule. On the other hand, the second film was vociferously attacked by religious and moral leaders, partly because of its provocative publicity, while the MPAA attracted great criticism for approving a film that ridiculed law enforcement and often used racial epithets. However, the Legion's condemnation of the film did not attract a unified response from religious authorities, some of which considered that other films, including The Ten Commandments (released that same year), had a similar amount and intensity of sensuous content.

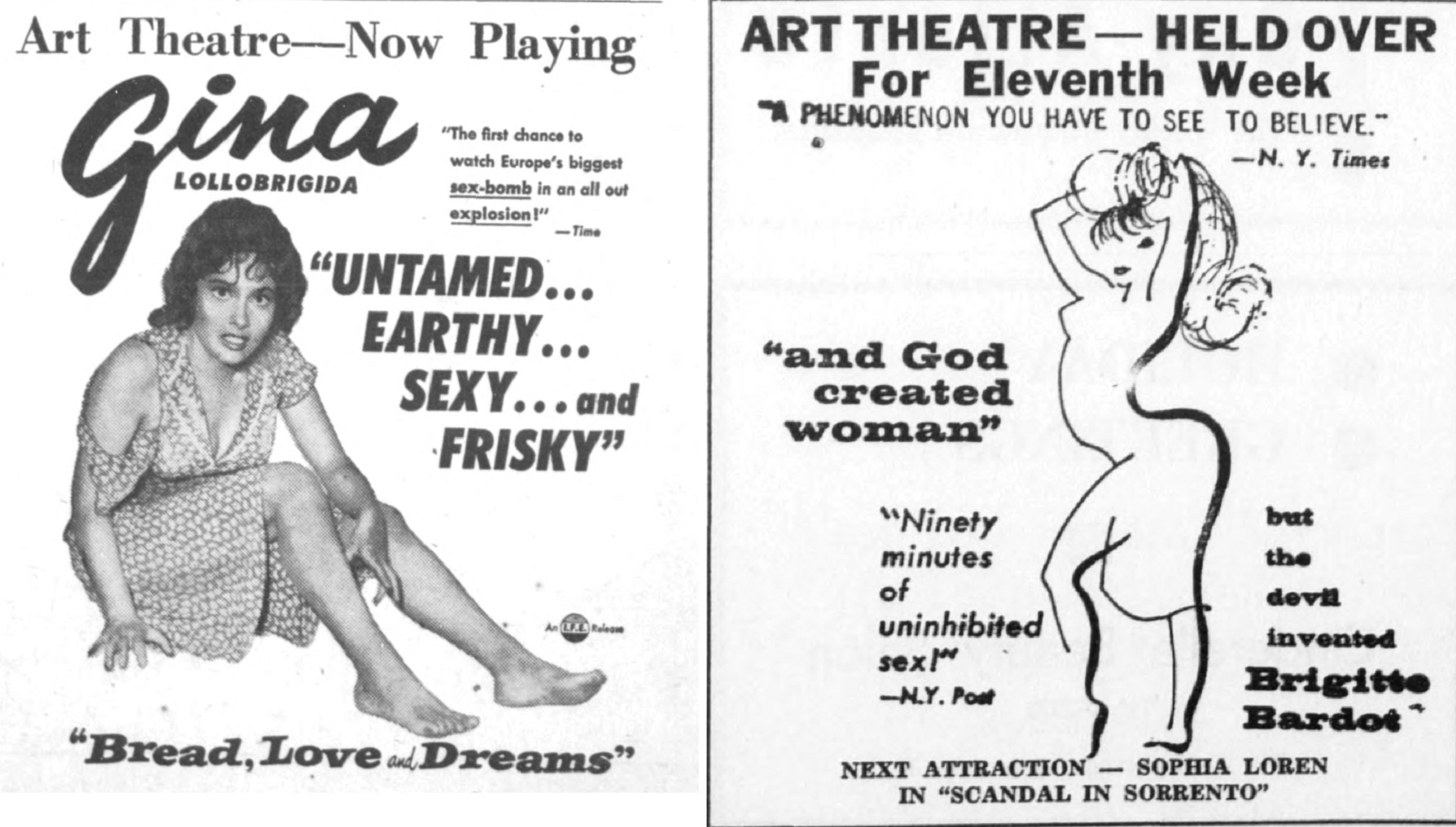
U.S. art-house advertisements from the 1950s. Many Americans at the time turned towards racier and more provocative foreign films, which remained largely free from code restrictions.

During the 1950s, studios found ways of complying with the Code while circumventing it. In 1956, Columbia acquired an art-house distributor which specialized in importing foreign art films, Kingsley Productions, in order to distribute and capitalize on the notoriety of the film And God Created Woman (1956). Columbia's agreement with the MPAA forbade it from distributing a film without a Seal of Approval, but the agreement did not specify what a subsidiary could do. Thus, exempt from the rules imposed by the Code, subsidiary distributors were utilized and even created by major studios such as Columbia in order to defy and weaken the Code.

United Artists followed suit and bought art film distributor Lopert Films in 1958, and within a decade all the major studios were distributing foreign art films.

Author Peter Lev writes:

Explicit sexuality became expected in foreign films, to such an extent that "foreign film", "art film", "adult film" and "sex film" were for several years almost synonyms.

Beginning in the late 1950s, increasingly explicit films began to appear, such as Cat on a Hot Tin Roof (1958), Suddenly, Last Summer (1959), Psycho (1960), and The Dark at the Top of the Stairs (1960), often dealing with adult subjects and sexual matters that had not been seen in Hollywood films since enforcement of the Production Code began in 1934. The MPAA reluctantly granted a Seal of Approval for these films, although not until certain changes were made. Owing to its themes, Billy Wilder's Some Like It Hot (1959) was not granted a Seal of Approval but still became a box office smash; as a result, it further weakened the authority of the Code.

At the forefront of contesting the Code was director Otto Preminger, whose films violated the Code repeatedly in the 1950s. His 1953 film The Moon Is Blue, about a young woman who tries to play two suitors off against each other by claiming she plans to keep her virginity until marriage, was released without a Seal of Approval by United Artists, the first production distributed by a member of the MPAA to do so. Preminger later made The Man with the Golden Arm (1955), which portrayed the prohibited subject of drug abuse, and Anatomy of a Murder (1959), which dealt with murder and rape. Like Some Like It Hot, Preminger's films were direct assaults on the authority of the Production Code, and their success hastened its abandonment.

In 1964, the Holocaust film The Pawnbroker, directed by Sidney Lumet and starring Rod Steiger, was initially rejected because of two scenes in which actresses Linda Geiser and Thelma Oliver fully expose their breasts, and also because of a sex scene between Oliver and Jaime Sánchez that was described as "unacceptably sex suggestive and lustful". Despite the rejection, the film's producers arranged for Allied Artists to release the film without the Production Code seal, with the New York censors licensing the film without the cuts demanded by Code administrators. The producers appealed the rejection to the MPAA. On a 6–3 vote, the MPAA granted the film an exception, conditional on "reduction in the length of the scenes which the Production Code Administration found unapprovable". The requested reductions of nudity were minimal, and the outcome was viewed in the media as a victory for the film's producers.

The Pawnbroker was the first film featuring bare breasts to receive Production Code approval. The exception to the code was granted as a "special and unique case" and was described by The New York Times at the time as "an unprecedented move that will not, however, set a precedent". In Pictures at a Revolution, a 2008 study of films during that era, Mark Harris wrote that the MPAA approval was "the first of a series of injuries to the Production Code that would prove fatal within three years".

=== Abandonment ===
In 1963, MPAA president Eric Johnston, who had previously "liberalized" the Code, died. The next three years were marked by a power struggle between two factions, which led to an erratic application of the Code. Finally, the "liberal" faction prevailed by 1966, installing Jack Valenti as the Association's new head. The chaos of the interim period had rendered enforcement impossible and Valenti, an opponent of the Production Code, began working on a rating system under which film restrictions would lessen, an idea that had been considered under Johnston before he died.

In 1966, Warner Bros. Pictures released Who's Afraid of Virginia Woolf?, which was distributed with the agreement that persons under 16 would require accompaniment by a parent or adult guardian (as displayed on numerous advertising posters from its original release). As the PCA board was divided about censoring the film's explicit language, Valenti negotiated a compromise: the word "screw" was removed, but other language remained, including the phrase "hump the hostess". The film received Production Code approval despite the previously prohibited language.

That same year, the British-produced, American-financed film Blowup was denied Production Code approval for its various instances of nudity, foreplay and intercourse. Metro-Goldwyn-Mayer released it anyway, under a specially created pseudonym, Premier Productions. This was the first instance of an MPAA member company directly producing a film without a Seal of Approval. Also, the original, lengthy Code was replaced by a list of eleven points outlining that the boundaries of the new code would be current community standards and good taste. Any film containing content deemed suitable for older audiences would feature the SMA label in its advertising. With the creation of this new label, the MPAA unofficially began classifying films.

The surviving 1930 - 1968 records of the Production Code Administration, some 20,000 papers comprising files on over 5000 films, were donated to the Margaret Herrick Library of the Academy of Motion Picture Arts and Sciences in 1987.

The MPAA film rating system went into effect November 1, 1968, with the four rating symbols: "G" meaning suggested for general exhibition (persons of all ages admitted), "M" meaning suggested for mature audiences, "R" meaning suggested as restricted (persons under 16 not admitted unless accompanied by a parent or adult guardian), and "X" meaning persons under 16 would not be admitted. By the end of 1968, Geoffrey Shurlock stepped down from his post. The PCA effectively dissolved and was replaced by the Code and Rating Administration (CARA) headed by Eugene Dougherty. The CARA would replace "Code" with "Classification" in 1978.

In 1969, the Swedish film I Am Curious (Yellow), directed by Vilgot Sjöman, was initially banned in the U.S. for its frank depiction of sexuality; however, this was overturned by the Supreme Court. In 1970, because of confusion over the meaning of "mature audiences", the M rating was changed to "GP" meaning "for general exhibition, but parental guidance is suggested", then in 1972 to the current "PG" for "parental guidance suggested". In 1984, in response to public complaints regarding the severity of horror elements in PG-rated titles such as Gremlins and Indiana Jones and the Temple of Doom, the "PG-13" rating was created as a middle tier between PG and R.

In 1990, the X rating was replaced by "NC-17" (under 17 not admitted) because of the former's stigma, being associated with pornography. As the X rating was not trademarked by the MPAA (which expected producers would prefer to self-rate such product), it was soon appropriated by adult bookstores and theaters, which marketed their products as rated X, XX and XXX.

As the American Humane Association depended on the Hays Office for the right to monitor the sets used for production, the closure of the Hays Office in 1966 also corresponded with an increase in animal cruelty on sets. The association did not regain its access until 1980.

== See also ==
- The Celluloid Closet (book)
  - The Celluloid Closet (film)
- Censorship in the United States
- Chicago Board of Censors
- Classical Hollywood cinema
- Code of Practices for Television Broadcasters, which served the same purpose for television series
- Comics Code Authority, which functioned similarly for the comics industry
- Entertainment Software Rating Board, which offers ratings for video games
- Intimacy coordinator, role that assists actors
- List of pre-Code films
- PMRC, a similar group, which sought to control musical content with the Parental Advisory sticker
- Pre-Code Hollywood
- Pre-Code crime films
- Pre-Code sex films
- This Film Is Not Yet Rated

== Sources ==
- Arnold, Jeremy. "Jesse James". Turner Classic Movies. Retrieved December 4, 2014.
- Black, Gregory D. (1996). Hollywood Censored: Morality Codes, Catholics, and the Movies. Cambridge University Press. ISBN 0-521-56592-8.
- Butters Jr., Gerard R. (2007). Banned in Kansas: motion picture censorship, 1915–1966. University of Missouri Press. ISBN 0-8262-1749-4.
- "Censored: Wielding the Red Pen". Exhibit at the University of Virginia Library, September 2000 – February 2001. Retrieved November 7, 2015.
- Doherty, Thomas Patrick (1999). Pre-Code Hollywood: Sex, Immorality, and Insurrection in American Cinema 1930–1934. New York: Columbia University Press. ISBN 0-231-11094-4.
- Doherty, Thomas (May 20, 2006). "The Code Before 'Da Vinci'". The Washington Post. Retrieved February 10, 2014.
- Doherty, Thomas Patrick (2007). Hollywood's Censor: Joseph I. Breen and the Production Code Administration. Columbia University Press. ISBN 978-0-231-51284-8.
- Flinders staff. "Col. Jason S. Joy profile". Flinders Institute for Research in the Humanities. Retrieved November 7, 2015.
- Fox, David J. (September 27, 1990). "X Film Rating Dropped and Replaced by NC-17". Los Angeles Times. Retrieved April 17, 2014.
- Gardner, Eric (February 2005). "The Czar of Hollywood". Indianapolis Monthly, pp. 89–96. ISSN 0899-0328.
- Harris, Mark (2008). Pictures at a Revolution: Five Movies and the Birth of the New Hollywood. Penguin Group. ISBN 978-1-59420-152-3.
- Hirsch, Foster (2007). Otto Preminger, the man who would be king (1st ed.) New York: Alfred A. Knopf. ISBN 9780307489210.
- Holden, Henry M. (2008). FBI 100 Years. Zenith Press. ISBN 978-1-61060-718-6.
- Jacobs, Lea (1997). The Wages of Sin: Censorship and the Fallen Woman Film, 1928–1942. Madison: University of Wisconsin Press. ISBN 0-520-20790-4.
- Jowett, Garth S. (1999) [1989]. "'A Capacity For Evil': The 1915 Supreme Court Mutual Decision". In Bernstein, Matthew. Controlling Hollywood: Censorship and Regulation in the Studio Era. Rutgers University Press. ISBN 0-8135-2707-4.
- LaSalle, Mick (2000). Complicated Women: Sex and Power in Pre-Code Hollywood. New York: St. Martin's Press. ISBN 0-312-25207-2.
- LaSalle, Mick. "Pre-Code Hollywood", GreenCine.com. Retrieved October 4, 2010.
- Leff, Leonard J. (1996). "Hollywood and the Holocaust: Remembering The Pawnbroker". American Jewish History, (84) 4: 353–376. Accessed March 9, 2009. doi:10.1353/ajh.1996.0045.
- Leff, Leonard L. & Jerold L. Simmons (2001). The Dame in the Kimono: Hollywood, Censorship, and the Production Code. University Press of Kentucky. ISBN 978-0-8131-9011-2.
- Lewis, Jon (2000), Hollywood v. Hard Core: How the Struggle Over Censorship Saved the Modern Film Industry. New York University Press. ISBN 0-8147-5142-3.
- McGilligan, Patrick (2004). Alfred Hitchcock: A Life in Darkness and Light. New York: Harper Perennial. ISBN 978-0-06-098827-2.
- Mondello, Bob (August 8, 2008). "Remembering Hollywood's Hays Code, 40 Years On". NPR. Retrieved April 17, 2014.
- Mushnik, Phil (July 14, 2013). "Three Stooges first to blast Hitler". New York Post. Retrieved April 17, 2014.
- Prince, Stephen (2003). Classical Film Violence: Designing and Regulating Brutality in Hollywood Cinema, 1930–1968. Rutgers University Press. ISBN 0-8135-3281-7.
- Scott, Henry E. (2004, 2010). Shocking True Story, The Rise and Fall of "Confidential", America's Most Scandalous Magazine. Pantheon. ISBN 978-0-375-42139-6.
- Schumach, Murray (1964). The Face On The Cutting Room Floor: The Story Of Movie And Television Censorship. New York: William Morrow and Company. ISBN 978-0-3068-0009-2.
- Siegel, Scott & Barbara (2004). The Encyclopedia of Hollywood (2nd edition). Checkmark Books. ISBN 0-8160-4622-0.
- Smith, Sarah (2005). Children, Cinema and Censorship: From Dracula to the Dead End Kids. Wiley-Blackwell. ISBN 1-4051-2027-4.
- Sperling, Cass Warner, Cork Millner, and Jack Warner (1998). Hollywood Be Thy Name. Prima Publishing. ISBN 1-55958-343-6.
- Vieira, Mark A. (1999). Sin in Soft Focus: Pre-Code Hollywood. New York: Harry N. Abrams. ISBN 0-8109-8228-5.
- "Will Hays: America's Morality Czar". Encyclopedia of World Biography: 2001 Supplement. Gale Research, Inc., 2001. ISBN 978-0787652838.
- Yagoda, Ben (February/March 1980). "Hollywood Cleans Up Its Act; The curious career of the Hays Office". American Heritage, 31(2): 12–21. Retrieved March 19, 2014.
