= Whitey Schafer =

American photographer (1903–1951)

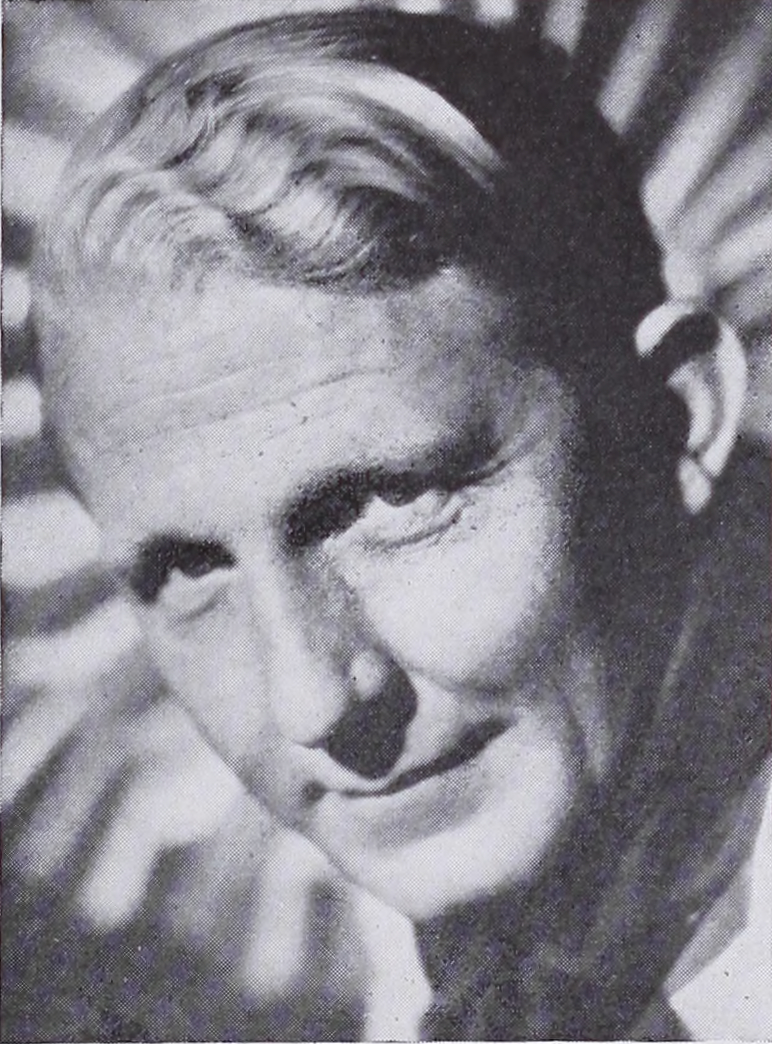
- Schafer c. May 1936
- Born: Adolph Lorenz Schafer; 1903; Salt Lake City, Utah, U.S.
- Died: August 31, 1951 (aged 47–48); Bremerton, Washington, U.S.
- Occupation: Photographer
- Children: 1

Adolph Lorenz "Whitey" Schafer (1903 – August 31, 1951) was an American photographer known for his pin-ups and glamour photography. Born in Salt Lake City, Utah, Schafer grew up in California and began working in the movies in 1921. He took still photos of movie stars for several studios, including Columbia and Paramount. Schafer was killed by an explosion on a yacht in 1951.

== Early life and education ==
Adolph L. Schafer was born in 1903 in Salt Lake City, Utah. His parents moved to California when he was six months old. He went to high school in Hollywood, California, and attended art school at some point.

== Career ==
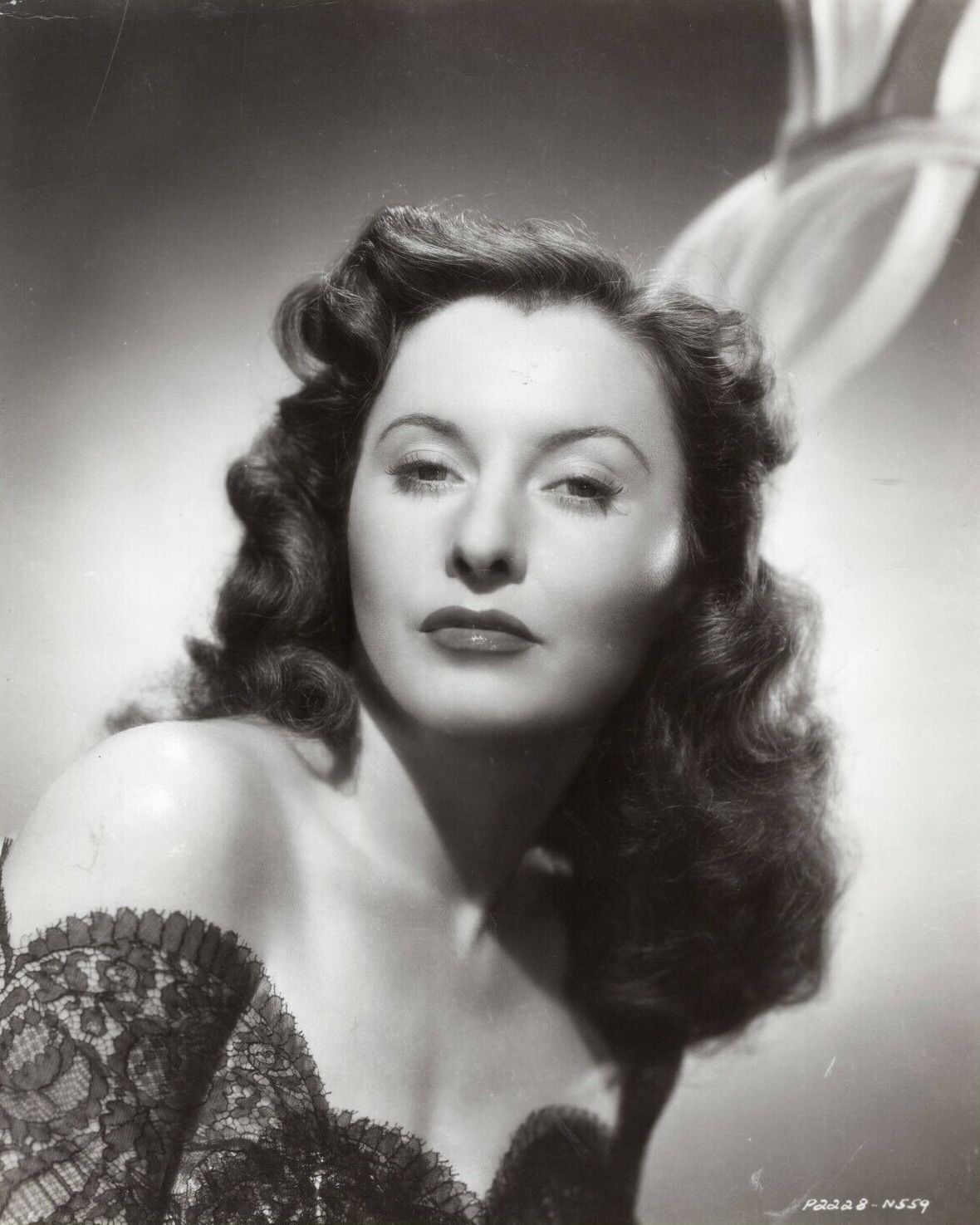
Publicity still of Barbara Stanwyck by Whitey Schafer, October 1944. Her shining shoulders are likely the result of "canned sex".

Schafer began working in the film lab of Paramount Pictures in 1921. He also worked for Thomas H. Ince's studio, Cecil B. DeMille's studio, RKO-Pathé, and Columbia Pictures, where he headed the photography department as of 1938.

In 1943, and as of 1948, Schafer was the director of still photography at Paramount Pictures. A 1943 profile of Schafer, published during World War II, emphasized his role as a pin-up and glamour photographer, referring to a fictitious serviceman abroad:

He burns for one of those works to whistle over—a pin-up portrait of flowing hair, parted lips, shining shoulders and langorous [sic] look. And Whitey and the most beautiful women in the world oblige by turning out glamor art on the double run since the wartime cry for star photographs has rocketed 100 per cent by actual studio count.

A 1947 profile described Schafer's role as "to photograph hundreds of glamour queens wearing about as much clothes [sic] as normally serves the gun crew on a battleship".

One of Schafer's techniques was the use of "canned sex", a mix of petroleum jelly with "the oil that forms on top of liquid theatrical makeup", which he would put on women's shoulders to reveal "china doll highlights". According to Schafer, "canned sex" worked better than cold cream. He believed that women did not look beautiful in the morning because their eyes were not fully open at that time. His favorite photographic subject was Marlene Dietrich. He wrote a book called Portraiture Simplified, published by Ziff Davis.

In a parody of the Hays Code, Schafer's 1940 photograph Thou Shalt Not depicts a sex worker, dead policeman, and liquor.

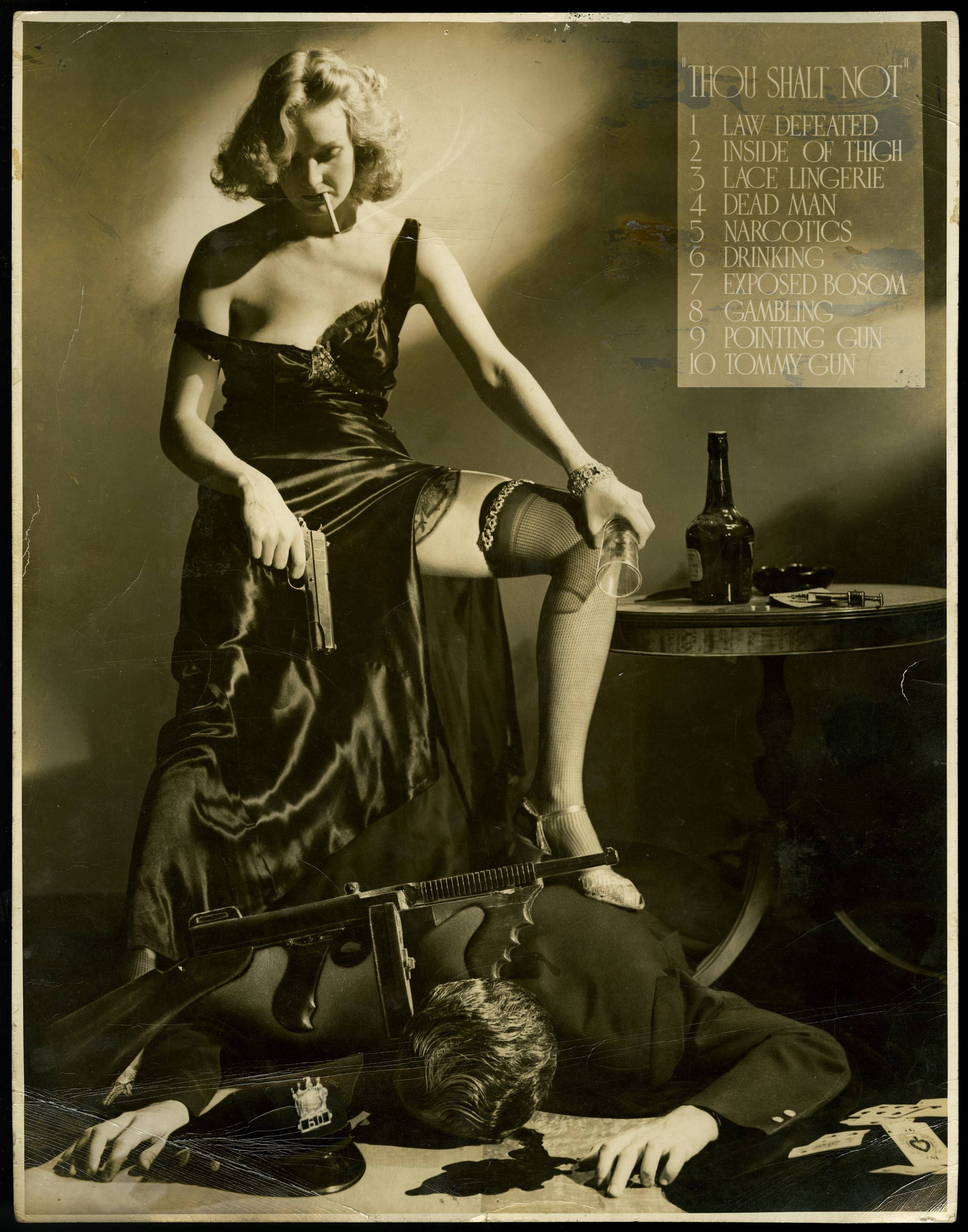
Thou Shalt Not, 1940

It lists ten objects and concepts banned by the Hays Code, each of which the photo contains.

== Personal life ==
Schafer loved silk scarves: he reportedly owned 365, one for each day of the year. His nickname came from his light blond hair. He was close friends with the actor William Boyd.

He died at Puget Sound Naval Memorial Hospital on August 31, 1951, from injuries caused by a yacht explosion in Bremerton, Washington. He was survived by his wife, Mabel, and 22-year-old son, Wayne.

== Publications ==
- Schafer, A. L. (1941). Portraiture Simplified. Ziff Davis. OCLC 5714594.
- Schafer, A. L. Whitey (February 1943). "Explore Your Home for Pictures in Pattern". Popular Science. 142 (2): 144–147. ISSN 0161-7370.
- Schafer, A. L. "Whitey" (June 1947). "My Idea of a Beautiful Woman". Movieland. 5 (5): 59–61.

== Sources ==
- Johnson, Grady (January 1948). "'Whitey' Schafer Shoots the Stars". Popular Photography. 22 (1): 56–58, 136, 138, 140–141. ProQuest 2306179888.
- Evans, Wick (June 1938). "Whitey Schafer: Hollywood's Veteran Still-Man". Popular Photography. 2 (6): 20–21, 85. ProQuest 2306108608.
