= Ernest Bachrach =

American photographer (1899–1973)

Ernest A. Bachrach (1899 – 1973) was an American photographer.

Bachrach was born in 1899 and died in 1973. He attended Stuyvesant High School. He worked at Famous Players–Lasky "right after" World War I. Around 1923, he was working in Paramount Pictures's studio in Astoria, Queens, taking stills for Gloria Swanson films. When Swanson departed New York in 1926 after forming her own company, she asked Bachrach to come with her.

As of 1946, Bachrach had been a still photographer at RKO Pictures for 18 years. He founded RKO's still photography department in 1928 following RKO's merger with Film Booking Offices of America and headed the still photography department at RKO as of 1935. He took almost all the stills of Katharine Hepburn in the 1930s, while she was with RKO.

Bachrach used Graflex cameras "to capture spontaneity".

Scholar Patricia J. Fanning calls Bachrach "one of the premier portrait photographers in Hollywood".

== Publications ==
- Bachrach, Ernest A. (September 1932). "Personality and Pictorialism in Portraiture". American Cinematographer. 13 (5): 6–7, 28.
- Bachrach, Ernest A. (March 1940). "Review of U.S. Camera, 1940". International Photographer. 12 (2): 25.

== Sources ==
- Fanning, Patricia J. (2008). Through an Uncommon Lens: The Life and Photography of F. Holland Day. University of Massachusetts Press. ISBN 978-1-61376-088-8. OCLC 794701604.
- Shields, David S. (June 18, 2013). Still: American Silent Motion Picture Photography. University of Chicago Press. ISBN 978-0-226-01343-5.
