= The Secret Six =

1931 film

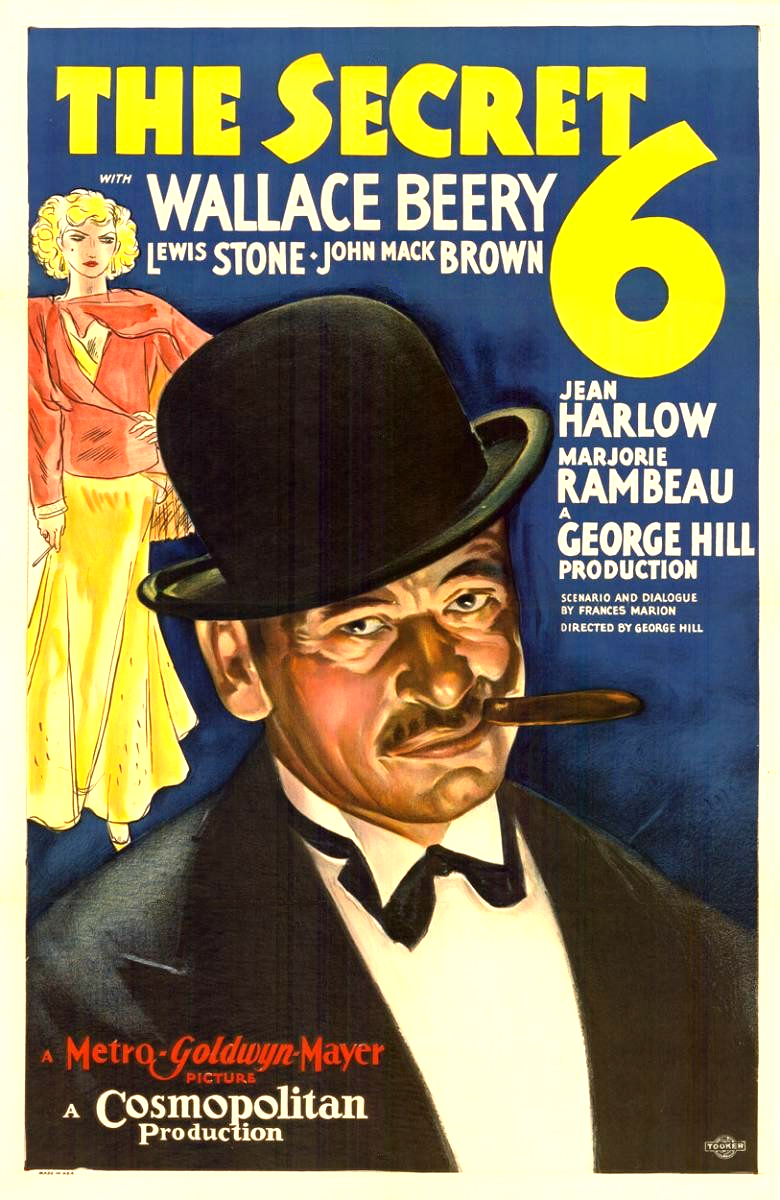
- Theatrical release poster
- Directed by: George W. Hill
- Written by: Frances Marion
- Produced by: George W. Hill; Irving Thalberg
- Starring: Wallace Beery; Lewis Stone; John Mack Brown; Jean Harlow; Clark Gable; Ralph Bellamy; Marjorie Rambeau
- Cinematography: Harold Wenstrom
- Edited by: Blanche Sewell
- Color process: Black and white
- Production companies: Cosmopolitan Productions; Metro-Goldwyn-Mayer
- Distributed by: Loew's Inc.
- Release date: April 18, 1931
- Running time: 83 minutes
- Country: United States
- Language: English
- Budget: $494,000
- Box office: $994,000

The Secret Six is a 1931 American pre-Code crime film starring Wallace Beery as "Slaughterhouse Scorpio", a character very loosely based on Al Capone, and featuring Lewis Stone, John Mack Brown, Jean Harlow, Clark Gable, Marjorie Rambeau and Ralph Bellamy. The film was written by Frances Marion and directed by George W. Hill for MGM.

== Plot ==
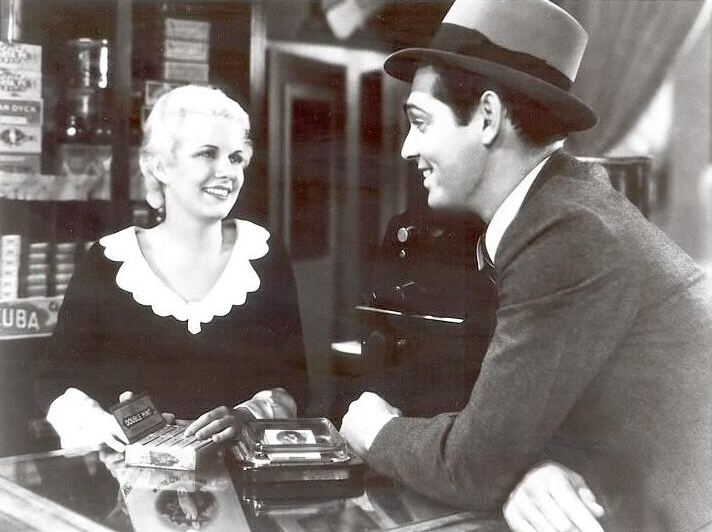
Jean Harlow and Clark Gable in The Secret Six

During the Prohibition era from 1920 to 1933, the sale of alcoholic beverages in the United States was illegal. Louis Scorpio was a stockyard worker in the small town of Centro. Bootleggers Nick "the Gouger" Mizoski and Johnny Franks recruit Nick to work for them, promising that he will make a lot of money. Richard 'Newt' Newton, the mob boss, tells his henchmen that he plans to take over territory belonging to his rival, "Smiling" Joe Colimo.

Colimo learns that Franks and Scorpio are trying to force a bar owner in his territory to buy liquor from Newton. Colimo sends Eddie, one of his gunmen, to the bar to stop them. During a shootout there, Colimo's brother is killed. Colimo had been trying to keep his brother out of the mob life. Franks and Scorpio flee to Newton's headquarters. When Colimo and his men arrive, Franks falsely tells them that Scorpio was his brother's killer.The Colimo mob shoots Scorpio, but only slightly wounds him; he manages to escape.

Later on, when Colimo is gone, Scorpio returns to the scene and shoots Franks. Scorpio is about to shoot Newton, but the police burst in, forcing him to escape. Peaches, Franks' girlfriend, becomes hysterical when she sees him dead. Reporters Carl Luckner and Hank Rogers arrived on the murder scene. They compete for the murder story as well as the attentions of Anne Courtland, another Newton girl. Scorpio later hires Courtland to keep the reporters from investing the gangsters.

Scorpio soon become a powerful player in the bootlegging racket, he orchestrates the election of Mizoski as mayor. At the same, time, Centro mayoral election victory. Soon after the new chief of police takes office, he promises to avenge his son's murder by running the gangsters out of town. Mizoski fires him from the force. After killing Colimo, Scorpio becomes the dominant bootlegger in Centro. He then announces plans to move into the big city to establish power there.

Learning about Scorpio's threat, the city establishes a special police force called the "Secret Six", consisting of six masked men. Luckner and Rogers are part of the force. They task Luckner and Rogers with gathering evidence against Scorpio and the mob, but tell him not to make any arrests until the Scorpio gang arrives in the city. When Scorpio hears about the Secret Six, he orders Rogers' murder. When Courtland overhears the plot, she runs onto the subway car to warn him. As soon as she tells Rogers that she loves him, the lights on the train go out and a shot kills him.

Scorpio is later indicted on Rogers' murder. Metz, one of the distillery lackeys thought to be a deaf-mute, cracks under police interrogation and implicates Scorpio. At Scorpio's trial, Courtland testifies that she heard Scorpio threaten to kill Hank. When the case goes to the jury, they deliver a verdict of not guilty; Scorpio had bribed them.

Later on, the Secret Six chase down Scorpio to Frank's Steak House, where he kills Newton for his money. Scorpio then runs to Peaches' apartment, seeking to hide there. However, she want revenge for him killing Franks'. She calls the police and they arrest Scorpio. He is tried again and this time convicted. The judge sentences Scorpio to death.

== Cast ==
Wallace Beery as Louis "Slaughterhouse" Scorpio

- Wallace Beery as Louis "Slaughterhouse" Scorpio
- Lewis Stone as Richard "Newt" Newton
- John Mack Brown as Hank Rogers
- Jean Harlow as Anne Courtland
- Marjorie Rambeau as Peaches
- Paul Hurst as Nick 'The Gouger' Mizoski
- Clark Gable as Carl Luckner
- Ralph Bellamy as Johnny Franks
- John Miljan as "Smiling" Joe Colimo
- DeWitt Jennings as Chief Donlin
- Murray Kinnell as "Dummy" Metz (alias of Fink)
- Fletcher Norton as Jimmy Delano
- Louis Natheaux as Eddie
- Frank McGlynn Sr. as Judge
- Theodore von Eltz as District Attorney Keeler
- Charles Giblyn as Mr. Simms - Ballistics Expert (uncredited)
- Joseph W. Girard as Official (uncredited)
- Tom London as Blackjacking Gangster (uncredited)
- George Magrill as Police Guard at Jailhouse (uncredited)
- Lee Phelps as Smelts - Waiter (uncredited)
- Hector Sarno as Finko (uncredited)

== Inspiration ==
Al Capone, the inspiration for Scorpio

Attached to Frances Marion’s script for The Secret Six was an August 16, 1930, Saturday Evening Post article about the Secret Six. This was a well-funded group of vigilantes who operated in Chicago, Illinois, from 1930 to 1933, when mistakes and scandals ended the effort. The article, entitled “Business Fights Crime in Chicago,” was authored by Secret Six founder Col. Robert Isham Randolph.

“This tribunal”, declared a prosecutor early in the film, “known only as the Secret Six, represents the greatest force for law and order in the United States. These men have gathered together to fight and destroy the vicious power of the gangster.” The film had little to do with the real Secret Six, however, taking place not in Chicago but in Central, and ignoring the considerable work done by the real Secret Six to investigate and solve kidnappings, extortions, theft and murder.

The Secret Six portrayed its crimefighters as six middle-aged business men in suits and wearing masks. Through means left unexplained in the movie, the men obtained warrants for tax evasion and arson against Scorpio and his gang members, and promised to have some of them deported and their lawyer disbarred.

== Context ==
The film was Ralph Bellamy's first screen role in what became a six-decade career. Despite being billed seventh in the cast, Clark Gable has more screen time than this implies, and much greater impact. Beery and Gable made Hell Divers (1932) the following year, this time with Gable's role and billing almost as large as Beery's. Beery, Harlow and Gable would work together again four years later in the epic seafaring adventure China Seas (1935), only with their billing reversed and all three names (Gable, Harlow and Beery) above the title.

Harlow and Gable would work together in five other films, Red Dust (1932), Hold Your Man (1933), China Seas (1935), Wife vs. Secretary (1936) and Saratoga (1937). Harlow and Lewis Stone would work together in four other films, Red-Headed Woman (1932), The Girl from Missouri (1934), China Seas (1935) and Suzy (1936).

== Box-office ==
According to MGM records, the film earned $708,000 in the US and Canada and $286,000 elsewhere resulting in a profit of $148,000.
