= Hold Your Man =

1933 film by Sam Wood

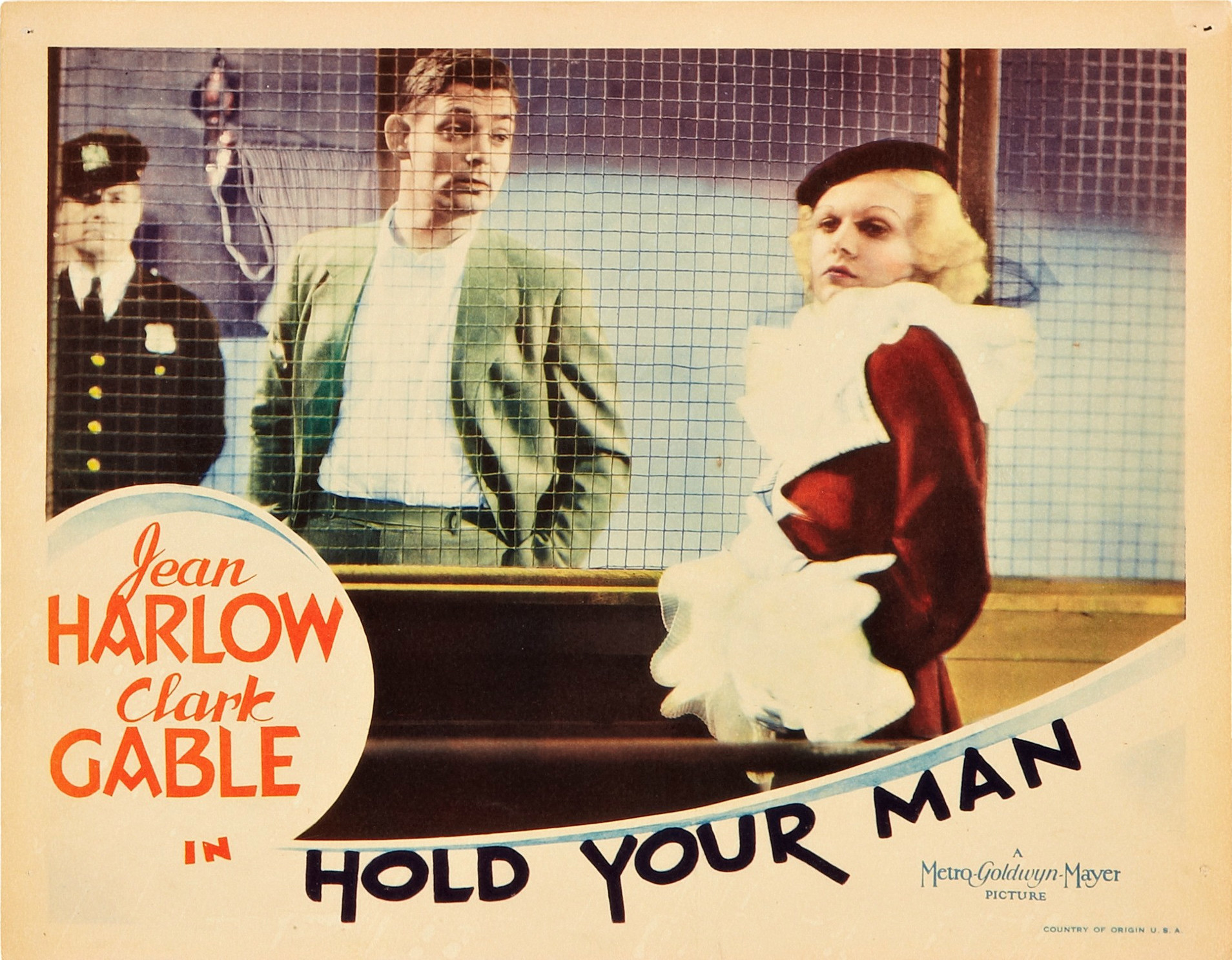
- Lobby card
- Directed by: Sam Wood
- Written by: Anita Loos; Howard Emmett Rogers
- Produced by: Sam Wood; Bernard H. Hyman (uncredited)
- Starring: Jean Harlow; Clark Gable
- Cinematography: Harold Rosson
- Edited by: Frank Sullivan
- Music by: Nacio Herb Brown (song – music); Arthur Freed (song – lyrics)
- Production company: Metro-Goldwyn-Mayer
- Distributed by: Loew's Inc.
- Release dates: June 30, 1933 (New York City); July 7, 1933 (U.S.)
- Running time: 87 minutes
- Country: United States
- Language: English
- Budget: $266,000
- Box office: $1 million

Hold Your Man is a 1933 American pre-Code romantic drama film directed by an uncredited Sam Wood and starring Jean Harlow and Clark Gable, the third of their six films together. The screenplay by Anita Loos and Howard Emmett Rogers was based on a story by Loos.

== Plot ==
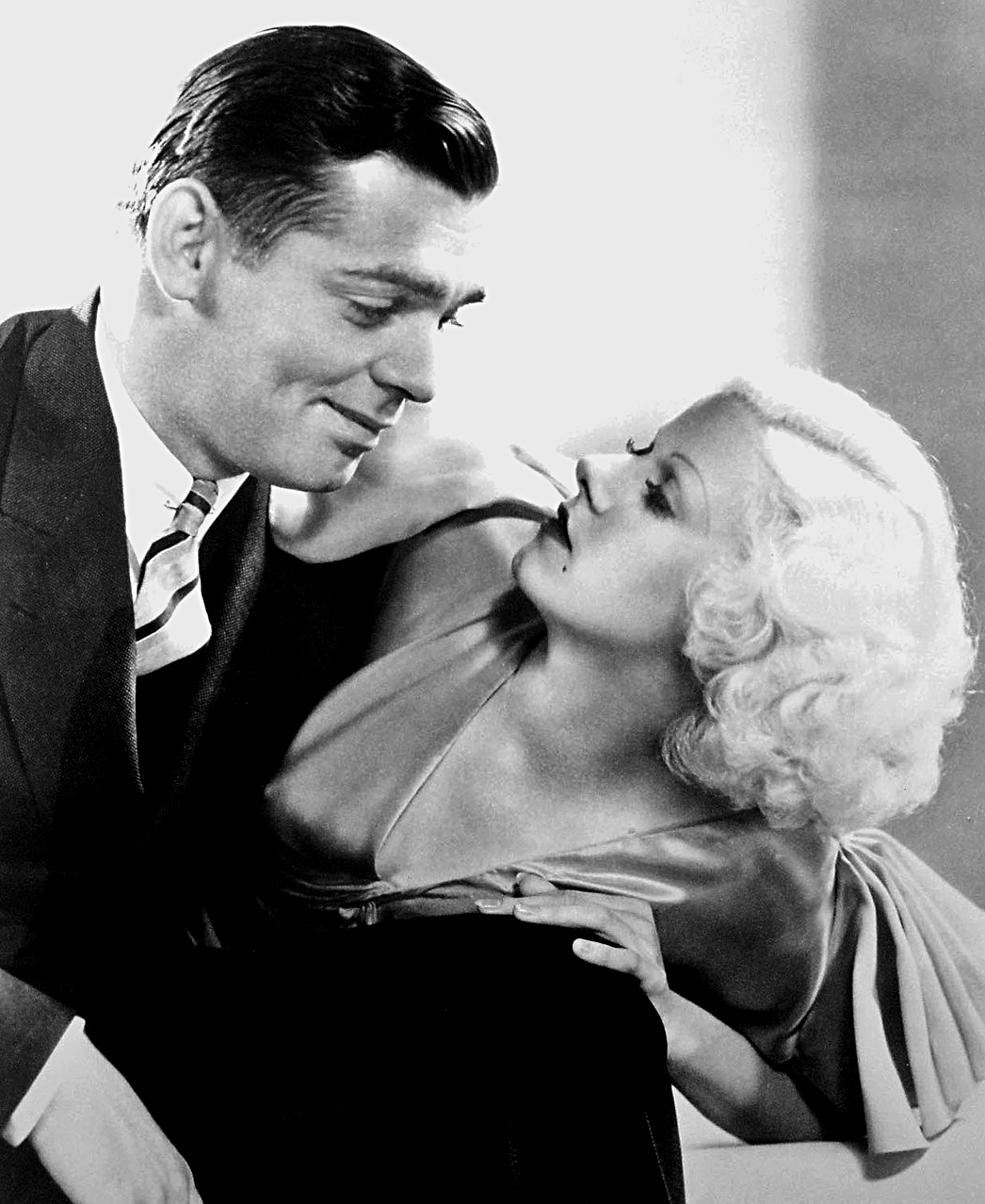
Gable and Harlow in Hold Your Man

Small-time con man Eddie Hall hides from his latest victim and a policeman in the first unlocked apartment he can find. It turns out to be occupied by Ruby Adams, a cynical woman with numerous boyfriends. When it is safe to come out, Eddie wants to become better acquainted with his pretty rescuer. Although she resists at first, she ends up falling in love with him.

Eddie's partner Slim comes up with a scheme to catch one of Ruby's married admirers in a compromising position and blackmail him, but Eddie finds at the last moment that he cannot bear to have his girl involved in something that sordid. He breaks into Ruby's apartment and punches the would-be victim, accidentally killing him. Eddie escapes, but Ruby is caught and sentenced to a reformatory for two years. One of her fellow inmates turns out to be Gypsy Angecon, Eddie's previous girlfriend.

When Eddie learns from a released Gypsy that Ruby is pregnant with his child, he visits her; but, as a fugitive, he has to pretend to be there to see another inmate. Even though the authorities become suspicious, Eddie is determined to marry Ruby so his child will not be illegitimate. With the police closing in, instead of escaping he persuades a minister visiting his wayward daughter to marry them.

Afterwards, Eddie is caught and sent to prison. When he gets out, he is welcomed by Ruby and their young son. Ruby announces that Al Simpson, who had wanted to marry her himself, has gotten Eddie a legitimate job.

== Cast ==
- Jean Harlow as Ruby Adams
- Clark Gable as Edward Huntington "Eddie" Hall
- Stuart Erwin as Al Simpson
- Dorothy Burgess as "Gypsy" Angecon
- Muriel Kirkland as Bertha Dillion
- Garry Owen as "Slim"
- Barbara Barondess as Sadie Cline
- Elizabeth Patterson as Miss Tuttle, Reformatory Matron
- Inez Courtney as Mazie, Reformatory Inmate
- Blanche Friderici as Mrs. Wagner
- Helen Freeman as Mrs. Davis

Uncredited Cast

- Theresa Harris as Lily Mae Crippen, Reformatory Inmate
- George H. Reed as Reverend Crippen
- Helen Shipman as Miss Davis
- Paul Hurst as Aubrey C. Mitchell
- Louise Beavers as Powder Room Maid
- Wade Boteler as Police Sergeant At Reformatory
- Lillian Harmer as Miss Allen

Cast notes

- About her singing in the film, Jean Harlow said, "They have me singing in a reformatory! My singing would be enough to get me in, but I'd never be able to sing my way out." The song she sings, "Hold Your Man", was written by Nacio Herb Brown (music) and Arthur Freed (lyrics). Harriet Lee was the uncredited voice double for Harlow.

== Production ==
Hold Your Man – the working titles for which were "Black Orange Blossoms", "He Was Her Man" and "Nora" – was in production from April 16 through May 1933.

Harlow and Gable made six films together, and Hold Your Man was the third, following on the great success of Red Dust (1932). In Hold Your Man, under the tightened reign of the Hays Office, Loos was forced by Louis B. Mayer, the head of MGM, to have Harlow's character be punished for her sins (Premarital sex among them), which is why Ruby spends time in a reformatory, and also why Ruby and Eddie have to get married.

Harlow and Gable's other films together include The Secret Six (1931), China Seas (1935), both with Wallace Beery, Wife vs. Secretary (1936) with Myrna Loy and James Stewart, and Saratoga (1937) with Lionel Barrymore.

Writer Anita Loos also had an extended working relationship with Harlow. Hold Your Man was the second of five films they made together, their first being Red-Headed Woman (1932), then The Girl from Missouri (1934), Riffraff (1936), Saratoga (1937).

Barbara Barondess said Gable, "wasn't the most gracious gentleman I had ever met. One day as I was walking to the lot, he caught up with me and with his false teeth flashing said, 'Hey Barbara, are you blonde all over?' I managed to suppress an urge to tell him off and simply said, 'That depends. But you will never find out.'"

== Response ==
Critics were aware that the studio was trying to have its cake and eat it too, by presenting scandalous behavior early in the film, which is then justified by the punishment the characters are made to suffer later on—a pattern that would become endemic under the Production Code. The film critic for Variety wrote, "earlier sequences have plenty of ginger, but the torrid details are handled with the utmost discretion while conveying a maximum of effect." and Frank Nugent in The New York Times wrote, "The sudden transition from hard-boiled wisecracking romance to sentimental penitence provides a jolt."

Nevertheless, the critics praised Harlow and Gable, and the film was a smashing box office success, grossing $1.1 million ($654,000 in the US and Canada and $419,000 elsewhere) on a budget of $260,000—a profit of $433,000.

Harlow was well on her way to being the biggest star in Hollywood, and her next picture, Bombshell (1933), would not even need a male star to carry the film.
