= Paula Winslowe =

American actress (1910–1996)

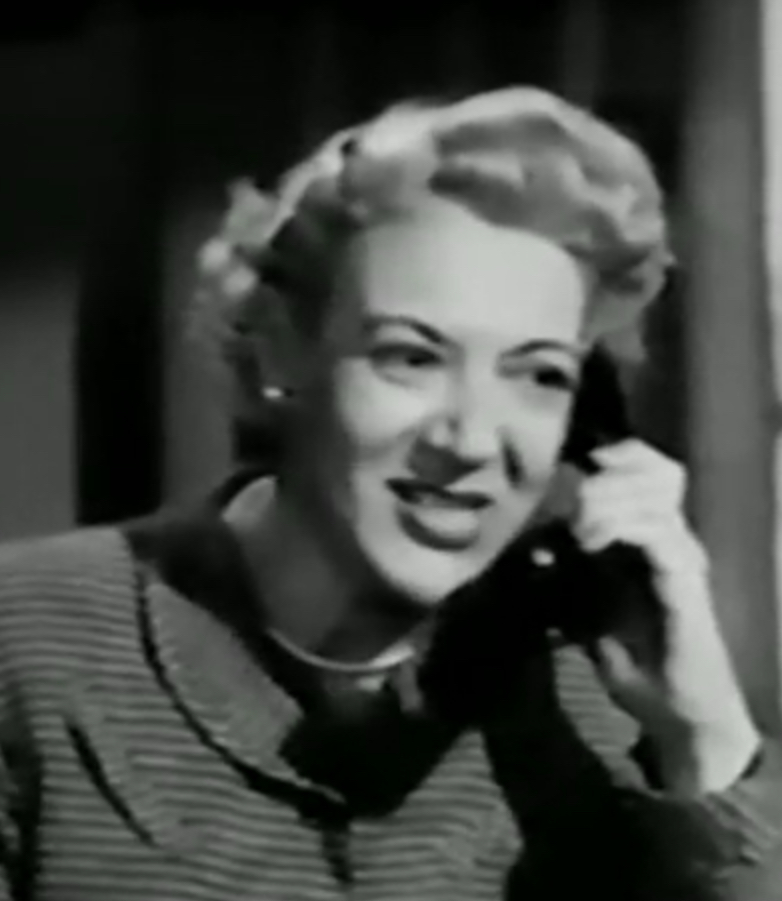
- Paula Winslowe in an episode of The Adventures of Ozzie and Harriet (1953)
- Born: Winifred Reyleche; March 23, 1910; Grafton, North Dakota, U.S.
- Died: March 7, 1996 (aged 85); Los Angeles, California, U.S.
- Occupation: Actress
- Years active: 1936–1996
- Spouse: John Sutherland (m. 1939)
- Children: 4

Paula Winslowe (born Winifred Reyleche; March 23, 1910 – March 7, 1996) was an American television, radio and voice actress, best known for her role as the voice of Bambi's mother in the 1942 movie Bambi.

== Career ==
In the early 1930s, Winslowe acted with the Marta Oatman Players and McFadden Productions. In 1937, after the death of Jean Harlow near the end of the filming of Saratoga, Winslow had the job to dub the Harlow's stand-in Mary Dees in the remaining scenes of Saratoga.

Winslowe played the role of Mrs. Martha Conklin in Our Miss Brooks on both radio and television. On radio, she played Peg Riley in The Life of Riley, She was also heard in Silver Theater, Big Town and Elliott Lewis' shows Broadway Is My Beat and On Stage.

She briefly portrayed Mrs. Foster on Big Town, which starred Edward G. Robinson. She starred in several episodes of Suspense, including June 14, 1955 ("The Whole Town's Sleeping") written by Ray Bradbury; July 11, 1956 ("Want Ad"); January 24, 1956 ("The Cellar Door"); and June 5, 1956 ("The Twelfth Rose").

Winslowe was cast in numerous TV shows, including I Love Lucy and two episodes of the courtroom drama series Perry Mason : in season 1, 1957 episode entitled "The Case of the Drowning Duck" and in season 6, 1962 episode entitled "The Case of the Unsuitable Uncle", in which she played a night court judge. She played multiple characters on The Adventures of Ozzie and Harriet. She also voiced Greta Gravel on The Flintstones (ep. The Entertainer).

In animated films, she did two voices in Disney's Bambi: Bambi's mother and the pheasant who panics when the hunters come leading to her demise.

== Personal life and death ==
She married American producer and Bambi co-star John Sutherland in 1939, and had four children. They remained married until Winslowe's death in 1996.

Winslowe died in Los Angeles, California, on March 7, 1996, at the age of 85.

== Filmography ==
- The Little Mole (1941), Mother Mole
- Bambi (1942), Pheasant / Bambi's Mother (voice, uncredited)
- North by Northwest (1959), Woman at Auction (uncredited)
