= Jean Harlow =

American actress (1911–1937)

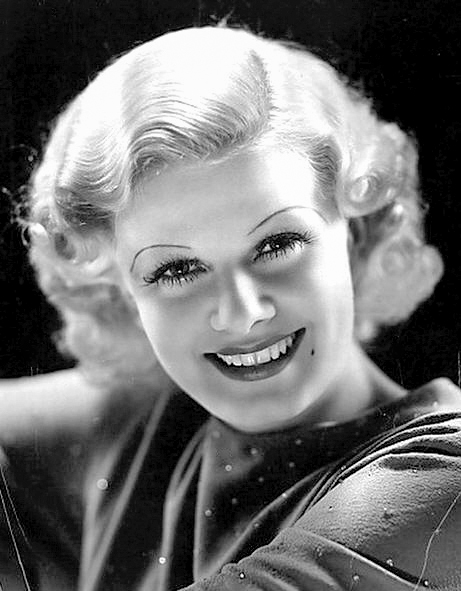
- Harlow, 1930s
- Born: Harlean Harlow Carpenter; March 3, 1911; Kansas City, Missouri, U.S.
- Died: June 7, 1937 (aged 26); Los Angeles, California, U.S.
- Resting place: Forest Lawn Memorial Park
- Occupation: Actress
- Years active: 1928–1937
- Political party: Democratic
- Spouses: Charles McGrew (m. 1927; div. 1929) Paul Bern (m. 1932; died 1932) Harold Rosson (m. 1933; div. 1935)
- Partner: William Powell (1934–1937)

Jean Harlow (born Harlean Harlow Carpenter; March 3, 1911 – June 7, 1937) was an American actress. Known for her portrayal of "bad girl" characters, she was the leading sex symbol of the early 1930s and one of the defining figures of the pre-Code era of American cinema. Often nicknamed the "Blonde Bombshell" and the "Platinum Blonde,” Harlow was popular for her "Laughing Vamp" screen persona. Harlow was in the film industry for only nine years, but she became one of Hollywood's biggest movie stars, whose image has endured in the public eye. In 1999, the American Film Institute ranked Harlow number 22 on its greatest female screen legends list.

Harlow was first signed by business magnate Howard Hughes, who directed her first major role in Hell's Angels (1930). After a series of critically failed films, and Hughes' loss of interest in her career, Metro-Goldwyn-Mayer bought out Harlow's contract in 1932 and cast her in leading roles in a string of hits built on her comedic talent: Red-Headed Woman (1932), Red Dust (1932), Dinner at Eight (1933), Reckless (1935), and Suzy (1936). Harlow's popularity rivaled and then surpassed that of MGM's top leading ladies Joan Crawford, Greta Garbo, and Norma Shearer. She died at the age of 26 of kidney failure while filming Saratoga. MGM completed the film using body doubles and released it less than two months after her death; it became the highest-grossing film of 1937, and the highest-grossing film of her career.

== Life and career ==
=== 1911–1925: Early life and education ===
Harlow was born Harlean Harlow Carpenter in a house located at 3344 Olive Street in Kansas City, Missouri.

Her father, Mont Clair Carpenter (1877–1974), son of Abraham L. Carpenter and Dianna (née Beal), was a dentist who attended dental school in Kansas City. He was from a working-class background. Her mother, Jean Poe Carpenter (née Harlow; 1891–1958), was the daughter of wealthy real estate broker Skip Harlow and his wife, Ella Harlow (née Williams). In 1908, Skip Harlow arranged his daughter's marriage to Mont Clair Carpenter. She was underage at the time and grew resentful and unhappy in the marriage, but the Carpenters remained together, living in a Kansas City house owned by her father.

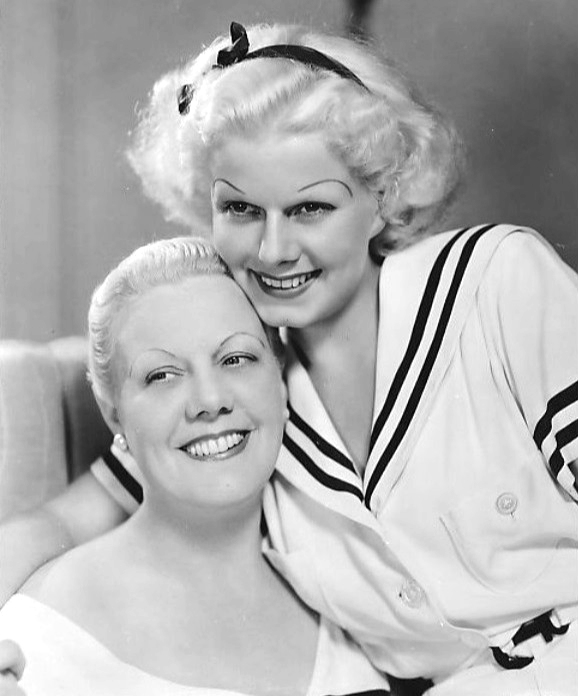
Harlow with her mother in 1934

Harlow's family called her "Baby," a nickname she was accustomed to and which endured for the rest of her life. It was not until she was five years old that she learned her real name was Harlean, when the staff and students at Miss Barstow's Finishing School for Girls used the name. Harlow was always very close to her mother, who was extremely protective. Her mother reportedly told her daughter that she owed everything she had to her; "She was always all mine!", Mama Jean said of her daughter in interviews. Jean Carpenter was later known as "Mama Jean" after Harlow achieved star status as Jean Harlow.

When Harlow was finishing school, her mother filed for a divorce. On September 29, 1922, the uncontested divorce was finalized, giving sole custody of Harlow to her mother. Although Harlow loved her father, she did not see him often after the divorce.

In 1923, the 32-year-old Jean Carpenter took her daughter and moved to Hollywood in hopes of becoming an actress, but was told that she was too old to begin a film career. Harlow was enrolled at the Hollywood School for Girls, where she met Douglas Fairbanks Jr., Joel McCrea, and Irene Mayer Selznick, but dropped out at the age of 14, in the spring of 1925.

With their finances dwindling, Jean and Harlow moved back to Kansas City after Skip Harlow issued an ultimatum that he would disinherit his daughter if they did not return. Several weeks later, Skip sent his granddaughter to summer camp at Camp Cha-Ton-Ka, in Michigamme, Michigan, where she contracted scarlet fever. Jean Carpenter traveled to Michigan to care for Harlow, rowing herself across the lake to the camp, but was told that she could not see her daughter.

Harlow next attended the Ferry Hall School (now Lake Forest Academy) in Lake Forest, Illinois. Jean Carpenter had an ulterior motive for her daughter's attendance at this particular school: It was close to the Chicago home of her boyfriend, Marino Bello.

Harlow enjoyed cooking, and a few of her recipes were published in newspapers and in Motion Picture magazine.

=== 1926–1928: First marriage ===
During Harlow's freshman year at the school, she was paired with a "big sister" from the senior class who introduced her to 19-year-old Charles "Chuck" Fremont McGrew III, an heir to a large fortune. By the fall of 1926, Harlow and Chuck were dating seriously, and they were married in 1928. Jean Carpenter was also married to Marino Bello on January 18; however, Harlow did not attend her mother's wedding.

In 1928, two months after the wedding, Chuck McGrew turned 21 and received part of his inheritance. The couple left Chicago and moved to Los Angeles, settling into a home in Beverly Hills, where Harlow thrived as a wealthy socialite. McGrew hoped to distance Harlow from her mother with the move. Neither Chuck nor Harlow worked during this time, and both were considered heavy drinkers.

=== 1928–1929: Career beginnings ===
While living in Los Angeles, Harlow befriended a young aspiring actress named Rosalie Roy. Not owning a car herself, Rosalie asked Harlow to drive her to Fox Studios for an appointment. While waiting for Rosalie, Harlow was noticed and approached by Fox executives, whom she told she was not interested. Nevertheless, she was given letters of introduction to Central Casting. A few days later, Rosalie Roy bet Harlow that she did not have the nerve to go in for an audition. Unwilling to lose a wager and pressed by her enthusiastic mother, who had followed her daughter to Los Angeles by this time, Harlow went to Central Casting and signed in under her mother's maiden name, Jean Harlow.

After several calls from casting and several job offers that Harlow rejected, Mother Jean finally persuaded her into accepting work at the studio. Harlow appeared in her first film, Honor Bound (1928), as an unbilled "extra" for $7 a day (equivalent to approximately $131 in 2025 dollars) and a box lunch, common pay for such work. This led to a wage increase to $10 per day and small parts in feature films such as Moran of the Marines (1928) and the Charley Chase lost film Chasing Husbands (1928). In December 1928, Harlow, as Jean Harlow, signed a five-year contract with Hal Roach Studios for $100 per week. She had small roles in the 1929 Laurel and Hardy shorts: Double Whoopee, Liberty and Bacon Grabbers, the last giving her a costarring credit.

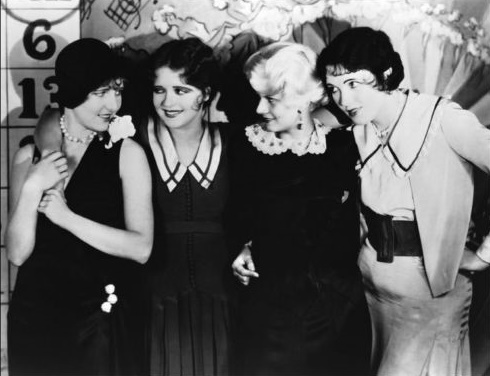
Jean Arthur, Clara Bow, Harlow, and Leone Lane in The Saturday Night Kid, in which Harlow had her first speaking part

In March 1929, she parted with Hal Roach, who tore up her contract after Harlow told him, "It's breaking up my marriage, what can I do?" In June 1929, Harlow separated from her husband, who disapproved of her career, and moved in with Mother Jean and Bello. After her separation from McGrew, Harlow continued working as an "extra" in such films as This Thing Called Love, Close Harmony, and The Love Parade (all 1929), until she landed her first speaking role in the Clara Bow film The Saturday Night Kid. Harlow and her husband divorced in 1929.

=== 1929–1932: Breakthrough ===
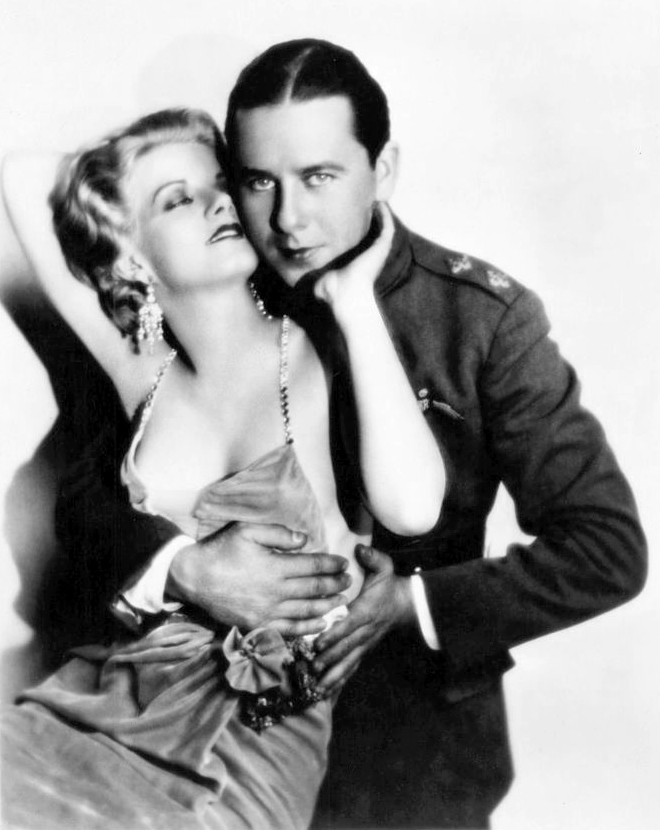
Harlow and Ben Lyon in Hell's Angels (1930), her first major film appearance

In late 1929, Harlow was spotted by Ben Lyon, an actor filming Howard Hughes' Hell's Angels. Another account gives cameraman Arthur Landau credit for spotting Harlow and suggesting her to Hughes. Hughes was reshooting most of his originally silent film with sound and needed an actress to replace Greta Nissen, whose Norwegian accent was undesirable for her character. Harlow made a screen test for Hughes, who cast her in the part. On October 24, 1929, Harlow signed a five-year contract with Hughes worth $100 per week (equivalent to approximately $1,875 in 2025 dollars).

During filming of Hells Angels, Harlow met MGM executive Paul Bern, her future husband, for the first time.

Hell's Angels premiered in Hollywood at Grauman's Chinese Theatre on May 27, 1930, and became the highest-grossing film of that year, besting even Greta Garbo's talkie debut in Anna Christie. Hell's Angels made Harlow an international star. Though she was popular with audiences, the critics were less than enthusiastic. The New Yorker called her performance "plain awful," though Variety magazine conceded, "It doesn't matter what degree of talent she possesses ... nobody ever starved possessing what she's got."

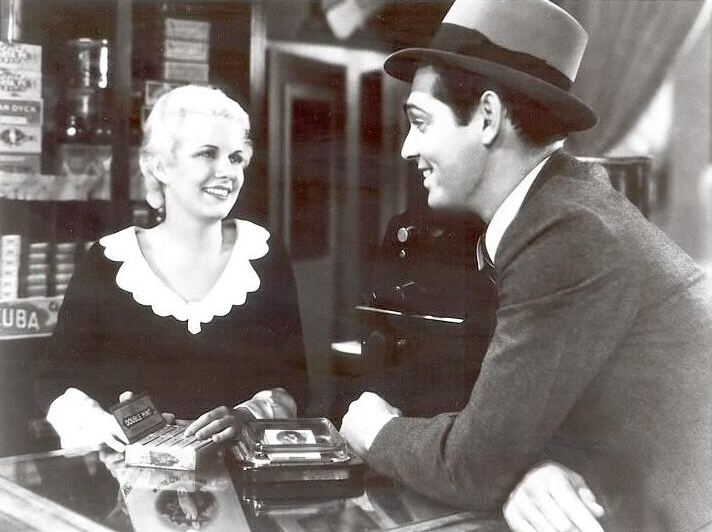
Harlow and Clark Gable in The Secret Six (1931)

In spite of her relative success with Hell's Angels, Harlow again found herself in the role of "uncredited extra" in the Charlie Chaplin film City Lights (1931), though her appearance did not make the final cut. With no other projects planned for Harlow at the time, Hughes decided to send her to New York, Seattle, and Kansas City for premieres of Hell's Angels. In 1931, his Caddo Company loaned her out to other studios to make films. She appeared in MGM's The Secret Six (1931), starring Wallace Beery, which also marked her first on-screen pairing with Clark Gable. This was followed by The Public Enemy (1931) for Warner Brothers, a classic pre-Code gangster film that paired her with James Cagney. She would also make Iron Man (1931) with Lew Ayres for Universal, and play the title role in Fox's Goldie (1931), co-starring Spencer Tracy. These films enjoyed varying degrees of success with audiences, while Harlow's acting was universally panned by critics.

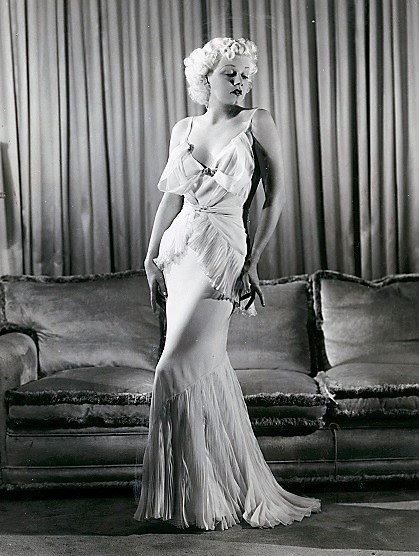
Harlow in 1930

Harlow briefly dated gangster Abner Zwillman, who bought her a jeweled bracelet and a red Cadillac, and made a large cash loan to studio head Harry Cohn to obtain a two-picture deal for her at Columbia Pictures. The relationship ended when he reportedly referred to her in derogatory and vulgar terms when speaking to other associated crime figures, as revealed in secret surveillance recordings.

Columbia Pictures first cast Harlow in a Frank Capra film with Loretta Young, originally titled Gallagher for Young's lead character but renamed Platinum Blonde to capitalize on Hughes' publicity of Harlow's "platinum" hair color. Though Harlow denied her hair was bleached, the platinum blonde color was reportedly achieved with a weekly application of ammonia, Clorox bleach, and Lux soap flakes. This process weakened and damaged Harlow's naturally ash-blonde hair. Many female fans began dyeing their hair to match hers, and Hughes' team organized a series of "Platinum Blonde" clubs across the nation offering a prize of $10,000 to any beautician who could match Harlow's shade. No one could, and the prize went unclaimed, but the publicity scheme worked, and the "Platinum Blonde" nickname stuck with Harlow. Her second film for that studio was Three Wise Girls (1932), with Mae Clarke and Walter Byron, in which she was top billed for the first time.

Paul Bern then arranged with Hughes to borrow her for MGM's The Beast of the City (1932), co-starring Walter Huston. After filming, Bern booked a ten-week personal appearance tour on the East Coast. To the surprise of many, especially Harlow herself, she packed every theater in which she appeared, often appearing in a single venue for several nights. Despite critical disparagement and poor roles, Harlow's popularity and following were large and growing, and in February 1932, the tour was extended by six weeks.

According to Fay Wray, who played Ann Darrow in RKO's King Kong (1933), Harlow was the original choice to play the screaming blonde heroine, but was under an exclusive contract with MGM during the film's pre-production phase—and the part went to Wray, a brunette who had to wear a blonde wig.

When mobster Benjamin "Bugsy" Siegel came to Hollywood to expand casino operations, Harlow became the informal godmother of Siegel's eldest daughter, Millicent, when the family lived in Beverly Hills.

=== 1932–1937: Stardom at MGM ===
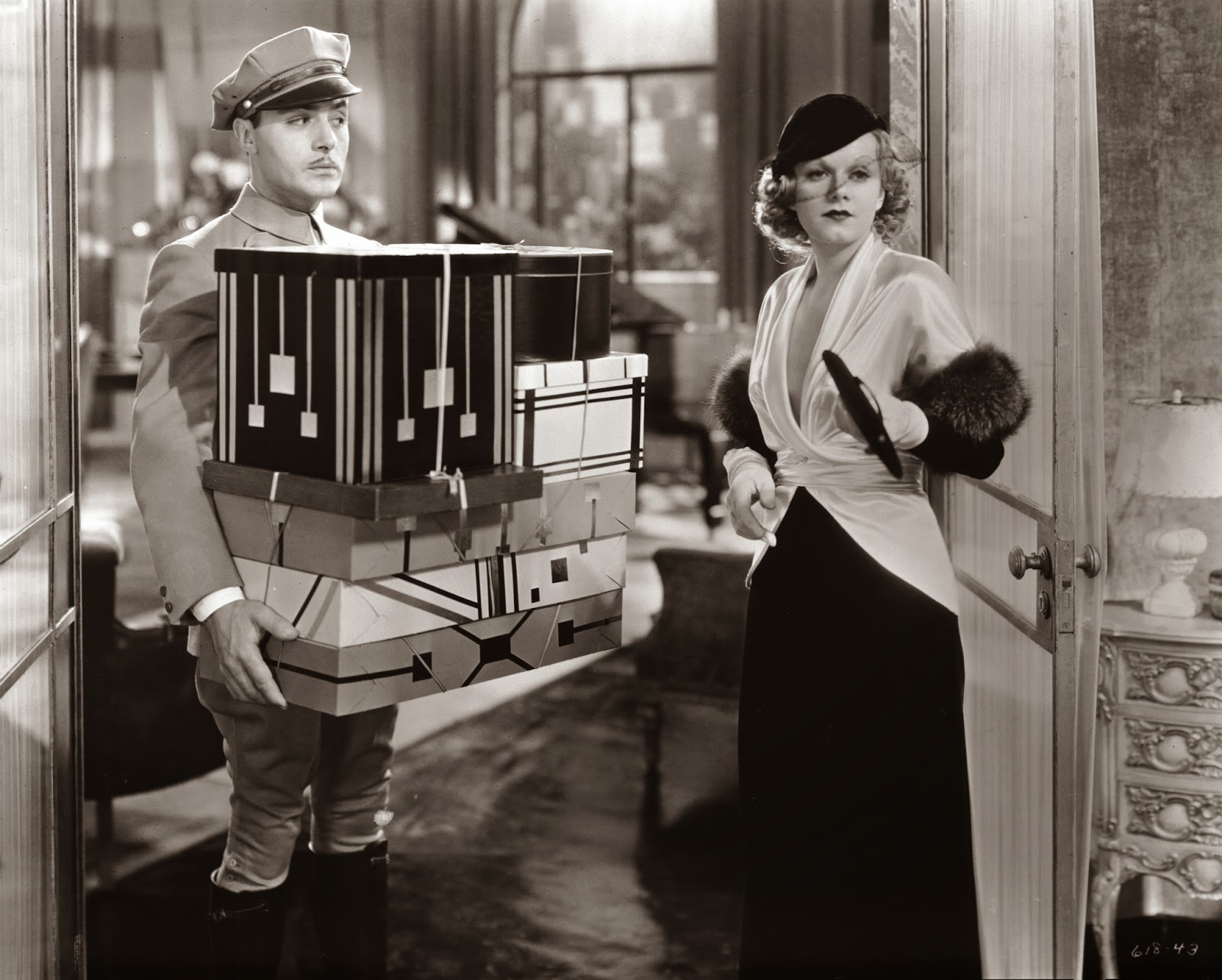
Harlow received recognition as an actress in Red-Headed Woman (1932), her first MGM film; she wore a red wig for the role.

Paul Bern was now romantically involved with Harlow and spoke to Louis B. Mayer about buying her contract with Hughes and signing her to Metro-Goldwyn-Mayer, but Mayer declined. MGM's leading ladies were presented as elegant, whereas Harlow's "floozy" screen persona was not looked upon favorably by Mayer. Bern then began urging close friend Irving Thalberg, production head of MGM, to sign Harlow, noting her popularity and established image. After initial reluctance, Thalberg agreed, and on March 3, 1932, Harlow's 21st birthday, Bern called her with the news that MGM had purchased her contract from Hughes for $30,000, equal to $707,927 today. Harlow officially joined the studio on April 20, 1932.

At MGM, Harlow was given leading movie roles to show off her looks and nascent comedic talent. Though her screen persona changed dramatically during her career, one constant was her sense of humor. In 1932, she starred in the comedy Red-Headed Woman for which she received $1,250 a week. It was the first film in which she "resembles something of an actress," portraying a woman who is successful at being amoral, in a film that neither moralizes nor punishes her behavior. The film is often noted as being one of the few films in which Harlow did not appear with platinum blonde hair; she wore a red wig for the role. While Harlow was filming Red-Headed Woman, actress Anita Page passed her on the studio lot without acknowledging her. She later told Page that the snub had caused her to cry until she saw herself, noticed the red wig, and burst out laughing when she realized Page had not recognized her. "That shows you how sensitive she was," Page said. "She was a lovely person in so many ways."

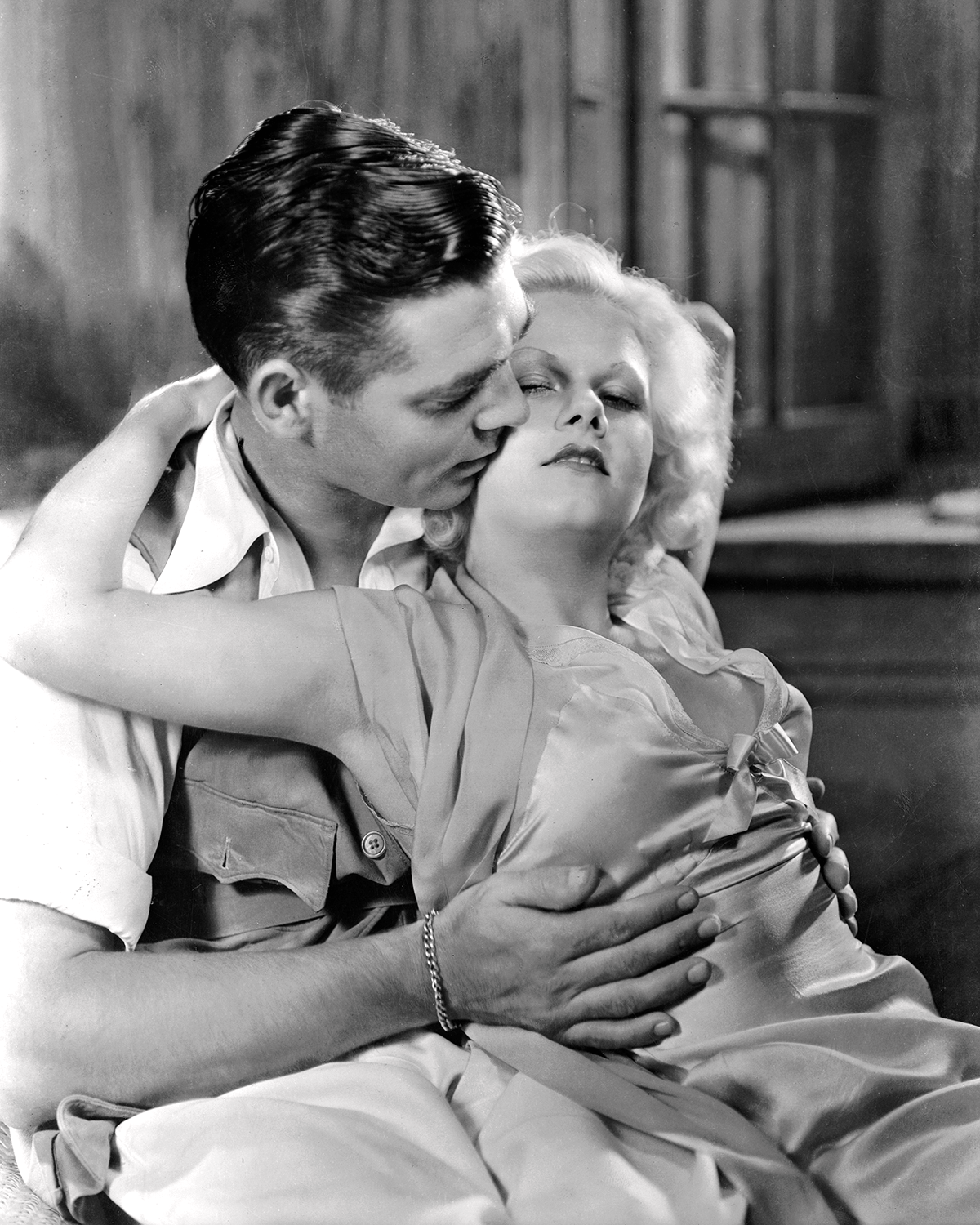
Harlow with Clark Gable in Red Dust (1932)

She next starred in Red Dust (1932), her second film with Clark Gable. Harlow and Gable collaborated and co-starred in six films. She was also paired multiple times with Spencer Tracy and William Powell. MGM began trying to distinguish Harlow's public persona from her screen characters by putting out press releases that her childhood surname was not the common "Carpenter" but the chic "Carpentiér", claiming that writer Edgar Allan Poe was one of her ancestors and publishing photographs of her doing charity work to change her image to that of an All-American woman. This transformation proved difficult; once, Harlow was heard muttering, "My God, must I always wear a low-cut dress to be important?"

During the making of Red Dust, Bern—her husband of two months—was found dead at their home; this created a lasting scandal. Initially, Harlow was suspected of killing Bern, but his death was officially ruled a suicide by self-inflicted gunshot wound. Louis B. Mayer feared negative publicity from the incident and intended to replace Harlow in the film, offering the role to Tallulah Bankhead. Bankhead was appalled by the offer and wrote in her autobiography, "To damn the radiant Jean for the misfortune of another would be one of the shabbiest acts of all time. I told Mr. Mayer as much." Harlow kept silent, survived the ordeal, and became more popular than ever. A 2009 biography of Bern asserted that Bern was, in fact, murdered by a former lover and the crime scene re-arranged by MGM executives to make it appear Bern had killed himself.

After Bern's death, Harlow began an indiscreet affair with boxer Max Baer, who, though separated from his wife Dorothy Dunbar, was threatened with divorce proceedings naming Harlow as a co-respondent for alienation of affection, a legal term for adultery. The affair resulted in Harlow becoming pregnant, which led her to get an abortion to avoid further scandal. After Bern's death, the studio did not want another scandal and defused the situation by arranging a marriage between Harlow and cinematographer Harold Rosson. Rosson and Harlow were friends, and Rosson agreed with the plan. They quietly divorced eight months later.

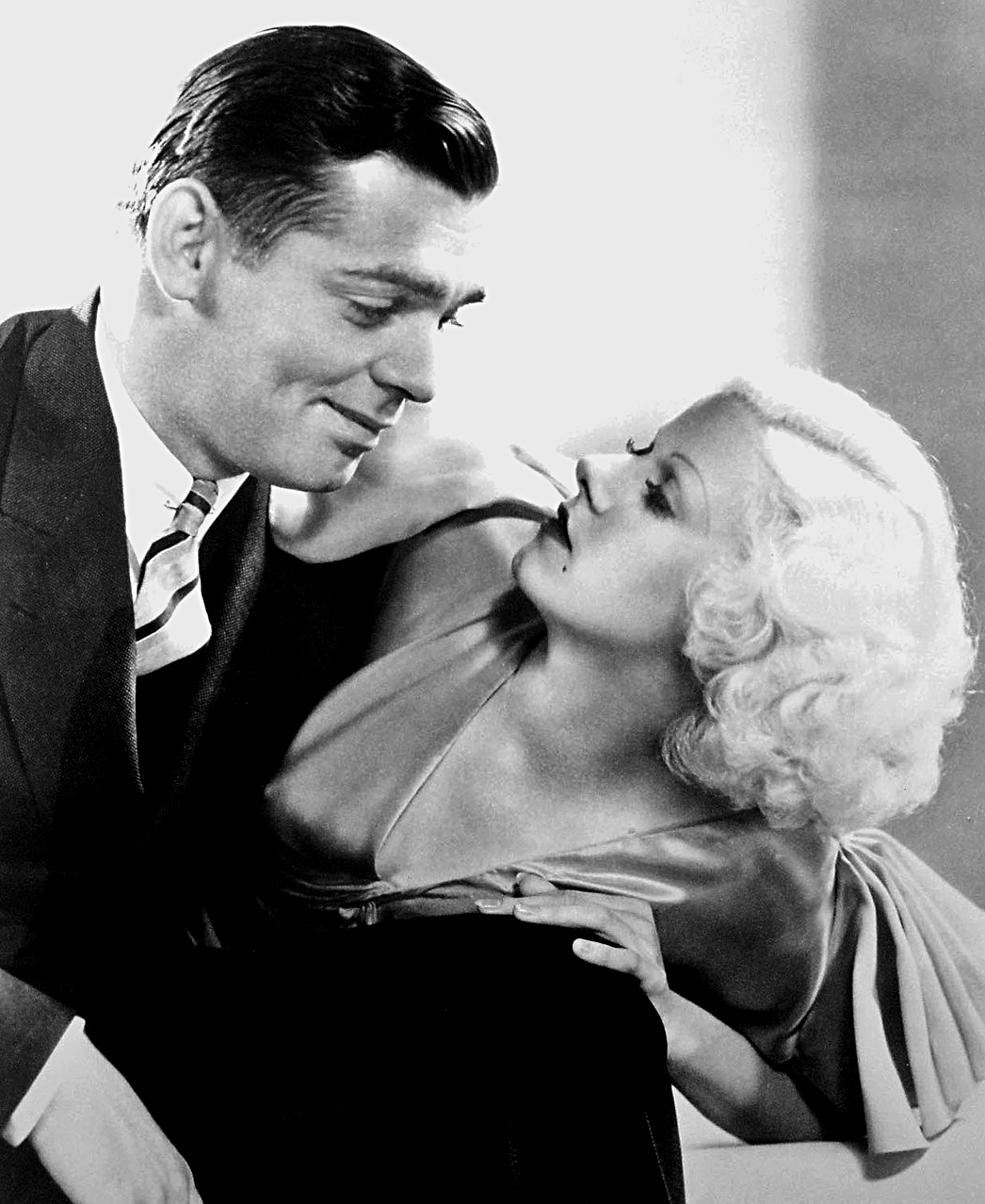
Harlow with Clark Gable in 1933's Hold Your Man, another successful film pairing of the two and box office success for MGM

MGM realized the box office value of the Harlow-Gable on-screen partnership following the audience response to Red Dust. The studio paired them together again in the romantic drama Hold Your Man (1933), another box office hit, this time with Harlow receiving top billing over Gable. Harlow then played the adulterous wife of Wallace Beery in George Cukor's Dinner at Eight (1933), an all-star comedy-drama that also featured Marie Dressler, John Barrymore, Lionel Barrymore, and Billie Burke. Harlow then played a pressured and overworked Hollywood film star in the screwball comedy Bombshell (1933), directed by Victor Fleming, and co-starring Lee Tracy and Franchot Tone. The film drew inspiration from the life of Clara Bow as well as Harlow's own personal and professional lives.

The following year, she was teamed with Lionel Barrymore and Franchot Tone in The Girl from Missouri (1934). The film was the MGM's first attempt to soften Harlow's image, but it faced censorship restrictions, so much so that its original title, Born to Be Kissed, had to be changed. There were other changes also made to the script, and censorship would continue to shape the remainder of Harlow's screen career.

Harlow would complete two more productions with Gable. The adventure film China Seas (1935) would also co-star Wallace Beery and Rosalind Russell, and the romantic comedy Wife vs. Secretary (1936) paired the duo with Myrna Loy and James Stewart. Stewart later spoke of a scene in a car with Harlow in Wife vs. Secretary, saying, "Clarence Brown, the director, wasn't too pleased by the way I did the smooching. He made us repeat the scene about half a dozen times ... I botched it up on purpose. That Jean Harlow sure was a good kisser. I realized that, until then, I had never been really kissed."

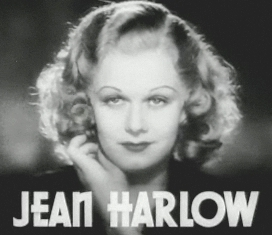
Harlow in a trailer for Riffraff (1936)

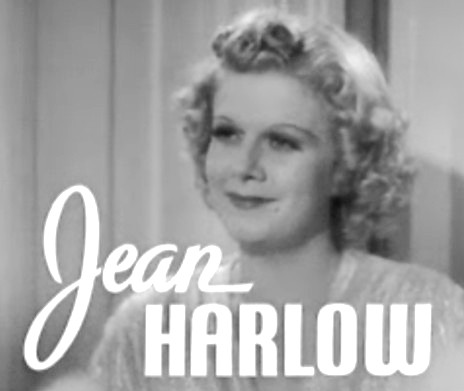
Harlow in a trailer for Libeled Lady (1936)

Harlow was consistently voted one of the strongest box office draws in the United States from 1933 onward, often outranking her female colleagues at MGM in audience popularity polls. By the mid-1930s, she was one of the biggest stars in the United States, and, it was hoped, MGM's next Greta Garbo. Still young, her star continued to rise while the popularity of other female stars at MGM, such as Garbo, Joan Crawford, and Norma Shearer, waned. Harlow's films continued to make huge profits at the box office even during the Great Depression.

After her third marriage ended in 1934, Harlow met William Powell, another MGM star, and quickly fell in love. The couple were reportedly engaged for two years, but differences that ranged from past marriages to Powell's uncertainty about the future, kept them from publicly formalizing their relationship. Harlow became pregnant by Powell in 1936, but he refused to marry her. Howard Strickling, MGM's head of publicity, who was notorious for arranging abortions for Hollywood stars, checked Harlow into Good Shepherd Hospital under the name "Mrs. Jean Carpenter," where she underwent her second abortion. The two co-starred in her next film Reckless (1935), her first and only movie musical. Considering Harlow was not a trained singer, her songs in the film were dubbed by vocalist Virginia Verrill. The film performed well at the box office, but was not well-reviewed by critics.

Harlow next starred in Suzy (1936), where she played the title role, giving her top billing over four-time co-star Franchot Tone and Cary Grant. While critics noted that Harlow dominated the film, it was only a reasonable box office success. She then made Riffraff (1936), a financial disappointment that co-starred Spencer Tracy and Una Merkel. This was followed by Libeled Lady (1936), in which she was top-billed over William Powell, Myrna Loy, and Spencer Tracy. The film was an international success, and is widely considered a screwball comedy classic. She then filmed W.S. Van Dyke's comedy Personal Property (1937), co-starring Robert Taylor. It was Harlow's final completed film.

== Illness and death ==
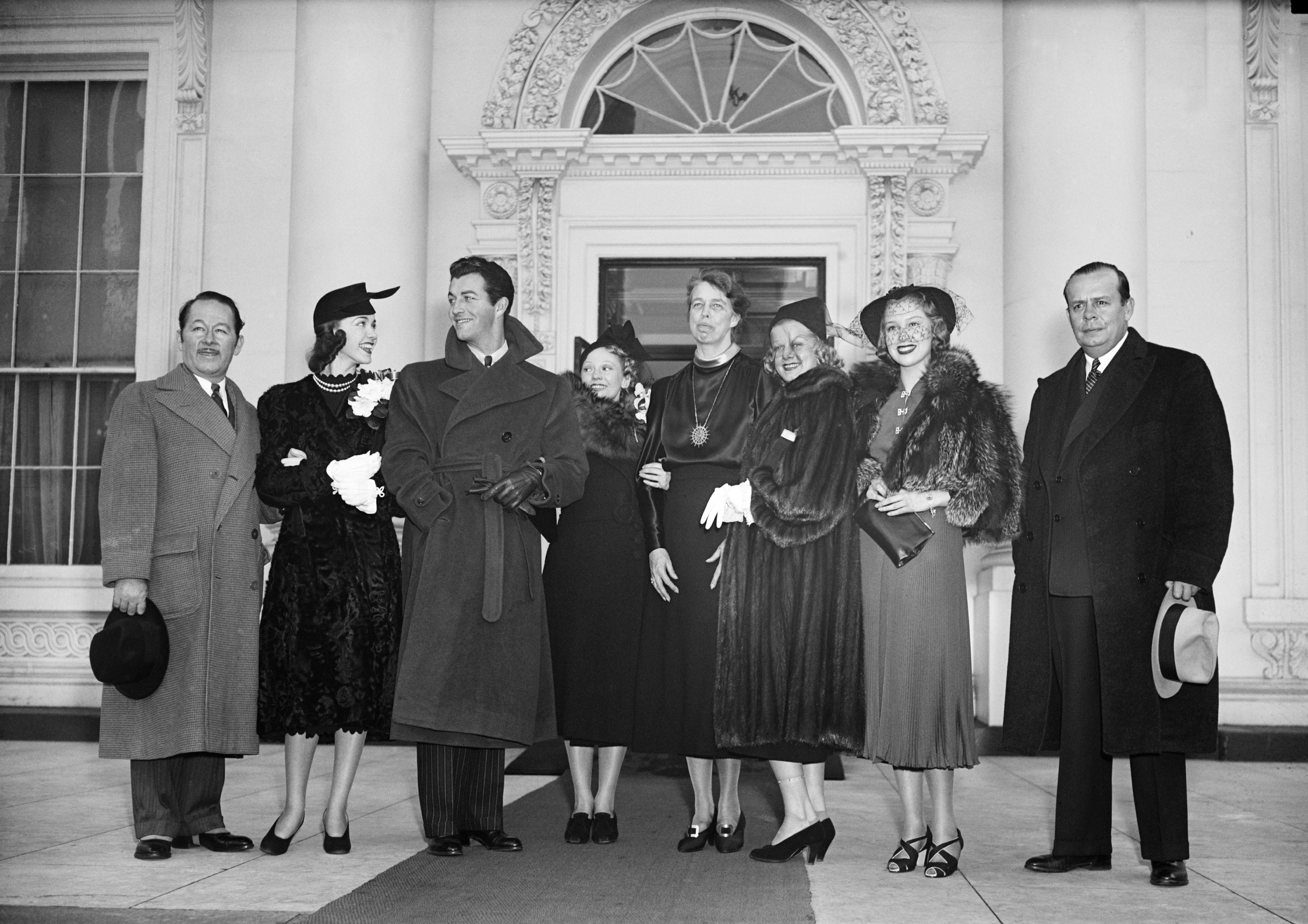
Harlow, third from right, stands beside Eleanor Roosevelt with other invited celebrities after the President's Birthday Ball luncheon at the White House, 30 January 1937.

In January 1937, Harlow and Robert Taylor traveled to Washington, DC, to take part in fundraising activities associated with Franklin D. Roosevelt's birthday, for the organization later known as the March of Dimes. Harlow, a Democrat, had campaigned for Roosevelt in the 1936 United States presidential election, and two years earlier for Upton Sinclair in the 1934 California gubernatorial election. The trip was physically taxing for Harlow, and she contracted influenza. She recovered in time to attend the Academy Awards ceremony with William Powell.

Filming for Harlow's final film, Saratoga, co-starring Clark Gable, was scheduled to begin in March 1937. However, production was delayed when she developed sepsis after a multiple extraction of her wisdom teeth, and had to be hospitalized. Almost two months later, Harlow recovered, and shooting began on April 22, 1937. She also appeared on the May 3 cover of Life in photographs by Martin Munkácsi.

On May 20, 1937, while filming Saratoga, Harlow began to complain of illness. Her symptoms—fatigue, nausea, fluid retention, and abdominal pain—did not seem very serious to the studio doctor, who believed that she was suffering from cholecystitis and influenza. The doctor was not aware that Harlow had been ill during the previous year with a severe sunburn and influenza. Friend and co-star Una Merkel noticed Harlow's on-set weight gain, gray pallor, and fatigue.

On May 29, while Harlow filmed a scene in which her character had a fever, she was clearly sicker than her character and leaned against her co-star Gable between takes and said, "I feel terrible! Get me back to my dressing room." She requested that the assistant director telephone William Powell, who immediately left his own movie set, to escort her home.

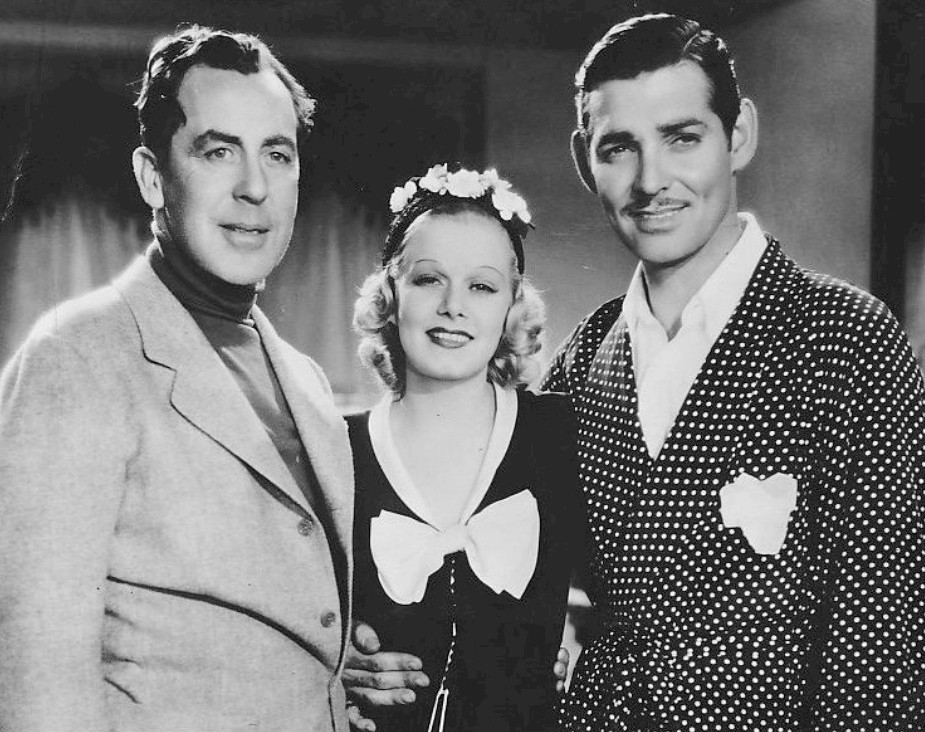
This photo with director Jack Conway and Clark Gable on the set of Saratoga, was taken days before Harlow's collapse and issued at the time her death was announced.

The next day, Powell examined Harlow and discovered that her condition had not improved. He contacted her mother and insisted that she cut her holiday short to be at her daughter's side. Powell also summoned a doctor. Because Harlow's previous illnesses had delayed the shooting of three movies (Wife vs. Secretary, Suzy, and Libeled Lady), initially, concern was not great regarding this latest bout with a recurring illness. On June 2, it was announced she was again suffering from influenza. Ernest Fishbaugh, who had been called to Harlow's home to treat her, diagnosed her with an inflamed gallbladder. Mother Jean told MGM that Harlow was feeling better on June 3, and co-workers expected her back on the set by Monday, June 7, 1937. Press reports were contradictory, with headlines reading "Jean Harlow seriously ill" and "Harlow recovers from illness crisis". When she did not return to set, a concerned Gable visited her and later remarked that she was severely bloated and that he smelled urine on her breath when he kissed her—both signs of kidney failure.

Leland Chapman, a colleague of Fishbaugh's, was consulted to give a second opinion on Harlow's condition. Chapman recognized that she was not suffering from an inflamed gallbladder, but was in the final stages of kidney failure. On June 6, 1937, Harlow said that she could not see Powell clearly and could not tell how many fingers he was holding up.

That evening, she was taken to Good Samaritan Hospital in Los Angeles, where she slipped into a coma. The next day at 11:37 am, Harlow died in the hospital at the age of 26. In the doctor's press releases, the cause of death was given as cerebral edema, a complication of kidney failure. Hospital records mention uremia.

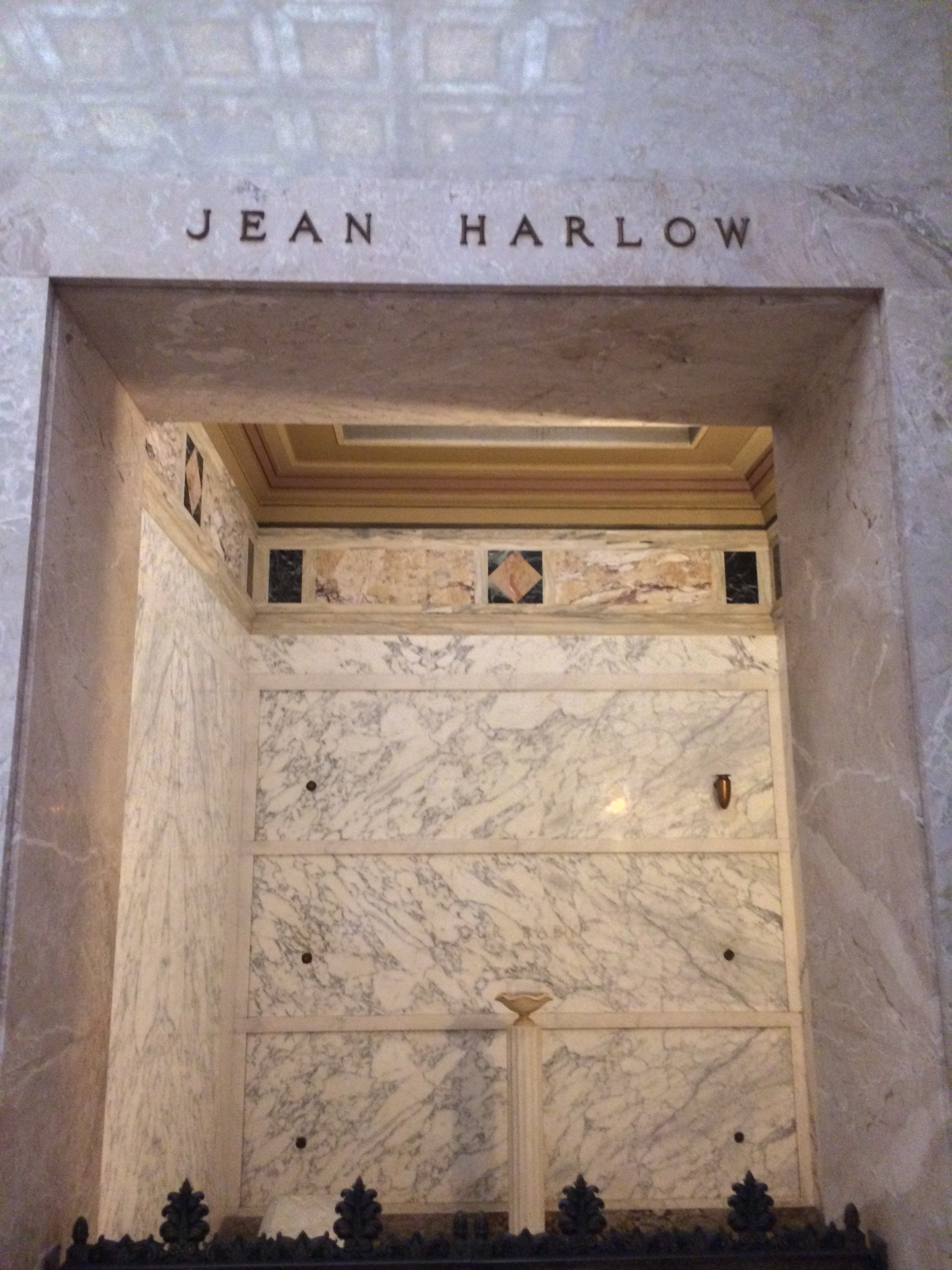
The Jean Harlow grave in the Great Mausoleum at Forest Lawn Glendale – her middle crypt reads "Our Baby"

For years, rumors circulated about Harlow's death. Some claimed that her mother had refused to call a doctor because she was a Christian Scientist or that Harlow had declined hospital treatment or surgery. From the onset of her illness, however, Harlow had been attended by a doctor while she was resting at home. Two nurses also visited her house, and various equipment was brought from a nearby hospital. Harlow's grayish complexion, recurring illnesses, and severe sunburn were signs of the disease. Toxins also adversely affected her brain and central nervous system.

Harlow suffered from scarlet fever when she was 15. Some have speculated that she suffered a poststreptococcal glomerulonephritis following the incident, which may have caused high blood pressure and ultimately kidney failure. Her death certificate lists the cause of death as "acute respiratory infection", "acute nephritis", and "uremia".

One MGM writer later said, "The day Baby died...there wasn't one sound in the commissary for three hours." Frequent co-star Spencer Tracy wrote in his diary, "Jean Harlow died. Grand girl."

Her funeral was held on June 9, 1937, in the Wee Kirk o' the Heather chapel in Forest Lawn Memorial Park in Glendale, California, and she was interred in the park's Great Mausoleum in a private room of multicolored marble, which William Powell bought for $25,000 (equivalent to approximately $559,896 in 2025 dollars). She was laid to rest in the pink negligee she had worn in Saratoga and in her hands she had a white gardenia along with a note that Powell had written: "Goodnight, my dearest darling." Her bronze casket was reported to have cost $5,000 (equivalent to approximately $111,979 in 2025 dollars). Harlow's inscription on her crypt reads, "Our Baby".

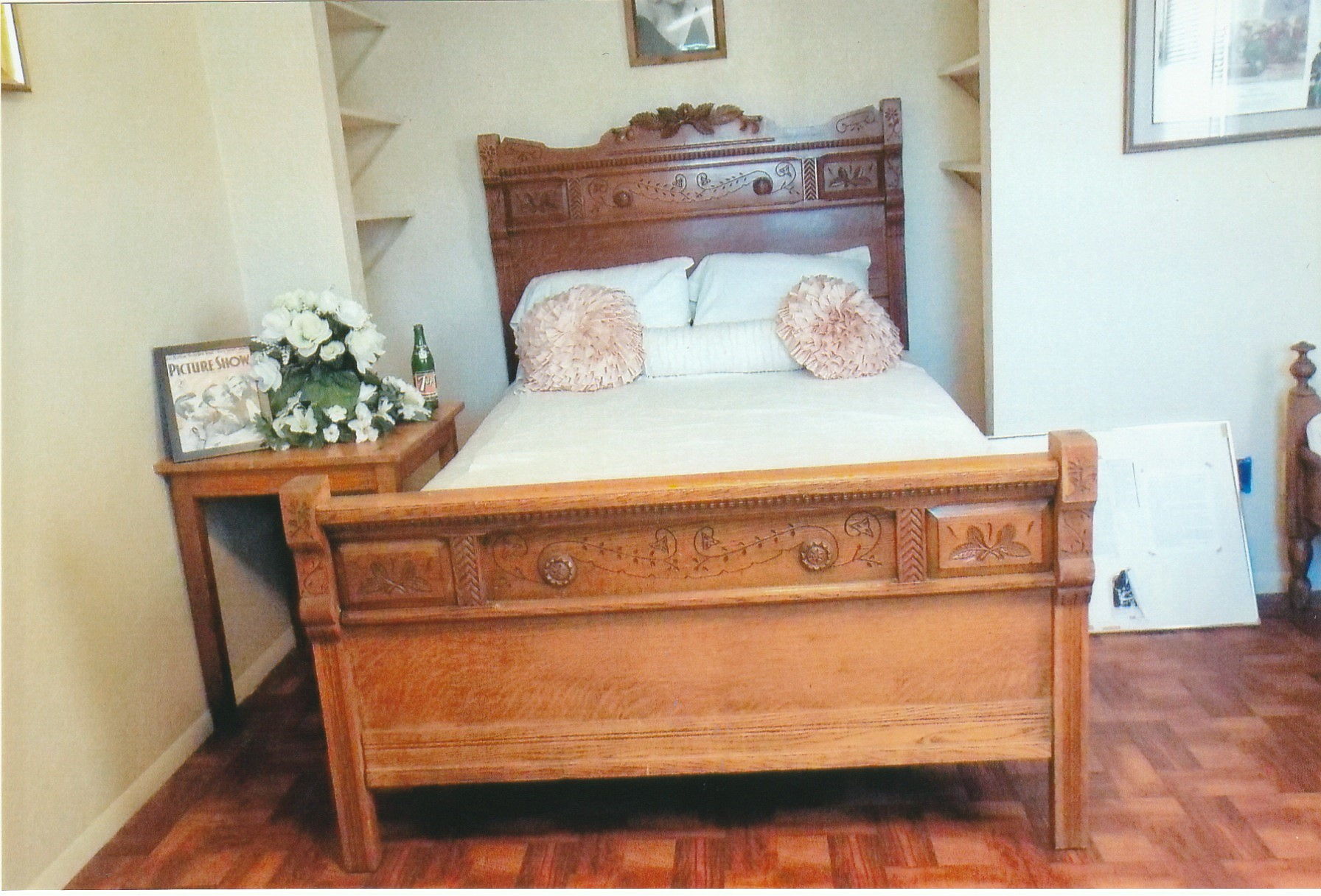
Harlow's bed in the Jean Harlow Museum in Black Canyon City, Arizona

Spaces in the same room were reserved for Harlow's mother and Powell. Harlow's mother was buried there in 1958, but Powell married actress Diana Lewis in 1940. After his death in 1984, he was cremated and his ashes buried in Desert Memorial Park in Cathedral City, California.

MGM planned to replace Harlow in Saratoga with either Jean Arthur or Virginia Bruce, but because of public objections, the film was finished using three doubles (Mary Dees for close-ups, Geraldine Dvorak for long shots, and Paula Winslowe for dubbing Harlow's lines) and rewriting some scenes without her. The movie had almost finished filming, so doubles were only needed for about 4 minutes of footage. The film was released on July 23, 1937, less than two months after Harlow's death, and was a hit with audiences, grossing $3.3 million in worldwide rentals and becoming the highest-grossing film of the year, as well as the highest-grossing film of Jean Harlow's career.

== Legacy ==
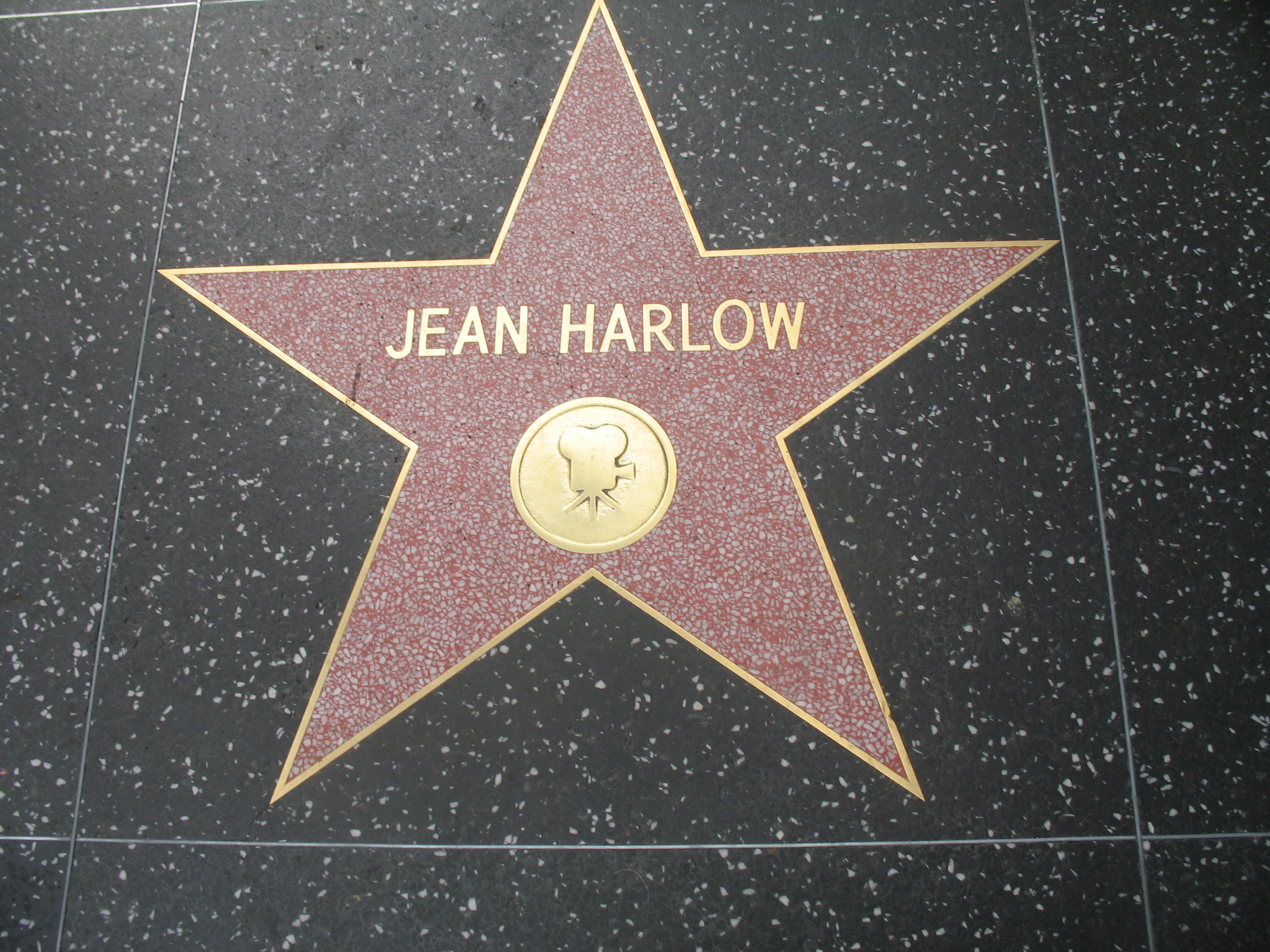
Harlow's star on the Hollywood Walk of Fame

According to Camille Paglia, the notion that blondes have more fun was started in Hollywood by Harlow. Paglia noted, "The woman who really started all this in Hollywood was Jean Harlow, with that platinum blonde look which was so incredibly unnatural. With her, it was associated with being a harlot — she was mimicking the slouchy, louche look of someone who's a machine for pleasure."

She is noted to have inspired Marilyn Monroe, Madonna, and others. Monroe, who idolized Harlow as a child, was planning to star in a biopic about Harlow but died before filming began.

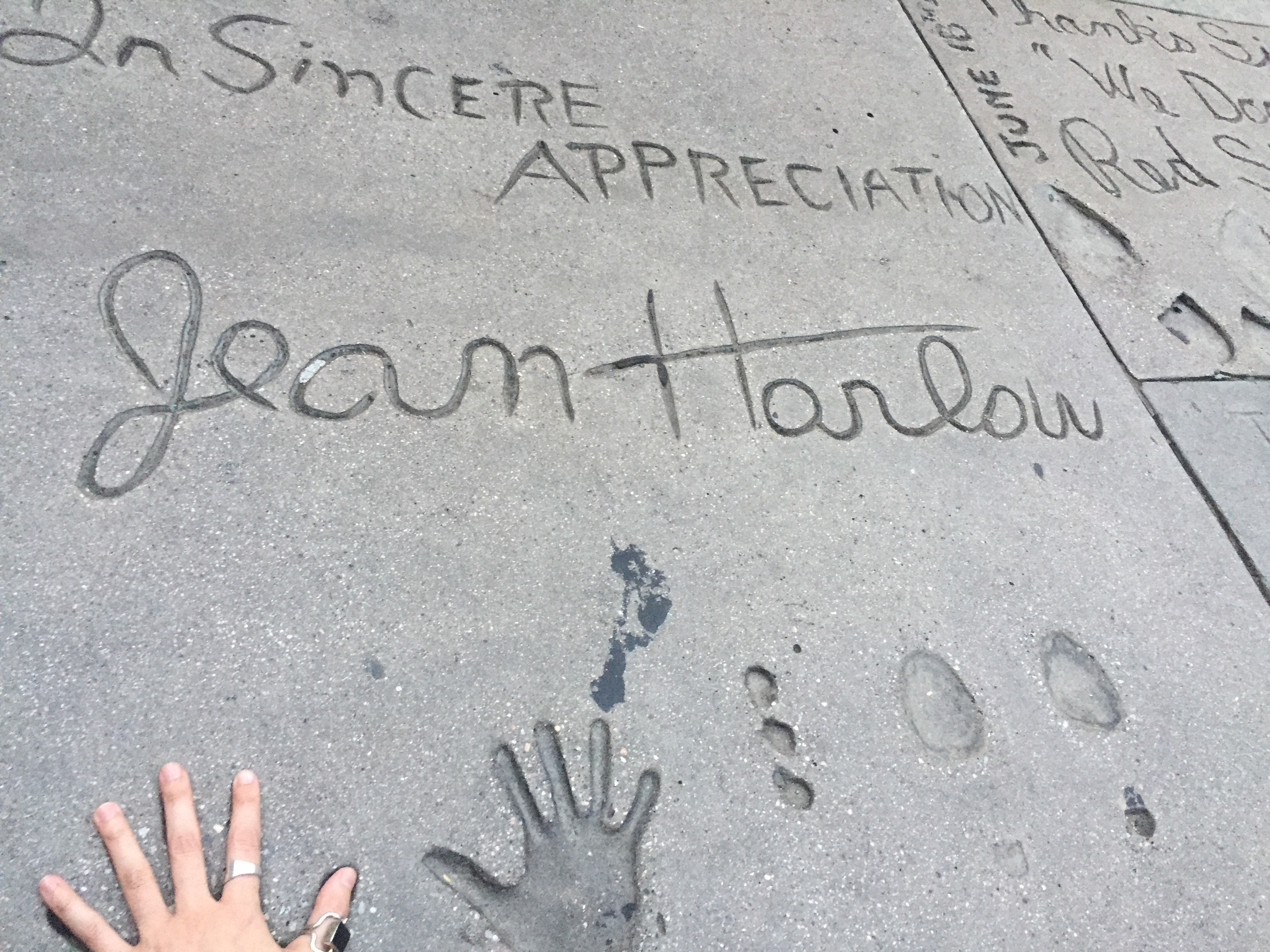
Harlow's signature, handprints, and footprints in the concrete in front of Grauman's Chinese Theatre in Los Angeles.

Her name was given to a cocktail, the "Jean Harlow", which is equal parts light rum and sweet vermouth.

Blues musician Lead Belly wrote the song "Jean Harlow" while in prison upon hearing about her death.

The French composer Charles Koechlin composed the piece Épitaphe de Jean Harlow (opus 164) in 1937.

On February 8, 1960, Jean Harlow was given a star on the Hollywood Walk of Fame located at 6910 Hollywood Boulevard on the south part of the Hollywood Boulevard in Los Angeles, California.

Kim Carnes's hit "Bette Davis Eyes" (1981) contains the line "her hair is Harlow gold."

Harlow's signature, hands, and footprints were imprinted in cement on September 29, 1933, in the 24th ceremony at Grauman's Chinese Theater and are located near the forecourt on the west side of the box office at 6925 Hollywood Boulevard, Hollywood, California.

== Novel ==
With the aid of the screenwriter Carey Wilson, Harlow wrote a novel titled Today Is Tonight. In Arthur Landau's introduction to the 1965 paperback edition, Harlow stated around 1933–1934 her intention to write the book, but it was not published during her lifetime. During her life, Harlow's stepfather, Marino Bello, shopped the unpublished manuscript to a few studios. Louis B. Mayer, head of MGM, prevented the book from being sold by putting an injunction on it using a clause in Harlow's contract: her services as an artist couldn't be used without MGM's permission. After her death, Landau wrote, her mother sold the film rights to MGM, though no film was made. The publication rights were passed from Harlow's mother to a family friend, and the book was finally published in 1965.

== Film portrayals ==
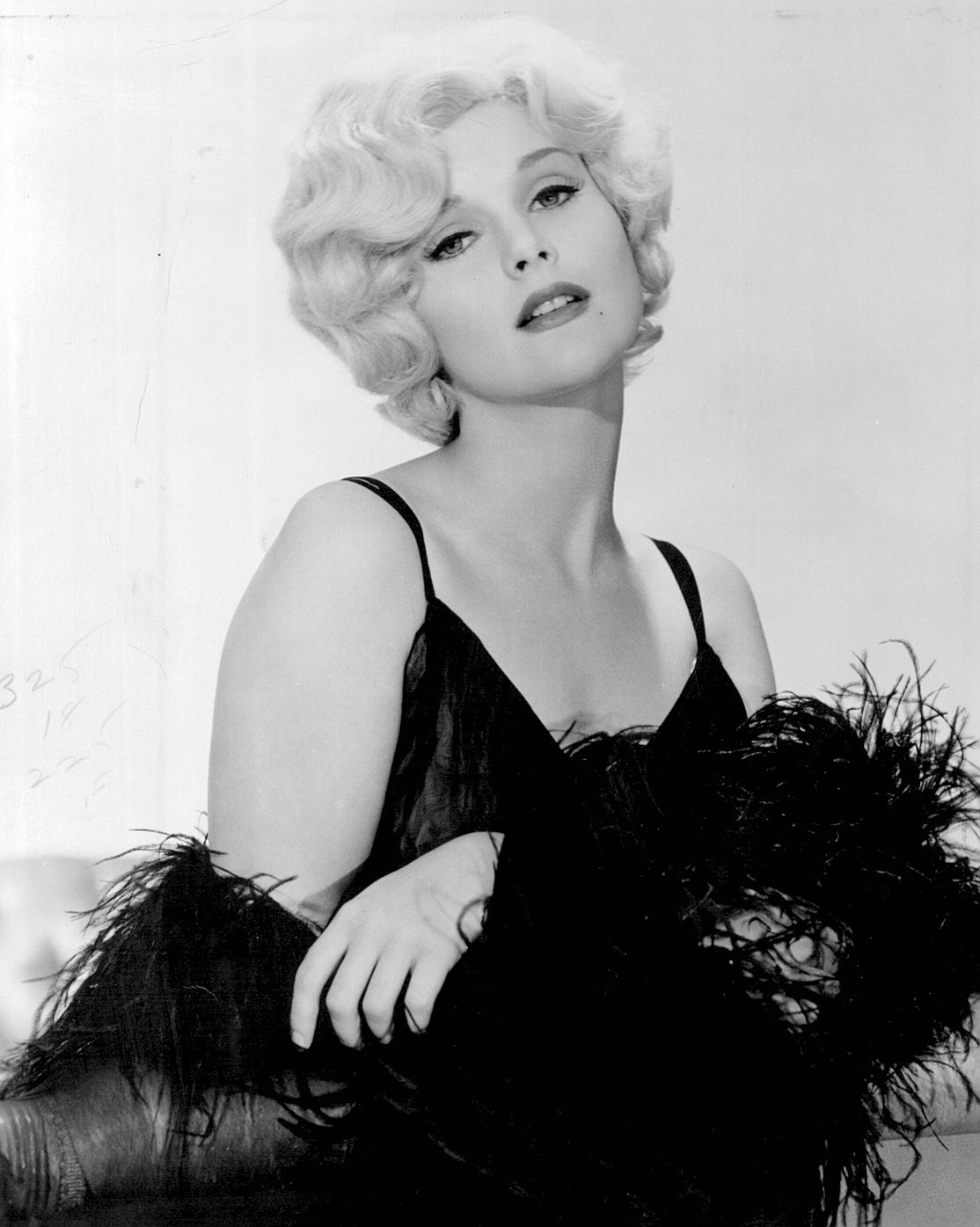
Carol Lynley as Harlow

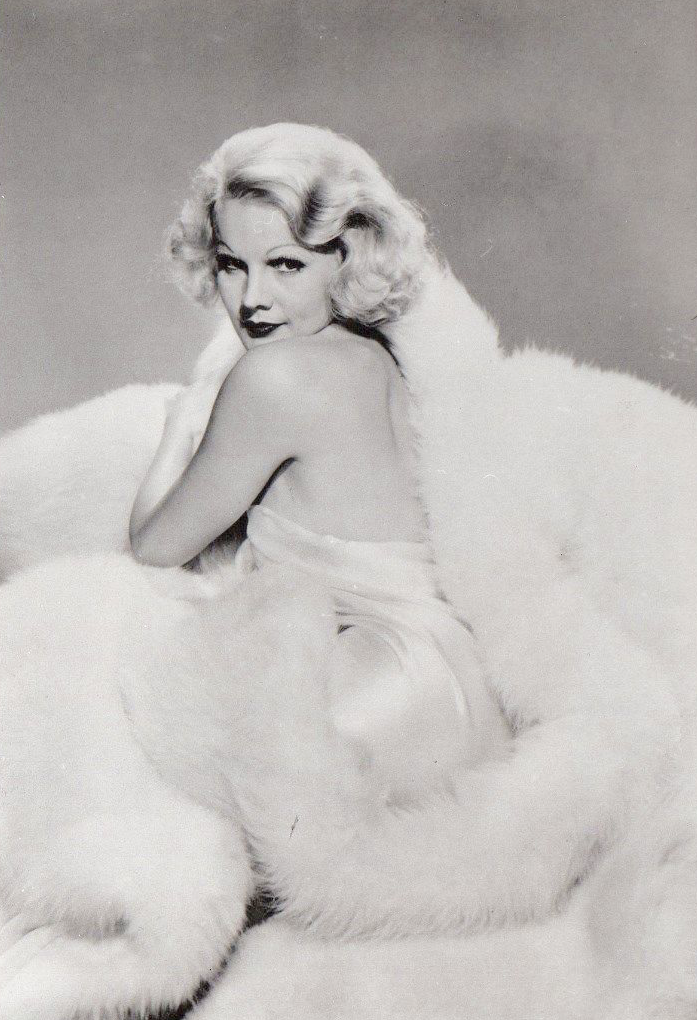
Carroll Baker as Harlow

Film adaptations of Harlow's life were considered at various points in the 1950s. Twentieth Century-Fox had slated Jayne Mansfield for the role, and ideas for Columbia Pictures actress Cleo Moore to play Harlow were also tabled. These projects never materialized. Marilyn Monroe was given a role for Harlow in 1953, but she declined it, feeling it was underdeveloped.

In 1964, Carroll Baker played a character loosely based on Harlow in The Carpetbaggers.

In 1965, two films about Jean Harlow were released, both titled Harlow. The first film was released by Magna Corporation in May 1965, and starred Carol Lynley. The second film was released in June 1965 by Paramount Pictures, and starred Carroll Baker. Both were poorly received and did not perform well at the box office.

In 1975, Roberta Collins played Harlow in the rhythm-and-blues band Bloodstone's pop musical movie Train Ride to Hollywood.

In 1978, Lindsay Bloom portrayed her in Hughes and Harlow: Angels in Hell.

In August 1993, Sharon Stone hosted a documentary about Harlow titled Harlow: The Blonde Bombshell, which aired on Turner Classic Movies.

In 2004, Gwen Stefani portrayed Harlow in Martin Scorsese's Howard Hughes biopic The Aviator.

== Sources ==
- Amburn, Ellis (September 1, 2018). Olivia de Havilland and the Golden Age of Hollywood. Rowman & Littlefield. ISBN 978-1-4930-3410-9.
- Ankerich, Michael G. (December 4, 2011). The Sound of Silence: Conversations with 16 Film and Stage Personalities (reprint ed.). Jefferson, NC: McFarland. p. 190. ISBN 978-0-7864-8534-5.
- Balio, Tino (March 14, 2018). MGM. Routledge. ISBN 978-1-3174-2967-8.
- Barlett, Donald L.; Steele, James B. (April 11, 2011). Howard Hughes: His Life and Madness. W. W. Norton & Company. ISBN 978-0-393-07858-9.
- Barlett, Donald L.; Steele, James B. (1979). Empire: The Life, Legend and Madness of Howard Hughes. W. W. Norton & Company. ISBN 978-0-3930-7513-7.
- Barnes, Noble (2004). World's Greatest True Crime. Barnes & Noble Publishing. ISBN 978-0-7607-5467-2.
- Bryant, Roger (December 9, 2014). William Powell: The Life and Films. McFarland. ISBN 978-0-7864-5493-8.
- Conrad, Barnaby (1999). The Blonde: A Celebration of the Golden Era from Harlow to Monroe. Chronicle Books. ISBN 978-0-8118-2591-7.
- Fleming, E.J. (2009). Paul Bern: The Life and Famous Death of the MGM Director and Husband of Harlow. McFarland. p. 298. ISBN 978-0-7864-3963-8.
- Flynn, Jane (1992). Kansas City Women of Independent Minds. Kansas City, MO: Fifield Publishing. p. 77. ISBN 978-0-9633-7580-3.
- Golden, Eve (December 1, 2000). Golden Images: 41 Essays on Silent Film Stars. McFarland. ISBN 978-0-7864-0834-4.
- Golden, Eve (1991). Platinum Girl: The Life and Legends of Jean Harlow. Abbeville Press. ISBN 978-1-5585-9214-8.
- Gragg, Larry D. (January 16, 2015). Benjamin "Bugsy" Siegel: The Gangster, the Flamingo, and the Making of Modern Las Vegas: The Gangster, the Flamingo, and the Making of Modern Las Vegas. ABC-CLIO. ISBN 978-1-4408-0186-0 – via Google Books.
- Guilbert, G.C. (2015). Madonna as Postmodern Myth: How One Star's Self-Construction Rewrites Sex, Gender, Hollywood and the American Dream. McFarland, Incorporated, Publishers. pp. 39–40. ISBN 978-0-7864-8071-5.
- Higham, Charles (September 24, 2013). Howard Hughes: The Secret Life. St. Martin's Publishing Group. ISBN 978-1-4668-5315-7.
- Jordan, Jessica Hope (2009). The Sex Goddess in American Film, 1930–1965: Jean Harlow, Mae West, Lana Turner, and Jayne Mansfield. Cambria Press. ISBN 978-1-60497-663-2.
- McDonald, Paul (2012). Hollywood Stardom. John Wiley & Sons. ISBN 9781118321669.
- McLean, Adrienne L. (December 16, 2010). Glamour in a Golden Age: Movie Stars of the 1930s. Rutgers University Press. ISBN 978-0-8135-5233-0.
- Monush, Barry (2003). Screen World Presents the Encyclopedia of Hollywood Film Actors: From the Silent Era to 1965. Vol. 1. Hal Leonard Corporation. ISBN 978-1-5578-3551-2.
- Munn, Michael (March 1, 2013). Jimmy Stewart: The Truth Behind the Legend. Skyhorse. ISBN 978-1-6287-3495-9 – via Google Books.
- Neibaur, James L. (March 28, 2019). The Jean Harlow Films. McFarland. ISBN 978-1-4766-7484-1.
- Orledge, Robert (1989). Charles Koechlin (1867–1950): His Life and Works. Psychology Press. ISBN 978-3-7186-0609-2.
- Nash, Jay Robert; Ross, Stanley Ralph (1988). The Motion Picture Guide (7th ed.). Cinebooks. ISBN 978-0-9339-9716-5.
- Parish, James Robert; Mank, Gregory W.; Stanke, Don E. (1978). The Hollywood Beauties. Arlington House Publishers. ISBN 978-0-8700-0412-4.
- Pitkin, Roy (2008). Whom the Gods Love Die Young: A Modern Medical Perspective on Illnesses that Caused the Early Death of Famous People. Dorrance Publishing. ISBN 978-1-4349-9199-7.
- Sabini, Lou (June 6, 2017). Sex In the Cinema: The Pre-Code Years (1929–1934). BearManor Media. ISBN 978-1-6293-3106-5.
- Sherrow, Victoria (2006). Encyclopedia of Hair: A Cultural History. Greenwood Publishing Group. ISBN 978-0-3133-3145-9.
- Spicer, Chrystopher J. (January 15, 2002). Clark Gable: Biography, Filmography, Bibliography. McFarland & Company. ISBN 978-0-7864-1124-5.
- Stenn, David (1993). Bombshell: The Life and Death of Jean Harlow. New York: Bentam Doubleday Dell Publishing. ISBN 978-0-3854-2157-7.
- Stone, Rolling (May 1, 1997). Madonna: The Ultimate Compendium of Interviews, Articles, Facts and Opinions From the Files of Rolling Stone. Hyperion. ISBN 978-0-7868-8154-3.
- Wayne, Jane Ellen (2002). The Golden Girls of MGM. Carroll & Graf. ISBN 978-0-7867-1303-5.
- Vieira, Mark A. (2009). Irving Thalberg: boy wonder to producer prince. Los Angeles: University of California Press. p. 178. ISBN 978-0-520-26048-1.
