= Mary Dees =

American actress

- Born: June 3, 1911; Syracuse,New York, U.S.
- Died: August 4, 2005 (aged 94); Lake Worth, Florida, U.S.
- Occupation: Actress
- Years active: 1929–1985

Mary Ella Dees (June 3, 1911 – August 4, 2005) was an American stage and screen actress with mostly minor roles. The most notable moment of her career came when Dees served as a stand-in double for the deceased Hollywood star Jean Harlow who had died during the filming of Saratoga (1937), enabling the completion of the film.

== Biography and career ==
Born in Syracuse, New York, on June 3, 1911, the daughter of a successful lawyer, Dees was for a time raised in Tuscaloosa, Alabama. She worked for a short time as a typist before moving to Hollywood in 1932. She was named Miss America in Hollywood in 1932, an accomplishment that led director Jack Conway to give her a bit part in Red Headed Woman. That film starred Jean Harlow, who befriended Dees. She advised the newcomer to study dancing, helped her to shop for "the right clothes" and helped to pay for Dees's gowns.

Dees was a dancer and bit-part actress when, in 1937, after the sudden death of Harlow, she was cast by MGM boss Louis B. Mayer as a four-minute stand-in for the star, who was acting opposite Clark Gable on the film Saratoga, which was still in production.

Dees had parts in The Last Gangster (1937), The Women (1939), as well as a number of Three Stooges shorts, which included Hoi Polloi (1935), and numerous Marx Brothers comedies.

=== Later career ===
Dees appeared in her last film role in 1946, in the Marx Brothers film A Night in Casablanca. She continued to act on stage in repertory theatre until 1985.

== Death ==
Dees died on August 4, 2005, in Lake Worth, Florida, aged 94, after a long illness.

== Filmography ==
Year	Title	Role	Notes
1931	Flying High	Chorus Girl	Uncredited
1933	Dinner at Eight	Minor Role	Uncredited
1933	Footlight Parade	Chorus Girl	Uncredited
1934	Let's Talk It Over	Woman at Beach	Uncredited
1934	The Man with Two Faces	Theatregoer	Uncredited
1934	Kid Millions	Paulette	Uncredited
1935	Gold Diggers of 1935	Chorus Girl	Uncredited
1935	Redheads on Parade	Redhead	Uncredited
1935	Two-Fisted	Minor Role	Uncredited
1936	Anything Goes	Chorus Girl	Uncredited
1936	Born to Dance	Chorine	Uncredited
1937	Saratoga	Carol Clayton	(after Jean Harlow's Death); Uncredited
1937	Bad Guy	Girl	Uncredited
1937	The Last Gangster	Virginia Bauche	Uncredited
1938	The Shopworn Angel	Babe #1	Uncredited
1939	The Women	Girl	Uncredited
1946	A Night in Casablanca	Minor Role	Uncredited, (final film role)
