= The Girl from Missouri =

1934 film by Jack Conway

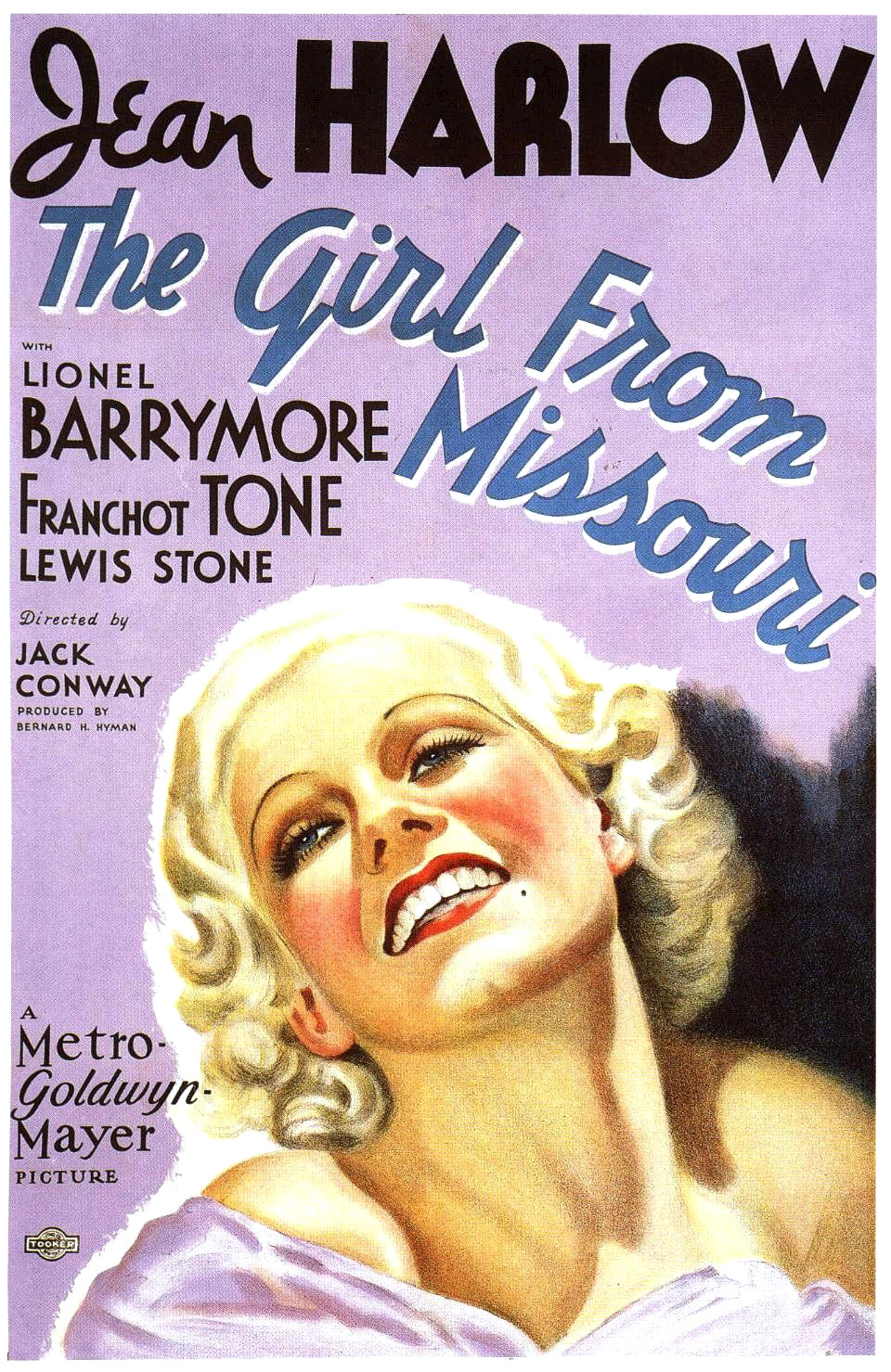
- Theatrical release poster
- Directed by: Jack Conway
- Written by: Anita Loos; John Emerson; Howard Emmett Rogers
- Produced by: Bernard H. Hyman
- Starring: Jean Harlow; Lionel Barrymore; Franchot Tone
- Cinematography: Ray June; Harold Rosson
- Edited by: Tom Held
- Music by: Dr. William Axt
- Production company: Metro-Goldwyn-Mayer
- Distributed by: Loew's Inc.
- Release date: August 3, 1934
- Running time: 75 minutes
- Country: United States
- Language: English
- Budget: $511,000

The Girl from Missouri (originally called Born to Be Kissed) is a 1934 American romantic comedy drama film directed by Jack Conway and starring Jean Harlow, Lionel Barrymore and Franchot Tone. The screenplay was written by Anita Loos.

== Plot ==
Eadie lives in Kansas City, working as a waitress-slash-dance partner at a beer joint owned by her abusive stepfather. She runs away to New York City with her man-hungry friend Kitty. On the train, she tells Kitty that she has ideals and plans to marry a somebody so she can accomplish something worthwhile. A millionaire seems just right to her. Any millionaire.

She lands a job as one of the chorus girls entertaining guests at a stag party at the mansion of wealthy Frank Cousins. There, she manages to see Cousins alone; knowing he is about to commit suicide over unplayable debts, he offers her expensive gifts, including a pair of expensive star ruby cufflinks, but she refuses to accept them until they become engaged. She is surprised when he readily agrees. Unbeknownst to her, guest T.R. Paige had just before refused to save Cousins from financial ruin. After Eadie leaves Cousins he shoots himself. Seeking to cover her dubious tracks she becomes rather intimately acquainted with T.R. when she gets him to retrieve the cufflinks from her stocking before the investigating policeman can ask where and how she got them (intimating she’d be accused either of Cousins’ murder or robbing the corpse).

"Following the money", Eadie visits her new friend at his workplace to reconnect with him. When she says she has been fired and that she is determined to marry a rich man, an alarmed T.R. gives her some money and leaves for Palm Beach, Florida. Eadie and Kitty follow and visit T.R.'s Florida office. The comely, yet overtly trashy, Eadie is spotted in the waiting room by T.R.'s son Tom. Not knowing who he is, Eadie tries to brush him off, but he is very persistent. Eventually, she learns his identity, but remains cool to him, since it becomes clear that he is not interested in marriage. Tom finally manages to get her alone in his bedroom in the Paige mansion, but she defends her virtue and, to both their surprise, he lets her go.

Tom tells his father that he wants to marry Eadie, despite her low class past. T.R. gives his blessing, but after Tom leaves, calls the district attorney. Tom tells Eadie they are going to get married. After he leaves however, a man sneaks into her apartment. Some photographers catch her in the stranger's arms and the district attorney accuses her of stealing Cousins' jewelry and jails her. When Tom and his father come to see her, she tells Tom that T.R. must have framed her, but Tom's father is much more persuasive and Tom breaks up with Eadie.

Tom's rival, the married Charlie Turner, bails Eadie out. For revenge, she sneaks into T.R.'s stateroom on the liner he and Tom are taking to London. She emerges unexpectedly, clad only in lingerie, and embraces a surprised T.R just as photographers take his picture.

Having been disillusioned, Eadie gets drunk and turns to Charlie Turner. However, Kitty keeps them from being alone together as long as she can. Tom arrives just in time, having changed his mind, and puts Eadie in the shower to sober up. T.R. follows. To save his reputation, he has told the press she was innocent of the theft and that she was married to Tom. He is also impressed by her fighting spirit. A quick wedding is arranged on the spot.

== Cast ==
- Jean Harlow as Edith 'Eadie' Chapman
- Lionel Barrymore as Thomas Randall 'T.R.' Paige
- Franchot Tone as T.R. 'Tom' Paige Jr.
- Lewis Stone as Frank Cousins
- Patsy Kelly as Kitty Lennihan
- Alan Mowbray as Lord Douglas
- Clara Blandick as Miss Newberry, T.R.'s secretary
- Hale Hamilton as Charlie Turner
- Garry Owen as Sailor Cupick - Kitty's Date
- Nat Pendleton as Lifeguard

== See also ==
- Lionel Barrymore filmography
