= Saratoga (film) =

1937 film by Jack Conway

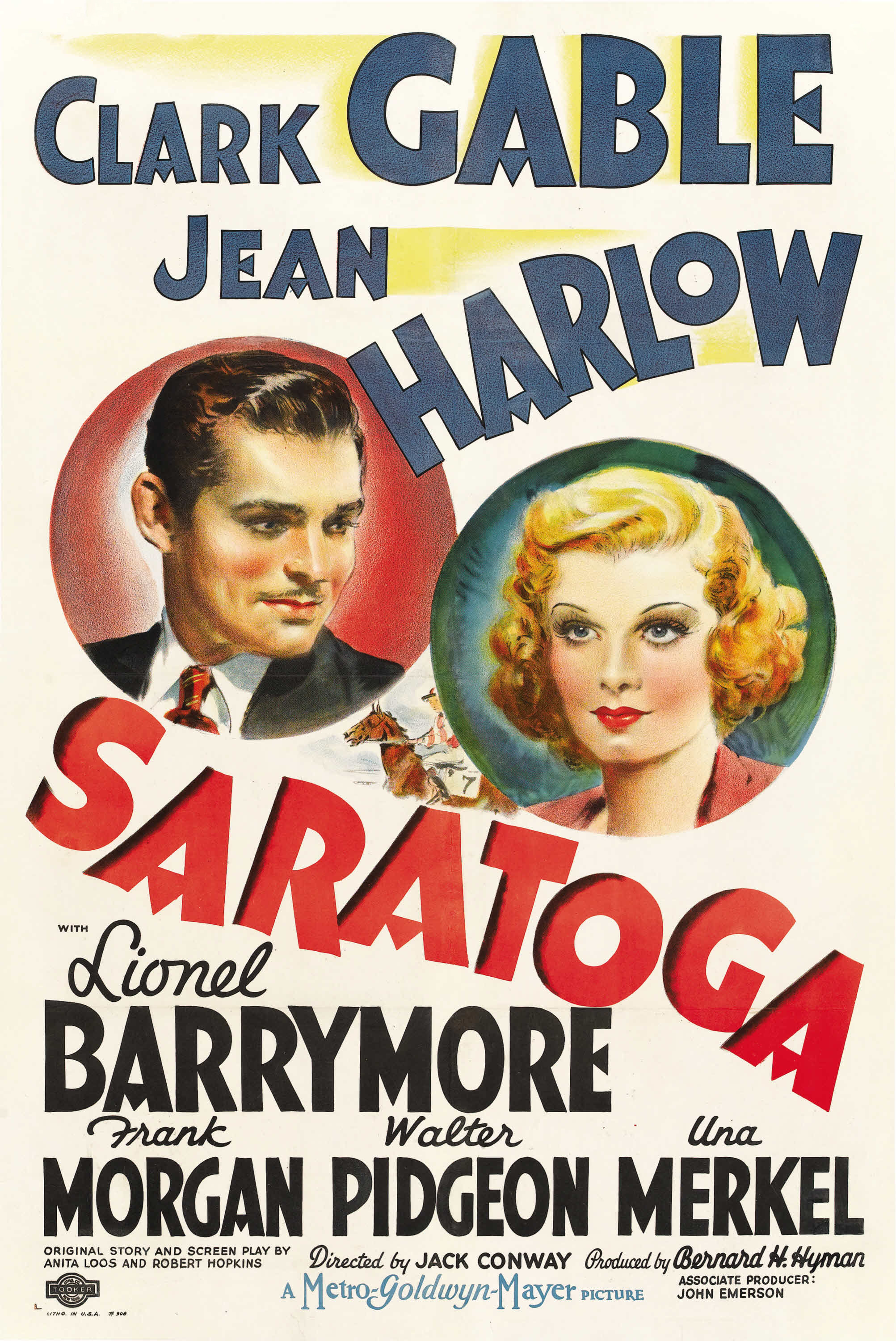
- Theatrical poster
- Directed by: Jack Conway
- Screenplay by: Anita Loos; Robert Hopkins
- Story by: Anita Loos; Robert Hopkins
- Produced by: Bernard H. Hyman
- Starring: Clark Gable; Jean Harlow
- Cinematography: Ray June
- Edited by: Elmo Veron
- Music by: Edward Ward
- Production company: Metro-Goldwyn-Mayer
- Distributed by: Loew's Inc.
- Release date: July 23, 1937
- Running time: 92 minutes
- Country: United States
- Language: English
- Budget: $1.1 million
- Box office: $3.252 million (worldwide rentals)

Saratoga is a 1937 American romantic comedy film starring Clark Gable and Jean Harlow and directed by Jack Conway. The screenplay was written by Anita Loos. Lionel Barrymore, Frank Morgan, Walter Pidgeon, and Una Merkel appear as featured players; Hattie McDaniel and Margaret Hamilton appear in support. It was the sixth and final film collaboration of Gable and Harlow.

Jean Harlow died before filming was finished, and it was completed using a stand-in. Saratoga became the highest-grossing film of 1937, as well as the highest-grossing film of Harlow's career.

== Plot ==
The bank is taking the stud from Grandpa Clayton and the family's Brookvale Farm in Saratoga. Bookie Duke Bradley, a longtime friend, stops it by buying him back. Snooty granddaughter Carol, a bombshell seeking to acquire a European patina, calls from an English estate. She announces her engagement to the wealthy Wall Street mogul Hartley Madison, a former pony player who once took Duke for $50,000. Duke takes the call, and breaks the news to her father, Frank Clayton, and Grandpa. Broke, Frank gives Duke the deed to Brookvale to pay his gambling debts. Duke meets Hartley and Carol at the races. Duke is desperate to draw Hartley back to the track. Carol is adamantly against it. Duke greets attractive old friend Fritzi with a kiss. During a race, Frank collapses and dies.

Carol asks Duke to sell her back the farm, but Duke assures her he will not foreclose on Grandpa. They quarrel about her marrying for money. Fritzi tells Duke that her new husband, cold cream magnate Jesse Kiffmeyer, is allergic to horses. To ensure she still gets the horse she wants, Dubonnet, Duke finesses Jesse's sneeze at a horse auction into the winning bid on it. Grandpa tells Duke that Carol is selling her horse, Moonray; she tells Duke she needs money to pay him off. Duke bids Hartley up to $14,000 at the auction, then drops out, thereby also guaranteeing that, as Moonray's owner, Hartley will come back to the track. Hartley asks Grandpa to train the horse.

Carol studies horses and wins money from Duke. They spend much time together at the tracks and traveling the length of the Atlantic seaboard by rail. In the process, Carol begins to thaw towards Duke. Seeking to get Harley down to Florida to bet, Duke calls on him in New York and tells him Carol needs help with her nerves. Hartley flies down with Dr. Bierd, who says Carol is "emotional". He insists she should marry soon or avoid seeing Hartley. The tempestuousness, however, is all about her affection for Duke and his fluctuating allegiances.

Laying bait to get Hartley to stick around, Duke gets him to wager and win $6,000. Carol tells Hartley not to bet with Duke, insisting he is just out to swindle him. After convincing Hartley to leave, Carol then asks him to stay. Hartley bets with Duke and loses $5,000.

On a train Duke dines with Fritzi and Jesse, who is madly jealous of Duke, believing he is carrying on with Fritzi. She knows Duke is in love with Carol, and Duke says he plans to win enough money to marry her and be able to run Brookvale farm properly. Carol tells Duke she loves him and intends to break off her engagement to Hartley. When Duke objects to losing him as a pigeon, she gets angry. At the races, Hartley loses.

The Hopeful Stakes, the biggest race of the season at Saratoga, is coming. Gambling everything, Duke accepts Hartley's $100,000 wager on Moonray to win, confident he will still triumph with top jockey Dixie Gordon on Dubonnet. Carol secretly gets Gordon to switch horses to Moonray so Duke will lose. The race is close, but Dubonnet wins by a nose. Hartley realizes Carol has fallen for Duke and steps aside.

== Cast ==
- Clark Gable as Duke Bradley
- Jean Harlow as Carol Clayton
- Lionel Barrymore as Grandpa Clayton
- Frank Morgan as Jesse Kiffmeyer
- Walter Pidgeon as Hartley Madison
- Una Merkel as Fritzi
- Cliff Edwards as Tip
- George Zucco as Dr. Harmsworth Bierd
- Jonathan Hale as Frank Clayton
- Hattie McDaniel as Rosetta
- Frankie Darro as Dixie Gordon
- Henry Stone as Hand-Riding Hurley
- Margaret Hamilton as Maizie (uncredited)
- Ernie Stanton as Man in crowd (uncredited)
- Patsy O'Connor as Katie Hurley (uncredited)
- Dennis O'Keefe as Second Bidder/Dancer at party (uncredited)

== Production ==
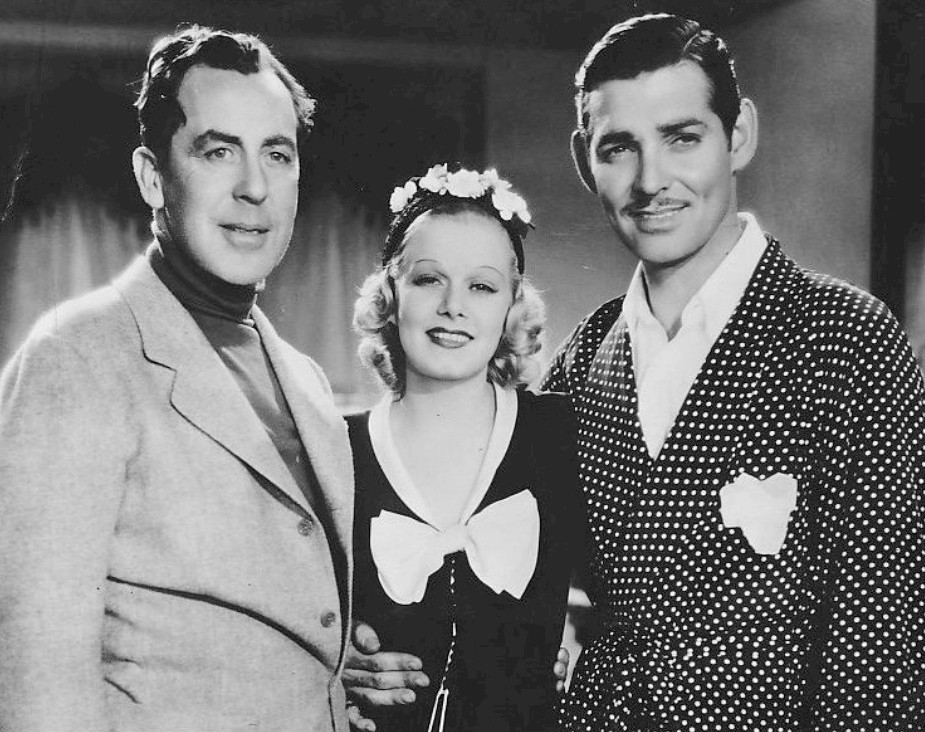
This photo of director Jack Conway, Jean Harlow and Clark Gable was taken only minutes before Harlow's collapse and was issued at the time her death was announced.

Although screenwriter Robert Hopkins originally intended the script to be a vehicle for Harlow, the studio at first attempted to borrow Carole Lombard from Paramount Pictures for the lead role, but could not do so because of contractual difficulties. It was reported that Joan Crawford would star but by 1937, Harlow was reported as being cast. Walter Pidgeon was borrowed from Universal for the film.

Background filming took place in Lexington and Louisville, Kentucky as well as in Saratoga Springs, New York.

Lionel Barrymore tripped over a cable on set, breaking his hip for the second time in two years and reportedly breaking his knee cap. In 1951, he said that he needed a wheelchair because of the damage to his hip.

At the time of filming, Harlow was suffering from myriad health issues and a tumultuous personal life. She was dealing with the aftermath of oral surgery to remove impacted wisdom teeth and had suffered sun poisoning in the months before filming. Unbeknownst to Harlow, she was also dying of renal failure caused by complications of scarlet fever that she had contracted as a child. In 1936, she divorced her third husband, cinematographer Harold Rosson, whom she had married a year after her second husband, Paul Bern, died in 1932 by what was later ruled a suicide. During filming, Harlow was in a relationship with William Powell. While she was eager to marry Powell, he was resistant, though the two were reportedly engaged.

On May 29, 1937, Harlow collapsed on the set during a scene with Walter Pidgeon. She was taken to Good Samaritan Hospital, where, on June 7, she died of renal failure at the age of 26. Although approximately 90% of the film was finished, MGM planned to shelve the footage with Harlow and reshoot her scenes with Virginia Bruce or Jean Arthur. However, Harlow's fans were adamant that her final film be released. MGM acquiesced and shot the remaining Harlow scenes with Mary Dees, who at that point had been Harlow's stand-in for two years. Dees was shot from behind or with costumes that obscured her face, playing Harlow's part for the camera, while Paula Winslowe supplied Harlow's voice.

== Reception ==
Saratoga was released on July 23, 1937, barely seven weeks after Harlow's death, which was one reason it became one of the year's highest-grossing films. According to MGM records the film earned $2,432,000 in the US and Canada and $820,000 elsewhere, resulting in a profit of $1,146,000.

Reviews were generally positive, despite some commenting on the sadness of seeing Harlow so soon after her death. Writing for Night and Day in 1937, Graham Greene gave the film a good review, claiming that it demonstrated "more than curiosity value". Greene noted that Harlow's acting achieved a high point in her career, and praised the film as having been "skilfully sewn-up [in such a way that] the missing scenes and shots lend it an air of originality which the correctly canned product mightn't have had: the story proceed[ing] faster, less obviously: the heroine less unduly plugged".

Modern Screen’s Leo Townsend eulogized Harlow in his review, and wrote, "Jean Harlow's last picture can be classed among her best. Her performance, full of the vital and particular charm that was hers, will stand as a monument to her. Saratoga is fast-moving, hard-boiled comedy, and the excellence of Miss Harlow's work in it, in spite of its hilarity, serves to accentuate the tragedy of her passing. She leaves a niche in screen entertainment which can never be filled."

== See also ==
- List of films about horses
- List of films about horse racing
