= Red-Headed Woman =

1932 film by Jack Conway

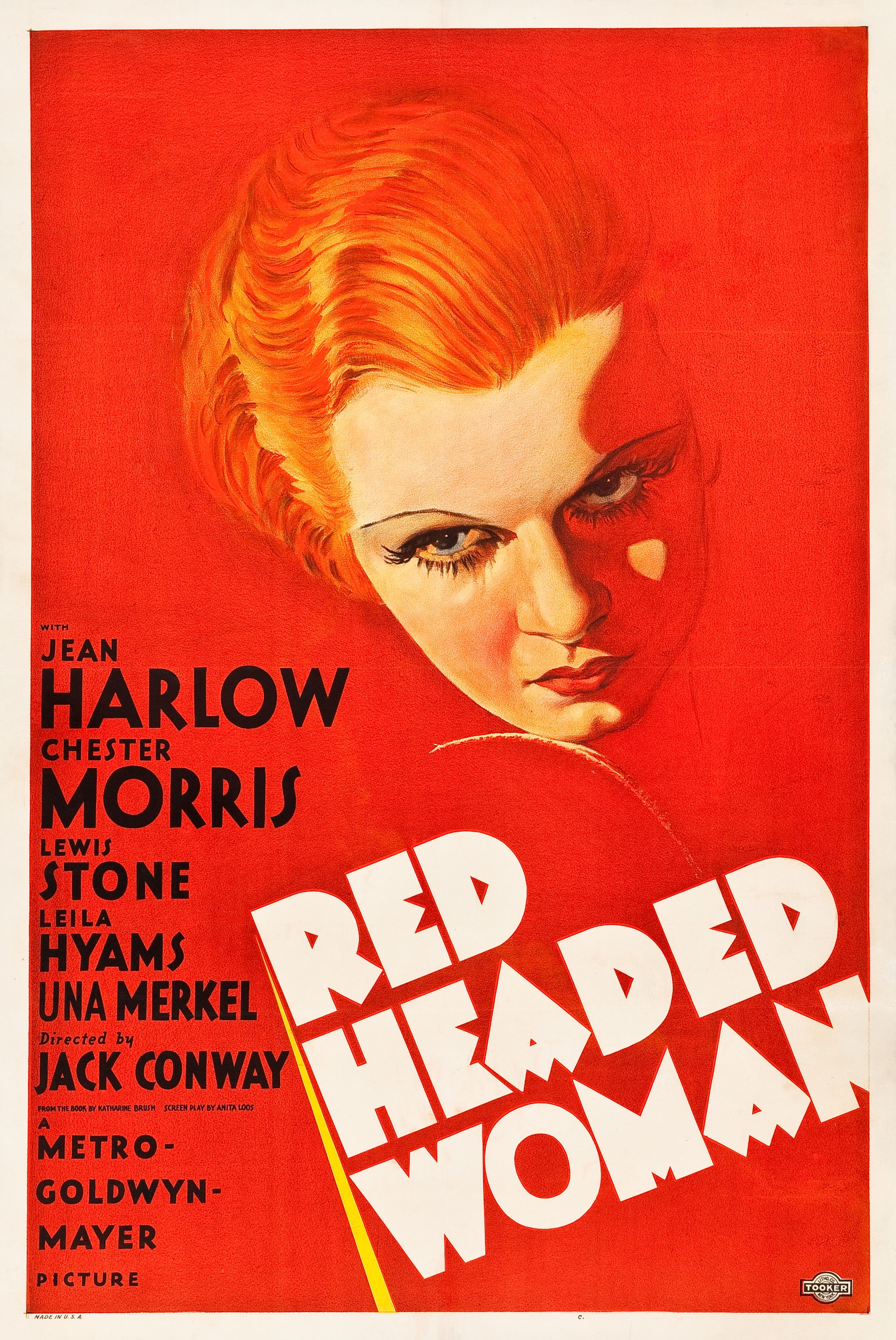
- Theatrical release poster
- Directed by: Jack Conway
- Written by: F. Scott Fitzgerald (uncredited)
- Screenplay by: Anita Loos
- Based on: Red-Headed Woman (1931 novel) by Katharine Brush
- Produced by: Paul Bern
- Starring: Jean Harlow; Chester Morris; Lewis Stone; Leila Hyams; Una Merkel
- Cinematography: Harold Rosson
- Edited by: Blanche Sewell
- Music by: Richard A. Whiting; Raymond B. Egan
- Distributed by: Metro-Goldwyn-Mayer
- Release date: June 25, 1932
- Running time: 79 minutes
- Country: United States
- Language: English

Red-Headed Woman is a 1932 American pre-Code romantic comedy film directed by Jack Conway from a screenplay by Anita Loos, based on the 1931 novel of the same name by Katharine Brush. Produced by Metro-Goldwyn-Mayer, the film stars Jean Harlow as a gold-digging secretary who is determined to advance her social position by any means necessary, including seducing her wealthy married boss. Chester Morris, Lewis Stone, Leila Hyams, and Una Merkel also star.

== Plot ==
Lillian "Lil" Andrews is a young secretary in the small town of Renwood, Ohio, who is willing to do whatever it takes to improve her social status. Determined to seduce her wealthy boss William "Bill" Legendre Jr., she goes to his house on the pretext of bringing him his mail while his wife Irene is out of town. Lil eventually confesses her feelings for Bill before kissing him. He insists that he loves his wife, but after learning that Lil wears his picture in her garter, he gives in to her advances. When Irene returns home unexpectedly that night, Lil rushes out, and Bill assures a heartbroken Irene that he will not see Lil again.

The next day, Bill's father, William Legendre Sr., offers Lil money and a job in Cleveland in an effort to keep her away from his son. Feigning indignation, she insists on seeing Bill, who demands that she leave town. Some time later, after spotting Bill and Irene at a nightclub, Lil lures him into a phone booth where, despite his protests, they kiss and he agrees to meet her at her place the next night. However, Irene later forgives Bill and they reconcile. The next night, when Bill fails to show up, an intoxicated Lil marches to his house and makes a scene in front of Irene, revealing their kiss at the nightclub. Bill angrily follows Lil to her apartment, offers her money to leave town and slaps her, but they end up having sex.

Soon after Bill and Irene divorce, she attempts to reconcile with him, only to find that he married Lil the previous day. Irene warns Lil that their marriage will not last since it is based solely on sex. To Lil's frustration, Bill has not yet introduced her to his friends or invited her to any social events. When illustrious New York coal tycoon Charles B. Gaerste, a longtime friend and business associate of the Legendres, visits Renwood, Lil seduces him and blackmails him into inviting his friends to a party at her mansion in his honor, hoping to be accepted into high society. On the night of the party, however, the guests leave early to attend a surprise party for Irene, who lives across the street.

Humiliated, Lil insists on going to New York City. Having found Lil's handkerchief in Gaerste's hotel room, William Sr. shows it to his son, who allows her to go to New York alone but threatens to divorce her if she cheats on him. While in New York, Lil begins an affair with Gaerste, who asks her to marry him, unaware that she is also having an affair with his handsome French chauffeur Albert. Soon, Bill visits Gaerste's apartment and shows him compromising photographs of Lil and Albert that he has obtained from his detectives, before announcing his intention to divorce Lil. Gaerste then fires Albert.

When Albert informs Lil that Gaerste has discovered their affair, she quickly returns to Renwood but finds that Bill has reconciled with Irene. William Sr. offers Lil a check for $500 to leave town, but she chases after Bill, who is driving away with Irene, and shoots him. He survives and refuses to have Lil charged with attempted murder. Two years later, Bill, who has since remarried Irene, spots Lil at a racetrack in Paris in the company of an aged French millionaire. He discreetly hides Irene's binoculars. Lil and her elderly companion leave in a limousine driven by Albert.

== Cast ==
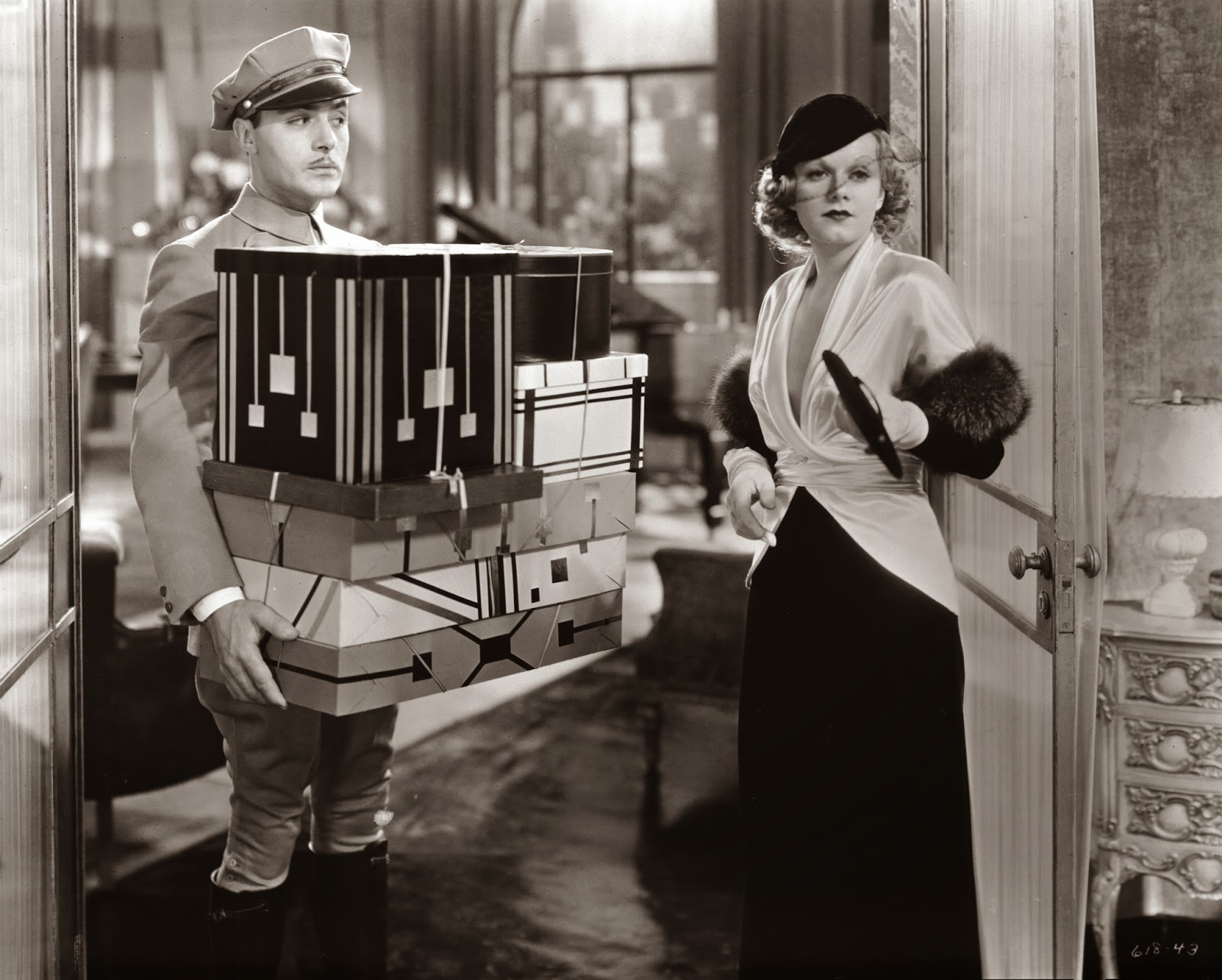
Charles Boyer as Albert and Jean Harlow as Lillian

- Jean Harlow as Lillian "Lil"/"Red" Andrews
- Chester Morris as William "Bill" Legendre Jr.
- Lewis Stone as William Legendre Sr.
- Leila Hyams as Irene Legendre
- Una Merkel as Sally
- Henry Stephenson as Charles B. Gaerste
- May Robson as Aunt Jane
- Charles Boyer as Albert
- Harvey Clark as Uncle Fred

== Production ==
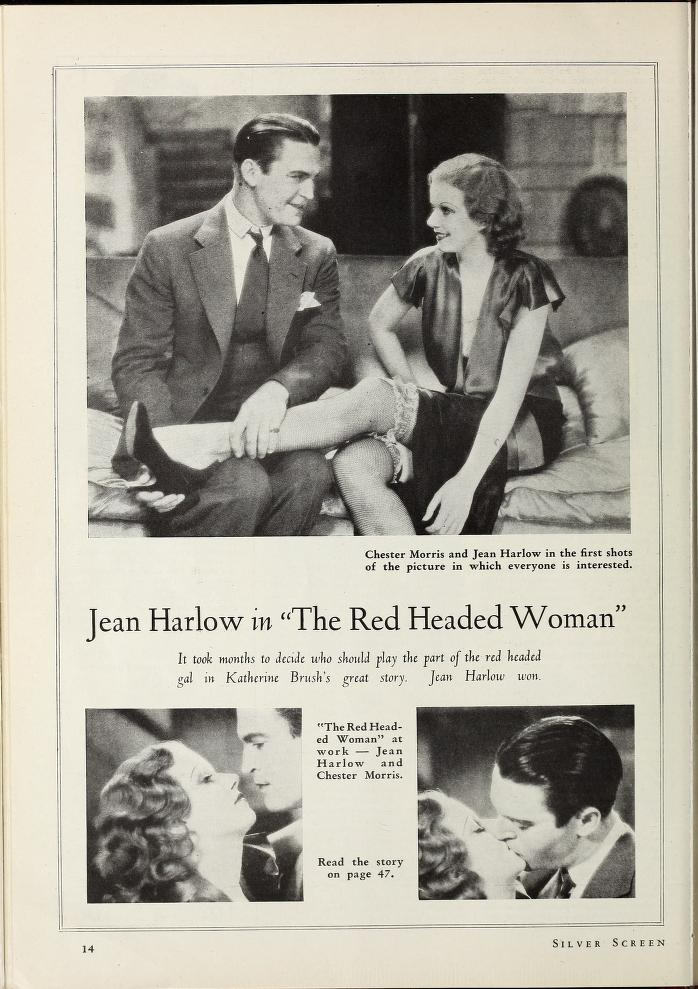
Advertisement in Silver Screen magazine, July 1932

The film proved difficult from its inception. F. Scott Fitzgerald and Marcel de Sano were originally hired to collaborate on creating a script adapted from Katherine Brush's 1931 novel. Fitzgerald initially turned down MGM's offer as their offer of $750 per week was not satisfactory; producer Irving Thalberg, however, raised the sum to $1,200 since he wanted Fitzgerald's name on the project. Fitzgerald then objected to working with de Sano, insisting that he work alone, but he was forced to comply. The two quickly experienced a falling out, but still finished the script in five weeks. Despite all this effort, however, Thalberg was concerned that the original story and the first draft of a script by Fitzgerald and de Sano was too serious, and offered the job of rewriting it to Anita Loos, instructing her to provide something that was more fun and playful and with a greater emphasis on comedy. MGM then hired Loos, who completed rough and revised drafts of the script between January and February 1932. (Both scripts are currently owned by Yale University at the Beinecke Rare Book & Manuscript Library.)

Red-Headed Woman was filmed at MGM Studios in Culver City, California. MGM's "English House" and "New York Street" backlots—both located in Lot 2—were primary filming locations for the production.

Before casting Harlow, MGM considered casting Clara Bow as Lillian Andrews, who originally agreed to take the part but objected to the "future services" option demanded by the studio. Screenland also noted that Colleen Moore was considered for the part. In its April 12, 1932, issue, however, Motion Picture magazine reported seeing Jean Harlow at the premiere of the film Grand Hotel sporting red, "titian hair", suggesting she was involved in the production. The "Modern Screen" gossip column in The Hollywood Times confirmed these suspicions in May 1932 stating: "Guess who is going to be MGM's 'Red-Headed Woman'? No other than that famous platinum blonde, Jean Harlow. They will either have to get a new title for the picture, or a very large bottle of very extra red henna for Jean's crowning glory." The opening scene of the film shows Harlow's character getting her hair dyed red. The film's first line of dialogue is "So gentlemen prefer blondes, do they? Ha!" The film, in fact, was Harlow's first film after having left Hollywood for a few months following a fall-out with Howard Hughes, as reported by Screenland.

Although uncredited, Harlow's husband Paul Bern was the film's production supervisor.

Prior to the film's release, producer Thalberg worked with the Will Hays Office to shore up the censor's approval. Of particular concern were several scenes in which Harlow was partially undressed or making obvious sexual advances. Thalberg eventually agreed to seventeen cuts. Despite this fact, the film still received a number of complaints from cinema patrons.

== Reception ==
Critical response to Red-Headed Woman was overwhelmingly positive. McCarthy of the Motion Picture Herald wrote: "Sexy, racy, bristling with snappy dialogue, funny, [Red-Headed Woman] is loaded with dynamite that can be dynamic entertainment, or an explosion of objections unless you handle it properly and with all the finesse and ability that your showmanship experience commands." The September 1932 edition of Screenland also gave the film a glowing review, writing: "The film [Red-Headed Woman] follows Katherine Brush's novel with satirical improvements by Anita Loos, who, fed up with blondes, gives red-headed women their due... See this for sheer amusement. Jean plays a mean part so cleverly that you can't help liking this wild red-headed woman." Along with this review, Screenland chose Red-Headed Woman as one of the six best pictures of the month and named Harlow's performance "one of the ten best portrayals of the month."

Red-Headed Woman opened in France as La Belle Aux Cheveux Roux and in Spain as La Pelirroja. Zárraga, a reporter for Cine-Mundial, a Spanish-language magazine, wrote: "Red-Headed Woman was predestined to triumph. Step-by-step [Harlow] succeeded, and the secret of her success was not precisely in her statuary beauty, nor in her famous platinum-colored hair: it was, above all, in her disturbing way of kissing..." The film was banned in the United Kingdom.
