= Clark Gable filmography =

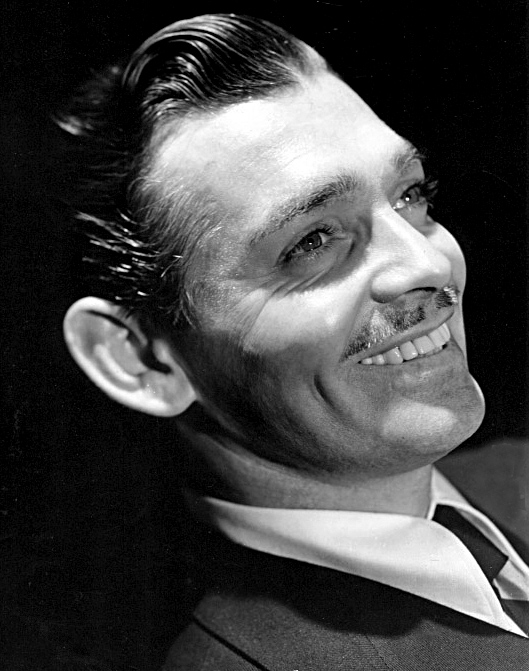
Gable in a 1938 publicity still

Clark Gable (1901–1960) was an American actor and producer who appeared in over 70 feature films and several short films. Gable first began acting in stage productions, before his film debut in 1924. After many minor roles, Gable landed a leading role in 1931, subsequently becoming one of the most dominant leading men in Hollywood. He often acted alongside re-occurring leading ladies: six films with Jean Harlow, seven with Myrna Loy, and eight with Joan Crawford, among many others.

Gable's first role opposite Joan Crawford was in Dance, Fools, Dance (1931), the first of eight films in which they appeared together. He was billed sixth. That same year, he also appeared in the gangster film The Secret Six, his first film with Harlow. In 1932, he acted alongside future wife Carole Lombard in No Man of Her Own. In his next role in Dancing Lady (1933), Gable appeared alongside Ted Healy and His Stooges and Fred Astaire, who was making his acting debut. Gable's role in the Frank Capra-directed It Happened One Night (1934) garnered him the Academy Award for Best Actor.

For his performance in Mutiny on the Bounty (1935), Gable was nominated for the Academy Award for Best Actor. He then appeared in San Francisco, which was the highest-grossing film of 1936. In 1937, he starred in Saratoga; his co-star Jean Harlow died during production. Gable then appeared in Too Hot to Handle (1938), the last of seven films with Myrna Loy. He then played Rhett Butler in Gone with the Wind (1939), acting alongside Vivien Leigh and Olivia de Havilland. The film was massively successful, winning the Academy Award for Best Picture, and remains the highest-grossing film of all time, adjusted for inflation. The following year, Gable starred with leading lady Hedy Lamarr in the King Vidor-directed Comrade X. Also released that year, Strange Cargo would be Gable's last film with Crawford. His final film before joining the United States Army Air Forces was Somewhere I'll Find You (1942). During the war, he narrated the propaganda film Wings Up (1942), and filmed Combat America (1945).

Gable's first film after returning from combat was the Victor Fleming-directed Adventure (1945). His next role was alongside leading ladies Ava Gardner and Deborah Kerr in The Hucksters (1947). Gable next collaborated with Gardner and Grace Kelly in the John Ford-directed Mogambo (1953), a remake of Gable's earlier film Red Dust (1932). In 1958, Gable appeared in Run Silent, Run Deep, which also featured Burt Lancaster and Don Rickles. That same year, he starred opposite Doris Day and Mamie Van Doren in Teacher's Pet, which garnered him a nomination for Golden Globe Award for Best Actor – Motion Picture Musical or Comedy. Gable acted alongside Sophia Loren in It Started in Naples (1960). Gable's final film appearance was in the John Huston-directed western The Misfits (1961), released posthumously. It was also Marilyn Monroe's last acting role.

== Film ==
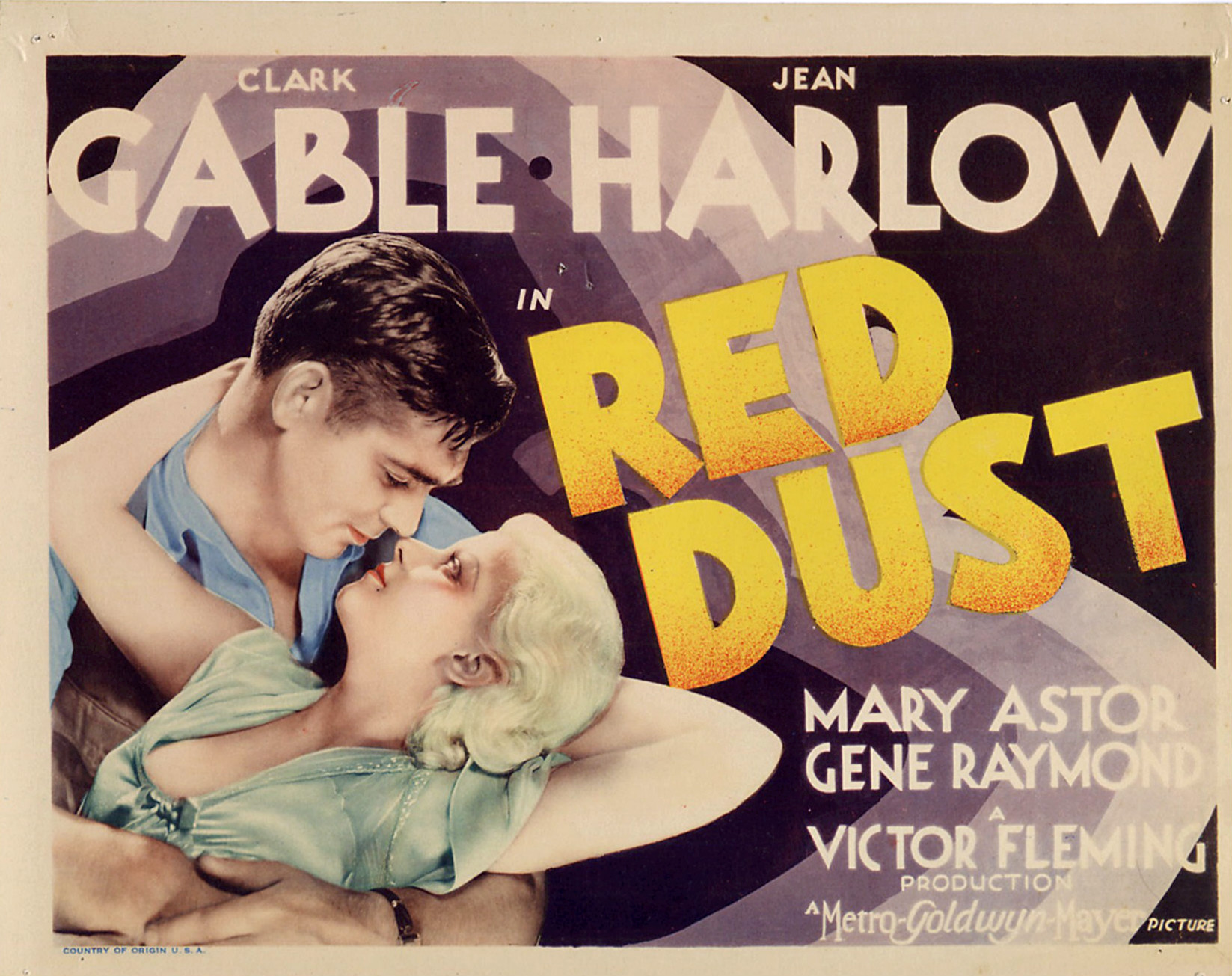
Gable and Jean Harlow on the poster for Red Dust (1932)

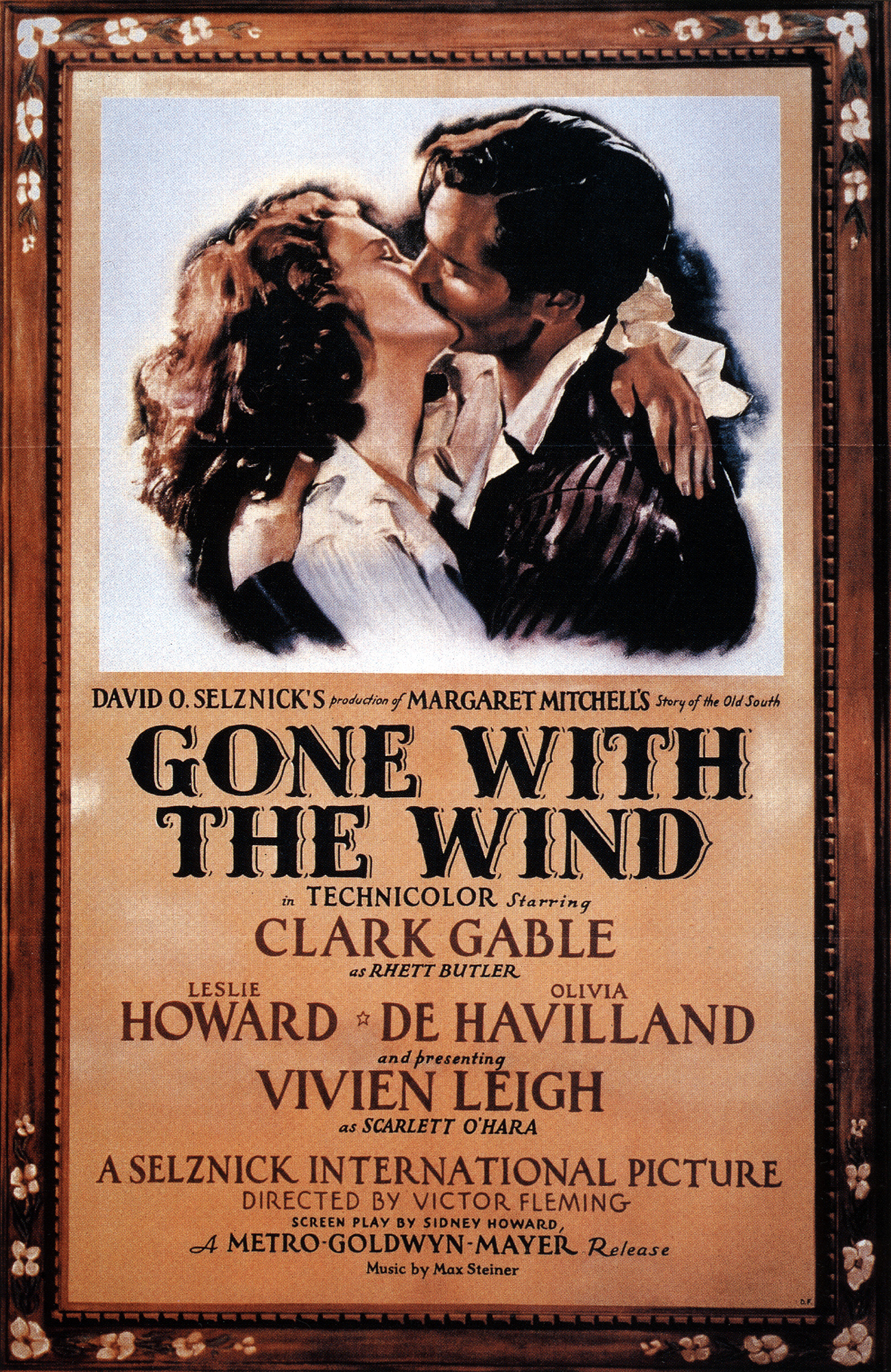
Gable and Vivien Leigh on the poster for Gone with the Wind (1939)

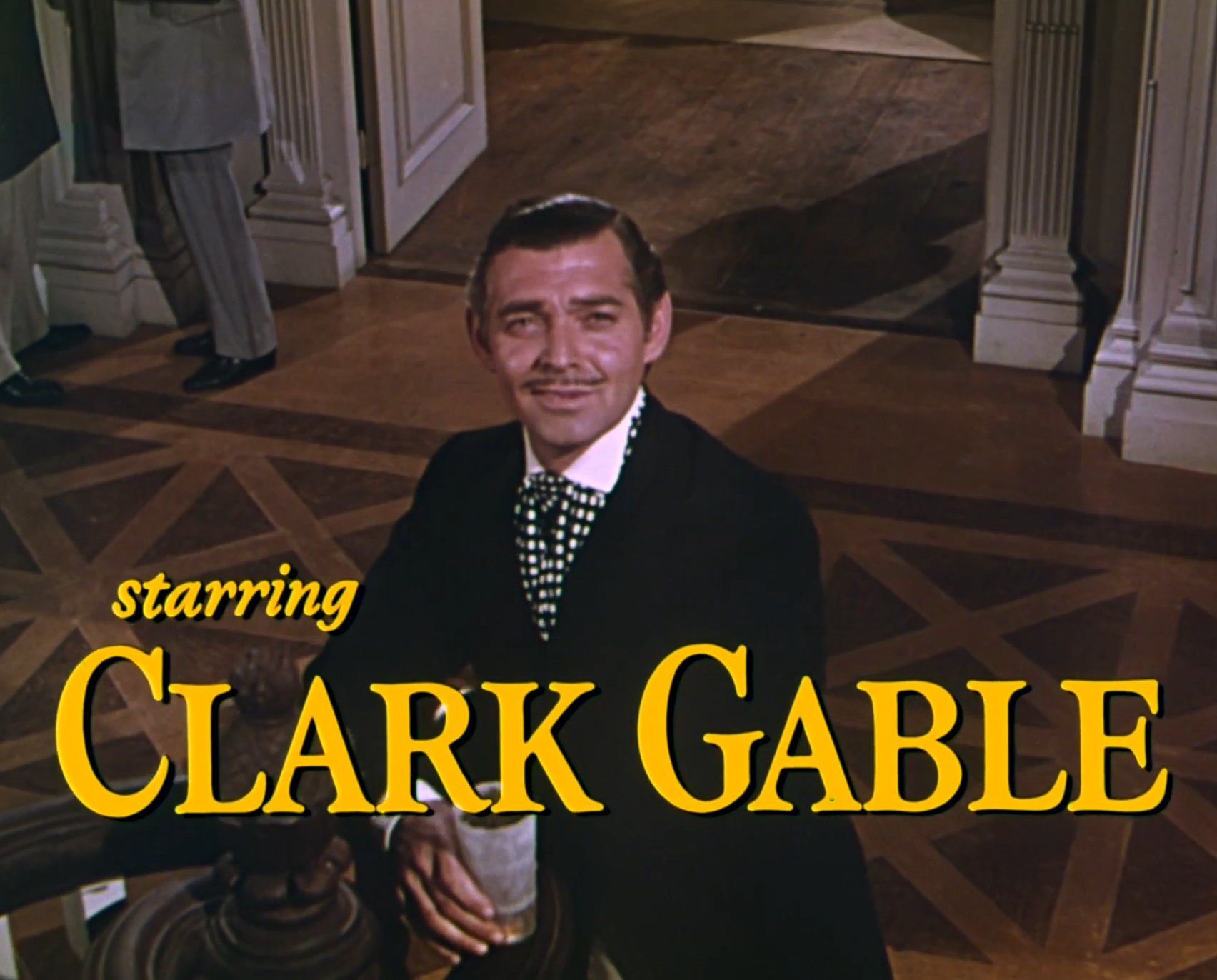
Gable as Rhett Butler

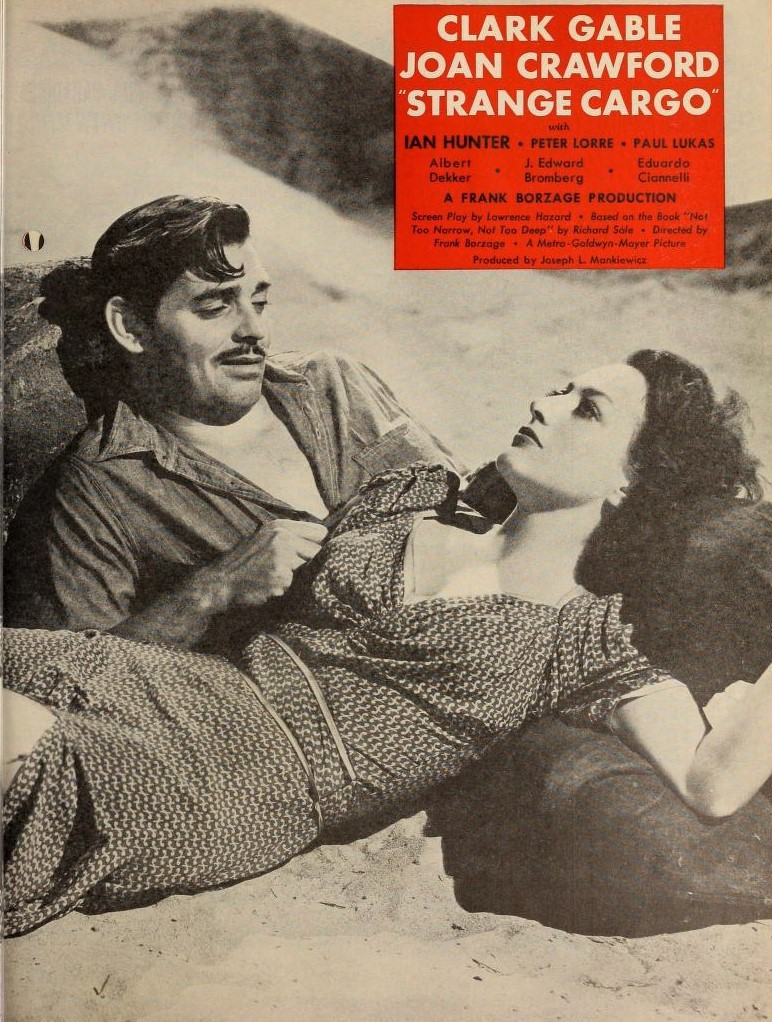
Gable and Joan Crawford in Strange Cargo (1940)

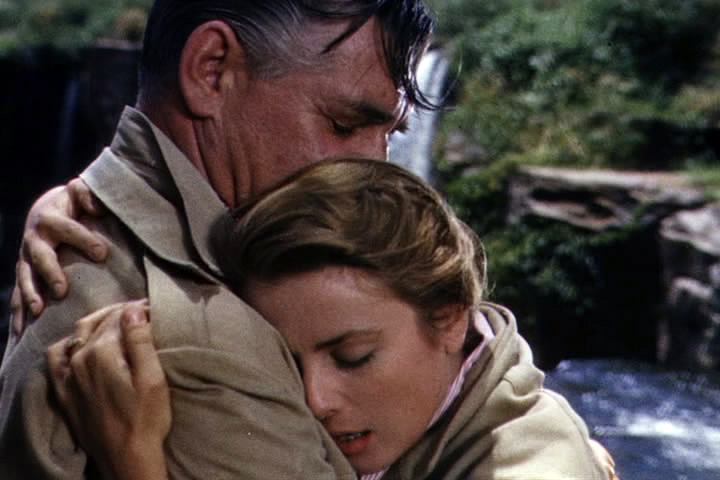
Gable and Grace Kelly in Mogambo (1953)

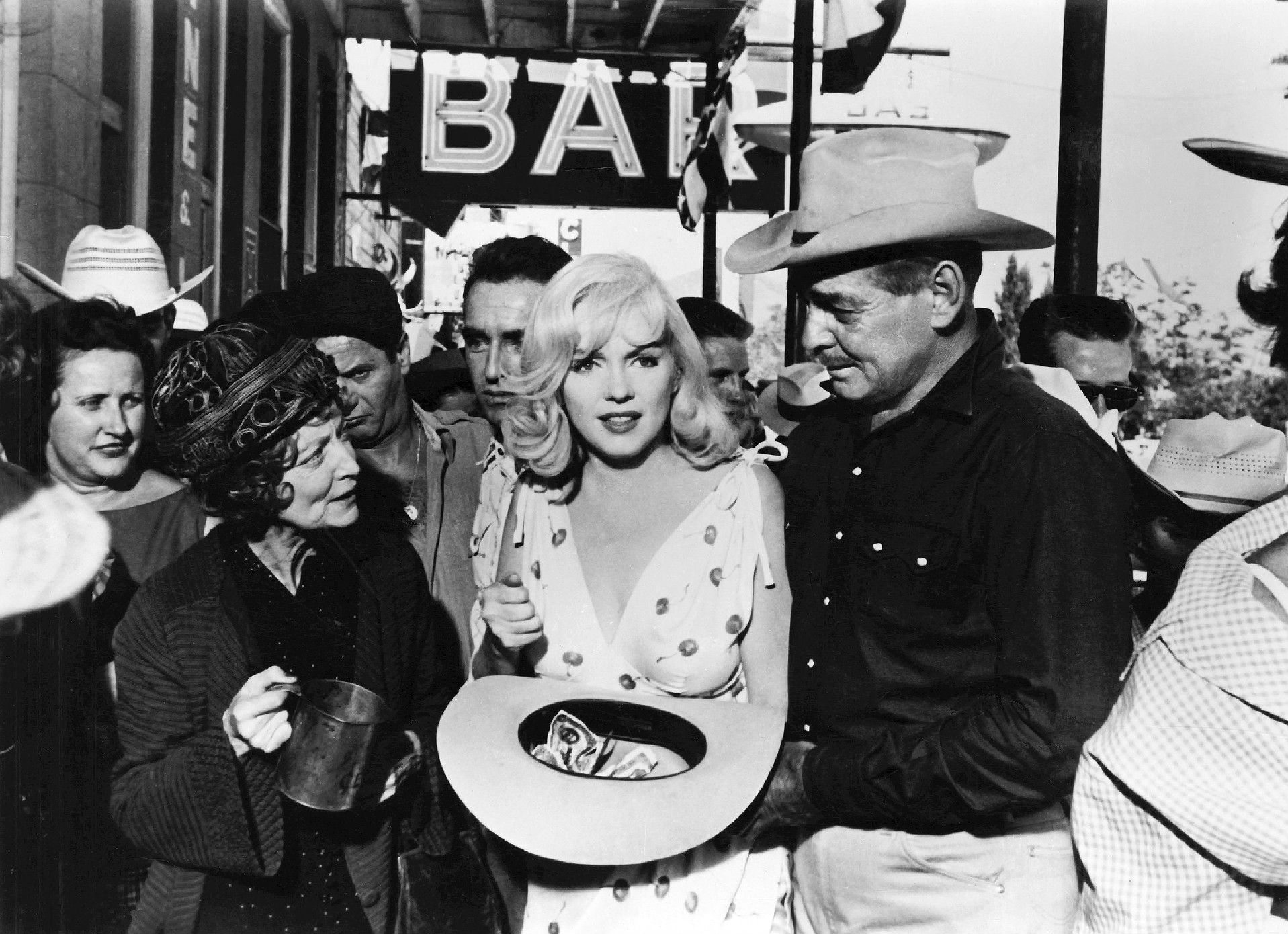
Gable and Marilyn Monroe in The Misfits (1961)

Table displaying films that actor Clark Gable appeared in
Year	Title	Role	Notes	Ref.
1924	White Man	Lady Andrea's Brother	Film debut, considered a lost film	
1924	Forbidden Paradise	Extra		
1924	The Iron Horse	Extra		
1925	The Merry Widow	Extra		
1925	The Plastic Age	Athlete		
1931	The Painted Desert	Rance Brett	Supporting role	
1931	The Easiest Way	Nick Feliki		
1931	Dance, Fools, Dance	Jake Luva		
1931	The Finger Points	Louis J. Blanco		
1931	The Secret Six	Carl Luckner	Supporting role	
1931	Laughing Sinners	Carl Loomis		
1931	A Free Soul	Ace Wilfong		
1931	Night Nurse	Nick		
1931	Sporting Blood	Warren "Rid" Riddell		
1931	Susan Lenox (Her Fall and Rise)	Rodney Spencer		
1931	Possessed	Mark Whitney		
1932	Hell Divers	C.P.O. Steve Nelson		
1932	Polly of the Circus	Reverend John Hartley		
1932	Red Dust	Dennis Carson		
1932	Strange Interlude	Dr. Ned Darrell		
1932	No Man of Her Own	Jerry "Babe" Stewart		
1933	The White Sister	Giovanni Severi		
1933	Hold Your Man	Eddie Hall		
1933	Night Flight	Jules Fabian		
1933	Dancing Lady	Patch Gallagher		
1934	It Happened One Night	Peter Warne		
1934	Men in White	Dr. George Ferguson		
1934	Manhattan Melodrama	Edward J. "Blackie" Gallagher		
1934	Chained	Michael "Mike" Bradley		
1934	Forsaking All Others	Jeffrey "Jeff" Williams		
1935	After Office Hours	James "Jim" Branch		
1935	Call of the Wild	Jack Thornton		
1935	China Seas	Captain Alan Gaskell		
1935	Mutiny on the Bounty	Fletcher Christian		
1936	Wife vs. Secretary	Van Stanhope		
1936	San Francisco	Blackie Norton		
1936	Cain and Mabel	Larry Cain		
1936	Love on the Run	Michael "Mike" Anthony		
1937	Parnell	Charles Stewart Parnell		
1937	Saratoga	Duke Bradley		
1938	Test Pilot	Jim Lane		
1938	Too Hot to Handle	Christopher "Chris" Hunter		
1939	Idiot's Delight	Harry Van	Gable performs Irving Berlin's "Puttin' On the Ritz".	
1939	Gone with the Wind	Rhett Butler		
1940	Strange Cargo	André Verne		
1940	Boom Town	Big John McMasters		
1940	Comrade X	McKinley B. "Mac" Thompson		
1941	They Met in Bombay	Gerald Meldrick		
1941	Honky Tonk	"Candy" Johnson		
1942	Somewhere I'll Find You	Jonathan "Jonny" Davis		
1945	Adventure	Harry Patterson		
1947	The Hucksters	Victor Albee Norman		
1948	Homecoming	Col. Ulysses Delby "Lee" Johnson		
1948	Command Decision	Brig. Gen. K. C. "Casey" Dennis		
1949	Any Number Can Play	Charley Enley Kyng		
1950	Key to the City	Steve Fisk		
1950	To Please a Lady	Mike Brannan		
1951	Across the Wide Missouri	Flint Mitchell		
1952	Lone Star	Devereaux Burke		
1953	Never Let Me Go	Philip Sutherland		
1953	Mogambo	Victor Marswell		
1954	Betrayed	Col. Pieter Deventer		
1955	Soldier of Fortune	Hank Lee		
1955	The Tall Men	Colonel Ben Allison		
1956	The King and Four Queens	Dan Kehoe	Also producer	
1957	Band of Angels	Hamish Bond		
1958	Run Silent, Run Deep	Cmdr. P. J. "Rich" Richardson		
1958	Teacher's Pet	James Gannon / James Gallagher		
1959	But Not for Me	Russell "Russ" Ward		
1960	It Started in Naples	Michael Hamilton		
1961	The Misfits	Gaylord "Gay" Langland	Posthumous release	

== World War II propaganda films ==
Wings Up (1942), narrated by Gable

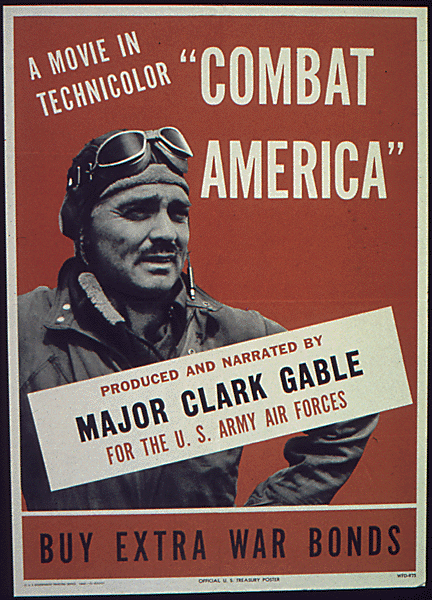
A poster for Combat America (1945)

Table displaying WW2 propaganda films that actor Clark Gable appeared in
Year	Title	Role	Notes	Ref.
1942	Show Business at War	Himself		
1942	Wings Up	Narrator		
1945	Combat America	Narrator	Also produced	

== Short films ==
Table displaying short films that actor Clark Gable appeared in
Year	Title	Role	Notes	Ref.
1931	The Christmas Party	Himself		
1935	Starlit Days at the Lido	Himself		
1936	The Candid Camera Story	Himself		
1937	Hollywood Party	Himself		
1938	Hollywood Goes to Town	Himself		
1939	Hollywood Hobbies	Himself		
1940	Northward, Ho!	Himself	Archival footage, a behind-the-scenes look at the making of Northwest Passage (1940)	
1941	You Can't Fool a Camera	Himself		
1950	Screen Actors	Himself		
