= Joan Crawford filmography =

List of film appearances of American actress Joan Crawford

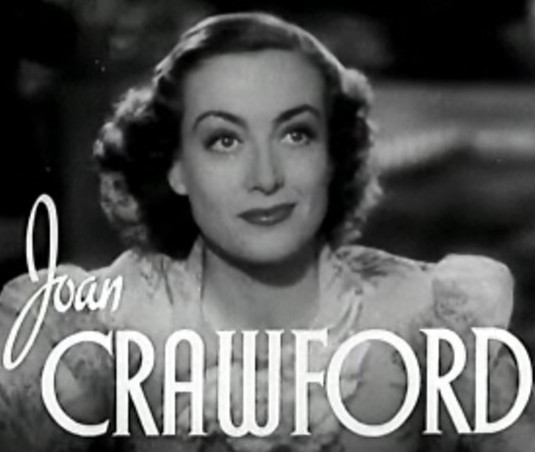
Crawford in The Last of Mrs. Cheyney (1937)

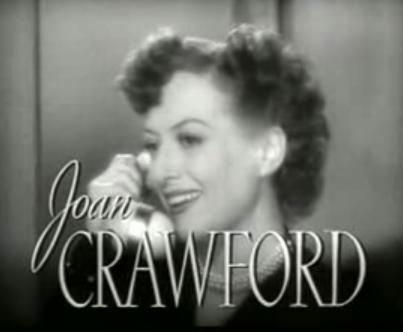
Crawford in The Women (1939)

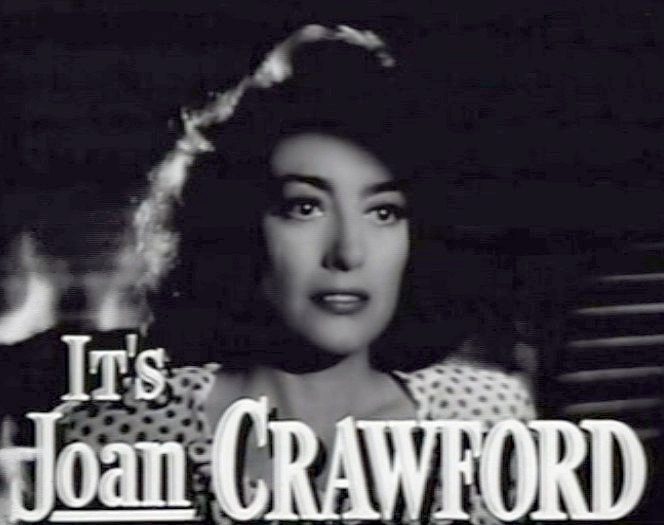
Crawford in Mildred Pierce (1945)

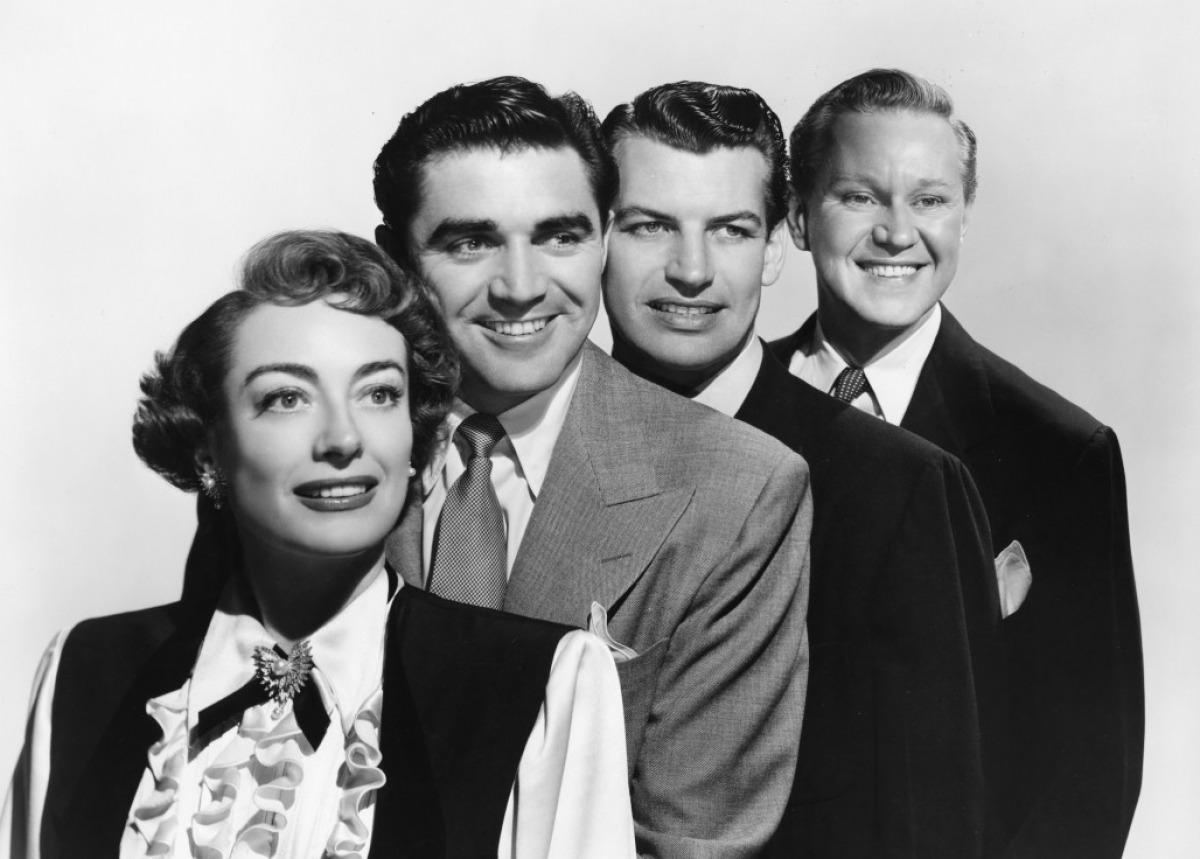
L-R: Crawford, Steve Cochran, Richard Egan, and David Brian in The Damned Don't Cry (1950)

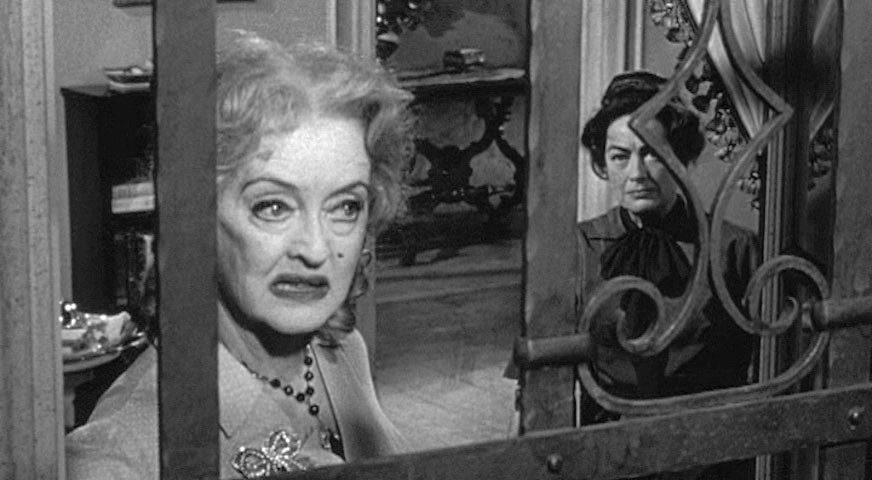
Crawford and Bette Davis in What Ever Happened to Baby Jane? (1962)

The Joan Crawford filmography lists the film appearances of American actress Joan Crawford, who starred in numerous feature films throughout a lengthy career that spanned nearly five decades.

She made her film debut in Lady of the Night (1925), as a body double for film star Norma Shearer. She appeared in several other films, before she made her major breakthrough playing Lon Chaney's love interest in the 1927 horror film The Unknown. Her major success in Our Dancing Daughters (1928) made her a popular flapper of the late 1920s. Her first sound film, Untamed (1929), was a critical and box office success.

Crawford would become a highly popular actress throughout the 1930s, as a leading lady for Metro-Goldwyn-Mayer. She starred in a series of "rags-to-riches" films that were extremely popular during the Depression-era, most especially with women. Her popularity rivaled fellow MGM actresses, including Greta Garbo, Norma Shearer, and Jean Harlow. She appeared in eight movies with Clark Gable, including romantic drama Possessed (1931), musical film Dancing Lady (1933), romantic comedy Love on the Run (1936), and romantic drama Strange Cargo (1940), among others. In 1937, she was proclaimed the first "Queen of the Movies" by Life magazine, but her popularity soon waned. In May 1938, Crawford – along with Greta Garbo, Katharine Hepburn, Fred Astaire, Kay Francis, and many others – was labeled "box office poison"; an actor whose "box office draw is nil".

Crawford managed to make a comeback in the comedy The Women (1939), opposite an all-star female-only cast. On July 1, 1943, Crawford was released from Louis B. Mayer, due to creative differences, and signed an exclusive contract with Warner Brothers, where she became a rival of Bette Davis. After a slow start with the studio, she received critical and commercial acclaim for her performance in the drama Mildred Pierce (1945). The film earned her an Academy Award for Best Actress. From 1946 to 1952, Crawford appeared in a series of critical and box office successes, including the musical drama Humoresque (1946), film noirs Possessed (1947, for which she received a second Academy Award nomination) and Flamingo Road (1949), drama The Damned Don't Cry (1950), and romantic comedy Goodbye, My Fancy (1951), among others. She received a third – and final – Academy Award nomination for her performance in the thriller Sudden Fear (1952).

In 1953, Crawford starred in the musical Torch Song, her final film role for MGM. Her next film, Johnny Guitar (1954), although not originally a hit, has become considered a classic. During the latter half of the 1950s, Crawford starred in a series of B-movies, including romantic dramas Female on the Beach (1955) and Autumn Leaves (1956). In 1962, Crawford was teamed with Bette Davis, in a film adaptation of What Ever Happened to Baby Jane? (1962). The thriller film was a box office hit, and briefly revived Crawford's career. Her final film performance was in the British science fiction film, Trog (1970).

== Filmography ==
=== Feature films ===
Silent films
Year	Title	Role	Director	Studio
1925	Lady of the Night	Double for Norma Shearer	Monta Bell	Metro-Goldwyn-Mayer
1925	Proud Flesh	Party Guest	King Vidor	Metro-Goldwyn-Mayer
1925	A Slave of Fashion^{‡}	Mannequin	Hobart Henley	Metro-Goldwyn-Mayer
1925	The Merry Widow	Ballroom Dancer	Erich von Stroheim	Metro-Goldwyn-Mayer
1925	Pretty Ladies	Bobby, a Showgirl	Monta Bell	Metro-Goldwyn-Mayer
1925	The Circle	Young Lady Catherine	Frank Borzage	Metro-Goldwyn-Mayer
1925	The Midshipman	Extra	Christy Cabanne	Metro-Goldwyn-Mayer
1925	Ben-Hur: A Tale of the Christ	Chariot Race Spectator	Fred Niblo	Metro-Goldwyn-Mayer
1925	Old Clothes	Mary Riley	Edward F. Cline	Metro-Goldwyn-Mayer
1925	The Only Thing	Party Guest	Jack Conway	Metro-Goldwyn-Mayer
1925	Sally, Irene and Mary	Irene	Edmund Goulding	Metro-Goldwyn-Mayer
1926	Tramp, Tramp, Tramp	Betty Burton	Harry Edwards	First National
1926	The Boob	Jane	William A. Wellman	Metro-Goldwyn-Mayer
1926	Paris	The Girl	Edmund Goulding	Metro-Goldwyn-Mayer
1927	Winners of the Wilderness	René Contrecoeur	W. S. Van Dyke	Metro-Goldwyn-Mayer
1927	The Taxi Dancer	Joslyn Poe	Harry F. Millarde	Metro-Goldwyn-Mayer
1927	The Understanding Heart	Monica Dale	Jack Conway	Metro-Goldwyn-Mayer
1927	The Unknown	Nanon	Tod Browning	Metro-Goldwyn-Mayer
1927	Twelve Miles Out	Jane	Jack Conway	Metro-Goldwyn-Mayer
1927	Spring Fever	Allie Monte	Edward Sedgwick	Metro-Goldwyn-Mayer
1928	West Point	Betty Channing	Edward Sedgwick	Metro-Goldwyn-Mayer
1928	The Law of the Range	Betty Dallas	William Nigh	Metro-Goldwyn-Mayer
1928	Rose-Marie^{‡}	Rose-Marie	Lucien Hubbard	Metro-Goldwyn-Mayer
1928	Across to Singapore	Priscilla Crowninshield	William Nigh	Metro-Goldwyn-Mayer
1928	Four Walls^{‡}	Frieda	William Nigh	Metro-Goldwyn-Mayer
1928	Our Dancing Daughters	Diana Medford	Harry Beaumont	Metro-Goldwyn-Mayer
1928	Dream of Love^{‡}	Adrienne Lecouvreur	Fred Niblo	Metro-Goldwyn-Mayer
1929	The Duke Steps Out^{‡}	Susie	James Cruze	Metro-Goldwyn-Mayer
1929	Our Modern Maidens	Billie Brown	Jack Conway	Metro-Goldwyn-Mayer

‡ denotes lost film

Sound films
Year	Title	Role	Director	Studio
1929	The Hollywood Revue of 1929	Herself (performer)	Charles Reisner	Metro-Goldwyn-Mayer
1929	Untamed	Alice "Bingo" Dowling	Jack Conway	Metro-Goldwyn-Mayer
1930	Montana Moon	Joan "Montana" Prescott	Malcolm St. Clair	Metro-Goldwyn-Mayer
1930	Our Blushing Brides	Gerry Marsh	Harry Beaumont	Metro-Goldwyn-Mayer
1930	Paid	Mary Turner	Sam Wood	Metro-Goldwyn-Mayer
1931	Dance, Fools, Dance	Bonnie Jordan	Harry Beaumont	Metro-Goldwyn-Mayer
1931	Laughing Sinners	Ivy Stevens	Harry Beaumont	Metro-Goldwyn-Mayer
1931	This Modern Age	Val Winters	Nick Grinde	Metro-Goldwyn-Mayer
1931	Possessed	Marian Martin	Clarence Brown	Metro-Goldwyn-Mayer
1932	Grand Hotel	Flaemmchen	Edmund Goulding	Metro-Goldwyn-Mayer
1932	Letty Lynton	Letty Lynton	Clarence Brown	Metro-Goldwyn-Mayer
1932	Rain	Sadie Thompson	Lewis Milestone	United Artists
1933	Today We Live	Diana "Ann" Boyce-Smith	Howard Hawks	Metro-Goldwyn-Mayer
1933	Dancing Lady	Janie "Duchess" Barlow	Robert Z. Leonard	Metro-Goldwyn-Mayer
1934	Sadie McKee	Sadie McKee Brennan	Clarence Brown	Metro-Goldwyn-Mayer
1934	Chained	Diane "Dinah" Lovering	Clarence Brown	Metro-Goldwyn-Mayer
1934	Forsaking All Others	Mary Clay	W. S. Van Dyke	Metro-Goldwyn-Mayer
1935	No More Ladies	Marcia Townsend	Edward H. Griffith	Metro-Goldwyn-Mayer
1935	I Live My Life	Kay Bentley	W. S. Van Dyke	Metro-Goldwyn-Mayer
1936	The Gorgeous Hussy	Margaret "Peggy" O'Neal	Clarence Brown	Metro-Goldwyn-Mayer
1936	Love on the Run	Sally Parker	W. S. Van Dyke	Metro-Goldwyn-Mayer
1937	The Last of Mrs. Cheyney	Fay Cheyney	Richard Boleslawski	Metro-Goldwyn-Mayer
1937	The Bride Wore Red	Anni Pavlovitch	Dorothy Arzner	Metro-Goldwyn-Mayer
1937	Mannequin	Jessica Cassidy	Frank Borzage	Metro-Goldwyn-Mayer
1938	The Shining Hour	Olivia Riley	Frank Borzage	Metro-Goldwyn-Mayer
1939	The Ice Follies of 1939	Mary McKay	Reinhold Schünzel	Metro-Goldwyn-Mayer
1939	The Women	Crystal Allen	George Cukor	Metro-Goldwyn-Mayer
1940	Strange Cargo	Julie	Frank Borzage	Metro-Goldwyn-Mayer
1940	Susan and God	Susan Trexel	George Cukor	Metro-Goldwyn-Mayer
1941	A Woman's Face	Anna Holm	George Cukor	Metro-Goldwyn-Mayer
1941	When Ladies Meet	Mary Howard	Robert Z. Leonard	Metro-Goldwyn-Mayer
1942	They All Kissed the Bride	Margaret Drew	Alexander Hall	Columbia
1942	Reunion in France	Michele de la Becque	Jules Dassin	Metro-Goldwyn-Mayer
1943	Above Suspicion	Frances Myles	Richard Thorpe	Metro-Goldwyn-Mayer
1944	Hollywood Canteen	Herself (cameo role)	Delmer Daves	Warner Bros.
1945	Mildred Pierce	Mildred Pierce	Michael Curtiz	Warner Bros.
1946	Humoresque	Helen Wright	Jean Negulesco	Warner Bros.
1947	Possessed	Louise Howell	Curtis Bernhardt	Warner Bros.
1947	Daisy Kenyon	Daisy Kenyon	Otto Preminger	20th Century Fox
1949	Flamingo Road	Lane Bellamy	Michael Curtiz	Warner Bros.
1949	It's a Great Feeling	Herself (cameo role)	David Butler	Warner Bros.
1950	The Damned Don't Cry	Ethel Whitehead	Vincent Sherman	Warner Bros.
1950	Harriet Craig	Harriet Craig	Vincent Sherman	Columbia
1951	Goodbye, My Fancy	Agatha Reed	Vincent Sherman	Warner Bros.
1952	This Woman Is Dangerous	Beth Austin	Felix E. Feist	Warner Bros.
1952	Sudden Fear	Myra Hudson	David Miller	RKO
1953	Torch Song	Jenny Stewart	Charles Walters	Metro-Goldwyn-Mayer
1954	Johnny Guitar	Vienna	Nicholas Ray	Republic
1955	Female on the Beach	Lynn Markham	Joseph Pevney	Universal
1955	Queen Bee	Eva Phillips	Ranald MacDougall	Columbia
1956	Autumn Leaves	Millicent "Milly" Wetherby	Robert Aldrich	Columbia
1957	The Story of Esther Costello	Margaret Landi	David Miller	Columbia
1959	The Best of Everything	Amanda Farrow	Jean Negulesco	20th Century Fox
1962	What Ever Happened to Baby Jane?	Blanche Hudson	Robert Aldrich	Seven Arts
1963	The Caretakers	Lucretia Terry	Hall Bartlett	United Artists
1964	Strait-Jacket	Lucy Harbin	William Castle	Columbia
1965	I Saw What You Did	Amy Nelson	William Castle	Universal
1967	The Karate Killers	Amanda True	Barry Shear	Metro-Goldwyn-Mayer
1967	Berserk!	Monica Rivers	Jim O'Connolly	Columbia
1970	Trog	Dr. Brockton	Freddie Francis	Warner Bros.

=== Short subjects ===
Year	Title	Role	Director	Studio
1925	MGM Studio Tour	Herself	–	Metro-Goldwyn-Mayer
1925	Miss MGM	Miss MGM	–	Metro-Goldwyn-Mayer
1930	Hollywood Snapshots #11	Herself	Ralph Staub	Columbia
1931	The Slippery Pearls	Herself	William C. McGann	Paramount
1932	Screen Snapshots	Herself	Ralph Staub	Columbia
1947	The Jimmy Fund	Herself	–	Columbia
1958	Hollywood Mothers and Fathers	Herself	–	Columbia
1972	A Very Special Child	Narrator	–	American Cancer Society

=== Box Office Ranking ===
- 1929 - 15th
- 1930 - 1st
- 1931 - 3rd
- 1932 - 3rd
- 1933 - 10th
- 1934 - 6th
- 1935 - 5th
- 1936 - 7th
- 1937 - 16th
- 1947 - 21st

== Archival footage ==
Year	Title	Role	Director	Studio
1964	Four Days in November	Herself	Mel Stuart	United Artists
1964	MGM's Big Parade of Comedy	Herself	Robert Youngson	Metro-Goldwyn-Mayer
1974	That's Entertainment!	Janie Barlow (Dancing Lady)	Jack Haley Jr.	Metro-Goldwyn-Mayer
1984	Terror in the Aisles	Blanche Hudson (What Ever Happened to Baby Jane?)	Andrew J. Kuehn	Universal
1985	That's Dancing!	Herself	Jack Haley Jr.	Metro-Goldwyn-Mayer
1994	That's Entertainment! III	Jenny Stewart (Torch Song)	Bud Friedgen, Michael J. Sheridan	Metro-Goldwyn-Mayer

== Uncompleted films ==
Year	Title	Role	Director	Studio
1929	Tide of Empire	Josephita (replaced by Renée Adorée)	Allan Dwan	Metro-Goldwyn-Mayer
1930	Great Day	Susie Totheridge	Harry Beaumont	Metro-Goldwyn-Mayer
1930	The March of Time	Herself	Charles Reisner	Metro-Goldwyn-Mayer
1964	Hush...Hush, Sweet Charlotte	Miriam Deering (replaced by Olivia de Havilland due to illness)	Robert Aldrich	20th Century Fox

== Television ==
Year	Title	Role	Director	Episodes and notes
1953	The Revlon Mirror Theater	Margaret Hughes	Rod Amateau	"Because I Love Him"
1954	General Electric Theater	Mary Andrews	Rod Amateau	"The Road to Edinburgh"
1958	General Electric Theater	Ruth Marshall	Herschel Daugherty	"Strange Witness"
1959	The Joan Crawford Show	Susan Conrad	Dick Powell	"Woman on the Run" (pilot)
1959	General Electric Theater	Ann Howard	Herschel Daugherty	"And One Was Loyal"
1959	Zane Grey Theatre	Stella Faring	Don Medford	"Rebel Range"
1961	Zane Grey Theatre	Sarah and Melanie Hobbes	Lewis Allen	"One Must Die"
1961	The DuPont Show of the Week	Hostess	James Elson	"The Ziegfeld Touch"
1963	Route 66	Morgan Matheson Harper	Philip Leacock	"Same Picture, Different Frame"
1964	Della	Della Chappell	Robert Gist	TV movie
1967	The Man from U.N.C.L.E.	Amanda True	Barry Shear	"The Five Daughters Affair: Part 1"
1967	Easter Island	Narrator (voice)	José Gómez-Sicre	TV documentary
1968	The Lucy Show	Herself (guest star)	Jack Donohue	"Lucy and the Lost Star"
1968	The Secret Storm	Joan Borman Kane #2	Gloria Monty	Daytime serial (5 episodes)
1969	Garbo	Hostess / Narrator	Fred Burnley	TV documentary
1969	Night Gallery	Claudia Menlo	Steven Spielberg	TV movie (segment: "Eyes")
1970	The Virginian	Stephanie White	Robert Gist	"Nightmare"
1970	The Tim Conway Show	Herself (cameo)	Alan Rafkin	"To Cuba with Love"
1970	The Tim Conway Comedy Hour	Herself (guest star)	Bill Hobin	"Episode #1.3"
1972	The Sixth Sense	Joan Fairchild	John Newland	"Dear Joan: We're Going to Scare You to Death"
1973	Journey to the Unknown	Herself (hostess)	Michael Lindsay-Hogg, Don Chaffey	TV movie

== Awards and nominations ==
Year	Award	Category	Work	Result	Ref.
1945	National Board of Review Awards	Best Actress	Mildred Pierce	Won	
1946	Academy Awards	Best Actress	Mildred Pierce	Won	
1946	New York Film Critics Circle Awards	Best Actress	Mildred Pierce	Nominated	
1948	Academy Awards	Best Actress	Possessed	Nominated	
1950	Photoplay Awards	Five Most Popular Performances By A Motion Picture Actress	The Damned Don't Cry	Won	
1953	Academy Awards	Best Actress	Sudden Fear	Nominated	
1953	Golden Globe Awards	Best Actress – Drama	Sudden Fear	Nominated	
1953	Photoplay Awards	Five Most Popular Performances By A Motion Picture Actress	Sudden Fear	Won	
1953	Laurel Awards	Best Dramatic Performance, Female	Sudden Fear	Won	
1953	Laurel Awards	5-Year Laurel Award - Topliner Dramatic Role	Sudden Fear	Won	
1954	Laurel Awards	Top Female Musical Performance	Torch Song	Won	
1960	Hollywood Walk of Fame	Star of Motion Picture	—N/a	Honored	
1963	BAFTA Film Awards	Best Foreign Actress	What Ever Happened to Baby Jane?	Nominated	
1970	Golden Globe Awards	Cecil B. DeMille Award	—N/a	Honored	

=== Philanthropic Awards ===
Year	Award	Reason/Recognition
1952	Shoe and Leg Brace	Continued support the Texas Theatres Crippled Children's Fund
1959	Hebrew-English Bible	Humanitarian efforts involving the Jewish people
1963	City of Hope Award	Donation of time and funds to the City of Hope Hospital
1964	Honorary Hoosier Award	Devotion to humanitarian, arts, and business causes
1965	USO Award of the Year	Accomplishments as an actress, executive, and humanitarian First female USO Award of The Year winner
1965	Heart of the World Award	Continued support of the City of Hope Hospital
