= Strange Cargo (1940 film) =

1940 film by Frank Borzage

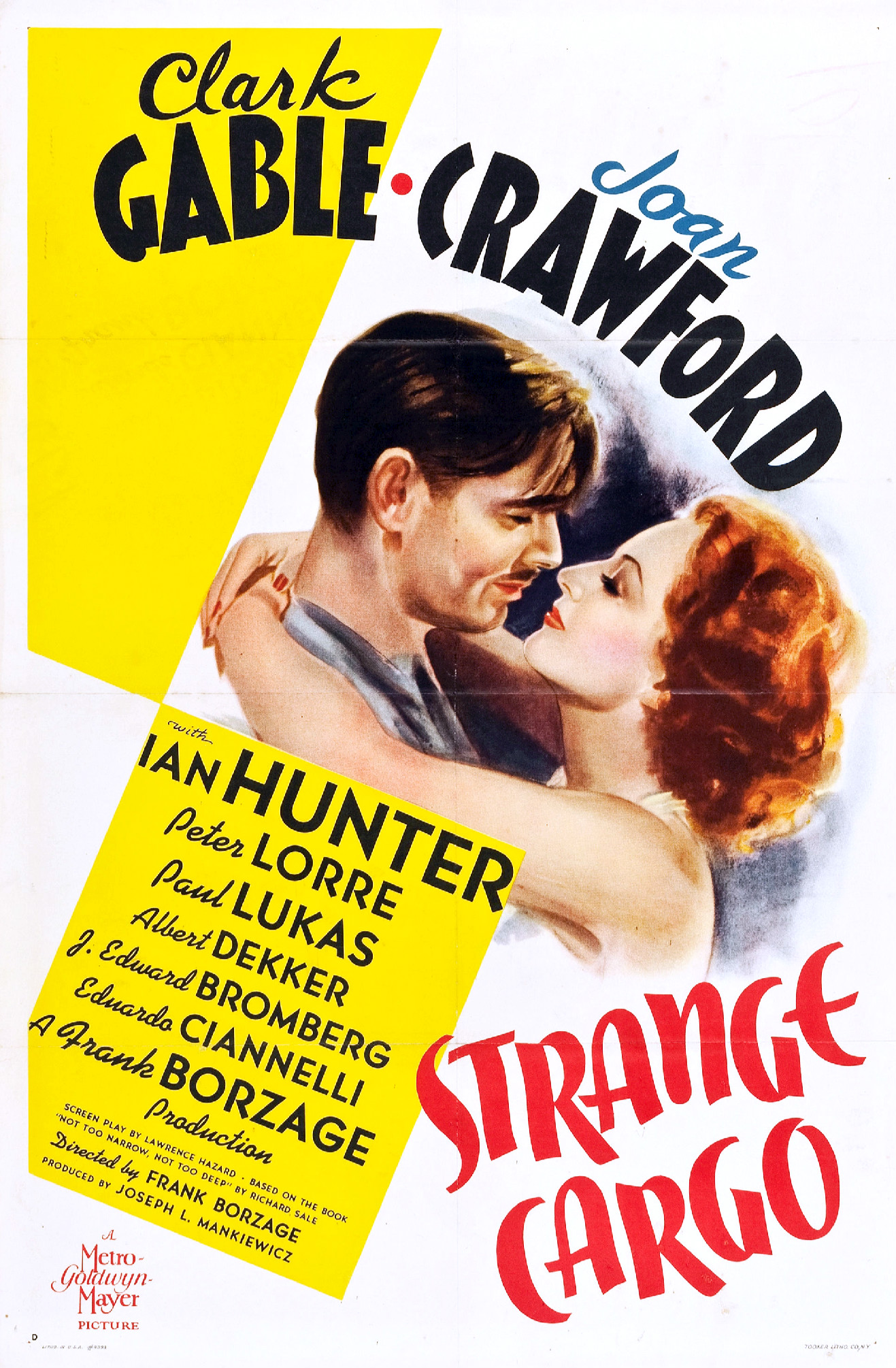
- Original theatrical poster
- Directed by: Frank Borzage
- Written by: Lawrence Hazard; Lesser Samuels
- Based on: Not Too Narrow, Not Too Deep; 1936 novel by Richard Sale
- Produced by: Joseph L. Mankiewicz
- Starring: Clark Gable; Joan Crawford; Peter Lorre
- Cinematography: Robert H. Planck
- Edited by: Robert J. Kern
- Music by: Franz Waxman
- Production company: Metro-Goldwyn-Mayer
- Distributed by: Loew's Inc.
- Release dates: March 12, 1940 (Los Angeles); April 25, 1940 (New York)
- Running time: 113 minutes
- Country: United States
- Language: English
- Budget: $1.25 million
- Box office: $1.9 million

Strange Cargo is a 1940 American romantic drama film directed by Frank Borzage and starring Clark Gable and Joan Crawford in a story about a group of fugitive prisoners from a French penal colony. The adapted screenplay by Lawrence Hazard was based upon the 1936 novel Not Too Narrow, Not Too Deep by Richard Sale. The film was produced by Joseph L. Mankiewicz for Metro-Goldwyn-Mayer and was the eighth and final film pairing of Crawford and Gable, and the first Gable film released in the wake of Gone with the Wind. The supporting cast includes Ian Hunter, Paul Lukas, Eduardo Ciannelli and Peter Lorre.

== Plot ==
Julie is a cynical working girl in a café in a town near Devil's Island (French Guiana) penal colony. While on a work shift just after being released from 30 days in solitary confinement, prisoner André Verne sees her on the wharf. She is unfriendly, but Verne is attracted to her, and arranges to escape long enough to visit her in her cabin. Verne's absence is not noticed because a man in a prisoner’s uniform joins the returning work crew, making the count correct. Verne goes to Julie's room but she wants none of him and threatens to turn him in rather than risk being thrown off the island if found consorting with a prisoner. She doesn’t get the chance because M'sieu Pig has already reported Verne, who is found in Julie's room and returned to prison. She is banished from the island but has no money for passage. Pig wants her to stay but she tells him nothing could ever make her so desperate that she would allow him to touch her. She goes to Marfeu for help and ends up held prisoner in his shack.

Prison warden Grideau is mystified by the fact that the work gang count was correct despite Verne's absence. Grideau thinks that Verne has potential, unlike most of the prisoners but fears the man is doomed. It is only a matter of time before he kills someone. In the prison barracks, the stranger, whose name is Cambreau, begins to show the qualities that begin to define him as a mysterious, supernatural character: his anticipation of events (including weather), his knowledge of people, his physical endurance, his readiness with appropriate quotes from scripture, even his unexplained possession of money when needed. In a conversation with Verne, he offers the idea, central to the film, that "every man has God in his heart". Verne finds this wildly funny, pointing to all the wonderful examples of God around them. Moll has masterminded a jailbreak and takes Cambreau, Telez, Hessler, a serial killer who poisons his wives, Flaubert, and Dufond with him. Verne and Moll are bitter enemies, but in spite of this—or because of it—Verne plans to catch up with them and join in.

The trek through the jungle is brutal. They need food, and Cambreau, who never tires, strides off purposefully into the undergrowth. Julie has been fighting with Marfeu, who caught her packing a sack with food, trying to get away. Her arm is raised to stab him to death when Cambreau's voice is heard saying, “Not that way, Julie.” When she goes to look there is no one, but the sack is gone and there is a wad of money, enough for a passage to the mainland. Marfeu takes it. Later, while Julie is begging him to let her go — hasn’t she been there long enough? — Verne bursts in. He takes the money from Marfeu and takes Julie with him. She makes it clear she is going as he is the best thing available at the moment but will ditch him if something better comes along. They understand each other perfectly. Soon after, Cambreau returns with the supplies. Then Verne appears and joins the escapees.

When they reach the coast, they are barely able to stand from thirst and exhaustion — except for Cambreau. He stops Moll from drinking seawater, and somehow knows the boat that has been hidden for them is around the next point. Refreshed by the water hidden there, they set sail for the mainland. Then during a long, deadly, calm, Julie shares her ugly past, her new hopes, her love for Verne and her fears for him. She could gladly spend her life with him but not on the deadly path he is on. She wishes she could pray, and Cambreau gently tells her that she has been.

Only Verne, Julie, Hessler, and Cambreau survive the long ordeal. The others die, some heroically, all receiving consolation from Cambreau. Once ashore, they set the boat adrift with Moll's body in it, hoping the authorities will assume that there were no survivors of the prison break. Cambreau takes them to a fisherman’s hut where they take refuge, washing, shaving, replacing their rags with clean clothes. The fisherman denies having a boat until Verne threatens him with a razor. In the port on the mainland, Grideau and his men, accompanied by Pig, examine the boat with Moll's body in it. As the escapees hoped, they believe that all died, but Pig finds a scrap of Julie's dress and knows better. Hessler leaves them, announcing that he is off to find a rich widow — his next victim. He is proud of having escaped Cambreau's net and disdains Cambreau's salvation, bidding him a mocking au revoir. Cambreau gravely replies that they will not meet again. Once outside, Hessler pauses and looks back, struggling against belief and then, grimacing demonically, slinks off into the night as a storm begins.

Julie is on the waterfront, looking for passage on a ship in the harbor, but no one will row her out: The weather is bad and getting worse. Pig sees her and threatens to expose Verne unless she agrees to go back to the island with him—and marry him. She scorns him at first, but realizing this is Verne’s only hope, she agrees, on condition that she be allowed to say goodbye, alone. Her conversation with Verne is agonizing, and when Pig comes into the hut, Verne assumes the worst. In the end, Julie goes with Pig. Cambreau is now the only person who knows Verne is alive and Verne will feel safer if he is dead. Despite the terrible weather, they row out to the boat with the fisherman. It is not until after they get there that Cambreau says he should stay behind; there are people he might help. Verne decides to kill him, and punches him in the jaw, deliberately knocking him overboard into the crashing waves. Cambreau clings to a piece of driftwood, evoking the image of Christ on Calvary's cross. The fisherman says Verne is the only one who can save Cambreau. But Verne taunts the drowning man, demanding to know where God is now, saying “the fisherman is God! I'm God! You're... You're....", but Cambreau goes under as he is shouting. Verne freezes in horror. Desperately calling Cambreau's name, he dives into the raging sea to save him. Back on deck, Verne thinks Cambreau is dead and asks him why. Then, Cambreau opens his eyes and Verne, weeping, embraces him.

It is a bright day. The storm has cleared and Julie, Pig and Grideau are on the deck of the steamer that will take them back to the island. Julie sees Verne walking confidently along the wharf toward the ship and runs out to stop him. He keeps on coming and, full of banter as usual, surrenders to Grideau. Repentant but still cocky, he jokes that a woman like Julie was all the warden really needed to keep him in line. She will wait for him, and they will be married after he has served his term. Across the harbor, the fisherman and Cambreau, aboard the former's boat, watch the steamer. The fisherman asks if they will be all right eventually, and Cambreau replies that all is well now. He says "Goodbye, my friend", to the fisherman, who removes his hat and replies, "Goodbye, Monsieur". Cambreau grips the other man’s shoulder in farewell and strides off down the deck to disappear into the shadows where there is no passage. The gently smiling fisherman slowly makes the sign of the cross on his breast.

== Cast ==
- Clark Gable as André Verne
- Joan Crawford as Julie
- Ian Hunter as Cambreau
- Peter Lorre as M'sieu Pig
- Paul Lukas as Hessler
- Albert Dekker as Moll
- J. Edward Bromberg as Flaubert
- Eduardo Ciannelli as Telez
- John Arledge as Dufond
- Frederick Worlock as Grideau (billed as Frederic Worlock)
- Bernard Nedell as Marfeu
- Victor Varconi as Fisherman
- Paul Fix as Benet

== Production ==
Censorship issues plagued the film from the beginning, not only in terms of its sex and violence but also because of the mystical element. The Catholic Legion of Decency gave it a "condemned" rating for presenting "a naturalistic concept of religion contrary to the teachings of Christ, irreverent use of Scripture, and lustful complications." The picture was banned in some places, and this had an adverse effect on the box office.

Producer Joseph L. Mankiewicz later lamented: "It was almost a good film. I wish it could have been made later. It was tough doing any kind of film that even approached reality in any way."

== Reception ==
In a contemporary review for The New York Times, critic B. R. Crisler called Strange Cargo a "long and violent melodrama" and wrote that Gable's and Crawford's star power diminish the importance of the film's most important character of Cambreau, played by the much less known Ian Hunter: "[W]hen Mr. Hunter walks into the picture, ... something more should have been made of him than simply an unaccountable stooge to cover Mr. Gable's amorous adventurings with Miss Crawford in the town cabaret. ... [T]he ultimate result of his labors and teachings in behalf of the erring mortals who surround him is the usual melodramatic ending ... Anything else, of course, would have been a miracle which even the miraculous Cambreau could hardly have been expected to accomplish."

Critic Philip K. Scheuer of the Los Angeles Times wrote: "The picture is sometimes hard put to balance the metaphysical against the physical, for it is one of those concepts which might have easily aroused laughter in the wrong places. Because it walks this emotional tight rope so dexterously, sometimes regaining its equilibrium only by the narrowest of margins—but regaining it!—the production emerges in toto as a uniquely melodramatic tour de force."

Variety commented: "Although the picture has its many deficiencies, the Crawford characterization will give studio execs idea of proper casting of her talents for the future. Direction by Frank Borzage fails to hit the dramatic punches...He has not clearly defined the spiritual redemption angle, which also adds to the audience confusion. The screenplay does not help Borzage out of his predicament."

Leonard Maltin describes Strange Cargo as an “Intriguing allegorical film ... Not for all tastes, but there are fine, realistic performances and [a] flavorful Franz Waxman score.

According to MGM records, the film earned $1,311,000 in the U.S. and Canada and $603,000 elsewhere.

== See also ==
- Clark Gable filmography
- Joan Crawford filmography
