= John Lee Mahin =

American screenwriter (1902–1984)

John Lee Mahin (August 23, 1902, Evanston, Illinois – April 18, 1984, Los Angeles, California) was an American screenwriter and producer of films who was active in Hollywood from the 1930s to the 1960s. He was known as the favorite writer of Clark Gable and Victor Fleming. In the words of one profile, he had "a flair for rousing adventure material, and at the same time he wrote some of the raciest and most sophisticated sexual comedies of that period."

== Biography ==
Mahin was born in Winnetka, Illinois in 1902, the son of John Lee Mahin Sr. (1869–1930), a Chicago newspaper and advertising man, and Julia Graham Snitzler. Mahin attended Harvard University; while there, he reviewed movies and plays for the Boston American at $30 a week. Mahin worked as a journalist for two years in New York, at the Sun, the Post and the City News. He called this valuable training "because you’ve got to write something every day. Whether you like it or not, you’ve just got to write. Getting your stuff edited, you learn terseness. You realize how important editing is."

Mahin tried to make a living as an actor, starting as a chorus boy in a production of Gilbert and Sullivan's Patience at the Province Playhouse. "I knew I wasn't good. I quit because other people didn’t think I was good. But, boy, did it get me around the theatre! I learned a lot." He eventually moved into advertising in New York but wrote fiction on the side.

Mahin became friendly with Ben Hecht and Charles MacArthur, who he would meet on the ferry while commuting to work in New York. Hecht read Mahin's stories and encouraged him to move to Hollywood.

=== Early screenwriting ===
Hecht and MacArthur were working on The Unholy Garden (1931) for Sam Goldwyn and brought in Mahin to help at $200 a week. Mahin later said "I didn't do a helluva lot of work, because to try to do Ben's work for him is silly. I don’t know why he brought me out. I'd try to work, and he'd say, "No, no," and then he'd sit down and rattle off something."

Nonetheless Heckt liked his work and when Hecht went on to the gangster movie Scarface (1932), he took Mahin with him. Mahin wrote the script in collaboration with Hecht, Seton I. Miller and the director Howard Hawks (W. R. Burnett had done an earlier draft).

=== MGM ===
It took a while for Scarface to be released but advance word was strong and MGM offered Mahin a long-term contract at $200 a week. They assigned him to a gangster film, Beast of the City (1932) which starred Jean Harlow. While working on Howard Hawks asked him to do some uncredited work on Tiger Shark (1932) at Warner Bros; Mahin did it in the evenings.

Mahin wrote The Wet Parade (1932) his first movie with director Victor Fleming. The two men had a huge hit with Red Dust (1932), which helped make a star out of Clark Gable.

Mahin did some work on Rasputin and the Empress (1933), then Hell Below (1933) (in which he also appeared as an actor), Bombshell (1933) for Fleming, The Prizefighter and the Lady (1933) and Eskimo (1933); Mahin claims to have done some directing on the latter. "I used to go down and direct quite a lot. I did stuff when I was working with [the producer] Hunt Stromberg, because the directors were off on other pictures."

Other credits included Laughing Boy (1934), which Mahin says he had encouraged MGM to buy and which he described as "awful" disliking the ending and the male star Ramon Navarro. He wrote Treasure Island (1934) for Fleming, and Chained (1934). He adapted the operetta Naughty Marietta (1935) and did uncredited work on China Seas (1935).

Mahin then wrote Riffraff (1936), Wife vs. Secretary (1936), Small Town Girl (1936), The Devil Is a Sissy (1936), and Love on the Run (1936).

He was Oscar nominated for his work on Captains Courageous (1937) for Fleming. Mahin wrote The Last Gangster (1937), then did two Gable films, Test Pilot (1938), and Too Hot to Handle (1938). In 1937 MGM paid him $56,000.

With Fleming, Mahin did uncredited work on The Wizard of Oz (1939) and worked for about a week on Gone with the Wind (1939).

Mahin did another for Gable, Boom Town (1940) and was reunited with Fleming on Dr. Jekyll and Mr. Hyde (1941). In July 1940 it was reported MGM had paid him $80,833 for the previous year.

He did a gangster film for Mervyn LeRoy, Johnny Eager (1941) and some uncredited work on the ending of Woman of the Year (1942) Mahin adapted Tortilla Flat (1943) and worked on the British film The Adventures of Tartu (1943).

=== World War II ===
Mahin served as a lieutenant in the U.S. Army Air Forces with Clark Gable. While serving during World War II, Mahin wrote Combat America (1943), narrated by Gable.

=== Post-war ===
After the war, Mahin did uncredited work on Adventure (1945) for Gable and Fleming, which the writer called "Pretty bad. Very mystical thing. Made a lot of money because it was his first picture since the war." He also worked on The Yearling (1946) and The Beginning or the End (1947). He wrote The Risen Soldier, a biopic of Cardinal Spellman to star Van Johnson that was not used.

=== 20th Century Fox ===
Over at 20th Century Fox he did That Wonderful Urge (1948), Down to the Sea in Ships (1949), Love That Brute (1950) and Panic in the Streets (1950).

=== Louis B Mayer ===
When Louis B. Mayer left MGM, Mahin went with him. Mayer put Mahin under personal contract, and would loan him out to studios, including MGM. Mahin called Mayer "the best agent I ever had. Whatever pictures I did after he left, he guaranteed me so much, and he’d lend me out at a big profit. He’d take 20 percent, and he’d still make more than I’d make. People would send me things, I'd knock wood, and they’d send me more things."

Mahin wrote the screenplay for Show Boat (1951), the Technicolor remake of the noted 1927 stage musical, which had previously been filmed in 1936. According to musical theatre historian Miles Kreuger in his book, Show Boat: The History of a Classic American Musical, Mahin retained most of the basic structure of the storyline, but little of Oscar Hammerstein II's stage dialogue, preferring to create his own. According to Kreuger, Mahin and producer Arthur Freed introduced the plot device of keeping the lovers Magnolia Hawks and Gaylord Ravenal young to the end, rather than having a passage that showed them forty years older, as in the original stage musical.

He wrote Quo Vadis (1951) for MGM and My Son John (1952) for Leo McCarey. He redid his Red Dust script as Mogambo (1953) for Gable and John Ford, and worked on another melodrama in the tropics, Elephant Walk (1954).

In 1955 a play he wrote with Patsy Ruth Miller, Don Ella, played at UCLA.

Mahin wrote Lucy Gallant (1955), The Bad Seed (1956) for LeRoy, Heaven Knows, Mr. Allison (1957) for John Huston, and No Time for Sergeants (1958) for LeRoy. Heaven Knows, Mr Allison earned him another Oscar nomination.

Mahin adapted Paint Your Wagon for Mayer but plans to film it were dropped when Mayer died. (It would be filmed in 1969 with a fresh script.) Mahin did do some uncredited work on the Cinerama film, South Seas Adventure (1958).

=== Producer ===
Mahin got to know Martin Rackin when they worked on a script of Pearl Buck's Letter from Peking, that was never filmed. They decided to form a production company. Together they wrote and produced The Horse Soldiers (1959), Revak the Rebel (1959) and North to Alaska (1960). The association ended when Rackin was appointed head of Paramount.

=== Later career ===
Mahin's later credits included The Spiral Road (1962) and Moment to Moment (1966) for LeRoy. He also wrote episodes of The Jimmy Stewart Show (1971–72).

== Politics ==
Mahin was a founder of the Screen Writers Guild in 1933. In the late 1930s, he became president of a rival organization, the Screen Playwrights Guild. He rejoined the Guild in 1948 and became its president.

== Accolades ==
He won the Laurel Award for Screenwriting Achievement in 1958.

== Personal life ==
His second marriage was to silent film actress Patsy Ruth Miller from 1937 until their divorce in 1946. They had one child, Timothy Miller Mahin.

== Selected credits ==
=== Writer ===
- The Unholy Garden (1931) – uncredited
- The Beast of the City (1932; dialogue continuity, as John L. Mahin)
- The Wet Parade (1932; adaptation, as John L. Mahin)
- Scarface (1932; dialogue continuity)
- Tiger Shark (1932) – uncredited
- Red Dust (1932; screenplay, as John Mahin)
- Rasputin and the Empress (1932) – uncredited
- Hell Below (1933; dialogue)
- Bombshell (1933; screenplay)
- The Prizefighter and the Lady (1933)
- Eskimo aka Mala the Magnificent (1933)
- Laughing Boy (1934)
- Treasure Island (1934; screenplay)
- Chained (1934)
- Naughty Marietta (1935)
- China Seas (1935) – uncredited
- Riffraff (1936) – uncredited
- Wife vs. Secretary (1936; screenplay)
- Small Town Girl (1936)
- The Devil is a Sissy (1936)
- Love on the Run (1936)
- Captains Courageous (1937)
- A Star Is Born (1937)
- The Last Gangster (1937)
- Test Pilot (1938) – uncredited
- Too Hot to Handle (1938; screenplay)
- The Wizard of Oz (1939) – uncredited
- Boom Town (1940)
- Dr. Jekyll and Mr. Hyde (1941)
- Johnny Eager (1942; screenplay)
- Woman of the Year (1942) – uncredited
- Tortilla Flat (1942; screenplay)
- The Adventures of Tartu (1943)
- Combat America (1943) (documentary)
- Adventure (1945) – uncredited
- The Yearling (1946) – uncredited
- That Wonderful Urge (1948) – uncredited
- Down to the Sea in Ships (1949)
- Love That Brute (1950)
- Panic in the Streets (1950) – uncredited
- Show Boat (1951)
- Quo Vadis (1951)
- My Sơn John (1952; adaptation)
- Mogambo (1953)
- Elephant Walk (1954)
- Lucy Gallant (1955)
- The Bad Seed (1956; screenplay)
- Heaven Knows, Mr. Allison (1957)
- No Time for Sergeants (1958)
- The Horse Soldiers (1959) – also uncredited producer
- The Barbarians (1960) – also producer
- North to Alaska (1960; screenplay) – also uncredited producer
- The Spiral Road (1962)
- Moment to Moment (1966)
- The Jimmy Stewart Show (1971–1972) (TV series) (episodes "Identity Crisis" and "Old School Ties")

=== Actor ===
- Scarface (1932) – MacArthur from the Journal (uncredited)
- Hell Below (1933) – Lieut. (JG) 'Speed' Nelson (final film role)

== Notes ==
- McCarthy, Todd; McBride, Joseph (1986). "John Lee Mahin: Team Player". In Patrick McGilligan (ed.). Backstory: Interviews with Screenwriters of Hollywood's Golden Age. University of California Press. pp. 241–290. ISBN 9780520056893.
