= Combat America =

1945 documentary film

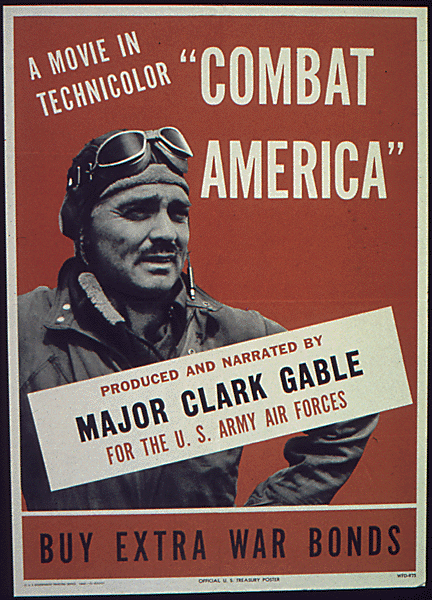
- Theatrical poster
- Written by: John Lee Mahin
- Produced by: First Motion Picture Unit, U.S. Army Air Forces
- Starring: Clark Gable
- Narrated by: Clark Gable
- Cinematography: Robert Boles; Andrew J. McIntyre; Merlin Toti
- Music by: Herbert Stothart
- Distributed by: Office of War Information, Bureau of Motion Pictures
- Release date: January 1945
- Running time: 62 minutes
- Country: United States
- Language: English

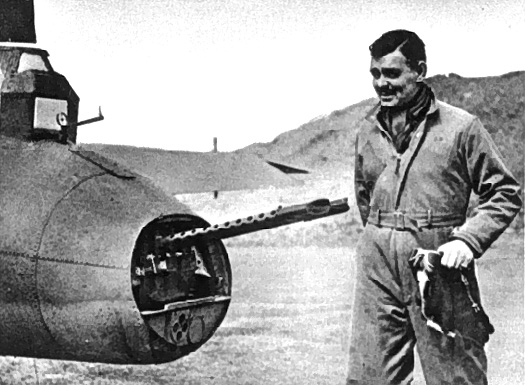
Clark Gable next to a B-17, 1943

Full movie

Combat America is a 1945 documentary film produced during World War II, narrated by Clark Gable. At the time of the film's production in 1943, Gable was a major in the Eighth Air Force, a unit of the U.S. Army Air Forces. While he was stationed in England, Gable flew five combat missions from May 4–September 23, 1943, and during one of them, his boot was struck by an anti-aircraft shell, and he was nearly hit by other flak bursts. Gable's film crew included MGM cameraman Andrew J. McIntyre; First Lieutenant Howard Voss, a sound engineer; Master Sergeant Robert Boles, a cameraman; Master Sergeant Marlin Toti, another cameraman; and First Lieutenant John Mahlin, a scriptwriter." (Note: Gable also appeared in the film, interacting with aerial gunners, other aircrew and in conversation with General Ira C. Eaker, Commander of the 8th Air Force.)

Combat America was originally intended to be used as a recruiting film for aerial gunners; however, by the time it began production, the needs for gunners had lessened. The film was completed as an account of aerial combat over occupied Europe and as a testament to the Eighth Air Force aircrew and ground crew in England.

== Synopsis ==
In 1943, in preparation for overseas deployment, 400 pilots and 3,600 crewmen of the 351st Bombardment Group assemble at a Colorado air base. Arriving in England, as part of the Eighth Air Force, the 351st BG is welcomed by the Royal Air Force and begins training, attending daily lectures on security. Their first mission flying Boeing B-17 Flying Fortress bombers has the armada departing at 15-second intervals.

The first mission of the 351st on Fortress Europe, after fighting through Luftwaffe defenders, is a success, with all 20 B-17s returning safely back to base. The danger of flying in massed formation, however, is brought home in training, when a collision takes place over the home base. Missions are also not always without casualties and 351st bombers are shot down. Wounded airmen who make it back to base, are cared for at a nearby hospital. When bombers are all shot up, the ground crew works up to 90-hour periods to put them back into service.

As the mission tallies build, the men partake in activities at the base, including games, socializing and worship. The U.S.O. brings entertainers such as Bob Hope while the Red Cross provides the men with rest and recreation. During special parades, commanders of the 8th Air Force bestow medals for exceptional service and sacrifice.

The 351st participates in a big mission into Germany and after flying for about three hours, the B-17s' fighter escort turns back. As the bombers near their target to drop incendiary and anti-personnel bombs, enemy fighter aircraft appear and intense flak comes up from the ground. After a long battle, the 351st returns to base, ready to fight again until the war is over.

== Cast ==
- Clark Gable as himself / Aerial gunner / Narrator
- General Henry H. "Hap" Arnold as himself / Commander, U.S. Army Air Forces (credited as H.H. Arnold)
- General Ira C. Eaker as himself / Commander of the 8th Air Force
- Prince Richard, Duke of Gloucester as himself
- Bob Hope as himself
- Frances Langford as herself
- Jack Pepper as himself
- Tony Romano as himself

- William A. Hatcher || Himself ||Commanding General
- Philip G. Hulse as himself / Top Turret Gunner
- Kenneth L. Huls as himself / Ball Turret Gunner
- Theodore R. Argiropulos (Randall) as himself / Pilot
- Robert Wallace as himself / co-pilot
- Daniel F. Stevens as himself / Bombardier
- Paul J. Postias Himself / Ball Turret Gunner
- Tim Tuchet as himself / Tailgunner
- "Ace" Akins as himself
- Pete Provenzale as himself

== Production ==
In 1942, following the death of Gable's wife, U.S. Army Air Forces General Henry H. "Hap" Arnold offered him a "special assignment" in aerial gunnery. (Note: Gable's assignment was detailed in a letter read out in the film: "1st Lieutenant Clark Gable is hereby directed to proceed to England ... for making a combat film dealing particularly with the combat phase of aerial gunnery.")

The special assignment was to make a recruiting film in combat with the Eighth Air Force. Gable had completed his training as an aerial gunner at the end of January 1943. After Combat America, intended to recruit aerial gunners, Gable went on to work on Wings Up (1943), recreating much of the training he had gone through as an officer.

In Combat America, initial footage depicts aircraft flying over American mountains, then 351st Bombardment Group operations at RAF Polebrook The film later shows a wall poster with target names and swastikas indicating confirmed kills by the bomber group. Combat footage begins three-quarters of the way into the film and includes the take off and return of bomber aircraft on missions. Footage at the end of the film includes a Boeing B-17 Flying Fortress in an uncontrolled dive with a portion of the horizontal stabilizer missing and a shoot-down of Luftwaffe fighter aircraft. Intercut with the combat footage is close-up footage of machine guns firing from B-17 waist gun positions.

A number of contemporary combat aircraft are featured in Combat America, including Boeing B-17F and B-17G Flying Fortress bombers, Republic P-47C Thunderbolt fighter aircraft, Handley Page Halifax bombers, Supermarine Spitfire Mk.Vb fighter aircraft, Beechcraft Model 18 transport and Lockheed Model 12A Electra Junior transport aircraft. German aircraft that are seen are Focke-Wulf Fw 190, Messerschmitt Bf 109 and Messerschmitt Bf 110 fighter aircraft. In aircraft recognition training, a Junkers Ju 88A bomber and Heinkel He 111H-1 bomber is shown.

== Reception ==
Combat America was typical of the training and recruitment films of the period produced under the auspices of the Office of War Information.

== See also ==
- RAF Polebrook § Hollywood at Polebrook
- Clark Gable filmography
