= F. Van Wyck Mason =

American historian and novelist

- Born: Francis Van Wyck Mason; November 11, 1901; Boston, Massachusetts, U.S.
- Died: August 28, 1978 (aged 76); Bermuda
- Education: Harvard College
- Occupation: Novelist
- Writing career
- Pen name: F. V. W. Mason, Geoffrey Coffin [with Helen Brawner (1902-) or A. H. Young O'Brien], Frank W. Mason, Ward Weaver
- Genres: Pulp magazine, historical fiction, detective fiction, spy fiction, young adult fiction

Cover of Multi Million Dollar Murders

Francis Van Wyck Mason (November 11, 1901 – August 28, 1978) was an American historian and novelist. He had a long and prolific career as a writer spanning 50 years and including 78 published novels, many of which were well-received best sellers.

== Biography ==
=== Early life and education ===
Van Wyck (pronounced Wike) Mason was born to a patrician Boston family which immigrated to North America during the 17th Century. His early life featured much adventure, even before he began writing. His first eight years he lived in Berlin and then Paris, where his grandfather served as U.S. Consul General, and during that time he learned the French language. Mason himself noted that he didn't learn English until he was nearly ten. After a few years in Illinois he left for Europe in 1917, while still a teenager, to fight in World War I. Like many future writers, he was an ambulance driver for a while. He then managed to enlist in the French Army, where he received decorations as an artillery officer, including the Legion of Honor. On Armistice Day, he was celebrating just his 17th birthday, yet had already joined the United States Army and achieved the rank of Lieutenant. After the war he went to preparatory school, then attended Harvard University, where he received his Bachelor of Science degree in 1924. At one time during his college years, he was mistakenly arrested for murder. Having borrowed a dinner jacket, he was identified wrongly as a waiter who had committed a murder.

His hopes of entering the diplomatic corps were thwarted after his father's death, so Mason started an import business instead and spent the next few years traveling the world buying antiques and rugs. His travels included Europe, Russia, the Near East, North Africa (nine weeks with his own caravan), the West Indies, Central Africa, and a ride across Central America on horseback. He lived in New York City, served in a cavalry unit of the National Guard, and played quite a bit of polo. He indulged an interest in hunting the rest of his life.

=== Writing career and personal life ===
Cover from Seeds of Murder, Mason's first book

By 1927 a chance meeting with one of his college professors, John Gallishaw, encouraged him to try writing. He attended Gallishaw's course in short fiction on the condition that he pay for the course out of future sales. He married socialite Dorothy L. MacReady in New York City during November of that year. By May 1928 he had his first story published. He enjoyed immediate success selling to the pulp magazines, and sold 18 stories before his first rejection. The magazines paid well at that time, and he was soon able to build a comfortable home outside of Baltimore, Maryland. In 1930, he published his first novel, The Seeds Of Murder, which introduced Captain Hugh North, an agent of U.S. Army Intelligence. North was the hero in a long series of "intrigue" novels.

By 1931, he had settled into a career as an author of novels as well as short fiction, publishing his first historical novel in book form, Captain Nemesis, which was republished from an earlier pulp serial. The historical novel apparently did not sell well, because he resumed the mystery/intrigue genre, publishing a dozen or so volumes during the next seven years, including nine more about Hugh North.

Mason was still writing historical stories for the pulps during this period and during 1938 resumed the genre for a major novel, Three Harbours, about the early phases of the American Revolution. By this time Mason was doing very well financially, with residences in Bermuda and Nantucket, as well as Maryland. When delivering the manuscript of Three Harbours from Nantucket, he was caught in the middle of the New England Hurricane of 1938. He made it to New York, and the book became very popular. It changed his emphasis to historical fiction for the rest of his career, though he continued to write Hugh North stories until 1968.

During the next few years, Mason wrote two companion books to Three Harbours – Stars on the Sea and Rivers Of Glory – as well as three more Hugh North mysteries. These books all sold well, especially Stars on the Sea, which was a top 10 bestseller for 1940, and Mason was very successful when the war interrupted his writing. He re-enlisted in the Army after Pearl Harbor and suspended his writing career, though he did manage to write some youth-oriented war stories using the name Frank W. Mason. At this time he also published a couple of reworked pulp serials using the name Ward Weaver. During World War II, he worked as Chief Historian on General Eisenhower's staff, having achieved the rank of Colonel, and received numerous awards for bravery. His main responsibility was to document the war for future generations, but he also wrote a famous communiqué which announced the activities of D-Day to the world. As part of his duties he followed behind or with advancing troops as they worked their way into enemy territory and was one of the first into some of the concentration camps, including Buchenwald.

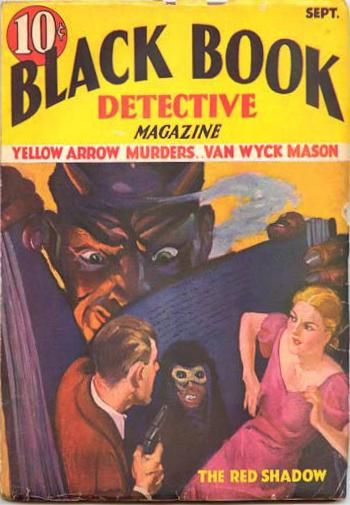
Mason's The Yellow Arrow Murders was the cover story for the September 1933 issue of Black Book Detective

After the war, Mason settled into a more leisurely lifestyle of a little more than one book per year, which he was to maintain for the next quarter century. His style was well refined by this time, and he published a series of fairly popular books. He finished his American Revolution series with Eagle in the Sky in 1948. The next year he wrote Cutlass Empire, a popular novel about the famous buccaneer Henry Morgan, and during 1951 started a trilogy about the US Civil War.

During the 1950s, Mason rewrote more of his pulps for the paperback market and in 1955 published a successful youth book titled The Winter At Valley Forge. After that, he continued to write historical novels for youths. Also during the 1950s, he relocated from Baltimore to Bermuda. His wife was ill during this period and finally died in 1958.

Mason soon married Jean-Louise Hand, his long-time secretary. He spent the rest of his life in Bermuda, writing historical fiction for adults and youths, as well as several more Hugh North novels.

=== Death ===
Mason drowned in 1978, while swimming off the coast of Bermuda after having finished Armored Giants, about the battle between the Monitor and Merrimack, which was published posthumously in 1980.

== Writing ==
=== Overview ===
As a writer Mason's career was based on popular fiction but included four main genres: Pulp fiction, Mystery/intrigue (mainly based on series character Hugh North), historical fiction, and young adult fiction.

=== Writing style ===
Mason's writing style was colorful though straightforward. His stories usually involve a heroic gentleman character. This hero may be forced to extreme measures by circumstances, but in the end, is victorious. Based on his own life which involved extensive travel, his stories are usually either set in exotic locations, as in the Hugh North stories, or involve main characters who are traveling extensively.

=== Pulp fiction ===
Mason's early work of adventure stories started with "The Fetish Of Sergeant M’Gourra" in May 1928 and continued until he started his more serious historical fiction during 1938. He published stories involving war, jungle settings, the French Foreign Legion, and historical adventures. Several of these early historical stories were rewritten and published as paperback originals during the 1950s. Mason's novel The Barbarians (1954) is the story of Cealwyn, an Ancient Briton. Cealwyn is kidnapped by Carthaginians, but escapes and fights his former captors during the First Punic War. The story was made into the movie Revak the Rebel. Another of Mason's pulp fiction stories made into a movie was The Enemy's Goal which was used as the basis for The Spy Ring starring Jane Wyman. That story combined Mason's interest in polo with a good dose of military intrigue to add drama.

=== Hugh North Series ===
Captain (later Major and Colonel) Hugh North was a prototype for James Bond: tough, athletic, a good shot and hand-to-hand fighter, as well as perfect in dress, manner, and speech for elegant society. The North series also sometimes foreshadowed actual military events, including a sneak attack on Pearl Harbor. Mason created the character in 1930 and the series began with stories that had a fairly traditional mystery format. Through the years leading up to WW II these stories contain increasing levels of political intrigue but retained a murder mystery as a central theme. After the war the series largely became more typical spy fiction with the emphasis on a secret mission.

=== Historical fiction ===
Mason's historical stories nearly always involve some kind of warfare and frequently include naval battles or long sea voyages. Most of his historical novels are prefaced by a fairly lengthy (usually several pages) discussion of the historical setting and context of his story. Often, with his fictional characters, Mason recounts the story of some significant but not widely known historical event. Actual historical people are occasionally introduced as minor characters of the plot. An interesting tidbit about Mason's work in this genre is that most of the titles have 13 letters. When writing Rivers of Glory his secretary pointed out that the titles of the first two books in that series met that criterion, so Mason decided to go with it.

== See also ==
- List of ambulance drivers during World War I
