= Revak the Rebel =

- Directed by: Rudolph Maté
- Screenplay by: John Lee Mahin; Martin Rackin; K.P. Rohnstein
- Based on: The Barbarians; 1934 novel by Francis Van Wyck Mason
- Produced by: John Lee Mahin; Martin Rackin
- Starring: Jack Palance; Milly Vitale
- Cinematography: Carl E. Guthrie
- Edited by: Gene Ruggiero
- Music by: Franco Ferrara
- Production company: Galatea Film
- Distributed by: Galatea Film
- Release date: October 4, 1960
- Country: Italy
- Languages: Italian; English

Revak the Rebel (a.k.a. The Barbarians, a.k.a. Rivak the Barbarian) is a 1960 film set in Iberia in the days leading up to the outbreak of the Second Punic War. Jack Palance plays an Iberian prince whose nation and family are so abused by the Carthaginians that he turns to the Romans for help in achieving his revenge.

This film was adapted for the screen by John Lee Mahin and Martin Rackin from The Barbarians, a novel written by F. Van Wyck Mason (although making significant changes to the plot like renaming the hero from Cealwyn to Revak and turning him from a Cassiterides Celtic prince to an Iberian prince from fictional Penda island, named after Cealwyn's father in the novel). The film also only followed the first half of the book and was directed by Rudolph Maté.

The film was a pilot for a projected ninety-minute TV series to be called The Barbarians (as it would cover the whole length of the book) which was never picked and got theatrical release out of the US. The film was first released as Rivak the Barbarian or The Barbarians. Revak the Rebel was filmed on location in Italy and it cost NBC $750,000, making it the most expensive pilot ever produced (at the time). The film has been released on DVD as Revak the Rebel by Sinister Cinema, a company specializing on B movies, Z movies, peplums and similar productions.

== Plot ==
Revak is an Iberian prince from Penda, a small island by the Iberian Peninsula, at the time of the Second Punic War. The Carthaginian fleet pillages his homeland and enslaves the surviving native men, including him.

After an eventful passage aboard a galley he arrives in Carthage and becomes an elephant driver. He is courted by local noblewomen and a virtuous Roman captive named Valeria, but puts love aside in his obsession with revenge against Carthage.

As the best means of obtaining this revenge Revak pledges himself to Rome, which wants hegemony in the Mediterranean Sea and shares his desire to see Carthage destroyed.

== Cast ==
- Jack Palance as "Revak"
- Milly Vitale as "Cherata"
- Deirdre Sullivan as "Valeria"
- Austin Willis as Varro
- Guy Rolfe as Kainus
- Richard Wyler as Lycursus

== See also ==
- List of American films of 1960
- list of historical drama films
