= Love on the Run (1936 film) =

1936 film by W. S. Van Dyke

- Original theatrical poster
- Directed by: W.S. Van Dyke
- Screenplay by: John Lee Mahin; Manuel Seff; Gladys Hurlbut
- Based on: Beauty and the Beat; 1936 story in Hearst's International Cosmopolitan by Alan Green; Julian Brodie
- Produced by: Joseph L. Mankiewicz
- Starring: Joan Crawford; Clark Gable; Franchot Tone; Reginald Owen
- Cinematography: Oliver T. Marsh
- Edited by: Frank Sullivan
- Music by: Franz Waxman
- Production company: Metro-Goldwyn-Mayer
- Distributed by: Loew's Inc.
- Release date: November 20, 1936
- Running time: 80 minutes
- Country: United States
- Language: English
- Budget: $578,000
- Box office: $1.8 million

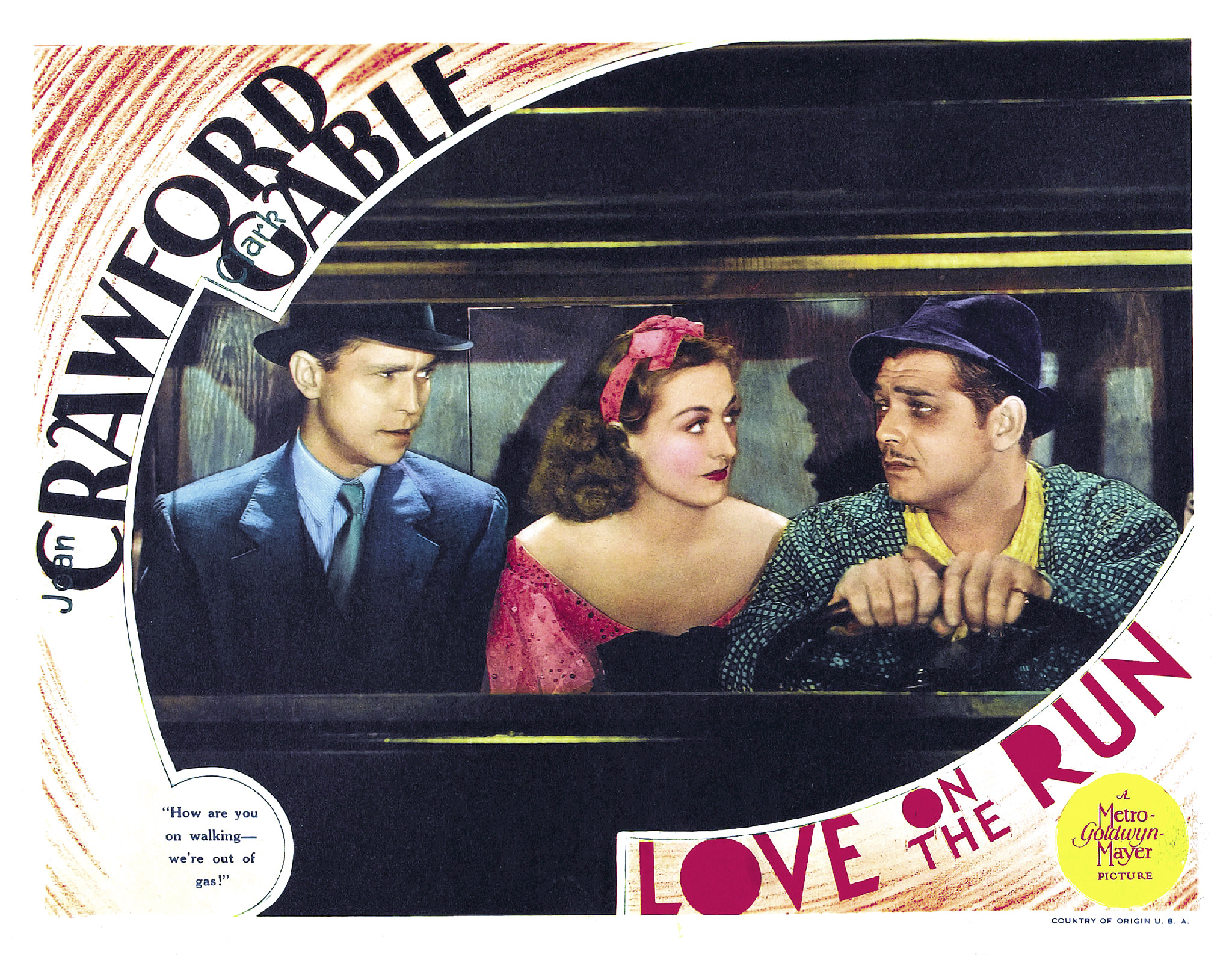
Lobby card

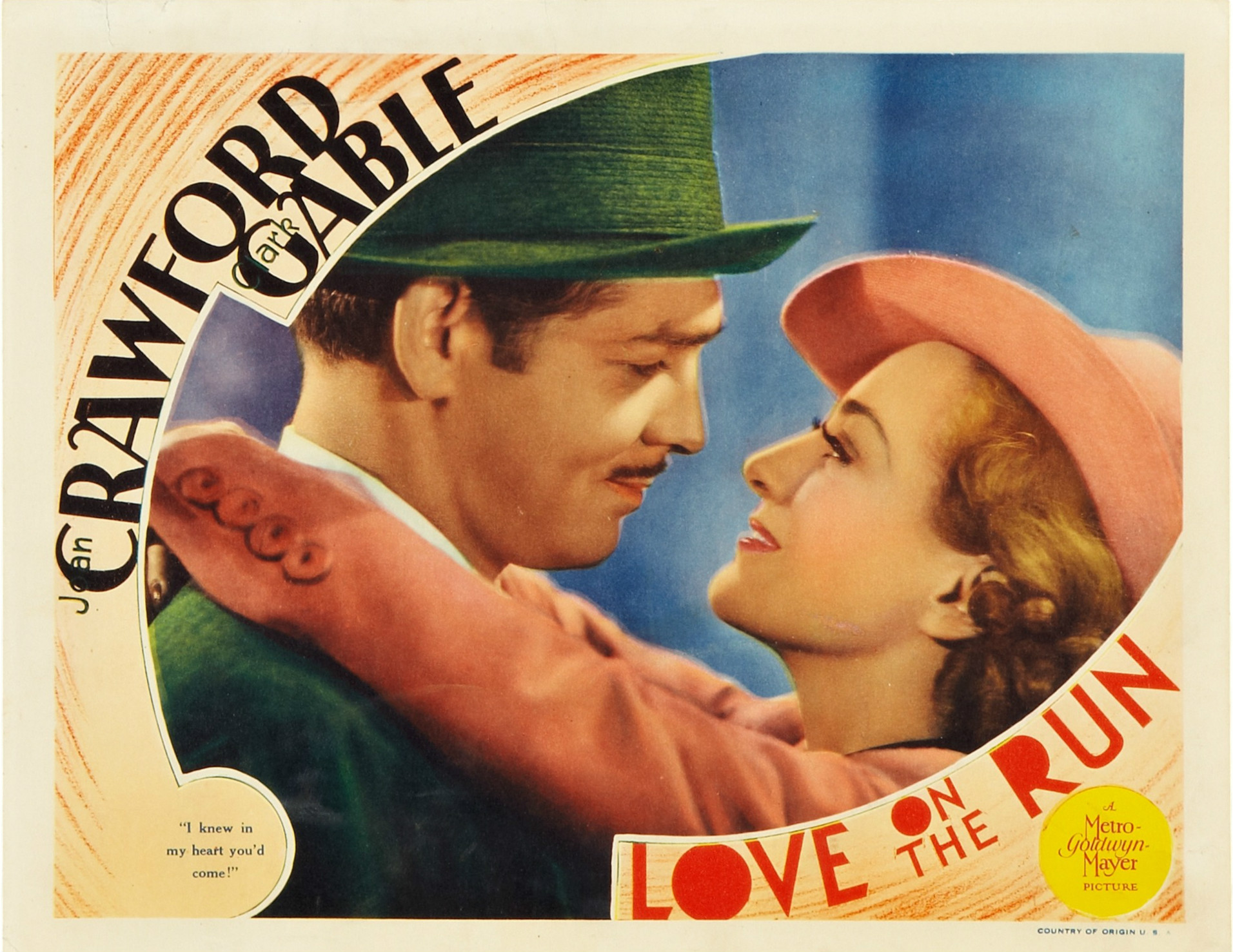
Lobby card

Love on the Run is a 1936 American romantic comedy film, directed by W.S. Van Dyke, produced by Joseph L. Mankiewicz, and starring Joan Crawford, Clark Gable, Franchot Tone and Reginald Owen in a story about rival newspaper correspondents assigned to cover the marriage of a socialite. The screenplay by John Lee Mahin, Manuel Seff and Gladys Hurlbut was based on a story by Alan Green and Julian Brodie. Love on the Run is the seventh of eight cinematic collaborations between Crawford and Gable. At the time of its release, Love on the Run was called "a lot of happy nonsense" by critics, but was a huge financial success, nonetheless.

== Plot ==
Rival London-based American newspaper correspondents Michael "Mike" Anthony and Barnabas "Barney" Pells flip a coin to determine who will cover which of two boring assignments. Mike gets to cover the wedding of millionairess Sally Parker to fortune-seeking Prince Igor, while Barney has to interview aviator Baron Otto Spandermann and his wife, Baroness Hilda.

When Mike sees Sally running out of the church, he follows her, hoping to get a story. At her hotel, Mike runs into the suspicious Barney, but does not tell him what just happened. He then sneaks into Sally's hotel room, tells her that he has admired her for years, and suggests that he help her "get away from it all." When the gigolo prince comes to the hotel, Mike slugs him when the prince recognizes him as a reporter. He and Sally run away, using the Baron and Baroness's flying suits as disguises. Barney chases them to the airport, but is too late. They fly away, though neither is a pilot. Just before they crash land in France, they find a munitions map in a bouquet of flowers intended for the Baroness and realize that the aviators are spies.

Although Mike has sent a secret cablegram about Sally to his editor, Lees Berger, in New York, he is even more excited about the spy story. In Paris, Mike and Sally are found by Barney, then are spotted by the Baron and Baroness. Barney comes along when they flee, but Mike pushes him into the back of the truck they steal and convinces Sally that Barney is a lowlife reporter. By nightfall, they arrive at the Palace of Fontainebleau and sneak in to spend the night. During the evening, they realize that they are in love, and Mike tries to tell her that he is a reporter, but cannot. Next morning, Barney finds them again, but Sally does not believe him when he accuses Mike of being a reporter too. Soon, however, an ashamed Mike gives her a newspaper with his byline. He apologizes and tells her he loves her, but she sends him away. When Barney arrives, she says she will give him the greatest story of his career, and they go off to make headlines.

A short time later, while they are traveling by train to Nice, Sally realizes that she still loves Mike and wants to go to him, but just then the Baron and Baroness come into their compartment with guns and demand that Sally give them the map. When they do not find it, after pushing Barney off the train, they leave. Barney catches up with Mike at a café in Paris and tells him what happened, Mike decides to save Sally. In Nice, Mike is reunited with Sally, and they go to the train station. In the station, the Baroness switches clothes with Sally in the ladies room, then goes with Mike, posing as Sally. The Baron finds Sally and takes her to a restaurant. She tries to alert the police, but when two policemen arrive, they believe the Baron's story that she stole his aircraft.

The Baron then kidnaps Sally and the policemen and takes them to his chateau, where the Baroness has Mike bound and gagged. Having followed Mike and the Baroness (thinking that she was Sally), Barney at first laughs at Mike, then frees him. Using various ruses, Mike, Sally and the policemen eventually overwhelm the spies. Sally and Mike go off, leaving Barney tied up, but Mike has a change of heart and returns, once again finding Barney trying to get his story first by using the chateau phone to cable his editor. They finally agree to file a joint byline. Sally and Mike agree that they will soon be married.

== Cast ==
- Joan Crawford as Sally Parker
- Clark Gable as Michael "Mike" Anthony
- Franchot Tone as Barnabus W. "Barney" Pells
- Reginald Owen as Baron Otto Spandermann
- Mona Barrie as Baroness Hilda Spandermann
- Ivan Lebedeff as Prince Igor
- Charles Judels as Lieutenant of Police
- William Demarest as Editor Lees Berger
- Donald Meek as Fontainbleau Palace Caretaker
- Charles Trowbridge as Paris bureau chief (uncredited)
- Billy Gilbert as Maitre d' (uncredited)
- Frank Puglia as Waiter (uncredited)
- Harry Allen as Chauffeur (uncredited)

== Production ==
Love on the Run aerial coordinator Paul Mantz had Amelia Earhart's aircraft re-painted in a fictional scheme and used for the ground sequences, while studio cockpit mock-ups and scale models were employed for other scenes. This was exactly the same plane that Earhart was piloting when she disappeared on her final expedition the following year.

Looking to capitalize on the American screwball comedy genre, MGM paired its two top box office stars, Gable and Crawford. Principal photography took place from August 19 to September 15, 1936.

A Lockheed Model 10E Electra figures prominently as the aircraft stolen from the airport. The aircraft was provided by Hollywood "stunt" pilot Paul Mantz who acted as the aerial coordinator for the brief aerial sequence. It was precisely the same plane later flown by Mantz's friend Amelia Earhart on her ill-fated around-the-world expedition in 1937. (Note: The Lockheed Electra ("R16020") was owned bymAmelia Earhart and was being readied for her ill-fated breaking circumnavigational flight of the globe in 1937.)

== Reception ==
In his review of Love on the Run, Howard Barnes of the New York Herald Tribune wrote, "A lot of gay nonsense has been strung together ... a fantastic and insubstantial narrative, with the result that it is almost continuously amusing and frequently hilarious ... Miss Crawford, of the big eyes and flowing hair, turns in a surprisingly volatile and amusing performance as the heiress." John T. McManus in his review for The New York Times, however, called it, "A slightly daffy cinematic item of absolutely no importance." Variety wrote that it was "crowded with ludicrous situations" and suffered from "meandering story development, some slipshod dialogue concoctions and several vapid moments." John Mosher of The New Yorker wrote, "Everybody works very hard in Love on the Run, but only succeeds in seeming pretty pitiful."

In a later review by film critic and historian Leonard Maltin, he dismissed the film as derivative; "This stale 'It Happened One Night' variation relies solely on its star power."

=== Box office ===
According to MGM records Love on the Run earned $1,141,000 in the United States and Canada and $721,000 elsewhere resulting in a profit of $1,284,000.

== See also ==
- Clark Gable filmography
