= Laughing Sinners =

1931 film

- Original film poster
- Directed by: Harry Beaumont
- Written by: Continuity: Bess Meredyth; Dialogue: Martin Flavin; Edith Fitzgerald
- Based on: Torch Song; 1930 play by Kenyon Nicholson
- Starring: Joan Crawford; Neil Hamilton; Clark Gable
- Cinematography: Charles Rosher
- Edited by: George Hively
- Music by: Charles H. Gabriel; Martin Broones; Ina D. Ogden
- Distributed by: Metro-Goldwyn-Mayer
- Release date: May 30, 1931
- Running time: 72 minutes
- Country: United States
- Language: English
- Budget: $338,000
- Box office: $765,000

Laughing Sinners is a 1931 American pre-Code Metro-Goldwyn-Mayer feature film starring Joan Crawford and Clark Gable in a story about a cafe entertainer who experiences spiritual redemption. The dialogue by Martin Flavin was based upon the play Torch Song by Kenyon Nicholson. The film was directed by Harry Beaumont. Laughing Sinners was the second of eight cinematic collaborations between Crawford and Gable.

== Plot ==
Ivy Stevens, a singer and dancer, is callously abandoned by her lover Howard. She tries to commit suicide, but Carl, a Salvation Army member, stops her and introduces her to the charitable ways of his group. She reluctantly joins, when Howard comes walking by her in the street by chance. Somewhat later, he seduces her and tries to bring her back to their old way of life. However, Carl drops by, and—after punching Howard in the face --, disavows that any affection of his towards her is influencing him to bring her back to the Army; he convinces her to return. Ivy abandons Howard. In the last scene Ivy and Carl, in Salvation Army uniform, walk off and share a hug.

== Cast ==
- Joan Crawford as Ivy Stevens
- Neil Hamilton as Howard Palmer
- Clark Gable as Carl Loomis
- Marjorie Rambeau as Ruby
- Guy Kibbee as Cass Wheeler
- Cliff Edwards as Mike
- Roscoe Karns as Fred Geer
- Gertrude Short as Edna
- George Cooper as Joe
- George F. Marion as Humpty
- Bert Woodruff as Tink

== Production ==
=== Casting ===
John Mack Brown was originally playing Gable's role when the studio decided to scrap his footage and reshoot the part with Gable taking Brown's place. At that point, Brown's career in mainstream feature films ended and he transitioned to B westerns, reverting his name to "Johnny Mack Brown."

Crawford and Rambeau, who both play chorus girls in Laughing Sinners, would go on to play mother (Rambeau) and daughter (Crawford) in the film Torch Song in 1953, which is the name of the play on which Laughing Sinners is based and the last song Ivy sings to Howard when he ditches her.

== Reception ==
=== Critical reception ===
Andre Sennwald commented in The New York Times, "Miss Crawford...has tempered the intense and not a little self-conscious quality of her acting without hurting her vibrant and breath-catching spirit."

=== Box office ===
According to MGM records the film earned $624,000 in the US and Canada and $141,000 elsewhere, resulting in a profit of $156,000.

== See also ==
- Clark Gable filmography
