= Wife vs. Secretary =

1936 film by Clarence Brown

- Theatrical release poster
- Directed by: Clarence Brown
- Screenplay by: Norman Krasna; John Lee Mahin; Alice Duer Miller
- Based on: "Wife Versus Secretary"; 1935 story in Cosmopolitan by Faith Baldwin
- Produced by: Clarence Brown; Hunt Stromberg
- Starring: Clark Gable; Jean Harlow; Myrna Loy; May Robson; George Barbier; James Stewart; Hobart Cavanaugh
- Cinematography: Ray June
- Edited by: Frank E. Hull
- Music by: Herbert Stothart; Edward Ward
- Production company: Metro-Goldwyn-Mayer
- Distributed by: Loew's Inc.
- Release date: February 28, 1936
- Running time: 88 minutes
- Country: United States
- Language: English
- Budget: $519,000
- Box office: $2 million

Wife vs. Secretary (or Wife Versus Secretary) is a 1936 American romantic comedy-drama film starring Clark Gable, Myrna Loy, and Jean Harlow. Directed and co-produced by Clarence Brown, it was the fifth of six collaborations between Gable and Harlow and the fourth of seven between Gable and Loy. The screenplay was based on the short story of the same title by Faith Baldwin, published in Cosmopolitan magazine in May 1935. The screenplay was written by Norman Krasna, John Lee Mahin and Alice Duer Miller.

May Robson, George Barbier, Hobart Cavanaugh, and James Stewart appear in support, with Stewart playing the secretary's suitor in one of his first memorable roles.

== Plot ==
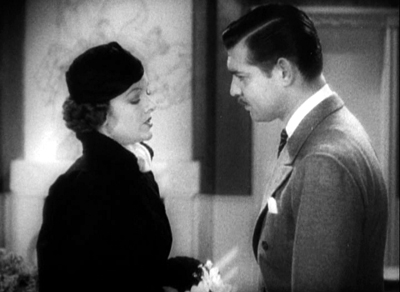
Myrna Loy and Clark Gable

High-end magazine publisher Van Stanhope and his wife, Linda, are celebrating their third wedding anniversary. They are very much in love, and demonstrate it in every way. However, Van's secretary, the beautiful and bright Helen "Whitey" Wilson, is thought by Van's mother to be too great a temptation to him. Linda refuses to listen to her, or her own friends, as she trusts her husband implicitly, the hallmark of her relationship with him and envy of all others.

Meanwhile, Whitey's beau, Dave, is frustrated with her when Van calls one night during dinner and she once again drops everything to rush off and serve him, any time, any place. When Dave asks her to marry him, she refuses, and buries herself deeper in her work.

Van covets J. D. Underwood's popular weekly to broaden his reader base. To prevent his chief rival from beating him to it, the pursuit is kept top secret - only Whitey is permitted to know.

When Van returns from meeting Underwood and tells Linda the white lie that he has spent the day at his club, Linda accidentally learns that he had not been there but had spent part of it with Whitey (who had merely helped him prepare his sales pitch). At a company skating party, Linda is too sick to skate, but Van and Whitey gleefully crack the whip together. Linda meanwhile gets a misinformed earful from a gabby wife who - clueless who Linda is - plants more seeds of fear and jealousy. On the ride home Van reveals he had turned down a request to promote Whitey elsewhere in the company, explaining she is too valuable to him. Linda pleads with him to assent; he refuses, they quarrel, she strides angry and hurt into their home, and he stomps off the same way for the refuge of his club.

She gives in and calls Van there. Overjoyed, he rushes home into her arms.

Van promises Linda a trip together to the Caribbean, but to preserve the secrecy of his still-pending blockbuster he is vague about a date. His top company rep falls ill, and Van is forced to take his place at a big industry convention in Havana. He knows it will be all work and no play, so refuses Linda's repeated requests to accompany him in lieu of the promised island getaway.

A day into the confab Whitey learns that Van's top rival is also scheming a deal with Underwood, who's playing both ends against the middle. She tells Van, and he has her catch the next flight to Havana to help him prepare an immediate contract proposal to head off the gambit.

The two plunge headlong into a work marathon. Caught up in the cloak-and-dagger, Van neglects to make promised calls to an increasingly broken-hearted wife, and Whitey falls evermore in unrequited love with him.

Van cinches the deal, and gets staggering drunk celebrating with Whitey. He develops a woozy attraction to her, which she weakens towards. Before things can go too far, Linda telephones. It is 2 AM when Whitey answers Van's phone; Linda assumes the worst and hangs up. The chastened twosome retire separately.

Pushed past her limit, Linda files for divorce, and refuses all Van's explanations and entreaties. His desperation yields to loneliness, and he invites Whitey to join him on a trip to Bermuda to clear his head. She agrees, but revealing her essential decency rushes to confront Linda before Linda's Europe-bound liner can depart. She makes it clear that to that point everything had indeed been business between her and Van, but that was going to change. Linda refuses to believe her account. Whitey says she's a fool not to, and hopes she does not, as she will get Van and Linda will never win him back.

Shortly later it's all business again between Van and Whitey back at Van's office. Linda appears, recognizing that she had let others undermine a perfect marriage. Van is overjoyed. Whitey quietly leaves, finds Dave waiting for her in his car, and they make up and move closer to each other.

== Cast ==
- Clark Gable as Van 'V.S.'/'Jake' Stanhope
- Jean Harlow as Helen 'Whitey' Wilson
- Myrna Loy as Linda Stanhope
- May Robson as Mimi Stanhope
- George Barbier as J.D. Underwood
- James Stewart as Dave
- Hobart Cavanaugh as Joe
- John Qualen as Mr. Jenkins
- Tom Dugan as Finney
- Gilbert Emery as Simpson
- Marjorie Gateson as Eve Merritt
- Gloria Holden as Joan Carstairs
- Eugene Borden as Ship's Officer (uncredited)
- Aileen Pringle as Mrs. Anne Barker (uncredited)

== Production ==
Wife vs. Secretary was the fifth collaboration of Gable and Harlow and the fourth of Gable and Loy. The picture was the first time that Harlow and Loy worked together; they would both appear as well in Libeled Lady later in 1936, with Harlow billed above William Powell and Spencer Tracy.

On Harlow during the making of Wife vs. Secretary, Loy said, "Jean was beautiful, but far from the raucous sexpot of her films. As a matter of fact, she began to shake that image in Wife vs. Secretary....She'd begged for a role that didn't require spouting slang and modeling lingerie. She even convinced them to darken her hair a shade, in hopes of toning down that brash image. It worked. She's really wonderful in the picture and her popularity wasn't diminished one bit. Actually we did kind of a reversal in that picture. Jean, supposedly the other woman, stayed very proper, while I had one foot in bed throughout. That's the sexiest wife I've ever played. In one scene, Clark stands outside my bedroom door and we banter, nothing more, but there's just no question about what they've done the night before. Clarence Brown, our director, made it all so subtle, yet, oh, so wonderfully suggestive. (In fact, the only vulgarity in the picture is in the breakfast scene, where I discover a diamond bracelet that Clark has hidden in the brook trout I'm about to eat. It didn't seem chic or funny to me—merely messy, typical of Hollywood's misguided notion of upper-class sophistication. I tried to get them to take it out, but they wouldn't. Needless to say, it's the scene everyone remembers, so what do I know?). Where sex is concerned, the double entendre, the ambiguity, it seems to me, is much more effective than being too explicit. This is something the moviemakers don't seem to understand today."

James Stewart, meanwhile, spoke of his scene in the car with Harlow, saying, "Clarence Brown, the director, wasn't too pleased by the way I did the smooching. He made us repeat the scene about half a dozen times...I botched it up on purpose. That Jean Harlow sure was a good kisser. I realized that until then I had never been really kissed." Despite being billed sixth in the cast, Stewart enjoys the most screen time aside from the three leads, mainly romantic sequences with Harlow, including the final scene and dialogue in the movie.

== Reception ==
=== Box office ===
The picture was a success with the filmgoing public, with MGM records indicating it earned $1,350,000 in the US and Canada and $717,000 elsewhere, turning a profit of $876,000.

=== Critical response ===
Variety commended the film, writing that "The script has been excellently handled, with the dialog held to a naturalness seldom achieved on the screen." The New York Times similarly praised the production, reporting that "any Faith Baldwin "Wife vs. Secretary" picture, with Gable, Harlow and Loy is predestined for success." Despite celebrating its rich production and competent directing, The Times did, however, criticise Gable's incapacity to act "coy."

In his book, The Jean Harlow Films (2019), James L. Neibaur writes that Gable and Harlow deliver solid performances and on-screen chemistry in what would be their fifth film collaboration, all while staying "within the parameters of the production code." Neibaur observes that upon release the film was well received, despite "some misgivings at the studio as to how audiences would react to the film" in light of Gable's divorce and Harlow's "shaky personal life." This did not appear to interfere with the response from contemporary critics, who instead pointed to Harlow's continued improvement as an actress with each successive performance.
