= Wings Up =

- Media cover
- Starring: Clark Gable; Gilbert Roland; Robert Preston; William Holden; General Henry H. "Hap" Arnold; Brenda Marshall
- Narrated by: Capt. Clark Gable (as credited)
- Production company: First Motion Picture Unit, Army Air Forces
- Distributed by: Office of War Information, Bureau of Motion Pictures
- Release date: 27 May 1943
- Running time: 20 minutes
- Country: United States
- Language: English

Wings Up (also known as Sustineo Alas in its release for the United States Army) is a short propaganda film produced during World War II, highlighting the role of the United States Army Air Forces Officer Candidate School. The film emphasized that while usually these courses would take up to a year in college, the country was at war now and needed all the qualified officers it could get and fast. The curriculum is briefly outlined in Wings Up as well as the kind of life a student would lead at this training center.

Wings Up film

== Plot ==
In 1943, a bombing mission by a Boeing B-17 Flying Fortress that had successfully dropped its bombs on target, has degenerated into an emergency situation over the Pacific. The navigator on board has not been able to plot a course back to the bomber's home base. The lives of the crew and the loss of the bomber depends on the skill and training provided for the navigator who represents a "weak link" in the crew.

The one solution to a lack of readiness to go to war in the air is the selection, testing, training and preparation offered by the Army Air Forces Officer Candidate School found in Miami, Florida. The motto of the school is Sustineo Alas (translated as "I sustain the wings"). The selection and testing to qualify is rigorous; after a physical examination, test scores based on general knowledge, and a stint as a corporal in command of soldiers, only 23 out of 1,000 candidates are chosen to proceed to the Officer's Candidate School.

All of the candidates have a diverse background and experiences, some as entertainers such as Robert Preston, while others have been successful in sports, business, science and academia. Many have also had combat experience as well as leadership positions. The twelve-week course stresses discipline, efficiency and restrictions that combine to instil all the attitudes and ethos of the officer cadre.

== Cast ==
- Clark Gable
- Robert Preston
- General Henry H. "Hap" Arnold
- Gilbert Roland (uncredited)
- William Holden (uncredited)
- Brenda Marshall (uncredited)

== Production ==
Narrated by Captain Clark Gable, Wings Up informed the youth of America about the Officer Candidate School, which was the primary setting for the production. (Note: Gable appears on screen at the end of the film.) In 1942, following the death of his wife, Carole Lombard, Gable joined the U.S. Army Air Forces after the Commanding General of the U.S. Army Air Forces Henry H. "Hap" Arnold offered Gable a "special assignment" in aerial gunnery.

Gable entered USAAF OCS Class 42-E on 17 August 1942, completing training on 28 October 1942. Commissioned as second lieutenants, Gable's special assignment was to make a recruiting film in combat with the Eighth Air Force to recruit aerial gunners. Gable had completed his training as an aerial gunner at the end of January 1943 and was promoted to Captain. After the earlier film, Combat America (1943), Gable went to work on Wings Up, recreating much of the training he had gone through. The film ends with a graduation parade attended by General "Hap" Arnold and actress Brenda Marshall.

Stock footage of a Boeing B-17E Flying Fortress is featured in the opening and closing sequences of Wings Up.

== Reception ==
Wings Up was typical of the training and recruitment films of the period produced under the auspices of the Office of War Information.

It was on a list of twenty-one films announced as Academy Award nominees for Short Subject Documentary but the Documentary Award Committee subsequently narrowed the field to seven titles and Wings Up was not included on the final ballot.
