= Chained (1934 film) =

1934 film by Clarence Brown

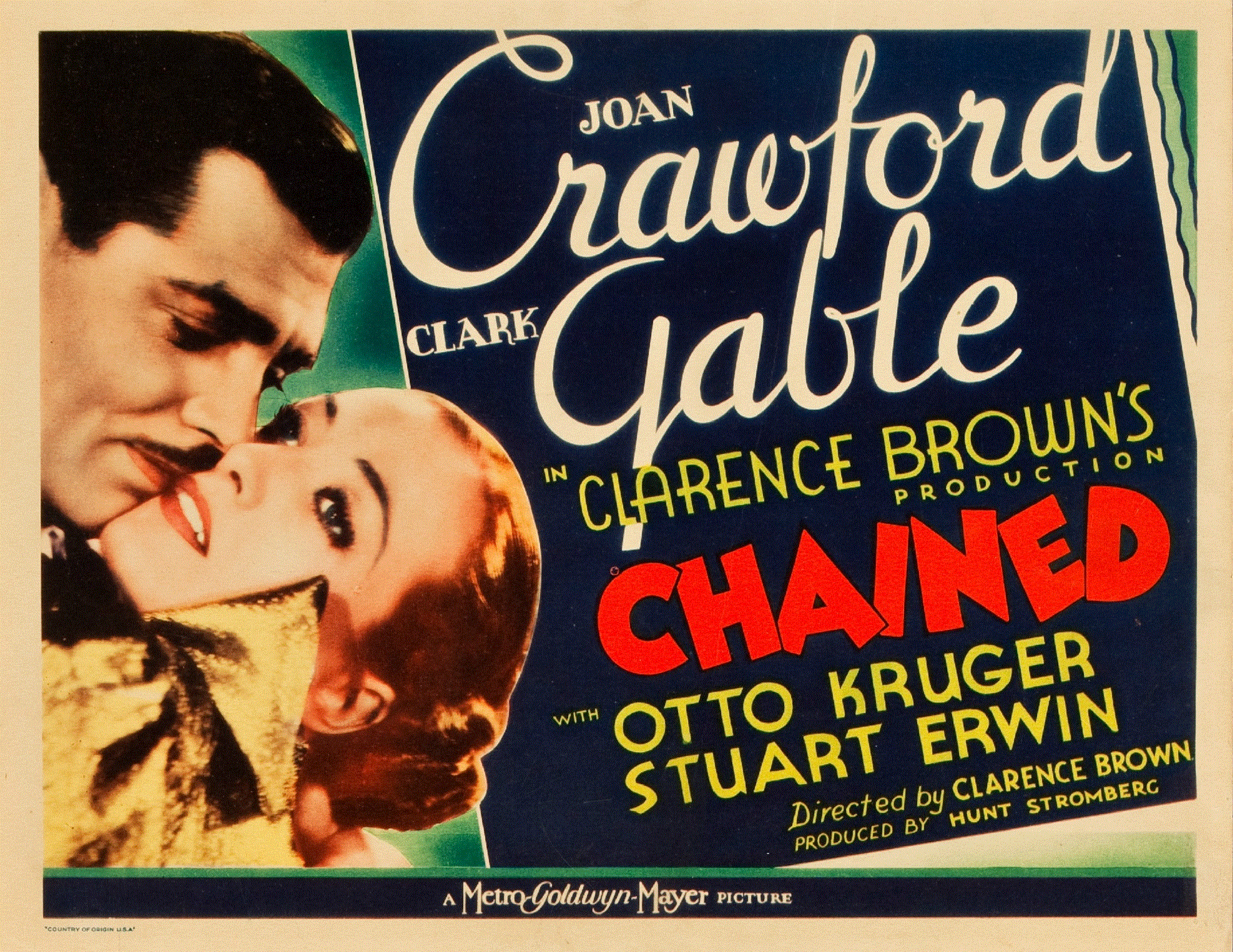
- Lobby card
- Directed by: Clarence Brown
- Screenplay by: Edgar Selwyn (story); John Lee Mahin; Albert Hackett; Frances Goodrich
- Produced by: Hunt Stromberg
- Starring: Joan Crawford; Clark Gable
- Cinematography: George J. Folsey
- Edited by: Robert J. Kern
- Music by: Herbert Stothart
- Production company: Metro-Goldwyn-Mayer
- Distributed by: Loew's, Inc.
- Release date: August 31, 1934
- Running time: 74 minutes
- Country: United States
- Language: English
- Budget: $544,000
- Box office: $1.9 million

Chained is a 1934 American drama film directed by Clarence Brown and starring Joan Crawford and Clark Gable with supporting performances by Otto Kruger, Stuart Erwin, Una O'Connor and Akim Tamiroff. The screenplay was written by John Lee Mahin, Albert Hackett and Frances Goodrich based upon a story by Edgar Selwyn. Ward Bond and Mickey Rooney appear briefly in uncredited roles.

Richard (Kruger), a shipping magnate, asks his wife for a divorce so he can marry his secretary (Crawford). The wife refuses and Diane, who loves him deeply, offers to become his mistress. He is desperately in love with her, but he knows what that would mean to her life. He sends her on a long cruise to think about it. On the cruise, Mike, a charismatic South American rancher (Gable), sets out to seduce her, and they end up falling in love. She returns to New York City to tell Richard, only to find that he has given up his sons and obtained a divorce. They marry. A chance encounter in New York brings the three together, and in the end, Richard lets Diane go to be with the man she loves most.

Chained is the fifth of eight collaborations between Crawford and Gable.

== Plot ==
Eager to marry his devoted secretary Diane Lovering, New York shipping magnate Richard Field asks his wife Louise for a divorce. However, Louise refuses to surrender her social position and denies Richard's request. Although Diane insists that she will continue to love him without the benefit of marriage, Richard asks her to contemplate her choices while cruising to South America on one of his boats. Diane agrees to the cruise, but vows to return to New York unchanged.

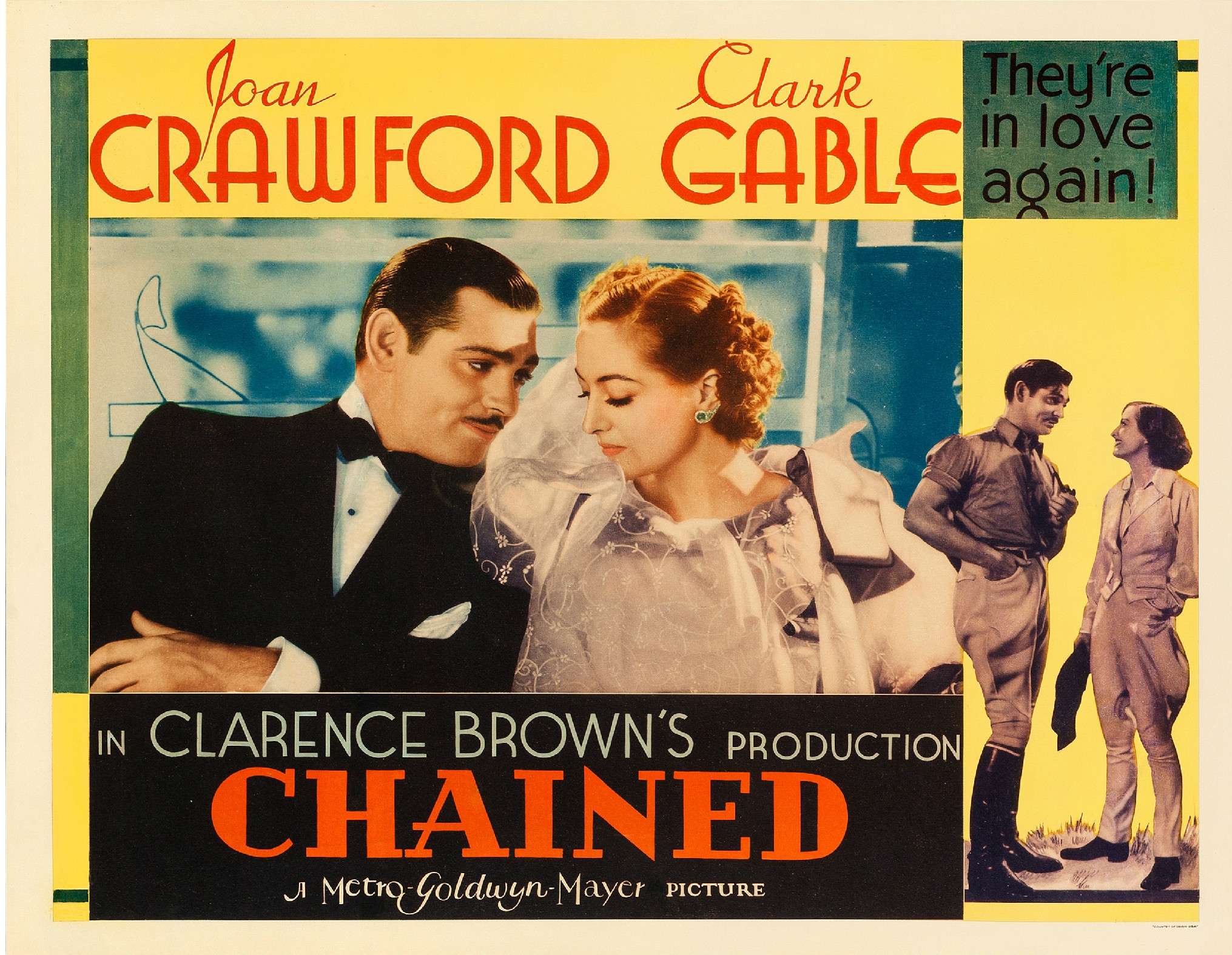
1934 lobby card

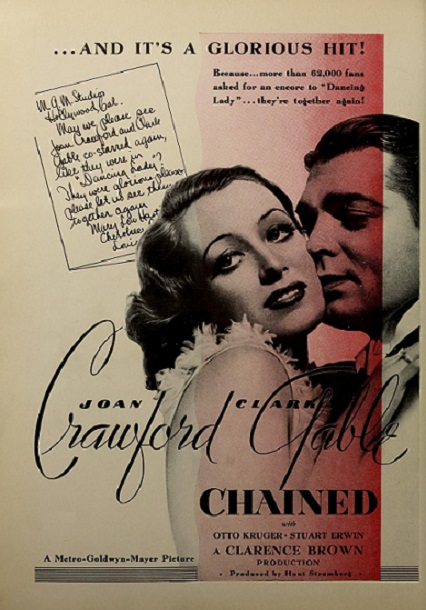
Magazine publicity

Soon after boarding, Diane meets Johnnie Smith in the ship's bar and rejects his flirtations. Johnny asks his smooth-talking best friend Mike Bradley for help but is double-crossed when Mike treats him like a drunk who is annoying Diane. Mike charms her and a shipboard romance blossoms. Still true to Richard, Diane makes no commitments to Mike. He persists, inviting her to visit his ranch in Buenos Aires. After a fun-filled day, Diane and Mike confess their mutual love. Diane finally tells him about Richard, but realizing that Mike is the man whom she truly loves, Diane promises that when she returns to New York, she will end her affair with Richard.

Richard presents Diane with a wedding ring and explains that his wife finally agreed to divorce him under the condition that he not be allowed to see his sons. Overwhelmed by his sacrifice for her, Diane says nothing about her new romance. After writing Mike a "Dear John" letter dumping him, she marries Richard.

A year later, Diane encounters Mike in a New York gun shop and suggests that they dine together. In spite of his bitterness, Mike still loves Diane and senses that she still loves him. Diane explains why she is loyal to Richard. Mike visits their country house and, in spite of Diane's protests, vows to confront his rival. But when Mike sees how kind and caring Richard is with Diane, he relents and leaves. Richard reveals that he had long sensed that she was in love with another man and nobly offers to divorce her. Unchained at last, Diane and Mike begin their married life on his ranch.

== Cast ==
- Joan Crawford as Diane "Dinah" Lovering
- Clark Gable as Michael "Mike" Bradley
- Otto Kruger as Richard I. Field
- Stuart Erwin as John L. "Johnnie" Smith
- Una O'Connor as Amy, Diane's maid
- Marjorie Gateson as Mrs. Louise Field
- Akim Tamiroff as Pablo, the ranch chef
- Ward Bond as ship steward (uncredited)
- Mickey Rooney as boy in shipboard swimming pool (uncredited)

== Production ==
Chained was the first of eight films that Crawford would make with cinematographer George J. Folsey, who discovered a lighting scheme that emphasized Crawford's best features after noticing how the soft light of single small spotlight illuminated her eyes and cheekbones. Crawford was thrilled with the effect and demanded the same type of lighting for the rest of her career.

== Reception ==
The Motion Picture Herald noted, "The showmanship value of the entertainment elements with which this picture deals is long and solidly established. The leading players ...are among the foremost exponents of the type of romantic theme which is its motivation."

New York Herald Tribune theater critic Richard Watts, Jr. noted, "the two stars, who certainly know their business, wisely decide to pass their time tossing charm and personality all over the place, which is obviously what the film requires for audience appeal."

=== Box office ===
According to MGM records, the film earned $1,301,000 in the U.S. and Canada and $687,000 elsewhere, resulting in a profit of $732,000.
