= Polly Walters =

American actress (1913–1994)

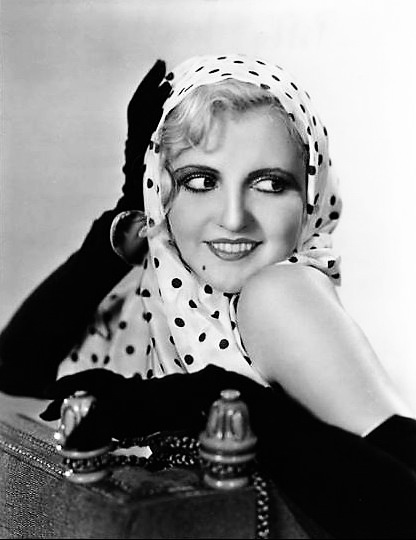
- Walters in 1931
- Born: Maud Walters; January 15, 1913
- Died: March 15, 1994 (aged 81); New York City, U.S.
- Occupation: Actress
- Years active: 1931–1933

Polly Walters (born Maud Walters; January 15, 1913 – March 15, 1994) was an American actress. She is best known for appearing in Smart Money (1931), Blonde Crazy (1931), Young Bride (1932).

Walters's work in films often had her in roles of "wisecracking telephone operators and other dizzy dames in early Warner Bros. talkies". On Broadway, she portrayed Curley Flagg in She Loves Me Not (1933), Lulu Johnson in The Body Beautiful (1935), Peaches La Fleur in Red, Hot and Blue (1936) and Miss Hook in The Life of Reilly (1942). She also was a dancer in vaudeville.

Walters died on March 15, 1994, in New York City at the age of 81.

== Filmography ==
=== Film ===
Year	Title	Role	Notes
1931	Smart Money	Lola	
1931	Gangway	The Gangster's Dumb Moll	short
1931	Five Star Final	Telephone Operator	(uncredited)
1931	Expensive Women	Molly Lane	
1931	Blonde Crazy	Peggy	
1931	Manhattan Parade	Telephone Girl	(uncredited)
1932	Taxi!	Polly - Danny's Date	(uncredited)
1932	High Pressure	Millie	(uncredited)
1932	Union Depot	Mabel	(uncredited)
1932	Fireman, Save My Child!	Telephone Operator	(uncredited)
1932	Play Girl	Ethel, a Salesgirl	(uncredited)
1932	The Mouthpiece	Gladys	(uncredited)
1932	Young Bride	Daisy	
1932	Beauty and the Boss	Ludwig's Girl	(uncredited)
1932	Love Is a Racket	Betty, Switchboard Operator	(uncredited)
1932	Make Me a Star	Doris Randall	(uncredited)
1932	By Whose Hand?	Blonde Cigar Stand Attendant	(uncredited)
1932	American Madness	Blonde Phone Operator	(uncredited)
1933	Pie a la Mode		short
