= List of crime films of the 1930s =

This is a list of crime films released in the 1930s.

Title	Director	Cast	Country	Notes
1930
The Big House	George W. Hill	Chester Morris, Wallace Beery, Robert Montgomery	United States	Prison film
Born Reckless	John Ford, Andrew Bennison	Edmund Lowe, Catherine Dale Owen, Lee Tracy	United States	
The Cat Creeps	Rupert Julian, John Willard	Helen Twelvetrees, Raymond Hackett, Neil Hamilton	United States	
The Doorway to Hell	Archie Mayo	Charles Judels, Lew Ayres, James Cagney	United States	
Manslaughter	George Abbott	Claudette Colbert, Fredric March, Emma Dunn	United States	Crime drama, prison film
Night Owls	James Parrott	Oliver Hardy, Stan Laurel	United States	Crime comedy
Raffles	Harry D'Abbadie D'Arrast, George Fitzmaurice	Ronald Colman, Kay Francis, David Torrence	United States	
The Return of Dr. Fu Manchu	Rowland V. Lee	Warner Oland, Neil Hamilton, Jean Arthur	United States	
The Unholy Three	Jack Conway	Lila Lee, Elliott Nugent, Harry Earles	United States	
1931
Blonde Crazy	Roy Del Ruth	James Cagney, Joan Blondell, Louis Calhern	United States	Gangster film
City Streets	Rouben Mamoulian	Gary Cooper, Sylvia Sidney, Paul Lukas	United States	
Daughter of the Dragon	Lloyd Corrigan	Anna May Wong, Warner Oland, Sessue Hayakawa	United States	
Little Caesar	Mervyn LeRoy	Edward G. Robinson, Douglas Fairbanks, Jr., Glenda Farrell	United States	
Night Nurse	Igor Auzins, William Wellman	Barbara Stanwyck, Ben Lyon, Joan Blondell	United States	
The Public Enemy	William Wellman	James Cagney, Edward Woods, Donald Cook	United States	
Smart Money	Alfred E. Green	Edward G. Robinson, Evelyn Knapp, James Cagney, Ralf Harolde	United States	
1932
Arsene Lupin	Jack Conway	John Barrymore, Lionel Barrymore, Karen Morley	United States	
The Beast of the City	Charles J. Brabin	Walter Huston, Jean Harlow, Wallace Ford	United States	
Fantômas	Paul Fejos	Jean Galland, Thomy Bourdelle, Tania Fédor	France	
The Girl From Chicago	Oscar Micheaux	Eunice Brooks, Starr Calloway, Minta Cato	United States	
Love Is a Racket	William Wellman	Douglas Fairbanks, Jr., Ann Dvorak, Frances Dee Lyle Talbot	United States	Crime drama
The Mask of Fu Manchu	Charles J. Brabin, Charles Vidor, King Vidor	Boris Karloff, Lewis Stone, Karen Morley	United States	
Me and My Gal	Raoul Walsh	Spencer Tracy, Joan Bennett, Marion Burns, George Walsh	United States	
The Mouthpiece	James Flood, Elliott Nugent	Warren William, Aline MacMahon, William Janney	United States	
Night at the Cross Roads	Jean Renoir	Pierre Renoir, Winna Winifred, Jean Gehret	France	
Three on a Match	Mervyn LeRoy	Ann Dvorak, Joan Blondell, Bette Davis, Warren William, Lyle Talbot, Humphrey Bogart	United States	
Scarface	Howard Hawks	Paul Muni, Ann Dvorak, Karen Morley	United States	
	1933			
Lady Killer	Roy Del Ruth	James Cagney, Mae Clarke, Leslie Fenton	United States	Gangster film
The Little Giant	Roy Del Ruth	Edward G. Robinson, Mary Astor, Helen Vinson	United States	
The Mayor of Hell	Archie Mayo	James Cagney, Madge Evans, Allen Jenkins	United States	
The Midnight Club	George Somnes, Alexander Hall	Clive Brook, George Raft, Helen Vinson	United States	
Murders in the Zoo	Edward Sutherland	Charlie Ruggles, Lionell Atwill, Gail Patrick	United States	
Penthouse	W. S. Van Dyke	Warner Baxter, Myrna Loy, Charles Butterworth	United States	
Pick-Up	Marion Gering	Sylvia Sidney, George Raft, William Harrigan	United States	
The Sin of Nora Moran	Philip Goldstone	Zita Johann, Alan Dinehart, Paul Cavanagh	United States	
The Testament of Dr. Mabuse	Fritz Lang	Rudolf Klein-Rogge, Otto Wernicke, Gustav Diessl	Germany	
La tête d'un homme	Julien Duvivier	Gina Manès, Harry Baur, Valery Inkijinoff	France	
1934
Fog Over Frisco	William Dieterle, Daniel Reed	Bette Davis, Lyle Talbot, Donald Woods, Margaret Lindsay	United States	
Limehouse Blues	Alexander Hall	George Raft, Jean Parker, Anna May Wong	United States	
Manhattan Melodrama	W. S. Van Dyke	Clark Gable, William Powell, Myrna Loy	United States	Crime drama
Search for Beauty	Erle C. Kenton	Larry "Buster" Crabbe, Ida Lupino, Toby Wing	United States	
1935
Bulldog Jack	Walter Forde	Jack Hulbert, Fay Wray, Ralph Richardson	United Kingdom	
Crime and Punishment	Pierre Chenal	Harry Baur, Pierre Blanchar, Madeleine Ozeray	France	Crime drama
Crime and Punishment	Josef von Sternberg	Edward Arnold, Peter Lorre, Marian Marsh	United States	Crime drama
G Men	William Keighley	James Cagney, Margaret Lindsay, Lloyd Nolan	United States	
Toni	Jean Renoir	Charles Blavette, Celia Montalván, Jenny Hélia	France	Crime drama
The Whole Town's Talking	John Ford	Edward G. Robinson, Jean Arthur, Wallace Ford	United States	Crime comedy
1936
15 Maiden Lane	Allan Dwan	Claire Trevor, Cesar Romero, Douglas Fowley	United States	
Big Brown Eyes	Raoul Walsh	Joan Bennett, Cary Grant, Walter Pidgeon	United States	
The Crime of Monsieur Lange	Jean Renoir	Jules Berry, René Lefèvre, Sylvia Bataille	France	Crime drama
Fury	Fritz Lang	Spencer Tracy, Sylvia Sidney, Walter Abel	United States	Crime drama
The Petrified Forest	Archie Mayo	Leslie Howard, Bette Davis, Humphrey Bogart	United States	Crime drama
Reefer Madness	Louis J. Gasnier	Dorothy Short, Kenneth Craig, Lillian Miles	United States	Crime drama
1937
L'alibi	Pierre Chenal	Louis Jouvet, Erich von Stroheim, Albert Préjean	France	
Black Legion	Archie Mayo, Michael Curtiz	Humphrey Bogart, Dick Foran, Erin O'Brien-Moore	United States	
Charlie Chan at Monte Carlo	Eugene J. Forde	Warner Oland, Keye Luke, Virginia Field	United States	
Dead End	William Wyler	Sylvia Sidney, Joel McCrea, Humphrey Bogart	United States	
Jump for Glory	Raoul Walsh	Douglas Fairbanks Jr. Valerie Hobson; Alan Hale Sr.	United Kingdom; United States	
Marked Woman	Lloyd Bacon, Michael Curtiz	Bette Davis, Humphrey Bogart, Isabel Jewell	United States	
Pépé le Moko	Julien Duvivier	Jean Gabin, Mireille Balin, Line Noro	France	Gangster film
You Only Live Once	Fritz Lang	Sylvia Sidney, Henry Fonda, Barton MacLane	United States	Crime drama
1938
Algiers	John Cromwell	Charles Boyer, Hedy Lamarr, Sigrid Gurie	United States	Gangster film
The Amazing Dr. Clitterhouse	Anatole Litvak	Edward G. Robinson, Claire Trevor, Humphrey Bogart	United States	Crime comedy
Angels with Dirty Faces	Michael Curtiz	James Cagney, Pat O'Brien, Humphrey Bogart	United States	Crime drama
La Bête Humaine	Jean Renoir	Jean Gabin, Simone Simon, Julien Carette	France	Crime drama
Crime School	Lewis Seiler	Billy Halop, Bobby Jordan, Huntz Hall	United States	Juvenile delinquency film
Dangerous to Know	Robert Florey	Stanley Blystone, Barlowe Borland	United States	
I Am the Law	Alexander Hall	Edward G. Robinson, Barbara O'Neil, Wendy Barrie	United States	
Port of Shadows	Marcel Carné	Michèle Morgan, Jean Gabin, Michel Simon	France	Crime drama
A Slight Case of Murder	Lloyd Bacon	Edward G. Robinson, Jane Bryan, Allen Jenkins	United States	Crime comedy
They Drive by Night	Arthur B. Woods	Emlyn Williams, Ernest Thesiger, Anna Konstam	United Kingdom	
You and Me	Fritz Lang	Sylvia Sidney, George Raft, Robert Cummings	United States	Crime comedy
Young Fugitives	John Rawlins	Robert Wilcox, Dorothea Kent, Harry Davenport	United States	Crime
1939
Blackmail	H. C. Potter	Edward G. Robinson, Ruth Hussey, Gene Lockhart	United States	
Daybreak	Marcel Carné	Jean Gabin, Jules Berry, Arletty	France	Crime drama
Each Dawn I Die	William Keighley	James Cagney, George Raft, Jane Bryan	United States	
I Stole a Million	Frank Tuttle	George Raft, Claire Trevor	United States	
King of the Underworld	Lewis Seiler	Humphrey Bogart, James Stephenson, John Eldredge	United States	
Let Us Live	John Brahm	Maureen O'Sullivan, Henry Fonda, Ralph Bellamy	United States	
The Roaring Twenties	Raoul Walsh	James Cagney, Humphrey Bogart, Priscilla Lane	United States	
You Can't Get Away with Murder	Lewis Seiler	Humphrey Bogart, Gale Page, Billy Halop	United States	
