= 1931 Academy Awards =

1931 Academy Awards may refer to:

- 4th Academy Awards, the Academy Awards ceremony that took place November 10, 1931 honoring films released between August 1, 1930, and July 31, 1931
- 5th Academy Awards, the Academy Awards ceremony that took place November 18, 1932 honoring films released between August 1, 1931, and July 31, 1932
