= The Public Enemy =

1931 film by William A. Wellman

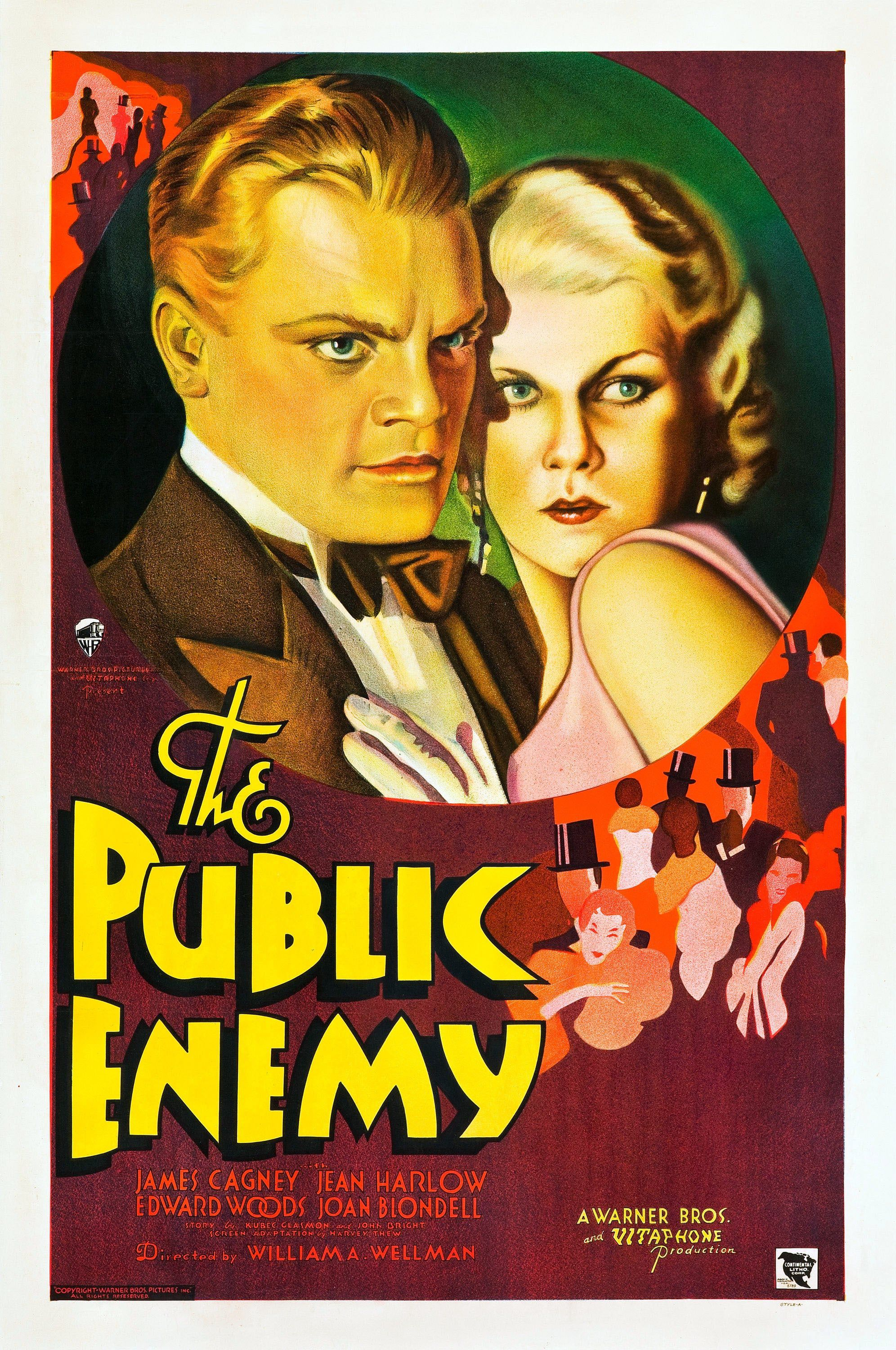
- Theatrical release poster
- Directed by: William A. Wellman
- Written by: Kubec Glasmon; John Bright
- Screenplay by: Harvey F. Thew
- Based on: Beer and Blood by: John Bright; Kubec Glasmon
- Produced by: Darryl F. Zanuck
- Starring: James Cagney; Jean Harlow; Edward Woods; Joan Blondell
- Cinematography: Devereaux Jennings
- Edited by: Edward Michael McDermott
- Distributed by: Warner Bros. Pictures
- Release date: April 23, 1931
- Running time: 83 minutes
- Country: United States
- Language: English
- Budget: $151,000 or $230,000
- Box office: $557,000

The Public Enemy (Enemies of the Public in the UK) is a 1931 American pre-Code gangster film produced and distributed by Warner Bros. Pictures. The film was directed by William A. Wellman, and starring James Cagney, Jean Harlow, Edward Woods, Donald Cook and Joan Blondell. The film relates the story of a young man's rise in the criminal underworld in Prohibition-era urban America.

Supporting actors include Beryl Mercer, Murray Kinnell, and Mae Clarke. The screenplay is based on an unpublished novel—Beer and Blood by two former newspapermen, John Bright and Kubec Glasmon—who had witnessed some of Al Capone's murderous gang rivalries in Chicago.

In 1998, The Public Enemy was selected for preservation in the United States National Film Registry by the Library of Congress as being "culturally, historically, or aesthetically significant". As a published work from 1931, The Public Enemy will enter the American public domain on January 1, 2027.

== Plot ==
Foreword · It is the ambition of the authors of "The Public Enemy" to honestly depict an environment that exists today in a certain strata of American life, rather than glorify the hoodlum or the criminal. While the story of "The Public Enemy" is essentially a true story, all names and characters appearing herein, are purely fictional.

As youngsters in 1900s Chicago, Irish-Americans Tom Powers and his lifelong friend Matt Doyle engage in petty theft, selling stolen items to "Putty Nose". Putty Nose persuades them to join his gang on a fur warehouse robbery, assuring them he will take care of them if anything goes wrong. When Tom is startled by a taxidermied bear, he shoots it, alerting the police, who kill gang member Larry Dalton. When they go to Putty Nose for help, they find he has fled.

Tom's straitlaced older brother, Mike, tries and fails to talk Tom into giving up crime. Tom keeps his activities secret from his doting mother. When the United States enters World War I in 1917, Mike enlists in the Marines. Their mother pleads with Tom not to do the same, and he promises, staying behind.

In 1920, with Prohibition about to go into effect, Paddy Ryan recruits Tom and Matt as beer "salesmen" (enforcers) in his bootlegging business. He allies himself with noted gangster Samuel "Nails" Nathan. As the bootlegging business becomes ever more lucrative, Tom and Matt flaunt their wealth.

Mike finds out that his brother's money comes not from politics, as Tom claims, but from bootlegging, and declares that Tom's success is based on nothing more than "beer and blood". Tom retorts in disgust: "Your hands ain't so clean. You killed and liked it. You didn't get them medals for holding hands with them Germans."

Tom and Matt acquire girlfriends, Kitty and Mamie, respectively. Tom eventually tires of Kitty; when she complains once too often, he angrily pushes half a grapefruit into her face. He then drops her for Gwen Allen. At a restaurant on the night of Matt's wedding reception to Mamie, Tom and Matt recognize Putty Nose and follow him home. Begging for his life, Putty plays a song on the piano that he had entertained Tom and Matt with when they were children. Tom shoots him dead, while a dazed Matt watches.

Tom gives his mother a large wad of money, but Mike rejects the gift. Tom tears up the banknotes and throws them in his brother's face. "Nails" Nathan dies in a horse-riding accident, prompting Tom to buy the horse and shoot it. A rival gang headed by "Schemer" Burns takes advantage of the disarray resulting from Nathan's death, precipitating a gang war.

Paddy gets his members holed up in an apartment while he nervously leaves to work a deal with Burns, somehow, as they are outnumbered. He takes their guns and money away hoping this will keep them in hiding, and is seen leaving the place by a Burns' gang member. Later in the night Paddy's girlfriend forces herself sexually on Tom when he is drunk. In the morning Tom, disgusted, leaves with his loyal friend Matt following him. Matt is immediately gunned down in a barrage of machine gun fire but Tom escapes narrowly. Furious, Tom steals a pair of .38s and single-handedly goes to settle scores with Burns and some of his men but is seriously wounded in the shootout and ends up in the hospital. When his mother, brother, and Matt's sister Molly come to see him, he reconciles with Mike and agrees to reform. However, Paddy drops by their home later to warn Mike that Tom has been kidnapped from the hospital by the Burns' mob. He also gives Mike hope that he will bring Tom back somehow, with news that he has offered to quit and leave the racket to Burns, hoping that he would not kill Tom. During dinner, a gang member, presumed to be from Paddy's gang, telephones to tell an anxious Mike that Tom is returning from the hospital; their mother is overjoyed and begins preparing Tom's bedroom. When Mike answers a knock on the door, Tom's tied-up body is propped against it, and he falls dead onto the floor. The film closes with Mike getting up and walking slowly towards the motionless camera that is still on the floor continuing to frame the lifeless Tom.

The end of Tom Powers is the end of every hoodlum. "The Public Enemy" is not a man, nor is it a character -- it is a problem that sooner or later we, the public, must solve. –Closing caption

== Cast ==
- James Cagney as Tom Powers
- Jean Harlow as Gwen Allen
- Edward Woods as Matt Doyle
- Joan Blondell as Mamie
- Donald Cook as Mike Powers
- Leslie Fenton as Nails Nathan
- Beryl Mercer as Ma Powers
- Robert O'Connor as Paddy Ryan
- Murray Kinnell as Putty Nose

=== Uncredited ===
- Mae Clarke as Kitty
- Frank Coghlan Jr. as Tom as a boy
- Frankie Darro as Matt as a boy
- Snitz Edwards as Miller
- Rita Flynn as Molly Doyle
- Douglas Gerrard as assistant tailor
- Robert E. Homans as Officer Pat Burke
- Eddie Kane as Joe
- Mia Marvin as Jane
- Sam McDaniel as head waiter
- Helen Parrish as little girl
- Lee Phelps as Steve
- Russ Powell as bartender
- Purnell Pratt as Officer Powers
- Landers Stevens as doctor
- William H. Strauss as pawnbroker
- Charles Sullivan as Mug
- Lucille Ward as Mrs. Dalton
- Adele Watson as Mrs. Doyle

== Production ==
=== Development ===
The screenplay, which was written by Harvey F. Thew, was based on an unpublished novel, Beer and Blood, by John Bright and Kubec Glasmon. Bright and Glasmon based their novel on actual people, having witnessed some of Al Capone's murderous gang rivalries in Chicago. Warner Bros. studio head Jack L. Warner bought the rights to the novel and assigned director William A. Wellman to direct the film. Wellman, who had served in World War I, like the brother of the main character, told Warner: "I'll bring you the toughest, most violent picture you ever did see".

=== Casting ===
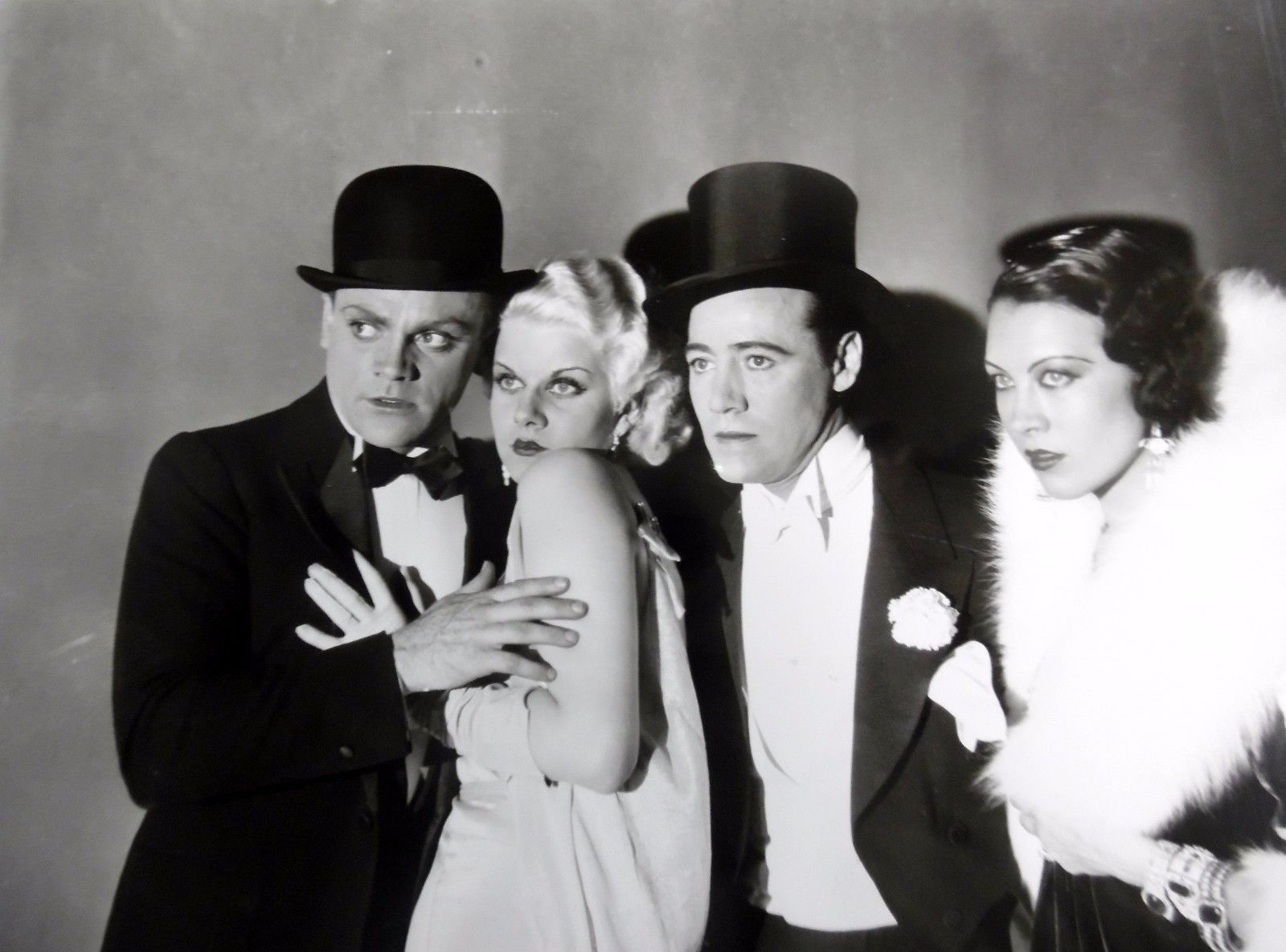
James Cagney, Jean Harlow, Leslie Fenton, and Dorothy Gee in a publicity still for the film

Edward Woods was originally cast in the lead role of Tom Powers and James Cagney was cast as Tom's best friend Matt Doyle, until director Wellman decided Cagney would be more effective in the part and switched the two actors but never reshot the sequences with the characters as children, which is why the child playing Cagney's role looks like Woods while the one playing Woods' role looks like Cagney. Another reason for the switch was that the sound technology used in The Public Enemy was superior to that used in earlier films, making it no longer imperative to have an actor in the lead role who had impeccable enunciation.

Louise Brooks was the original choice for Gwen Allen, a woman with a self-confessed weakness for bad men. She refused the role, which went to a younger actress, Jean Harlow. Brooks' name was in studio records/casting call lists playing "Bess" in this movie, but she and her character did not appear. Brooks later explained herself to Wellman (who had directed her in Beggars of Life (1928)) by saying that she hated making pictures because she simply "hated Hollywood". In the opinion of Brooks's biographer Barry Paris, "turning down Public Enemy marked the real end of Louise Brooks's film career".

Tom's first girlfriend Kitty was played by Mae Clarke, who was uncredited. Kitty is eventually dumped by Tom for Gwen. Joan Blondell played Mamie, Matt's girlfriend. She had already worked with Cagney in Sinners' Holiday (1930) and would work with him on two films which also came out that year: Other Men's Women and Blonde Crazy. Other films that they worked together on were The Crowd Roars (1932), Footlight Parade (1933) and He Was Her Man (1934). Donald Cook played Tom's brother, Mike.

=== Filming ===
Filming took place in January and February 1931, with a small budget of $151,000. During filming, Cagney also made Smart Money, co-starring Edward G. Robinson, who had finished his breakthrough film Little Caesar.

In the scene where Mike Powers punches his brother Tom, Wellman privately took Donald Cook aside and, explaining his desire for authenticity in Tom's reaction, asked the actor to really hit Cagney. Cook played his part a bit too well, and he struck Cagney in the mouth with such force, he actually broke one of Cagney's teeth.

In another incident, live ammunition was used in a scene where Tom Powers ducks around the corner of a building to take cover from machine gun fire. The use of live ammunition was common practice at the time. The bullets struck the wall of the building at the position where Cagney's head had been just a moment before.

=== Grapefruit scene ===
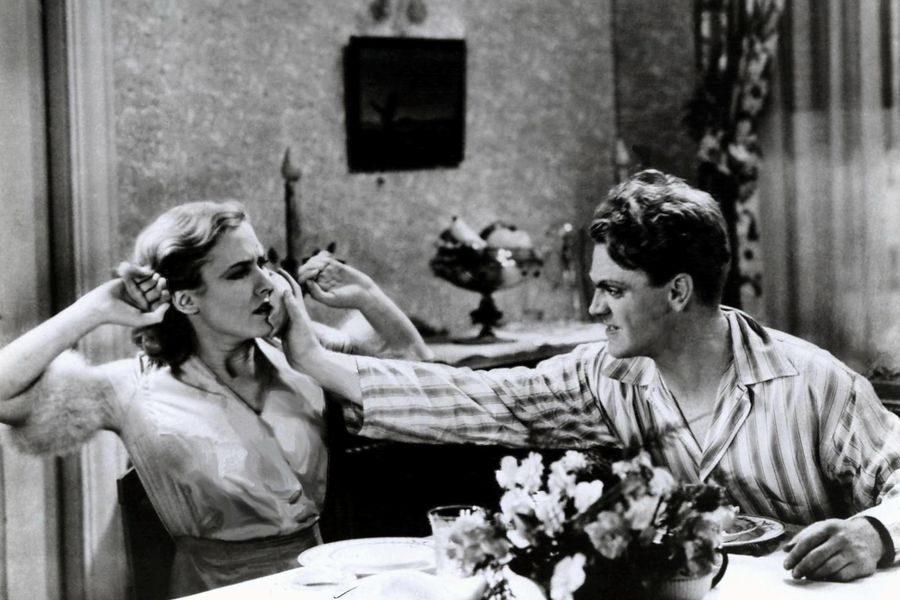
A controversial scene in which Tom (James Cagney) angrily smashes a half grapefruit into his girlfriend's face (Mae Clarke)

In a 1973 interview featured in the Turner Classic Movies documentary The Men Who Made The Movies: William Wellman, Wellman said he added the grapefruit "hitting" to the scene, because when he and his wife at the time would get into fights, she would never talk or give any expression. Since she always had a grapefruit for breakfast, he always wanted to put the grapefruit into her face just to get a reaction out of her, so she would show some emotion; he felt that this scene gave him the opportunity to rid himself of that temptation.

Some, such as film critic Ben Mankiewicz, have asserted that Mae Clarke's surprised and seemingly somewhat angry reaction to the grapefruit was genuine, as she had not been told to expect the unscripted action. However, in her autobiography, Clarke wrote that Cagney had told her prior to that take what he planned to do. Her only genuine surprise came later when she saw the grapefruit scene appear in the final film as it had been her understanding that they were shooting it only as a joke to amuse the crew.

According to Cagney, Clarke's ex-husband had the grapefruit scene timed, and would buy a ticket just before that scene went onscreen, go enjoy the scene, leave, then come back during the next show just in time to see only that scene again. The scene was parodied 30 years later in the 1961 Cagney movie One, Two, Three when Cagney threatens Otto (Horst Buchholz) with a half grapefruit but then decides against doing so.

=== Prologue and epilogue ===
The film featured a prologue "apprising the audience that the hoodlums and terrorists of the underworld must be exposed and the glamour ripped from them" and an epilogue "pointing the moral that civilization is on her knees and inquiring loudly as to what is to be done." At the film's premiere in New York City, the film's prologue was preceded by a "brief stage tableau, with sinuous green lighting, which shows a puppet gangster shooting another puppet gangster in the back."

== Music ==
The soundtrack included the following songs:

- "I'm Forever Blowing Bubbles"
- "Hesitation Blues"
- "Toot, Toot, Tootsie (Goo' Bye!)"
- "Maple Leaf Rag"
- "Brighten the Corner Where You Are"
- "Smiles"
- "I Surrender Dear"

The music was performed by the Vitaphone Orchestra, led by conductor David Mendoza.

== Reception ==
=== Box office ===
According to Warner Bros. figures the film earned $464,000 domestically and $93,000 internationally.

=== Critical response ===
On the review aggregator website Rotten Tomatoes, 100% of 33 critics' reviews are positive, with an average rating of 8.3/10.

Andre Sennwald, who reviewed the film for The New York Times on its April 1931 release, called it "just another gangster film at the Strand, weaker than most in its story, stronger than most in its acting, and, like most, maintaining a certain level of interest through the last burst of machine-gun fire"; Woods and Cagney give "remarkably lifelike portraits of young hoodlums" and "Beryl Mercer as Tom's mother, Robert Emmett O'Connor as a gang chief, and Donald Cook as Tom's brother, do splendidly."

Time magazine called The Public Enemy "well-told" and noted, "Unlike City Streets, this is not a Hugoesque fable of gangsters fighting among themselves, but a documentary drama of the bandit standing against society. It carries to its ultimate absurdity the fashion for romanticizing gangsters, for even in defeat the public enemy is endowed with grandeur." Variety called it "low-brow material given such workmanship as to make it high-brow" which attempts to "square everything [with] a foreword and postscript moralizing on the gangster as a menace to the public welfare."

A theatre in Times Square ran The Public Enemy 24 hours a day during its initial release. At the 4th Academy Awards, the film was nominated for an Academy Award for Best Story, losing to The Dawn Patrol.

Teaser trailer of The Public Enemy

== Subsequent recognition ==
In 1989, an animatronics version of a scene from The Public Enemy was incorporated into The Great Movie Ride at the Disney-MGM Studios theme park in Orlando, Florida.

In 1998, The Public Enemy was selected for preservation in the United States National Film Registry by the Library of Congress as being "culturally, historically, or aesthetically significant".

In 2001, the Sopranos episode "Proshai, Livushka" featured title character Tony Soprano watching scenes from the film, becoming overwhelmed with emotion.

In 2003 the character of Tom Powers was among the AFI's 100 Years...100 Heroes and Villains, placing 42nd in the villain list. In 2008, the film appeared on one of the AFI's 10 Top 10 lists—the best ten films in ten "classic" American film genres. The Public Enemy was listed as the eighth best in the gangster film genre.

In 2025, The Hollywood Reporter listed The Public Enemy as having the best stunts of 1930 to 1931.

== Re-releases ==
The film was re-released in 1941 after the Production Code was put into effect. Three scenes from the film were cut because of the Code. One is of a markedly effeminate tailor measuring Tom for a suit, another where Mamie serves Matt breakfast in bed, and the third showing Tom being raped by Paddy Ryan's girlfriend while hiding out in her apartment. These three scenes were later restored.

The film was re-released again in 1954, with a written prologue added before the opening credits, advising that gangsters such as Tom Powers and Caesar "Rico" Bandello, the title character in Little Caesar (played by Edward G. Robinson), are a menace that the public must confront.

== Preservation status ==
As with many a Warner/First National pre-code talkie, a print has been in the Library of Congress since the 1970s. The film has been available to the public for several decades, due to several video and DVD releases.

=== Legacy ===
In the 90s and early 2000s, wrestlers Rocco Rock and Johnny Grunge used the title of the movie when they formed the tag team The Public Enemy in companies like WWE, WCW, and ECW. They are both in the Hardcore Hall of Fame.

== See also ==
- List of crime films of the 1930s
