= Guy Kibbee =

American actor (1882–1956)

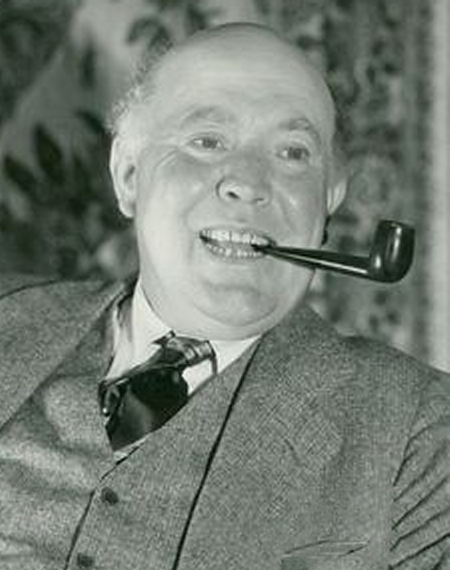
- Kibbee in the 1940s
- Born: Guy Bridges Kibbee; March 6, 1882; El Paso, Texas, U.S.
- Died: May 24, 1956 (aged 74); East Islip, New York, U.S.
- Occupation: Actor
- Years active: 1902–1950
- Spouses: Helen Shay (m. 1918; div. 1923) Ethel Reed (m. 1925)

Guy Bridges Kibbee (March 6, 1882 – May 24, 1956) was an American stage and film actor.

== Early years ==
Kibbee was born in El Paso, Texas. His father was editor of the El Paso Herald-Post newspaper, and Kibbee learned how to set type at age 7. At the age of 14, he ran away to join a traveling show. His younger brother was actor Milton Kibbee.

== Career ==
Kibbee began his entertainment career on Mississippi riverboats. He became an actor in traveling stock companies. He began to lose his hair at 19. In his early days on stage, he was a romantic leading man.

In 1930, he made his debut on Broadway in the play Torch Song, which won acclaim in New York and attracted the interest of Hollywood. Shortly afterwards, Paramount Pictures signed Kibbee, and he moved to California. He later became part of the Warner Bros. stock company, contract actors who cycled through different productions in supporting roles. Kibbee's specialty was daft and jovial characters; he is perhaps best remembered for the films The Dark Horse (1932), 42nd Street (1933), Gold Diggers of 1933 (1933), Captain Blood (1935), and Mr. Smith Goes to Washington (1939), though he also played the expatriate inn owner in Joan Crawford's Rain (1932). One of his few starring performances during this period was the title role of Babbitt (1934), a much altered and compressed version of the Sinclair Lewis novel.

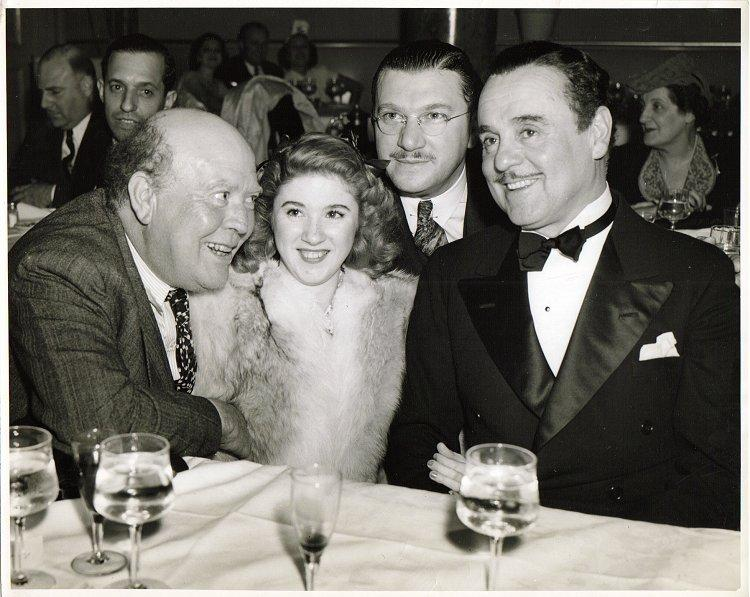
Guy Kibbee (left), Dr. Irving Leroy Ress (center back), Leo Carrillo (right), c. 1950

He is also remembered for his performance as Mr. Webb, editor of the Grover's Corners, New Hampshire newspaper, and father of Emily Webb (played by Martha Scott) in the film version of the classic Thornton Wilder play Our Town.

== Personal life ==
Kibbee's first wife was Helen Shay, with whom he raised a family in Staten Island until their divorce. One of their sons was Robert Kibbee, an academic who became chancellor of the City University of New York.

His second wife was the former Ethel "Brownie" Reed. They had a daughter, Shirley Ann, and were married for 31 years.

== Death ==
Kibbee died of Parkinson's disease at the Percy Williams Home for actors in East Islip, New York, on May 24, 1956.

== In popular culture ==
"Guy Kibbee eggs" is a breakfast dish consisting of a hole cut out of the center of a slice of bread, and an egg cracked into it, all of which is fried in a skillet. The actor prepared this dish in the 1935 Warner Bros. film Mary Jane's Pa, hence the nickname. The dish is also known by other names, such as "egg in a basket", "egg in a frame", "Rocky Mountain Toast", and "Frog in a Hole".

Kibbee is also mentioned in the iconic Hot August Night concert/album performed by Neil Diamond in 1972 at the Greek Theatre in Los Angeles:

Thank you people in the audience! Tree people out there, God bless ya, I'm singin' for you too! Are you still there tree people? (laughter) This is, this is the Greek Theatre. This is the place that God made for performers when they die, they go to a place called the Greek Theatre. And you're met there by an MC, wearing a long robe and smoking a cigar, looks like Guy Kibbee, and that's what it is. It's performers' paradise.

== Filmography ==
Year	Title	Role	Notes
1931	For Sale	Mr. Hart	Short, Uncredited
1931	Stolen Heaven	Police Commissioner	Film debut
1931	Man of the World	Harry Taylor	
1931	City Streets	Pop Cooley	
1931	Laughing Sinners	Cass Wheeler	
1931	How I Play Golf, by Bobby Jones No. 6: 'The Big Irons'		Short, Uncredited
1931	Side Show	Colonel Gowdy	
1931	New Adventures of Get Rich Quick Wallingford	Police Sergeant McGonigal	
1931	Flying High	Fred Smith	
1931	Blonde Crazy	A. Rupert Johnson Jr.	
1932	Union Depot	Scrap Iron Scratch	Alternative title: Gentleman for a Day
1932	Taxi!	Pop Riley	
1932	High Pressure	Clifford Gray	
1932	Fireman, Save My Child	Pop Devlin	
1932	Play Girl	Finkelwald	
1932	The Crowd Roars	Pop Greer	
1932	The Mouthpiece	Bartender	
1932	Two Seconds	Bookie	
1932	The Strange Love of Molly Louvain	Pop	
1932	The Dark Horse	Zachary Hicks	
1932	Winner Take All	Pop Slavin	
1932	Crooner	Mike	
1932	Big City Blues	Hummell	
1932	Rain	Joe Horn	
1932	Scarlet Dawn	Mr. Murphy	
1932	The Conquerors	Dr. Blake	
1932	Central Park	Charlie Cabot	
1933	42nd Street	Abner Dillon	
1933	Girl Missing	Kenneth Van Dusen	
1933	Lilly Turner	Doc McGill	
1933	Gold Diggers of 1933	Faneul H. Peabody	
1933	The Life of Jimmy Dolan	Phlaxer	Alternative title: The Kid's Last Fight
1933	The Silk Express	Detective McDuff	
1933	How to Break 90 #2: Position and Back Swing	Uncredited	Short, Uncredited
1933	Lady for a Day	Judge Henry G. Blake	
1933	Footlight Parade	Si Gould	
1933	Havana Widows	Deacon R. Jones	
1933	The World Changes	James Clafflin	
1933	Convention City	George Ellerbe	Lost film
1934	Easy to Love	Justice of the Peace	
1934	Wonder Bar	Simpson	
1934	Harold Teen	Joe "Pa" Lovewell	
1934	Merry Wives of Reno	Tom Fraser	
1934	The Merry Frinks	Uncle Newt Frink	
1934	Dames	Horace Peter Hemingway	
1934	Big Hearted Herbert	Herbert [Kalness]	
1934	Babbitt	George F. Babbitt	Title role
1935	While the Patient Slept	[Police Lieutenant] Lance O'Leary	
1935	Mary Jane's Pa	Sam Preston	
1935	Going Highbrow	Matt Upshaw	
1935	Don't Bet on Blondes	Colonel Jefferson Davis Youngblood	
1935	I Live for Love	Henderson	
1935	Captain Blood	Hagthorpe	
1936	Little Lord Fauntleroy	Silas Hobbs	
1936	Captain January	Captain January	
1936	I Married a Doctor	Samuel Clark	
1936	The Big Noise	Julius Trent	
1936	Earthworm Tractors	Sam Johnson	
1936	M'Liss	Washoe Smith	
1936	The Captain's Kid	Asa Plunkett	
1936	Three Men on a Horse	Carver	
1937	Mama Steps Out	Leonard "Len" Cuppy	
1937	Don't Tell the Wife	Malcolm J. "Dinky" Winthrop	
1937	Jim Hanvey, Detective	James Woolford "Jim" Hanvey	
1937	Mountain Justice	Doctor John Aloysius Barnard	
1937	Riding on Air	J. Rutherford "Doc" Waddington	
1937	The Big Shot	Dr. Bertram Simms	
1937	The Bad Man of Brimstone	Francis X. "Eight Ball" Harrison	
1938	Of Human Hearts	George Ames	
1938	Joy of Living	Dennis Garret	
1938	Three Comrades	Alfons	
1938	Rich Man, Poor Girl	Pa Thayer	
1938	Three Loves Has Nancy	Pa Briggs	
1939	Let Freedom Ring	David Bronson	
1939	It's a Wonderful World	Fred "Cap" Streeter	
1939	Babes in Arms	Judge John Black	
1939	Mr. Smith Goes to Washington	Governor Hubert "Happy" Hopper	
1939	Bad Little Angel	Luther Marvin	
1939	Henry Goes Arizona	Judge Van Treece	
1940	Our Town	Mr. Webb	
1940	Street of Memories	Harry Brent	
1940	Chad Hanna	Huguenine	
1941	Scattergood Baines	Scattergood Baines	
1941	Scattergood Pulls the Strings	Scattergood Baines	
1941	Scattergood Meets Broadway	Scattergood Baines	
1941	It Started with Eve	Bishop Maxwell	
1941	Design for Scandal	Judge Graham	
1942	This Time for Keeps	Harry Bryant	
1942	Scattergood Rides High	Scattergood Baines	
1942	Sunday Punch	"Pops" Muller	
1942	Miss Annie Rooney	Grandpa Rooney	
1942	There's One Born Every Minute	Lester Cadwalader, Sr.	
1942	Tish	Judge Horace Bowser	
1942	Scattergood Survives a Murder	Scattergood Baines	
1942	Whistling in Dixie	Judge George Lee	
1943	Cinderella Swings It	Scattergood Baines	
1943	Power of the Press	Ulysses Bradford	
1943	Girl Crazy	Dean Phineas Armour	
1943	Learn and Live	Saint Peter	
1944	Dixie Jamboree	Captain Jackson of the Ellabella	
1945	The Horn Blows at Midnight	Radio Director/The Chief	
1946	Cowboy Blues	Dusty Nelson	
1946	Singing on the Trail	Dusty Wyatt	Alternative title: Lookin' for Someone
1946	Gentleman Joe Palooka	Uncle Charlie	
1946	Lone Star Moonlight	Amos Norton	Alternative title: Amongst the Thieves
1947	Over the Santa Fe Trail	Biscuits	
1947	The Red Stallion	Ed Thompson	
1947	The Romance of Rosy Ridge	Cal Baggett	
1948	Fort Apache	Captain Dr. Wilkens	Alternative title: War Party
1948	3 Godfathers	Judge	Final film

== Television appearances ==
Year	Title	Role	Notes
1948	Kraft Television Theatre	Ed	1 episode
1949–1950	The Chevrolet Tele-Theatre		4 episodes
1950	The Billy Rose Show		1 episode, (final appearance)
