= Young Bride =

1932 American film directed by William A. Seiter

- Directed by: William A. Seiter
- Screenplay by: Garrett Fort; Ralph Murphy; Jane Murfin
- Based on: Veneer; 1929 play by Hugh Stanislaus Stange
- Produced by: Harry Joe Brown
- Starring: Helen Twelvetrees; Eric Linden; Arline Judge; Roscoe Ates; Polly Walters
- Cinematography: Arthur C. Miller
- Edited by: Joseph Kane
- Music by: Max Steiner
- Production company: RKO Pictures
- Distributed by: RKO Pictures
- Release date: April 8, 1932
- Running time: 76 minutes
- Country: United States
- Language: English

Young Bride is a 1932 American pre-Code drama film directed by William A. Seiter and written by Garrett Fort, Ralph Murphy and Jane Murfin. The film stars Helen Twelvetrees, Eric Linden, Arline Judge, Roscoe Ates and Polly Walters. The film was released on April 8, 1932, by RKO Pictures.

== Cast ==
- Helen Twelvetrees as Allie Smith Riggs
- Polly Walters as Daisy
- Eric Linden as Charlie Riggs
- Arline Judge as Maisie
- Roscoe Ates as Mike, the Pool Room Bartender
- Blanche Friderici as Miss Margaret Gordon, the Librarian
- Cliff Edwards as Pete
- Edwin Maxwell as The Doctor
- Phyllis Crane as The Taxi Dancer
- Edmund Breese as Mr. C. B. Chadwick, the Broker
