= My Woman (film) =

1933 film by Victor Schertzinger

- Directed by: Victor Schertzinger
- Screenplay by: Brian Marlow
- Starring: Helen Twelvetrees; Victor Jory; Wallace Ford
- Cinematography: Benjamin H. Kline (as Benjamin Kline)
- Edited by: Ray Curtiss (as Ray Curtis); Gene Milford
- Music by: Victor Schertzinger
- Production company: Columbia Pictures
- Distributed by: Columbia Pictures
- Release date: October 5, 1933
- Running time: 76 minutes
- Country: United States
- Language: English

My Woman is a 1933 American pre-Code drama romance film directed by Victor Schertzinger and starring Helen Twelvetrees, Victor Jory and Wallace Ford.

== Plot ==
A devoted wife helps her husband achieve success as a radio comic, but stardom comes at a price.

== Cast ==
- Helen Twelvetrees as Connie Riley Rollins
- Victor Jory as John Bradley
- Wallace Ford as Chick Rollins
- Claire Dodd as Muriel Bennett
- Hobart Cavanaugh as Mr. Miller
- Harry Holman as Lou
- Charles Lane as Conn (as Charles Levison)
- Raymond Brown as Pop Riley
