= 4th Academy Awards =

- Date: November 10, 1931
- Site: Biltmore Hotel; Los Angeles, California
- Hosted by: Lawrence Grant

Highlights
- Best Picture: Cimarron
- Most awards: Cimarron (3)
- Most nominations: Cimarron (7)

The 4th Academy Awards were held on November 10, 1931, by the Academy of Motion Picture Arts and Sciences, awarding films released between August 1, 1930, and July 31, 1931. Cimarron was the first Western to win Best Picture, and would remain the only to do so until Dances With Wolves won in 1990. Cimarron received a then-record seven nominations, one in every category for which it was eligible, and was the first Best Picture winner to win more than two awards; it and A Free Soul were the first films to receive multiple acting nominations.

Nine-year-old Jackie Cooper was the first child actor to receive a nomination and was the youngest nominee until Justin Henry received a nomination for his performance in 1979's Kramer vs. Kramer at age eight. He remains the second-youngest Oscar nominee of all time, and the only Best Actor nominee under age 18. At the ceremony, he fell asleep on the shoulder of Best Actress nominee Marie Dressler; when Dressler was announced as the winner, Cooper had to be eased onto his mother's lap.

Vice President Charles Curtis attended the ceremony to address the 1,800 guests, making the ceremony a national event.

Best Actor winner Lionel Barrymore became the first person to have received nominations in multiple categories, having been nominated for Best Director for Madame X at the 2nd Academy Awards, as well as the only Best Actor winner born in the 1870s.

== Winners and nominees ==
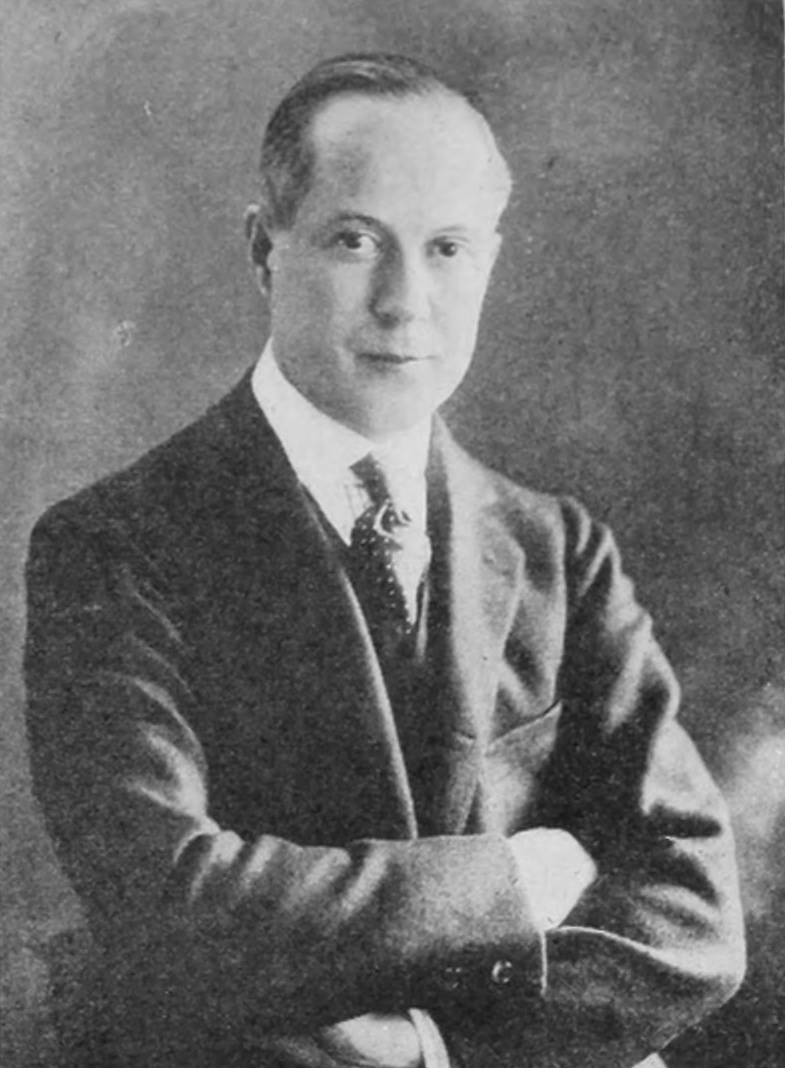
William LeBaron; Best Picture winner

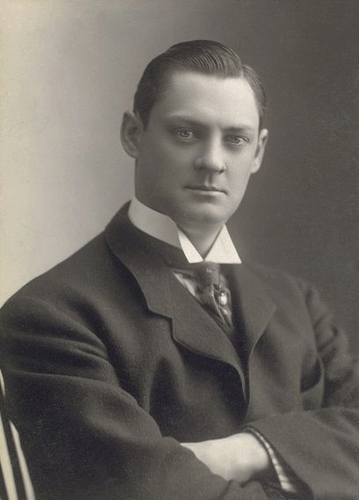
Lionel Barrymore; Best Actor winner

Marie Dressler; Best Actress winner

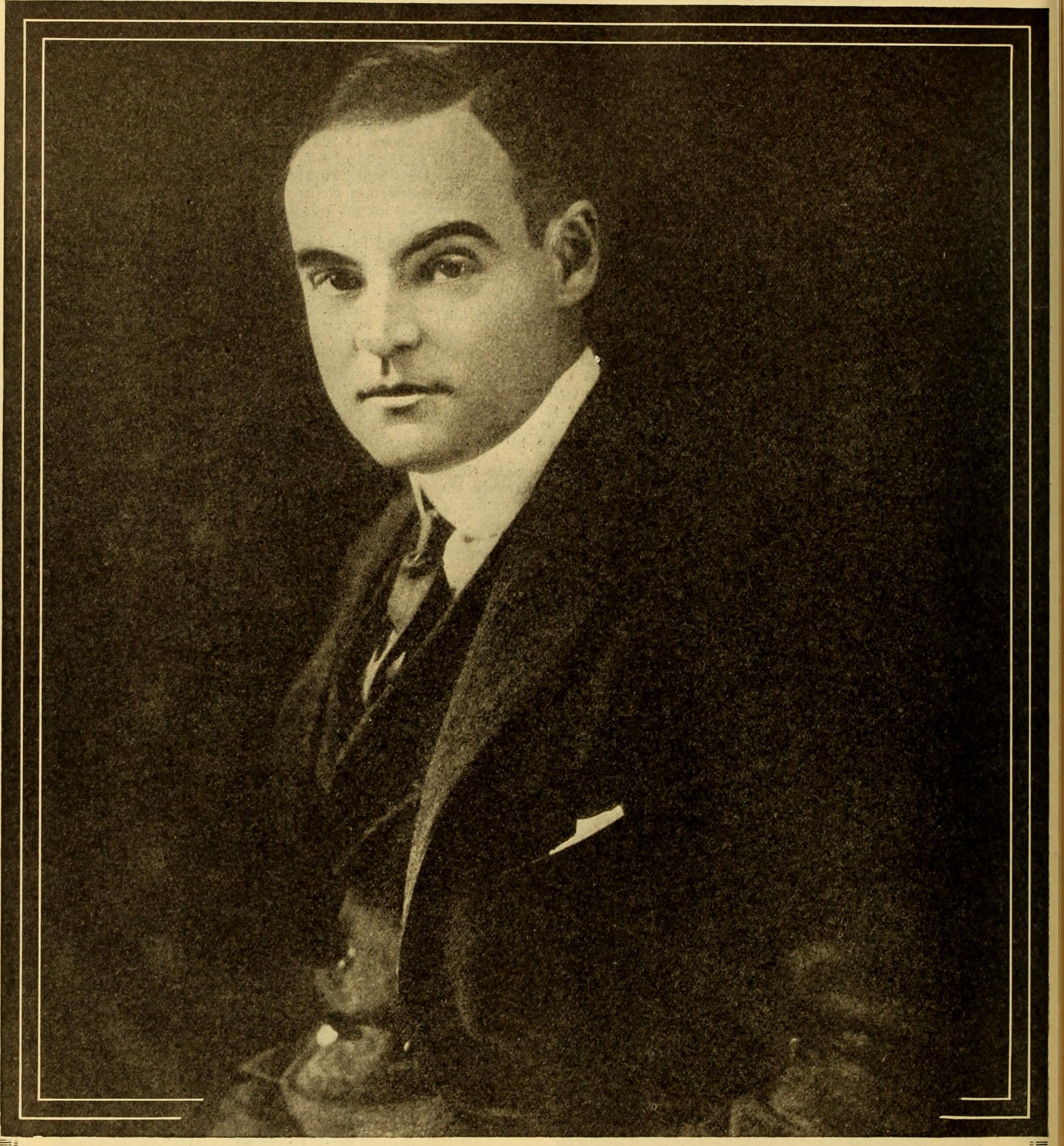
Howard Estabrook; Best Adaptation winner

Nominees were announced on October 5, 1931. Winners are listed first and highlighted in boldface.

| **Outstanding Production**: **Cimarron – William LeBaron for RKO Pictures**; East Lynne – Winfield Sheehan for Fox Film Corporation; The Front Page – Howard Hughes for United Artists; Skippy – Adolph Zukor for Paramount Pictures; Trader Horn – Irving Thalberg for Metro-Goldwyn-Mayer | **Best Director**: **Norman Taurog – Skippy**; Wesley Ruggles – Cimarron; Clarence Brown – A Free Soul; Lewis Milestone – The Front Page; Josef von Sternberg – Morocco |
| **Best Actor**: **Lionel Barrymore – A Free Soul as Stephen Ashe**; Jackie Cooper – Skippy as Skippy Skinner; Richard Dix – Cimarron as Yancey Cravat; Fredric March – The Royal Family of Broadway as Tony Cavendish; Adolphe Menjou – The Front Page as Walter Burns | **Best Actress**: **Marie Dressler – Min and Bill as Min Divot**; Marlene Dietrich – Morocco as Amy Jolly; Irene Dunne – Cimarron as Sabra Cravat; Ann Harding – Holiday as Linda Seton; Norma Shearer – A Free Soul as Jan Ashe |
| **Best Original Story**: **The Dawn Patrol – John Monk Saunders**; The Doorway to Hell – Rowland Brown; Laughter – Harry d'Abbadie d'Arrast, Douglas Doty, and Donald Ogden Stewart; The Public Enemy – John Bright and Kubec Glasmon; Smart Money – Lucien Hubbard and Joseph Jackson | **Best Adaptation**: **Cimarron – Howard Estabrook, based on the novel by Edna Ferber**; The Criminal Code – Seton I. Miller and Fred Niblo Jr., based on the play by Martin Flavin; Holiday – Horace Jackson, based on the play by Philip Barry; Little Caesar – Francis Edward Faragoh and Robert N. Lee, based on the novel by William R. Burnett; Skippy – Joseph L. Mankiewicz and Sam Mintz, based on the comic strip by Percy Crosby |
| **Best Sound Recording**: **Paramount Publix Studio Sound Department**; MGM Studio Sound Department; RKO Radio Studio Sound Department; Samuel Goldwyn-United Artists Studio Sound Department | **Best Art Direction**: **Cimarron – Max Rée**; Just Imagine – Stephen Goosson and Ralph Hammeras; Morocco – Hans Dreier; Svengali – Anton Grot; Whoopee! – Richard Day |
**Best Cinematography**: **Tabu – Floyd Crosby**; Cimarron – Edward Cronjager; Morocco – Lee Garmes; The Right to Love – Charles Lang; Svengali – Barney McGill

== Multiple nominations and awards ==
Films with multiple nominations
| Nominations | Film |
|---|---|
| 7 | Cimarron |
| 4 | Morocco |
| 4 | Skippy |
| 3 | A Free Soul |
| 3 | The Front Page |
| 2 | Holiday |
| 2 | Svengali |

Films with multiple wins
| Wins | Film |
|---|---|
| 3 | Cimarron |

== Gallery ==
Academy Award-winning and nominated films – 4th Academy Awards
The full film of Cimarron, which won for Best Picture (then known as Outstanding Production), Best Writing (Adaptation), and Best Art Direction

The full film of Min and Bill, which won Marie Dressler the award for Best Actress

The full film of The Dawn Patrol, which won for Best Original Screenplay

== See also ==
- 1930 in film
- 1931 in film
