= Show Them No Mercy! =

1935 film by George Marshall

- Theatrical release poster
- Directed by: George Marshall
- Screenplay by: Kubec Glasmon; Henry Lehrman
- Story by: Kubec Glasmon
- Produced by: Darryl F. Zanuck
- Starring: Rochelle Hudson; Cesar Romero; Bruce Cabot; Edward Norris; Edward Brophy; Warren Hymer
- Cinematography: Bert Glennon
- Edited by: Jack Murray
- Production company: Twentieth Century Pictures
- Distributed by: 20th Century Fox
- Release date: December 6, 1935
- Running time: 76 minutes
- Country: United States
- Language: English

Show Them No Mercy! is a 1935 American crime film directed by George Marshall and written by Kubec Glasmon and Henry Lehrman. The film stars Rochelle Hudson, Cesar Romero, Bruce Cabot, Edward Norris, Edward Brophy and Warren Hymer. The film was released on December 6, 1935, by 20th Century Fox.

== Plot ==
At their home, the Hansen family await news of their kidnapped son, Tom. A ransom demand for $200,000 is delivered by messenger. F.B.I. agents advise the family to pay with marked bills in an attempt to catch the kidnappers. The family are reluctant in fear of what might happen to Tom.

Later, Joe and Loretta Martin, their baby daughter Trudy and dog are driving through a heavy storm when their car gets stuck in mud. The family break into a nearby house to shelter for the night, finding the seemingly abandoned home stocked with new food and clothing. Four kidnappers, Tobey, Pitch, Buzz and Gimp return to the house - their hideout – having collected the ransom money for Tom Hansen and released the boy.

Tobey decides to let the Martins stay at the house for the night so they will leave without trouble, but the Martins quickly realise who the men are, and the gang take them prisoner. The kidnappers decide to test if the ransom money is marked by holding Loretta and Trudy hostage while forcing Joe Martin to go into town with Tobey to spend some of the bills. A drunk and impatient Pitch plans to kill Loretta and Trudy, but he is prevented when Tobey and Joe return from town just in time.

As the gang are packing to leave, they hear a radio broadcast confirming that every bill of the ransom payment is marked. The Martin's dog has picked up some of the marked money and runs away. Frustrated, Pitch shoots and injures the dog. Tobey plans to lie low at the house with the imprisoned Martins, while the rest of the gang go their separate ways.

Pitch and Buzz pay with a marked bill at a gas station, and are reported and chased by police, which ends with Buzz being shot dead and Pitch winged by a bullet. Gimp tries to buy a streetcar ticket but is also spotted by police and killed.

The Martin's injured dog has been taken to a veterinarian by a passing farmer, who has found a marked bill near the dog, allowing the F.B.I. to close in on the hideout. The injured Pitch returns to the house. Pitch promises to help Tobey to get a fake passport, but double crosses and kills him. Pitch breaks into the room where the Martins are being held, meaning to murder them, but Joe fights Pitch and runs, allowing Loretta the chance to grab a gun and shoot Pitch just before he can kill Joe. The police arrive. Joe, Loretta and Trudy are safe, and their dog is given a bravery medal.

== Cast ==
- Rochelle Hudson as Loretta Martin
- Cesar Romero as Tobey
- Bruce Cabot as Pitch
- Edward Norris as Joe Martin
- Edward Brophy as Buzz
- Warren Hymer as Gimp
- Herbert Rawlinson as Kurt Hansen
- Robert Gleckler as Gus Hansen
- Charles C. Wilson as Clifford
- William B. Davidson as Chief Haggerty
- Frank Conroy as Reed
- Edythe Elliott as Mrs. Hansen
- Orrin Burke as Judge Fry

== Title change ==
The film's original title was Snatched and the kidnapping element of the plot was more prominent, but the title and plot emphasis were revised after the Production Code Administration banned detailed depiction of kidnapping in films because of an increase in real-life cases and the fear of glorifying criminals. The New York Times reviewer Andre Sennwald described the film's title change as 'witless' and noted that there was similarity between the plot of Show Them No Mercy and the then recent George Weyerhauser Kidnapping case.
