= Charles Lane (actor, born 1905) =

American actor (1905–2007)

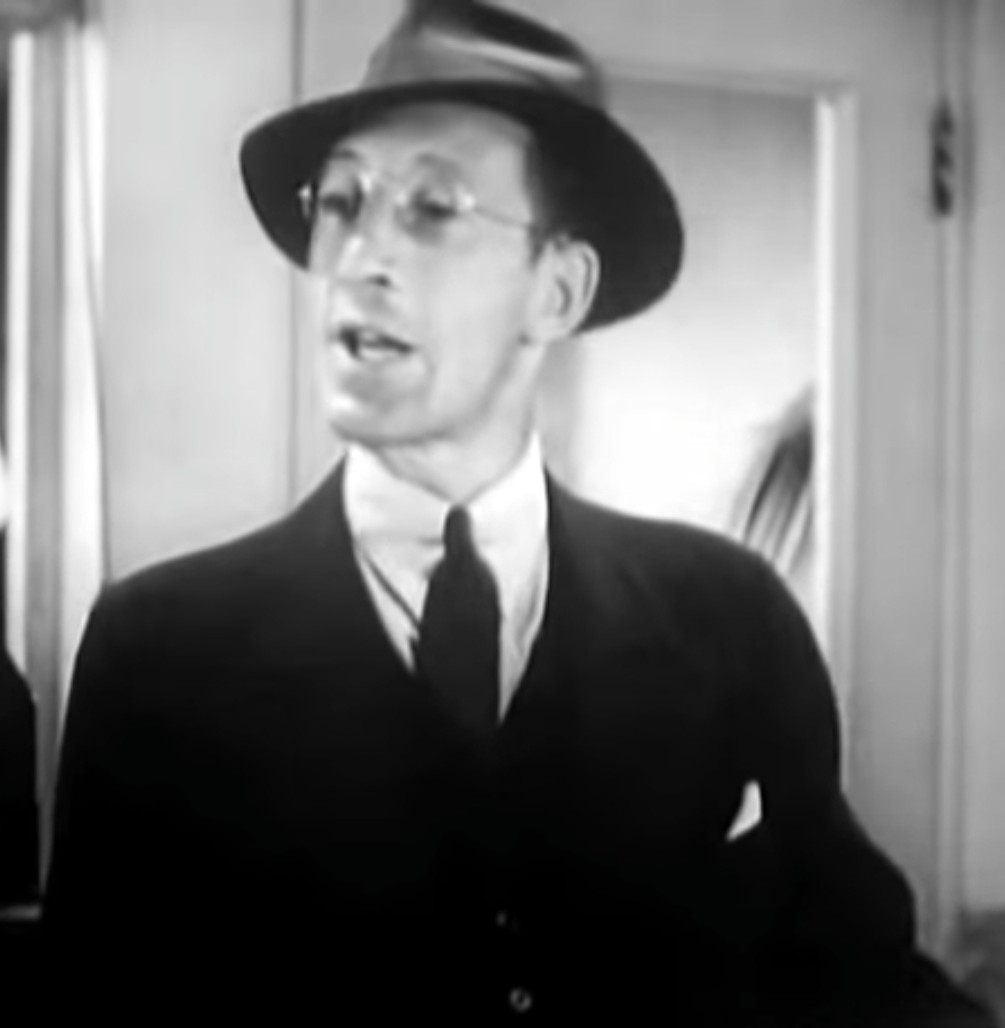
- Lane in Lady Luck (1936)
- Born: Charles Lane; January 26, 1905; San Francisco, California, U.S.
- Died: July 9, 2007 (aged 102); Los Angeles, California, U.S.
- Occupation: Actor
- Years active: 1930–2006
- Spouse: Ruth Covell Lane (m. 1931; died 2002)
- Children: 2

Charles Lane (born January 26, 1905 – July 9, 2007) was an American character actor and centenarian whose career spanned 76 years.

A prolific actor who played hundreds of roles in both film and TV, Lane often played sour, scowling and disagreeable clerks, doctors, judges, and middle-management authority figures. Recalling in 1981 his many roles, he said "They were all good parts, but they were jerks. If you have a type established, though, and you're any good, it can mean considerable work for you." The New York Times reported that Lane's persona was so familiar to the public, "that people would come up to him in the street and greet him, because they thought they knew him from their hometowns." Lane's first film role, of more than 382, was as a hotel clerk in Smart Money (1931) starring Edward G. Robinson and James Cagney. Lane appeared in many Frank Capra films, including Mr. Deeds Goes to Town (1936), You Can't Take It with You (1938), Mr. Smith Goes to Washington (1939), Arsenic and Old Lace (1944), It's a Wonderful Life (1946) and Riding High (1950).

Lane transitioned smoothly into television, and is probably best remembered to TV viewers for his recurring role as the ever-scheming Homer Bedloe on Petticoat Junction. As well, Lucille Ball frequently cast Lane as a no-nonsense authority figure and comedic foe of her scatterbrained TV character on her TV series I Love Lucy, The Lucy–Desi Comedy Hour and The Lucy Show. Lane gave his last performance at the age of 101 as a narrator in 2006.

== Early life ==
Lane was born Charles Gerstle Levison on January 26, 1905, in San Francisco, California, to Jewish parents Alice (née Gerstle) and Jacob B. Levison, an executive at the Fireman's Fund Insurance Company who was instrumental in rebuilding the city after the 1906 earthquake.

Lane served in the U.S. Coast Guard during World War II.

== Career ==
Lane spent a short time as an insurance salesman before taking to the stage at the Pasadena Playhouse. Actor/director Irving Pichel first suggested that Lane go into acting in 1929, and four years later Lane was a founding member of the Screen Actors Guild. He appeared unbilled but always making his presence known in many famous early-1930s Warner Bros. films, beginning with Smart Money then going on to other Pre-Code classics such as Blonde Crazy, Employees' Entrance, Blessed Event, 42nd Street, Gold Diggers of 1933, and She Had to Say Yes, finally getting billing when away from Warners' in My Woman, Looking for Trouble, and Twentieth Century. He became a favorite of director Frank Capra; in It's a Wonderful Life, Capra gave Lane a twist on his usual screen persona by casting him as an apparently hard-nosed rent collector who startles his employer, Mr. Potter (played by Lionel Barrymore) by speaking highly of James Stewart's character. Lane also appeared in the film Mighty Joe Young (1949) as one of the reporters cajoling Max O'Hara (Robert Armstrong) for information about the identity of "Mr. Joseph Young", the persona given featured billing on the front of the building, on opening night.

Among his many roles as a character actor, Lane played Mr. Fosdick in Dear Phoebe, which aired on NBC in 1954–1955. He also portrayed mean-spirited railroad executive Homer Bedloe in the situation comedy Petticoat Junction. He guest starred on such series as ABC's Guestward, Ho!, starring Joanne Dru, and The Bing Crosby Show, as well as the syndicated drama of the American Civil War, The Gray Ghost.

He was a good friend of Lucille Ball, and his specialty in playing scowling, short tempered, no-nonsense professionals provided a comic foil for Ball's scatterbrained television character. He played several guest roles on I Love Lucy, including an appearance in the episode "Lucy Goes To the Hospital", where he is seated in the waiting room with Ricky while Lucy gives birth to their son; he later cited this as one of his favorite parts. He also played the title role in the episode "The Business Manager", the casting director in "Lucy Tells The Truth," and the passport clerk in "Staten Island Ferry." Lane appeared twice in The Lucy–Desi Comedy Hour. He later had recurring roles as shopkeeper Mr. Finch on Dennis the Menace and during the first season (1962–1963) of Ball's The Lucy Show, playing banker Mr. Barnsdahl. According to The Lucy Book by Geoffrey Fidelman, Lane was let go because he had trouble reciting his lines correctly. However, Lane was in reality a placeholder for Ball's original choice, Gale Gordon, who joined the program in 1963 as Mr. Mooney after he was free from other contractual obligations.

In 1963, Lane appeared in the classic comedy It's a Mad, Mad, Mad, Mad World, playing the airport manager. (On the DVD commentary track, historian Michael Schlesinger wryly noted, "You do not have a comedy unless you have Charles Lane in it.") His final acting role was at the age of 101 in 2006's The Night Before Christmas. His last television appearance was at the age of 90, when he appeared in the 1995 Disney TV remake of its 1970 teen comedy The Computer Wore Tennis Shoes, with Kirk Cameron. In 2005, the TV Land Awards paid tribute to Lane by celebrating his 100th birthday. Seated in a wheelchair in the audience, which had sung Happy Birthday to him, Lane was presented with his award by Haley Joel Osment and then announced "If you're interested, I'm still available [for work]!" The audience gave him a standing ovation.

Lane appeared in more than 250 films and hundreds of television shows and was uncredited in many of them. On his busiest days, Lane said he sometimes played more than one role, getting into costume and filming his two or three lines, then hurrying off to another set or studio for a different costume and a different role. As for being typecast, Lane described it as "... a pain in the ass. You did something that was pretty good, and the picture was pretty good. But that pedigreed you into that type of part, which I thought was stupid and unfair, too. It didn't give me a chance, but it made the casting easier for the studio." Lane is recorded as having appeared in sixty-seven parts in a span of just two years, 1940 to 1942.

== Personal life ==
In 1931, Lane married Ruth Covell, and they remained together for 70 years until her death in 2002. They had a son, Charles Jr., and a daughter, Alice.

== Death ==
On January 26, 2007, Lane celebrated his 102nd birthday. He continued to live in the Brentwood home he bought with Ruth (for $46,000 in 1964, equal to $471,382 in 2025 dollars) until his death. In the end, his son, Charles Lane Jr., said he was talking with his father at 9 p.m. on the evening of July 9, 2007, "He was lying in bed with his eyes real wide open. Then he closed his eyes and stopped breathing."

== Filmography ==
=== 1930s ===
- City Girl (1930) as Pedestrian walking in train station (uncredited)
- Smart Money (1931) as Hotel Desk Clerk (uncredited)
- The Road to Singapore (1931) as Desk Clerk at Club (uncredited)
- Blonde Crazy (1931) as Four-Eyes (uncredited)
- Manhattan Parade (1932) as Desk Clerk (uncredited)
- Union Depot (1932) as Luggage Checkroom Clerk (uncredited)
- The Mouthpiece (1932) as Hotel Desk Clerk (uncredited)
- Blessed Event (1932) as Kane (uncredited)
- Employees' Entrance (1933) as Shoe Salesman (uncredited)
- Grand Slam (1933) as Ivan (uncredited)
- Blondie Johnson (1933) as Cashier (uncredited)
- 42nd Street (1933) as Author of 'Pretty Lady' (uncredited)
- Central Airport (1933) as Amarillo Radio Operator (uncredited)
- Gold Diggers of 1933 (1933) as Society Reporter (uncredited)
- Private Detective 62 (1933) as Process Server (uncredited)
- She Had to Say Yes (1933) as Mr. Bernstein (uncredited)
- My Woman (1933) as Conn - Bothersome Agent
- The Bowery (1933) as Doctor (uncredited)
- Broadway Through a Keyhole (1933) as Columnist #2 (replaced by Andrew Tombes) (uncredited)
- Advice to the Lovelorn (1933) as Circulation Manager (uncredited)
- Mr. Skitch (1933) as Hotel Clerk (uncredited)
- The Show-Off (1934) as Mr. Weitzenkorn (uncredited)
- Looking for Trouble (1934) as Switchboard Operator
- Twenty Million Sweethearts (1934) as Reporter (uncredited)
- Twentieth Century (1934) as Max Jacobs aka Max Mandelbaum
- Let's Talk It Over (1934) as Reporter (uncredited)
- I'll Fix It (1934) as Al Nathan
- Broadway Bill (1934) as Morgan's Henchman (uncredited)
- A Wicked Woman (1934) as Defense Attorney Beardsley (uncredited)
- The Band Plays On (1934) as Shyster Lawyer (uncredited)
- One More Spring (1935) as Representative (uncredited)
- Princess O'Hara (1935) as Morris Goldberg (uncredited)
- Ginger (1935) as Judge (uncredited)
- Woman Wanted (1935) as Defense Attorney Herman (uncredited)
- Here Comes the Band (1935) as Mr. Scurry
- Two for Tonight (1935) as Writer
- The Milky Way (1936) as Willard
- It Had Happened (1936) as State Examiner (uncredited)
- Mr. Deeds Goes to Town (1936) as Hallor, crook lawyer (uncredited)
- Neighborhood House (1936) (uncredited)
- Ticket to Paradise (1936) as Shyster (uncredited)
- The Crime of Dr. Forbes (1936) as Defense Attorney
- The Bride Walks Out (1936) as Judge (uncredited)
- 36 Hours to Kill (1936) as Rickert
- Two-Fisted Gentleman (1936) as Joe Gordon
- Lady Luck (1936) as Feinberg
- Easy to Take (1936) as Skip - Reporter
- Come Closer, Folks (1936) as Prosecutor (uncredited)
- Three Men on a Horse (1936) as Cleaner (uncredited)
- Criminal Lawyer (1937) as Nora's Attorney (uncredited)
- We're on the Jury (1937) as Mr. Horace Smith
- Sea Devils (1937) as Judge (uncredited)
- Internes Can't Take Money (1937) as Grote
- Venus Makes Trouble (1937) as District Attorney
- The Jones Family in Big Business (1937) as Webster - Bank Representative (uncredited)
- Born Reckless (1937) as Walden's Lawyer (uncredited)
- One Mile From Heaven (1937) as Webb (uncredited)
- Bad Guy (1937) as Walden's Lawyer (uncredited)
- Fit for a King (1937) as Spears (uncredited)
- Trapped by G-Men (1937) as Fingers
- Hot Water (1937) as Grayson (uncredited)
- Danger – Love at Work (1937) as Gilroy
- Partners in Crime (1937) as Druggist (uncredited)
- Ali Baba Goes to Town (1937) as Doctor
- Nothing Sacred (1937) as Rubenstein (uncredited)
- In Old Chicago (1937) as Booking Agent (scenes deleted)
- City Girl (1938) as Dr. Abbott (uncredited)
- Joy of Living (1938) as Fan in Margaret's Dressing Room (uncredited)
- Cocoanut Grove (1938) as Weaver (uncredited)
- The Rage of Paris (1938) as Department Head (uncredited)
- Professor Beware (1938) as Joe - Photographer (uncredited)
- You Can't Take It with You (1938) as Wilbur G. Henderson
- Three Loves Has Nancy (1938) as Cleaning Store Manager (uncredited)
- Always in Trouble (1938) as Donald Gower
- Blondie (1938) as Furniture Salesman (uncredited)
- Thanks for Everything (1938) as Dr. Olson
- Kentucky (1938) as Auctioneer
- Boy Slaves (1939) as Albee
- Inside Story (1939) as District Attorney
- Let Us Live (1939) as Auto Salesman (uncredited)
- Lucky Night (1939) as Carpenter
- Rose of Washington Square (1939) as Sam Kress, booking agent
- Unexpected Father (1939) as Department of Health Quarantine Man (uncredited)
- Second Fiddle (1939) as Studio Chief (voice, uncredited)
- News Is Made at Night (1939) as District Attorney Rufe Reynolds
- They All Come Out (1939) as Psychiatrist
- Miracles for Sale (1939) as Fleetwood Apartments Desk Clerk (uncredited)
- Fifth Avenue Girl (1939) as Union Representative (uncredited)
- Golden Boy (1939) as Drake - Reporter (uncredited)
- Thunder Afloat (1939) (scenes deleted)
- Honeymoon in Bali (1939) as Photographer for Morrissey's (uncredited)
- Mr. Smith Goes to Washington (1939) as "Nosey", reporter
- Television Spy (1939) as Mr. Adler
- Beware Spooks! (1939) as Mr. Moore, Credit Man (uncredited)
- The Cat and the Canary (1939) as Reporter (uncredited)
- The Honeymoon's Over (1939) as D.W. O'Connor (uncredited)
- Charlie McCarthy, Detective (1939) as Charlie's Doctor (uncredited)

=== 1940s ===
- Parole Fixer (1940) as Florist's Customer (uncredited)
- Johnny Apollo (1940) as Assistant District Attorney
- It's a Date (1940) as Mr. Horner (uncredited)
- Primrose Path (1940) as Mr. 'Smitty' Smith / Hawkins (uncredited)
- Buck Benny Rides Again (1940) as Charlie Graham
- The Doctor Takes a Wife (1940) as Reporter (uncredited)
- I Can't Give You Anything but Love, Baby (1940) as Gannon (uncredited)
- The Crooked Road (1940) as Phil Wesner, Defense Attorney
- Edison, the Man (1940) as Second Lecturer (uncredited)
- Alias the Deacon (1940) as Supervisor (uncredited)
- On Their Own (1940) as Johnson
- You Can't Fool Your Wife (1940) as Salesman (scenes deleted)
- Queen of the Mob (1940) as Horace Grimley
- We Who Are Young (1940) as Perkins
- Rhythm on the River (1940) as Bernard Schwartz
- The Great Profile (1940) as Director
- The Leather Pushers (1940) as Henry 'Mitch' Mitchell
- City for Conquest (1940) as Al - Dance Team Manager (uncredited)
- A Little Bit of Heaven (1940) as Stafford (uncredited)
- Blondie Plays Cupid (1940) as Train Conductor (uncredited)
- Dancing on a Dime (1940) as Freeman Taylor
- Ellery Queen, Master Detective (1940) as Dr. Prouty
- Texas Rangers Ride Again (1940) as Train Passenger (uncredited)
- The Invisible Woman (1940) as Growley
- Back Street (1941) as Blake (uncredited)
- You're the One (1941) as Announcer
- Footlight Fever (1941) as Link - Insurance Agent (uncredited)
- Ellery Queen's Penthouse Mystery (1941) as Doc Prouty
- Repent at Leisure (1941) as Clarence Morgan
- Barnacle Bill (1941) as Auctioneer (uncredited)
- Sis Hopkins (1941) as Rollo
- Blondie in Society (1941) as Washing Machine Salesman (uncredited)
- The Big Store (1941) as Finance Company Agent (uncredited)
- Ellery Queen and the Perfect Crime (1941) as Dr. Prouty
- Sing Another Chorus (1941) as Ryan
- Buy Me That Town (1941) as J. Montague Gainsborough
- Three Girls About Town (1941) as Mortician (uncredited)
- Birth of the Blues (1941) as Wilbur - Theater Manager (uncredited)
- I Wake Up Screaming (1941) as Keating—Florist
- New York Town (1941) as Census Taker (uncredited)
- Appointment for Love (1941) as Smith (uncredited)
- Look Who's Laughing (1941) as Club Secretary (uncredited)
- Ball of Fire (1941) as Larsen
- Sealed Lips (1942) as Attorney Emanuel 'Manny' T. Dixon
- A Gentleman at Heart (1942) as Holloway
- A Close Call for Ellery Queen (1942) as Coroner (uncredited)
- Obliging Young Lady (1942) as Private Detective Smith
- The Lady Is Willing (1942) as K.K. Miller
- Ride 'Em Cowboy (1942) as Martin Manning (uncredited)
- Born to Sing (1942) as Johnny (uncredited)
- What's Cookin'? (1942) as K.D. Reynolds
- The Great Man's Lady (1942) as Pierce (uncredited)
- The Adventures of Martin Eden (1942) as Mr. White, Publisher (uncredited)
- Yokel Boy (1942) as Cynic (uncredited)
- About Face (1942) as Rental Car Manager
- Home in Wyomin' (1942) as Newspaper Editor
- Tarzan's New York Adventure (1942) as Gould Beaton
- Broadway (1942) as Hungry Harry (uncredited)
- Sunday Punch (1942) as Ringside spectator at Ole's first fight (uncredited)
- The Mad Martindales (1942) as Virgil Hickling
- They All Kissed the Bride (1942) as Spotter (uncredited)
- Are Husbands Necessary? (1942) as Mr. Brooks
- Lady in a Jam (1942) as Government Man (uncredited)
- Thru Different Eyes (1942) as Mott
- Friendly Enemies (1942) as Braun
- Pardon My Sarong (1942) as Bus Company Superintendent (uncredited)
- Flying Tigers (1942) as Repkin (uncredited)
- Mission to Moscow (1943) as Man in Kitchen in Montage (uncredited)
- Arsenic and Old Lace (1944) as Reporter
- A Close Call for Boston Blackie (1946) as Hack Hagen (uncredited)
- Just Before Dawn (1946) as Dr. Steiner (uncredited)
- Mysterious Intruder (1946) as Detective Burns
- The Invisible Informer (1946) as Nick Steele
- The Show Off (1946) as Quiz Master (uncredited)
- Swell Guy (1946) as Ben Tilwell (uncredited)
- It's a Wonderful Life (1946) as Potter's Rent Collector
- The Farmer's Daughter (1947) as Jackson - Campaign Reporter
- It Happened on Fifth Avenue (1947) as Landlord (uncredited)
- Living in a Big Way (1947) as Hawkins (uncredited)
- Bury Me Dead (1947) as Mr. Brighton (uncredited)
- Louisiana (1947) as McCormack
- Roses Are Red (1947) as Lipton
- Intrigue (1947) as Hotel Desk Clerk
- Call Northside 777 (1948) as Prosecuting Attorney (uncredited)
- State of the Union (1948) as Blink Moran
- Smart Woman (1948) as Reporter (uncredited)
- Race Street (1948) as Switchboard Operator-Clerk (uncredited)
- The Gentleman from Nowhere (1948) as Fenmore
- Out of the Storm (1948) as Mr. Evans
- Apartment for Peggy (1948) as Prof. Collins (uncredited)
- Moonrise (1948) as Mr. Chandler - Man in Black
- The Boy with Green Hair (1948) as Passerby (uncredited)
- Mother Is a Freshman (1949) as Mr. De Haven (uncredited)
- You're My Everything (1949) as Mr. Eddie Pflum (uncredited)
- Mighty Joe Young (1949) as Producer (uncredited)
- The House Across the Street (1949) as Apartment Manager (uncredited)
- Miss Grant Takes Richmond (1949) as Mr. Woodruff (uncredited)

=== 1950s ===
- Backfire (1950) as Dr. Nolan (uncredited)
- Borderline (1950) as Peterson—U.S. Customs Man (uncredited)
- The Yellow Cab Man (1950) as L.A. Casualty Co. Executive (uncredited)
- Riding High (1950) as Erickson
- Love That Brute (1950) as Joe Evans - Cigar Store Owner (uncredited)
- The Second Face (1950) as Mr. West - Insurance Claims Adjustor
- The Du Pont Story (1950) as Lammot du Pont
- For Heavens Sake (1950) as Arthur Crane (IRS) (uncredited)
- I Can Get It for You Wholesale (1951) as Herman Pulvermacher (uncredited)
- Criminal Lawyer (1951) as Frederick Waterman (uncredited)
- Here Comes the Groom (1951) as FBI Agent Ralph Burchard (uncredited)
- The Sniper (1952) as Drunk in Bar (uncredited)
- Three for Bedroom "C" (1952) as Trainman (uncredited)
- Burns & Allen TV Series (Jan 1, 1953) as Mr. Fitzpatrick
- I Love Lucy (TV series)
  - (1953: Lucy Goes to the Hospital)
  - (1953: Lucy Tells the Truth)
  - (1954: The Business Manager)
  - (1956: Staten Island Ferry)
- The Juggler (1953) as Rosenberg
- Remains to Be Seen (1953) as Delapp (examiner)
- The Affairs of Dobie Gillis (1953) as Chemistry Professor Obispo
- Francis Joins the WACS (1954) (uncredited)
- Dear Phoebe (1954, TV series)
- Willy (1954–1955) in episode "First Case" (1954)
- Kiss Me Deadly (1955) as Doctor (uncredited)
- The Birds and the Bees (1956) as Charlie Jenkins - Bartender
- Top Secret Affair (1957) as Bill Hadley
- God Is My Partner (1957) as Judge Warner
- The People's Choice (1957) as Manager
- The Real McCoys (1957–1958) (ABC-TV, two episodes) as Harry Poulson
- Teacher's Pet (1958) as Roy
- The Restless Gun (1958) as Mayor Pete Mercer in Episode "The Suffragette"
- Perry Mason in the Fiery Fingers (1958) as Dr. Williams
- Richard Diamond, Private Detective in "One Foot in the Grave" (CBS-TV, 1958) as Kevin Anders
- The Mating Game (1959) as Inspector General Bigelow
- The 30 Foot Bride of Candy Rock (1959) as Stanford Bates
- But Not for Me (1959) as Al Atwood
- Dennis The Menace (1959–1963) TV series as Mr. Finch

=== 1960s ===
- The Tab Hunter Show (1960–1961) — Dr. Spike in "Personal Appearance" (1961)
- Pete and Gladys (1960–1962) — Mr. Vincent in "The House Next Door" (1961) and Slater in "Garden Wedding" (1962)
- The DuPont Show with June Allyson with June Allyson as Elsa Wilson, in "The Old-Fashioned Way" (1961) as Dr. Shelley
- The Lucy Show (1962) as Mr. Barnstahl
- Mister Ed - "Wilbur in the Lion's Den" (1962)
- The Music Man (1962) as Constable Locke
- Mr. Smith Goes to Washington TV series (1963) as Caleb
- It's a Mad, Mad, Mad, Mad World (1963) as Airport Manager
- Papa's Delicate Condition (1963) as Mr. Cosgrove
- The Wheeler Dealers (1963) as Judge (uncredited)
- Petticoat Junction — (1963–1968) (24 episodes) as Homer Bedloe
- The Beverly Hillbillies (1963–1971) as Foster Phinney / Homer Bedloe / Billy Hacker
- Bewitched (1964–1972, TV series) as Mr. Roland / Mr. Cushman / Harold Jameson / Mr. Harmon / Mr. Meikeljohn / Shotwell / Jessie Mortimer / Ed Hotchkiss
- The Andy Griffith Show in episode "Aunt Bee the Crusader" (1964) as Mr. Frisby
- Gomer Pyle, U.S.M.C. in episode 106 "Pay Day" (1964) as General Richards
- The Carpetbaggers (1964) as Denby
- The New Interns (1964) as Connors
- Good Neighbor Sam (1964) as Jack Bailey
- Looking for Love (1964) as Screen Test Director
- The Cara Williams Show in episode "Variety is the Spice of Wife" (1965) as McAvie
- Get Smart in "My Nephew the Spy" (1965) as Uncle Abner
- Kentucky Jones in "The Big Speech" (1965) as Doc Axby
- John Goldfarb, Please Come Home (1965) as 'Strife' Magazine Editor
- Billie (1965) as Coach Jones
- The Donna Reed Show in "The Big League Shock" (1965) as Mr. Sampson
- The Munsters in "The Most Beautiful Ghoul in the World" (1966) as Mr. Edgar Z. Holmes
- The Ghost and Mr. Chicken (1966) as Lawyer Whitlow
- The Ugly Dachshund (1966) as Judge
- The Pruitts of Southampton (1966–1967, TV series) as Maxwell
- F Troop (1966) as Mr. S. A. MacGuire
- He and She (1967) as Mr. Julius Simpson, US Immigration officer
- Eight on the Lam (1967) as Bank Examiner (uncredited)
- The Gnome-Mobile (1967) as Dr. Scoggins
- Wild Wild West S3 E7 "The Night of the Hangman" as the scheming Roger Creed (1967)
- What's So Bad About Feeling Good? (1968) as Dr. Shapiro
- Did You Hear the One About the Traveling Saleslady? (1968) as Mr. Duckworth
- Green Acres in episode "The Rummage Sale" (1968) as Mr Wilson
- My Dog, the Thief (1969) as Mr. Pfeiffer

=== 1970s ===
- The Aristocats (1970) as Georges Hautecourt (voice)
- Nanny and the Professor (1970–1971, TV series) as Ticket Seller / Driving Inspector
- Hitched (1971) as Round Tree
- The Great Man's Whiskers (1972) as Philbrick
- Get to Know Your Rabbit (1972) as Mr. Beeman
- The Odd Couple in "Take my Furniture, Please" (1973) as Sid
- Karen TV series (1975) as Dale Busch
- Sybil (1976) as Dr. Quinoness
- Family (1976) as James Lawrence / Thursday's Child
- Movie Movie (1978) as Judge / Mr. Pennington
- Soap (1977–1978, TV series) as Judge Petrillo
- The Little Dragons (1979) as J.J.

=== 1980s ===
- Return of the Beverly Hillbillies (1981) as Chief
- Strange Behavior (1981) as Donovan
- Little House on the Prairie episode "Welcome to Olsenville" (1982) as Jess Moffet
- The Winds of War (mini) series (1983) as Adm. William Standley
- Strange Invaders (1983) as Professor Hollister
- Sunset Limousine (1983) as Reinhammer
- Murphy's Romance (1985) as Amos Abbott
- When the Bough Breaks (1986) as Van der Graaf
- Vanishing America (1986) as Shopkeeper
- Date with an Angel (1987) as Father O'Shea
- St. Elsewhere episode "Weigh In, Way Out" (1987) as Mr. Welte
- War and Remembrance (mini) series (1988) as Adm. William Standley

=== 1990s ===
- Dark Shadows (1991, episode #6) as Antique Dealer
- Acting on Impulse (1993) as Bellhop
- The Computer Wore Tennis Shoes (1995) as Regent Yarborough

=== 2000s ===
- The Night Before Christmas (2006) (holiday short) as Narrator (voice)
