= Kubec Glasmon =

American pharmacist and screenwriter

- Born: August 12, 1897; Raciąż, Vistula Land
- Died: March 13, 1938 (aged 40); Los Angeles, California, US
- Occupation: Screenwriter
- Years active: 1931–42 (last work released after his death)

Kubec Glasmon (August 12, 1897 – March 13, 1938) was an American screenwriter from Vistula Land, who was nominated for the now defunct category of Best Story at the 4th Academy Awards. He was nominated for Best Story with John Bright for The Public Enemy. The film was based on the duo's then-unpublished novel Beer and Blood, which was published after the film's release (as The Public Enemy) by Grosset & Dunlap in 1931.

== Filmography ==
- Smart Money (1931)
- The Public Enemy (1931)
- Blonde Crazy (1931)
- Union Depot (1932)
- Three on a Match (1932)
- Taxi! (1932)
- Rockabye (1932)
- False Faces (1932)
- The Crowd Roars (1932)
- Handy Andy (1934)
- Bolero (1934)
- Jealousy (1934)
- Woman Wanted (1935)
- Show Them No Mercy! (1935)
- Men Without Names (1935)
- The Glass Key (1935)
- Parole! (1936)
- This Is My Affair (1937)
- The Man in Blue (1937)
- Saleslady (1938)
- Calling Dr. Gillespie (1942)

== Personal life ==
Kubec was a former pharmacist in Chicago before he became a screenwriter. He wrote crime stories with John Bright. He was married to film actress Joan Blair, born Lilian Wilck.

He died at age 40 of a heart attack.
