= Three on a Match =

1932 film by Mervyn LeRoy

- Theatrical release poster
- Directed by: Mervyn LeRoy
- Screenplay by: Lucien Hubbard
- Story by: Kubec Glasmon; John Bright
- Produced by: Samuel Bischoff; Darryl F. Zanuck; Raymond Griffith
- Starring: Joan Blondell; Warren William; Ann Dvorak; Bette Davis
- Cinematography: Sol Polito
- Edited by: Ray Curtiss
- Music by: Leo F. Forbstein; Ray Heindorf
- Production company: First National Pictures
- Distributed by: Warner Bros. Pictures
- Release date: October 29, 1932 (US)
- Running time: 63 minutes
- Country: United States
- Language: English

Three on a Match is a 1932 American pre-Code crime drama film released by Warner Bros. Pictures. It was directed by Mervyn LeRoy and stars Joan Blondell, Warren William, Ann Dvorak, and Bette Davis. The film also features Lyle Talbot, Humphrey Bogart, Allen Jenkins, and Edward Arnold.

== Plot ==
Three women who went to the same New York City elementary school (P.S. 62), Mary, Ruth, and Vivian, meet again ten years later. They each light a cigarette from the same match and discuss the superstition that such an act is unlucky, and will lead to Vivian, the last to light her cigarette, being the first to die.

Mary is a showgirl who has established stability in her life after spending some time in a reform school, while Ruth works as a stenographer. Vivian is the best-off of the three, married to a prominent lawyer, Robert Kirkwood, and with a young son, Robert Jr., but she has grown dissatisfied with her life, and decides to take a trip to Europe.

Shortly before Vivian and Junior are about to set sail, Mary boards the ocean liner with two men to attend a bon voyage party for some friends. Gambler Michael Loftus, one of the two men, flirts with Vivian, and ends up persuading her to run away with him. Minutes before the ship leaves port, Vivian gets Junior and her luggage and disembarks.

Vivian and Michael live a very shabby and rather dissolute life, causing Mary concern about Vivian's neglect of Junior. Mary tells Robert, nearly mad over the disappearance of the boy, where to find him. Both Mary and Ruth are very fond of Junior, and Robert falls in love with Mary. He proposes to her, and hires Ruth to be Junior's governess. Mary and Robert marry the same day his divorce from Vivian becomes final.

By the next year, Vivian has become a hopeless drug addict and spent all of her money. Additionally, Michael owes $2,000 to gangster Ace, who tells him to pay up—or else. Michael tries to blackmail Robert by threatening to inform the press about Mary's criminal background, but Robert refuses to pay because he is already aware of Mary's checkered past. Desperate, Michael kidnaps Junior, intending to pay his debt with the ransom money. Ace learns of Michael's plan, however, and sends his thugs to take over and up the ransom demand to $25,000.

The search for Junior is intense, and the police dragnet closes in on Vivian and Michael's apartment. Harve, Ace's chief henchman, does not pick up the ransom money when he notices several officers near the drop point. There is no further progress, so, on the tenth day, the decision is made to abandon the plan. Michael is ordered to kill Junior so the boy cannot identify the kidnappers, but Michael refuses, and one of the gangsters knocks him out when his protestations become hysterical.

Meanwhile, Vivian, who is suffering from drug withdrawals, has overheard the plot to kill Junior, and is determined to save his life at all costs. She tells Junior to hide under the bed, then uses lipstick to scrawl a message giving the boy's whereabouts on her nightgown. Just as the gangsters come through the door, she jumps out of the fourth-floor window, drawing attention and resulting in Junior's rescue. At home after all is resolved, Mary and Ruth light their cigarettes from the same match and then throw it down onto the hearthstone, where the flame goes out.

== Cast ==
- Joan Blondell as Mary Keaton (stage name Mary Bernard), a showgirl
  - Virginia Davis as Mary Keaton as a child
- Ann Dvorak as Vivian Revere Kirkwood, a wealthy housewife and mother
  - Anne Shirley (credited as Dawn O'Day) as Vivian Revere as a child
- Bette Davis as Ruth Westcott, a stenographer
  - Betty Carse as Ruth Westcott as a child
- Warren William as Robert Kirkwood, a prominent lawyer married to Vivian
- Lyle Talbot as Michael Loftus, an acquaintance of Mary who runs off with Vivian
- Humphrey Bogart as Harve, Ace's chief henchman
- Allen Jenkins as Dick, one of Ace's henchmen
- Edward Arnold as Ace, a gangster

Uncredited

- Sidney Miller as Willie Goldberg, a student
- Frankie Darro as Bobby, a student
- Blanche Friderici as Miss Blazer, the girls' teacher
- Herman Bing as Professor Irving Finklestein, the school music teacher
- Grant Mitchell as Mr. Gilmore, the school principal
- Clara Blandick as Mrs. Keaton, Mary's mother
- Glenda Farrell as the blonde inmate in reform school
- Buster Phelps as Robert Kirkwood Jr., Vivian and Robert's young son
- Hardie Albright as Phil, who works for Robert
- Harry Seymour as Jerry Carter, an acquaintance of Mary and Michael
- John Marston as Randall, who leads Robert's initial search for Vivian and Robert Jr.
- Jack La Rue as one of Ace's henchman
- Stanley Price as one of Ace's henchman

Principal cast members (from the trailer)

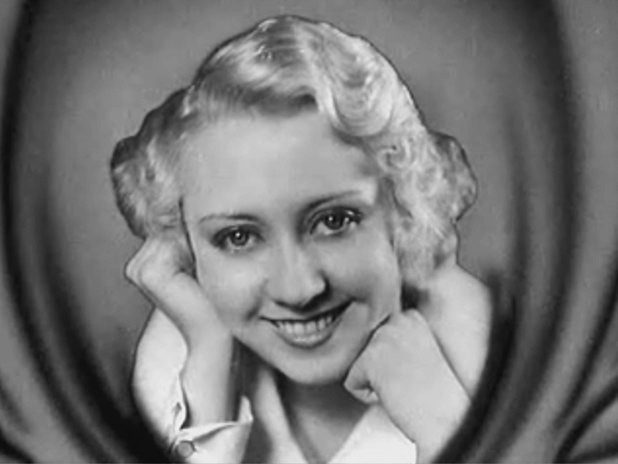
Joan Blondell

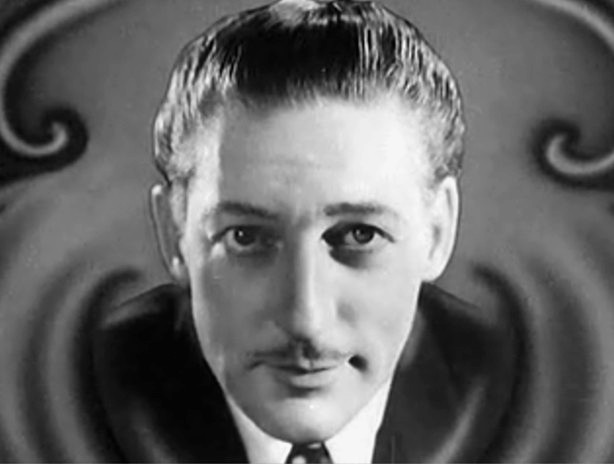
Warren William

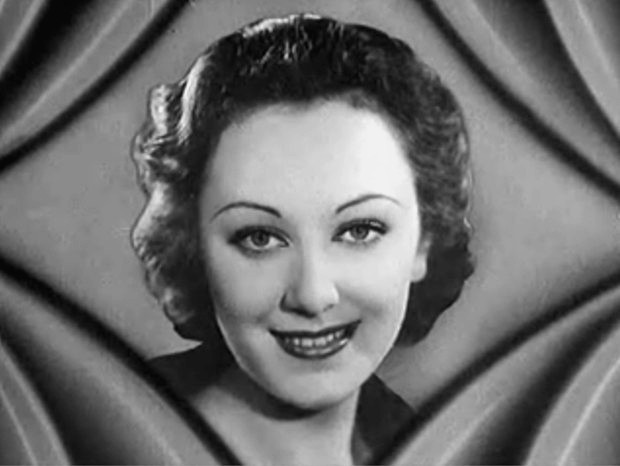
Ann Dvorak

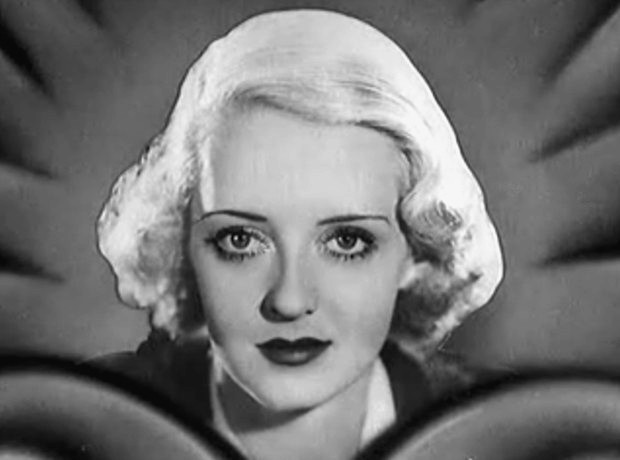
Bette Davis

== Production ==
Dvorak was the last of the four principal actors to be cast. This was Bogart's first appearance as a hoodlum type, although his work in Midnight (released in 1934) preceded this role, and led to his being cast by director LeRoy.

Filming took place in June 1932.

When Three on a Match was released in October 1932, the Lindbergh kidnapping was very much in the news, and the kidnappers had not yet been caught. The kidnapping of a child in the story raised concerns with censors, but Jason Joy of the Studio Relations Committee (Note: The arm of the Motion Picture Producers and Distributors of America tasked with implementing the Hays Code) successfully made a case for the film to the censors in New York, Ohio, Pennsylvania, and Maryland.

== Promotion ==
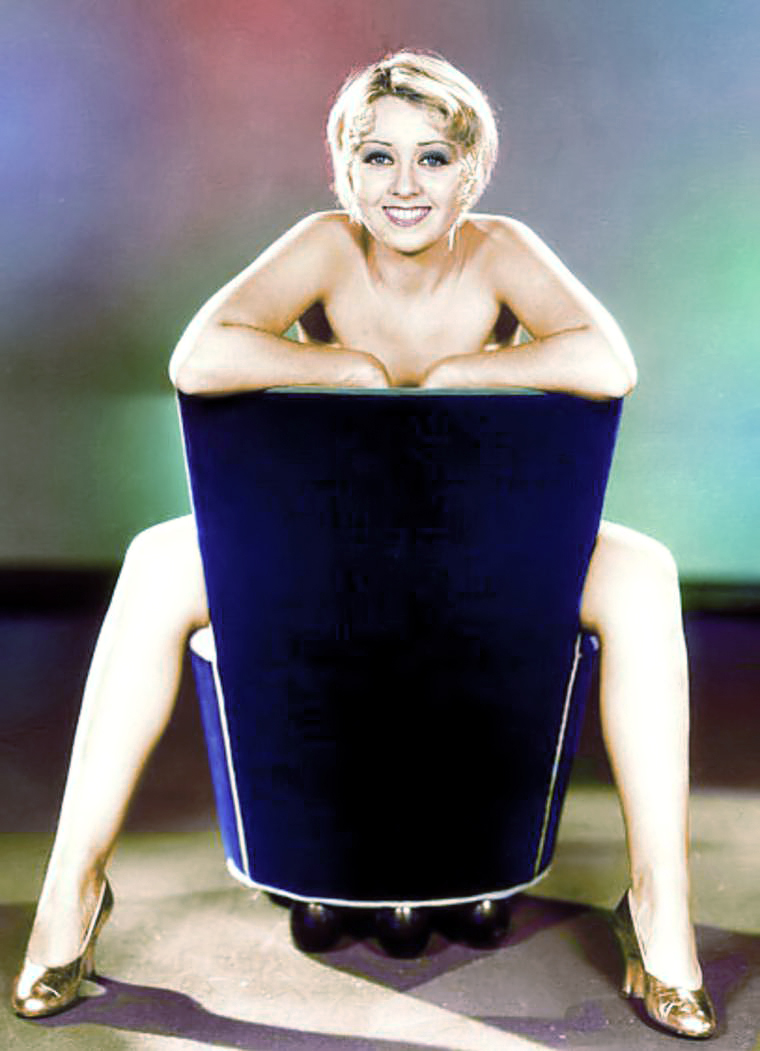
Joan Blondell in a banned 1932 promotional publicity photo for the film

Joan Blondell posed for a risqué promotional publicity photo for the film, which was later banned under the Motion Picture Production Code.

== Reception ==
Three on a Match received tepid to poor notices overall. Mordaunt Hall of the New York Times called it "tedious and distasteful", as well as "unintelligent". The Time reviewer felt it did not carry much weight, unlike previous Glasmon–Bright productions, (Note: e.g., The Public Enemy (1931)) and that the suicide at the end was more implausible than tragic. Kaspar Monahan of the Pittsburgh Press felt the film began with the hope of being "different", but ultimately devolved into a "gangster yarn", and summarized: "Direction good for the most part; acting as good as can be expected under the circumstances; story erratic."

The Spokane Spokesman-Review expressed admiration for the way the passage of time is shown through several montage sequences, calling it "a brand new approach and treatment", and commented that the film "rang true".

Trade paper reviews advised exhibitors to focus on the cast. Variety's Sid Silverman commented: "An attractive cast array is the attendance motive for this picture which is surprising in its meager demands upon its quartet of featured people." The Film Daily review, too, said the "cast helps" with a plot that has "too many turns". The Motion Picture Herald also advised exhibitors to focus on the "strength of the cast names", and not to even use the word "kidnaping" or allude to it in promotions.

Decades after its release, the film found more favor with critics and film historians. In 1969, William K. Everson called it "unusually carefully-made", and wrote: "Splendidly cut and paced ... and climaxed by a real shocker, Three on a Match is still a vivid little picture". Wheeler Winston Dixon observed: "the film is astonishing for the amount of information that LeRoy manages to compress into this lightning-fast tale". It has been pointed to as Dvorak's best performance for Warners.

Leonard Maltin gave the film three out of four stars, describing it as a "Fine, fast-moving (and surprisingly potent) pre-Code melodrama of three girls who renew childhood friendship, only to find suspense and tragedy. Dvorak is simply marvelous."

On the review aggregator website Rotten Tomatoes, 83% of 6 critics' reviews of Three on a Match are positive.

== Remake ==
In 1938, Warner Bros. released Broadway Musketeers, a remake of Three on a Match.
