= Mia Marvin =

American actress

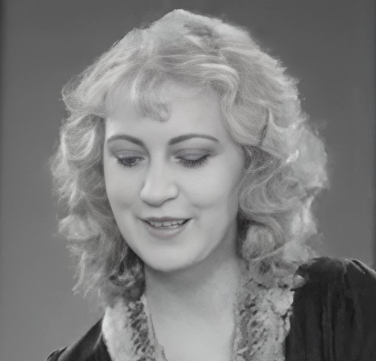
Mia Marvin

Mia Marvin (November 1, 1904 – September 27, 1992) was an American actress best known for her role in The Public Enemy as the woman who houses and rapes James Cagney. In her film career spanning five years she appeared in three films and never in a credited role.

Marvin was the daughter of William Thatcher Marvin and granddaughter of Col. E. J. C. Kewen, California's first attorney general. When she was nine years old, an article in the Los Angeles Sunday Times recognized her for having written two songs and taught herself to play the violin.

Before she became an actress, Marvin was a danseuse. Her work on stage included acting in No, No, Nanette (1925), Ladies All (1931), and Elmer the Great (1931) in San Francisco and So This Is London (1927) in Los Angeles.

Marvin was married to Maurice G. Luxford.

== Filmography ==
Year	Title	Role	Notes
1931	The Public Enemy	Jane	Uncredited
1932	You Said a Mouthful	Armstrong's Secretary	Uncredited
1935	The Call of the Wild	Stage Heroine	Uncredited, (final film role)
