= Taxi! =

1932 film

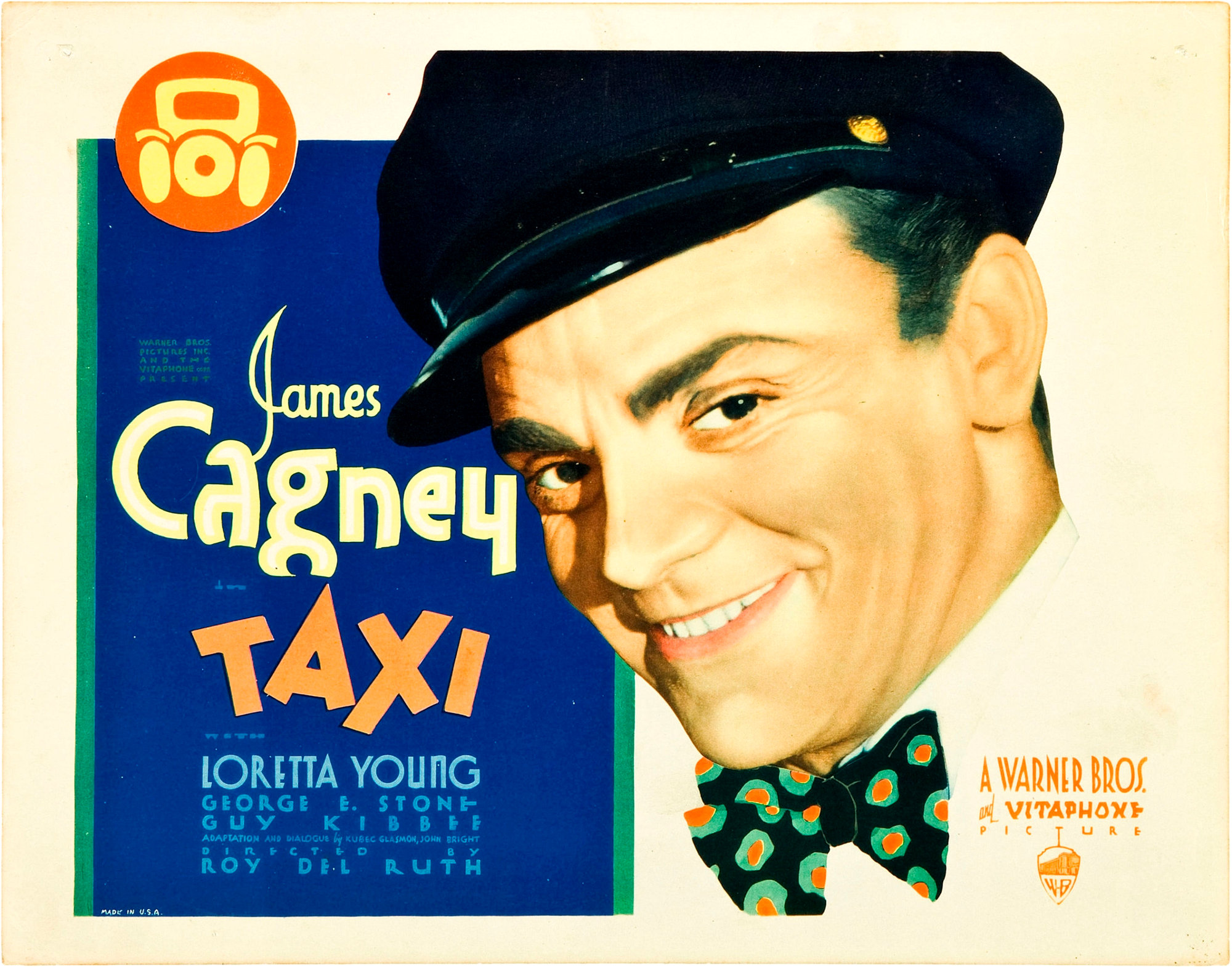
- Lobby card
- Directed by: Roy Del Ruth
- Written by: Adaptation & dialogue: Kubec Glasmon; John Bright
- Based on: The Blind Spot unproduced play by Kenyon Nicholson
- Produced by: Robert Lord
- Starring: James Cagney; Loretta Young
- Cinematography: James Van Trees
- Edited by: James Gibbon
- Production company: Warner Bros. Pictures
- Distributed by: Warner Bros. Pictures
- Release date: January 23, 1932
- Running time: 69 minutes
- Country: United States
- Language: English

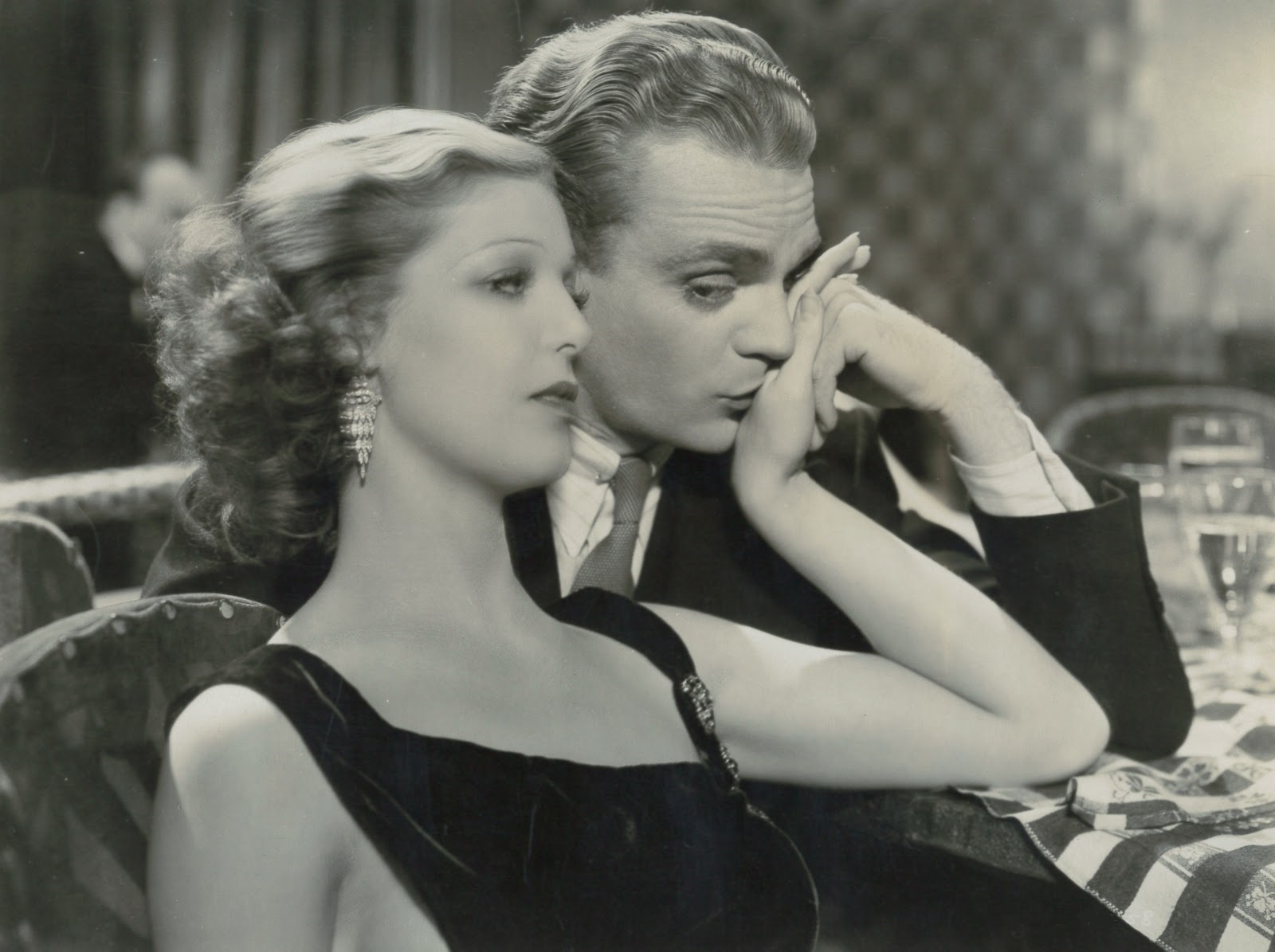
Loretta Young and James Cagney

Taxi! is a 1932 American pre-Code crime drama film directed by Roy Del Ruth and starring James Cagney and Loretta Young.

The film includes a famous, and often misquoted, line with Cagney speaking to his brother's killer through a locked closet door: "Come out and take it, you dirty yellow-bellied rat, or I'll give it to you through the door!" This line has often been misquoted as "You dirty rat, you killed my brother".

== Plot ==
When veteran cab driver Pop Riley of the Independent Cab Company refuses to surrender his prime location outside a cafe where his daughter works, his taxicab is wrecked by a henchman from the rival Consolidated Cab Company, which is trying to dominate the taxi industry. When he sees that his cab has been destroyed, Pop shoots and kills the man. He is sentenced to prison, where he soon dies of poor health.

Pop's waitress daughter Sue is asked by scrappy young cab driver Matt to lend moral support to a resistance movement of cab drivers who are also experiencing similar intimidation at the hands of Consolidated. Matt delivers an impassioned speech to his fellow drivers urging them to take action, but then Sue enrages Matt with her speech imploring the men to resist violence.

Matt later has a change of heart and develops romantic intentions for Sue. They begin dating and compete in a foxtrot dance contest. Matt and Sue are married, and on their wedding night they visit a nightclub with Matt's brother Dan, where they are taunted by Buck Gerard, the man from Consolidated who is responsible for the attacks on the cab drivers. A fistfight ensues and Buck stabs and kills Dan with a switchblade.

Matt refuses to inform the police who killed Dan in order that he might exact revenge himself. Sue warns Buck's girlfriend Marie that Matt is pursuing him. When Matt finds Buck, Sue and Marie keep him away from Buck long enough for the police to arrive. Matt fires a gun at the closet in which Buck is hiding, but Buck has fallen to his death from the closet window while trying to escape.

Just as Sue is about to leave Matt, they reconcile.

== Cast ==
- James Cagney as Matt Nolan
- Loretta Young as Sue Riley Nolan
- George E. Stone as Skeets
- Guy Kibbee as Pop Riley
- Leila Bennett as Ruby
- Dorothy Burgess as Marie Costa
- David Landau as Buck Gerard
- Ray Cooke as Danny Nolan
- Berton Churchill as Judge West (uncredited)
- George Raft as William Kenney, dance contestant (uncredited)

== Production ==
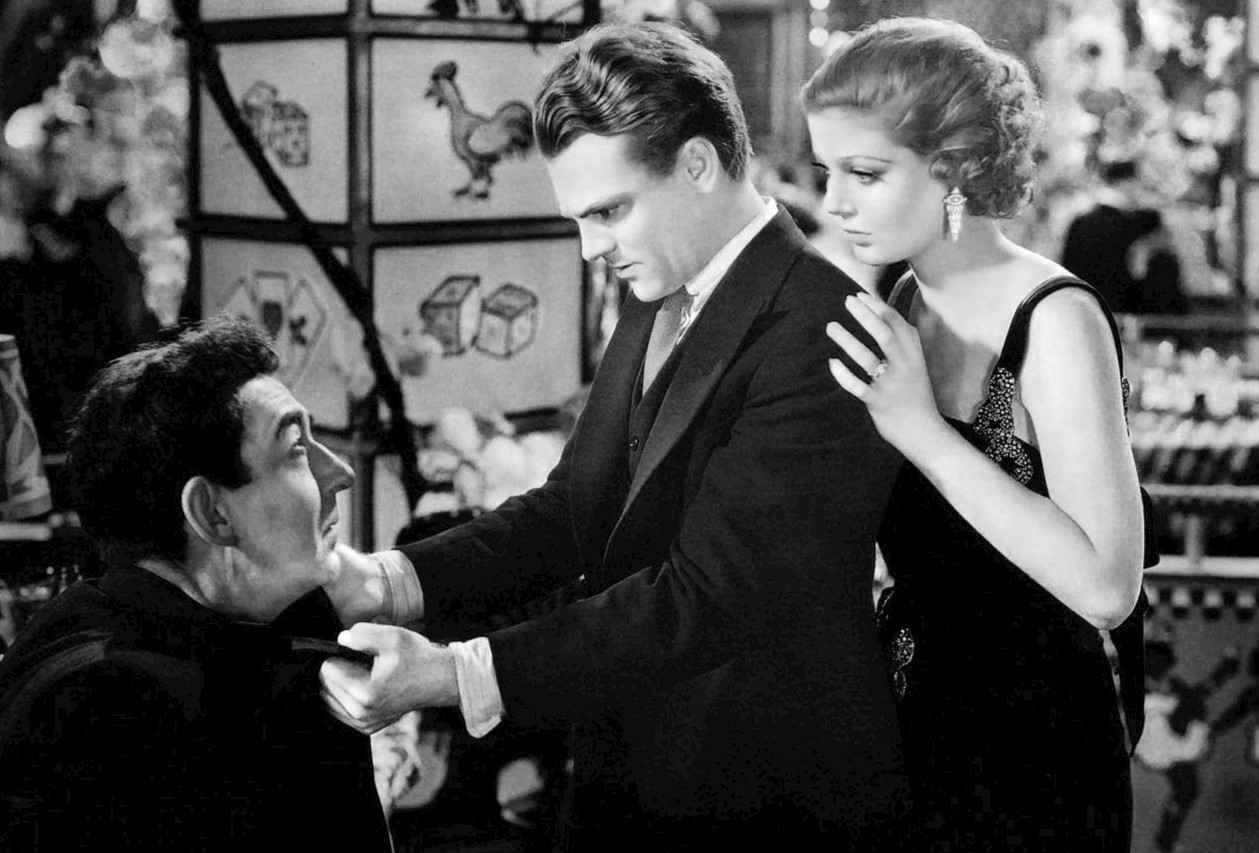
David Landau, James Cagney, and Loretta Young in Taxi! (1932)

To play his competitor in a ballroom dance contest, Cagney recommended his friend George Raft, who was uncredited in the film.

As in The Public Enemy (1931), several scenes in Taxi! involved the use of live machine-gun bullets. After a few of the bullets narrowly missed Cagney's head, he refused to employ real bullets in his subsequent films.

In the film, the characters view a fictitious Warner Bros. film at the cinema titled Her Hour of Love, during which Cagney cracks a joke about the film's leading man, who is played by Donald Cook (in an uncredited role), Cagney's brother in The Public Enemy. In the cinema lobby, there is a poster for The Mad Genius, an actual Warner Bros. film starring John Barrymore that had been released during the previous year.

== Reception ==
In a contemporary review for The New York Times, critic Mordaunt Hall wrote: "This story, such as it is, moves along rapidly with good enough dialogue for the persons involved. It is at times quite ingenious ... Mr. Cagney misses no chance to make his characterization tell."

== Home media ==
Taxi! was released on DVD by Warner Bros. through its manufacture-on-demand Warner Archive label in February 2012.
