= Union Depot (film) =

1932 film

- Title card
- Directed by: Alfred E. Green
- Written by: Dialogue: Kubec Glasmon; John Bright
- Screenplay by: Kenyon Nicholson; Walter DeLeon
- Based on: Union Depot; 1929 play by Joe Laurie Jr. Gene Fowler; Douglas Durkin
- Starring: Douglas Fairbanks, Jr.; Joan Blondell
- Cinematography: Sol Polito
- Edited by: Jack Killifer
- Music by: Leo F. Forbstein
- Production company: First National Pictures
- Distributed by: Warner Bros. Pictures
- Release dates: January 14, 1932 (NYC); January 30, 1932 (US)
- Running time: 65 minutes
- Language: English
- Budget: $284,000
- Box office: $637,000 (Note: According to Warner Bros records, the film earned $488,000 domestically and $149,000 foreign.)

Union Depot is a 1932 American pre-Code melodrama film directed by Alfred E. Green for Warner Bros., starring Douglas Fairbanks Jr. and Joan Blondell, and based on an unpublished play by Joe Laurie Jr., Gene Fowler, and Douglas Durkin. The film, an ensemble piece for the studio's contract players, also features performances by Guy Kibbee, Alan Hale, Frank McHugh, David Landau, and George Rosener. In the United Kingdom it was released under the title Gentleman for a Day. The film's copyright was registered in 1932 and renewed in 1959. It will enter the American public domain on January 1, 2028. (Note: Under R235205)

== Plot ==
Charles "Chic" Miller is a hobo released from jail for vagrancy, along with fellow drifter "Scrap Iron" Scratch. The two men walk to the local railroad station to hop a train out of town. Through a series of chance encounters at Union Depot, Chic becomes, in his words, a "gentleman for a day".

At the depot Chic finds in a public washroom a suitcase left by a drunk passenger. In the suitcase are toiletries and a nice double-breasted man's suit with cash in one pocket. After changing into the suit, Chic uses the money to buy a much-needed meal at the depot's diner. Soon he meets Ruth Collins sitting on a bench in the terminal. She tells him she is an out-of-work chorus girl and is desperate to raise $64 for train fare to Salt Lake City, where a job is waiting for her. Initially, he thinks she is a prostitute, although he begins to believe her after she shows him a telegram with her job offer. She then confides to him that she is worried about a "madman" following her, a Dr. Bernardi, who resides in the same boarding house she recently left. She adds that the strange doctor has "bad eyes" and once paid her to read to him in the evenings. Now feeling sorry for Ruth, Chic tells her he will give her the money she needs "with no strings attached".

Back inside the depot, a crook named "Bushy" Sloan is impersonating a German musician and is carrying a violin case full of counterfeit money. Bushy checks the case into the station's temporary storage for baggage, but a pickpocket soon steals his wallet, which contains the baggage-claim ticket. The pickpocket discards the wallet in an alleyway after removing its cash. While waiting for Chic outside the depot, Scrap Iron finds the wallet with the ticket. Later he gives the ticket to Chic, who reclaims the violin case. Initially, Chic plans to pawn the case until he opens it and is stunned to see it is full of money, not realizing it is counterfeit. He hides the case and most of the bogus cash in a small coal bin near the depot, and he instructs Scrap Iron to guard it while he leaves to ponder what to do. Chic sees Ruth again and gives her some of the counterfeit cash to buy new clothes at a shop in the station. She too is unaware that the money is not genuine.

While Chic is away, Dr. Bernardi sends Ruth a passenger ticket and a message to meet him in the train's designated compartment. Believing the ticket is from Chic, Ruth goes there and begins screaming when she sees Bernardi. Chic has returned to the dress shop to discover from the saleslady about the ticket Ruth was sent. He rushes to the train, but the counterfeiter tries to stop him. He boards the rail car, hears Ruth screaming and breaks through the train car's locked door, but Bernardi escapes. As he runs across an adjacent railroad track, he is struck by a passing train and killed. Meanwhile, the dress shop clerk who sold clothes to Ruth becomes suspicious of the cash she used and takes it to the station master. Both Ruth and Chic are then taken into custody by government agents searching for criminals exchanging phony money. Unfortunately, the investigators have no description of Bushy, but they believe Ruth might be his associate. To clear her, Chic goes with one of the agents to retrieve the hidden violin case. The men are followed by Bushy, who shoots the agent and flees with the case. Chic chases and catches the crook. All is reconciled and Ruth has a bittersweet parting from Chic as she boards the train to Utah. The film ends with Chic and Scrap Iron walking together along a railroad track, away from Union Depot and back to their lives as hobos.

== Cast ==
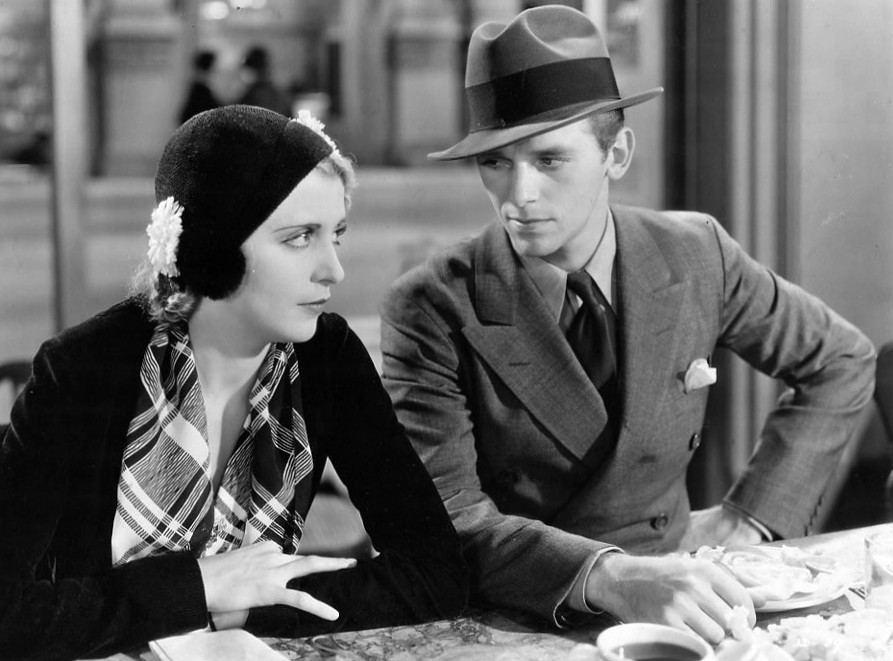
Douglas Fairbanks Jr. and Mary Doran

- Douglas Fairbanks Jr. as Charles "Chic" Miller
- Joan Blondell as Ruth Collins
- Guy Kibbee as "Scrap Iron" Scratch
- Alan Hale as "The Baron", Bushy Sloan
- David Landau as Kendall, government agent
- George Rosener as Dr. Bernardi
- Earle Foxe as Detective Jim Parker
- Frank McHugh as The Drunk
- Adrienne Dore as Sadie

Uncredited:

- Mary Doran as Daisy
- George MacFarlane as train caller
- George Chandler as panhandler who asks for a dollar
- Irving Bacon as waiter in private room
- Charles Lane as baggage handler
- Charles Coleman as Rev. Harvey Pike

== Production ==
Production on Union Depot began in mid-October 1931.

The high cost of constructing the large, elaborate train-station set for Union Depot proved in the long run to be worthwhile for Warner Bros., which had purchased First National Pictures several years prior to the production of Union Depot. An article on the Turner Classic Movies site notes "...the film did leave one legacy at the studio. The impressive train station set built for this picture would resurface in Warners' films for years to come, helping keep production costs down in the time-honored Warner Bros. fashion."

Because Union Depot was produced prior to the rigid enforcement of the Motion Picture Production Code, the film's storyline contains many topics that would have, by the latter half of 1934, jeopardized the certificate of approval needed for a production's release in the United States. Some of these forbidden topics in Union Depot include the following:

- Ruth reads what is implied to be very lewd or "off-color" stories to Dr. Bernardi.
- Though Chic stops short of taking advantage of Ruth's plight, she makes it clear that she has "been around" and is willing to do whatever is necessary for the price of a train ticket. Despite this, she emerges unscathed, which ran counter to one of the Hays Code's requirements that "sympathy of the audience should never be thrown to the side of the crime, wrongdoing, evil or sin".
- Chic, who demonstrates that he is a thief, liar and someone quite willing to purchase sexual services, is ultimately neither held accountable for his actions nor "punished" in any way by the end of Union Depot; in fact, he emerges as the film's hero.

== Critical reception ==
The film had its New York City premiere at the Winter Garden Theater on January 14, 1932. The New York Times movie critic, Mordaunt Hall, characterized Union Depot as an "ingenious, rather than artistic" melodrama recalling the contemporary Broadway play Grand Hotel, which was later adapted for the screen. He noted that some of the dialogue was at times unnecessarily "raw" and that Fairbanks appeared to have "taken a leaf from James Cagney's book, judging by his talk and the way he slaps a girl's face". He also questioned the realism of a hobo speaking with Fairbanks' excellent elocution.

The entertainment trade publication Variety complimented the performances of Blondell and Fairbanks in what it described as a "bing-bing, action melodrama". Variety also praised the "capital bit of technique" employed in the series of brief scenes at the beginning of the film to establish the plot's tongue-in-cheek attitude toward human behavior.
