= The Crowd Roars (1932 film) =

1932 American film

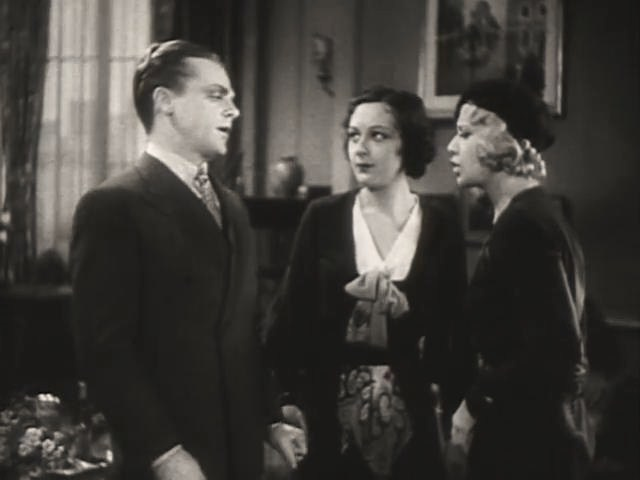
- James Cagney, Ann Dvorak and Joan Blondell
- Directed by: Howard Hawks
- Screenplay by: John Bright; Niven Busch; Kubec Glasmon; Seton I. Miller
- Story by: Howard Hawks
- Starring: James Cagney; Joan Blondell
- Cinematography: Sidney Hickox; John Stumar
- Edited by: Thomas Pratt
- Music by: Bernhard Kaun
- Distributed by: Warner Bros. Pictures
- Release date: April 16, 1932 (U.S.)
- Running time: 85 minutes
- Country: United States
- Language: English
- Budget: $265,000
- Box office: $769,000

The Crowd Roars is a 1932 American pre-Code drama film directed by Howard Hawks starring James Cagney and featuring Joan Blondell, Ann Dvorak, Eric Linden, Guy Kibbee, and Frank McHugh. A film of the same name was made in 1938 with a different story, starring Robert Taylor.

The driver in the film's auto racing sequences was Harry Hartz, a successful board track and Indianapolis 500 race professional. It was remade in 1939 as Indianapolis Speedway with Pat O'Brien in Cagney's role, Ann Sheridan in Blondell's role, and McHugh reprising his role.

== Plot ==
Motor racing champion Joe Greer returns home to compete in an exhibition race featuring his younger brother Eddie, who has aspirations of becoming a champion. Joe's obsession with "protecting" Eddie from women causes Joe to interfere with Eddie's relationship with Anne, leading to estrangement between Joe and Eddie, and between Joe and his longtime girlfriend Lee, who is made to feel "not good enough" to be around Eddie.

During the race, a third driver, Spud Connors, wrecks and dies from immolation. Driving lap after lap through the flames while blaming himself for the accident, Joe loses his will to race. Eddie goes on to win. Afterward, Joe's career plummets as Eddie's rises. The power of love eventually triumphs, and Joe's career and his relationships with Eddie and Lee are rehabilitated.

== Cast ==
- James Cagney as Joe Greer
- Joan Blondell as Anne Scott
- Ann Dvorak as Lee Merrick
- Eric Linden as Edward "Eddie" Greer
- Guy Kibbee as Pop Greer
- Frank McHugh as "Spud" Connors
- Billy Arnold as Himself
- Fred Frame as Himself
- Harry Hartz (uncredited) as Himself
- Ralph Hepburn as Himself
- Wilbur Shaw as Himself
- Shorty Cantlon as Himself
- Mel Kenealy as Himself
- Stubby Stubblefield as Himself
- Spider Matlock (uncredited) as Himself

== Production ==
The Crowd Roars is loosely based on the play The Barker: A Play of Carnival Life by Kenyon Nicholson. Hawks developed the script with Seton Miller for their eighth and final collaboration and the script was by Miller, Kubec Glasmon, John Bright and Niven Busch. Blondell and Dvorak initially were cast in each other's roles but swapped after a few days of shooting. Shooting began on December 7, 1931, at Legion Ascot Speedway and wrapped on February 1, 1932. Hawks used real race car drivers in the film, including the 1930 Indianapolis 500 winner, Billy Arnold.

Certain scenes were filmed at the now defunct Nutley Velodrome racetrack in Nutley, New Jersey, with Harry Hartz standing in for James Cagney. In original prints of the film, the big racing scene at the end was printed on tinted "Inferno" stock. A French-language version, La foule hurle, starring Jean Gabin, was produced in 1932. Warner Bros. remade The Crowd Roars in 1939 as Indianapolis Speedway.

== Box office ==
According to Warner Bros records, the film earned $524,000 domestically and $245,000 foreign.
