= John Bright (screenwriter) =

American screenwriter

- Born: January 1, 1908; Baltimore, Maryland, U.S.
- Died: September 14, 1989 (aged 81)
- Occupations: Screenwriter, journalist, activist
- Years active: 1931–1950s
- Spouse: Josefina Fierro

John Milton Bright (January 1, 1908 – September 14, 1989) was an American journalist, screenwriter and political activist.

Bright was born in Baltimore and worked with Ben Hecht as a newspaper journalist in Chicago. With fellow journalist Kubec Glasmon, Bright co-wrote a series of stories adapted as screenplays. The most notable of these, Beer and Blood, became the 1931 film The Public Enemy starring James Cagney. The two were nominated for a 1931 Academy Award for Best Story.

In 1933 he became one of the ten founders of the Screen Writers Guild. As with other founders and members of the Screen Writers Guild, Bright was targeted in the early 1950s by the House Un-American Activities Committee, and put on the Hollywood blacklist.

Bright's wife Josefina Fierro was a Mexican-American activist in her own right. Bright fled to Mexico and wrote screenplays for at least two Mexican films.

His posthumous 2002 memoir was called Worms in the Winecup.

== Films ==
Bright's credits as a screenwriter, often collaborating with others, include:

- Smart Money (1931)
- The Public Enemy (1931)
- Blonde Crazy (1931)
- The Crowd Roars (1932)
- Three on a Match (1932)
- Taxi! (1932)
- If I Had a Million (1932)
- She Done Him Wrong (1933)
- San Quentin (1937)
- Sherlock Holmes and the Voice of Terror (1942)
- The Brave Bulls (1951)

== Personal life ==
Bright's stepson, Kendall "Kenny" Bright (née Kohler) (1925–1981) was a photographer and jazz trumpeter and in the Los Angeles and Las Vegas scenes, playing with Art Farmer, Wardell Gray, Paul Horn, and John Pisano. He was also the composer of the jazz standard "Bright Boy" found in the Real Book. He was later murdered July 24, 1981 while working as a cab driver in a robbery attempt.
