= Blonde Crazy =

1931 film

- Theatrical poster
- Directed by: Roy Del Ruth
- Written by: Kubec Glasmon; John Bright
- Starring: James Cagney; Joan Blondell
- Cinematography: Sidney Hickox
- Edited by: Ralph Dawson
- Music by: Leo F. Forbstein
- Distributed by: Warner Bros. Pictures, Inc.
- Release date: December 3, 1931
- Running time: 79 minutes
- Country: United States
- Language: English

Blonde Crazy is a 1931 American pre-Code romantic comedy-drama film directed by Roy Del Ruth and starring James Cagney, Joan Blondell, Noel Francis, Louis Calhern, Ray Milland, and Guy Kibbee. The film is notable for one of Cagney's lines, a phrase often repeated by celebrity impersonators: "That dirty, double-crossin' rat!"

== Plot ==
Bert Harris works for a hotel as a bellboy. One day, he meets Anne Roberts, who signs up as a chambermaid. He takes a fancy to her and lets her in on his racket, conning people out of money. They arrange for married hotel guest A. Rupert Johnson Jr. to be caught in a compromising position with Anne and get $5000 to keep a (fake) policeman from taking him to jail. From there, they leave town and embark on ever grander crooked schemes.

Having moved to a larger city, the pair fall in with Dapper Dan and Helen, fellow con artists. Dan gets Bert to front him money for a counterfeit money purchase, but Dan and Helen abscond with his money and leave a note taunting Bert. To recoup the funds so he doesn't have to tell Anne, he scams a jewelry store out of a diamond necklace. When Anne finds out what happened, she finds Dapper Dan and pretends to join him in a horse racing scam, but instead scams Dan out of his money.

Anne falls in love with Bert, but he does not realize it until it is too late. By the time he proposes to her, she has transferred her affections to the respectable Joe Reynolds and marries him. The exterior shot of the marriage takes place at the newly opened St. Monica Catholic Church, located in Santa Monica, California. Bert travels around Europe for a year. When he returns to the United States, he is no longer interested in crime.

However, Anne tracks him down and asks him for $30,000. It turns out that Joe has embezzled that amount from his employer. Bert does not have that much, but he comes up with a plan. He gets Joe to give him the keys to the office and the combination of the company safe. He will break into the safe and steal what is left. Everyone will assume that he also took the $30,000 in negotiable bonds. However, Joe double crosses him; he has the police waiting. Bert manages to speed away in his car, but is shot and captured. When Anne comes to see him in his cell, she informs him that she found out what Joe did. At which point, Bert says, "That dirty, double-crossin' rat!". Bert persuades her not to reveal everything to the police, telling her it would not help him anyway. She vows to be waiting for him after he serves his sentence, cheering him up.

== Cast ==
- James Cagney as Bert Harris
- Joan Blondell as Anne Roberts
- Louis Calhern as Dapper Dan Barker
- Noel Francis as Helen
- Ray Milland as Joe Reynolds
- Guy Kibbee as A. Rupert Johnson Jr.
- Polly Walters as Peggy
- William Burress as Col. Bellock
- Maude Eburne as Mrs Snyder
- Nat Pendleton as Hank/Pete
- Charles Lane as Four-Eyes (uncredited)

== Reception ==
Mordaunt Hall, critic for The New York Times, wrote that "Unedifying though the incidents are and feeble as is the attempt at a moral, the greater part of James Cagney's new picture, 'Blonde Crazy,' ... is lively and cleverly acted."

Time felt the ending was out of place with the rest of the film and was only inserted there to provide a moralistic "law and order" ending.

Cagney's line "That dirty, double-crossin' rat!" was nominated for the American Film Institute 2005 AFI's 100 Years...100 Movie Quotes

== Preservation status ==
- A copy is in the collection of The Library of Congress.

== Home media ==
In 2014, Blonde Crazy was released on DVD in a Forbidden Hollywood box set. The cover features a publicity photo of Cagney and Blondell in a risque, pre-Code bathtub scene.
