= Smart Money (1931 film) =

1931 film

- Lobby card
- Directed by: Alfred E. Green
- Written by: Screen story and dialogue: Kubec Glasmon; John Bright; Lucien Hubbard; Joseph Jackson
- Produced by: Alfred E. Green (uncredited)
- Starring: Edward G. Robinson; James Cagney; Evalyn Knapp; Margaret Livingston; Noel Francis; Boris Karloff
- Cinematography: Robert Kurrle
- Edited by: Jack Killifer
- Music by: Leo F. Forbstein
- Production company: Warner Bros. Pictures
- Distributed by: Warner Bros. Pictures
- Release date: July 11, 1931
- Running time: 81 minutes
- Country: United States
- Language: English

Smart Money is a 1931 American pre-Code drama film produced and distributed by Warner Bros. Pictures, directed by Alfred E. Green, and starring Edward G. Robinson and James Cagney. It is the only occasion Robinson and Cagney appeared in a film together, despite being the two leading actors, mainly portraying gangsters, at Warner Bros. studios throughout the 1930s. Smart Money was shot after Robinson's signature film Little Caesar had been released and during the filming of Cagney's breakthrough performance in The Public Enemy, which is how Cagney came to play a supporting role.

The supporting cast includes Evalyn Knapp, Margaret Livingston (the "Woman from the City" in F. W. Murnau's 1927 Sunrise: A Song of Two Humans), and an unbilled but prominently featured Boris Karloff, who portrayed the monster in Frankenstein later the same year.

The writing team of Lucien Hubbard and Joseph Jackson were nominated at the 4th Academy Awards in the now defunct Best Story category.

== Plot ==
Nick Venizelos, a prosperous small-town barber, provides his customers with gambling in his back room. He is so lucky that one suggests he go to the big city to take on famous gambler named Hickory Short. Not lacking in self-confidence, Nick puts up half of the $10,000 stake himself, while the others raise the rest. He leaves the shop under the supervision of his assistant, Jack, and takes the train into the city.

He learns from Marie, the pretty blonde working at the hotel cigar stand, where Hickory is holding his illegal, high-stakes poker game. Nick sits down at the game, but loses all his money. Later, however, he sees a newspaper article reporting that the real Hickory Short has just been released from prison far away in Florida. The man he thought was Hickory is actually conman Sleepy Sam, and Marie is his girlfriend and accomplice. When Nick foolishly tries to get his money back, Sleepy Sam and the other fake poker players beat him up. After he gets out of the hospital, he vows to get revenge.

Nick goes back to barbering and raises another stake. Six months later, he tracks down Sleepy Sam and his gang in another city. He proposes a one-on-one game, each man putting up $50,000 and playing until one man has all the money. Sam accepts. Nick insists on sending out for fresh decks of cards, just to be safe. When Nick wins and tries to leave, the con artists reach for their guns, but Jack and another man burst in with their guns already drawn. Nick then gloats, pointing out that he simply cheated better than Sam by using shaved cards.

Nick becomes very successful. He finally gets to play the real Hickory Short; a Walter Winchell column reports the rumor that Nick beat Hickory to the tune of $300,000. Nick becomes the king of illegal gambling in the city, with Jack as his right-hand man.

However, he still has a weakness for women, particularly blondes. As they are driving by, they are stopped and asked to take a young woman who has been fished half drowned out of the river to the hospital. Irene revives during the ride, but Nick insists she stay at his mansion until she is fully recovered, over the very suspicious Jack's protests. Eventually, she is so touched by Nick's kindness, she confesses she is fleeing from a charge of blackmail, but he is unconcerned.

Nick is so brazen that public outrage puts pressure on District Attorney Black, who is up for re-election soon. He has Irene picked up. Black threatens to prosecute her unless she cooperates in incriminating Nick, but she refuses at first. Finally, he gets her to agree to put a racing form in Nick's coat, which will be enough to put Nick in jail for a month. Jack finds out, but when he tries to warn his friend, Nick becomes furious and knocks him to the floor. The police raid the illegal casino, and Black arrests Nick. Then they discover that Jack is dead. Aghast, Irene begs Nick for forgiveness, which he generously gives. He is sentenced to ten years. As he is boarding the train to go to prison, he offers to bet that he will be out in five.

== Cast ==
- Edward G. Robinson as Nick "The Barber" Venizelos
- James Cagney as Jack
- Evalyn Knapp as Irene Graham
- Ralf Harolde as Sleepy Sam
- Noel Francis as Marie
- Margaret Livingston as District Attorney's girlfriend
- Maurice Black as Greek Barber
- Billy House as Irontown Salesman-Gambler
- Paul Porcasi as Alexander Amenoppopolus
- Polly Walters as Lola
- Boris Karloff as Sport Williams (uncredited)
- Charles Lane as Hotel Clerk (uncredited)
- John Larkin as Snake Eyes (uncredited)
- Morgan Wallace as District Attorney Black (uncredited)

== Home media ==
Smart Money was released on DVD by Warner Home Video in 2008, and featured an audio commentary by Alain Silver & James Ursini.
