= CYS =

CYS or Cys may refer to:

- Cysteine, an amino acid abbreviated Cys
- Cheyenne Regional Airport, Wyoming, United States, IATA and FAA LID airport code
- Cathays railway station, Cardiff, Wales, station code
- California Youth Symphony, a San Francisco Bay Area symphony orchestra for young musicians
- Cyprus Organization for Standardization, the Cyprus national standardization body
- Cys Kurland, footballer who played for the South African national side in 1947

== See also ==
- Cys-la-Commune, a French commune
