= Kurland =

Kurland may refer to:

== People ==
- Abraham Kurland (1912-1999), Danish Olympic medalist in wrestling
- Ben Kurland, American actor
- Bob Kurland, American basketball center
- Charles Kurland, American and Swedish biochemist
- Cys Kurland, South African footballer
- Gilbert Kurland, American sound engineer and production manager
- Justine Kurland, American fine art photographer
- Lynn Kurland, American author
- Michael Kurland, American author
- Peter Kurland, American motion picture sound mixer
- Sheldon Kurland, American violinist and musical arranger

== Places ==
- Courland (German: Kurland), a region of Latvia
- Curland, a village and civil parish in Somerset, England
- Duchy of Courland and Semigallia, a former duchy in the Baltic region
- Kurland, Norway, village in Akershus, Norway

== See also ==
- Courland (disambiguation)
