= Bride of Frankenstein =

1935 film by James Whale

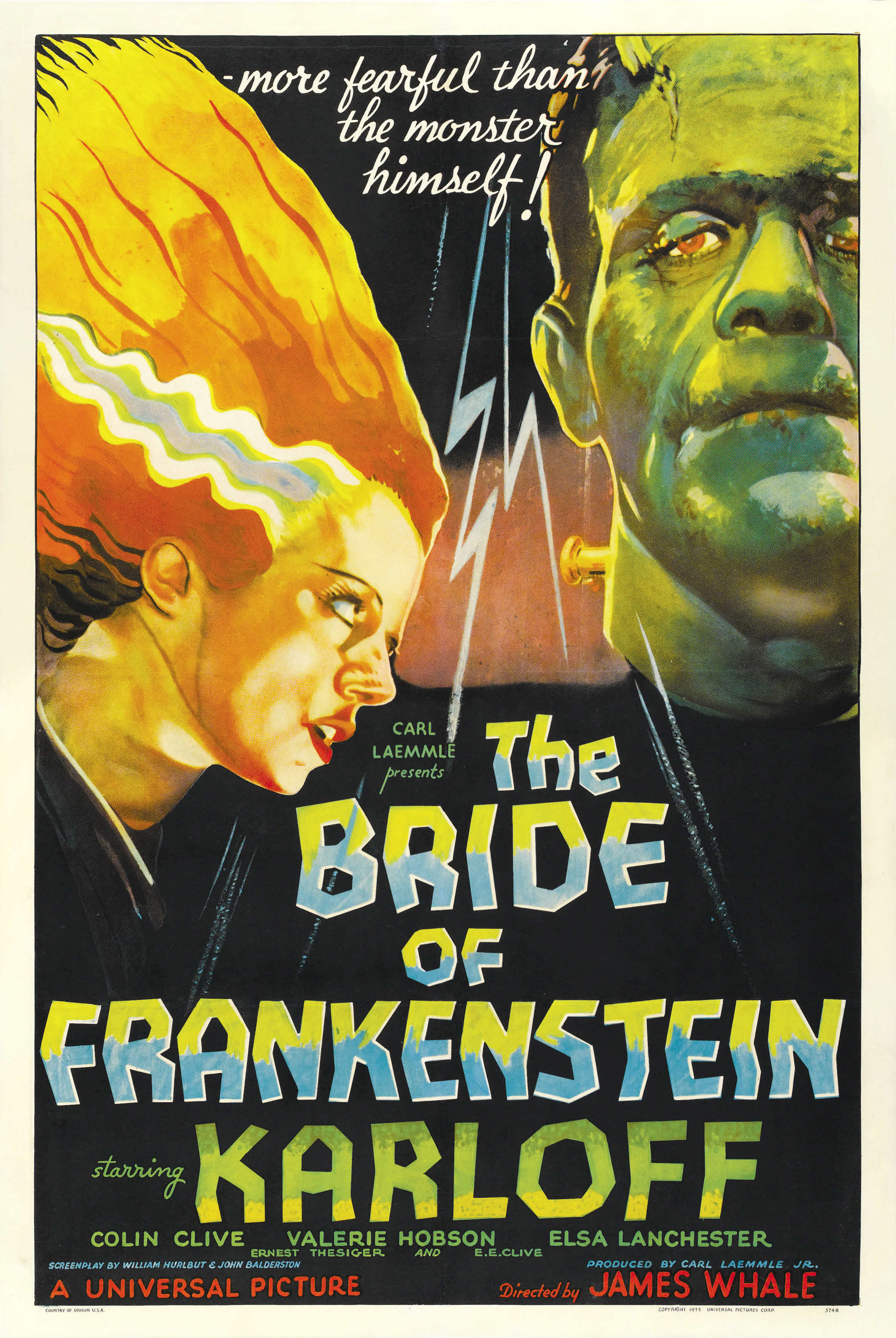
- Theatrical release poster
- Directed by: James Whale
- Screenplay by: William Hurlbut
- Story by: William Hurlbut; John L. Balderston
- Based on: Frankenstein; or, The Modern Prometheus; 1818 novel by Mary Shelley
- Produced by: Carl Laemmle Jr.
- Starring: Boris Karloff; Colin Clive; Valerie Hobson; Elsa Lanchester; Ernest Thesiger; E. E. Clive
- Cinematography: John J. Mescall
- Edited by: Ted J. Kent
- Music by: Franz Waxman
- Production company: Universal Pictures
- Distributed by: Universal Pictures
- Release dates: April 19, 1935 (San Francisco); April 20, 1935 (United States)
- Running time: 75 minutes
- Country: United States
- Language: English
- Budget: $397,000
- Box office: $2 million

Bride of Frankenstein is a 1935 American horror film as well as the first sequel to Universal Pictures' 1931 film Frankenstein. As with the first film, Bride was directed by James Whale, starring Boris Karloff as the Monster and Colin Clive as Dr. Frankenstein. Additionally, it features Elsa Lanchester in the dual role of Mary Shelley and the bride, and Ernest Thesiger as Doctor Septimus Pretorius with Valerie Hobson replacing Mae Clarke as Elizabeth Frankenstein.

Taking place immediately after the events of the earlier film, it is rooted in a subplot of the original Mary Shelley novel, Frankenstein; or, The Modern Prometheus (1818). Bride follows a chastened Henry Frankenstein as he attempts to abandon his plans to create life, only to be tempted and finally blackmailed by his old mentor Dr. Pretorius, along with threats from the Monster, into constructing a bride for the Monster.

Preparation to film a sequel to Frankenstein began shortly after its premiere, but script problems delayed the project. Principal photography on Bride of Frankenstein finally commenced in January 1935, with creative personnel from the original returning both in front of and behind the camera. The film was released to critical and popular acclaim, although it encountered difficulties with some state and national censorship boards.

Since its release Bride of Frankenstein's reputation has grown, and it is now frequently considered one of the greatest sequels ever made. Many critics consider it to be an improvement on the original, and have hailed it as Whale's masterpiece. In 1998, it was selected by the Library of Congress for preservation in the National Film Registry, having been deemed "culturally, historically or aesthetically significant".

== Plot ==
In a castle on a stormy night, Percy Bysshe Shelley and Lord Byron praise Mary Shelley for her story of Frankenstein and his Monster. She reminds them that her intention for writing the novel was to impart a moral lesson, the consequences of a mortal man who tries to play God, then says she has more of the story to tell.

Following the events of Frankenstein (1931), villagers gather around the burning windmill to cheer the apparent death of the Monster. Hans, the father of the girl the Monster drowned, wants to see the Monster's bones. He falls into a flooded pit underneath the mill, where the Monster—having survived the fire—strangles him. Hauling himself from the pit, the Monster also casts Hans' wife to her death. He next encounters Frankenstein's servant Minnie, who flees in terror.

The body of Henry Frankenstein, who is thought to have died at the windmill, is returned to his fiancée Elizabeth at his castle home. Minnie arrives to sound the alarm about the Monster, but her warning goes unheeded. Elizabeth, seeing Henry move, realizes he is still alive. Nursed back to health by Elizabeth, Henry renounces his creation, but still believes he may be destined to unlock the secret of life and immortality. A hysterical Elizabeth cries that she foresees death.

Henry visits the lab of his former mentor Doctor Septimus Pretorius, where Pretorius shows Henry several homunculi he has created. Pretorius wishes to work with Henry to create a mate for the Monster, with the proposed venture involving Pretorius growing an artificial brain while Henry gathers parts for the mate.

Meanwhile, the Monster saves a young shepherdess from drowning. Her screams upon seeing the Monster alert two hunters, who shoot and injure him. They raise a mob that sets out in pursuit. Captured and trussed to a pole, the Monster is hauled to a dungeon and chained. Left alone, he breaks his chains, overpowers the guards, and escapes into the woods. That night, the Monster encounters an old blind hermit who thanks God for sending him a friend. He teaches the Monster words like "friend" and "good" and shares a meal with him. Two lost hunters stumble upon the cottage and recognize the Monster. He attacks them and accidentally burns down the cottage as the hunters lead the hermit away.

Taking refuge from another angry mob in a crypt, the Monster spies Pretorius and his cronies Karl and Ludwig breaking open a grave. The henchmen depart as Pretorius has supper. The Monster reveals himself, eats some of the food, and learns that Pretorius plans to create a mate for him.

Henry and Elizabeth, now married, are visited by Pretorius. Henry expresses his refusal to assist Pretorius, who calls the Monster. The Monster demands Henry's help, to no avail. Pretorius orders the Monster out, secretly signaling him to kidnap Elizabeth. Pretorius guarantees her safe return upon Henry's participation. Henry returns to his tower laboratory and, despite himself, grows excited over his work. After being assured of Elizabeth's safety, Henry completes the Bride's body.

A storm rages as final preparations are made to bring the Bride to life. Her bandage-wrapped body is raised through the roof, where electricity is harnessed from lightning to animate her. Henry and Pretorius lower her and, after realizing their success in bringing her to life, remove her bandages and help her to stand.

The Monster comes down the steps after killing Karl on the rooftop and sees the Bride. The Monster reaches out to her and asks, "Friend?" The Bride, screaming, rejects him. He observes, "She hate me! Like others." As Elizabeth races to Henry's side, the Monster rampages through the lab. Before destroying everything, the Monster pauses and tells Henry and Elizabeth: "Go! You live! Go!" To Pretorius and the Bride, he says: "You stay. We belong dead." While Henry and Elizabeth flee, the Bride hisses at the Monster. Shedding a tear, the Monster pulls a lever to trigger the laboratory and tower's destruction.

== Cast ==
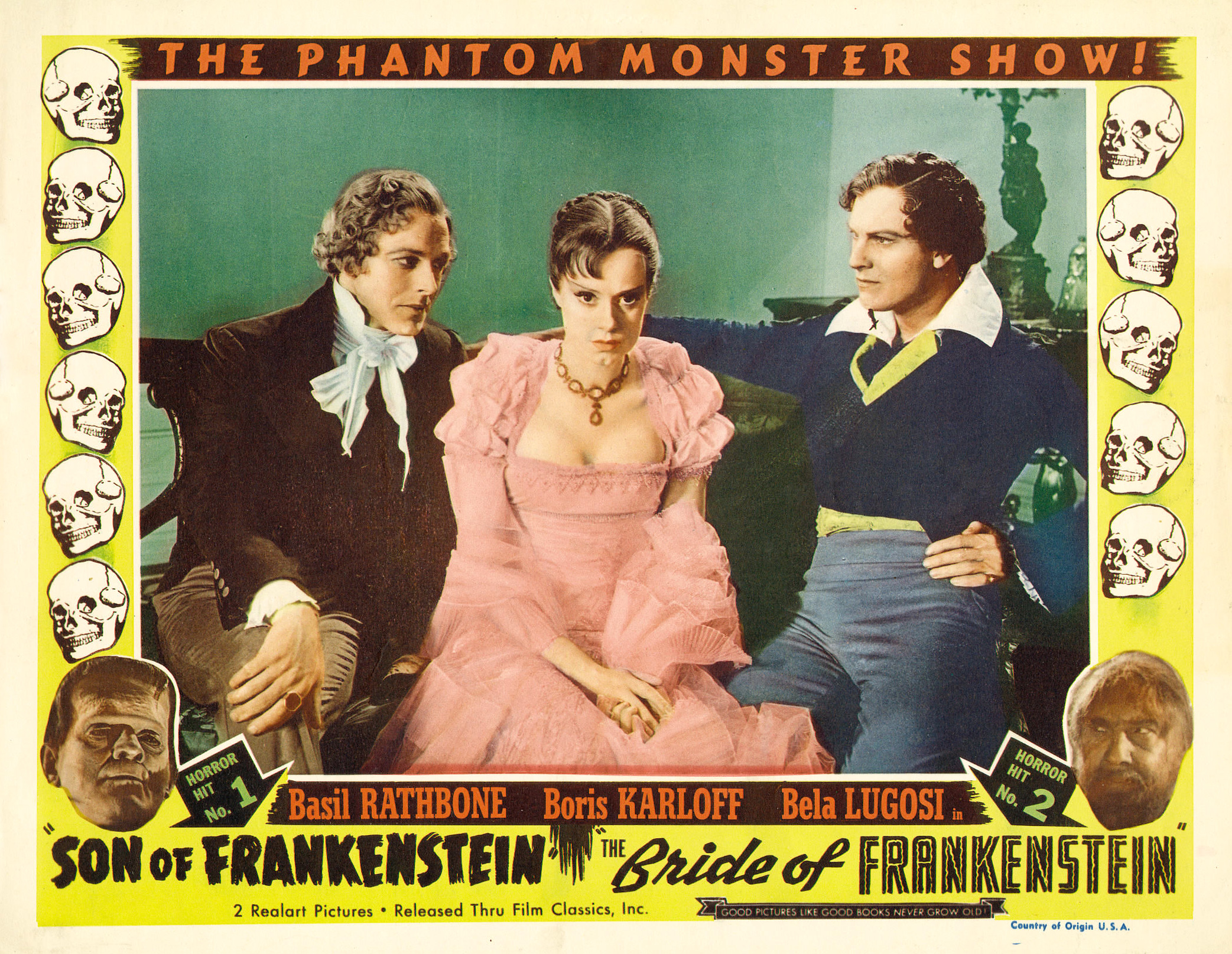
Lobby card for the 1953 re-release

PLAY 1935 trailer for Bride of Frankenstein

- Boris Karloff as Frankenstein's Monster / The Monster (credited as Karloff)
- Colin Clive as Baron Henry Frankenstein
- Valerie Hobson as Elizabeth Frankenstein
- Ernest Thesiger as Doctor Pretorius
- Elsa Lanchester as The Monster's Mate (credited as ?) and as Mary Wollstonecraft Shelley
- Gavin Gordon as Lord Byron
- Douglas Walton as Percy Bysshe Shelley
- Una O'Connor as Minnie
- E. E. Clive as the Burgomaster
- Lucien Prival as Frankenstein's butler
- O. P. Heggie as Hermit
- Dwight Frye as Karl, Pretorius' henchman
- Ted Billings as Ludwig, Pretorius' henchman
- Reginald Barlow as Hans, father of the killed girl Maria
- Mary Gordon as Hans' wife
- Anne Darling as the shepherdess
- J. Gunnis Davis as Uncle Glutz
- Walter Brennan as a peasant (uncredited, but with dialogue)
- John Carradine as a hunter (uncredited, but with dialogue)

== Production ==
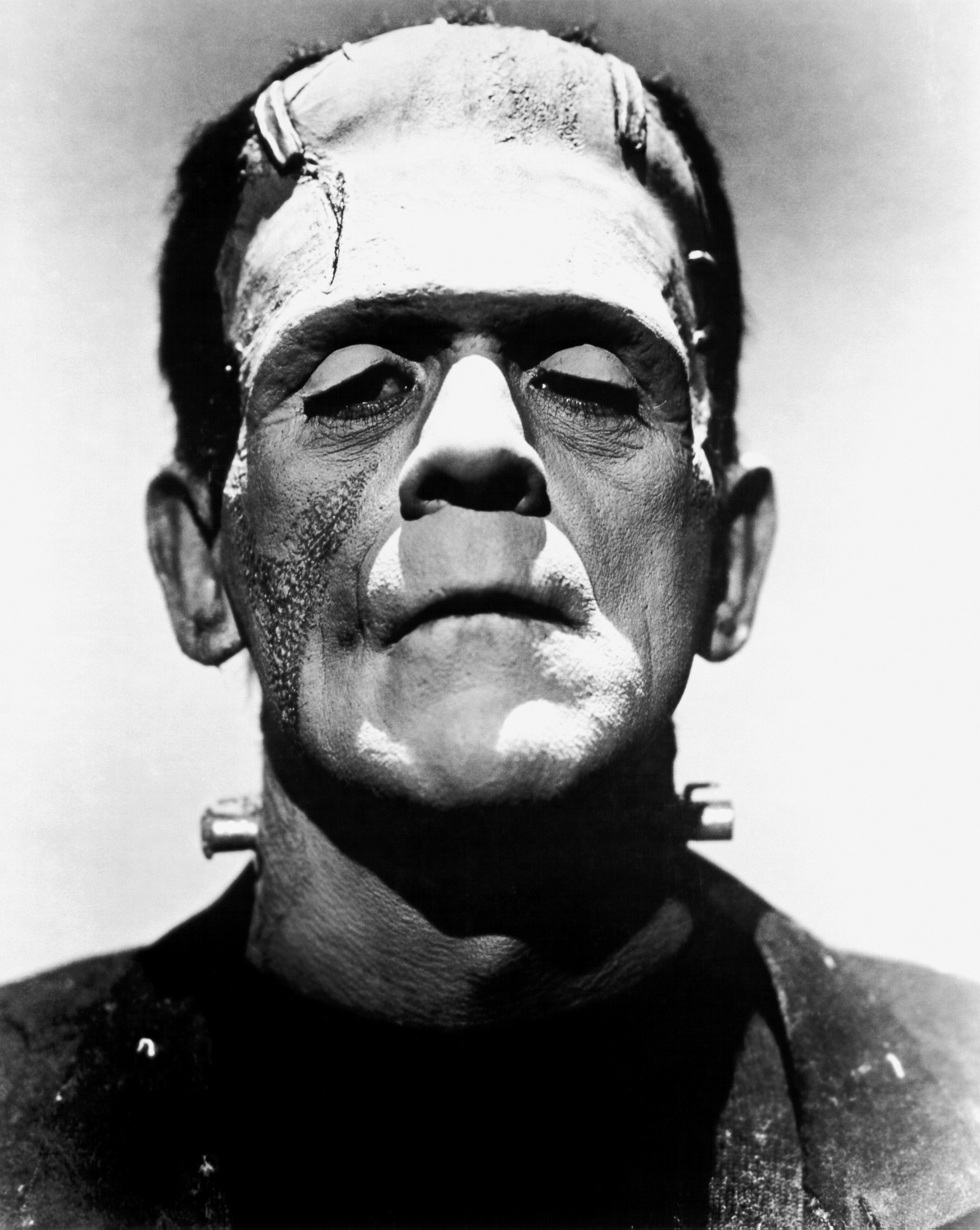
Boris Karloff as the Monster in Bride of Frankenstein

Universal considered making a sequel to Frankenstein as early as its 1931 preview screenings, following which the film's original ending was changed to allow for Henry Frankenstein's survival. James Whale initially refused to direct Bride, believing he had already "squeezed the idea dry". Kurt Neumann was originally scheduled to replace Whale but decided to film The Black Cat instead. Following the success of Whale's The Invisible Man, producer Carl Laemmle, Jr. realized that Whale was the only possible director for Bride; Whale took advantage of the situation by persuading Universal to let him make One More River. Whale believed the sequel would not top the original, so he decided instead to make it a memorable "hoot". According to a studio publicist, Whale and Universal's studio psychiatrist decided "the Monster would have the mental age of a ten-year-old boy and the emotional age of a lad of fifteen".

Screenwriter Robert Florey wrote a treatment entitled The New Adventures of Frankenstein: The Monster Lives!, but it was rejected without comment early in 1932. Universal staff writer Tom Reed wrote a treatment as The Return of Frankenstein, a title retained until filming began. Following its acceptance in 1933, Reed wrote a full script that was submitted to the Hays office for review. The script passed its review, but Whale, who by then had been contracted to direct, complained that "it stinks to heaven". L. G. Blochman and Philip MacDonald were the next writers assigned, but Whale also found their work unsatisfactory. In 1934, Whale set John L. Balderston to work on yet another version, and it was he who returned to an incident from the novel in which the Monster demands a mate. Frankenstein subsequently creates a mate, but destroys it without bringing it to life. Balderston also created the Mary Shelley prologue. After several months Whale was still not satisfied with Balderston's work and handed the project to playwright William James Hurlbut and Edmund Pearson. The final script, combining elements of a number of these versions, was submitted for Hays office review in November 1934. Kim Newman reports that Whale planned to make Elizabeth the heart donor for the bride, but film historian Scott MacQueen states that Whale never had such an intention.

Sources report that Bela Lugosi and Claude Rains were considered, with varying degrees of seriousness, for the role of Frankenstein's mentor, Pretorius; others report that the role was created specifically for Ernest Thesiger. Because of Mae Clarke's ill health, Valerie Hobson replaced her as Henry Frankenstein's love interest, Elizabeth. Early in production, Whale decided that the same actress cast to play the Bride should also play Mary Shelley in the film's prologue, to represent how the story — and horror in general — springs from the dark side of the imagination. He considered Brigitte Helm and Phyllis Brooks before deciding on Elsa Lanchester. Lanchester, who had accompanied husband Charles Laughton to Hollywood, had met with only moderate success while Laughton had made a strong impact with several films, even winning an Academy Award for Best Actor. Lanchester had returned alone to London when Whale contacted her to offer her the dual role. Lanchester modeled the Bride's hissing on that of swans. She gave herself a sore throat while filming the hissing sequence, which Whale shot from multiple angles.

Colin Clive and Boris Karloff reprised their roles from Frankenstein as creator and creation, respectively. Hobson recalled Clive's alcoholism had worsened since filming the original, but Whale did not recast the role because his "hysterical quality" was necessary for the film. Karloff strongly objected to the decision to allow the Monster to speak: "Speech! Stupid! My argument was that if the monster had any impact or charm, it was because he was inarticulate – this great, lumbering, inarticulate creature. The moment he spoke you might as well ... play it straight". This decision also meant that Karloff could not remove his dental plate, so now his cheeks did not have the sunken look of the original film. Whale and the studio psychiatrist selected 44 simple words for the Monster's vocabulary by looking at test papers of ten-year-olds working at the studio. Dwight Frye returned to play the doctor's assistant, Karl, having played the hunchback Fritz in the original. Frye also filmed a scene as an unnamed villager and the role of "Nephew Glutz", a man who murdered his uncle and blamed the death on the Monster. Boris Karloff is credited simply as KARLOFF, which was Universal's custom during the height of his career. Elsa Lanchester is credited for Mary Wollstonecraft Shelley, but in a nod to the earlier film, the Monster's bride is credited only as "?" just as Boris Karloff had been in the opening credits of Frankenstein.

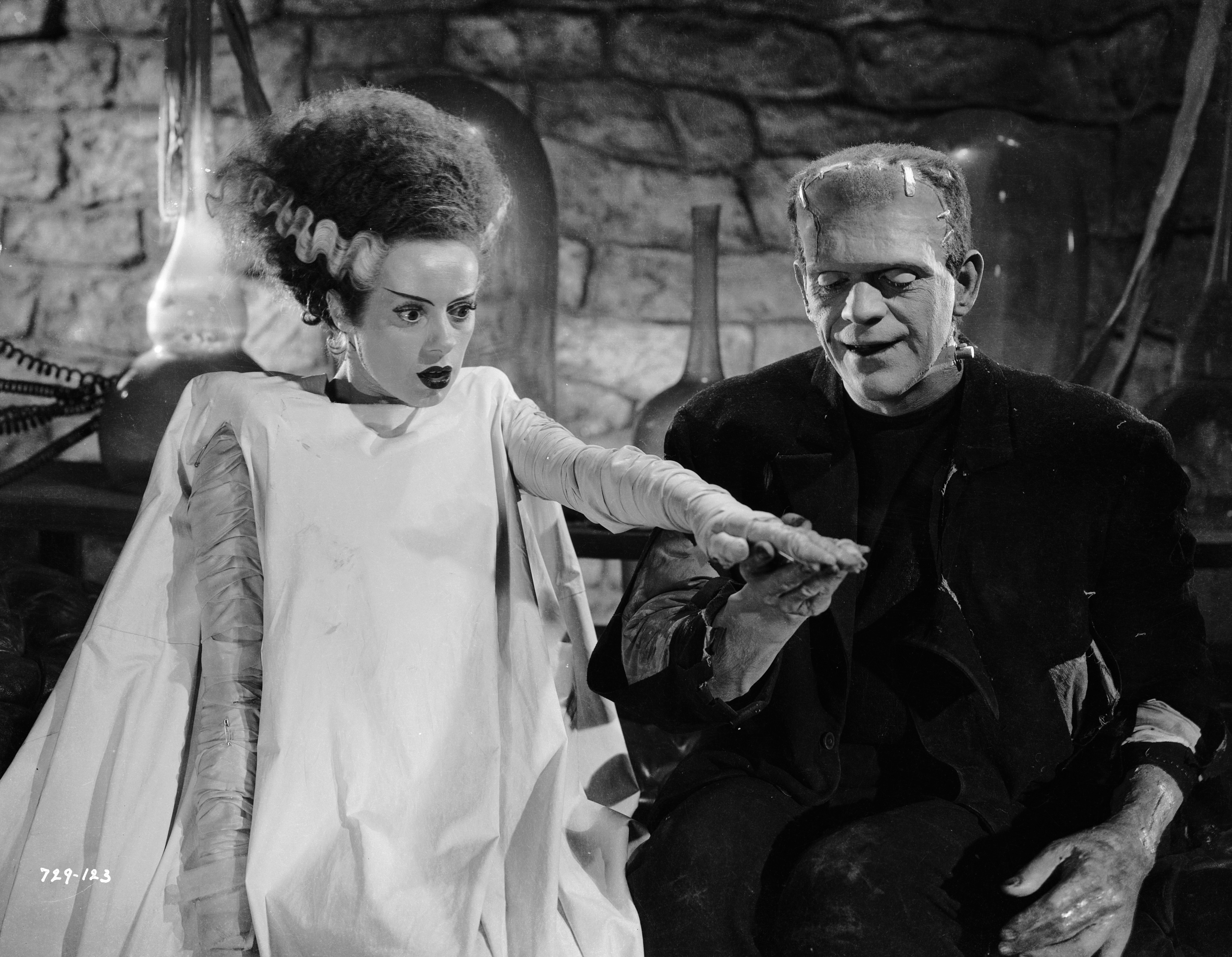
The Bride's lightning-streaked hairdo is an iconic symbol of the character and the film.

Universal makeup artist Jack Pierce paid special attention to the Monster's appearance in this film. He altered his 1931 design to display the after-effects of the mill fire, adding scars and shortening the Monster's hair. Over the course of filming, Pierce modified the Monster's makeup to indicate that the Monster's injuries were healing as the film progressed. Pierce co-created the Bride's makeup with strong input from Whale, especially regarding the Bride's iconic hair style, based on Nefertiti. Lanchester's hair was given a Marcel wave over a wire frame to achieve the style. Lanchester disliked working with Pierce, who she said "really did feel that he made these people, like he was a god ... in the morning he'd be dressed in white as if he were in hospital to perform an operation". To play Mary Shelley, Lanchester wore a white net dress embroidered with sequins of butterflies, stars, and moons, which the actress had heard required 17 women 12 weeks to make. Lanchester said of her bride costume: "I drank as little liquid as possible. It was too much of an ordeal to go to the bathroom--all those bandages--and having to be accompanied by my dresser".

Kenneth Strickfaden created and maintained the laboratory equipment. Strickfaden recycled a number of the fancifully named machines he had created for the original Frankenstein for use in Bride, including the "Cosmic Ray Diffuser", and the "Nebularium". A lightning bolt generated by Strickfaden's equipment has become a stock scene, appearing in any number of films and television shows. The man behind the film's special photographic effects was John P. Fulton, head of the special effects department at Universal Studios at the time. Fulton and David S. Horsley created the homunculi over the course of two days by shooting the actors in full-size jars against black velvet and aligning them with the perspective of the on-set jars. The foreground film plate was rotoscoped and matted onto the rear plate. Diminutive actor Billy Barty is briefly visible from the back in the finished film as a homunculus infant in a high chair, but Whale cut the infant's reveal before the film's release.

Whale met Franz Waxman at a party and asked him to score the picture. Whale told him: "Nothing will be resolved in this picture except the end destruction scene. Would you write an unresolved score for it?" Waxman created three distinctive themes: one for the Monster; one for the Bride; and one for Pretorius. The score closes, at Whale's suggestion, with a powerful dissonant chord, intended to convey the idea that the on-screen explosion was so powerful that the theater where the film was being screened was affected by it. Constantin Bakaleinikoff conducted 22 musicians to record the score in a single nine-hour session.

Shooting began on January 2, 1935, with a projected budget of US$293,750 ($6.9 million as of 2025) – almost exactly the budget of the original – and an estimated 36-day shooting schedule. On the first day, Karloff waded in the water below the destroyed windmill wearing a rubber suit under his costume. Air got into the suit and expanded it like an "obscene water lily". Later that day, Karloff broke his hip, necessitating a stunt double. Clive had also broken his leg. Shooting was completed on March 7. The film was ten days over schedule because Whale shut down the picture for ten days until Heggie became available to play the Hermit. With a final cost of $397,023 ($11.7 million as of 2025), Bride was more than $100,000 ($2.35 million as of 2025) over budget. As originally filmed, Henry died fleeing the exploding castle. Whale re-shot the ending to allow for their survival, although Clive is still visible on-screen in the collapsing laboratory. Whale completed his final cut, shortening the running time from about 90 to 75 minutes and re-shooting and re-editing the ending, only days before the film's scheduled premiere date.

== Censorship ==
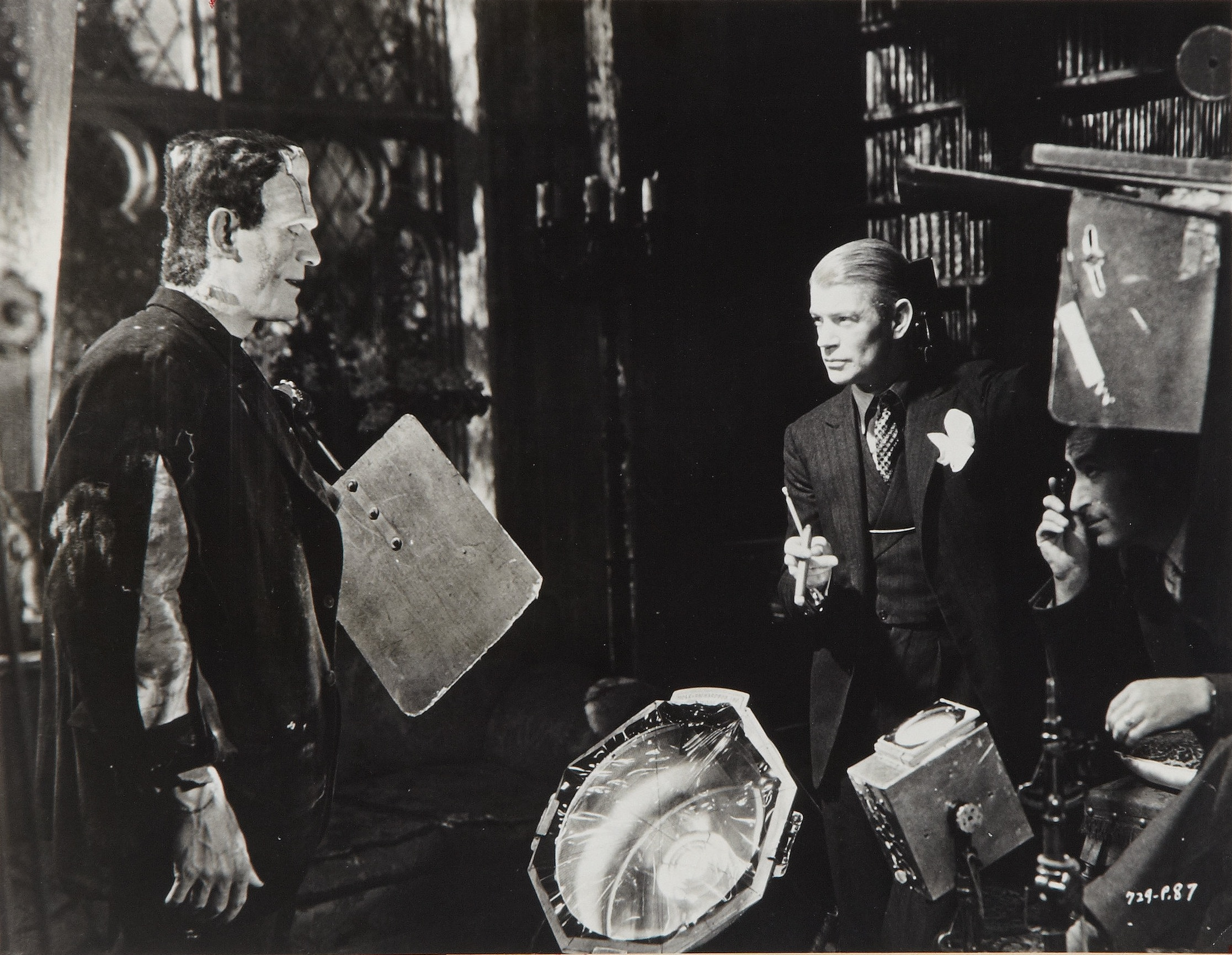
Boris Karloff, director James Whale, and cinematographer John J. Mescall on the set of Bride of Frankenstein (1935)

Bride of Frankenstein was subjected to censorship, both during production by the Hays office and following its release by local and national censorship boards. Joseph Breen, lead censor for the Hays office, objected to lines of dialogue in the originally submitted script in which Henry Frankenstein and his work were compared to that of God. He continued to object to such dialogue in revised scripts, and to a planned shot of the Monster rushing through a graveyard to a figure of a crucified Jesus and attempting to rescue the figure from the cross. Breen also objected to the number of murders, both seen and implied by the script and strongly advised Whale to reduce the number. The censors' office, upon reviewing the film in March 1935, required a number of cuts. Whale agreed to delete a sequence in which Dwight Frye's "Nephew Glutz" kills his uncle and blames the Monster, and shots of Elsa Lanchester as Mary Shelley in which Breen felt too much of her breasts were visible. Despite his earlier objection, Breen offered no objection to the cruciform imagery throughout the film – including a scene with the Monster lashed Christ-like to a pole – nor to the presentation of Pretorius as a coded homosexual. Bride of Frankenstein was approved by the Production Code office on April 15.

Following its release with the Code seal of approval, the film was challenged by the censorship board in the state of Ohio. Censors in England and China objected to the scene in which the Monster gazes longingly upon the body intended for reanimation as the Bride, citing concerns that it looked like necrophilia. Universal voluntarily withdrew the film from Sweden because of the extensive cuts demanded, and Bride was rejected outright by Trinidad, Palestine, and Hungary. Additionally, Japanese censors objected to the scene in which Pretorius chases his miniature Henry VIII with tweezers, asserting that it constituted "making a fool out of a king".

== Reception ==
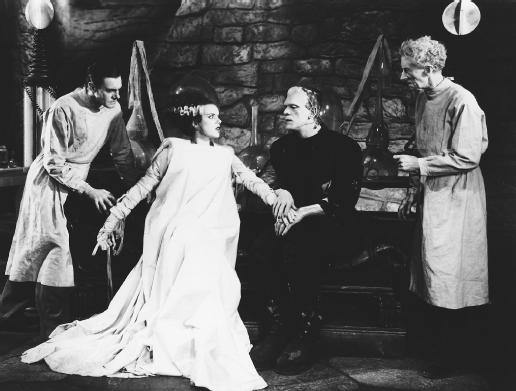
Colin Clive, Elsa Lanchester, Boris Karloff, and Ernest Thesiger

Bride of Frankenstein premiered on April 19, 1935 at the Orpheum Theater in San Francisco, (Note: Film historian Martin F. Norden says the film had its world premiere in Chicago, Illinois.) and went into general release the next day. The film was profitable for Universal, with a 1943 report showing that it had earned approximately $2 million, a profit of about $950,000.

The film was critically praised upon its release, although some reviewers did qualify their opinions based on the film's being in the horror genre. The New York World-Telegram called the film "good entertainment of its kind". The New York Post described it as "a grotesque, gruesome tale which, of its kind, is swell". The Hollywood Reporter similarly called the film "a joy for those who can appreciate it".

Variety did not so qualify its review: "[It is] one of those rare instances where none can review it, or talk about it, without mentioning the cameraman, art director, and score composer in the same breath as the actors and director". Variety also praised the cast, writing that "Karloff manages to invest the character with some subtleties of emotion that are surprisingly real and touching ... Thesiger as Dr. Pretorious [is] a diabolic characterization if ever there was one ... Lanchester handles two assignments, being first in a preamble as author Mary Shelley and then the created woman. In latter assignment she impresses quite highly".

In another unqualified review, Time wrote that the film had "a vitality that makes their efforts fully the equal of the original picture ... Screenwriters Hurlbut & Balderston and Director James Whale have given it the macabre intensity proper to all good horror pieces, but have substituted a queer kind of mechanistic pathos for the sheer evil that was Frankenstein". The Oakland Tribune concurred it was "a fantasy produced on a rather magnificent scale, with excellent stagecraft and fine photographic effects". While the Winnipeg Free Press thought that the electrical equipment might have been better suited to Buck Rogers, nonetheless the reviewer praised the film as "exciting and sometimes morbidly gruesome", declaring that "all who enjoyed Frankenstein will welcome his Bride as a worthy successor". The New York Times called Karloff "so splendid in the role that all one can say is 'he is the Monster'". The Times praised the entire principal cast and Whale's direction in concluding that Bride is "a first-rate horror film", and presciently suggested that "the Monster should become an institution, like Charlie Chan".

The film's reputation has persisted and grown in the decades since its release. In 1998, Bride of Frankenstein was added to the United States National Film Registry, having been deemed "culturally, historically or aesthetically significant". Frequently identified as James Whale's masterpiece, the film is lauded as "the finest of all gothic horror movies". Time rated Bride of Frankenstein in its "All-Time 100 Movies", in which critics Richard Corliss and Richard Schickel overruled the magazine's original review to declare the film "one of those rare sequels that is infinitely superior to its source". On the review aggregator website Rotten Tomatoes, 97% of 60 critics' reviews of the film are positive, with an average rating of 9.2/10 and the consensus: "An eccentric, campy, technically impressive, and frightening picture, James Whale's Bride of Frankenstein has aged remarkably well." Metacritic, which uses a weighted average, assigned the film a score of 95 out of 100, based on 16 critics, indicating "universal acclaim". Roger Ebert of The Chicago Sun-Times added Bride of Frankenstein to his list of The Great Movies in 1999. He described it as "the best of the Frankenstein movies--a sly, subversive work that smuggled shocking material past the censors by disguising it in the trappings of horror. Some movies age; others ripen." Ebert also added how Lanchester's character provided "one of the immortal images of the cinema with lightning-like streaks of silver in her weirdly towering hair".

In 2008, Bride was selected by Empire magazine as one of The 500 Greatest Movies of All Time. Also that year, the Boston Herald named it the second greatest horror film after Nosferatu. In 2016, James Charisma of Playboy ranked the film #7 on a list of 15 Sequels That Are Way Better Than The Originals. Entertainment Weekly considers the film superior to Frankenstein.

=== Awards ===
Bride was nominated for one Academy Award, for Sound Recording (Gilbert Kurland).

== Interpretations ==
=== Christian imagery ===
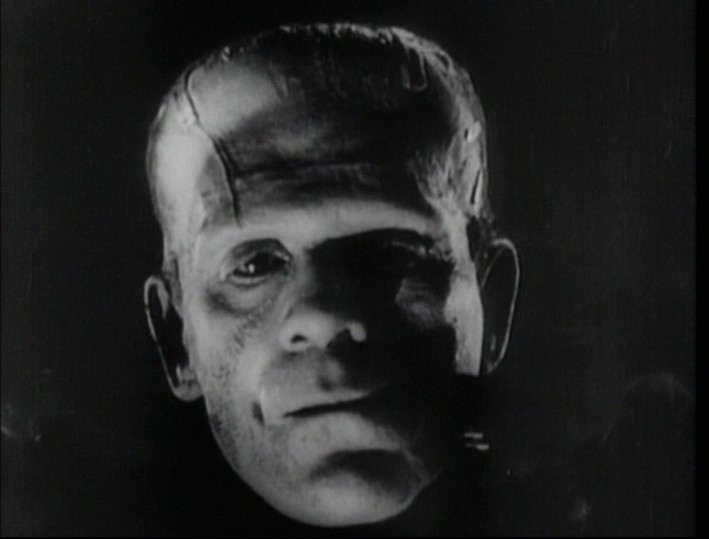
Karloff in the trailer

Christian imagery appears throughout the film. In addition to the scenes of the Monster trussed in a cruciform pose and the crucified figure of Jesus in the graveyard, the hermit has a crucifix on the wall of his hut – which, to Whale's consternation, editor Ted Kent made glow during a fade-out – and the Monster consumes the Christian sacraments of bread and wine at his "last supper" with the hermit. Horror scholar David J. Skal suggests that Whale's intention was to make a "direct comparison of Frankenstein's monster to Christ". Film scholar Scott MacQueen, noting Whale's lack of any religious convictions, disputes the notion that the Monster is a Christ-figure. Rather, the Monster is a "mockery of the divine" since, having been created by Man rather than God, it "lacks the divine spark". In crucifying the Monster, he says, Whale "pushes the audience's buttons" by inverting the central Christian belief of the death of Christ followed by the resurrection. The Monster is raised from the dead first, then crucified.

=== Gay reading ===
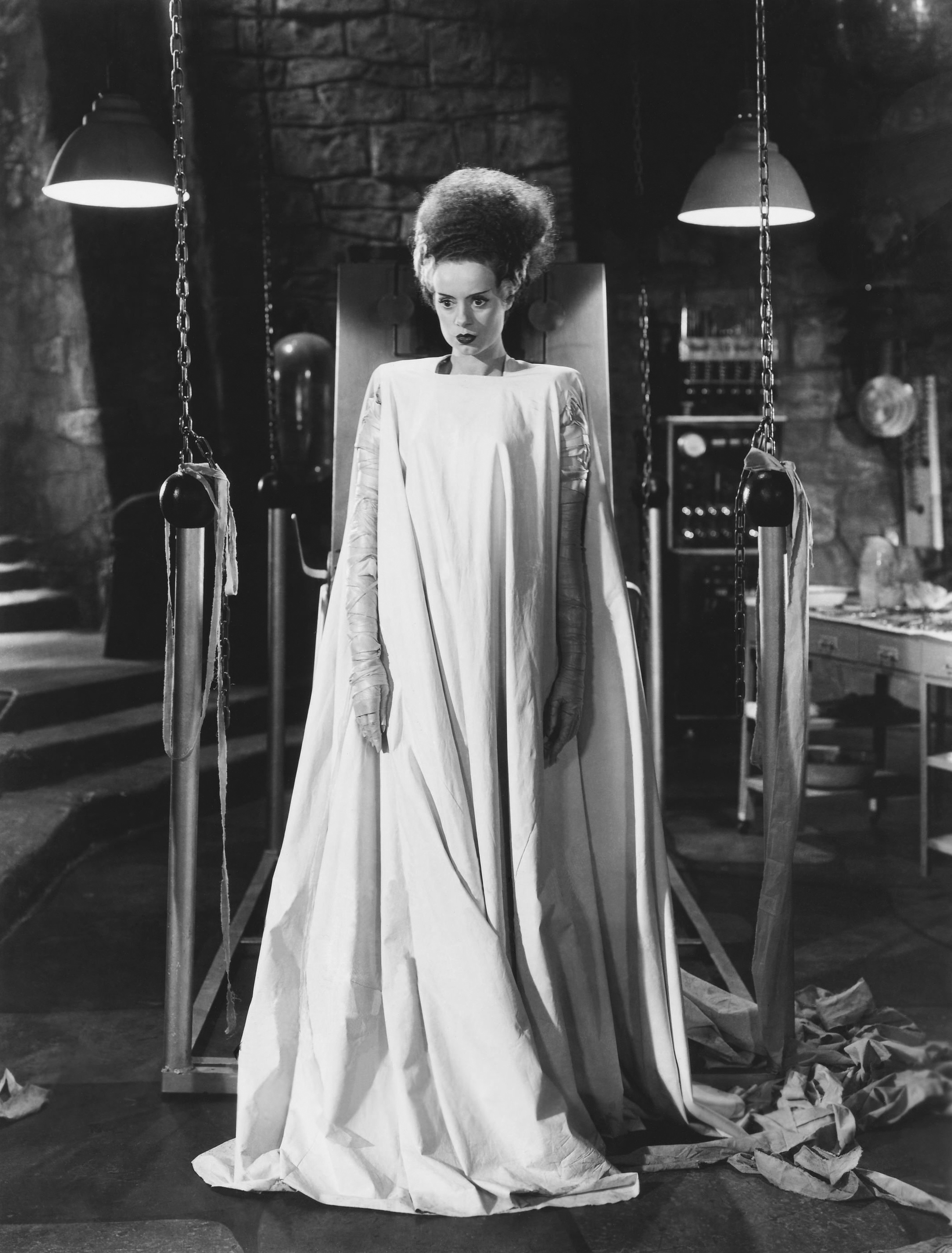
Elsa Lanchester as the Bride of Frankenstein

In the decades since its release, modern film scholars have noted the possible gay interpretations of the film. Director James Whale was openly gay, and some of the actors in the cast, including Ernest Thesiger and, according to rumor, Colin Clive, were respectively gay or bisexual. Although James Curtis, Whale's biographer, rejects the notion that Whale would have identified with the Monster from a homosexual perspective, scholars have perceived a gay subtext suffused through the film, especially a camp sensibility, particularly embodied in the character of Pretorius and his relationship with Henry.

Gay film historian Vito Russo, in considering Pretorius, stops short of identifying the character as gay, instead referring to him as "sissified", "sissy" itself being Hollywood code for "homosexual". Pretorius serves as a "gay Mephistopheles", a figure of seduction and temptation, going so far as to pull Frankenstein away from his bride on their wedding night to engage in the unnatural act of creating non-procreative life. A novelization of the film published in the United Kingdom made the implication clear, having Pretorius say to Frankenstein: "Be fruitful and multiply. Let us obey the Biblical injunction: you of course, have the choice of natural means; but as for me, I am afraid that there is no course open to me but the scientific way".

The Monster, whose affections for the male hermit and the female Bride he discusses with identical language ("friend") has been interpreted as sexually "unsettled" and bisexual. Gender studies author Elizabeth Young writes: "He has no innate understanding that the male-female bond he is to forge with the bride is assumed to be the primary one or that it carries a different sexual valence from his relationships with [Pretorius and the hermit]: all affective relationships are as easily 'friendships' as 'marriages'". Indeed, his relationship with the hermit has been interpreted as a same-sex marriage that heterosexual society will not tolerate: "No mistake – this is a marriage, and a viable one ... But Whale reminds us quickly that society does not approve. The monster – the outsider – is driven from his scene of domestic pleasure by two gun-toting rubes who happen upon this startling alliance and quickly, instinctively, proceed to destroy it", writes cultural critic Gary Morris for Bright Lights Film Journal. The creation of the Bride scene, Morris continues, is "Whale's reminder to the audience – his Hollywood bosses, peers, and everyone watching – of the majesty and power of the homosexual creator".

Filmmaker Curtis Harrington, a friend and confidant of Whale's, dismissed this as "a younger critic's evaluation. All artists do work that comes out of the unconscious mind and later on you can analyze it and say the symbolism may mean something, but artists don't think that way and I would bet my life that James Whale would never have had such concepts in mind". Specifically in response to the "majesty and power" reading, Harrington stated: "My opinion is that's just pure bullshit. That's a critical interpretation that has nothing to do with the original inspiration". He concludes: "I think the closest you can come to a homosexual metaphor in his films is to identify that certain sort of camp humor". Whale's companion David Lewis stated flatly that Whale's sexual orientation was "not germane" to his filmmaking: "Jimmy was first and foremost an artist, and his films represent the work of an artist – not a gay artist, but an artist".

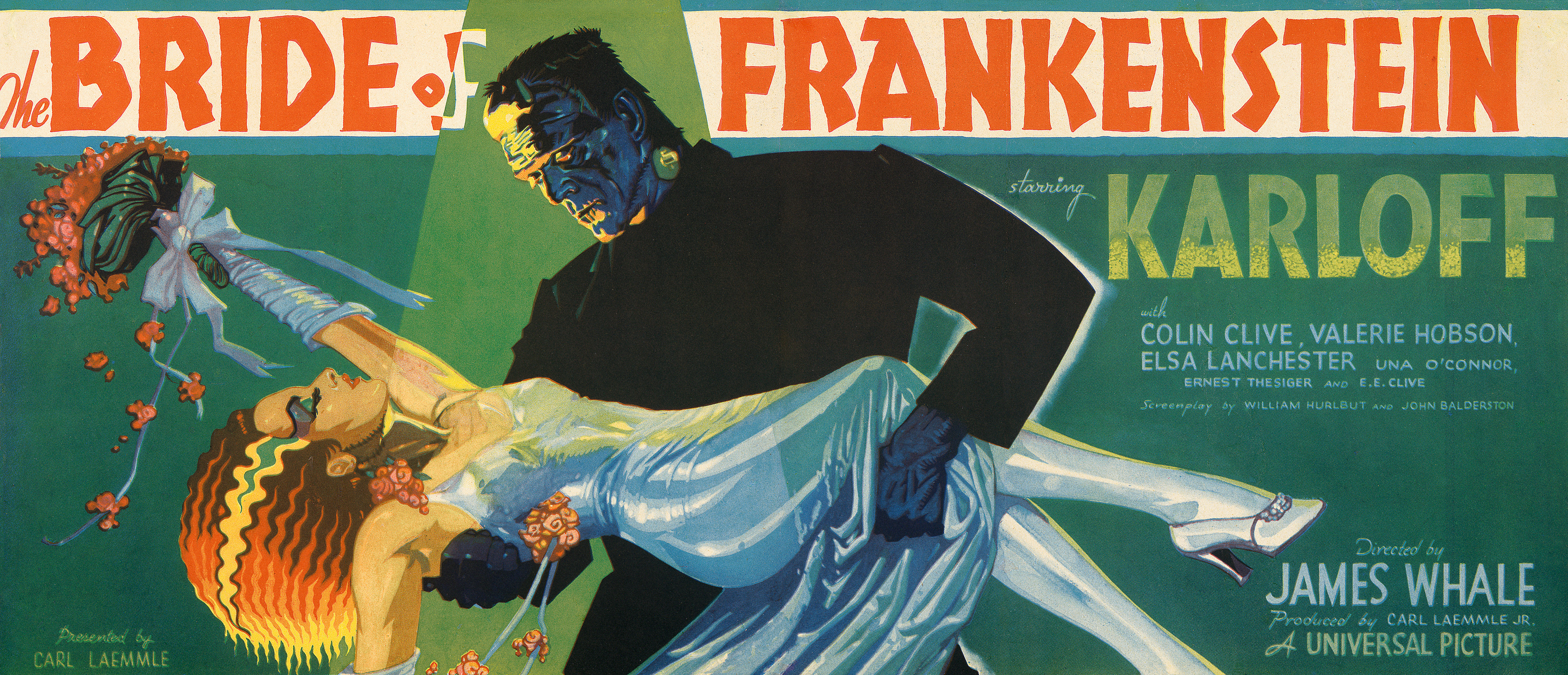
1930s Universal's art director Karoly Grosz designed this offbeat 1935 advertisement.

== Home media ==
In 1985, MCA Home Video released Bride of Frankenstein on LaserDisc. In the 1990s, MCA/Universal Home Video released the film on VHS as part of the "Universal Monsters Classic Collection", a series of releases of Universal Classic Monsters films.

In 1999, Universal released Bride of Frankenstein on VHS and DVD as part of the "Classic Monster Collection". In April 2004, Universal released Frankenstein: The Legacy Collection on DVD as part of the "Universal Legacy Collection". This two-disc release includes Bride of Frankenstein, as well as the original Frankenstein, Son of Frankenstein, The Ghost of Frankenstein, and House of Frankenstein.

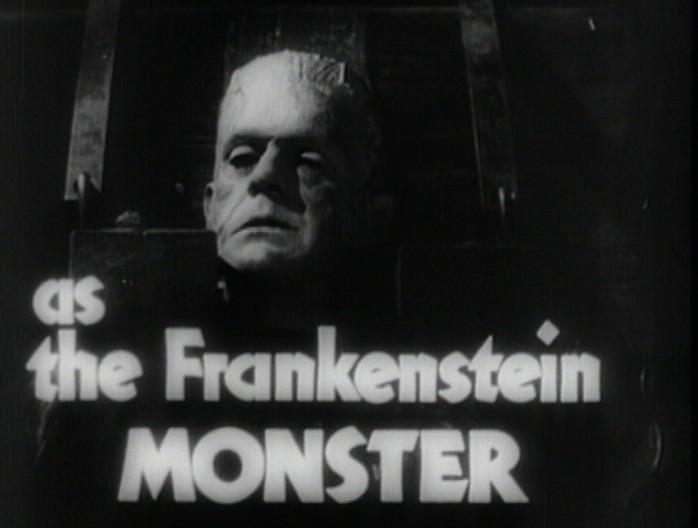
Boris Karloff in the film's trailer

In 2012, Bride of Frankenstein was released on Blu-ray as part of the Universal Classic Monsters: The Essential Collection box set, which also includes a total of nine films from the Universal Classic Monsters series. In 2014, Universal released Frankenstein: Complete Legacy Collection on DVD. This set contains eight films: Frankenstein, Bride of Frankenstein, Son of Frankenstein, The Ghost of Frankenstein, Frankenstein Meets the Wolf Man, House of Frankenstein, House of Dracula, and Abbott and Costello Meet Frankenstein. In 2015, the six-film Universal Classic Monsters Collection was released on DVD. In 2016, Bride of Frankenstein received a Walmart-exclusive Blu-ray release featuring a glow-in-the-dark cover. That same year, the Complete Legacy Collection was released on Blu-ray. In September 2017, Bride of Frankenstein received a Best Buy-exclusive SteelBook Blu-ray release with cover artwork by Alex Ross.

Bride of Frankenstein was included in the Universal Classic Monsters: Complete 30-Film Collection Blu-ray box set in August 2018. This box set also received a DVD release.

== See also ==
- Boris Karloff filmography
- List of films featuring Frankenstein's monster
- Frankenstein in popular culture
- Gods and Monsters, a 1998 James Whale biopic that draws its title from a quote from Bride of Frankenstein
- List of horror films of the 1930s
- List of films featuring miniature people
- List of cult films
- The Bride!

== Bibliography ==
- Brunas, Michael, John Brunas & Tom Weaver (1990). Universal Horrors: The Studios Classic Films, 1931–46. Qefferson, NC, McFarland & Co.
- Curtis, James (1998). James Whale: A New World of Gods and Monsters. Boston, Faber and Faber. ISBN 0-571-19285-8.
- Gelder, Ken (2000). The Horror Reader. New York, Routledge. ISBN 0-415-21355-X.
- Gifford, Denis (1973) Karloff: The Man, The Monster, The Movies. Film Fan Monthly.
- Goldman, Harry (2005). Kenneth Strickfaden, Dr. Frankenstein's Electrician. McFarland. ISBN 0-7864-2064-2.
- Johnson, Tom (1997). Censored Screams: The British Ban on Hollywood Horror in the Thirties. McFarland. ISBN 0-7864-0394-2.
- Lennig, Arthur (1993). The Immortal Count: The Life and Films of Bela Lugosi. University Press of Kentucky. ISBN 0-8131-2273-2.
- Mallory, Michael (2009) Universal Studios Monsters: A Legacy of Horror. Universe. ISBN 0-7893-1896-2.
- Mank, Gregory W. (1994). Hollywood Cauldron: Thirteen Films from the Genre's Golden Age. McFarland. ISBN 0-7864-1112-0.
- Picart, Carolyn Joan, Frank Smoot and Jayne Blodgett (2001). The Frankenstein Film Sourcebook. Greenwood Press. ISBN 0-313-31350-4.
- Russo, Vito (1987). The Celluloid Closet: Homosexuality in the Movies (revised edition). New York, HarperCollins. ISBN 0-06-096132-5.
- Skal, David J. (1993). The Monster Show: A Cultural History of Horror. Penguin Books. ISBN 0-14-024002-0.
- Vieira, Mark A. (2003). Hollywood Horror: From Gothic to Cosmic. New York, Harry N. Abrams. ISBN 0-8109-4535-5.
- Young, Elizabeth. "Here Comes The Bride". Collected in Gelder, Ken (ed.) (2000). The Horror Reader. Routledge. ISBN 0-415-21356-8.
