= Brother, Can You Spare a Dime? =

1932 song by Yip Harburg and Jay Gorney

- Sheet music cover for Americana

Song
- Published: 1932 by Harms
- Composer: Jay Gorney
- Lyricist: Yip Harburg

"Brother, Can You Spare a Dime?" is one of the best-known American songs of the Great Depression. Written by lyricist Yip Harburg and composer Jay Gorney, it was part of the 1932 revival of the musical revue Americana; the melody is based on a Russian-Jewish lullaby. The song tells the story of the universal everyman, whose honest work towards achieving the American dream has been foiled by the economic collapse. Unusual for a Broadway song, it was composed largely in a minor key. The song became best known through recordings by Bing Crosby and Rudy Vallée that were released in late 1932. The song received positive reviews and was one of the most popular songs of 1932. As one of the few popular songs during the era to discuss the darker aspects of the collapse, it came to be viewed as an anthem of the Great Depression.

== Background ==
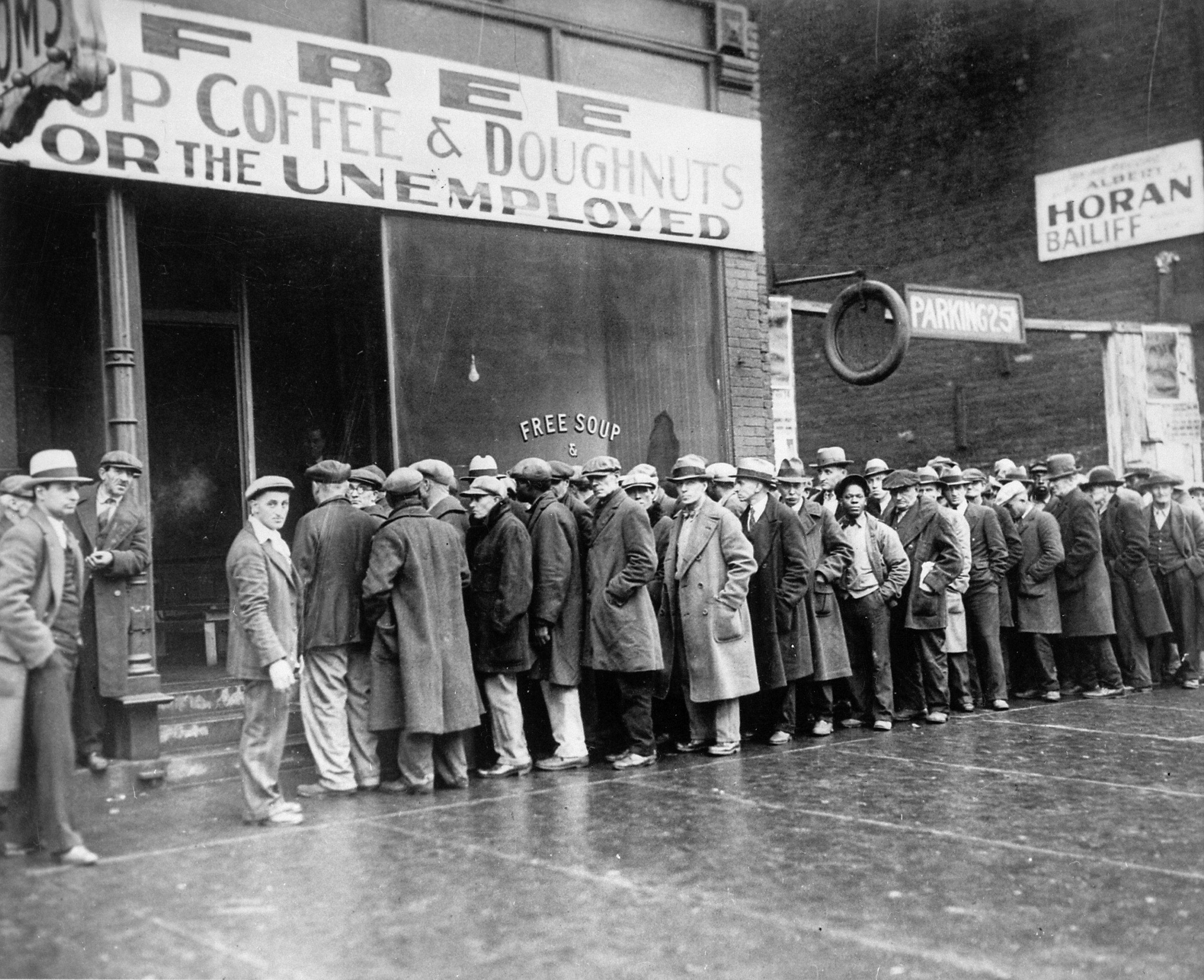
Unemployed men outside a soup kitchen in Chicago, 1931.

The Great Depression in the United States, which started with the 1929 Wall Street crash, had a severe impact on the country. In 1932, 25 percent of American men were unemployed.

After his appliance business went bankrupt, Yip Harburg had gone into the music business, working as a lyricist. The melody derives from a Jewish lullaby that the composer Jay Gorney, who emigrated to the United States in 1906, heard in his native Russia. Initially, it had other lyrics which discussed a romantic breakup. Gorney recalled that the pair came up with the title "Brother, Can You Spare a Dime?" after walking in the Central Park where they heard unemployed men asking "Can you spare a dime?" Harburg recalled that he was working on a song for the musical Americana: "We had to have a title... Not to say, my wife is sick, I've got six children, the Crash put me out of business, hand me a dime. I hate songs of that kind." Harburg's worksheets show that he went through several drafts of the lyrics, which included a satirical version attacking John D. Rockefeller and other tycoons. However, over time Harburg moved towards more concrete imagery, resulting in the final version. Both Gorney and Harburg were socialists.

== Composition and lyrical interpretation ==
The song is about a man who has sought the American dream, but was foiled by the Great Depression. He is the universal everyman who holds various professions, being a farmer and a construction worker as well as a veteran of World War I: it is intended to embrace all listeners. The man is someone "who kept faith in America, and now America has betrayed him". After three years of the Depression, the man has lost his job and is reduced to begging for charity. He recognizes the man whose dime (equivalent to $1.93 in 2025) he is asking for. The lyrics refer to "Yankee Doodle Dum", a reference to patriotism, and the evocation of veterans also recalls the mid-1932 Bonus Army protests about military bonuses payable only after 21 years. Harburg said in an interview: "the man is really saying: I made an investment in this country. Where the hell are my dividends? ... [The song] doesn't reduce him to a beggar. It makes him a dignified human being, asking questions—and a bit outraged, too, as he should be." This reflects the socialist or Marxist idea that workers deserve to enjoy the fruits of their labor, rather than have it be diverted by others.

"Brother, Can You Spare a Dime?" has an unusual structure for a Broadway song. First, rather than starting in a major key, as most Broadway songs do, it begins in a minor key, which is darker and more appropriate for the Depression. When discussing the prosperous past, the melody jumps an octave on the words "building a dream", emphasizing the dream, and moves briefly into a major key, evoking energy and optimism. This is placed in baffling and poignant contrast with the reality ("standing in line, / Just waiting for bread"). The song then reverts to the augmented dominant of the minor key in the word "time" in the line "Once I built a railroad, made it run / Made it race against time," marking the end of prosperous times, and changing to a wistful mood. Each of the three main stanzas end in a direct appeal to the listener, "Brother, Can You Spare a Dime?" The bridge deals with the singer's experiences as a veteran of the Great War, falling from patriotism "looked swell" to the discordant harmonies of "slogging through hell". The song then ends, not on a note of resignation, but with anger – repeating the beginning (as is usual for Broadway songs), an octave higher, but with a significant change: the friendly "Brother, can you spare a dime?" is replaced with the more assertive "Buddy, can you spare a dime?" According to Harold Meyerson and Ernest Harburg, "[r]hythmically and melodically it sounds like a Jewish chant." An article in Tablet magazine suggested that the melody was similar to Hatikvah, the Israeli national anthem.

== Musical and cover versions ==
The song was first performed by the vaudeville singer Rex Weber as part of the musical Americana, which ran from October to December 1932 and was not a success. Three weeks after Americana opened, the song was covered by crooner Bing Crosby for Brunswick Records; it was also covered by Rudy Vallee shortly thereafter for Columbia Records. Unusually, Vallee's version includes a spoken introduction, in which the narrator states that the song is "a bit out of character" for him. The song became popular through these versions, which were both frequently aired on the radio and competed for listeners. By the end of the year, Al Jolson had also covered the song on his popular show for NBC. The song has been covered by at least 52 artists in the United States including Judy Collins and Tom Waits.

In the UK, it was recorded by Harry Roy and his Orchestra (From the Cafe Anglais, London) in 1933 and issued by Parlophone, with vocals by Bill Currie, featuring non-vocal speech by Currie and Roy. A version by Lew Stone and his Band (again at the Cafe Anglais) was recorded the same year for a "Lew Stone Favourites" medley, with vocals by Al Bowlly, and released by Decca. In 1948, a revival of the song by British vocalist Steve Conway was released on Columbia.

During the 1970s stagflation and in light of the Watergate scandal, Harburg wrote a parody version for The New York Times:

Once we had a Roosevelt
Praise the Lord!
Life had meaning and hope.
Now we're stuck with Nixon, Agnew, Ford,
Brother, can you spare a rope?

== Reception and legacy ==
At the time, reviews of musicals rarely devoted much space to the songs' lyrics and melody. That was not true of the reviews of Americana. In The New York Times, Brooks Atkinson wrote that "Brother, Can You Spare a Dime?" was "plaintive and thundering" and "the first song of the year that can be sung ... Mr. Gorney has expressed the spirit of these times with more heart-breaking anguish than any of the prose bards of the day." Gilbert Gabriel in New York American wrote: "Gorney and Harburg have written something so stirring that it will run away with the whole show". Theater Arts Monthly's review stated that the song "deflates the rolling bombast of our political nightmare with greater effect than all the rest of Mr. McEvoy's satirical skits put together"; Variety said that "Brother" was the only part of the show worth praising. Harburg later wrote that the song earned him several thousand dollars and helped him get started in the music business. Business leaders tried to have it banned from the radio, viewing the song as "a dangerous attack on the American economic system". They were unsuccessful, due to the song's popularity. William Zinsser writes that "[t]he song so lacerated the national conscience that radio stations banned it" for being "sympathetic to the unemployed".

Few thematic Depression songs were popular, because Americans did not want music which reminded them of the economic situation, but "Brother, Can You Spare a Dime?" was "the exception that proved the rule". Unlike other popular songs of the same era which tended to be upbeat, with titles such as "Happy Days Are Here Again" (1929), "On the Sunny Side of the Street" (1930), and "Life Is Just a Bowl of Cherries" (1931), "Brother" "put words and music to what many Americans were feeling—fear, grief, even anger". The song was one of the first musical works to take the Depression seriously. It was one of the most popular twenty songs of 1932 in the United States. Philip Furia and Michael Lasser wrote that the song "embodied the Depression for millions of Americans... No other popular song caught the spirit of its time with such urgency." In 2007, Clyde Haberman wrote that the song "endures as an anthem for the downtrodden and the forgotten". In 2011, Zinsser wrote that "Brother" "still hovers in the national memory; I can hear its ghostly echo in the chants of the Occupy Wall Street marchers". In a 2008 retrospective, NPR described it as "the anthem of the Great Depression".

According to Meyerson and Ernest Harburg, the challenge that Yip Harburg faced in crafting the lyrics was "much like the challenge confronting the street-corner panhandler: to establish the character's individuality and the moral and political basis for his claim". They write that the latter achieved this by gradually building intimacy with the listener, starting in third person and moving into first, second, and then both first and second combined ("I'm your pal"). The internal rhymes help the listener remember that the singer was working towards a dream, which is now shattered. They also write that the song is a "masterpiece of economy" in building towards a "climactic assertion of commonality and interdependency" in "I'm your pal". "The music and lyrics together make us feel the quiet desperation of the singer."

Pianist Rob Kapilow remarked that the title is "the entire history of the Depression in a single phrase" and the listener ends up "feeling the time-immemorial complaint that the working man doesn't get the rewards". He says that Harburg and Gorney were brave to express this message in 1932 "when no one was saying this out loud". Furia and Lasser write that the song is unusual in relying on a strong narrative instead of emotion or imagery. Thomas S. Hischak wrote that the song was "one of the first theatre songs to have a potent sociological message, and it remains one of the most powerful of the genre". The song was the most prominent cultural representation of the Bonus Army. In June 2026, CBS News included the song in its list of the 250 essential American songs of the past 250 years.
