= Maid in America =

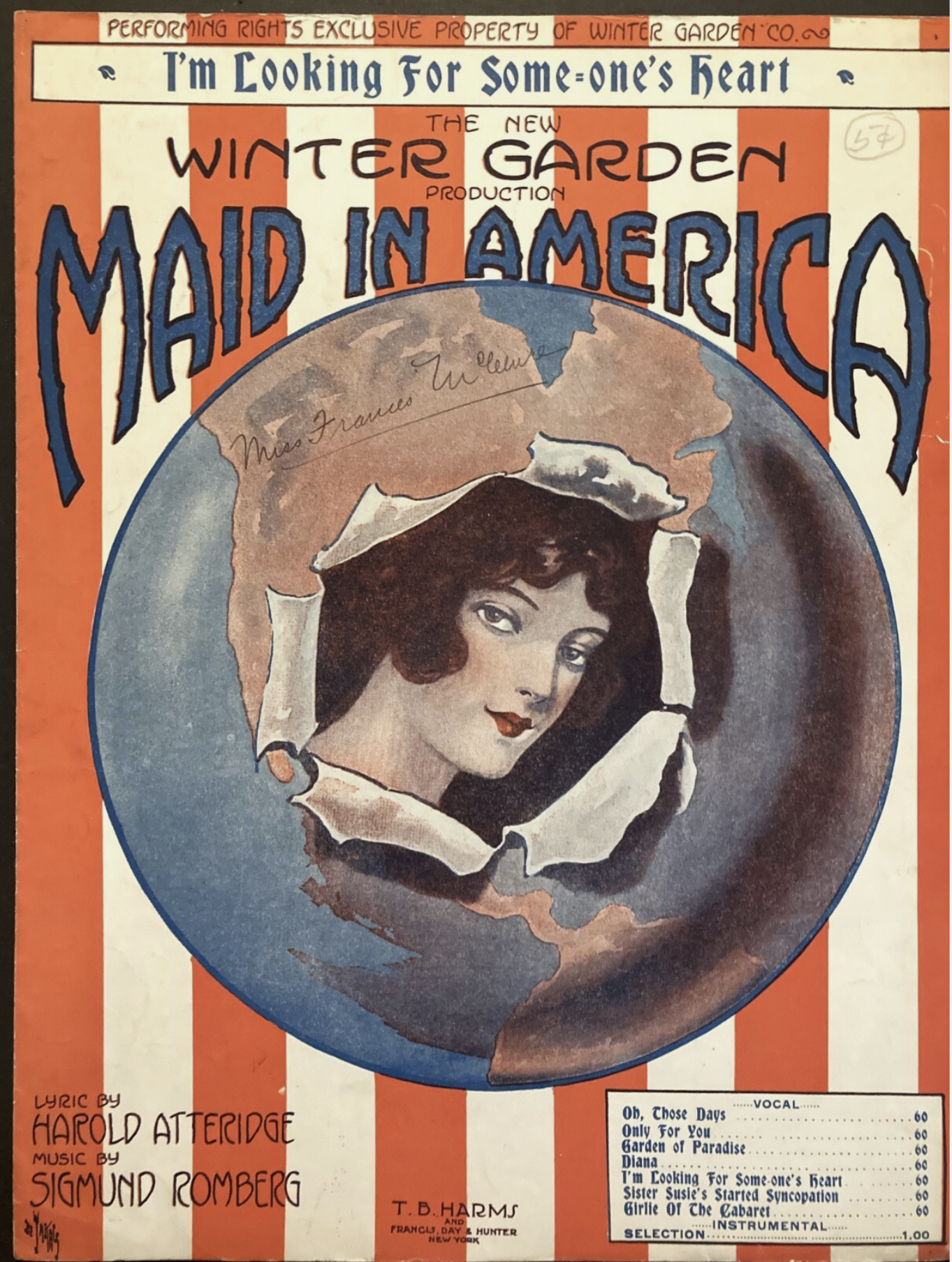
1915 sheet music cover for "I'm Looking for Someone's Heart" from Maid in America. The chorus girls had flashlights shining into the audience during this musical number.

Maid in America is a musical revue in two acts and twelve scenes with lyrics by Harold Atteridge and music by Sigmund Romberg and Harry Carroll. Atteridge was also credited with writing the song cues, and the dialogue was attributed to the "actors and their friends." The musical also contained a ballet choreographed by Theodore Kosloff. The work had no plot to speak of and was constructed as a series of vignettes derived from vaudeville or music hall type entertainments.

Maid in America premiered on February 9, 1915 at the Teck Theatre in Buffalo, New York. It transferred to Broadway at the Winter Garden Theatre on February 18, 1915. It ran there for a total of 108 performances; closing on May 22, 1915. It was produced by the Shubert brothers and staged by J. C. Huffman. The original cast was led by Harry Fox as The Comedian and Nora Bayes as Nettie. Other actors included Maude Lambert as Anna Gray, Hal Forde as John Gray, Blossom Seeley as the Society Lady, Charles Ross as George Rival, Lew Brice as the Coat Room Boy, Yansci Dolly as both Gaby and the Bride, Minerva Coverdale as The Chorus Girl, Belle Ashlyn as both The French Actress and Miss Wise-Un, James Clemons as Frederick, Sam Adams as Ignatz, Carl Dellorto as Ignatz the Second, Joe Jackson as the Vagabond, Bert Clark as the English Lord, John Sparks as The Man from Home, and Yvette as The Cabaret Entertainer. Several of the actors portrayed multiple characters in the different burlesque vignettes which were not listed in the billing.

After the Broadway run ended the musical ran at the Shubert Theatre in Boston and the Palace Theatre in Chicago. It then toured the United States with a cast led by Florence Moore in the 1915-1916 season.

== Music ==
Herman Avery Wade arranged a selection of songs from the show for Universal Music and a Universal Music Melody Roll.

- Oh! Those Days
- The Stolen Melody
- Sister Suzie's Started Syncopatin
- I'm Looking For Someone's Heart

The song "I've been floating down the old green river" by Bert Kalmar and Joe Cooper was interpolated into the revue. Sheet music for it was published in 1915 by Waterson, Berlin & Snyder Co. in New York City. One of the song's lyrics is "I've been floating down the old green river on the good ship Rock and Rye. But I floated too far, I got stuck on a bar." Billy Murray made a 1916 recording of it.
