= Americana (revue) =

1920s musical

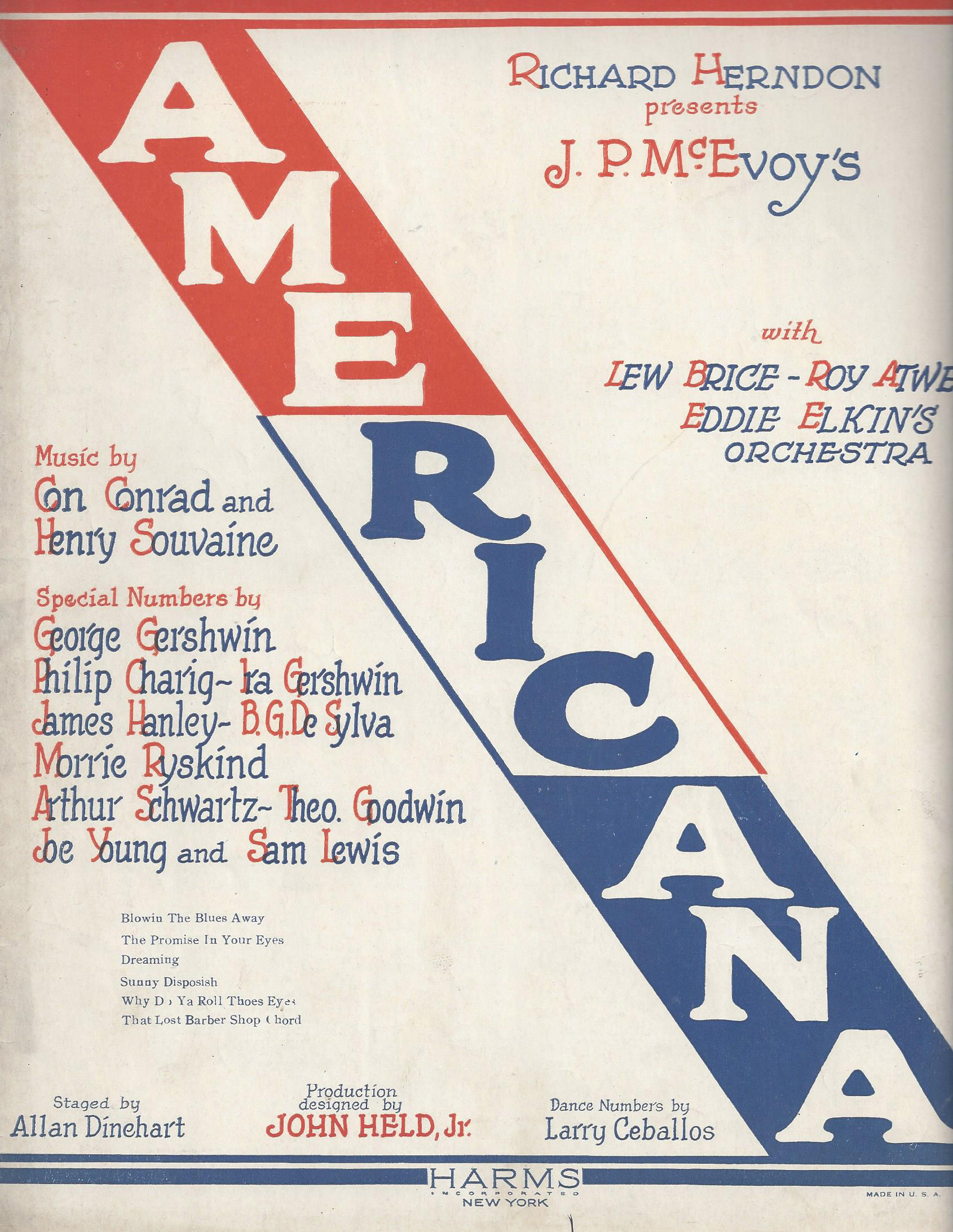
- Sheet Music Cover
- Music: Con Conrad and Henry Souvaine
- Lyrics: J. P. McEvoy
- Book: J. P. McEvoy

Americana is a musical revue in two parts, with book and lyrics by J. P. McEvoy, and music by Con Conrad with additional numbers by George Gershwin, Ira Gershwin, Philip Charig, James Hanley, B. G. DeSylva, Morrie Ryskind, Arthur Schwartz, Theo Goodwin, Joe Young, and Sam Lewis. The show was presented by Richard Herndon at the Belmont Theatre (121 W. 48th Street, New York, NY), and, after many postponements, opened July 26, 1926. The show was staged by Allan Dinehart with dance numbers by Larry Ceballos. The production was designed by John Held, Jr. It ran for 224 performances, closing in February 1927. The cast headlined Lew Brice, Roy Atwell, Betty Compton, Charles Butterworth and the Eddie Elkins Orchestra. The New York Times review called it a "witty, ingenious and sophisticated evening of fun-making, it made up in its abundant humor for more than it lacked in some other departments." The other departments referred to were lack of chorus girls and opulent settings.

The revue was revived on October 30, 1928, at Lew Fields’ Mansfield Theatre for 12 performances, closing November 3, 1928. It had music by Roger Wolfe Kahn and lyrics by J. P. McEvoy and Irving Caesar. The cast included Frances Gershwin, the younger sister of George and Ira Gershwin. The New York Times review called it "a reasonably bright and generally entertaining revue . . ."

After trying out in Philadelphia, the show was revived once again on October 5, 1932, at the Shubert Theatre running for 77 performances until December 1932. It was produced by Lee Shubert and had music by Jay Gorney, Harold Arlen, Herman Hupfeld, and Richard Myers, with lyrics by E. Y. Harburg and sketches by J. P. McEvoy. It was directed by Harold Johnsrud with scenic design by Albert R. Johnson. The cast included Don Barclay, George Givot, the Doris Humphrey Dance Group, Lloyd Nolan, and the Charles Weidman Dancers. It contained the famous song, “Brother, Can You Spare a Dime?”, which a New York Times review called "the first song of the year that can be sung" and remarked "Mr. Gorney has expressed the spirit of these times with more heart-breaking anguish than any of the prose bards of the day." The show was also favorably reviewed for its dance numbers.

== Songs ==
First Production

- "American Revue Girls" (Words by J. P. McEvoy, music by Con Conrad)
- "Sunny Disposish" (Words by Ira Gershwin, music by Philip Charig)
- "That Lost Barber Shop Chord" (Words by Ira Gershwin, music by George Gershwin)
- "Blowing the Blues Away" (Words by Ira Gershwin, music by Philip Charig)
- "Dreaming" (Words by J. P. McEvoy, music by Henry Souvaine and Con Conrad)
- "The Promise in your Eyes"
- "Cavalier Americana" (Libretto by J. P. McEvoy, music by Henry Souvaine "(with apologies)"
- "Riverside Bus" (Words by J. P. McEvoy, music by Con Conrad)
- "The Volga Boatmen"
- "Tabloid Papers" (Words by J. P. McEvoy, music by Con Conrad)
- "Why Do Ya Roll Those Eyes" (Words by Morrie Ryskind, music by Philip Charig)
- "Just Lovin'" (Words by J. P. McEvoy, music by Henry Souvaine)
- "Scrubwomen's Ballet" (Music by Henry Souvaine)
- "Thanks Awful" (Words by Joe Young and Sam Lewis, music by Con Conrad)

Third Production

- "Get That Sun Into You" (Words by E. Y. Harburg, music by Richard Myers)
- "Whistling For a Kiss" (Words by E. Y. Harburg and Johnny Mercer, music by Richard Myers)
- "Satan’s Li’l Lamb" (Words by E. Y. Harburg and Johnny Mercer, music by Harold Arlen)
- "You're Not Pretty But You're Mine" (Words by E. Y. Harburg, music by Burton Lane)
- "Brother, Can You Spare a Dime?" (Words by E. Y. Harburg, music by Jay Gorney)
- "Let Me Match My Private Life With Yours" (Words by E. Y. Harburg, music by Vernon Duke)
- "Ringside–Madison Square Garden" (Music by Winthrop Sargeant)
- "Five Minutes of Spring" (Words by E. Y. Harburg, music by Jay Gorney)
- "Would’ja For a Big Red Apple" (Words by Johnny Mercer, music by Henry Souvane and Everett Miller)
- "Amour a la Militaire" (Music by Bernard Herrmann)
- "If I Love Again"

Americana 1932 sheet music
