= Lew Brice =

American actor, dancer and comedian

Lew Brice (October 26, 1893 – June 16, 1966) was an American dancer, actor, and comedian. Like his sister, the actress and comedian Fannie Brice, he had a career in vaudeville and Broadway musicals during the first three decades of the twentieth century. He also appeared in both silent and sound films. Unlike his sister, he was never a major star, although he was considered a gifted dancer. He had several marriages to women whom he performed with, including a marriage to Mae Clarke from 1928-1930. He was a close friend of his sister Fannie's husband, the gambler Nicky Arnstein, and maintained a close relationship with Arnstein long after he and Fannie divorced.

== Early life ==
The younger brother of comedian, actress, and singer Fannie Brice, Lew Brice was born on October 26, 1893 in Manhattan, New York City. His birth name was Louis Borach. He was the youngest of four children born to Charles Borach, an Alsatian immigrant, and Rose Borach (née Stern), a Hungarian Jewish woman who emigrated to America at age ten. Charles and Rose were saloon owners. They had four children, Philip (born 1887), Carrie (born 1889), Fania, and Louis. He had a close relationship with his sister Fannie as a child; often assisting her in their growing up years in various forms of mischief and deception in the pursuit of either fun or ways to make money. This included episodes of skipping school and elicit trips to Coney Island without the knowledge of their parents. The duo also spent time entertaining the neighbors by putting on impromptu shows with Lew showing off his natural dancing abilities while Fannie sang.

== Early career ==
By 1906 Lew was competing in amateur dance contents in New York, and studied soft-shoe dancing with a professional named Bower. By 1909 he was working professionally in a touring show, The Trocaderos, as one part of the dancing Newsboys Trio. When one of the female leads in the show quit and the production needed a new star quickly, Lew convinced the producers to hire Fanny. It was her first lead role in a professional show. Later that same year Lew joined George M. Cohan and Sam H. Harris's minstrel show (Cohan & Harris Minstrels) which starred George "Honey Boy" Evans. Under the advice of Jeremiah Cohan, George's father, he switched from tap dancing to eccentric dance, and in this medium performed in the Ziegfeld Follies of 1910 for his Broadway debut. He got hired for the Follies after Fannie recommended him to Florence Ziegfeld as a replacement act for the Four Fords.

In early 1911 Lew toured in the show The Queen of Bohemia in which he was featured as both a singer an eccentric dancer. For the 1911-1912 season he toured in vaudeville in Gus Edwards's School Boys and Girls before forming his own singing and dancing act in partnership with Lillian Gonne. By the end of 1912 he was working with Gonne in the Orpheum Circuit on the west coast of the United States. After touring the United States in the first half of 1913, the team of Brice and Gonne were hired for the summer 1913 version of The Passing Show Broadway revue. It opened at the Winter Garden Theatre on July 24, 1913 with Lew as The Parcel Postman. After this show closed, Brice and Gonne resumed performing in vaudeville together in the autumn of 1913. He continued to perform with Gonne until February 1914 when he married dancer Tillie Zick (real name Sybil Marie Hitt). The marriage was short lived and ended in a rapid annulment.

Brice returned to Broadway for The Passing Show of 1914 in which he portrayed the roles of Huerta, Joe Oswald, and a priest. After this he returned to the Winter Garden Theatre as the Coat Room Boy in Harold Atteridge, Sigmund Romberg and Harry Carroll's revue Maid in America in 1915. Following the close of this show he began performing in a new vaudeville dance act with Muriel Worth in August 1915. "Muriel Worth" was in fact the new stage name of Sybil Marie Hitt, and Lew married her a second time in 1915. They performed in vaudeville together until February 1917 when they started appearing in separate acts in the Orpheum Circuit. A second divorce followed in July 1917. During their marriage Lew appeared as The Honorable Bertie Epsom in the Broadway show Step This Way (1916) at the Shubert Theatre.

== Later life and career ==
In 1917 Brice briefly formed in a vaudeville act with the Barr twins, but this soon ended when he was called to service in the United States Army during World War I. After his war service ended in 1919 he formed another act, Dances and Tunes of 1919, with pianist Rube Beckwith and Adelaide Mason. Lew had a compulsive gambling habit which worsened in the post-war years as he became closer to Fanny's husband, the con artist and gambler Nicky Arnstein. His sister often had to rescue him financially. He continued to work regularly in vaudeville in the 1920s, but often recycled old material and did not work to develop fresh content to the chagrin of his sister Fannie who felt he was waisting his talent. He also appeared in a handful of silent films in the 1920s; including The Income Tax Collector (1923), Partners Again (1926, as Pazinsky), and Lew Tyler's Wives (1926, as Buzzy Mandelbush).

Brice returned to Broadway in J. P. McEvoy and Con Conrad revue Americana. which played at the Belmont Theatre from July 26, 1926 into February 1927. In this show he portrayed the father to the little boy Rollo. He married actress Mae Clarke on February 6, 1928. The union ended in divorce in 1930. During their marriage the couple worked together in a vaudeville act created for them by Fanny and Billy Rose. Lew returned to Broadway in 1931 to perform alongside his sister in the show Billy Rose's Crazy Quilt at the 44th Street Theatre. He appeared in minor parts in two feature-length sound films: Happy Days (1929, as a Minstrel Show Performer) and Two Seconds (1932, as a reporter) He also worked with Nelly Edwards in a one-reel Vitaphone comedy short film, The Window Cleaners (1930). The film featured the song of the same name and was adapted from Brice and Edwards's vaudeville routine.

In the year after Brice and Clarke's divorce the film The Public Enemy (1931) was released. It contained one of cinema's more famous, and frequently parodied, scenes, in which James Cagney pushes a half grapefruit into Clarke's face, then goes out to pick up Jean Harlow. The film was so popular that it ran 24 hours per day at a movie theatre in Times Square upon its initial release. Four months after the premiere, The Hollywood Reporter informed readers that Brice claimed to have seen the film more than 20 times, and at least twice per week, and that Brice "says he goes to see the scene wherein Mae Clarke gets hit in the eye with a grapefruit—and that it's a plazure!" (Note: In an article published in Variety more than two years after the film's release, Brice's total number of claimed viewings had somehow dwindled to eight. In James Cagney's 1976 autobiography, he claims that Clarke's disgruntled ex—mistakenly dubbed Monte Brice—soon had the grapefruit scene timed so as to arrive shortly beforehand and depart immediately thereafter.)

In his later life Brice lived in Los Angeles, California, and for a time Nicky Arnstein lived with him. He remained Nicky's closest friend until Arnstein died in 1965. He died June 16, 1966, in Hollywood, California, aged 72.
