= Courland (disambiguation) =

Courland is one of the historical and cultural regions of Latvia.

Courland may also refer to:

Political entities

- Bishopric of Courland, an ecclesiastical state in the Livonian Confederation 1254-1562
- Duchy of Courland and Semigallia, 1561–1795 (including a list of dukes)
  - Duchess of Courland, a list
- Courland Governorate, a Baltic governorate of the Russian Empire 1795–1915
- Provisional Land Council of Courland, 1917
- Duchy of Courland and Semigallia (1918), a short-lived client state of the German Empire

Other uses

- Courland (Saeima constituency), constituency of the Saeima, the national legislature of Latvia
- Courland Peninsula, the north-western part of Courland
- Courland Pocket, the part of the Courland Peninsula in which Axis forces were confined by the Red Army July 1944 - May 1945
- Army Group Courland, Axis forces in the Courland Pocket January - May 1945

== See also ==
- Kurland (disambiguation) (the German name)
- Kurzeme (disambiguation) (the Latvian name)
