= Lady Killer (1933 film) =

1933 film by Roy Del Ruth

- Poster of The Lady Killer
- Directed by: Roy Del Ruth
- Screenplay by: Ben Markson; Lillie Hayward
- Story by: Rosalind Keating Shaffer; Darryl F. Zanuck (uncredited)
- Produced by: Henry Blanke
- Starring: James Cagney; Mae Clarke; Margaret Lindsay
- Cinematography: Tony Gaudio
- Edited by: George Amy
- Music by: Leo F. Forbstein
- Production company: Warner Bros. Pictures
- Distributed by: Warner Bros. Pictures
- Release date: December 3, 1933
- Running time: 76 minutes
- Country: United States
- Language: English

Lady Killer is a 1933 American pre-Code crime drama film starring James Cagney, Mae Clarke, and Margaret Lindsay, based on the story "The Finger Man" by Rosalind Keating Shaffer. The picture was directed by Roy Del Ruth.

== Plot ==
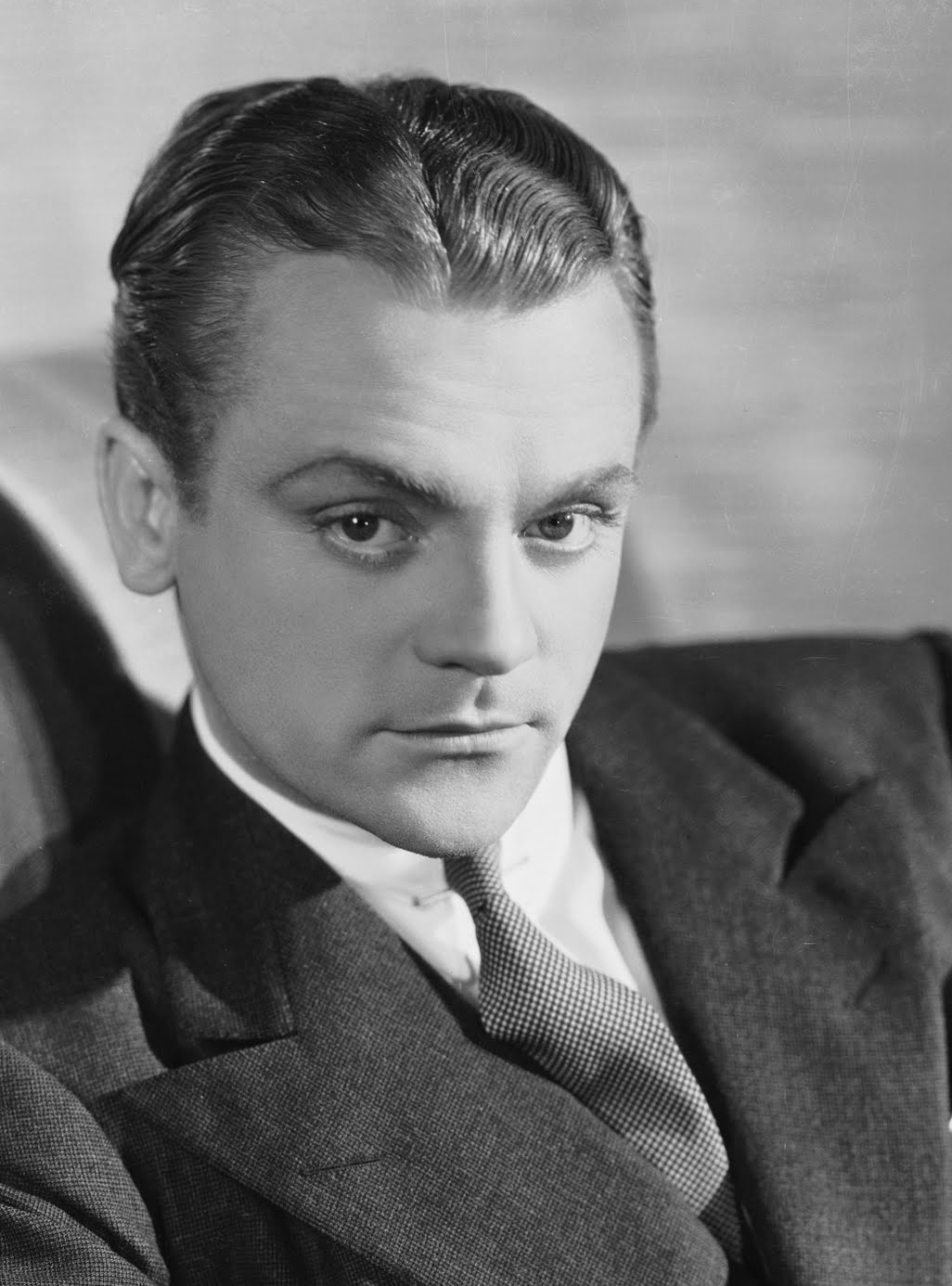
James Cagney

After being fired as a theater usher for gambling and other issues, Dan Quigley tracks down Myra Gale to her apartment and returns the purse she dropped. He then sits in on a poker game with her "brother-in-law", Spade Maddock, Duke, Smiley and Pete. After he loses all his money, he leaves, only to run into another person trying to return Myra's purse. Realizing he has been conned, he threatens to go to the police ... unless they let him join them, telling them he has some profitable ideas.

He is as good as his word. Eventually, they are running a nightclub and casino, a perfect cover to scout the rich as burglary targets. Dan stages a car accident so a passing "doctor" can persuade Mrs. Marley to let him rest for a while in her nearby mansion. This gives Dan an opportunity to check out the place, so that they can break in later. More burglaries follow, but Dan decides to quit when a butler is killed during the latest one. However, Pete cracks under police interrogation and betrays the others; when the police come for them, Duke kills Pete and everyone flees. Dan and Myra head to Los Angeles.

Dan is picked up for questioning at the train station, so he gives his money to Myra for safekeeping. She then runs into Spade. When Dan telephones her to have her post his bail, Spade persuades her to go with him to Mexico instead. Dan is released anyway, for lack of evidence.

Broke, he runs away from what he mistakes for a policeman, only to discover his pursuer is actually hiring extras for a film. Dan gladly accepts $3 a day and a box lunch. On his fourth day of work, he meets star Lois Underwood and is surprised to find her friendly, even to a lowly extra. Meanwhile, National Studio head Ramick is looking for fresh, "rough and ready" faces, as the public is tiring of handsome stars. One of his executives suggests Dan. Dan helps his career along by writing himself hundreds of fan letters a week, and is soon a rising star.

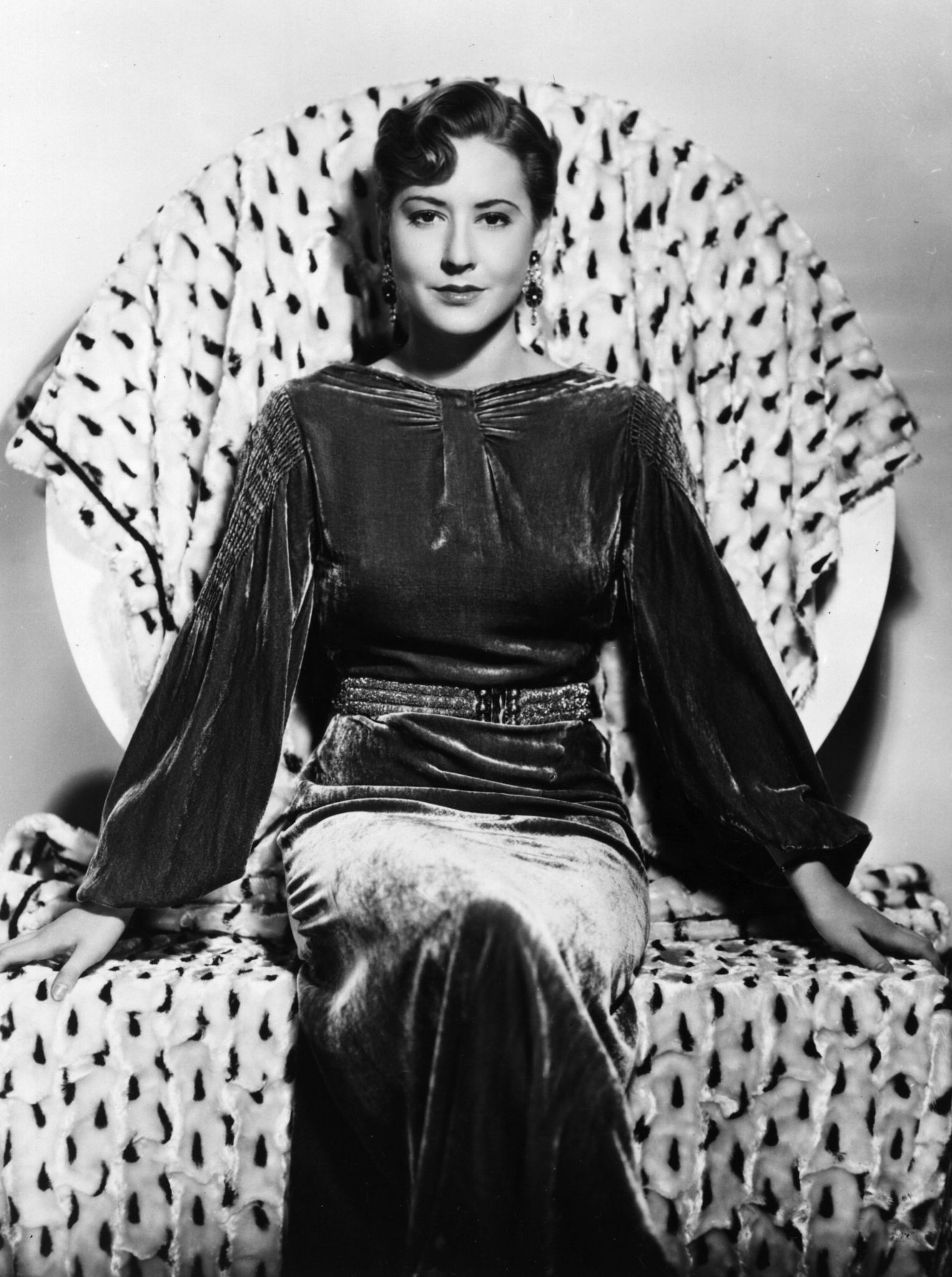
Mae Clarke

He and Lois start going out together. When he spots a critic who had written harsh things about Lois, he forces the man to literally eat his words, making him swallow the newspaper column, and warns him against panning Lois again. He then takes Lois home to see his new suite. However, when they unexpectedly find Myra in his bedroom, Lois leaves.

Dan throws Myra out, but she is not alone. Spade and their old gang want Dan to use his connections to get them inside stars' homes in preparation for robberies. Dan refuses, and offers them $10,000, all the money he has, to leave town and never come back. Spade takes it, but has no intention of departing. When burglaries start occurring using the modus operandi of Dan's old gang, the police suspect he is the ringleader. Dan tracks the crooks down after they rob Lois. He retrieves her jewels at gunpoint, but just as he is leaving, the police arrive. He is arrested, while the others get away.

In spite of the protests of the studio bigwigs, Lois adamantly intends to pay Dan's bail and stand by him. However, Spade worries that Dan will tell all he knows and has Myra bail Dan out so they can kill him. Myra tells Dan, but he already suspected as much and had the police tail them both. After a car chase and gunfight, the thieves are either dead or in custody, Dan is exonerated and he asks the authorities to guarantee leniency for Myra. Dan and Lois then fly to another state to get married without delay.

== Cast ==
- James Cagney as Dan Quigley
- Mae Clarke as Myra Gale
- Margaret Lindsay as Lois Underwood
- Leslie Fenton as Duke
- Douglass Dumbrille as Spade Maddock
- Russell Hopton as Smiley
- Raymond Hatton as Pete
- Henry O'Neill as Ramick
- Robert Elliott as Detective Joe Brannigan
- Marjorie Gateson as Mrs. Marley
- Willard Robertson as Detective Conroy
- William Davidson as Director Williams
- Edwin Maxwell as Jeffries
- Robert Homans as Jailer (uncredited)
- Olaf Hytten as Butler (uncredited)
- Sam McDaniel as Porter (uncredited)

== Release ==
The film received mixed reviews at the time of its release, as reflected in a collection of excerpts published in The Hollywood Reporter: the World-Telegram called it "a sprightly, more or less daring, thoroughly entertaining film," while less favorable reviewers dismissed it as "premeditated hokum" and "more a collection of jokes than a sustained narrative." Cagney's performance, however, was unanimously praised.
