= Kurzeme (disambiguation) =

Kurzeme is the Latvian name for Courland, a historical and cultural region of Latvia.

Kurzeme may also refer to:

- Latvian: Kurzemes guberņa, the Latvian name of Courland Governorate
- Kurzeme Planning Region, a planning region of Latvia
- Kurzeme Statistical Region, a statistical region of Latvia
- Kurzeme Province, a province in Republic of Latvia (1918–1940)
- Kurzeme District, Riga, an administrative district of Riga, Latvia
- Courland (Saeima constituency), constituency of the Saeima, the national legislature of Latvia, known as Kurzeme in Latvian

== See also ==
- Courland (disambiguation)
