= Lew Tyler's Wives =

1926 film

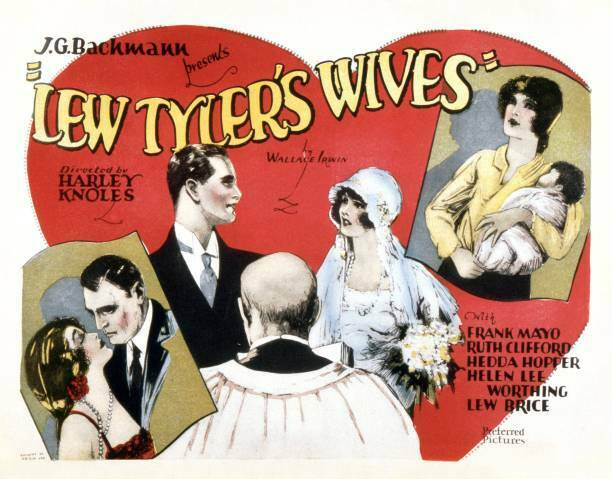
- Directed by: Harley Knoles
- Written by: Eugene Clifford; Arthur Hoerl
- Based on: Lew Tyler's Wives by Wallace Irwin
- Produced by: J. G. Bachmann
- Starring: Frank Mayo; Ruth Clifford; Hedda Hopper
- Cinematography: William Miller
- Distributed by: Preferred Pictures
- Release date: June 15, 1926
- Running time: 7 reels
- Country: United States
- Language: Silent (English intertitles)

Lew Tyler's Wives is a 1926 American silent drama film directed by Harley Knoles. Based on a novel by Wallace Irwin, it was produced and released by independent production company Preferred Pictures.

== Cast ==
- Frank Mayo as Lew Tyler
- Ruth Clifford as Jessie Winkler
- Hedda Hopper as Virginia Philips
- Helen Lee Worthing as Coleen Miles
- Lew Brice as Buzzy Mandelbush
- Robert T. Haines as Meech Garrick
- Warren Cook as Mr. Philips

== Preservation ==
With no prints of Lew Tyler's Wives located in any film archives, it is a lost film.
