= Cyprus Organisation for Standardisation =

- Κυπριακός Οργανισμός Τυποποίησης
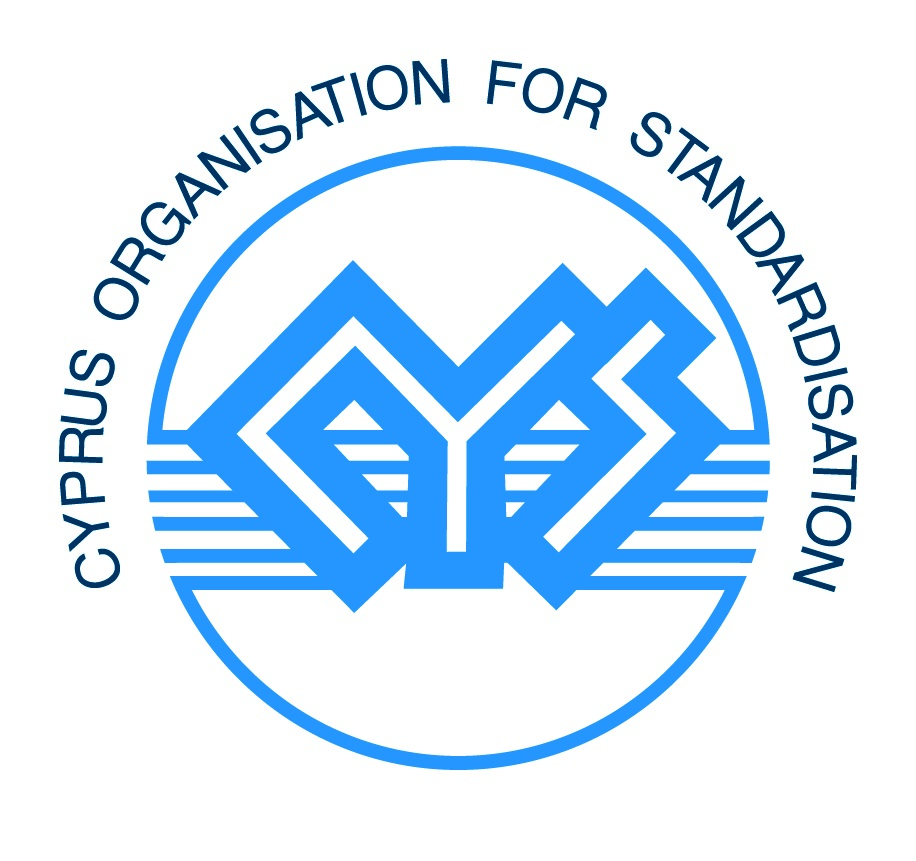
- Formation: 2005
- Type: Non-profit organisation operating under the government of Cyprus
- Headquarters: Nicosia, Cyprus
- Services: Production of standards and standards-related services
- Official languages: Greek; English
- Subsidiaries: Cyprus Certification Company
- Staff: 19 (2022)
- Website: www.cys.org.cy

CYS Board of Directors
- President: Demetris Vakis (OEB)
- Members: Lazaros Hadjiforados (CCCI); Dr. Photis Papadimas (CUT); Savvas Savva (MoECI); Maria Makkouli (MoF); Andreas Theodotou (ETEK); Marios Drousiotis (Consumers Ass.)
- Secretary: CYS General Manager

The Cyprus Organisation for Standardisation, or CYS (Greek: Κυπριακός Οργανισμός Τυποποίησης, romanized: Kypriakós Organismós Typopoíisis), is the national standardisation body of Cyprus, whose principal activity is the production of standards and the supply of standards-related services.

== Introduction ==
Since January 2005 it is autonomous from the Ministry of Commerce, Industry and Tourism, and operates under The 2002 Law for Standardisation, Accreditation and Technical Regulation.

The sole shareholder of CYS is the Minister of Finance who appoints, for a three-year term, its seven-member board of directors representing the major national stakeholders for quality issues: Ministry of Finance, Ministry of Commerce, Industry & Tourism, Employers Federation, Chamber of Commerce, Technical Chamber, Consumers Association and Academia.

CYS is a full member of European standards organisations (ESO's – CEN, CENELEC, ETSI) as well as broader standards organisations ISO and IEC.

Through its active participation in European and broader standardisation, CYS promotes Cypriot national interests through issuing and application of standards.

== History of standardisation ==
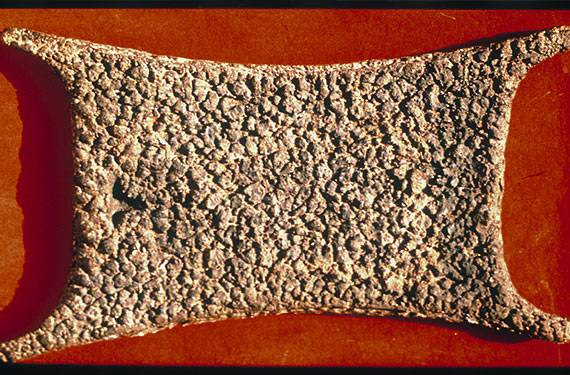
Sample of a Cyprus copper ingot

Archaeological evidence indicates the use of standards in Cyprus began in ancient times. Copper oxhide ingots (ingots of copper in the shape of a cow hide) were seen in Cyprus between the 16th and 12th centuries BC. During this period Cypriot copper manufacturers designed a standard shape for the copper ingots to facilitate handling, transport and storage. In addition, most of the ingots had a standard weight of 25 kg. Furthermore, Cypriot producers introduced a marking system using Cypro-Minoan script to indicate that the ingots were made from Cypriot mines that followed standard procedures of production and quality control.

Standards started being used nationally in the field of public works (road and building construction) at the beginning of the 20th century with the implementation of British standards during colonial administration and continued after the establishment of the Republic of Cyprus in 1960.

Standardisation was made more systematic in the mid-1970s with legislation (N.68/75) establishing the Cyprus Organisation for Standards and Control of Quality.

In 2002, through the Standardisation, Accreditation and Technical Information Law (N.156(I)/2002), the activities of standardisation have been allocated to the Cyprus Certification Company, which is now known as the Cyprus Organisation for Standardisation (CYS).

Examples of National Standards
- CYS 94:Part:1985: Specification for fresh halloumi
- CYS 92:1989: Specification for fresh milk
- CYS 301:2009: Operation and Management of Leisure Kart Facilities:Safety
- CYS 106:2012: Specification for Low density polyethylene (LDPE) pipes for agricultural applications
- CYS EN ISO 9001:2015: Quality management systems – Requirements
- CYS EN ISO 14001:2015: Environmental management systems – Requirements with guidance for use

== Cyprus national standards ==
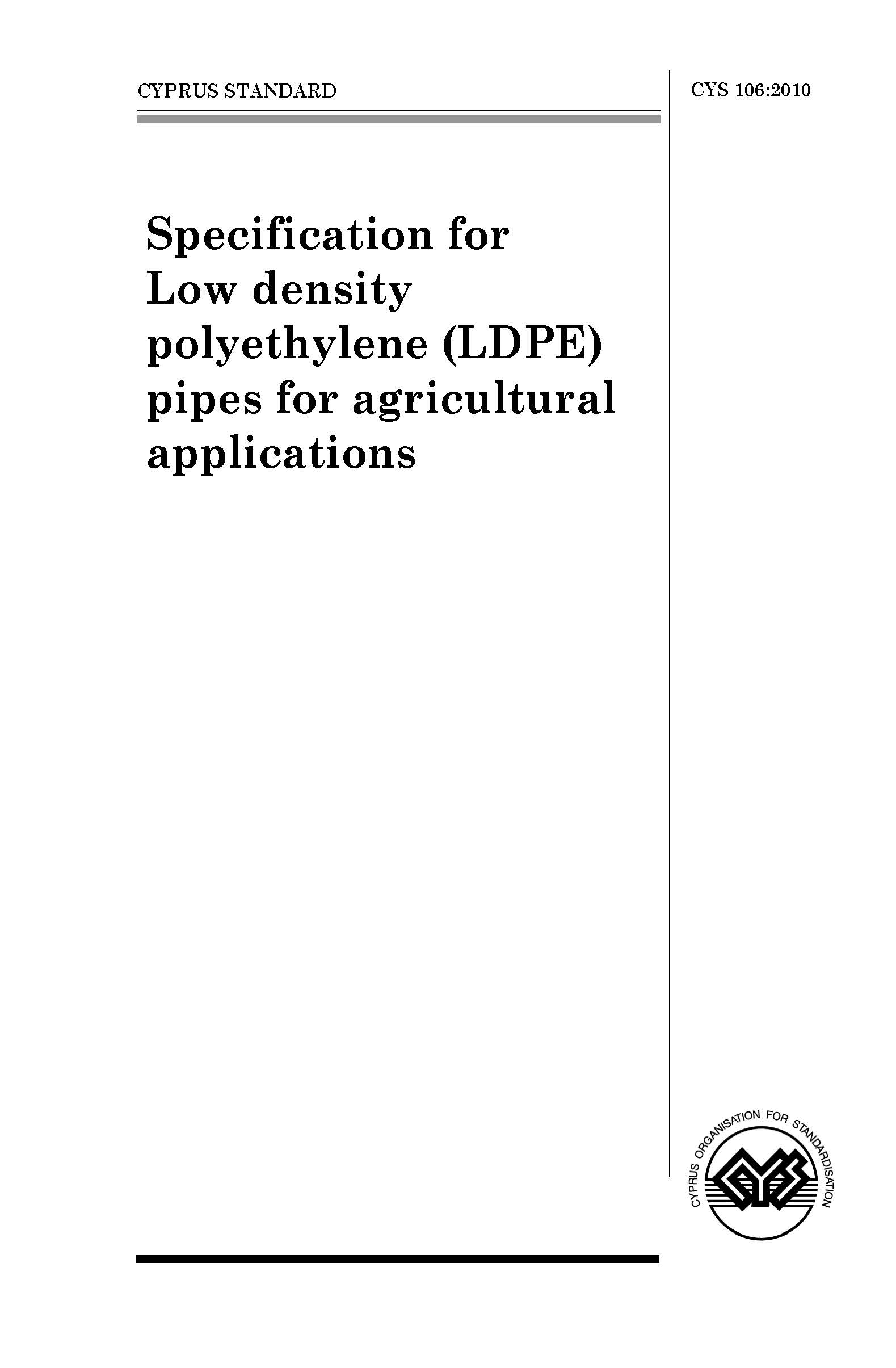
CYS 106 title page

CYS, as a full member of CEN, CENELEC and ETSI, has the obligation to adopt all European Norms (ENs) issued. Furthermore, in case an ISO or other national standard (e.g. BS, DIN etc.) is proven necessary for the national market CYS has the authority to adopt the standard as national, in collaboration with the issuing standardisation body.

In general, the name of a CYS standard shows its origin:

- CYS – Cypriot national standards, developed primarily for the specific needs of the Cypriot society and economy
- CYS EN – Adopted European standards published by CEN and CENELEC
- CYS ISO – Adopted ISO standards
- CYS IEC – Adopted IEC standards
- CYS EN ISO – ISO standards that have been adopted as European standards and therefore as Cypriot

There are only 31 valid purely national standards, as the majority were withdrawn due to the existence of equivalent or superseding European standards.

== CYS mirror and technical standardisation committees ==
In order to facilitate the dissemination and application of European standards, CYS has divided standardisation into 15 business sectors, each of which includes several sub-categories.

CYS sets up technical committees for the creation of national standards.

Business sectors
Number	Title
01	Agriculture, Food and Feed
02	Chemicals, Metals and Plastics
03	Construction and Buildings
04	Electrotechnical
05	Energy
06	Environment
07	Healthcare
08	Information Communication Technologies
09	Management, Quality and Conformity Assessment
10	Mechanical and Machines
11	Occupational and Consumers Health & Safety
12	Physical Security and Fire Safety
13	Services
14	Sustainability
15	Transport and Packaging

Technical committees
Designation	Title
CYS/TC 1	Building lime
CYS/TC 2	Aggregates
CYS/TC 4	Bricks
CYS/TC 5	Natural stones
CYS/TC 6	Concrete
CYS/TC 8	Plastics piping systems
CYS/TC 13	Solar thermal systems
CYS/TC 14	Precast concrete products
CYS/TC 15	Concrete reinforcement steel
CYS/TC 16	Playground, waterparks and go-karts safety
CYS/TC 17	Asphalt concrete
CYS/TC 18	Eurocodes
CYS/TC 20	Doors and windows
CYS/TC 21	Cyprus Lefkara embroidery – Lefkaritiko
CYS/TC 22	Hydrocarbons
CYS/TC 23	Translation and adoption of the BS 7671
CYS/TC 24	Gender equality in the workplace
CYS/TC 25	Fythkiotiko yfanto
CYS/TC 26	Circular plastic products
CYS/TC 27	Climate neutrality – carbon sequestration from tree planting
CYS/TC 28	Mountaineering and hiking trails
CYS/TC 29	Climate neutral cities and communities

Both, mirror and technical committees monitor their respective standardisation activities at the international and European levels and consult CYS accordingly, e.g. if standards need to be withdrawn, the preparation of national annexes or the development of supplementary standards.

To facilitate the operation of the committees, CYS has been working with ISO to provide an electronic platform, Livelink, where members can exchange information and manage the respective committees at minimum effort and cost.

== Centre for information and customer service ==
The CYS centre for information and customer service provides full access to all international, European, and national standards and is open to the public in order to provide all relevant information.

It offers the possibility of reading, studying and purchasing standards. Furthermore, it provides free access to users in international databases of standards like Perinorm.

CYS makes available for sale – in hardcopy and electronic form – all the standards of many organisations: the global ISO and IEC, the European CEN and CENELEC, and the national BSI, ΕΛΟΤ, CYS, and DIN.
