= Gilbert Kurland =

American sound engineer

- Born: November 28, 1904; Minneapolis, Minnesota, United States
- Died: February 2, 1978 (aged 73); Los Angeles, California, United States
- Occupations: Sound engineer, production manager
- Years active: 1931–1970

Gilbert Kurland (November 28, 1904 – February 26, 1978) was an American sound engineer and production manager. He was nominated for an Academy Award in the category Sound Recording for the films Imitation of Life (1934) and Bride of Frankenstein (1935).

== Biography ==
Kurland started work at Universal in the early 1920s, serving as second assistant director (by 1923), first assistant director (1927) and production manager of sound sequences (1930), before becoming head of sound and music at Universal in 1932. In 1938, he joined MGM as first assistant director and subsequently unit production manager (1941–45). He then rejoined Universal first as assistant production manager and then as studio production manager (1951–57). He then served as production manager for Hecht-Hill-Lancaster Productions. In 1964–65 he was production manager on two films for Universal, and he then served as production manager for Hanna-Barbera before retiring. A collection of his papers from 1927 to 1969, covering over 40 produced films as well as some unproduced ones, are archived as a special collection of the Margaret Herrick Library.

== Selected filmography ==
- Imitation of Life (1934)
- Bride of Frankenstein (1935)
- The Ziegfeld Follies (1946)
