= Mae Clarke =

American actress (1910–1992)

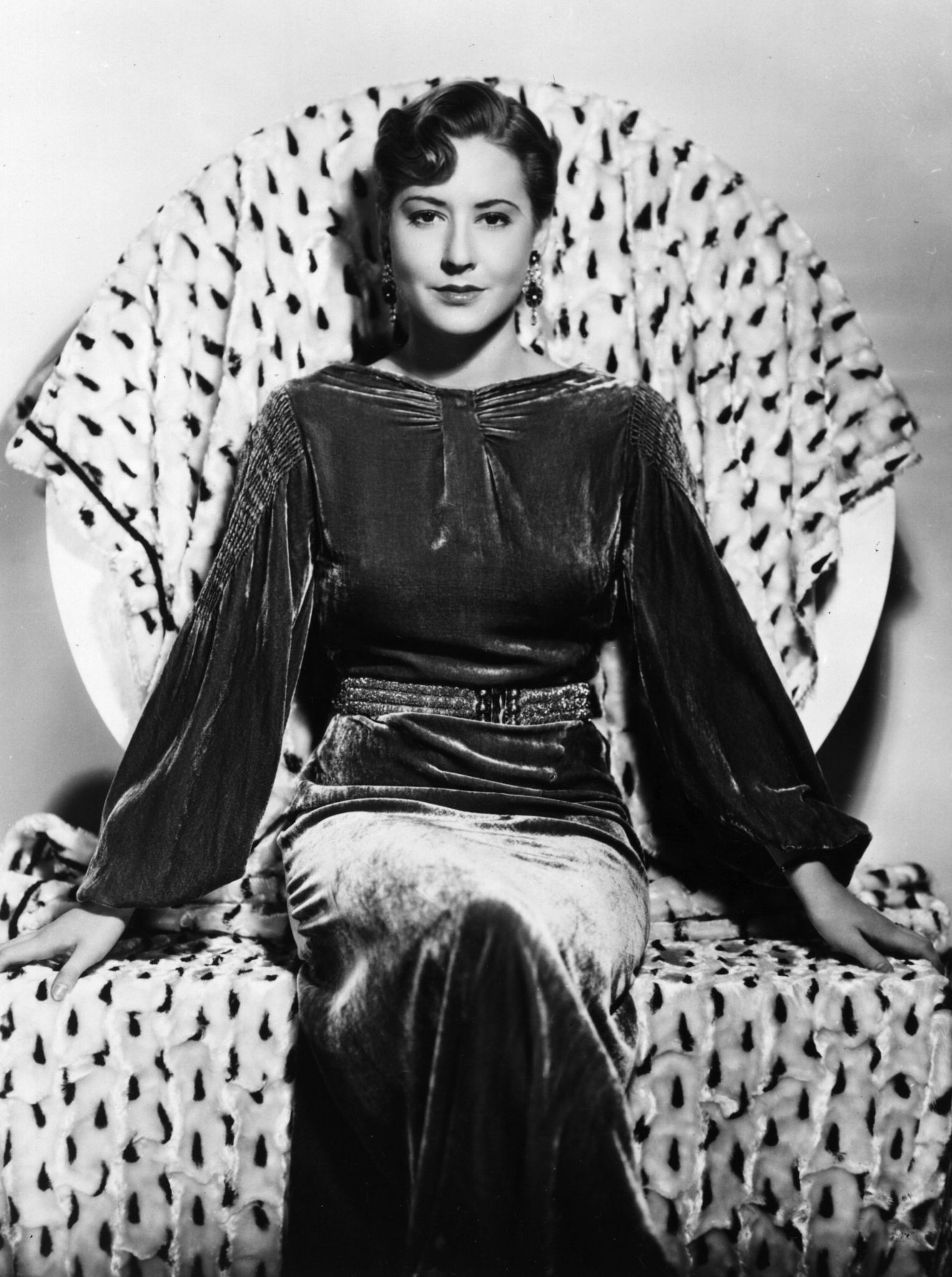
- Clarke in 1932
- Born: Violet Mary Klotz; August 16, 1910; Philadelphia, Pennsylvania, U.S.
- Died: April 29, 1992 (aged 81); Woodland Hills, California, U.S.
- Resting place: Valhalla Memorial Park Cemetery; North Hollywood, California
- Occupations: Actress, singer
- Years active: 1926–1970
- Spouses: Lew Brice (m. 1928; div. 1930) Stevens Bancroft (m. 1937; div. 1940): Herbert Langdon (m. 1946; div. 1947 or 1948)

Mae Clarke (born Violet Mary Klotz; August 16, 1910 – April 29, 1992) was an American actress. She is widely remembered for playing Henry Frankenstein's bride Elizabeth, who is chased by Boris Karloff in Frankenstein, and for being on the receiving end of James Cagney's halved grapefruit in The Public Enemy. Both films were released in 1931.

== Early life ==
Mae Clarke was born in Philadelphia. Her father was a theatre organist. She studied dancing as a child and began on stage in vaudeville and also worked in night clubs. In 1922, at the age of 12, she marched in the Miss America Pageant Parade on the Atlantic City Boardwalk dressed as a lobster. She returned to the Boardwalk Parade again in 1940 as a featured guest, riding atop a white limousine convertible.

== Career ==
Clarke started her professional career as a dancer in New York City, sharing a room with Barbara Stanwyck. She starred in many films for Universal Studios, including the original screen version of The Front Page (1931) and the first sound version of Frankenstein (1931), with Boris Karloff. Clarke played the role of Elizabeth, Henry Frankenstein's fiancée, who is attacked by the Monster (Boris Karloff) on her wedding day.

1931's The Public Enemy contained one of cinema's more famous, and frequently parodied, scenes, in which James Cagney pushes a half grapefruit into Clarke's face, then goes out to pick up Jean Harlow.

Cagney mashes a grapefruit into Mae Clarke's face in a famous scene from Cagney's breakthrough movie, The Public Enemy (1931)

The film was so popular that it ran 24 hours per day at a movie theatre in Times Square upon its initial release. Four months after the premiere, The Hollywood Reporter informed readers that Clarke's ex-husband Lew Brice claimed to have seen the film more than 20 times, and at least twice per week, and that Brice "says he goes to see the scene wherein Mae Clarke gets hit in the eye with a grapefruit—and that it's a plazure!" (Note: In an article published in Variety more than two years after the film's release, Brice's total number of claimed viewings had somehow dwindled to eight. In James Cagney's 1976 autobiography, he claims that Clarke's disgruntled ex—mistakenly dubbed Monte Brice—soon had the grapefruit scene timed so as to arrive shortly beforehand and depart immediately thereafter.)

Clarke appeared as Myra Deauville in the 1931 pre-Code version of Waterloo Bridge. In the film, she portrays a young American woman who is forced by circumstance into a life of prostitution in World War I London. Both the film and Clarke's performance were well received by the critics.

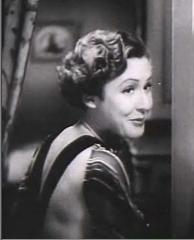
A frame from the trailer for Lady Killer (1933)

Clarke also appeared in the modest pre-Code Universal film Night World (1932), with Lew Ayres, Boris Karloff, Hedda Hopper, and George Raft. In 1933, she was the female lead in Fast Workers, John Gilbert's last film as a contracted MGM star, and Lady Killer with James Cagney and Margaret Lindsay. The same year, she and actor Phillips Holmes were in a single-car accident that left Clarke with a broken jaw and facial scarring.

Those injuries did not end her film career, and she remained a leading lady for most of the 1930s. She was, though, increasingly cast in productions with lower budgets that lacked the status of her earlier films. By 1940, Clarke slipped into supporting roles, although she did have a few last leading roles later in the decade, notably as the heroine in the Republic serial King of the Rocket Men (1949). In the 1950s and 1960s, Clarke played uncredited bit parts in several notable films, including Singin' in the Rain, The Great Caruso, and Thoroughly Modern Millie. Her last screen appearance was in the 1970 film Watermelon Man.

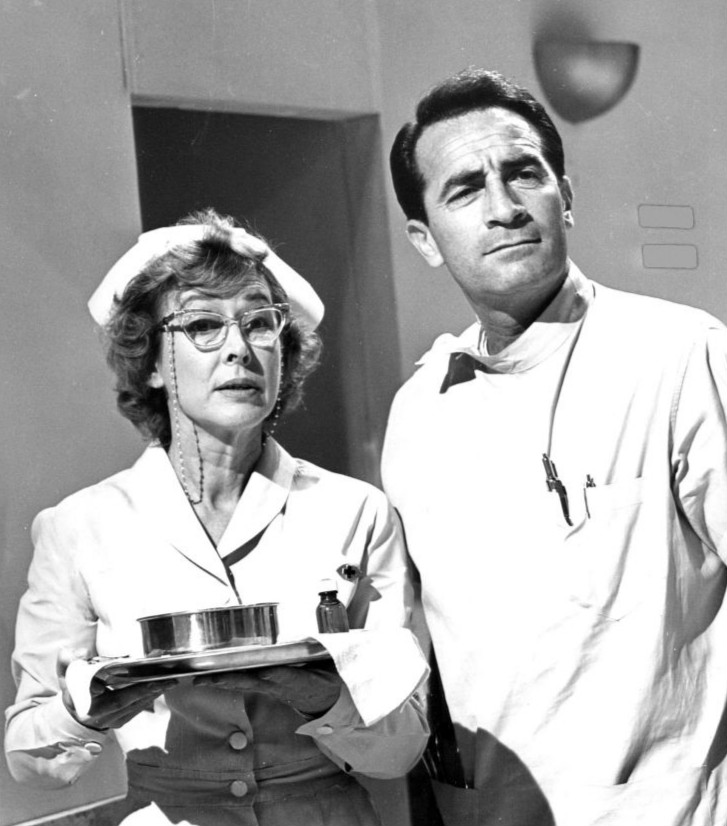
Clarke with fellow actor John Beradino in the daytime drama General Hospital (1963)

On television, Clarke appeared in many episodic series, including General Hospital, Perry Mason and Batman. Clarke retired in 1970 and taught drama.

== Personal life and death ==
Clarke was married and divorced three times: to Fanny Brice's brother Lew Brice, Stevens Bancroft, and Herbert Langdon. She did not have any children.

In later years Clarke resided at the Motion Picture & Television Country House and Hospital in Woodland Hills, California. Clarke died of cancer on April 29, 1992, at age 81. She is buried in Valhalla Memorial Park Cemetery.

== Selected filmography ==
=== Features ===
- Big Time (1929) - Lily Clark
- Nix on Dames (1929) - Jackie Lee
- The Fall Guy (1930) - Bertha Quinlan
- The Dancers (1930) - Maxine
- Men on Call (1930) - Helen Gordon / Helen Harding
- The Front Page (1931) - Molly Molloy
- The Public Enemy (1931) - Kitty (uncredited)
- The Good Bad Girl (1931) - Marcia Cameron
- Waterloo Bridge (1931) - Myra
- Reckless Living (1931) - Bee
- Frankenstein (1931) - Elizabeth
- Three Wise Girls (1932) - Gladys Kane
- The Final Edition (1932) - Ann Woodman
- Impatient Maiden (1932) - Ruth Robbins
- Night World (1932) - Ruth Taylor
- Flaming Gold (1932) - Claire Gordon
- Breach of Promise (1932) - Hattie Pugmire
- The Penguin Pool Murder (1932) - Gwen Parker
- As the Devil Commands (1932) - Jane Chase
- Parole Girl (1933) - Sylvia Day
- Fast Workers (1933) - Mary
- Turn Back the Clock (1933) - Mary Gimlet / Mary Wright
- Penthouse (1933) - Mimi Montagne
- Lady Killer (1933) - Myra Gale
- Nana (1934) - Satin
- This Side of Heaven (1934) - Jane Turner
- Let's Talk It Over (1934) - Pat Rockland
- The Man with Two Faces (1934) - Daphne Flowers
- Silk Hat Kid (1935) - Laura Grant
- The Daring Young Man (1935) - Martha Allen
- Hitch Hike Lady (1935) - Judith Martin
- The House of a Thousand Candles (1936) - Carol Vincent
- Hearts in Bondage (1936) - Constance Jordan
- Wild Brian Kent (1936) - Betty Prentice
- Hats Off (1936) - Jo Allen
- Great Guy (1936) - Janet Henry
- Trouble in Morocco (1937) - Linda Lawrence
- Outlaws of the Orient (1937) - Joan Manning
- Women in War (1940) - Gail Halliday
- Sailors on Leave (1941) - Gwen
- Flying Tigers (1942) - Verna Bales
- Lady from Chungking (1942) - Lavara
- And Now Tomorrow (1944) - Receptionist (uncredited)
- Here Come the Waves (1944) - Ens. Kirk (uncredited)
- Kitty (1945) - Molly
- Reaching from Heaven (1948) - Dorothy Gram
- Daredevils of the Clouds (1948) - Kay Cameron
- Gun Runner (1949) - Kate Diamond
- Streets of San Francisco (1949) - Hazel Logan
- King of the Rocket Men (1949, Serial) - Glenda Thomas
- The Yellow Cab Man (1950) - Casualty Company Secretary (uncredited)
- The Reformer and the Redhead (1950) - Counter Lady with Change for a Quarter (uncredited)
- Annie Get Your Gun (1950) - Mrs. Adams, Party Guest (uncredited)
- The Skipper Surprised His Wife (1950) - Clubwoman (uncredited)
- Duchess of Idaho (1950) - Betty - Flower Shop Saleslady (uncredited)
- Mrs. O'Malley and Mr. Malone (1950) - Train Passenger (uncredited)
- Three Guys Named Mike (1951) - Convair Passenger (uncredited)
- Inside Straight (1951) - Nurse (uncredited)
- Mr. Imperium (1951) - Minor Role (uncredited)
- Royal Wedding (1951) - Telephone Operator #1 (uncredited)
- The Great Caruso (1951) - Woman (uncredited)
- The People Against O'Hara (1951) - Receptionist (uncredited)
- The Unknown Man (1951) - Stella's Friend (uncredited)
- Callaway Went Thataway (1951) - Mother on Train (uncredited)
- Love Is Better Than Ever (1952) - Mrs. Island (uncredited)
- Singin' in the Rain (1952) - Hairdresser (uncredited)
- Carbine Williams (1952) - Courtroom Spectator (uncredited)
- Skirts Ahoy! (1952) - Miss LaValle (uncredited)
- Pat and Mike (1952) - Golfer (uncredited)
- Holiday for Sinners (1952) - Minor Role (uncredited)
- Fearless Fagan (1952) - Hospital Telephone Operator (uncredited)
- The Miracle of Our Lady of Fatima (1952) - Townswoman (uncredited)
- Horizons West (1952) - Mrs. Jane Tarleton
- Thunderbirds (1952) - Mrs. Jones
- Because of You (1952) - Miss Peach / Nurse Peachie
- Confidentially Connie (1953) - Happy Shopper (uncredited)
- Magnificent Obsession (1954) - Mrs. Miller
- Women's Prison (1955) - Matron Saunders
- Not as a Stranger (1955) - Nurse Odell
- Wichita (1955) - Mrs McCoy.
- I Died a Thousand Times (1955) - Mabel Baughman (uncredited)
- Come Next Spring (1956) - Myrtle
- Mohawk (1956) - Minikah
- The Catered Affair (1956) - Saleswoman (uncredited)
- The Desperados Are in Town (1956) - Jane Kesh
- Ride the High Iron (1956) - Mrs. Vanders
- Decision at Sundown (1957)
- Voice in the Mirror (1958) - Mrs. Robbins
- Ask Any Girl (1959) - Woman on Train (uncredited)
- A Big Hand for the Little Lady (1966) - Mrs. Craig
- Thoroughly Modern Millie (1967) - Secretary (uncredited)
- Watermelon Man (1970) - Old Woman (uncredited)

=== Short subjects ===
- Screen Snapshots (1932, Documentary short) - Herself
- Screen Snapshots Series 16, No. 7 (1937, Documentary short) - Herself
