= Cys Kurland =

South African soccer player

Personal information
- Full name: Laicy Cecil Kurland
- Place of birth: South Africa

International career
Years	Team	Apps	(Gls)
1947	South Africa	7	(0)

Laicy Cecil "Cys" Kurland was a South African international footballer. He won seven caps for the South African national side in 1947. Kurland was Jewish.
