= James Donlan =

American actor (1888–1938)

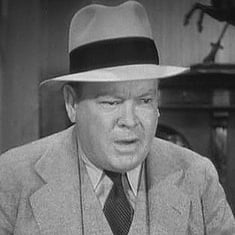
- Donlan in 1934
- Born: July 23, 1888; San Francisco, California, USA
- Died: June 7, 1938 (aged 49); Los Angeles, California, USA
- Occupation: Actor
- Spouse: Theresa Mollot Donlan
- Children: Yolande Donlan (daughter)

James Donlan (July 23, 1888 – June 7, 1938) was an American actor. Born in San Francisco, California, Donlan appeared in 107 films between 1929 and 1939. He was the father of actress Yolande Donlan.

In his early career Donlan was the actor-manager of a theatre company called The Permanent Players. While touring in Winnipeg, Canada he met singer Theresa Mollot who joined his company and moved to New York with him.

Donlan performed in several plays in New York City, including Home Again (1918) and The Lady Killer (1924). He also worked in Silent movies, including with actor-writer J.C. Nugent.

By the time Donlan got his first part in Talking Pictures, in Big News (1929), he had moved from New York to Hollywood, California with his wife Theresa and his child Yolande.

A character actor, Donlan played in scenes opposite several stars of the Golden Age of Hollywood including Mae West in Belle of the Nineties (1934) and Harold Lloyd in Professor Beware (1938).

On June 7, 1938, Donlan died, aged 49, from a heart attack.

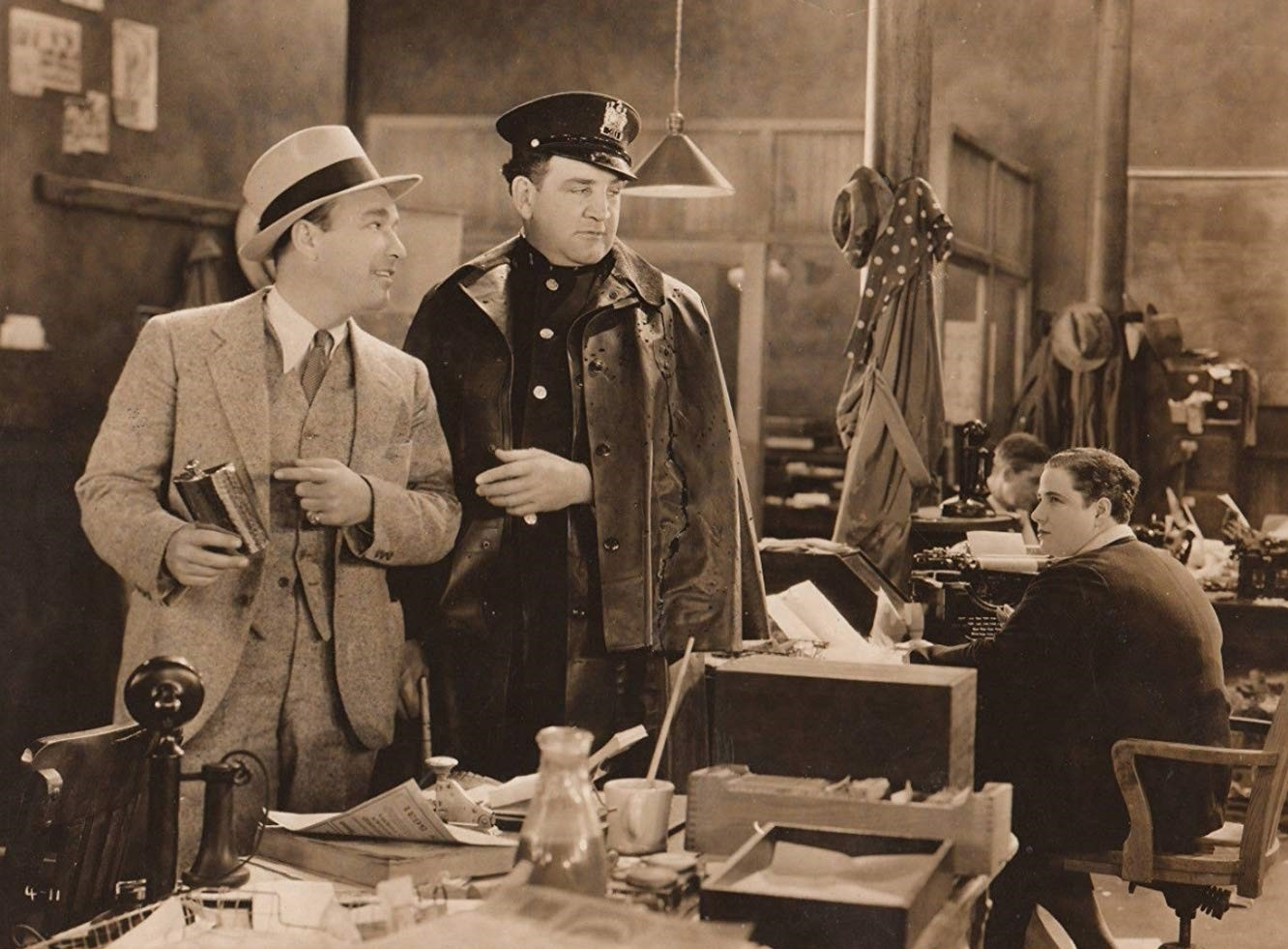
Robert Armstrong and Tom Kennedy in Big News 1929

== Selected filmography ==
- Big News (1929) - Deke
- Wise Girls (1929) - Ben Wade
- The Bishop Murder Case (1930) - Ernest Heath
- Beau Bandit (1930) - Buck - Posse Member
- The Fall Guy (1930) - The Bill Collector
- The Sins of the Children (1930) - Bide Taylor
- Night Work (1930) - Mr. McEvoy (uncredited)
- Danger Lights (1930) - Picnic Barker (uncredited)
- Remote Control (1930) - Blodgett
- Mothers Cry (1930) - City Editor (uncredited)
- The Painted Desert (1931) - Steve - Ore Wagon #2 Shotgun Rider (uncredited)
- Dance, Fools, Dance (1931) - Clinton (uncredited)
- The Front Page (1931) - Reporter (uncredited)
- Daybreak (1931) - Drunk Inviting Laura to Dance (uncredited)
- The Good Bad Girl (1931) - Police Sgt. Donovan
- A Free Soul (1931) - Reporter (uncredited)
- Sporting Blood (1931) - Jim, a Trainer (uncredited)
- Five Star Final (1931) - Reporter in Speakeasy (uncredited)
- Men of Chance (1931) - Clark
- The Final Edition (1932) - Freddie
- Are You Listening? (1932) - Butch (uncredited)
- Huddle (1932) - Heckler at Game (uncredited)
- Is My Face Red? (1932) - Reporter (uncredited)
- Crooner (1932) - Non-Fan with Radio (uncredited)
- Back Street (1932) - Profhero
- Thirteen Women (1932) - Mike - the Detective (uncredited)
- Air Mail (1932) - Passenger Passing Out Cigars (uncredited)
- Madison Square Garden (1932) - Sports Reporter (uncredited)
- The Conquerors (1932) - Joe - Stockbroker (uncredited)
- The Death Kiss (1932) - Max Hill (uncredited)
- The Penguin Pool Murder (1932) - Fink
- The Half-Naked Truth (1932) - Lou - Press Agent (uncredited)
- They Just Had to Get Married (1932) - Clark
- 20,000 Years in Sing Sing (1932) - Reporter #1 (uncredited)
- What! No Beer? (1933) - Al (uncredited)
- Mystery of the Wax Museum (1933) - Morgue Attendant (uncredited)
- Grand Slam (1933) - Reporter with False Reno News (uncredited)
- Central Airport (1933) - Havana Driver (uncredited)
- The Working Man (1933) - Hartland Co. Man (uncredited)
- Hell Below (1933) - Seaman Muller (uncredited)
- The Nuisance (1933) - Photographer (uncredited)
- The Life of Jimmy Dolan (1933) - Man Offering Jimmy a Drink (uncredited)
- Heroes for Sale (1933) - Laundry Cashier (uncredited)
- The Mayor of Hell (1933) - Sam (uncredited)
- College Humor (1933) - Marcus Lafflin
- I Love That Man (1933) - Reporter (uncredited)
- Pilgrimage (1933) - Barber (uncredited)
- The Avenger (1933) - Durant
- Doctor Bull (1933) - Harry Weems - Supporter #3 for Dr. Bull (uncredited)
- I Loved a Woman (1933) - Voting Returns Announcer (uncredited)
- Only Yesterday (1933) - (uncredited)
- College Coach (1933) - Reporter (uncredited)
- From Headquarters (1933) - Relaxing Reporter (uncredited)
- Design for Living (1933) - Fat Man with Ring (uncredited)
- Hi Nellie! (1934) - Evans (uncredited)
- Dark Hazard (1934) - Man Advising Jim at Dog Track (uncredited)
- I've Got Your Number (1934) - Mr. Talley (uncredited)
- Gambling Lady (1934) - Joe - Syndicate Lawyer (uncredited)
- A Very Honorable Guy (1934) - Mr. O'Toole
- Now I'll Tell (1934) - Honey Smith
- Midnight Alibi (1934) - Marty - the Bail Bondsman (uncredited)
- Paris Interlude (1934) - Jones - Times Reporter (uncredited)
- The Cat's-Paw (1934) - Red - the Reporter
- Belle of the Nineties (1934) - Kirby
- Wake Up and Dream (1934) - Jim (uncredited)
- Babbitt (1934) - Maxwell, Reisling's Attorney (uncredited)
- The Man Who Reclaimed His Head (1934) - Danglas - Man in Theatre Box (uncredited)
- Romance in Manhattan (1935) - Mr. Harris - Cab Manager (uncredited)
- Under Pressure (1935) - Corky
- The Whole Town's Talking (1935) - Detective Sergeant Howe
- Life Begins at 40 (1935) - Farmer (uncredited)
- Traveling Saleslady (1935) - Andy McNeill
- The Case of the Curious Bride (1935) - Detective Fritz
- Go Into Your Dance (1935) - Mr. A.J. Squires (uncredited)
- In Caliente (1935) - Swanson (uncredited)
- The Girl from 10th Avenue (1935) - First Detective (uncredited)
- The Murder Man (1935) - Bartender #2 (uncredited)
- The Daring Young Man (1935) - Captain of the Prison Guard (uncredited)
- Hot Tip (1935) - Bill - Racetrack Bettor (uncredited)
- Here Comes the Band (1935) - Joe (uncredited)
- Redheads on Parade (1935) - Minor Role (uncredited)
- Dr. Socrates (1935) - Salesman in Car (uncredited)
- Thanks a Million (1935) - Diner Counterman (uncredited)
- Ah, Wilderness! (1935) - Salesman in Bar (uncredited)
- We're Only Human (1935) - Detective Casey (uncredited)
- Exclusive Story (1936) - Managing Editor (uncredited)
- Boulder Dam (1936) - Nightclub Manager (uncredited)
- Murder on a Bridle Path (1936) - Detective Kane
- The Ex-Mrs. Bradford (1936) - Taxi Driver (uncredited)
- The Crime of Dr. Forbes (1936) - Coroner (uncredited)
- Crash Donovan (1936) - Smokey
- The Plot Thickens (1936) - Jim
- A Family Affair (1937) - 'Daily Star' Reporter (uncredited)
- Oh, Doctor (1937) - Mr. Stoddard (uncredited)
- This Is My Affair (1937) - Reporter
- Hotel Haywire (1937) - Swanlee (uncredited)
- It Happened in Hollywood (1937) - Shorty
- Music for Madame (1937) - Suspect with Cold (uncredited)
- Borrowing Trouble (1937) - Casey (uncredited)
- Everybody Sing (1938) - Stage Doorman (uncredited)
- Test Pilot (1938) - Photographer (uncredited)
- Professor Beware (1938) - Reporter at Museum (uncredited)
- The Crowd Roars (1938) - Announcer at Smoker (uncredited)
- Babes in Arms (1939) - Fred (uncredited) (final film role)

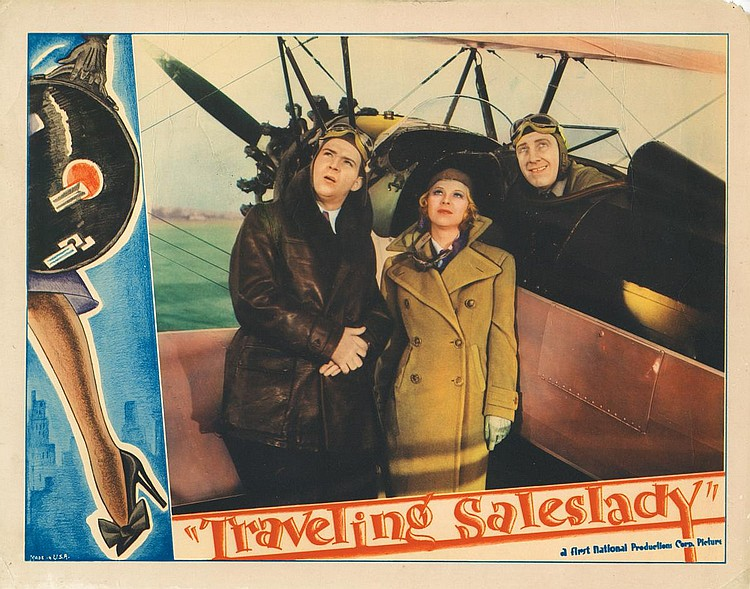
James Donlan with Glenda Farrell in Traveling Saleslady (1935)
