= Men Without Names =

1935 film by Ralph Murphy

- Directed by: Ralph Murphy
- Screenplay by: Kubec Glasmon; Howard J. Green
- Story by: Dale Van Every; Marguerite Roberts
- Produced by: Albert Lewis
- Starring: Fred MacMurray; Madge Evans; David Holt; Lynne Overman; Elizabeth Patterson; J. C. Nugent; Grant Mitchell; John Wray
- Cinematography: Ben F. Reynolds; Joseph Ruttenberg
- Edited by: Stuart Heisler
- Music by: John Leipold
- Production company: Paramount Pictures
- Distributed by: Paramount Pictures
- Release date: June 29, 1935
- Running time: 66 minutes
- Country: United States
- Language: English

Men Without Names is a 1935 American crime film directed by Ralph Murphy and written by Kubec Glasmon and Howard J. Green. The film stars Fred MacMurray, Madge Evans, David Holt, Lynne Overman, Elizabeth Patterson, J. C. Nugent, Grant Mitchell and John Wray. The film was released on June 29, 1935, by Paramount Pictures.

== Cast ==
- Fred MacMurray as Richard Hood / Richard 'Dick' Grant
- Madge Evans as Helen Sherwood
- David Holt as David Sherwood
- Lynne Overman as Gabby Lambert
- Elizabeth Patterson as Aunt Ella
- J. C. Nugent as Major Newcomb
- Grant Mitchell as Andrew Webster
- John Wray as Sam 'Red' Hammond
- Leslie Fenton as Monk
- Clyde Dilson as Butch
- Herbert Rawlinson as Crawford
- Arthur Aylesworth as Drew
- Dean Jagger as Jones
- Harry Tyler as Steve
- Helen Shipman as Becky
- George Lloyd as Louis
- Hilda Vaughn as Nurse Simpson
- Russ Clark as Adams
- Frank Shannon as Leahy
- Paul Fix as The Kid
- Helen Brown as Dorothy Lambert
- Creighton Hale as Groom
- Ivan Miller as FBI Agent
- Buddy Roosevelt as FBI Agent
- Stanley Andrews as Jim
- Sam Godfrey as Reporter
