= Richard Carle =

American actor (1871–1941)

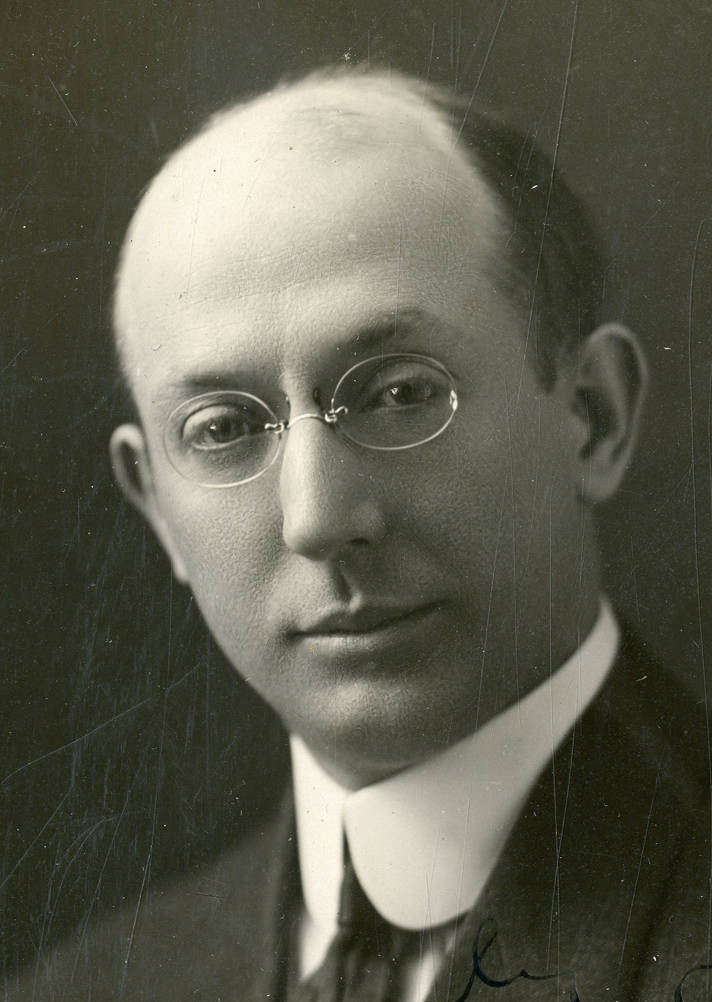
- Carle in 1909
- Born: Charles Nicholas Carleton; July 7, 1871; Somerville, Massachusetts, United States
- Died: June 28, 1941 (aged 69); North Hollywood, California, United States
- Occupation: Actor
- Years active: 1888–1941

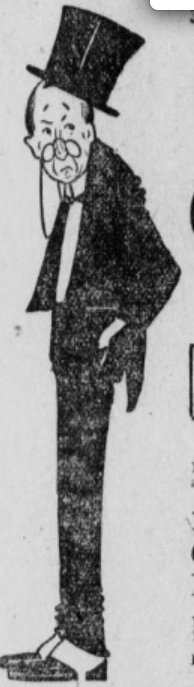
Carle as drawn in a newspaper advertisement, 1909

Richard Carle (born Charles Nicholas Carleton; July 7, 1871 – June 28, 1941) was an American stage and film actor as well as a playwright, lyricist, and stage director. He began performing in amateur shows in the late 1880s. In his early career he was a popular performer in musical comedies on Broadway; working regularly on the New York stage from 1891 through 1922. On screen, he appeared in one silent film in 1915 but then resumed performing on stage until moving to California in 1924. From this point on he was predominantly a film actor in both silent and sound films, making more than 100 films as a character actor from the mid 1920s until his death in 1941. During that period he occasionally returned to the stage, most notably in the original Broadway production of Cole Porter's The New Yorkers in the 1930-1931 season.

== Life and career ==
Richard Carle was born in Somerville, Massachusetts on July 7, 1871. In his early career he performed mainly in local amateur theatricals. He was a member of Winter Hill Universalist Church in Somerville, and in 1888 performed in a minstrel show put on by the young men of the church. By 1889 he was touring in New England as an impersonator and humorist.

Carle made his Broadway debut on September 20, 1891 at the Bijou Theatre in a minor role in Niobe. This was followed by a string of supporting roles in musicals, including Cranks (1892), A Mad Bargain (1892, as Worthington), A Washington Sport (1893, as Washington Strutt), Excelsior, Jr. (1895, as Tomagnio), and The Lady Slavey (1896, as Lord Lavender). After this he rose into leading parts, and had a long career as a popular star on Broadway in mainly musical theatre. Some important early successes included the roles of the Duke of Marlinspike in Sydney Rosenfeld's A Round of Pleasure (1897, [Knickerbocker Theatre) and Heliodoris in Sidney Jones's A Greek Slave (1899, Herald Square Theatre). On the London stage he portrayed J. Offenbach Gaggs in The Casino Girl (1900) and Algy Cuffs in The Belle of Bohemia (1901).

During the early 20th century Carle was also active as playwright and lyricist for the stage. Some Broadway shows for which he both authored the libretti and starred in included Mam'selle 'Awkins (1900), The Ladies Paradise (1901), The Tenderfoot (1904), The Maid and the Mummy (1904), The Mayor of Tokio (1905), The Spring Chicken (1906), The Hurdy-Gurdy Girl (1907), Mary's Lamb (1908), The Boy and the Girl (1909), and Jumping Jupiter (1911). After this he contributed lyrics to and starred in The Broadway Whirl (1921), but otherwise was not active as a writer for Broadway.

Other Broadway productions for which Carle was an actor, included The Girl from Montmartre (1912-1913), The Doll Girl (1913), The Censor and the Dramatists (1913), 90 in the Shade (1915), The Cohan Revue of 1916, Words and Music (1917-1918), The Broadway Whirl (1921), and Adrienne (1923). After an absent period from the New York stage, he returned to Broadway in 1930-1931 as Dr. Windham Wentworth in Cole Porter's The New Yorkers.

On screen, Carle made his film debut in the silent film Mary's Lamb (1915), and then did not return to making movies until 1924 when he moved from New York to California. He appeared in more than 100 films as a character actor; successfully making the transition from silent to sound film. He was filming the movie Almost an Angel (later renamed It Started with Eve) when he suffered a heart attack. On June 28, 1941 he died in North Hollywood, California. Walter Catlett replaced him in It Started with Eve.

Carle married twice, first to Ella Samantha Clifford, with whom he had one child, and then to Laura Casner following Clifford's death.

== Selected filmography ==
- Mary's Lamb (1915) - Leander Lamb
- The Mad Marriage (1925)
- Zander the Great (1925) - Mr. Pepper
- The Coming of Amos (1925) - David Fontenay
- Eve's Leaves (1926) - Richard Stanley
- The Understanding Heart (1927) - Sheriff Bentley
- Soft Cushions (1927) - The Slave Dealer
- The Fleet's In (1928) - Judge Hartley
- While the City Sleeps (1928) - Wally
- Habeas Corpus (1928, Short) - Professor Padilla
- It Can Be Done (1929) - Watson
- Madame X (1929) - Perissard
- His Glorious Night (1929) - Count Albert
- So This Is College (1929) - Entomology Professor (uncredited)
- Brothers (1929) - Thomas Blackwood
- The Grand Parade (1930) - Rand
- A Lady to Love (1930) - Postman
- Free and Easy (1930) - Eunuch Crowning Elmer (uncredited)
- The Unholy Three (1930) - Sideshow Barker (uncredited)
- Estrellados (1930) - Eunuch (uncredited)
- Sin Takes a Holiday (1930) - Minister (uncredited)
- Flying High (1931) - Hotel Manager (uncredited)
- Fireman, Save My Child (1932) - Dan Toby
- One Hour with You (1932) - Henri Dornier - Private Detective
- The Washington Masquerade (1932) - Dinner Guest (uncredited)
- The Night of June 13 (1932) - Otto
- Hat Check Girl (1932) - Professor (uncredited)
- Rockabye (1932) - Doc (uncredited)
- Smoke Lightning (1933) - Parson
- Private Jones (1933) - Lecturer (uncredited)
- Diplomaniacs (1933) - Ship's Captain
- Man Hunt (1933) - Sheriff Bascom
- No Marriage Ties (1933) - Peggy's Song Publisher Escort (uncredited)
- Morning Glory (1933) - Henry Lawrence
- Golden Harvest (1933) - Doctor Hoyt
- Ladies Must Love (1933) - Wilbur Muller
- Moulin Rouge (1934) - Sugar Daddy (uncredited)
- Beloved (1934) - Judge B. T. Belden
- Caravan (1934) - Majordomo
- George White's Scandals (1934) - Minister
- Harold Teen (1934) - Parmalee - School Official
- Bottoms Up (1934) - Party Guest (uncredited)
- Sing and Like It (1934) - Mr. Abercrombie Hancock - Critic
- The Witching Hour (1934) - Lew Ellinger
- The Last Round-Up (1934) - Judge Savin
- Affairs of a Gentleman (1934) - Paul Q. Bindar
- Hollywood Party (1934) - Knapp
- Such Women Are Dangerous (1934) - Thomas H. Delahanty
- The Old Fashioned Way (1934) - Sheriff of Barnesville
- Wake Up and Dream (1934) - Roger Babcock
- The Merry Widow (1934) - Defense Attorney (uncredited)
- The Ghost Walks (1934) - Herman Wood
- Life Returns (1935) - A.K. Arnold
- Home on the Range (1935) - Butts
- Night Life of the Gods (1935) - Grandpa Lambert
- Baby Face Harrington (1935) - Judge Forbes
- Love in Bloom (1935) - Sheriff
- Together We Live (1935) - Charlie
- Here Comes Cookie (1935) - Sam (uncredited)
- The Gay Deception (1935) - Mr. Spitzer
- Moonlight on the Prairie (1935) - Colonel Gowdy
- I Dream Too Much (1935) - Snobbish Critic (uncredited)
- Nevada (1935) - Judge Franklidge
- The Bride Comes Home (1935) - Frank - Butler
- Dangerous (1935) - Pitt Hanley
- Anything Goes (1936) - Bishop Dobson
- Drift Fence (1936) - Sheriff Bingham
- The Trail of the Lonesome Pine (1936) - Ezra Tolliver
- The Little Red Schoolhouse (1936) - The Professor, a Hobo
- Love Before Breakfast (1936) - Brinkerhoff
- Small Town Girl (1936) - Jeffers Cass, J.P. (uncredited)
- Let's Sing Again (1936) - Carter
- The Case Against Mrs. Ames (1936) - Uncle Gordon
- One Rainy Afternoon (1936) - Minister of Justice
- Three of a Kind (1936) - F. Thorndyke Penfield
- San Francisco (1936) - Founders' Club Member (uncredited)
- The Arizona Raiders (1936) - Boswell Albernathy, Justice of the Peace
- Spendthrift (1936) - Popsy
- The Texas Rangers (1936) - Casper Johnson
- The Man I Marry (1936) - Storekeeper
- Easy to Take (1936) - Attorney Olney
- Arizona Mahoney (1936) - Sheriff
- College Holiday (1936) - Judge Bent
- Champagne Waltz (1937) - Messenger (uncredited)
- She's Dangerous (1937) - Kegley
- Outcast (1937) - Mooney
- Top of the Town (1937) - Edwin Borden
- Racketeers in Exile (1937) - Regan Langdon aka 'Porky'
- The Man in Blue (1937) - Willie Loomis
- Married Before Breakfast (1937) - Colonel Eustace Randolph (uncredited)
- Rhythm in the Clouds (1937) - J.C. Boswell
- Love in a Bungalow (1937) - Mr. Bisbee
- It's All Yours (1937) - Judge Reynolds
- She Asked for It (1937) - Ted Hoyt
- Merry-Go-Round of 1938 (1937) - Col. J. Addison Frooks
- I'll Take Romance (1937) - Rudi
- 45 Fathers (1937) - Bunny Carothers
- True Confession (1937) - Judge
- Persons in Hiding (1939) - Zeke (Pa) Bronson
- It's a Wonderful World (1939) - Major I.E. Willoughby
- Undercover Doctor (1939) - Elmer Porter
- Maisie (1939) - Roger Bannerman
- Ninotchka (1939) - Gaston
- Remember? (1939) - Mr. Piper
- Parole Fixer (1940) - Gustav Kalkus
- The Ghost Comes Home (1940) - John Reed Thomas
- Ma! He's Making Eyes at Me (1940) - C. J. Woodbury
- Lillian Russell (1940) - Bradley (uncredited)
- Those Were the Days! (1940) - Old Man (uncredited)
- The Great McGinty (1940) - Dr. Jonas J. Jarvis - Card Player in Cantina (uncredited)
- Comin' Round the Mountain (1940) - Lester Smoot
- The Golden Fleecing (1940) - Pattington
- Seven Sinners (1940) - District Officer
- One Night in the Tropics (1940) - James G. Moore
- Las Vegas Nights (1941) - Judge Elkins (uncredited)
- The Devil and Miss Jones (1941) - Oliver
- That Uncertain Feeling (1941) - The Butler
- Million Dollar Baby (1941) - George
- My Life with Caroline (1941) - Reverend Dr. Curtis (uncredited)
- A Dangerous Game (1941) - Agatha - alias Mooseface Hogarty
- New Wine (1941) - Karl Hasslinger
- Buy Me That Town (1941) - Judge Paradise
- Moonlight in Hawaii (1941) - J. B. Lawton
