= Sally Starr (actress) =

American actress (1909–1996)

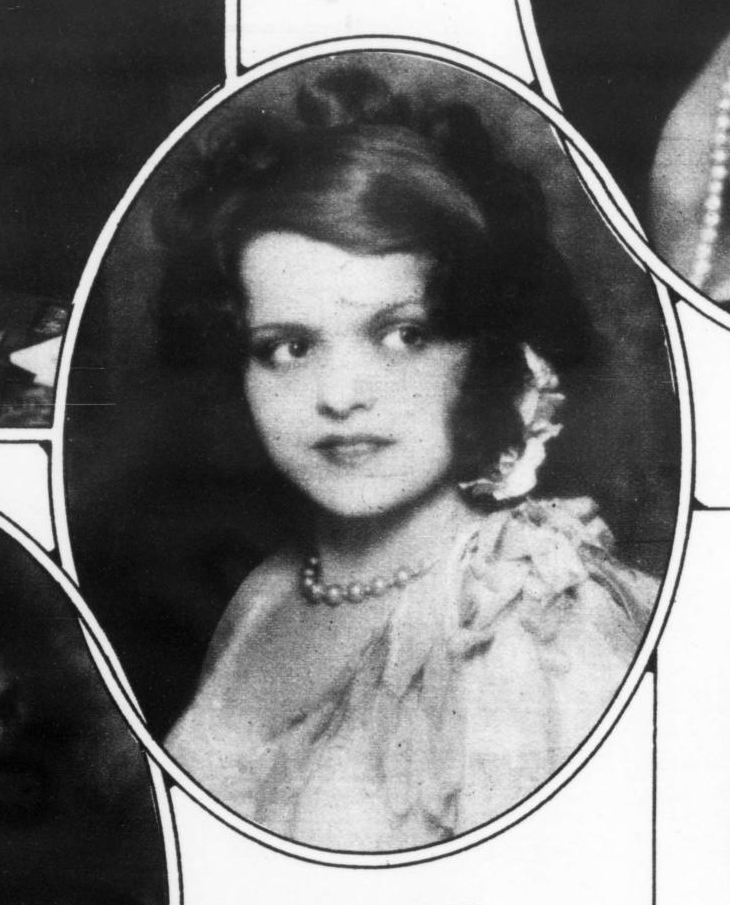
- Starr in early 1928 during The Optimists
- Born: January 23, 1909; Pittsburgh, Pennsylvania
- Died: May 5, 1996 (aged 87); Pittsburgh, Pennsylvania
- Occupations: Actress (film and theatre)
- Spouse(s): W. Miles Cary, Jr. (1936-1952); John F. Kovacevich (1959-1996) (her death)

Sally Starr (born Sarah Kathryn Sturm; January 23, 1909 – May 5, 1996) was an American theatrical and film actress known for her work during the 1920s and 1930s. A native of Pittsburgh, Pennsylvania, she was discovered while visiting the set of Ted Lewis's show as a teenager.

== History ==
Born in Pittsburgh, Pennsylvania as Sarah Kathryn Sturm on January 23, 1909, she was a daughter of Harry and Sarah E. Sturm. As a toddler, she resided with her parents at the home of her paternal grandparents, Henry and Lotta Sturm, in Pittsburgh's 11th ward, where her father and grandfather were both hardware merchants and her paternal aunt was a school teacher. A decade later, she and her five-year-old brother, Raymond, were living with their parents at their own home in Pittsburgh's 10th ward. Her father was employed that year as a laundry superintendent.

While on a summer break from her studies at Pittsburgh's Peabody High School, she was sent to New York by her parents to visit her maternal grandmother, Mrs. Emma Imhoff, and was noticed as she spontaneously danced in the wings to the music of a Ted Lewis show rehearsal, having been invited to that rehearsal by a friend. Recruited by the show's director, she was subsequently chaperoned by her grandmother, who accompanied her as she toured with the Lewis show chorus. Frequently compared to Clara Bow, Sturm made her debut in Lewis' Frolics, and then also appeared in George White's Scandals of 1924. White changed the showgirl's name to "Sally Starr".

Starr performed with Eleanor Powell and George Hassell in The Optimists, staged at the Century Roof Theater in January 1928. The same year she was cast with Elliott Nugent, Robert Montgomery, and Phyllis Crane in So This Is College. She signed a contract with MGM and moved to Hollywood.

While in Hollywood, she had leading roles in So This Is College (1929), The Woman Racket (1930), Not So Dumb (1930), Personality (1930), Pardon My Gun (1930) and For The Love o' Lil (1930). She was signed for Swing High (1930), a Pathé production released by RKO.

The actress continued to spend summers with her family in Pittsburgh. In 1936 she married W. Miles Cary, Jr., who held executive positions with Pepsi-Cola and later the Guinness brewing company.

That same year she was hired by Paramount Pictures for short subjects filmed in New York. Later in 1936 she was signed by New York-based comedy-shorts studio Educational Pictures. Although she was in her late twenties at the time, she still projected a fresh-faced youth and became Educational's all-purpose ingenue, appearing opposite several of the studio's resident comedians including Bert Lahr, Charles Kemper, Danny Kaye, and the team of Herman Timberg, Jr. and Pat Rooney, Jr. She almost certainly would have continued at Educational if the company hadn't discontinued production at the end of 1937. When the studio closed, Starr retired from the screen. She and her husband Miles Cary divorced in 1952 after 16 years of marriage, soon after Cary took on additional responsibilities with Guinness's three affiliated companies.

Starr's mother, together with Sally and her siblings, relocated to Miami, Florida. In 1958 Sally Starr returned to Pennsylvania, assisting producer Frederick Burleigh in the stage presentation of The Boy Friend, which led to her being cast in the Mary Chase's play Bernardine at the Pittsburgh Playhouse. Bernardine opened on May 31 and ran for four weeks.

At 50, under the name Sally Starr Cary, she married Pennsylvania native John F. Kovacevich (1912-2001) on May 1, 1959, in Miami Beach, Florida, where they spent their honeymoon. The couple returned to Pennsylvania. The Pennsylvania-born Sally Starr is not to be confused with the Philadelphia TV personality Sally Starr.

== Death and interment ==
Sally Starr succumbed to heart disease at her home in South Park Township, Allegheny County, Pennsylvania on May 5, 1996. She was buried as "Sally (Mrs. John F.) Kovacevich" in the Garden of Devotion (lot 111-D, space 4) at Jefferson Memorial Park, which is located south of Pittsburgh in the community of Pleasant Hills, Pennsylvania. She was survived by her second husband, who died on September 15, 2001.

== Selected filmography ==
- The Man Trap (1917)
- The Flash of Fate (1918)
- Smashing Through (1918)
- So This Is College (1929)
- Personality (1930)
- The Woman Racket (1930)
- For the Love o' Lil (1930)
- Swing High (1930)
- Montague the Magnificent (with Bert Lahr, 1937)
- Meet the Bride (with Timberg & Rooney, 1938)
- Money on Your Life (with Charles Kemper and Danny Kaye, 1938)
