= Navy Blues (1929 film) =

1929 film

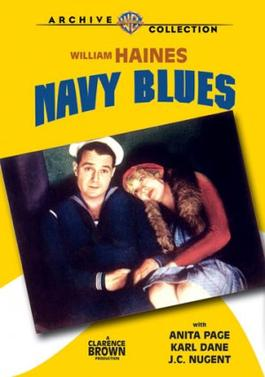
- Directed by: Clarence Brown
- Written by: Raymond L. Schrock (story); Dale Van Every (adaptation); J.C. Nugent (dialogue); Elliott Nugent (dialogue); W. L. River (dialogue)
- Produced by: Clarence Brown
- Starring: William Haines; Anita Page
- Cinematography: Merritt B. Gerstad
- Edited by: Hugh Wynn
- Music by: William Axt
- Production company: Metro-Goldwyn-Mayer
- Distributed by: Metro-Goldwyn-Mayer
- Release date: December 20, 1929
- Running time: 75-77 minutes
- Country: United States
- Language: English

Navy Blues is a 1929 American Pre-Code romance film starring William Haines as a sailor and Anita Page as the girl he romances and leaves. This was Haines' first talking picture.

== Plot summary ==
Navy Blues (1929)

== Cast ==
- William Haines as Jack Kelly
- Anita Page as Alice Brown
- Karl Dane as Sven Swanson
- J.C. Nugent as Mr. Reginald Brown
- Edythe Chapman as Mrs. Brown
- Wade Boteler as Chief Petty Officer Higgins

== See also ==
- List of early sound feature films (1926–1929)
