= Love in Bloom (film) =

1935 film by Elliott Nugent

- Directed by: Elliott Nugent
- Screenplay by: Frank R. Adams; J.P. McEvoy; John P. Medbury; Keene Thompson
- Produced by: Benjamin Glazer
- Starring: George Burns; Gracie Allen; Joe Morrison; Dixie Lee; J. C. Nugent; Lee Kohlmar; Richard Carle
- Cinematography: Leo Tover
- Edited by: William Shea
- Music by: Harry Revel; Heinz Roemheld
- Production company: Paramount Pictures
- Distributed by: Paramount Pictures
- Release date: March 15, 1935
- Running time: 75 minutes
- Country: United States
- Language: English

Love in Bloom is a 1935 American comedy film directed by Elliott Nugent and written by Frank R. Adams, J.P. McEvoy, John P. Medbury and Keene Thompson. The film stars George Burns, Gracie Allen, Joe Morrison, Dixie Lee, J. C. Nugent, Lee Kohlmar and Richard Carle. The film was released on March 15, 1935, by Paramount Pictures.

== Plot ==
Colonel Downey, a carnival owner, goes bankrupt and lands in jail. His daughter-in-law Gracie Downey decides to travel to New York City to find George's sister Violet and ask for financial aid. George goes along with Gracie, and together they find Vi dining with songwriter Larry Deane, unaware that both Vi and Larry don't have a dollar left between them. They drive cross country in a musical calliope truck, making quite the attraction on the main highways.

Vi and Larry each get a job in Pop Heinrich's music store, where she turns out to be good at sales by singing songs to customers with Larry's accompaniment. Vi is able to get her belongings back from the apartment where she was locked out, but gives what's left of her money to George to bail her father out of jail. Larry and Violet are going to be married, but her drunken father barges into the church and attempts to stop the wrong wedding. Violet flees the church in shame, and goes back to work at her Father's carnival out of defeat. One of Larry's songs,"My Heart is An Open Book", becomes a global hit. Larry then uses his earnings to become one of the carnival's new owners, and he and Violet are reconciled.

== Cast ==
- George Burns as George
- Gracie Allen as Gracie Downey
- Joe Morrison as Larry Deane
- Dixie Lee as Violet Downey
- J. C. Nugent as Col. 'Dad' Downey
- Lee Kohlmar as Pop Heinrich
- Richard Carle as Sheriff
