= The Virtuous Husband =

1931 film

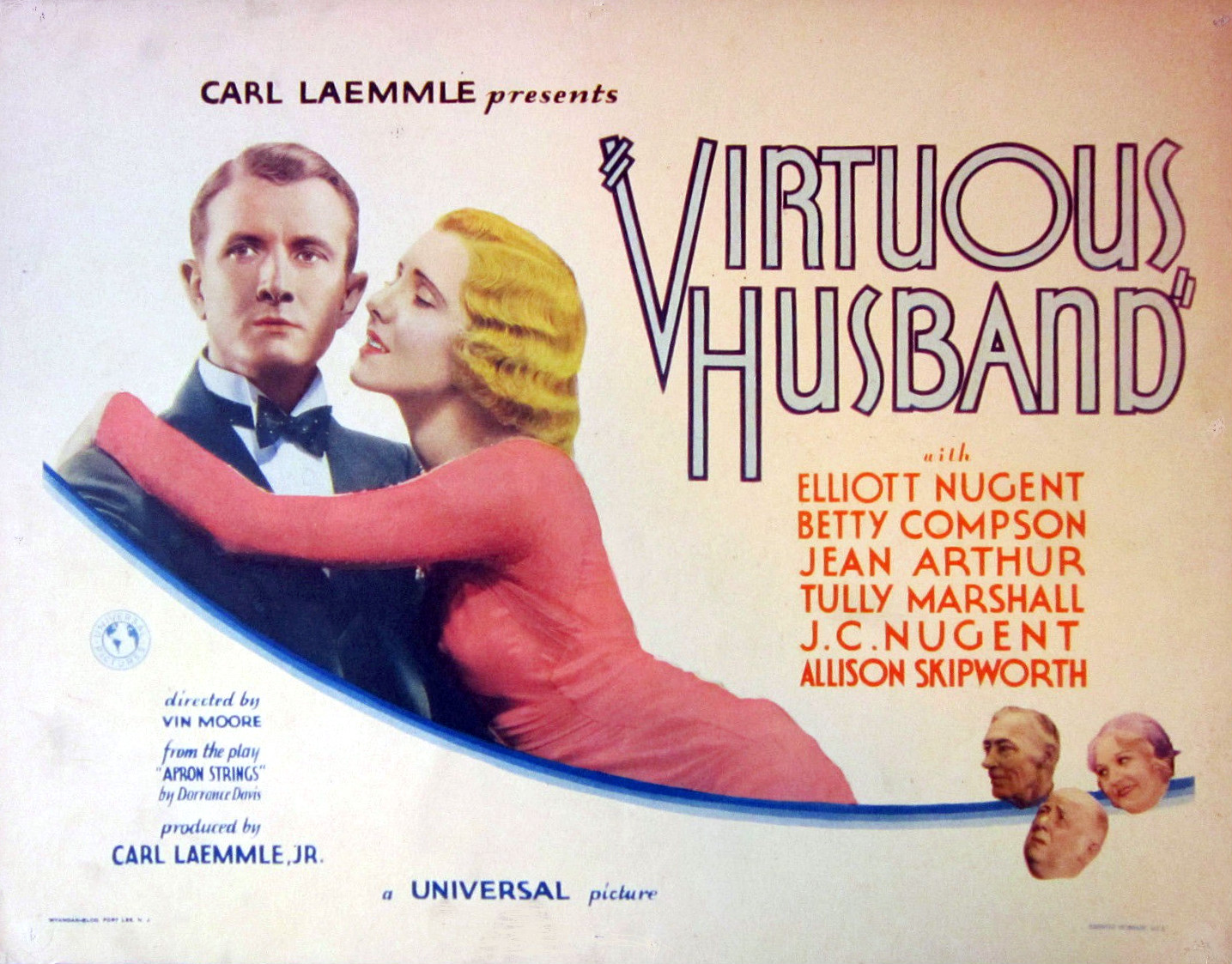
- Theatrical release poster
- Directed by: Vin Moore
- Screenplay by: Jerry Horwin; Edward Ludwig; Fred Niblo, Jr. Dale Van Every
- Produced by: Carl Laemmle, Jr.
- Starring: Betty Compson; Elliott Nugent; Jean Arthur; J. C. Nugent; Alison Skipworth; Tully Marshall
- Cinematography: Jerome Ash
- Edited by: Arthur Hilton; Harry W. Lieb
- Production company: Universal Pictures
- Distributed by: Universal Pictures
- Release date: April 12, 1931
- Running time: 75 minutes
- Country: United States
- Language: English

The Virtuous Husband is a 1931 American pre-Code comedy film directed by Vin Moore and written by Jerry Horwin, Edward Ludwig, Fred Niblo, Jr. and Dale Van Every. The film stars Betty Compson, Elliott Nugent, Jean Arthur, J. C. Nugent, Alison Skipworth and Tully Marshall. The film was released on April 12, 1931, by Universal Pictures.

== Plot ==
A man marries at a young age and bases all of his marriage decisions on advice written in letters from his dead mother. The wife can't stand it and eventually burns them, and the man grows more tolerable.

== Cast ==
- Elliott Nugent as Daniel Curtis
- Betty Compson as Inez Wakefield
- Jean Arthur as Barbara Olwell
- Tully Marshall as Ezra Hunniwell
- J. C. Nugent as Mr. Olwell
- Alison Skipworth as Mrs. Olwell
- Eva McKenzie as Hester
- Willie Best as Luftus
