= The Sins of the Children =

1930 film directed by Sam Wood

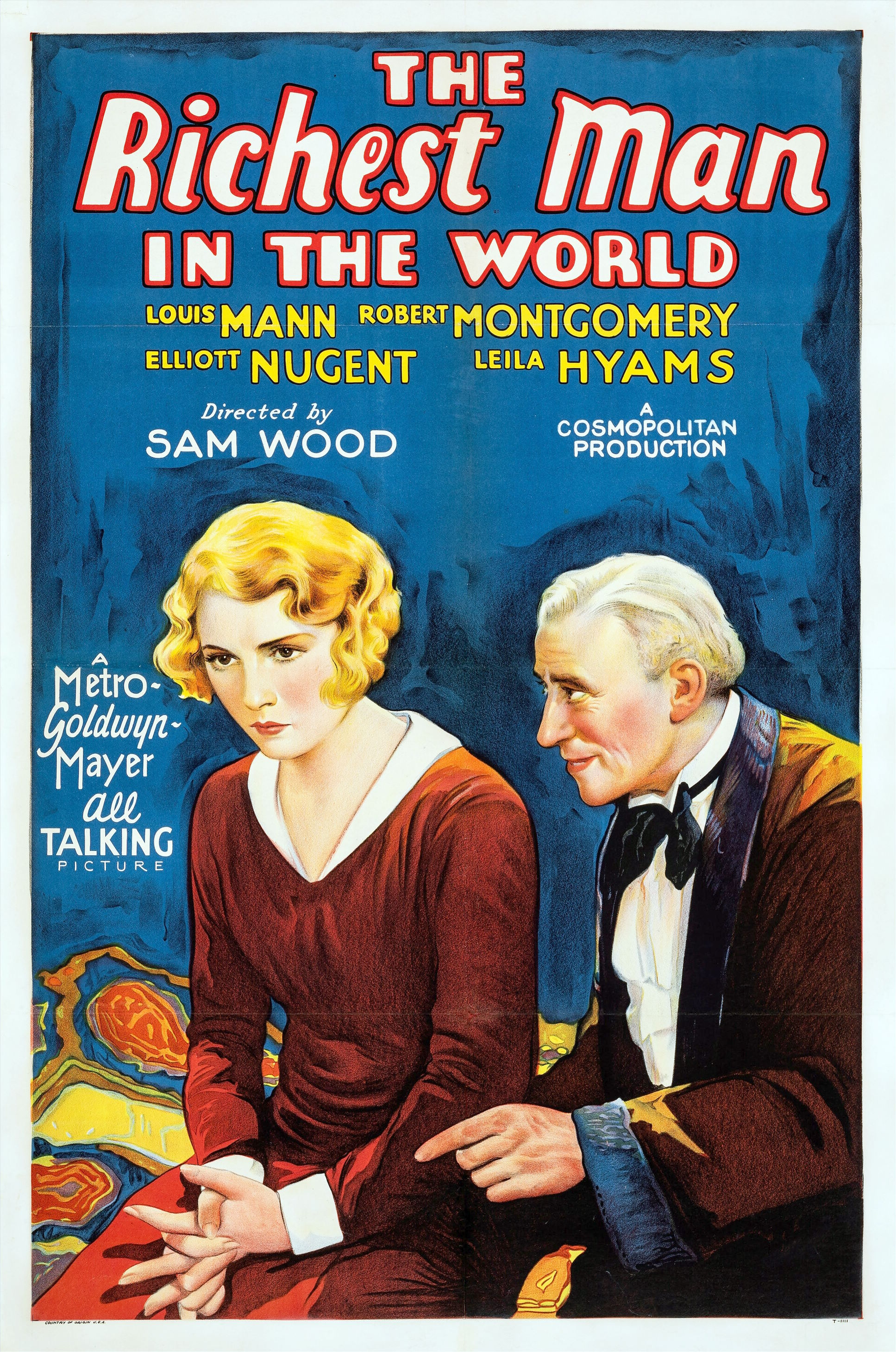
- Theatrical release poster (under by its alternative title)
- Directed by: Sam Wood
- Produced by: Sam Wood
- Starring: Louis Mann; Robert Montgomery; Elliott Nugent; Ralph Bushman
- Cinematography: Henry Sharp
- Edited by: Frank Sullivan
- Production companies: Metro-Goldwyn-Mayer; Cosmopolitan Productions
- Distributed by: Metro-Goldwyn-Mayer
- Release date: June 28, 1930 (U.S.)
- Running time: 87 minutes
- Country: United States
- Language: English

The Sins of the Children, also known as Father's Day and The Richest Man in the World, is a 1930 American pre-Code drama film, which was produced and directed by Sam Wood and distributed by Metro-Goldwyn-Mayer.

== Plot ==
Adolf Wagenkampf, a German immigrant barber on the verge of becoming rich, takes his sickly son away on a two-year stay in a drier climate. The man's partner deems him a failure, but he learns that his family is more important than finance.

== Cast ==
- Louis Mann as Adolf Wagenkampf
- Robert Montgomery as Nick Higginson
- Elliott Nugent as Johann Wagenkampf
- Leila Hyams as Alma Wagenkampf
- Clara Blandick as Martha Wagenkampf
- Mary Doran as Laura
- Ralph Bushman as Ludwig Wagenkampf
- Robert McWade as Joe Higginson
- Dell Henderson as Ted Baldwin
- Henry Armetta as Tony
- Jane Reid as Katherine Wagenkampf Taylor
- James Donlan as Bide Taylor
- Jeane Wood as Muriel Stokes
- Lee Kohlmar as Dr Heinrich Schmidt

== Production ==
Elliott Nugent and his father were commissioned to write the script after the success of Wise Girls.
