= The Flash of Fate =

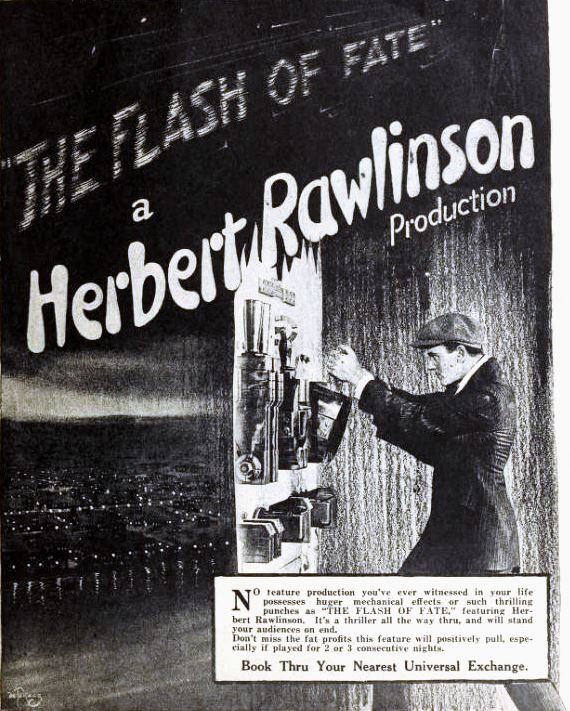
- Directed by: Elmer Clifton
- Written by: Waldemar Young; W.B. Pearson; James W. Atchison
- Produced by: Herbert Rawlinson
- Starring: Herbert Rawlinson; Sally Starr; Jack Nelson
- Cinematography: Virgil Miller
- Production company: Universal Pictures
- Distributed by: Universal Pictures
- Release date: February 18, 1918
- Running time: 50 minutes
- Country: United States
- Languages: Silent; English intertitles

The Flash of Fate is a 1918 American silent thriller film directed by Elmer Clifton and starring Herbert Rawlinson, Sally Starr and Jack Nelson.

== Cast ==
- Herbert Rawlinson as Randolph Shorb
- Sally Starr as Mary Freeman
- Jack Nelson as Joe Freeman
- Dana Ong as Henry Shorb
- Madge Kirby as Gertrude Shorb
- Willis Marks as Abner Hinman
- Charles West as Philadelphia Johnson
- L. Frank Baum as Dave Hinman

== Bibliography ==
- James Robert Parish & Michael R. Pitts. Film directors: a guide to their American films. Scarecrow Press, 1974.
