= For the Love o' Lil =

1930 film

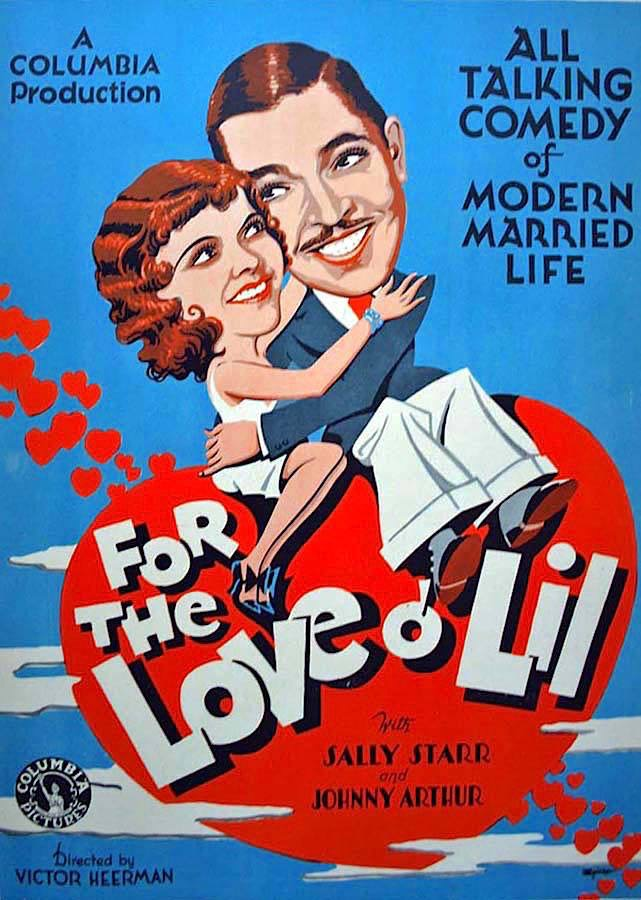
- Theatrical release poster
- Directed by: James Tinling
- Written by: Bella Cohen (adaptation and dialogue); Robert Bruckner (adaptation and dialogue); Leslie Thrasher (original drawings)
- Screenplay by: Dorothy Howell
- Story by: Lewis Seiler
- Starring: Jack Mulhall; Sally Starr; Elliott Nugent; Margaret Livingston; Charles Sellon
- Cinematography: Ted Tetzlaff
- Edited by: Edward Curtiss
- Production company: Columbia Pictures
- Distributed by: Columbia Pictures
- Release date: August 29, 1930
- Running time: 67 minutes
- Country: United States
- Language: English

For the Love o' Lil is a 1930 American drama film directed by James Tinling and starring Jack Mulhall, Sally Starr, Elliott Nugent, Margaret Livingston, and Charles Sellon. The film was released by Columbia Pictures on August 29, 1930.

== Cast ==
- Jack Mulhall as Wyn Huntley
- Sally Starr as Lil Huntley
- Elliott Nugent as Sandy Jenkins
- Margaret Livingston as Eleanor Cartwright
- Charles Sellon as Mr. Walker
- Julia Swayne Gordon as Mrs. Walker
- Billy Bevan as Edward O. Walker
- Claire Du Brey as Mrs. Gardner
- Joan Standing as Chambermaid
