= Personality (film) =

1930 film

- Directed by: Victor Heerman
- Written by: Gladys Lehman; Victor Heerman
- Produced by: Harry Cohn
- Starring: Sally Starr; Johnny Arthur; Blanche Friderici
- Cinematography: Ted Tetzlaff
- Edited by: David Berg
- Production company: Columbia Pictures
- Distributed by: Columbia Pictures
- Release date: February 14, 1930
- Running time: 67 minutes
- Country: United States
- Language: English

Personality is a 1930 American comedy film directed by Victor Heerman and starring Sally Starr, Johnny Arthur and Blanche Friderici.

== Cast ==
- Sally Starr as Lil Morse
- Johnny Arthur as Sandy Jenkins
- Blanche Friderici as Ma
- Frank Hammond as Pa
- Buck Black as Junior
- Lee Kohlmar as Mr. Himmelschlosser
- John T. Murray as Mr. Keller
- Vivien Oakland as Mrs. Keller
- George C. Pearce as Mr. Abbott

== Bibliography ==
- Larry Langman & Ronald H. Miller. A guide to American film directors: the sound era, 1929-1979. Scarecrow Press, 1981.
