= Mary Doran =

American actress (1910–1995)

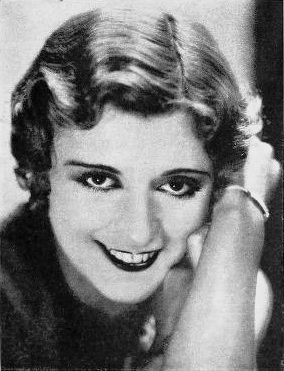
- Doran in 1932
- Born: September 8, 1910; New York City, U.S.
- Died: September 6, 1995 (aged 84); New York City, U.S.
- Occupation: Actress
- Years active: 1927–1944
- Spouse: Joseph Sherman (1931–1937) (divorced)

Mary Doran (September 8, 1910 – September 6, 1995) was an American actress. She appeared in more than 80 films from 1927 to 1944.

== Biography ==
Doran was born in New York and attended public schools there before graduating and going to Columbia University. She left Columbia after three years to pursue a career on stage. She sang and danced in Belle Baker's Betsy when it was in New York. Later, she performed in Flo Ziegfeld's Rio Rita.

Doran's films included Broadway Melody, Half a Bride, and The Trial of Mary Dugan. In 1929, Doran was under contract to Metro-Goldwyn-Mayer.

== Personal life ==
On August 15, 1931, Doran married Joseph Sherman in San Diego, California. Sherman was Metro-Goldwyn-Mayer's chief publicity director.

== Partial filmography ==
- Half a Bride (1928)
- The River Woman (1928)
- The Broadway Melody (1929)
- Lucky Boy (1929)
- The Trial of Mary Dugan (1929)
- The Girl in the Show (1929)
- Tonight at Twelve (1929)
- Their Own Desire (1929)
- Our Blushing Brides (1930)
- They Learned About Women (1930)
- The Divorcee (1930)
- The Sins of the Children (1930)
- Remote Control (1930)
- The Third Alarm (1930)
- The Criminal Code (1931)
- Party Husband (1931)
- Their Mad Moment (1931)
- Ex-Bad Boy (1931)
- Fifty Fathoms Deep (1931)
- Ridin' for Justice (1932)
- The Final Edition (1932)
- Beauty and the Boss (1932)
- The Silver Lining (1932)
- Miss Pinkerton (1932)
- The Strange Love of Molly Louvain (1932)
- Movie Crazy (1932)
- Exposure (1932)
- Breach of Promise (1932)
- Sing Sing Nights (1934)
- Sunset Range (1935)
- Murder in the Fleet (1935) (uncredited)
- Naughty Marietta (1935) (uncredited)
- The Border Patrolman (1936)
- The Bridge of Sighs (1936)
