= The Woman Racket =

1930 film

- Directed by: Robert Ober; Albert H. Kelley; Paul Bern (uncredited)
- Written by: Albert Shelby Le Vino
- Based on: Night Hostess; 1928 novel by Philip Dunning; Frances Dunning
- Produced by: Metro Goldwyn Mayer
- Starring: Blanche Sweet
- Cinematography: J. Peverell Marley
- Edited by: Anton Stevenson; Basil Wrangell
- Music by: William Axt
- Distributed by: Metro-Goldwyn-Mayer
- Release date: January 24, 1930
- Running time: 70 minutes
- Country: United States
- Language: English

The Woman Racket is an extant 1930 American Pre-Code talking film directed by Robert Ober and Albert H. Kelley and starring Tom Moore and Blanche Sweet. It was produced and distributed by Metro-Goldwyn-Mayer. It was written by Albert Shelby Le Vino, based on the 1928 Broadway play Night Hostess by Philip Dunning. In January 2012 the film became available on DVD from the Warner Archive Collection home library. It was one of Blanche Sweet's three talking films.

== Cast ==
- Tom Moore as Tom Hayes
- Blanche Sweet as Julia Barnes Hayes
- Sally Starr as Buddy
- Robert Agnew as Rags Conway
- John Miljan as Chris Miller
- Tenen Holtz as Ben
- Lew Kelly as Tish
- Tom London as Hennessy
- Eugene Borden as Lefty
- Richard Travers as Frank Wardell

== See also ==
- Blanche Sweet filmography
