= Remote Control (1930 film) =

1930 film by Nick Grinde, Edward Sedgwick and Malcolm St. Clair

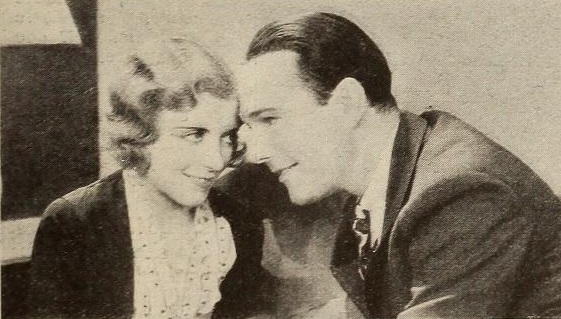
- Still photo from a magazine
- Directed by: Nick Grinde; Edward Sedgwick; Malcolm St. Clair
- Screenplay by: Frank Butler; F. Hugh Herbert; Jack Nelson
- Based on: Remote Control; 1929 play by: Clyde North; Albert C. Fuller; Jack Nelson
- Produced by: Edward Sedgwick
- Starring: William Haines; Charles King; John Miljan; Polly Moran; J. C. Nugent
- Cinematography: Merritt B. Gerstad
- Edited by: Harry Reynolds
- Production company: Metro-Goldwyn-Mayer
- Distributed by: Metro-Goldwyn-Mayer
- Release date: November 15, 1930
- Running time: 65 minutes
- Country: United States
- Language: English

Remote Control is a 1930 American pre-Code comedy film directed by Nick Grinde, Edward Sedgwick and Malcolm St. Clair and written by Frank Butler, F. Hugh Herbert and Jack Nelson. The film stars William Haines, Charles King, John Miljan, Polly Moran and J. C. Nugent.

It was released on November 15, 1930 by Metro-Goldwyn-Mayer.

== Plot ==
Remote Control (1930)

A nefarious criminal genius, Doctor Kruger directs bank robberies from his radio studio, where he poses as a clairvoyant host offering platitudinous advice to listeners. His gang de-codes these broadcast messages and successfully rob designated banks. William Haines discovers the ruse and in turn is kidnapped by the crooks, who are determined to silence him. After a climatic chase, William escapes and Kruger and his gang are exposed and arrested.

== Cast ==
- William Haines as William J. Brennan
- Charles King as Sam Ferguson
- Mary Doran as Marion Ferguson
- John Miljan as Doctor Kruger
- Polly Moran as Polly
- J. C. Nugent as Smedley
- Edward Nugent as radio engineer
- Wilbur Mack as chief of police
- James Donlan as Blodgett
- Edward Brophy as Al
- Warner Richmond as Max
- Russell Hopton as Frank
