= The Man Trap (film) =

- Directed by: Elmer Clifton
- Written by: Waldemar Young
- Starring: Herbert Rawlinson; Ruby Lafayette; Sally Starr
- Cinematography: Virgil Miller
- Production company: Universal Pictures
- Distributed by: Universal Pictures
- Release date: October 29, 1917
- Running time: 50 minutes
- Country: United States
- Languages: Silent; English intertitles

The Man Trap is a 1917 American silent crime drama film directed by Elmer Clifton and starring Herbert Rawlinson, Ruby Lafayette and Sally Starr.

== Cast ==
- Herbert Rawlinson as John Mull
- Ruby Lafayette as Mrs. Mull
- Sally Starr as Bess Miller
- Jack Nelson as Burton Grange
- Mark Fenton as R.H. Steadman
- Frank MacQuarrie as Finch
- Hal Wilson as Trusty

== Bibliography ==
- James Robert Parish & Michael R. Pitts. Film directors: a guide to their American films. Scarecrow Press, 1974.
