= Breach of Promise (1932 film) =

1932 film

- Directed by: Paul L. Stein
- Screenplay by: John F. Goodrich
- Based on: "Obscurity"; Cosmopolitan story by Rupert Hughes
- Produced by: Ben Verschleiser
- Starring: Chester Morris; Mae Clarke; Mary Doran
- Cinematography: Jacob A. Badaracco
- Edited by: Doane Harrison
- Production company: Ben Verschleiser Productions
- Distributed by: Sono Art-World Wide Pictures
- Release date: October 23, 1932
- Running time: 64 minutes
- Country: United States
- Language: English

Breach of Promise is a 1932 American pre-Code drama film directed by Paul L. Stein and starring Chester Morris, Mae Clarke and Mary Doran.

== Cast ==
- Chester Morris as James Pomeroy
- Mae Clarke as Hattie Pugmire
- Mary Doran as Mille Applegate
- Theodore von Eltz as District Attorney
- Elizabeth Patterson as Cora Pugmire
- Charles Middleton as Joe Pugmire
- Lucille La Verne as Mrs. Flynn
- Eddie Borden as Hotel Clerk
- Edward LeSaint as Judge
- Alan Roscoe as Committeeman
- Harriet Lorraine as Committeewoman
- Philo McCullough as Committeeman
- Tom Mcguire as Committeeman

== Plot ==
Farm girl Hattie dreams of a day when she will be delivered from the drudgery of the farm work foisted on her by her foster parents. Her friend Millie, who has experienced city life, returns to town and teaches Hattie the ways of the city.
