= J. C. Nugent =

American actor (1868–1947)

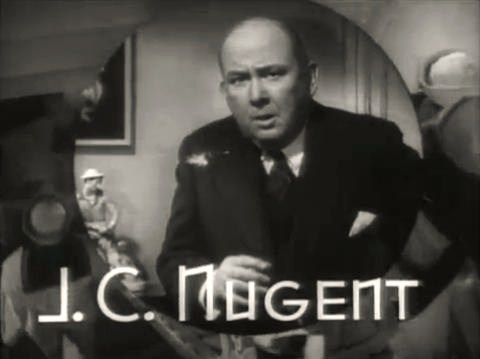
- Trailer for Give Me a Sailor (1938)
- Born: John Charles Nugent; April 6, 1868; Niles, Ohio, U.S.
- Died: April 21, 1947 (aged 79); New York City, U.S.
- Education: Reeves University
- Occupations: Actor; director; screenwriter
- Years active: 1929–1943
- Spouse: Grace Mary Fertig (m. 1883; died 1930)
- Children: 2; including Elliott Nugent

John Charles Nugent (April 6, 1868 – April 21, 1947), was an American playwright, actor, director, and screenwriter. A veteran stage performer, he appeared in 20 films between 1929 and 1943.

== Early life ==
Nugent was born in Niles, Ohio, and attended Reeves University.

== Career ==
By 1900, Nugent was active in vaudeville.

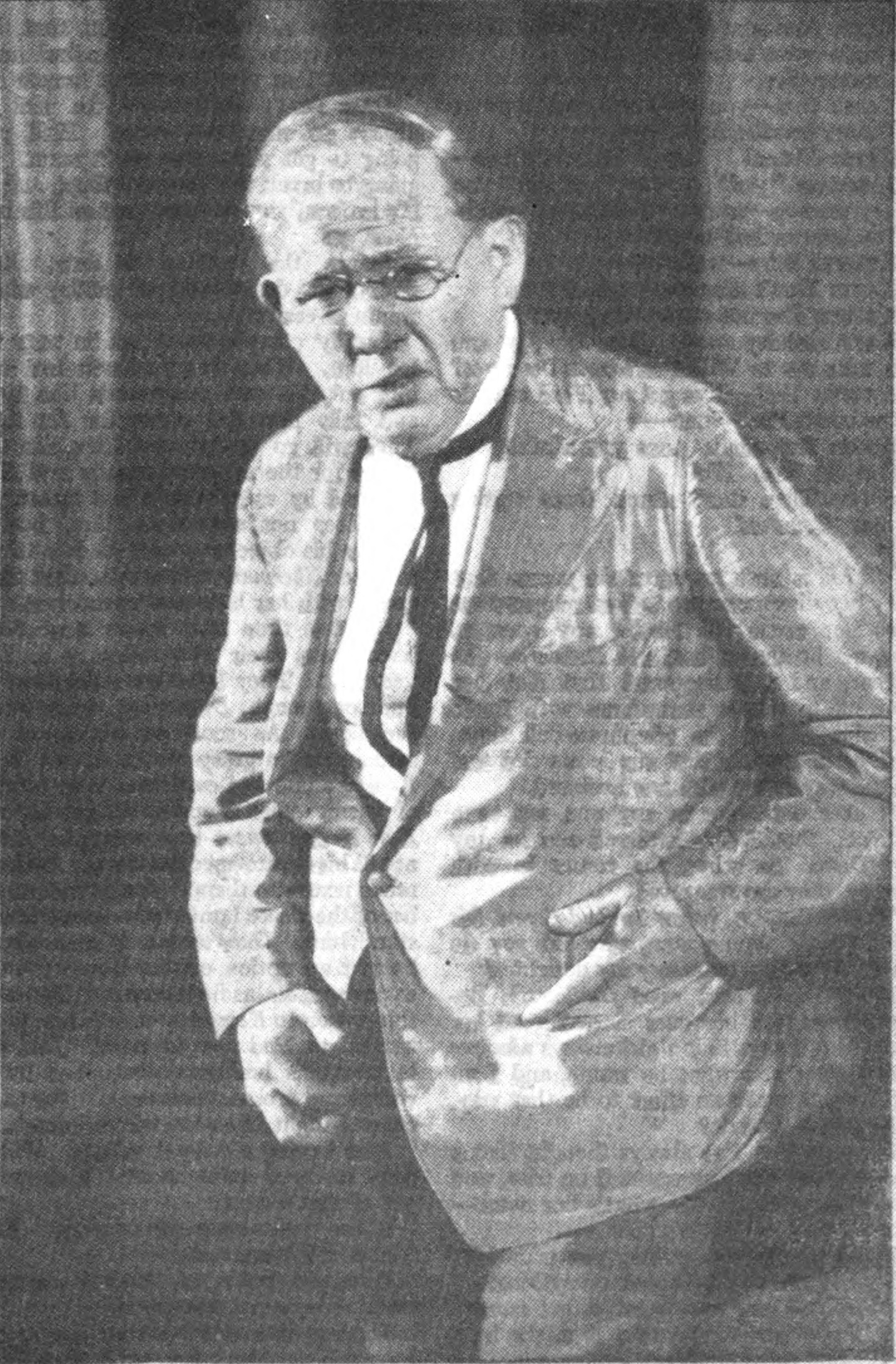
J. C. Nugent in 1922

Nugent's Broadway debut came in the comedy Kempy (1922), which he wrote. Kempy was considered a success. Dorothy Parker enthusiastically reviewed Kempy in her theater column in Ainslee's Magazine, saying, "People strayed into the Belmont Theatre on the opening night with an air of, 'I may stick it out for an act or so, but I'm glad of the chance to get to bed early.' And then Kempy turned out to be one of the nicest little comedies they ever saw in their lives."

From 1922 until 1947, Nugent directed and wrote plays, occasionally acting in some of them.

== Personal life ==
He was the father of actor, writer and producer Elliott Nugent, with whom he sometimes wrote or acted, and actress Ruth Elizabeth Nugent. Nugent was also the father-in-law of actor Alan Bunce of Ethel and Albert fame.

Nugent died in New York City.

== Theater ==
- Kempy (1922)
- Take My Advice (1927)

== Filmography ==
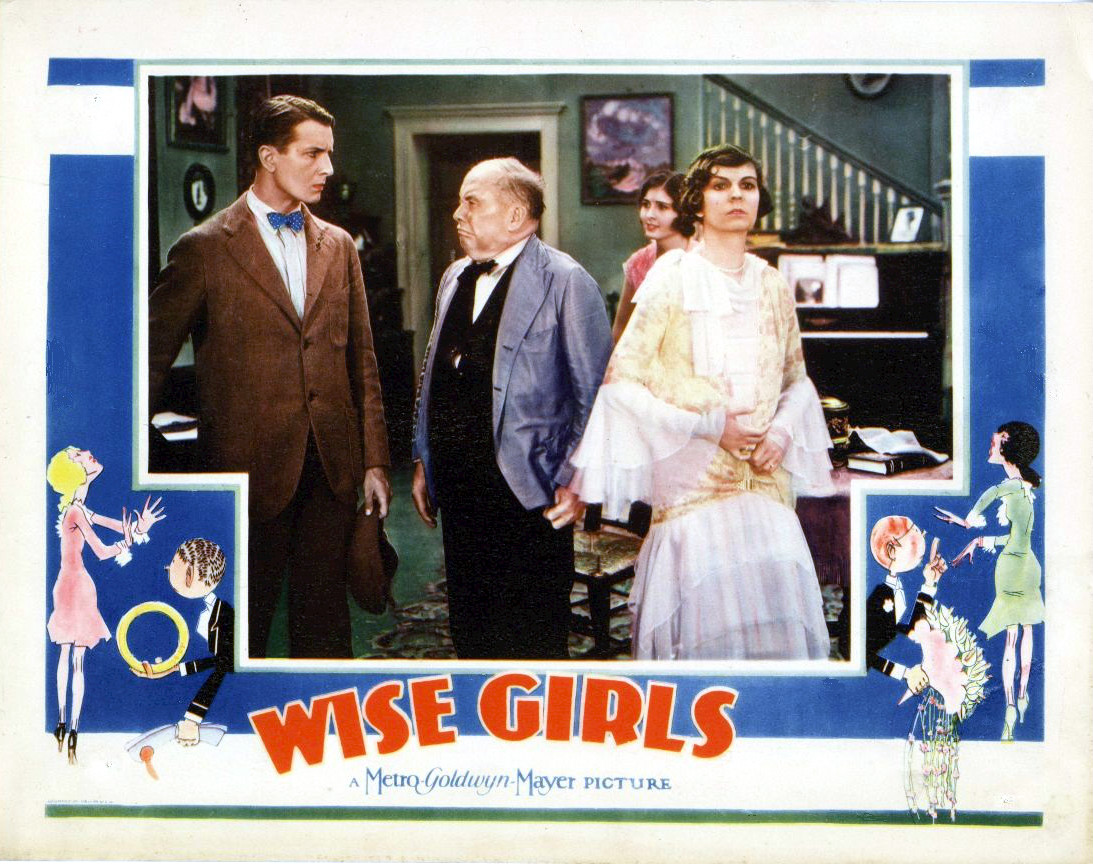
Lobby card showing Nugent (center) in Wise Girls (1929)

Year	Title	Role	Notes
1929	Wise Girls	Dad	
1929	Navy Blues	Mr. Brown	
1930	They Learned About Women	Stafford	
1930	The Big House	Mr. Marlowe	
1930	Love in the Rough	Waters	
1930	Remote Control	Horace V. Smedley	
1930	The Unholy Three		co-writer with Elliott Nugent
1931	Many a Slip	William Coster	
1931	The Virtuous Husband	Mr. Olwell	
1931	The Millionaire	Dr. Harvey	
1935	Love in Bloom	Col. 'Dad' Downey	
1935	Men Without Names	Major Newcomb	
1936	Modern Times	Department Store Section Manager	Uncredited
1937	A Star Is Born	Mr. Blodgett	
1937	This Is My Affair	Ernie	
1937	It's All Yours	E.J. Barnes	
1937	Life Begins in College	T. Edwin Cabot	
1937	Stand-In	Junior Pettypacker	
1938	Midnight Intruder	'Doc' Norton	
1938	Give Me a Sailor	Mr. Larkin	
1943	Follies Girl	J.B. Hamlin	(final film role)
