= It's All Yours =

1937 film by Elliott Nugent

- Directed by: Elliott Nugent
- Screenplay by: Mary C. McCall Jr.
- Story by: Adelaide Heilbron
- Produced by: William Perlberg
- Starring: Madeleine Carroll; Francis Lederer; Mischa Auer
- Cinematography: Henry Freulich
- Edited by: Gene Havlick
- Music by: Morris Stoloff
- Production company: Columbia Pictures
- Distributed by: Columbia Pictures
- Release date: September 1, 1937
- Running time: 80 minutes
- Country: United States
- Language: English

It's All Yours is a 1937 American comedy film directed by Elliott Nugent and starring Madeleine Carroll, Francis Lederer and Mischa Auer. It was produced and distributed by Columbia Pictures. It has sometimes been counted as a screwball comedy.

== Plot ==
Jimmy Barnes arrives from Europe to be educated by his multi-millionaire uncle, Edward J. Barnes and in five years the extravagant escapes of Jimmy, now a lawyer, are the talk of San Francisco. Linda Gray is a mouse-like secretary to the elder Barnes who has fallen in love with Jimmy, but he favors actress Constance "Connie" Marlowe. Mr. Barnes dies and leaves everything to Linda but he has urged his partner, Alexander Duncan, to plan things so that Jimmy and Linda will get married. Coached by Duncan, Linda accepts the inheritance and announces that she is departing for New York on a wild spending spree. He tells Jimmy that the will can be broken but only after many months and he suggests that Jimmy follow Linda and curb her spending or there won't be any money left. In New York, Linda hires Jimmy as her private secretary. Connie also arrives in New York, as does the ingenious Baron Rene de Montigny with the intention of marrying the wealthy Miss Gray. Linda keeps Jimmy so busy he can't see Connie, while she, to make Jimmy jealous, starts dating Rene. When Rene proposes, she tells him she has no money and he says he couldn't marry a poor girl but will coach her into how to catch Jimmy. The latter, now jealous, rushes to Linda's apartment and attacks Rene who, being the amateur prize fighter champion of France, knocks him out. Source IMBD

== Cast ==
- Madeleine Carroll as Linda Gray
- Francis Lederer as Jimmy Barnes
- Mischa Auer as Baron Rene de Montigny
- Grace Bradley as Constance Marlowe
- Victor Kilian as City Clerk
- George McKay as License Clerk
- Charles Waldron as Alexander Duncan
- J.C. Nugent as E.J. Barnes
- Richard Carle as Judge Reynolds
- Arthur Hoyt as Dabney

== Bibliography ==
- Halbout, Grégoire. Hollywood Screwball Comedy 1934-1945: Sex, Love, and Democratic Ideals. Bloomsbury Publishing, 2022.
- Pascoe, John. Madeleine Carroll: Actress and Humanitarian, from The 39 Steps to the Red Cross. McFarland, 2020.
- Sikov, Ed. Screwball: Hollywood's Madcap Romantic Comedies. Crown Publishers, 1989.
