= The Final Edition =

1932 film

- Directed by: Howard Higgin
- Written by: Roy Chanslor; Dorothy Howell
- Starring: Pat O'Brien; Mae Clarke; Morgan Wallace
- Cinematography: Joseph Walker
- Edited by: Jack Dennis
- Production company: Columbia Pictures
- Distributed by: Columbia Pictures
- Release date: February 12, 1932
- Running time: 66 minutes
- Country: United States
- Language: English

The Final Edition is a 1932 pre-Code American crime tragedy film directed by Howard Higgin and starring Pat O'Brien, Mae Clarke and Morgan Wallace. Made by Columbia Pictures, it is based on a story by Roy Chanslor.

== Synopsis ==
The squabbling city editor and a hotshot female reporter eventually join forces to try to bring down a major crime syndicate, responsible for the murder of the new police commissioner.

== Cast ==
- Pat O'Brien as Sam 'Brad' Bradshaw
- Mae Clarke as Ann Woodman
- Morgan Wallace as Neil Selby
- Bradley Page as Sid Malvern
- Mary Doran as Patsy King
- James Donlan as Freddie
- Phil Tead as Dan Cameron - Reporter
- Robert Emmett O'Connor as Police Lieutenant Daniels
- Bertha Mann as Jane Conroy
- Wallis Clark as Police Commissioner Jim Conroy
- Lydia Knott as Jim Conroy's Mother
- Bill Elliott as Reporter
- Harry Holman as Harry - Newspaperman
- Hal Price as Dave - Bradshaw's Assistant
- Harry Strang as First Selby Hood
- Kit Guard as Second Selby Hood

== Bibliography ==
- Langman, Larry. The Media in the Movies: A Catalog of American Journalism Films, 1900-1996. McFarland & Company, 1998.
