= Anita Page =

American actress (1910–2008)

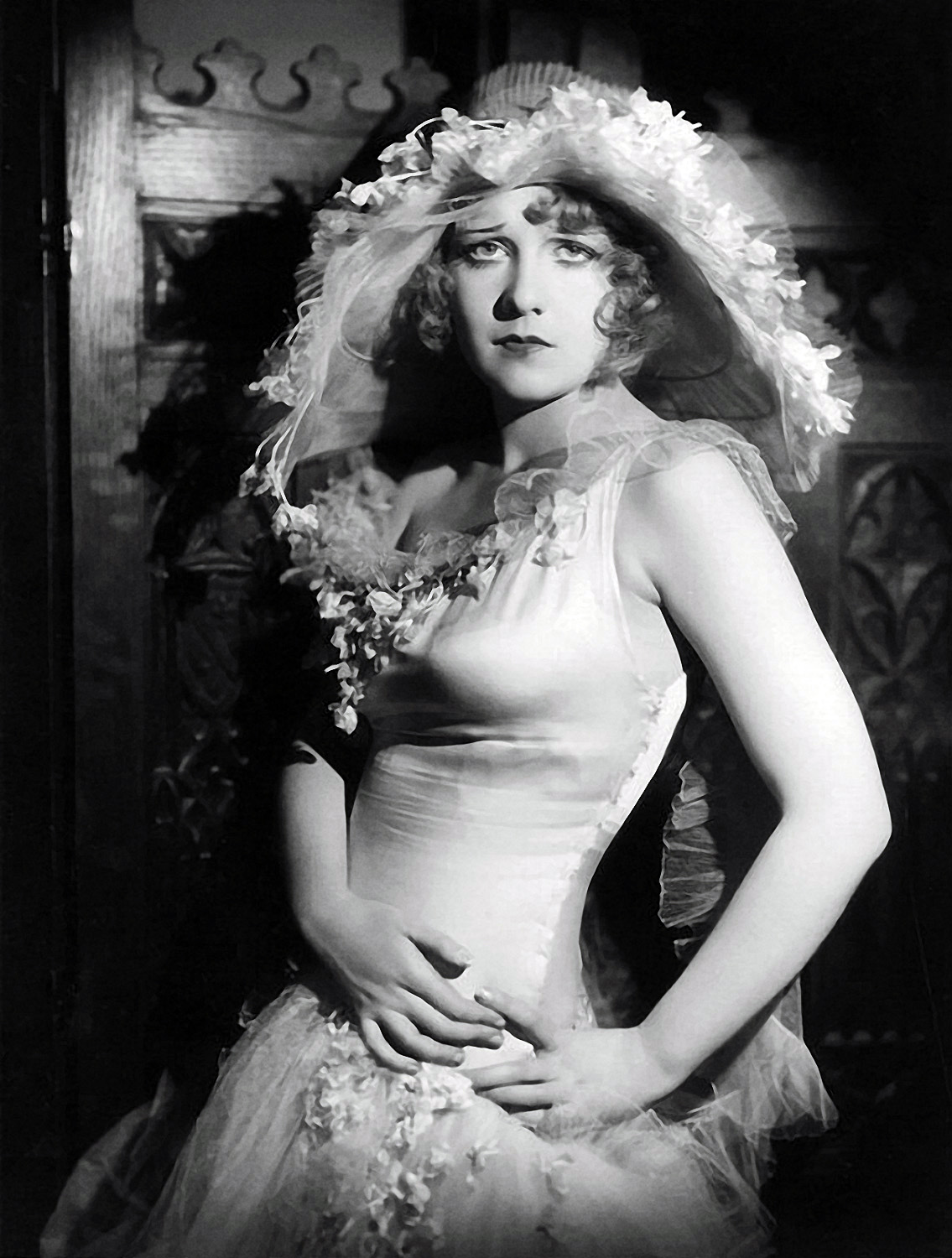
- Page in Our Modern Maidens (1929)
- Born: Anita Evelyn Pomares; August 4, 1910; New York City, U.S.
- Died: September 6, 2008 (aged 98); Los Angeles, California, U.S.
- Resting place: Holy Cross Cemetery, San Diego, California
- Occupation: Actress
- Years active: 1925–1936; 1961; 1996–2008
- Spouses: Nacio Herb Brown (m. 1934; div. 1935) Herschel A. House (m. 1937; died 1991)
- Children: 2

Anita Page (born Anita Evelyn Pomares; August 4, 1910 – September 6, 2008) was an American film actress who reached stardom in the final years of the silent film era.

Page was referred to as "a blond, blue-eyed Latin" and "the girl with the most beautiful face in Hollywood" in the 1920s. She retired from acting in 1936, made a comeback in 1961, then retired again. Page returned to acting 35 years later in 1996 and appeared in four films in the 2000s.

== Early life ==
Anita Evelyn Pomares was born on August 4, 1910, in Flushing, Queens, New York. Her parents were Marino Leo Pomares, who was originally from Brooklyn, and Maude Evelyn (née Mullane) Pomares. She had one brother, Marino Pomares Jr., who later worked for her as a gym instructor, and her mother worked as her secretary and her father as her chauffeur. Page's paternal grandfather, Salvador Marino Pomares, was from Cuba, and had worked as a consul in El Salvador. Her paternal grandmother Anna Muñoz was Venezuelan, of Castilian Spanish and French descent.

== Career ==
=== Silent films and early talkies ===
Page entered films with the help of a friend, actress Betty Bronson. A photo of Page was spotted by a man who handled Bronson's fan mail who was also interested in representing actors. With the encouragement of her mother, Page telephoned the man who arranged a meeting for her with a casting director at Paramount Studios. After doing a screen test for Paramount, she became among the first residents of the Chateau Marmont. Page was offered contracts by both studios and selected MGM, "because they were so good for female actresses. If you ask me, MGM was the studio."

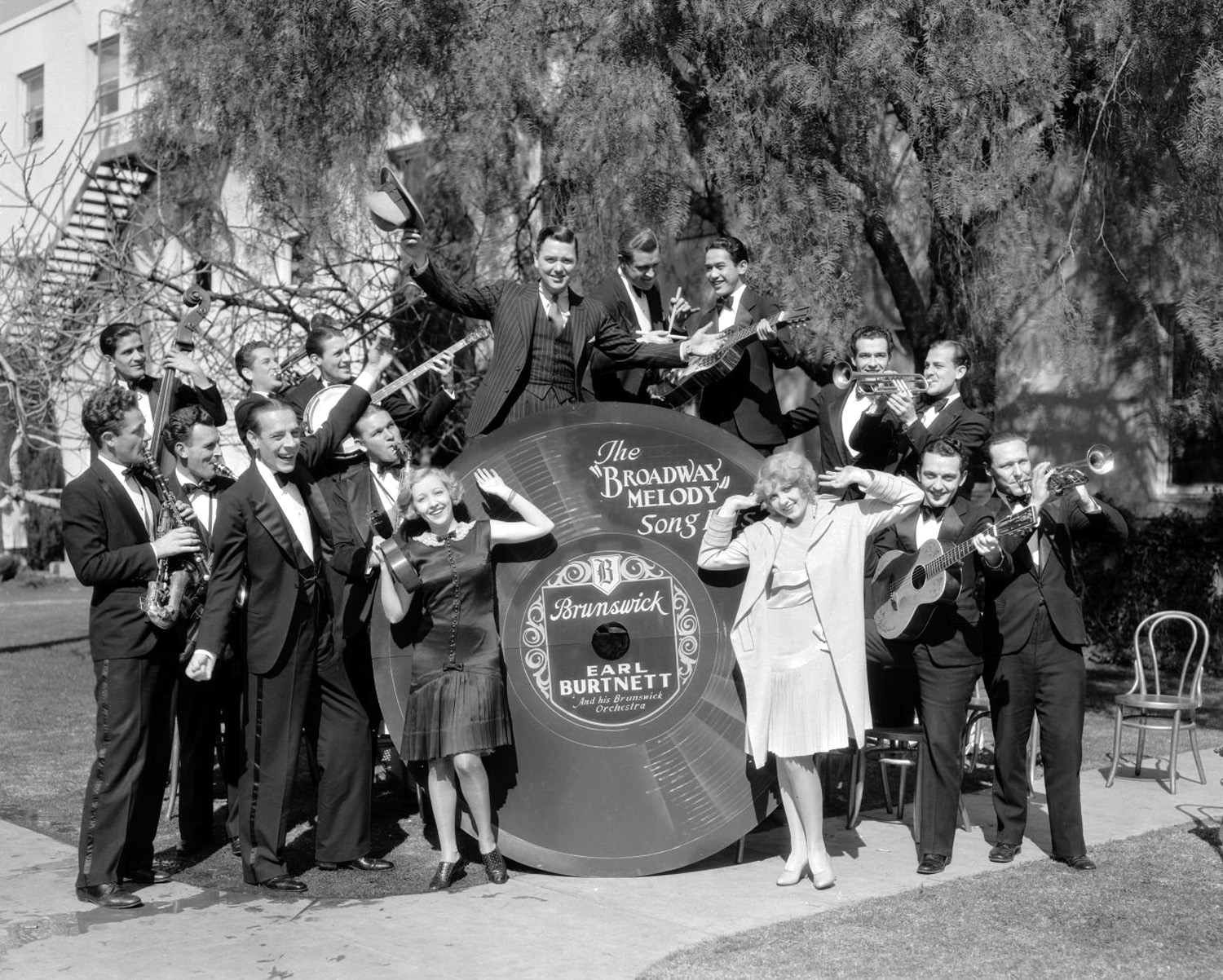
Page (in white) promoting The Broadway Melody in 1929

Page's first film for MGM was the 1928 comedy-drama Telling the World, opposite William Haines. Her performance in her second MGM film, Our Dancing Daughters (1928) opposite Joan Crawford, was a success that inspired two similar films in which they also co-starred: Our Modern Maidens and Our Blushing Brides. "I used to say that we're going to be 'The Galloping Grandmothers' at the rate we're going with these pictures," she reminisced in 1993.

The Broadway Melody (1929) is considered among her more successful films; it won Best Picture at the second annual Academy Awards. Page transitioned to sound films, although she criticized the total loss of silents. "In my opinion, silents were much better than talkies. One thing you had was mood music, which you could have playing throughout your scene to inspire you. My favorite song was 'My Heart at Thy Sweet Voice' from Samson and Delilah. I never seemed to tire of it. The trouble with talkies was, they let you have the music, but they'd stop it when you had to talk, and it was always a let down for me."

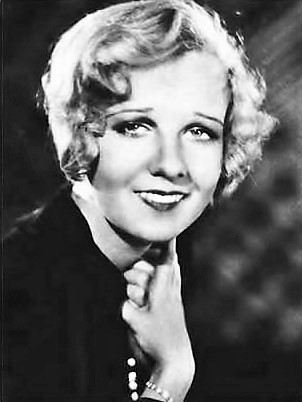
Page in 1930

When not working on films, she was busy with studio photographer George Hurrell creating publicity shots. She was one of his early subjects, and her photograph was his first to be published. MGM played up her heritage in these press releases such as this 1932 blurb: "She is that rarest and most interesting type of beauty...A Spanish blonde" and dubbed her "a blonde, blue-eyed Latin".

During the early 1930s, she was one of Hollywood's busier actresses. She was the leading lady to Lon Chaney, Buster Keaton, Robert Montgomery, Clark Gable and others. It has been said that was involved romantically with Gable briefly during that time, although there is no specific evidence of this. She said she worked with him and liked him but nothing more. At the height of her popularity, she received more fan mail than any other female star except Greta Garbo and received several marriage proposals from Benito Mussolini in the mail.

=== Retirement ===
When her contract expired in 1933, she announced her retirement from acting at the age of 23 because she'd been denied a pay raise. She made one more movie, Hitch Hike to Heaven, in 1936 and then retired fully from acting. Later, Page claimed that Irving Thalberg had offered her the starring role in three movies if she would sleep with him, which she refused.

=== Return to acting ===
Page came back to acting and portrayed a nun in The Runaway, completed in 1961, but she cut short her comeback. She returned to acting in 1996 after 35 years of retirement and appeared in several low-budget horror films. Film veteran Margaret O'Brien appeared in two of them.

== Legacy ==
For her contribution to the motion picture industry, Anita Page has a star on the Hollywood Walk of Fame at 6116 Hollywood Boulevard.

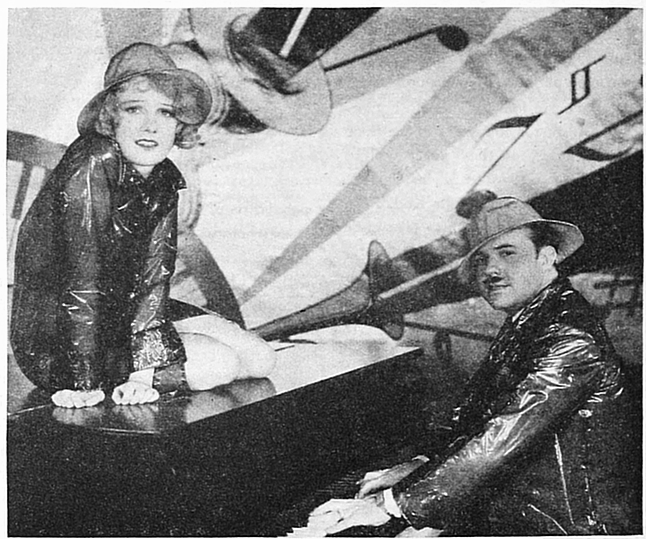
Page with her first husband, Nacio Herb Brown, in 1929

== Personal life ==
Page dated Ramon Novarro, her co-star in the 1929 silent film The Flying Fleet, and he asked her to marry him but she turned him down.

She married composer Nacio Herb Brown in 1934. The marriage was annulled nine months later because Brown's previous divorce had not been finalized at the time they were married. Page admitted that she had never loved Brown and that she only married him because she had nothing else to do. She married Navy pilot Lieutenant Hershel A. House on January 9, 1937, in Yuma, Arizona. They moved to Coronado, California and lived there until his death in 1991. They had two daughters, Linda and Sandra.

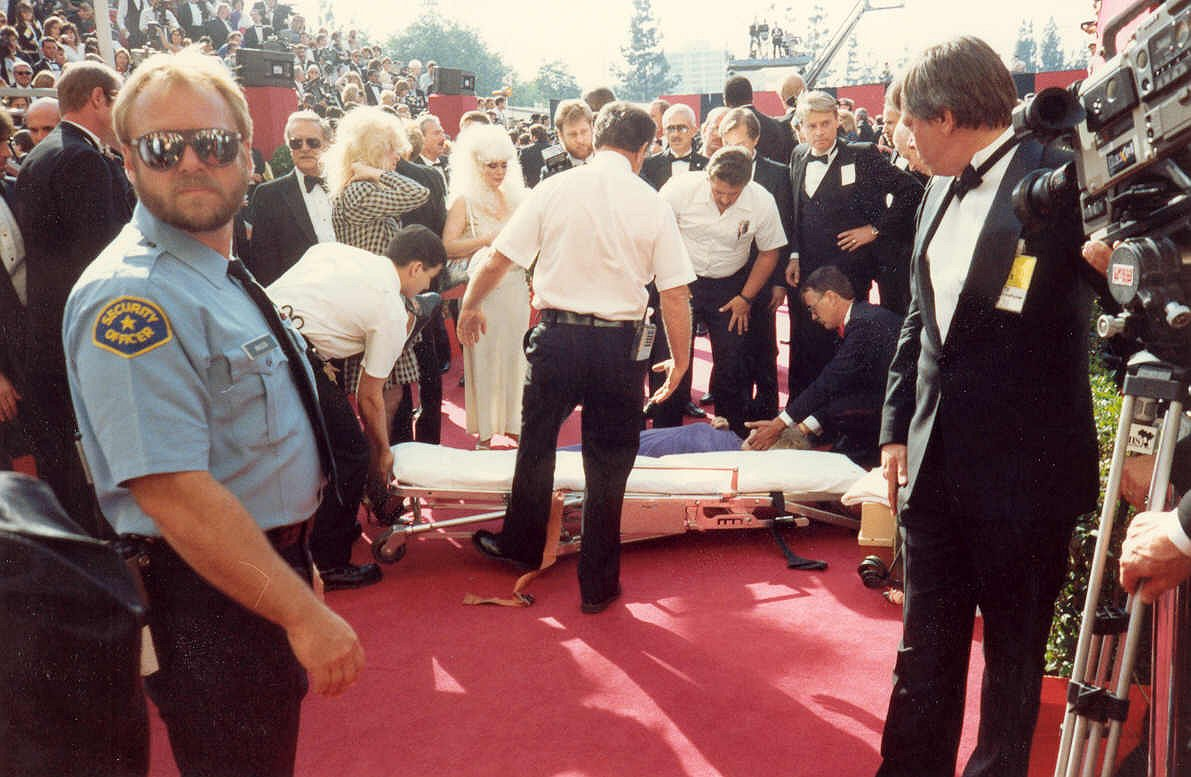
An unconscious Page surrounded after her collapse at the 60th Academy Awards in 1988

Page was the last living attendee of the first Academy Awards ceremony in 1929, and frequently gave interviews as the "last star of the silents", appearing in documentaries about the era. She collapsed at the 1988 Academy Awards ceremony and was rushed to Good Samaritan Hospital, where she was said to be in stable condition. A spokesperson reported she had fainted because of a "combination of things--the heat, exhaustion, the excitement."

Page died in her sleep on September 6, 2008, at her home in Van Nuys, Los Angeles, where she had lived with long-time companion Randal Malone. She was 98 Page is buried in the Holy Cross Cemetery in San Diego alongside House.

== Filmography ==
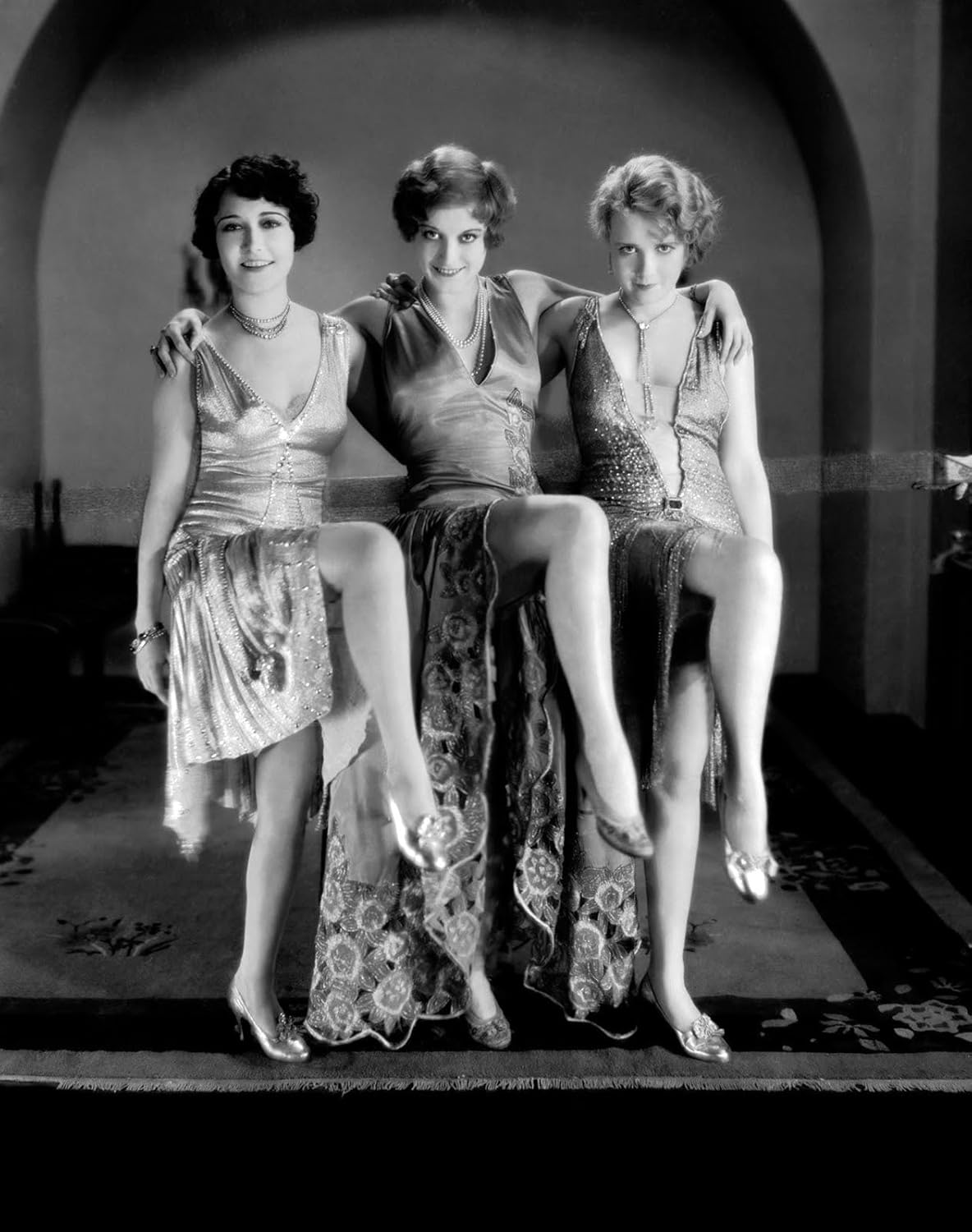
Dorothy Sebastian, Joan Crawford, and Page in Our Dancing Daughters (1928)

Year	Title	Role	Notes
1925	A Kiss for Cinderella		Uncredited
1926	Love 'Em and Leave 'Em		Uncredited
1927	Beach Nuts		Short
1928	Telling the World	Chrystal Malone	
1928	Our Dancing Daughters	Ann 'Annikins'	
1928	While the City Sleeps	Myrtle	portions of 2 reels are missing
1928	West of Zanzibar	bit role	uncredited
1929	The Flying Fleet	Anita Hastings	
1929	The Broadway Melody	Queenie Mahoney	alternative title: The Broadway Melody of 1929
1929	The Hollywood Revue of 1929	herself	
1929	Our Modern Maidens	Kentucky Strafford	
1929	Speedway	Patricia	
1929	Navy Blues	Alice "Allie" Brown	
1930	Free and Easy	Elvira Plunkett	alternative title: Easy Go
1930	Caught Short	Genevieve Jones	
1930	Our Blushing Brides	Connie Blair	
1930	The Little Accident	Isabel	
1930	War Nurse	Joy Meadows	
1930	Great Day		Incomplete
1930	Estrellados	herself	uncredited
1931	The Voice of Hollywood No. 7 (Second Series)	herself	short
1931	Wir schalten um auf Hollywood	herself	uncredited
1931	Reducing	Vivian Truffle	
1931	The Easiest Way	Peg Murdock Feliki	
1931	Gentleman's Fate	Ruth Corrigan	
1931	Sidewalks of New York	Margie Kelly	
1931	Under Eighteen	Sophie	
1932	Are You Listening?	Sally O'Neil	
1932	Night Court	Mary Thomas	alternative title: Justice for Sale
1932	Skyscraper Souls	Jenny LeGrande	
1932	Prosperity	Helen Praskins Warren	
1933	Jungle Bride	Doris Evans	
1933	Soldiers of the Storm	Natalie	
1933	The Big Cage	Lilian Langley	
1933	I Have Lived	Jean St. Clair	alternative titles: After Midnight; Love Life
1936	Hitch Hike to Heaven	Claudia Revelle	alternative title: Footlights and Shadows
1961	The Runaway	Nun	
1996	Sunset After Dark	Anita Bronson	
1998	Creaturealm: From the Dead	herself	segment "Hollywood Mortuary"
2000	Witchcraft XI: Sisters in Blood	Sister Seraphina	direct-to-DVD release
2002	The Crawling Brain	Grandma Anita Kroger	direct-to-DVD release
2004	Bob's Night Out	Socialite	
2010	Frankenstein Rising	Elizabeth Frankenstein	released posthumously
2019	Doctor Stein	Elizabeth Stein	released posthumously; archive footage
