= Give Me a Sailor =

1938 film by Elliott Nugent

- Theatrical release poster
- Directed by: Elliott Nugent
- Screenplay by: Doris Anderson; Frank Butler
- Story by: Anne Nichols
- Based on: Linger Longer Letty; 1919 play by Anne Nichols
- Produced by: Harold Hurley; Jeff Lazarus
- Starring: Martha Raye; Bob Hope; Betty Grable; Jack Whiting
- Cinematography: Victor Milner
- Edited by: William Shea
- Production company: Paramount Pictures
- Distributed by: Paramount Pictures
- Release date: August 19, 1938
- Running time: 80 minutes
- Country: United States
- Language: English

Give Me a Sailor is a 1938 American musical comedy film directed by Elliott Nugent and starring Martha Raye, Bob Hope, Betty Grable and Jack Whiting. This was Raye and Hope's third film together, the first in which they played the leads.

== Plot ==
Jim and Walter Brewster are brothers and naval officers; both of whom are in love with Nancy Larkin, much to the chagrin of Nancy's sister Letty. Walter has the inside track with Nancy, but Jim & Letty conspire to keep them apart. There are various comic shenanigans and a "Beautiful Legs" contest that Letty enters in error, but wins and becomes an instant celebrity. Fame and fortune are showered upon her and she and Jim realize that they are meant for each other.

== Cast ==
- Martha Raye as Letty Larkin
- Bob Hope as Jim Brewster
- Betty Grable as Nancy Larkin
- Jack Whiting as Walter Brewster
- Clarence Kolb as Captain Tallant
- J.C. Nugent as Mr. Larkin
- Bonnie Jean Churchill as Ethel May Brewster
- Nana Bryant as Mrs. Minnie Brewster

== See also ==
- List of American films of 1938
