= They Learned About Women =

1930 film by Jack Conway & Sam Wood

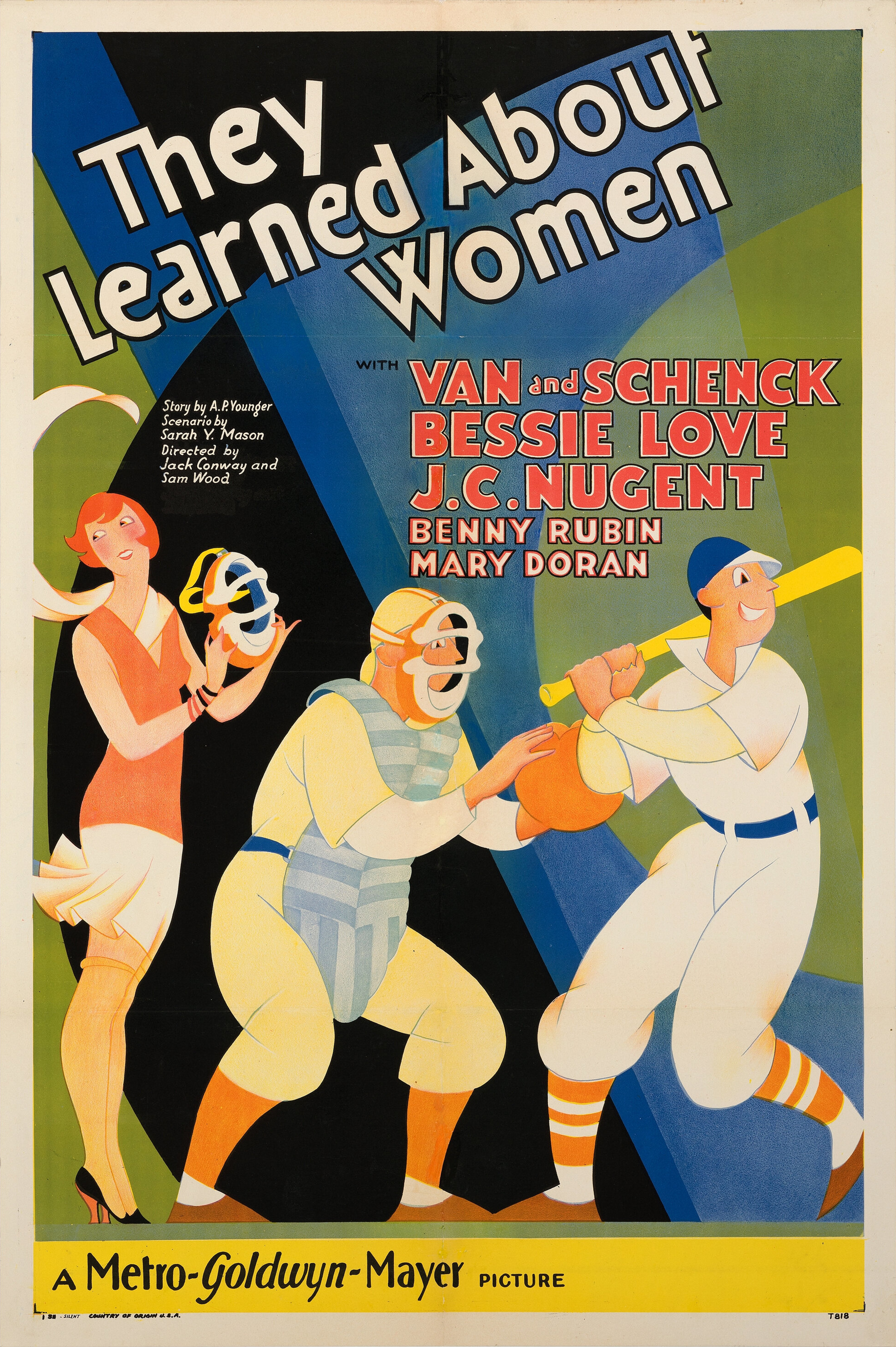
- Directed by: Jack Conway; Sam Wood
- Written by: A.P. Younger; Sarah Y. Mason
- Starring: Van and Schenck; Bessie Love; J. C. Nugent
- Cinematography: Leonard Smith
- Edited by: James C. McKay; Tom Held
- Music by: Milton Ager (composer); Jack Yellen (lyricist)
- Distributed by: Metro-Goldwyn-Mayer
- Release date: January 31, 1930 (U.S.)
- Running time: 95 minutes
- Country: United States
- Language: English

They Learned About Women is a 1930 American Pre-Code sports drama musical film directed by Jack Conway and Sam Wood, and starring Van and Schenck in their final film appearance together.

Although predominantly a black and white film, the "Harlem Madness" number was filmed in Technicolor under the direction of Sammy Lee. The film is a "talkie", but MGM also issued it in a silent version, with Alfred Block writing the titles. The film was remade in 1949 as Take Me Out to the Ball Game. During production, it was known by at least two other titles, "Take It Big," and "Playing the Field."

The film entered the American public domain on January 1, 2026 when its copyright expired.

== Plot ==
The film.

Major league baseball player Jack Glennon watches out for alcoholic teammate Jerry Burke. Both men are interested in Mary, but Jack marries the gold-digging Daisy, who lures him away from baseball to the vaudeville stage.

Later, Jerry and Mary become romantically involved, and Jack rejoins the baseball team after divorcing Daisy. Jerry notices that Jack is not playing well and is unhappy, and realizes that he must still be in love with Mary. He steps away from Mary, allowing her to be with Jack. Jack plays baseball well once again, and the team wins the World Series.

== Cast ==
- Gus Van as Jerry Burke
- Joe Schenck as Jack Glennon
- Bessie Love as Mary Collins
- J. C. Nugent as Stafford
- Benny Rubin as Sam Goldberg
- Mary Doran as Daisy Gebhart
- Tom Dugan as Tim O'Connor
- Eddie Gribbon as Brennan
- Ralph Bushman as Home Run Haskins
- Graham McNamee as himself

== Reception ==
The film received lukewarm reviews.

== Censorship ==
Before They Learned About Women could be exhibited in Kansas, the Kansas Board of Review required the elimination of a scene where the leader of a group of black chorus girls was doing "excessive wiggling."

== Soundtrack ==
Music for the film was composed by Milton Ager with lyrics by Jack Yellen, unless otherwise noted.

- "Ain't You, Baby?", performed by Gus Van
- "Does My Baby Love?", performed by Gus Van and Joe Schenck
- "Harlem Madness", performed by Gus Van and Joe Schenck; reprised by Nina Mae McKinney and chorus in Technicolor
- "He's That Kind of a Pal", performed twice by Gus Van and Joe Schenck
- "A Man of My Own", performed by Bessie Love
- "Ten Sweet Mamas", performed by Gus Van, Joe Schenck, and ball players
- "There Will Never Be Another Mary", performed by Joe Schenck
- "Dougherty Is the Name", lyrics by Yellen and Gus Van; performed by Gus Van and Joe Schenck
- "I'm an Old-Fashioned Guy", lyrics by Yellen and Gus Van; performed by Gus Van and Joe Schenck
- "When You Wore a Tulip and I Wore a Big Red Rose" (1924, music by Percy Wenrich, lyrics by Jack Mahoney), sung by the players in the hotel lobby
- "When You Were Sweet Sixteen" (1898, by James Thornton), sung partially by Tom Dugan and Benny Rubin

== See also ==
- List of baseball films
- List of early color feature films
