= Soldiers of the Storm =

1933 film

- Film poster
- Directed by: D. Ross Lederman
- Written by: Thomson Burtis; Charles R. Condon; Horace McCoy
- Starring: Regis Toomey; Anita Page; Robert Ellis
- Cinematography: Ted Tetzlaff
- Edited by: Maurice Wright
- Production company: Columbia Pictures
- Distributed by: Columbia Pictures
- Release dates: March 1933 (Limited); May 6, 1933 (Los Angeles); May 16, 1933 (New York)
- Running time: 68 minutes
- Country: United States
- Language: English

Soldiers of the Storm is a 1933 American pre-Code crime film directed by D. Ross Lederman and starring Regis Toomey, Anita Page and Robert Ellis.

== Plot ==
When a new airport opens in a town close to the Mexican border, the U.S. Border Patrol recruits pilot Brad Allerton to investigate potential drug smuggling while undercover.

== Cast ==
- Regis Toomey as Brad Allerton
- Anita Page as Natalie
- Robert Ellis as Moran
- Wheeler Oakman as George
- Barbara Barondess as Sonia
- Dewey Robinson as Chuck Bailey
- George Cooper as Red Gurney
- Arthur Wanzer as Adams
- Barbara Weeks as Spanish waitress
- Henry Wadsworth as Dodie

== Reception ==
In a contemporary review for The New York Times, critic Mordaunt Hall and wrote: "'Soldiers of the Storm' is a popular type of melodrama, which, although it cannot boast of much in the way of subtlety, has plenty of action. No time is lost in creating a certain brand of excitement."
