= Waldemar Young =

American screenwriter

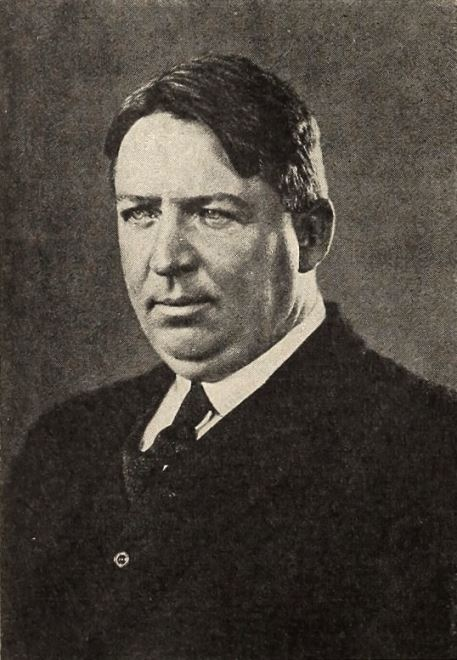
- Young in Exhibitors Trade Review, January 1924
- Born: July 1, 1878; Salt Lake City, Utah, USA
- Died: August 30, 1938 (aged 60); Hollywood, California, USA
- Education: Stanford University (dropped out)
- Occupation: Screenwriter
- Years active: 1917–1938
- Spouse: Elizabeth Haight (m. 1912)
- Family: Mahonri Young (brother); Brigham Young (grandfather); Samuel Brannan (great-uncle-in-law)

Waldemar Young (July 1, 1878 – August 30, 1938) was an American screenwriter. He wrote for more than 80 films between 1917 and 1938.

== Biography ==
He was born in Salt Lake City, Utah and died in Hollywood, California from pneumonia. Waldemar was a grandson of Brigham Young. He was also a brother of Mahonri Young.

Young joined the staff of the Salt Lake Herald after he graduated from high school. He then went to Stanford University starting in 1900. At Stanford, he played on the football team. He majored in English but also studied economics and history. Young did not finish his studies at Stanford. Instead, he took jobs with the San Francisco Chronicle and the San Francisco Examiner.

In 1912, Young married Elizabeth Haight, who was a great-niece of the early California Mormon leader Sam Brannan. Young started into films by writing comedy routines for Franklyn Farnum and Brownie Vernon.

In the 1920s, he often worked on films with Lon Chaney, Tod Browning, and their editor Errol Taggart.

In the 1930s, Young wrote several screenplays for Cecil B. DeMille.

== Partial filmography ==
- The Car of Chance (1917)
- The Man Trap (1917)
- The High Sign (1917)
- The Clean-Up (1917)
- The Show Down (1917)
- A Stormy Knight (1917)
- Flirting with Death (1917)
- New Love for Old (1918)
- The Flash of Fate (1918)
- Brace Up (1918)
- Fast Company (1918)
- The Wicked Darling (1919)
- The Unpainted Woman (1919)
- The Millionaire Pirate (1919)
- The Spitfire of Seville (1919)
- The Petal on the Current (1919)
- The Sundown Trail (1919)
- Bonnie Bonnie Lassie (1919)
- Suds (1920)
- The Inferior Sex (1920)
- The Girl in the Web (1920)
- The Off-Shore Pirate (1921)
- Experience (1921)
- Cappy Ricks (1921)
- A Prince There Was (1921)
- Ebb Tide (1922)
- Our Leading Citizen (1922)
- If You Believe It, It's So (1922)
- Burning Sands (1922)
- Java Head (1923)
- You Can't Fool Your Wife (1923)
- Salomy Jane (1923)
- Poisoned Paradise: The Forbidden Story of Monte Carlo (1924)
- Dorothy Vernon of Haddon Hall (1924)
- The Dixie Handicap (1924)
- The Great Divide (1925)
- The Unholy Three (1925)
- The Mystic (1925)
- The Blackbird (1926)
- The Flaming Forest (1926)
- The Show (1927)
- Women Love Diamonds (1927)
- The Unknown (1927)
- London After Midnight (1927)
- The Trail of '98 (1928)
- The Big City (1928)
- Tide of Empire (1929)
- Where East Is East (1929)
- Sally (1929)
- Ladies Love Brutes (1930)
- The Girl of the Golden West (1930)
- Chances (1931)
- Penrod and Sam (1931)
- The Miracle Man (1932)
- Sinners in the Sun (1932)
- Love Me Tonight (1932)
- The Sign of the Cross (1932)
- Island of Lost Souls (1932)
- Men in White (1934)
- Cleopatra (1934)
- The Lives of a Bengal Lancer (1935)
- Poppy (1936)
- Man-Proof (1938)
- Test Pilot (1938)
