= Air Mail (film) =

1932 film directed by John Ford

- Theatrical film poster
- Directed by: John Ford
- Written by: Dale Van Every; Frank "Spig" Wead
- Produced by: Carl Laemmle Jr.
- Starring: Ralph Bellamy; Pat O'Brien; Gloria Stuart
- Cinematography: Karl Freund
- Edited by: Harry W. Lieb
- Music by: Gilbert Kurland
- Production company: Universal Pictures
- Distributed by: Universal Studios
- Release date: November 3, 1932
- Running time: 84 minutes
- Country: United States
- Language: English

Air Mail is a 1932 American pre-Code adventure film directed by John Ford, based on a story by Dale Van Every and Frank "Spig" Wead. The film stars Ralph Bellamy, Pat O'Brien and Gloria Stuart. A copy is preserved in the Library of Congress.

== Plot ==
Pilot Mike Miller owns and operates Desert Airport, an air mail base at the foot of the Rocky Mountains. He leads a group of young pilots who risk their lives flying through dangerous weather and over treacherous terrain to deliver air mail. When Joe Barnes crashes at the base, the other pilots attempt to retrieve the precious mail from the burning wreckage. Mike consoles his girlfriend Ruth, who is also Joe's sister. Mike now realizes that he has to hire a replacement, the reckless "Duke" Talbot.

Duke is a good pilot, but his bravado and affair with Irene, wife of fellow pilot "Dizzy" Wilkins, has the potential to cause irreparable damage to the tightly knit group of aviators. When Dizzy crashes and dies in a blinding snow storm, Mike chooses to take over the last leg of his flight in poor weather even though doctors have told him that his vision has deteriorated. When he also crashes during the blizzard, his distress call reveals that he is still alive, but trapped in an inaccessible mountain valley. Duke considers the rescue as a challenge, commandeering an aircraft and flying to the remote valley. He lands roughly, damaging his aircraft, but manages to fly out with Mike on board. As they reach Desert Airport, Duke knows he cannot land safely so he forces Mike to parachute before he crash-lands. As the ground crew pull him out of the wreck, Duke is badly injured, but alive.

== Cast ==
- Ralph Bellamy as Mike Miller
- Gloria Stuart as Ruth Barnes
- Pat O'Brien as "Duke" Talbot
- Slim Summerville as "Slim" McCune (as "Slim" Summerville)
- Lilian Bond as Irene Wilkins
- Russell Hopton as "Dizzy" Wilkins
- David Landau as "Pop"
- Leslie Fenton as Tony Dressel
- Frank Albertson as Tommy Bogan
- Hans Fuerberg as "Heinie" Kramer
- Thomas Carrigan as "Sleepy" Collins (as Tom Carrigan)
- William Daly as "Tex" Lane (Note: Ward Bond and character actor George Irving appeared in uncredited roles.)

== Production ==
Air Mail was primarily filmed at Universal Studios stages and back lots. A special stage was built to film miniature scenes where a gantry was constructed above the stage to allow models to fly over a large miniature set. (Note: Universal "John Fulton" Stage 27 also contains a large water tank and is still in operation.)

For Air Mail, pilot Paul Mantz outbid other pilots from the Associated Motion Picture Pilots, leading to a contract dispute that was taken to the American Federation of Labor. The decision to allow non-union member Mantz and his team of pilots to fly was dependent on an equal number of union pilots being hired for non-flying duties. Mantz flew a Curtiss-Wright Travel Air Model 16K in a spectacular stunt, flying through a hangar at the Bishop Airport, Bishop, California.

== Reception ==
Air Mail was well received in an era not far removed from a time when air mail pilots like Charles Lindbergh were idolized. Critical reviews praised the atmospheric settings and flying scenes, but had difficulties with the underlying personal dramas. In his review in The New York Times, Mourdant Hall noted, " 'Air Mail' is handicapped by sequences that are either too long or too melodramatic, but it atones partly for these shortcomings by interesting details of activities in a flying-station, which in this instance happens to be known as Desert Airport. This curious combination of compelling truths and incredible fiction has a group of characters who, as usual in similar tales, are either too noble or too shameful or callous."

The review in Variety echoed similar concerns. "(The) Picture is a fund of interesting atmosphere about the air mail service. Radio exchanges are coming in and going out all the time, couched in technical language such as 'Visibility zero, ceiling zero. Caution to all planes.' It's interesting enough, but in essence the producer has dramatized the air mail service first and slipped in a human story as a second thought."

In 2025, The Hollywood Reporter listed Air Mail as having the best stunts of 1931 to 1932.

== See also ==
- John Ford filmography
