= Are You Listening? (film) =

1932 film

- Directed by: Harry Beaumont
- Written by: Dwight Taylor
- Based on: Are You Listening? 1932 novel by J. P. McEvoy
- Starring: William Haines; Madge Evans; Anita Page
- Cinematography: Harold Rosson
- Edited by: Frank Sullivan
- Music by: William Axt
- Production company: Metro-Goldwyn-Mayer
- Distributed by: Loew's Inc.
- Release date: April 24, 1932
- Running time: 73 minutes
- Country: United States
- Language: English

Are You Listening? is a 1932 American pre-Code drama film directed by Harry Beaumont and starring William Haines, Madge Evans and Anita Page. It was based on the novel of the same name by J. P. McEvoy, published the same year.

== Plot ==
Radio writer Bill Grimes is in love with radio actress Laura O' Neill, and they enjoy harmless social activities together like roller-skating. But Bill is bitterly married to Alice, who dislikes him as much as he does her but they are unable to separate because, in the Depression, they can't afford separate domiciles. Alice demands that Bill stay home for their third wedding anniversary celebration so as not to humiliate her in front of another couple she's invited; at Laura's suggestion, Bill tries to soften her by a gift of stockings, but she criticizes them and the evening is wretched for him. He had to break a theater date with Laura to be there, and when he finally gets away to visit her she decides this can't work and breaks up with him. Laura lives with her sister Sally, who is practiced in dating rich men without compromising herself. Their younger, naive sister Honey comes to town avid to go out on double dates with Sally, but does not master the technique of furtively dumping her liquor, gets sloppy drunk and Sally must rescue her. Honey thinks a clubman means to marry her, but when he shows up for a lunch date he scoffs at the idea, says all men lie like that, and just wants to keep dating her even though he's engaged. She is consoled by her sisters and finds love with a nice guy at the station whose intentions are honourable. There is backstage comedy about an inept sound-effects man and a series of great love stories the sponsor, a bathtub magnate, dislikes because they're not about plumbing. Late in the story, Bill moves out into a hotel; he has lost his job because he's too depressed to write comedy, and can't send the money to Alice that he promised. She comes to confront him in his hotel room, they quarrel, and when he gives her a small, exasperated push without looking she falls, hits her head and dies. Bill thinks of calling the police, but instead panics and runs; he goes to say goodbye to Laura, and she decides to run with him. The police discover the body (offstage) very quickly, and the radio station manager decides to make a sensational story out of tracking down the "vicious murderer" and his "paramour". Bill and Laura get as far as Miami, but a gas station attendant has recognized them from the anodyne radio description and called the police, so that a newspaper editor they go to for help locks them in his office and calls the radio station. Bill thinks he is talking to a sympathetic colleague who will get him a lawyer, but he really puts the phone call with Bill on the air and spins it to say Bill confessed (he didn't). This apparently does no harm at Bill's trial, because we next find that he was just convicted of manslaughter. Laura meets him at the station on his way to prison and they cheer each other up with the reflection that his sentence is only three years, it could be reduced for good behavior, and "maybe the Depression will be over by then."

== Cast ==
- William Haines as Bill Grimes
- Madge Evans as Laura O'Neil
- Anita Page as Sally O'Neil
- Karen Morley as Alice Grimes
- Neil Hamilton as Jack Clayton
- Wallace Ford as Larry Barnes
- Jean Hersholt as George Wagner
- Joan Marsh as Honey O'Neil
- John Miljan as Ted Russell
- Murray Kinnell as Carson
- Ethel Griffies as Mrs Peters
- Hattie McDaniel as Singer
- Rolfe Sedan as Hotel Manager
- Louise Carter as Mrs O'Neil
- Charles Coleman as Butler
- Charley Grapewin as Pierce
- Frank Whitlock as Radio Announcer
- Herman Bing as Actor

== Production ==
Are You Listening? was William Haines' final film for Metro-Goldwyn-Mayer. The film was an attempt by the studio to revamp Bill's character. The film turned a small profit, although not as impressive as, New Adventures of Get Rich Quick Wallingford, (his previous film), and nowhere near the Haines grosses of old.
