= So This Is College =

1929 film

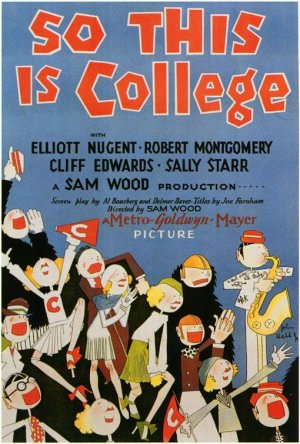
- Theatrical release poster designed by John Held Jr.
- Directed by: Sam Wood
- Screenplay by: Al Boasberg; Delmer Daves; Joseph Farnham
- Produced by: Sam Wood
- Starring: Elliott Nugent; Robert Montgomery; Cliff Edwards; Sally Starr; Phyllis Crane
- Cinematography: Leonard Smith
- Edited by: Frank Sullivan
- Music by: Martin Broones
- Production company: Metro-Goldwyn-Mayer
- Distributed by: Loew's Inc.
- Release date: November 8, 1929
- Running time: 98 minutes
- Country: United States
- Language: English

So This Is College is a 1929 American pre-Code comedy film directed by Sam Wood, written by Al Boasberg, Delmer Daves and Joseph Farnham, and starring Elliott Nugent, Robert Montgomery in his film debut, Cliff Edwards, Sally Starr and Phyllis Crane. It was released on November 8, 1929 by Metro-Goldwyn-Mayer.

== Plot ==
So This Is College (1929)

Biff and Eddie, two college classmates at the University of Southern California, are life-long friends, fraternity brothers, and members of the football team. Although they make a vow at the beginning of their senior year that they will no longer allow their pursuit of girls to get into the way of their friendship, they soon break their vow when both fall for pretty Babs Baxter, a popular co-ed. Vying for her affections, Biff and Eddie play pranks on each other that soon causes a serious breach in their relationship. When Eddie realizes Biff wants to marry Babs, he steps aside for the sake of their friendship, but at the season’s big football game, both men overhear Babs speaking with her fiancé, Bruce Nolan, who questions why she is wearing the fraternity pins given to her by Eddie and Biff; Babs dismisses them as meaningless and asks Bruce to return them, revealing to the boys that she has been toying with them all along. After winning the game, Biff and Eddie decide never again to let girls come between them—until they see another pretty girl in the park.

== Cast ==
- Elliott Nugent as Eddie
- Robert Montgomery as Biff
- Cliff Edwards as "Windy"
- Sally Starr as Babs
- Phyllis Crane as Betty
- Max Davidson as Moe
- Ann Brody as Momma
- Oscar Rudolph as "Freshie"
- Polly Moran as Polly
- Lee Shumway as Coach
- Joel McCrea as Bruce Nolan (uncredited)

== Production ==
Nugent said MGM made only two talking movies before this one.

== See also ==
- List of American football films
- List of early sound feature films (1926–1929)
