= Wise Girls (film) =

1929 film

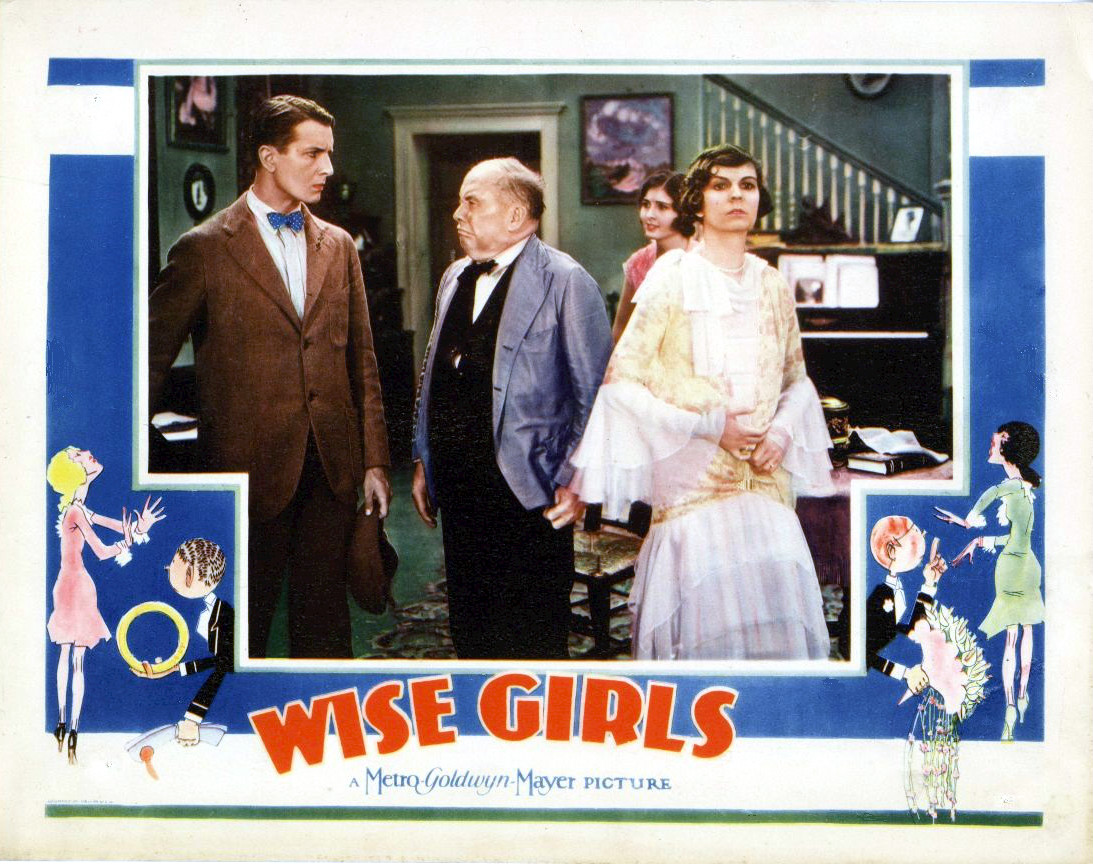
- Theatrical release poster
- Directed by: E. Mason Hopper
- Screenplay by: Margaret Booth; Elliott Nugent; J. C. Nugent
- Based on: Kempy; 1922 play by Elliott Nugent; J. C. Nugent
- Starring: Elliott Nugent; Norma Lee; Roland Young; J. C. Nugent; Clara Blandick
- Cinematography: William H. Daniels
- Edited by: Margaret Booth
- Production company: Metro-Goldwyn-Mayer
- Distributed by: Metro-Goldwyn-Mayer
- Release date: September 21, 1929
- Running time: 97 minutes
- Country: United States
- Language: English

Wise Girls is a 1929 American pre-Code comedy film directed by E. Mason Hopper and written by Margaret Booth, Elliott Nugent and J. C. Nugent. The film stars Elliott Nugent, Norma Lee, Roland Young, J. C. Nugent and Clara Blandick in her first talkie film. The film was released on September 21, 1929, by Metro-Goldwyn-Mayer.

== Plot summary ==
Wise Girls (1929)

== Cast ==
- Elliott Nugent as Kempy
- Norma Lee as Kate Bence
- Roland Young as Duke Merrill
- J. C. Nugent as Dad
- Clara Blandick as Ma
- Marion Shilling as Ruth Bence
- Leora Spellman as Jane Wade
- James Donlan as Ben Wade

== Production ==
The film was based on the play Kempy by Elliott and JC Nugent. Bernie Hyman bought the rights and hired Elliott Nugent to adapt and star. Elliott Nugent wrote, "We rehearsed for a week; by then all of the cast knew the play so well that the picture was shot in ten days. The name Kempy was changed, for some mystical reason, to Wise Girls. While it was not a big picture, it was profitable, and Dad and I were at once commissioned to write an original called The Sins of the Children."

== See also ==
- List of early sound feature films (1926–1929)
