= This Is My Affair =

1937 film by William A. Seiter

- Movie poster
- Directed by: William A. Seiter
- Written by: Kubec Glasmon (contributor to screenplay construction) (uncredited); Wallace Sullivan (contributor to treatment) (uncredited)
- Screenplay by: Allen Rivkin; Lamar Trotti
- Story by: Allen Rivkin; Lamar Trotti; Darryl F. Zanuck (uncredited)
- Produced by: Kenneth Macgowan
- Starring: Robert Taylor; Barbara Stanwyck; Victor McLaglen; Brian Donlevy
- Cinematography: Robert H. Planck
- Edited by: Allen McNeil
- Music by: Arthur Lange; Charles Maxwell
- Production company: 20th Century Fox
- Distributed by: 20th Century Fox
- Release date: May 28, 1937
- Running time: 100 minutes
- Country: United States
- Language: English

This Is My Affair is a 1937 American period crime film directed by William A. Seiter and starring Robert Taylor, Barbara Stanwyck, Victor McLaglen and Brian Donlevy. It was produced and released by 20th Century Fox.

== Plot ==
In 1901, US President William McKinley is put under great pressure by everyone, even US Bank Examiner Henry Maxwell, to do something about a gang of bank robbers nobody has been able to bring to justice. He sends U.S. Navy Lieutenant Richard L. Perry undercover without notifying anyone, not even the Secret Service.

Richard, using the alias Joe Patrick, makes a pass at singer Lil Duryea. Her stepbrother, Batiste, not only owns the casino in Saint Paul, Minnesota where she performs, but is also one of the ringleaders of the gang. Lil takes a liking to Joe, but since Batiste's hulking right-hand man, Jock Ramsay, considers her his girl, she tries to brush Joe off. Joe is undeterred and soon persuades her to go out with him whenever Batiste and Jock leave town on one of their robberies.

When Batiste learns that Lil loves Joe and is convinced that he is a bank robber himself, Batiste invites Joe to join the gang. Later, though, Lil tries to talk Joe into running away with her. He agrees, even writing a letter of resignation addressed to McKinley, but changes his mind. He has yet to learn the identity of the mastermind behind the whole thing. As a result, however, Lil breaks up with him.

Joe notifies the President about the next robbery, hoping that when they are caught, he can find out the boss's name. Batiste is killed and Jock wounded when they put up a fight.

In prison, Joe works on Jock, finally getting him to reveal that the Bank Examiner is the mastermind. However, McKinley is shot before getting Joe's letter. Nobody believes Joe's story, and both he and Jock are sentenced to death.

When Lil visits him, he confesses everything and begs her to go to see Admiral George Dewey. Embittered that he lied to her and got her stepbrother killed, Lil refuses, but as the executions near, she rushes to Dewey. Together, they go to see the new president, Theodore Roosevelt. He does not believe her until an official finally remembers McKinley instructing him to read a secret paper in the event of a letter being received with a certain symbol on it and him being unavailable. Convinced, Roosevelt telephones just after Jock's execution and before Joe's. Afterward, Joe and Lil are reunited.

== Cast ==
- Robert Taylor as Lt. Richard L. Perry
- Barbara Stanwyck as Lil Duryea
- Victor McLaglen as Jock Ramsay
- Brian Donlevy as Batiste Duryea
- Sidney Blackmer as President Theodore Roosevelt
- John Carradine as Ed
- Alan Dinehart as Doc Keller
- Douglas Fowley as Alec
- Robert McWade as Admiral Dewey
- Frank Conroy as President William McKinley
- Sig Ruman as Gus
- Marjorie Weaver as Miss Blackburn
- J.C. Nugent as Ernie
- Tyler Brooke as Specialty
- Willard Robertson as George Andrews
- Paul Hurst as Bowler
- Douglas Wood as Henry Maxwell
- John Hamilton as Warden
- Joseph Crehan as Priest
- Mary Young as Dowager
- Maurice Cass as Jeweler
- Jayne Regan as Girl with Roosevelt
- Ruth Gillette as Blonde
- Fred Santley as Boy
- DeWitt Jennings as Bradley Wallace
- Lon Chaney Jr. as Federal Agent (uncredited)
- Edward Peil Sr. as Secretary Hayes (uncredited)

== Reception ==
Writing for Night and Day in 1937, Graham Greene gave the film a good review, asserting that it was "the best American melodrama of the year". Although Greene notes the unrealistic aspects of the plot, he praises the "cunning direction" and expresses enjoyment of the tension-imbuing "sense of doom" present in many scenes. Greene also praised the acting of both Taylor and McLaglen.
