= Dale Van Every =

American journalist

Dale Van Every (July 23, 1896 in Van, Michigan – May 28, 1976 in Santa Barbara, California) was an American writer, film producer, and studio executive.

== Biography ==
Van Every's parents were Wilbert and Estella (Palmer) Van Every from Petoskey, Michigan. He graduated from a San Bernardino, California-area high school in 1914 and attended Stanford University.

When the United States entered World War I, "in his junior year he enlisted with the Stanford ambulance unit, serving overseas for about three years, first in the ambulance corps, later as a commissioned officer in the Convois Automobils [sic].

He graduated from Stanford in 1920 and went to work for the United Press news agency, first in New York, then around 1921, as a bureau chief in Harrisburg, Pennsylvania.

With Morris DeHaven Tracy, he wrote a biography of Charles Lindbergh which was published in 1927, the year Lindbergh made his famous solo trip across the Atlantic. He also wrote a number of historical non-fiction works, including a four-volume series on the American frontier experience. His first novel, Telling the World, was made into a 1928 movie of the same name; William Haines played a journalist who gets involved in a murder.

Van Every went to Hollywood to work on the film and began writing screenplays. In 1934, he was paid a salary of $52,500 by Paramount Pictures, $250 less than Mary Pickford and $1000 more than Walt Disney. Along with Marc Connelly and John Lee Mahin, he was nominated for the Academy Award for Best Adapted Screenplay for Captains Courageous (1937). He was one of seven Universal Pictures studio executives who worked for Carl Laemmle and his son Julius (Carl Jr.) Laemmle during the golden age of Universal-Laemmle ownership. Later, he also produced some films.

He married fellow Stanford graduate Ellen Mein Calhoun in April 1922. They had two children before "an interlocutory judgment of divorce was entered in the Superior Court of the State of California" in July 1935. According to his daughter, author Joan Van Every Frost, and as reported by historian Tony Burton, he married twice more: Florence Mason (1896-1969) sometime before 1940, and Frances Robinson Hess near the end of his life.

He died in 1976 at age 89.

== Partial filmography ==
- Telling the World (1928) – story
- Marianne (1929) – screenplay and story (silent and musical versions)
- Desert Nights (1929) – story
- The Duke Steps Out (1929) – adaptation
- Navy Blues (1929) – adaptation
- Those Three French Girls (1930) - story
- Trader Horn (1931) – adaptation
- East of Borneo (1931) – screenplay
- Murders in the Rue Morgue (1932) – screenplay
- Air Mail (1932) – screenplay
- Saturday's Millions (1933) - screenplay
- After Office Hours (1935) – story
- More Than a Secretary (1936) – screenplay
- Captains Courageous (1937) – screenplay
- Souls at Sea (1937) – screenplay
- Spawn of the North (1938) – uncredited screenplay construction
- Dr. Cyclops (1940) – producer
- The Talk of the Town (1942) – adaptation
- Sealed Cargo (1951) – screenplay
