= Elliott Nugent =

American actor, playwright, writer, and film director

- Nugent in a 1947 publicity photo
- Born: September 20, 1896; Dover, Ohio, U.S.
- Died: August 9, 1980 (aged 83); New York City, U.S.
- Spouse: Norma Lee (1921–1980; his death)
- Parent: J. C. Nugent (father)

Elliott Nugent (September 20, 1896 – August 9, 1980) was an American actor, playwright, writer, and film director. J. C. Nugent was his father.

== Life and career ==
Nugent was born in Dover, Ohio, the son of actor J.C. Nugent. He attended Ohio State University. He successfully made the transition from silent film to sound film. He directed The Cat and the Canary (1939), starring Bob Hope and Paulette Goddard. He also directed the Hope films Never Say Die (1939) and My Favorite Brunette (1947).

Nugent was a college classmate (and lifelong friend) of fellow Ohioan James Thurber. Together, they wrote the Broadway play The Male Animal (1940) in which Nugent starred with Gene Tierney. He also directed the 1942 film version starring Henry Fonda and Olivia de Havilland.

Nugent was the brother-in-law of actor Alan Bunce of Ethel and Albert fame.

Nugent died in his sleep at his New York home. His papers are archived at the New York Public Library.

== Partial list of stage works ==
- The Poor Nut (1925)
- The Male Animal (1940)
- Tomorrow the World (1943)
- Voice of the Turtle (1945)

== Partial filmography ==
- Headlines (1925) - Roger Hillman
- The Single Standard (1929) - Party Boy (uncredited)
- Wise Girls (1929) - Kempy
- So This Is College (1929) - Eddie
- Not So Dumb (1930) - Gordon
- The Sins of the Children (1930) - Johnnie Wagenkampf
- The Unholy Three (1930) (also writer, with J.C. Nugent) - Hector
- Romance (1930) - Harry
- For the Love o' Lil (1930) - Sandy Jenkins
- The Virtuous Husband (1931) - Daniel Curtis
- The Last Flight (1931) - Francis
- The Mouthpiece (1932, director)
- Life Begins (1932, co-director)
- Whistling in the Dark (1933, director)
- Three-Cornered Moon (1933, director) - Stock Broker (uncredited)
- If I Were Free (1933, director)
- Two Alone (1934, director)
- Strictly Dynamite (1934, director) - Performer (uncredited) (unbilled)
- She Loves Me Not (1934, director)
- Enter Madame (1935, director)
- Splendor (1935, director)
- Wives Never Know (1936, director)
- It's All Yours (1937, director)
- Thunder in the City (1937) - Casey (uncredited)
- Professor Beware (1938, director)
- Give Me a Sailor (1938, director)
- Never Say Die (1939, director)
- The Cat and the Canary (1939, director)
- Nothing But the Truth (1941, director)
- The Male Animal (1942, director)
- The Crystal Ball (1943, director)
- Stage Door Canteen (1943) - Himself
- Up in Arms (1944, director)
- My Favorite Brunette (1947, director)
- Welcome Stranger (1947, director) - Dr. Morton (uncredited)
- My Girl Tisa (1948, director) - Man on Boat (uncredited)
- Mr. Belvedere Goes to College (1949, director)
- The Great Gatsby (1949, director)
- The Skipper Surprised His Wife (1950, director)
- My Outlaw Brother (1951, director) - Ranger Captain (uncredited)
- Just for You (1952, director)
