= Robert Ivers =

American actor (1934–2003)

- publicity photo of Robert Ivers
- Born: Robert Prestlien; December 11, 1934; Seattle, Washington, United States
- Died: February 13, 2003 (aged 68); Yakima, Washington, United States
- Occupation: actor
- Years active: 1953–2003
- Spouse(s): Lenore Roberts (1961); Marcia Henderson (1961–1987)

Robert Ivers, also known as Bob Ivers, (December 11, 1934 – February 13, 2003) was an American actor who appeared in films and television in the 1950s and 1960s.

== Background ==
Ivers was born in Seattle, Washington. He attended Tucson High School from 1950 to 1953. He was offered scholarships to the Pasadena Playhouse and the University of Arizona. After short time at Pasadena, where the curriculum wouldn't allow him to appear on stage until his second year, he transferred to the University of Arizona where he began appearing in roles during his first year. During this time, he had a number of uncredited roles in films such as Broken Lance in 1954 and Violent Saturday in 1955. He was signed by Paramount Pictures in 1956 after he was seen performing the lead role in the play Tea and Sympathy.

== Film and television career ==
Ivers played a major role in the 1957 film The Delicate Delinquent, in which he co-starred with Jerry Lewis. In 1957 he also starred in Short Cut to Hell, the only film directed by James Cagney. He also co-starred in 1960 with Elvis Presley in G.I. Blues as Cookie, one of Elvis's army buddies stationed with him on base overseas. It was Presley's first film after coming home from the army. He appeared in a number of television series in the late 1950s and early 1960s, including the syndicated western, Pony Express. The timing of the program coincided with the 1960 centennial of the Pony Express. Ivers also appeared on The Fugitive starring David Janssen and Twelve O'clock High. He guest-starred on episodes of The Virginian, Bat Masterson, The Untouchables, and Gunsmoke. Ivers was disappointed that his acting career stalled by the middle 1960s, and he told the Yakima Herald-Republic in 1978 that he would have enjoyed the excitement of the Hollywood scene and often contemplated what might have been.

In 1965, he launched a career in television news at KPHO in Phoenix, Arizona, followed by WJIM in Lansing, Michigan, and then (in 1970) KTHI-TV in Fargo, North Dakota. After moving to his home state of Washington in 1972, he became a mainstay of KAPP in Yakima, Washington, where he anchored newscasts and hosted a Saturday morning children's program, the weekday Morning Moneyman Movie, and the station's annual participation in the Jerry Lewis MDA Telethon. After leaving KAPP, Ivers had a stint as newscaster at competing Yakima station KNDO. He then began his own advertising agency in Yakima and hosted a small syndicated radio show in central Washington which provided factual trivia about films and actors along with reviews.

== Personal life ==
Ivers married Lenore Roberts in 1961, but the marriage was annulled later that year. On 7 September 1961, he married actress Marcia Henderson. They had two daughters, Alenda and Mallory. Marcia died 23 November 1987 of lupus. Mallory, who was married to Steve Cangialosi, died on 19 October 2005.

Ivers died on 13 February 2003, at the age of 68 in Yakima, Washington.

== Awards ==
In August 2003, Ivers was voted Elvis Fans' Choice Award for Best Male Duo as the best Elvis movie sidekick during the Elvis Week festivities held annually in Memphis, Tennessee.

== Filmography ==
Film

- Broken Lance (1954) - Cowboy Working Cattle (uncredited)
- Ten Wanted Men (1955)
- Violent Saturday (1955) - Caddy, at Country Club (uncredited)
- A Kiss Before Dying (1956) - Student at Murder Scene (uncredited)
- The Delicate Delinquent (1957) - Monk
- Short Cut to Hell (1957) - Kyle Niles
- I Married a Monster from Outer Space (1958) - Harry Phillips
- G.I. Blues (1960) - Cookie
- The Errand Boy (1961) - Young NY Director Who Argues with T.P.
- Cattle King (1963) - Webb Carter
- The Young and The Brave (1963) - Pvt. Kirk Wilson
- The Patsy (1964) - Boy at Spring Hop (uncredited)
- Town Tamer (1965) - Cowboy

Television

- Gunsmoke (1959) - Johnny Asper
- The Untouchables (1959) - Herman Barker
- 77 Sunset Strip (1959-1962) - Danny Belmont / Nevin Williams
- Tombstone Territory (1960) - Eddie Casper
- Not For Hire (1960)
- Pony Express (1960) - Clarence McGroo / McGroo
- Hawaiian Eye (1960-1961) - Harvey Cross / Bobby Kramer
- Bat Masterson (1960-1961) - Charley Boy / Yaqui Kid
- Frontier Circus (1962) - Sandy MacNeil
- Bachelor Father (1962) - Joby
- The Virginian (1964) - Vance Clayton
- Mister Roberts (1966) - Kearney / Bob, a seaman
- The Fugitive (1966) - Dave
- The F.B.I. (1966) - First Special Agent
- Twelve O'Clock High (1966) - Reporter / B-17 Pilot
