= This Gun for Hire (1991 film) =

American TV movie

- Genre: Crime
- Directed by: Lou Antonio
- Starring: Robert Wagner; Nancy Everhard
- Composer: Dana Kaproff
- Country of origin: United States
- Original language: English

Production
- Cinematography: Tom Neuwirth
- Editor: Gary Griffin
- Running time: 100 minutes
- Production company: MCA Television Entertainment

Original release
- Network: USA Network
- Release: January 9, 1991

This Gun for Hire is a 1991 American TV movie. It is an adaptation of A Gun for Sale by Graham Greene which had been filmed several times previously, notably with Alan Ladd in 1942. It was directed by Lou Antonio for the USA Network. It starred Robert Wagner who in 2000 said it was one of his favorite roles.

== Cast ==
- Robert Wagner
- Nancy Everhard
- Patrik Baldauff
- Lenore Banks
- James Borders
- Dean Cochran
- George Jones
- Fredric Lehne
- Joe Warfield

== Reception ==
The Vancouver Sun said "the unlikely romance between Wagner and his stripper hostage, played by Nancy Everhard, never ignites. Wagner's cold and wooden presence only makes Everhard's efforts to seduce him appear ridiculously contrived." The reviewer added what makes the fl "worth watching is a wonderful performance by John Harkins."

The Chicago Tribune wrote "Many viewers may, in fact, find themselves made uncomfortable as they watch the sleek and sophisticated Wagner try to get down and dirty."
