= Short Cut to Hell =

1957 film by James Cagney

- Theatrical release poster
- Directed by: James Cagney
- Written by: Ted Berkman; Raphael Blau
- Story by: Graham Greene (novel A Gun for Sale)
- Produced by: A. C. Lyles
- Starring: Robert Ivers; Georgann Johnson
- Cinematography: Haskell B. Boggs
- Edited by: Tom McAdoo
- Music by: Irvin Talbot
- Production company: Paramount Pictures
- Distributed by: Paramount Pictures
- Release date: September 1957 (US)
- Running time: 87 or 89 minutes
- Country: United States
- Language: English

Short Cut to Hell is a 1957 American film noir, filmed in black-and-white VistaVision, starring Robert Ivers and Georgann Johnson. The film is the only directorial effort by famous actor James Cagney.

Short Cut to Hell is a remake of the 1941 Alan Ladd film This Gun for Hire, which in turn was based on the 1936 Graham Greene novel A Gun for Sale.

== Plot ==
Professional hitman Kyle Niles is hired to commit two murders and afterwards double-crossed by his employer Bahrwell. Seeking revenge, Kyle kidnaps singer Glory Hamilton, the girlfriend of the police detective in charge of his pursuit. Kyle is finally able to get even with Bahrwell, and in the process reveals his long-dormant "good" side.

== Cast ==
- Robert Ivers as Kyle Niles
- Georgann Johnson as Glory Hamilton
- William Bishop as Sgt. Stan Lowery
- Jacques Aubuchon as Bahrwell
- Peter Baldwin as Carl Adams
- Yvette Vickers as Daisy
- Murvyn Vye as Nichols
- Richard Hale as AT

== See also ==
- List of American films of 1957
