= St. Francis de Sales Roman Catholic Church (Manhattan, New York) =

Coordinates: 40°47′10.85″N 73°57′4.55″W

St. Francis de Sales
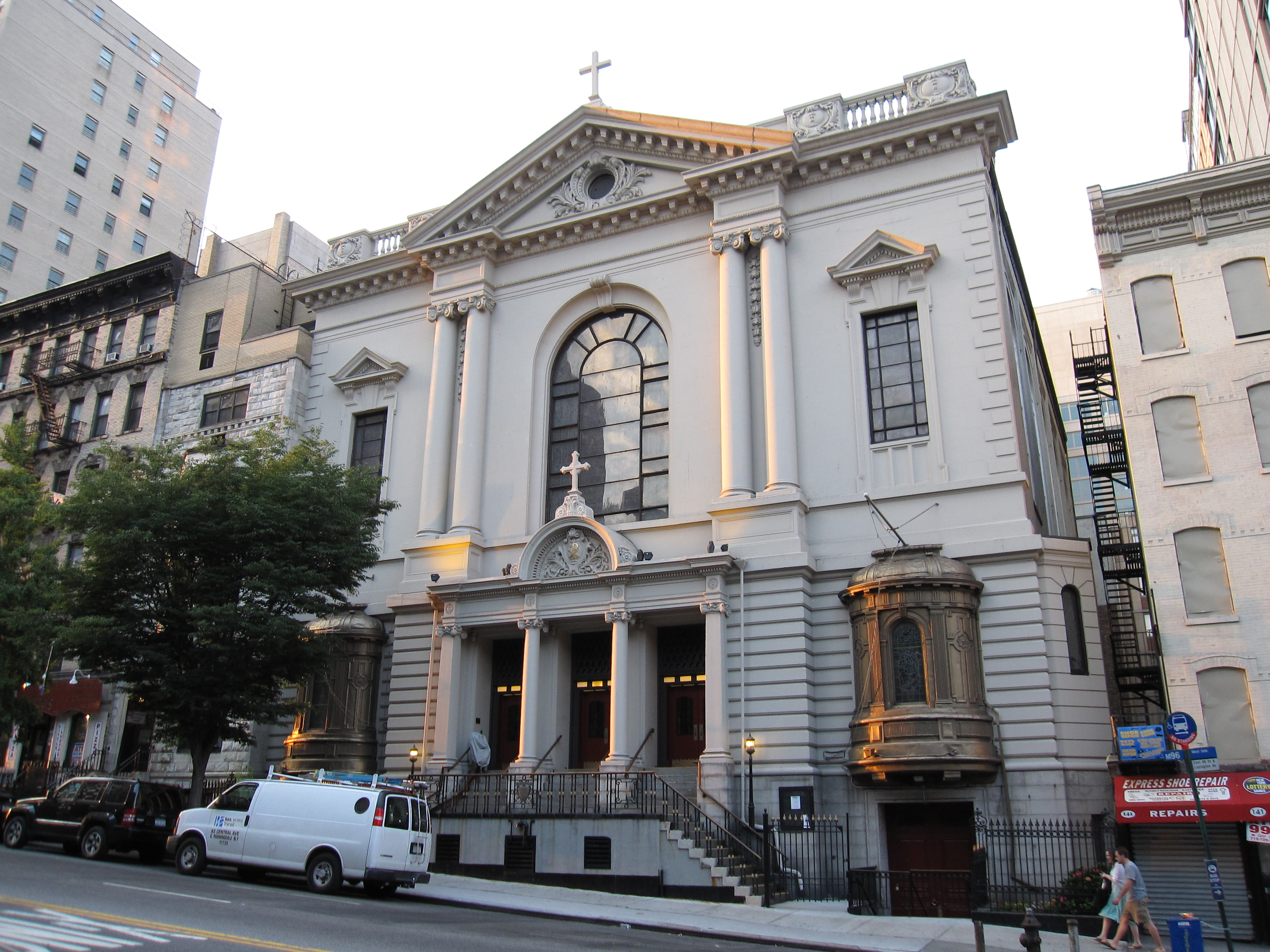
- St. Francis de Sales, 135 E 96th St, New York, NY 10128
- Interactive map of St. Francis de Sales

General information
- Location: New York City, United States of America
- Client: Roman Catholic Archdiocese of New York

Website
- St. Francis de Sales, Manhattan (UES)

St. Francis de Sales parish is a Roman Catholic church located at 135 E 96th St in Manhattan on the Upper East Side.

== History ==
In 1894 Archbishop Corrigan tasked Fr. J. L. Hoey, of St. James parish in Milton, with organizing a new parish on the Upper East Side. A temporary chapel was established in a rented house. The following December Bishop Farley laid the cornerstone for the church. It was dedicated by Farley on November 29, 1903. Upon Hoey's death in 1913, Monsignor James V. Lewis became pastor.

The parish school was organized in 1924 and staffed by the Sisters of Mercy, who had earlier established a Sunday School.

== Architecture ==
The building was designed in Italian Renaissance style by O'Connor & Metcalf, and expanded in 1903 by George H. Streeton.

The first organ for St. Francis de Sales Church was built by E. and G. G. Hook & Hastings of Boston.

== Notable parishioners ==
- James Cagney, American dancer and actor
- Sydney Magruder Washington, American dancer and blogger
