= This Gun for Hire =

1942 film by Frank Tuttle

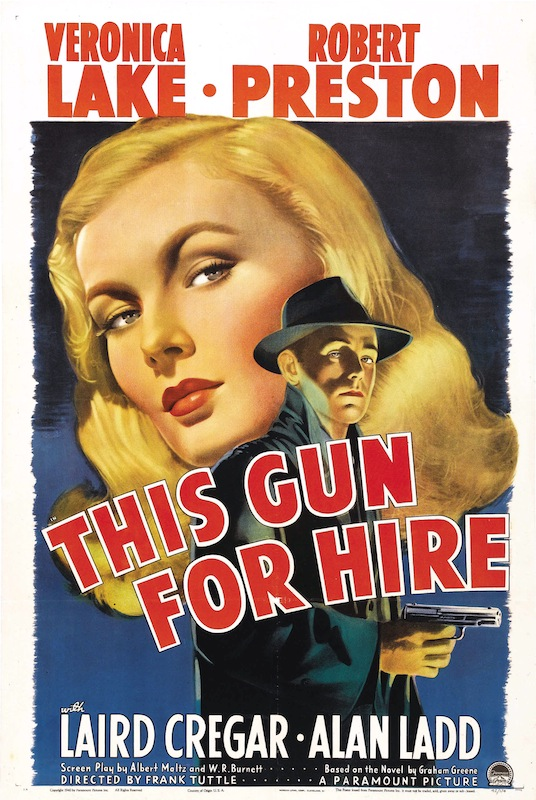
- Theatrical release poster
- Directed by: Frank Tuttle
- Screenplay by: Albert Maltz; W.R. Burnett
- Based on: A Gun for Sale by Graham Greene
- Produced by: Richard Blumenthal
- Starring: Veronica Lake; Robert Preston; Laird Cregar; Alan Ladd
- Cinematography: John Seitz
- Edited by: Archie Marshek
- Music by: David Buttolph
- Color process: Black and white
- Production company: Paramount Pictures
- Distributed by: Paramount Pictures
- Release date: April 24, 1942
- Running time: 81 minutes
- Country: United States
- Language: English
- Budget: Less than $500,000 or $512,423.16
- Box office: $1 million (US rentals)

This Gun for Hire is a 1942 American film noir crime film directed by Frank Tuttle and starring Veronica Lake, Robert Preston, Laird Cregar, and Alan Ladd. It is based on the 1936 novel A Gun for Sale by Graham Greene (published in the United States with the same title as the film).

== Plot ==
In San Francisco, chemist and blackmailer Albert Baker is killed by hitman Philip Raven, who recovers a stolen chemical formula. Raven is double-crossed by his employer, Willard Gates, who pays him with marked bills and reports them to the Los Angeles Police Department as stolen from his Los Angeles-based company, Nitro Chemical Corporation. Raven learns of the setup and seeks revenge. Police Detective Lieutenant Michael Crane, who is vacationing in San Francisco to visit his girlfriend, nightclub singer and stage magician Ellen Graham, is immediately assigned the case. He goes after Raven, but the assassin eludes him.

Gates hires Ellen to work in his Los Angeles nightclub after an audition wherein she sings and performs magic tricks. She is taken to a clandestine meeting with Senator Burnett, where she learns that Gates and Nitro Chemical are under investigation as suspected traitors, and is recruited to spy on Gates. Unknown to each other, Gates and she board a train for Los Angeles, followed by Raven. By chance, Raven and Ellen sit next to each other. The next morning, Gates is alarmed when he sees them asleep with Raven's head on her shoulder. He wires ahead to alert the police, but Raven forces Ellen at gunpoint to help him elude them again. He prepares to kill her in a condemned building, but is interrupted by workmen, allowing Ellen to flee. From Gates's club, she tries to contact Crane, but he has left San Francisco to return to Los Angeles.

That evening, the suspicious Gates invites Ellen to his Hollywood mansion, where his chauffeur Tommy knocks her unconscious to stage a fake suicide. Tipped off by Ellen's friend at the club, Crane goes to the mansion looking for Ellen, but Gates has already left. Tommy tells Crane that Ellen has been gone for two hours. While Crane questions Tommy, and makes a phone call to Ellen's hotel, Raven arrives and lurks outside, where he sees Tommy hide Ellen's purse from Crane. After Crane leaves, Raven knocks Tommy down a flight of stairs when the chauffeur denies Ellen is still there. Raven searches the house and rescues her. Tommy recovers and warns Gates at his club, where Crane has caught up with him. Raven and Ellen are confronted as they enter the club, so Raven takes her hostage as he flees. She surreptitiously drops monogrammed playing cards as a trail of "breadcrumbs". The police corner them in a railroad yard, but wait for daylight to move in.

Raven reveals to Ellen that he was orphaned at a young age and raised by an abusive aunt. One day, he snapped while she was beating him, and killed her, for which he was sent to reform school, where the abuse continued. She tells him that the formula he recovered was for a poison gas that Nitro is selling to the Japanese and begs him to extract a signed confession instead of killing Gates. Ellen helps Raven escape the dragnet, hoping she has appealed to his patriotism. However, he breaks his promise to her and kills a policeman during his escape.

Raven arrives as Nitro Chemical conducts a gas attack drill and its employees wear gas masks, obscuring their faces. Gates orders Tommy to guard his door. Tommy spots Raven and gives chase, but Raven knocks him out. Raven disguises himself in Tommy's uniform and gas mask to surprise Gates, forcing him to take him to company president Alvin Brewster, the mastermind of the treasonous Nitro sale. Raven barricades himself with them when the police and Ellen arrive, and coerces both into signing a confession. Brewster dies of a heart attack while trying to kill Raven, who then kills Gates. Crane is lowered on a scaffold and exchanges gunfire with Raven, wounding him. Raven resists killing Crane when he sees Ellen helping the detective. Other police fatally shoot Raven, but he lives long enough to be assured by Ellen that she did not turn him in and that he succeeded in obtaining the confession.

== Cast ==
- Veronica Lake as Ellen Graham
- Robert Preston as Michael Crane
- Laird Cregar as Willard Gates
- Alan Ladd as Philip Raven
- Tully Marshall as Alvin Brewster
- Marc Lawrence as Tommy
- Olin Howland as Blair Fletcher
- Roger Imhof as Senator Burnett
- Pamela Blake as Annie
- Frank Ferguson as Albert Baker
- Victor Kilian as Drew
- Patricia Farr as Ruby
- Harry Shannon as Steve Finnerty
- Charles C. Wilson as the police captain
- Mikhail Rasumny as Slukey
- Bernadene Hayes as Albert Baker's secretary
- Mary Davenport as salesgirl
- Chester Clute as rooming house manager
- Charles Arnt as male dressmaker
- Earle Dewey as Mr. Collins
- Clem Bevans as scissor grinder
- Lynda Grey as Gates's secretary
- Virita Campbell as little girl

== Production ==
=== Development ===
Graham Greene's novel was published in the U.S. as This Gun for Hire in 1936, and several movie studios considered obtaining rights to the book. These included 20th Century Fox and Paramount Pictures. (Note: Two first-edition copies of the novel – one from Twentieth Century Fox's Research Library and one from Paramount Picture's Story Department – are held in a private collection of the works of Graham Greene. Each copy bears the respective studio's file copy library stamps, and the Paramount copy includes the film's original studio project number.) Paramount bought the rights, and announced Gertrude Michael as a possible star. Later that year, the cast was announced as being Akim Tamiroff, Ray Milland, and Ida Lupino, with Dore Schary writing the script.

However, the film was not made for several more years; it was reactivated in 1941, with Frank Tuttle assigned as director. The book's plot line was kept essentially unchanged, though moved from the original European and British setting to an American one.

=== Casting ===
Veronica Lake was announced early as a female lead, with Macdonald Carey, who had been signed by Paramount following his appearance on Broadway in Lady in the Dark – mooted as a possible male lead. Tuttle had some difficulty casting the part of Raven. He later claimed that he looked at six stars, but none was suitable. One of them was Alan Baxter, and another was DeForest Kelley. Alan Ladd screen tested, and by September he had been cast and signed to a long-term Paramount contract.

Robert Preston was given the other main role, replacing Carey. Lake and Preston were given above-the-title star billing, with Ladd given an "and introducing" credit. However, during filming, Ladd clearly would be the breakout star. Shortly afterwards, The New York Times reported:

Tuttle and the studio are showing more than a passing enthusiasm for Ladd. He has been trying to get a foothold in pictures for eight years, but received no encouragement, although he tried every angle known to town – extra work, bit parts, stock contracts, dramatic schools, [and] assault of the casting offices. Sue Carol, the former silent star who is now an agent, undertook to advance the youth's career two years ago and only recently could she locate an attentive ear. Then, the breaks began.

Before This Gun for Hire was even completed, Paramount announced that their next film for Ladd would launch him as a star. It was to be a version of The Glass Key (also 1942).

The film features Yvonne De Carlo in an early role. She has one line, "Cigarette, sir?", in the Neptune Club scene. Making the film caused her to be fired from her job dancing for Earl Carroll.

== Reception ==
Although Ladd only received fourth billing, the film made him a star, due to fan reaction and critical praise.

=== Critical ===
Bosley Crowther, film critic for The New York Times, wrote a rave review:

One shudders to think of the career which Paramount must have in mind for Alan Ladd, a new actor, after witnessing the young gentleman's debut as a leading player in that studio's This Gun for Hire... Obviously, they have tagged him to be the toughest monkey loose on the screen. For not since Jimmy Cagney massaged Mae Clarke's face with a grapefruit has a grim desperado gunned his way into cinema ranks with such violence as does Mr. Ladd in this fast and exciting melodrama. Keep your eye peeled for this Ladd fellow; he's a pretty-boy killer who likes his work... Mr. Ladd is the buster; he is really an actor to watch. After this stinging performance, he has something to live up to – or live down.

The Los Angeles Times wrote, "to say the film is a success is an understatement."

Albert Maltz, who worked on the script, later said "it was a very creaky melodrama - in my opinion, pretty second rate. It doesn't stand up at all and I just don't know why it was so successful in the way it was."

John Houseman later wrote Ladd played "a professional killer with a poignant and desolate ferocity that made him unique, for a time, among the male heroes of his day."

Diabolique later wrote Ladd "gives an electric debut star performance – cold, blonde, tough, mysterious, ruthless, cat-loving, redeemable – and stole the film, but a lot of this was due to Lake, who matches him beautifully (at five foot two, she was one of the few female actors shorter than him); poor old Robert Preston is completely overshadowed."

=== Box office ===
According to Ladd's biographer, the film ended up making $12 million, but Variety puts the film's rentals for 1942 at $1 million.

== Adaptations ==
=== Radio ===
This Gun for Hire was adapted as a radio play on the July 3, 1942, broadcast of Philip Morris Playhouse with Marlene Dietrich starring, on the January 25, 1943 broadcast of Lux Radio Theater and the April 2, 1945 broadcast of The Screen Guild Theater. Alan Ladd reprised his role in both adaptations while Veronica Lake reprised in the latter, but was replaced with Joan Blondell in the former.

=== Remakes ===
Paramount Pictures later adapted the story as Short Cut to Hell (1957), directed by James Cagney, his only directorial effort.

In 1978, Tony Richardson announced he intended to remake the film, however, no movie resulted. The film was remade as a TV movie in 1991 by Lou Antonio, starring Nancy Everhard and Robert Wagner.
