= Sydney Magruder Washington =

American ballet dancer and blogger

- Born: Mitchellville, Maryland; United States
- Education: Woodward Academy; Skidmore College
- Occupation(s): Ballet dancer, blogger, actress
- Spouse: Elena Washington (m. 2017)
- Website: The Black Swan Diaries

Sydney Magdalene Magruder Washington is an American ballet dancer, actress, blogger, and mental health advocate. She was listed as one of 21 Fierce Black Feminists To Follow by HuffPost in 2017 and included in Woke 100 Women by Essence in 2018.

== Career ==
She works as a freelance ballet dancer and musical theatre actress in New York City and is signed with Resolute Artists Agency. She has danced in productions of the ballets The Nutcracker, Swan Lake, Les Sylphides, and The Firebird and in the musicals Anything Goes, Godspell, Curtains, and The Wiz.

Magruder Washington is a mental health activist and advocates for mental illness awareness, particularly for women of color, LGBTQ people, and dancers. Magrduer Washington launched a blog called The Black Swan Diaries where she writes about her experiences as a queer, black, Catholic woman in dance living with mental illness. She uses her blog as a platform to encourage breaking the stigma of mental illness. On August 3, 2017, she launched a private online community, called Warrior Swans (Ballerinas for Mental Health), for pre-professional and professional dancers struggling with mental health issues. She also uses her Instagram and YouTube accounts for advocacy.

On 7 January 2019 she served as a panelist for Open Spectrum: A Brilliant Darkness - A Conversation with Artists on Mental Health at New York Live Arts. She is a mentor for Brown Girls Do Ballet Ambassador Program, helping young dancers of color who are working towards professional careers in dance.

Magruder Washington has been featured in Teen Vogue, Pointe, Dance Magazine, O, The Oprah Magazine, BuzzFeed, and Health. She was ranked 44th in Woke 100 Women by Essence and was featured in the HuffPost list 21 Fierce Black Feminists.

== Personal life ==
Magruder Washington has Asperger syndrome, panic disorder with agoraphobia, and major depressive disorder. Prior to being correctly diagnosed with autism, she was misdiagnosed with attention deficit hyperactivity disorder aged 11.

As a teenager, Magruder Washington no longer identified with Pentecostalism and spent two years exploring Judaism and Islam. She later converted to Catholicism, taking the confirmation name Magdalene. She is a parishioner at St. Francis de Sales Roman Catholic Church on the Upper East Side of Manhattan. Magruder Washington joined Blessed is She, an online community for Catholic women in the United States, but faced discrimination in the group from members who did not approve of her sexual orientation and marriage. She was often reminded by members of the Catholic Church's teachings on homosexuality. She later described her exclusion in the group on her blog, stating that she did not fit well in the group of mostly white, middle class, heterosexual Catholic women.

She is openly lesbian and married Elena Washington in an interdenominational ceremony at Riverside Church in Morningside Heights on May 12, 2017.
