= James Cagney =

American actor and dancer (1899–1986)

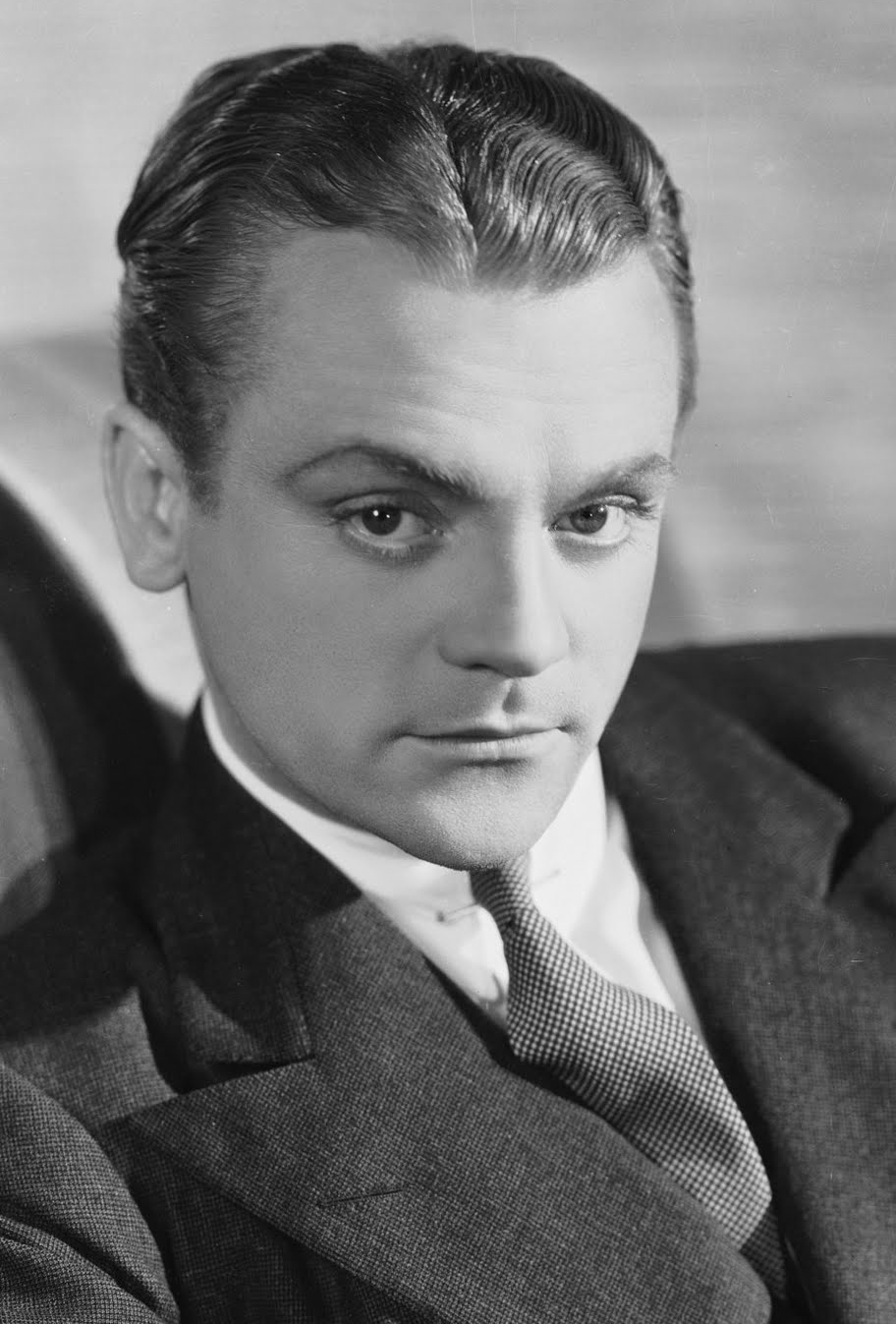
- Cagney, c. 1930
- Born: James Francis Cagney; July 17, 1899; New York City, U.S.
- Died: March 30, 1986 (aged 86); Stanford, New York, U.S.
- Resting place: Gate of Heaven Cemetery
- Occupations: Actor; dancer
- Years active: 1919–1984
- Political party: Democratic (1934–1948); Republican (1948–1986)
- Spouse: Frances Willard Vernon (m. 1922)
- Children: 2
- Relatives: William Cagney (brother); Jeanne Cagney (sister); Harry Cagney (brother); Edward Cagney (brother)

President of the Screen Actors Guild
- In office 1942–1944
- Preceded by: Edward Arnold
- Succeeded by: George Murphy

James Francis Cagney Jr. (/ˈkæɡni/; July 17, 1899 – March 30, 1986) was an American actor and dancer. On stage and in film, he was known for his consistently energetic performances, distinctive vocal style, and deadpan comic timing. He won acclaim and major awards for a wide variety of performances.

Cagney is remembered for playing multifaceted tough guys in films such as The Public Enemy (1931), Taxi! (1932), Angels with Dirty Faces (1938), The Roaring Twenties (1939), City for Conquest (1940) and White Heat (1949), finding himself typecast in the early years of his career. He was able to negotiate dancing opportunities in his films and ended up winning the Academy Award for his role of George M. Cohan in the musical Yankee Doodle Dandy (1942). In 1999, the American Film Institute ranked him eighth on its list of greatest male stars of the Golden Age of Hollywood. Orson Welles described him as "maybe the greatest actor who ever appeared in front of a camera".

After making his debut in 1919, he spent several years in vaudeville as a dancer and comedian and played his first major acting role in 1925. Al Jolson was sufficiently impressed by his performance in 1929's Penny Arcade that he bought the rights to it, securing Cagney's part in the Warner Bros. adaptation of the play. This marked the beginning of a lengthy, albeit turbulent association with the studio.

Cagney's fifth film, The Public Enemy, became one of the most influential gangster movies of the period. He became one of Hollywood's leading stars and one of Warner Bros.' biggest contracts at the time. In 1938, he received his first Academy Award nomination for Best Actor for his subtle portrayal of the tough guy/man-child Rocky Sullivan in Angels with Dirty Faces. He was nominated a third time in 1955 for Love Me or Leave Me with Doris Day. Cagney retired from acting and dancing in 1961. He came out of retirement 20 years later for a part in the movie Ragtime (1981), mainly to aid his recovery from a stroke.

Cagney walked out on Warner Bros. twice over the course of his career, each time returning on much improved personal and artistic terms. In 1935, he sued Warner for breach of contract and signed with Edward L. Alperson's independent company Grand National Pictures. In 1942, he established his own production company, Cagney Productions, before returning to Warner seven years later. In reference to Cagney's refusal to be pushed around, Jack L. Warner called him "the Professional Againster". Cagney also made numerous USO troop tours before and during World War II and served as president of the Screen Actors Guild for two years.

== Early life ==
James Francis "Jimmy" Cagney Jr. was born in 1899 on the Lower East Side of Manhattan in New York City. His biographers disagree as to the actual location: either on the corner of Avenue D and 8th Street, or in a top-floor apartment at 391 East 8th Street, the address that is on his birth certificate. His father, James Francis Cagney Sr. (1875–1918), was of Irish descent. At the time of his son's birth, he was a bartender and amateur boxer, although on Cagney's birth certificate, he is listed as a telegraphist. His mother was Carolyn Elizabeth (née Nelson; 1877–1945); her father was a Norwegian ship's captain, and her mother was Irish.

Cagney was the second of seven children, two of whom died within months of their births. He was sickly as an infant—so much so that his mother feared he would die before he could be baptized. He later attributed his poor health to the poverty his family endured. The family moved twice while he was still young, first to East 79th Street, and then to East 96th Street. He was confirmed at St. Francis de Sales Roman Catholic Church in Manhattan; his funeral service was eventually held in the same church.

The red-haired, blue-eyed Cagney graduated from Stuyvesant High School in New York City in 1918, and attended Columbia College, where he intended to major in Art. He also took German and joined the Student Army Training Corps, but he dropped out after one semester, returning home upon the death of his father during the 1918 flu pandemic.

Cagney held a variety of jobs early in his life: junior architect, copy boy for the New York Sun, book custodian at the New York Public Library, bellhop, draughtsman, and night doorkeeper. He gave all his earnings to his family. While Cagney was working for the New York Public Library, he met Florence James, who helped him into an acting career. Cagney believed in hard work, later stating, "It was good for me. I feel sorry for the kid who has too cushy a time of it. Suddenly he has to come face-to-face with the realities of life without any mama or papa to do his thinking for him."

He started tap dance as a boy (a skill that eventually contributed to his Academy Award) and was nicknamed "Cellar-Door Cagney" after his habit of dancing on slanted cellar doors. He was a good street fighter, defending his older brother Harry, a medical student, when necessary. He engaged in amateur boxing, and was a runner-up for the New York state lightweight title. His coaches encouraged him to turn professional, but his mother would not allow it. He also played semi-professional baseball for a local team, and entertained dreams of playing in the Major Leagues.

His introduction to films was unusual. When visiting an aunt who lived in Brooklyn, opposite Vitagraph Studios, Cagney would climb over the fence to watch the filming of John Bunny movies. He became involved in amateur dramatics, starting as a scenery boy for a Chinese pantomime at Lenox Hill Neighborhood House (one of the first settlement houses in the nation) where his brother Harry performed and Florence James directed. He was initially content working behind the scenes and had no interest in performing. One night, however, Harry became ill, and although Cagney was not an understudy, his photographic memory of rehearsals enabled him to stand in for his brother without making a single mistake.

== Career ==
=== 1919–1930: Early career ===
In 1919, while Cagney was working at Wanamaker's Department Store, a colleague saw him dance and informed him about a role in the upcoming production Every Sailor. It was a wartime play in which the chorus was made up of servicemen dressed as women that was originally titled Ever Sailor. Cagney auditioned for the chorus, although considering it a waste of time, as he knew only one dance step, the complicated Peabody, but he knew it perfectly. This was enough to convince the producers that he could dance, and he copied the other dancers' moves and added them to his repertoire while waiting to go on. He did not find it odd to play a woman, nor was he embarrassed. He later recalled how he was able to shed his own naturally shy persona when he stepped onto the stage: "For there I am not myself. I am not that fellow, Jim Cagney, at all. I certainly lost all consciousness of him when I put on skirts, wig, paint, powder, feathers and spangles."

Had Cagney's mother had her way, his stage career would have ended when he quit Every Sailor after two months; proud as she was of his performance, she preferred that he get an education. Cagney appreciated the $35 a week he was paid, which he later remembered as "a mountain of money for me in those worrisome days." In deference to his mother's concerns, he got a job as a brokerage house runner. This did not stop him from looking for more stage work, however, and he went on to audition successfully for a chorus part in the William B. Friedlander musical Pitter Patter, for which he earned $55 a week. (He sent $40 to his mother each week.) So strong was his habit of holding down more than one job at a time, that he also worked as a dresser for one of the leads, portered the casts' luggage, and understudied for the lead. Among the chorus line performers was 20-year-old Frances Willard "Billie" Vernon; they married in 1922.

The show began Cagney's 10-year association with vaudeville and Broadway. The Cagneys were among the early residents of Free Acres, a social experiment established by Bolton Hall in Berkeley Heights, New Jersey.

Pitter Patter was not hugely successful, but it did well enough to run for 32 weeks, making it possible for Cagney to join the vaudeville circuit. He and Vernon toured separately with a number of different troupes, reuniting as "Vernon and Nye" to do simple comedy routines and musical numbers. "Nye" was a rearrangement of the last syllable of Cagney's surname. One of the troupes Cagney joined was Parker, Rand, and Leach, taking over the spot vacated when Archie Leach—who later changed his name to Cary Grant—left.

In 1924, after years of touring and struggling to make money, Cagney and Vernon moved to Hawthorne, California, partly for Cagney to meet his new mother-in-law, who had just moved there from Chicago, and partly to investigate breaking into the movies. Their train fares were paid for by a friend, the press officer of Pitter Patter, who was also desperate to act. They were not successful at first; the dance studio Cagney set up had few clients and folded; Vernon and he toured the studios, but there was no interest. Eventually, they borrowed some money and headed back to New York via Chicago and Milwaukee, enduring failure along the way when they attempted to make money on the stage.

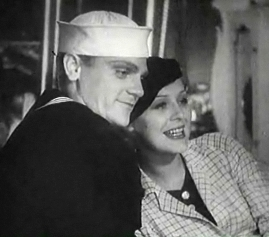
Cagney and Gloria Stuart (later of 1997's Titanic) in 1934's Here Comes the Navy. Cagney played sailors or naval officers several times.

Cagney secured his first significant nondancing role in 1925. He played a young tough guy in the three-act play Outside Looking In by Maxwell Anderson, earning $200 a week. As with Pitter Patter, Cagney went to the audition with little confidence he would get the part. At this point, he had had no experience with drama. Cagney felt that he got the role only because his hair was redder than that of Alan Bunce, the only other red-headed performer in New York. Both the play and Cagney received good reviews; Life magazine wrote, "Mr. Cagney, in a less spectacular role [than his co-star] makes a few minutes silence during his mock-trial scene something that many a more established actor might watch with profit." Burns Mantle wrote that it "...contained the most honest acting now to be seen in New York."

Following the four-month run of Outside Looking In, the Cagneys were financially secure enough for Cagney to return to vaudeville over the next few years, achieving various success. During this period, he met George M. Cohan, whom he later portrayed in Yankee Doodle Dandy, though they never spoke.

Cagney secured the lead role in the 1926–27 season West End production of Broadway by George Abbott. The show's management insisted that he copy Broadway lead Lee Tracy's performance, despite Cagney's discomfort in doing so, but the day before the show sailed for England, they decided to replace him. This was a devastating turn of events for Cagney apart from the logistical difficulties this presented – the couple's luggage was in the hold of the ship and they had given up their apartment. He almost quit show business. As Vernon recalled, "Jimmy said that it was all over. He made up his mind that he would get a job doing something else."

The Cagneys had run-of-the-play contracts, which lasted as long as the play did. Vernon was in the chorus line of the show, and with help from the Actors' Equity Association, Cagney understudied Tracy on the Broadway show, providing them with a desperately needed steady income. Cagney also established a dance school for professionals, and then landed a part in the play Women Go On Forever, directed by John Cromwell, which ran for four months. By the end of the run, Cagney was exhausted from acting and running the dance school.

Cagney had built a reputation as an innovative teacher; when he was cast as the lead in Grand Street Follies of 1928, he was also appointed choreographer. The show received rave reviews and was followed by Grand Street Follies of 1929. These roles led to a part in George Kelly's Maggie the Magnificent, a play the critics disliked, though they liked Cagney's performance. Cagney saw this role (and Women Go on Forever) as significant because of the talented directors he met. He learned "...what a director was for and what a director could do. They were directors who could play all the parts in the play better than the actors cast for them."

=== 1930–1935: Warner Bros. ===
==== Sinners' Holiday (1930) and The Doorway to Hell (1930) ====
Playing opposite Cagney in Maggie the Magnificent was Joan Blondell, who starred again with him a few months later in Marie Baumer's new play, Penny Arcade. While the critics panned Penny Arcade, they praised Cagney and Blondell. Al Jolson, sensing film potential, bought the rights for $20,000. He then sold the play to Warner Bros., with the stipulation that they cast Cagney and Blondell in the film version. Retitled Sinners' Holiday, the film was released in 1930, starring Grant Withers and Evalyn Knapp. Joan Blondell recalled that when they were casting the film, studio head Jack Warner believed that she and Cagney had no future, and that Withers and Knapp were destined for stardom. Cagney was given a $500-a-week, three-week contract with Warner Bros.

In the film, he portrayed Harry Delano, a tough guy who becomes a killer but generates sympathy because of his unfortunate upbringing. This role of the sympathetic "bad" guy was to become a recurring character type for Cagney throughout his career. During filming of Sinners' Holiday, he also demonstrated the stubbornness that characterized his attitude toward the work. He later recalled an argument he had with director John Adolfi about a line: "There was a line in the show where I was supposed to be crying on my mother's breast... [The line] was 'I'm your baby, ain't I?' I refused to say it. Adolfi said 'I'm going to tell Zanuck.' I said 'I don't give a shit what you tell him, I'm not going to say that line.'" They took the line out.

Despite this outburst, the studio liked him, and before his three-week contract was up—while the film was still shooting—they gave Cagney a three-week extension, which was followed by a full seven-year contract at $400 a week. However, the contract allowed Warners to drop him at the end of any 40-week period, effectively guaranteeing him only 40 weeks' income at a time. As he did when he was growing up, Cagney shared his income with his family. Cagney received good reviews, and immediately played another colorful gangster supporting role in The Doorway to Hell (1930) starring Lew Ayres. The film was a financial hit, and helped to cement Cagney's growing reputation. He made four more movies before his breakthrough role.

==== The Public Enemy (1931) ====
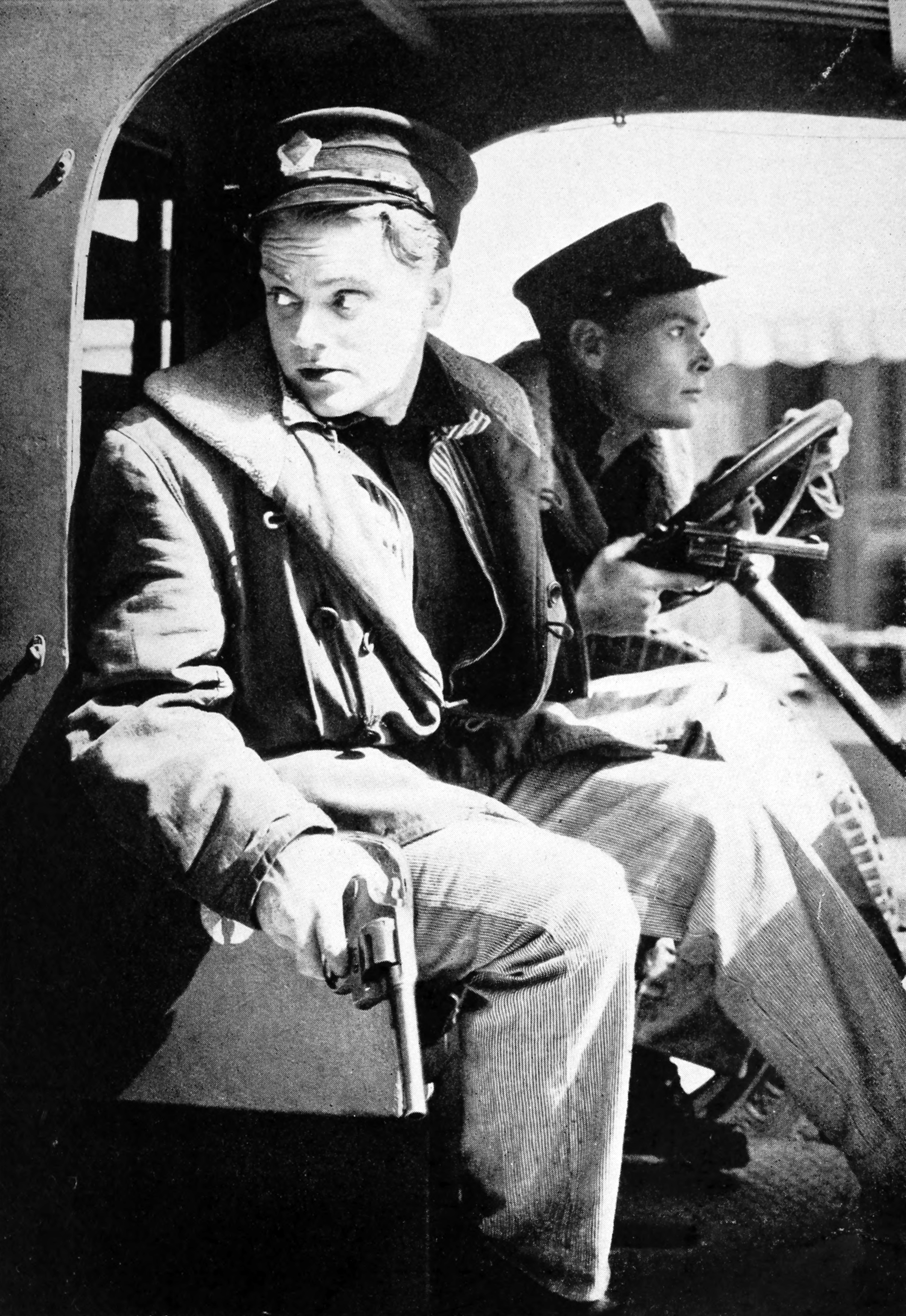
Cagney and Edward Woods in The Public Enemy (1931)

Warner Brothers' succession of gangster movie hits, in particular Little Caesar with Edward G. Robinson, culminated in the 1931 film The Public Enemy. Due to the strong reviews he had received in his short film career, Cagney was cast as nice-guy Matt Doyle, opposite Edward Woods as Tom Powers. However, after the initial rushes, the actors switched roles. Years later, Joan Blondell recalled that a few days into the filming, director William Wellman turned to Cagney and said "Now you're the lead, kid!" "Jimmy's charisma was so outstanding", she added. The film cost only $151,000 to make, but it became one of the first low-budget films to gross $1 million.

Cagney received widespread praise for his performance. The New York Herald Tribune described his interpretation as "...the most ruthless, unsentimental appraisal of the meanness of a petty killer the cinema has yet devised." He received top billing after the film, but while he acknowledged the importance of the role to his career, he always disputed the suggestion that it changed the way heroes and leading men were portrayed. He cited Clark Gable's slapping of Barbara Stanwyck six months earlier (in Night Nurse) as more important. Night Nurse was actually released three months after The Public Enemy. Gable's character punched Stanwyck's, knocking the nurse unconscious.

Cagney mashes a grapefruit into Mae Clarke's face in a famous scene from Cagney's breakthrough movie, The Public Enemy (1931)

Many critics view the scene in which Cagney pushes half a grapefruit into Mae Clarke's face as one of the most famous moments in movie history. The scene itself was a late addition, and the origin of the idea is a matter of debate: producer Darryl Zanuck claimed he thought of it in a script conference, Wellman said the idea came to him when he saw the grapefruit on the table during the shoot, and writers Glasmon and Bright claimed it was based on the real life of gangster Hymie Weiss, who threw an omelet into his girlfriend's face. Joan Blondell recalled that the change was made when Cagney decided the omelet wouldn't work. Cagney himself usually cited the writers' version, but the fruit's victim, Clarke, agreed that it was Wellman's idea, saying, "I'm sorry I ever agreed to do the grapefruit bit. I never dreamed it would be shown in the movie. Director Bill Wellman thought of the idea suddenly. It wasn't even written into the script." However, according to Turner Classic Movies (TCM), the grapefruit scene was a practical joke that Cagney and costar Mae Clarke decided to play on the crew while the cameras were rolling. Wellman liked it so much that he left it in. TCM also notes that the scene made Clarke's ex-husband, Lew Brice, very happy. "He saw the film repeatedly just to see that scene, and was often shushed by angry patrons when his delighted laughter got too loud."

Cagney's stubbornness became well known behind the scenes, especially after he refused to join in a 100% participation-free charity drive pushed by Douglas Fairbanks Jr. Cagney did not object to donating money to charity, but he did object to being forced to give. Already he had acquired the nickname "The Professional Againster".

==== Smart Money (1931), Blonde Crazy (1931), and Taxi! (1932) ====
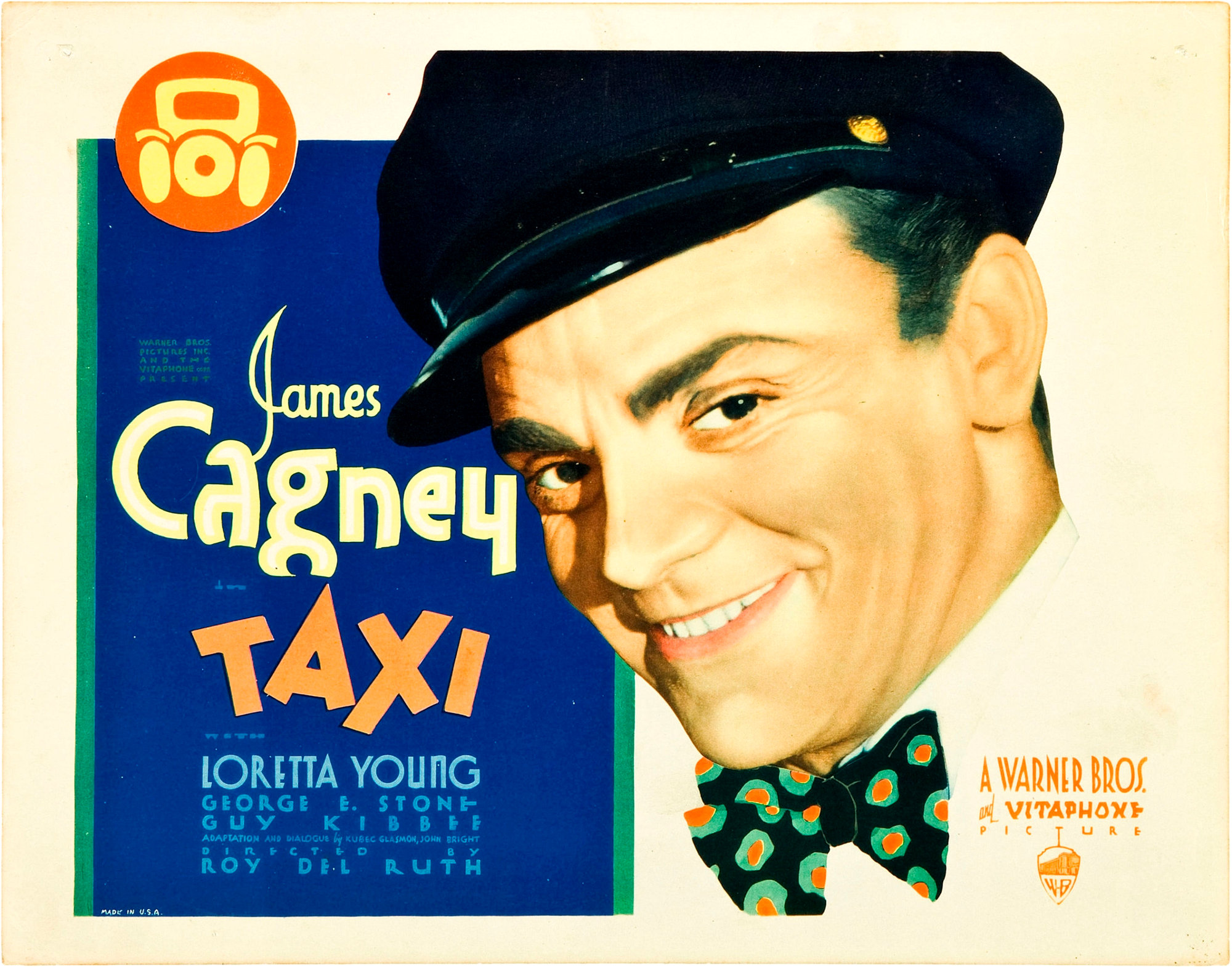
Lobby card for Taxi! (1932)

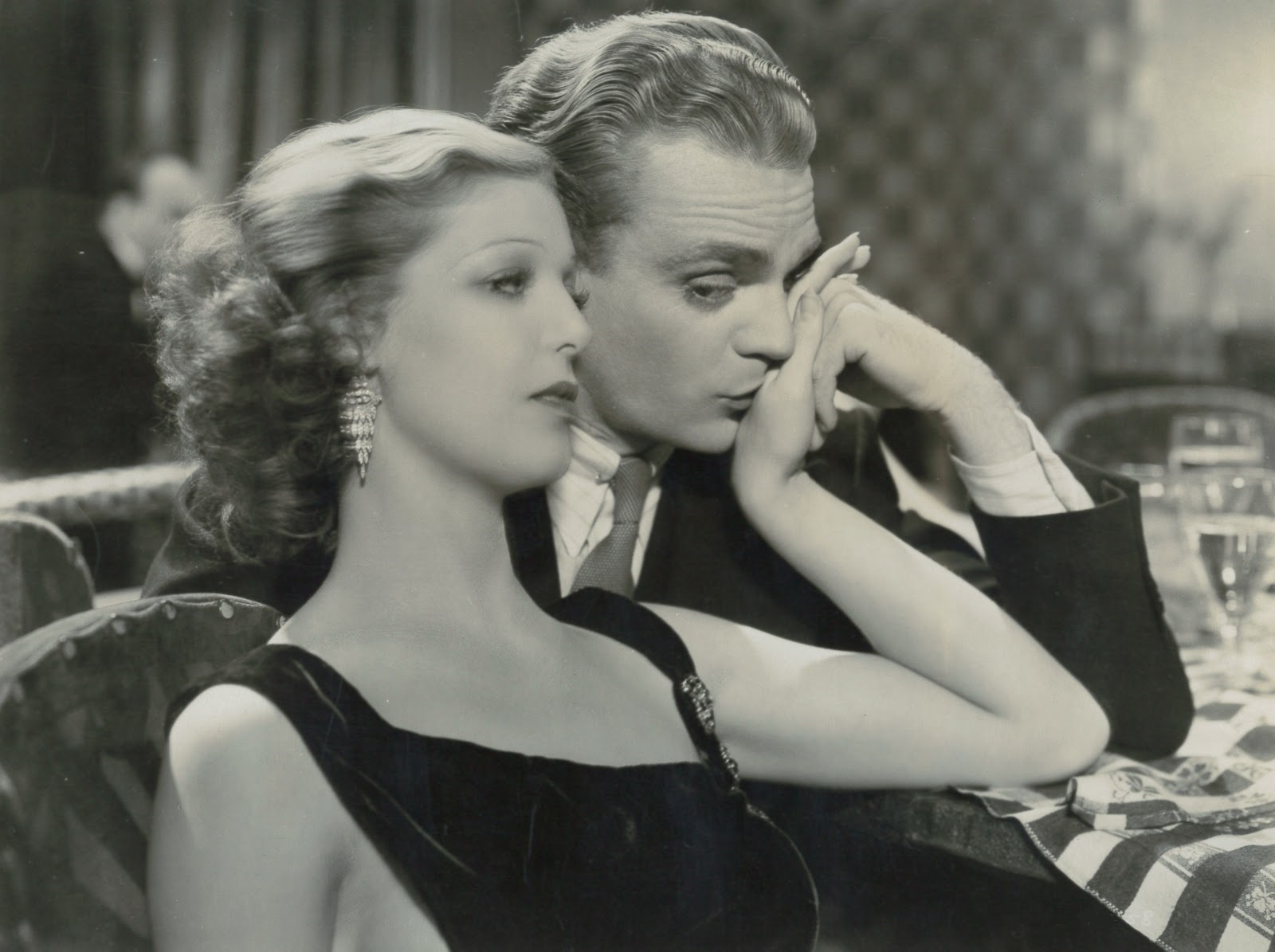
Loretta Young and Cagney in Taxi! (1932)

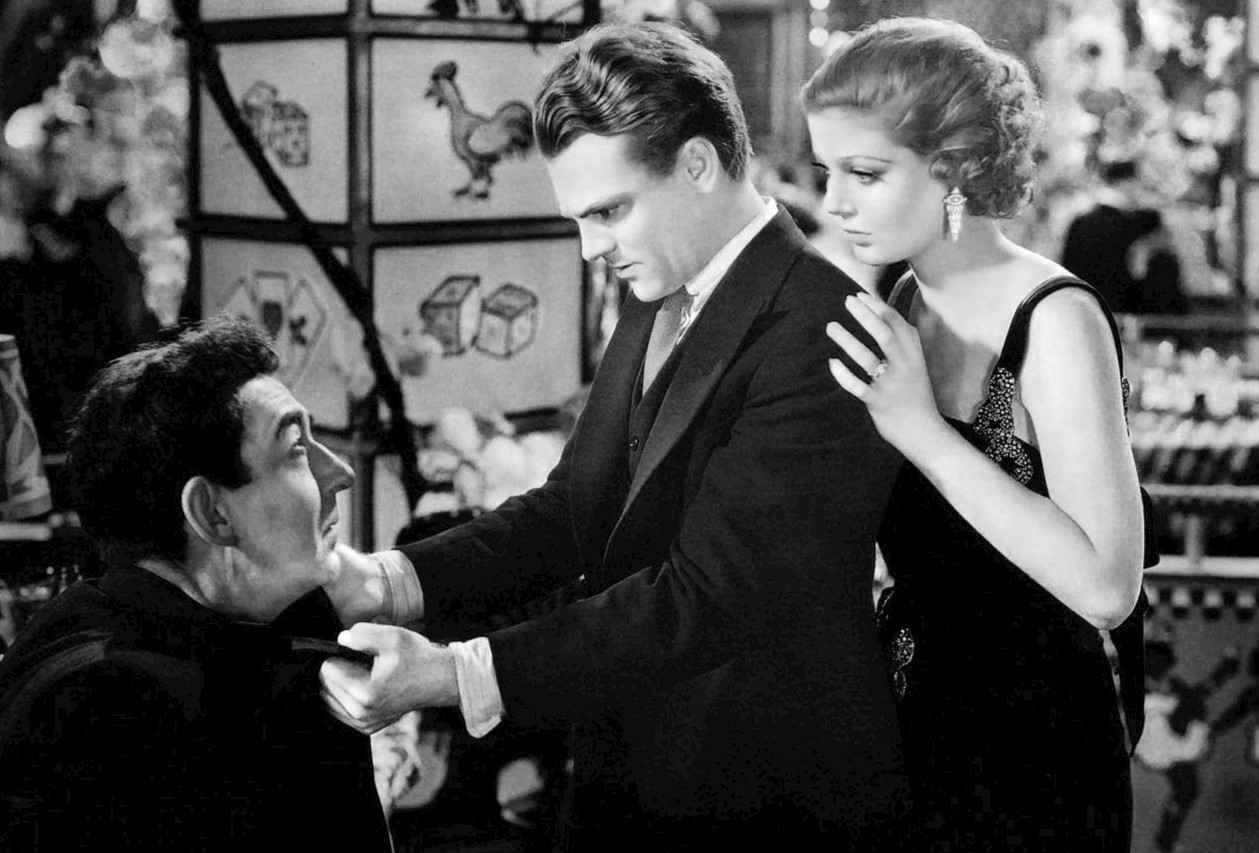
David Landau, Loretta Young and Cagney in Taxi! (1932)

Warner Bros. was quick to team its two rising gangster stars, Edward G. Robinson and Cagney, for the 1931 film Smart Money. Eager to follow the success of Robinson's Little Caesar, the studio filmed Smart Money concurrently with The Public Enemy.

With the introduction of the Motion Picture Production Code of 1930 that placed limits upon on-screen violence, Warner Bros. allowed Cagney a change of pace, casting him in the comedy Blonde Crazy, again opposite Blondell.

The Public Enemy was an enormous box-office success, and Cagney began to compare his pay with that of his peers, believing that his contract allowed for salary adjustments based on the success of his films. However, Warner Bros. refused to allow him a pay raise. The studio heads also insisted that Cagney continue promoting their films, even those in which he did not appear, despite his opposition. Cagney returned to New York, leaving his brother Bill to look after his apartment.

While Cagney was in New York, his brother, who had effectively become his agent, sought a substantial pay raise and more personal freedom for him. Following the success of The Public Enemy and Blonde Crazy, Warner Bros. offered Cagney a contract for $1,000 per week. Cagney's first film upon returning from New York was Taxi! (1932), a critical success in which Cagney danced for the first time on screen. It also marked the last time that he permitted live ammunition to be shot at him, a relatively common occurrence at the time, as blank cartridges and squibs were rare and expensive. During filming for Taxi!, he was almost hit by gunfire. In the film's opening scene, Cagney speaks fluent Yiddish, a language that he had learned during childhood in New York City.

"I never said, 'Mmm, you dirty rat!' What I actually did say was 'Judy, Judy, Judy.'"

— Cagney, in his acceptance speech for the AFI Life Achievement Award, 1974

Blonde Crazy and Taxi! contain lines that became the basis of many misquoted celebrity impersonations of Cagney. He never said "Mmm, you dirty rat!" on film; in Blonde Crazy, he says: "That dirty, double-crossin' rat!" and in Taxi!, he says: "Come out and take it, you dirty, yellow-bellied rat, or I'll give it to you through the door!" The quote from Blonde Crazy was nominated for the American Film Institute's 2005 AFI's 100 Years...100 Movie Quotes list.

The film was swiftly followed by The Crowd Roars and Winner Take All.

==== Fighting with Warner Bros. ====
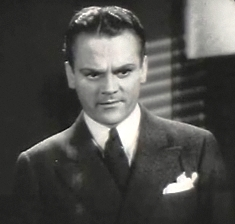
Along with George Raft, Edward G. Robinson, and Humphrey Bogart, all of whom were Warner Bros. actors, Cagney defined what a movie gangster was. In G Men (1935), however, he played a lawyer who joins the FBI.

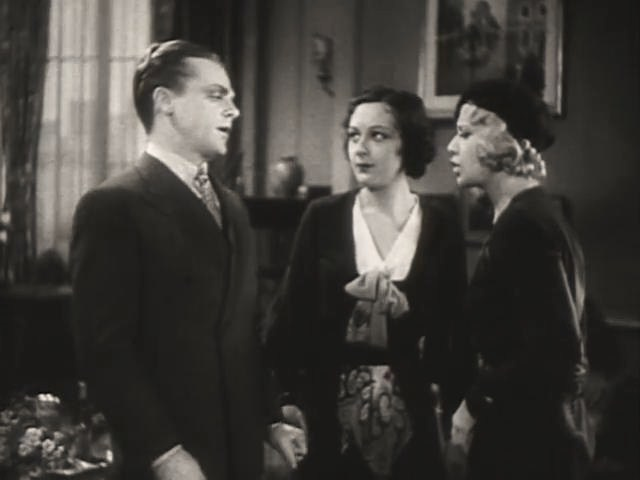
Cagney, Ann Dvorak and Joan Blondell in The Crowd Roars (1932)

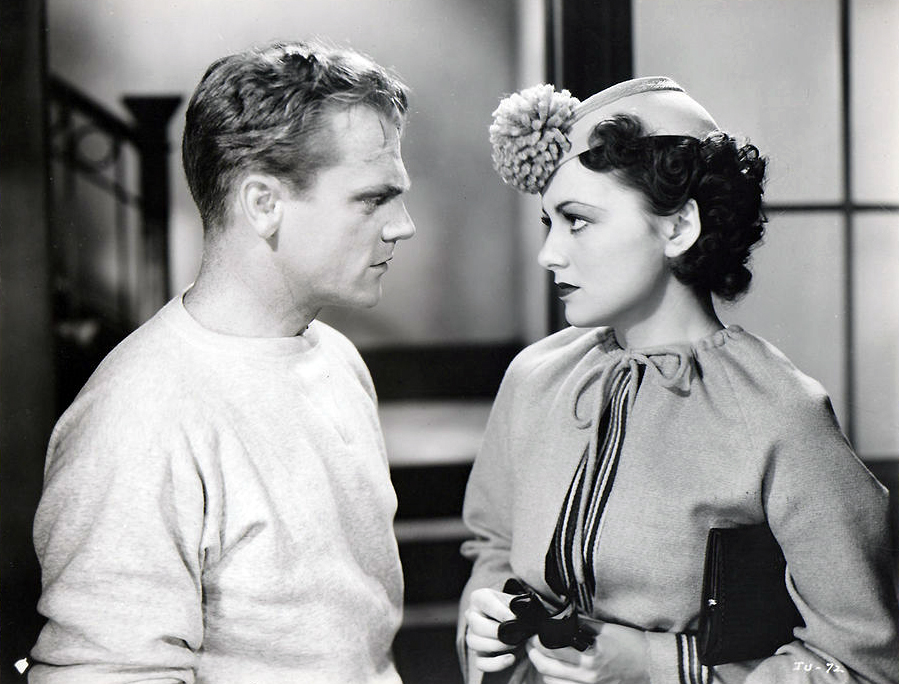
Cagney and Olivia de Havilland in The Irish in Us (1935)

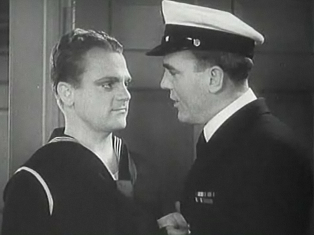
With close friend Pat O'Brien in Here Comes the Navy (1934), their first of nine films together

Despite his success, Cagney remained dissatisfied with his contract. He wanted more money for his successful films, but he also offered to take a smaller salary should his star wane. Warner Bros. refused, so Cagney once again walked out. He held out for $4000 a week, the same salary as Edward G. Robinson, Douglas Fairbanks Jr., and Kay Francis. Warner Bros. refused to cave in this time, and suspended him. Cagney announced that he would do his next three pictures for free if they canceled the five years remaining on his contract. He also threatened to quit Hollywood and go back to Columbia University to follow his brothers into medicine. After six months of suspension, Frank Capra brokered a deal that increased Cagney's salary to around $3000 a week, and guaranteed top billing and no more than four films a year.

Having learned about the block-booking studio system that virtually guaranteed the studios huge profits, Cagney was determined to spread the wealth. He regularly sent money and goods to old friends from his neighborhood, though he did not generally make this known. His insistence on no more than four films a year was based on his having witnessed actors—even teenagers—regularly being worked 100 hours a week to turn out more films. This experience was an integral reason for his involvement in forming the Screen Actors Guild in 1933.

Cagney returned to the studio and made Hard to Handle (1933). This was followed by a steady stream of crowd-pleasing films, including the highly regarded Footlight Parade, which gave Cagney the chance to return to his song-and-dance roots. The film includes show-stopping scenes with Busby Berkeley-choreographed routines. In 1934, Here Comes the Navy paired him with Pat O'Brien for the first of nine films together. The two would have an enduring friendship. Also in 1934, Cagney made his first of two raucous comedies with Bette Davis, Jimmy the Gent, for which he had himself heavily made up with thick eyebrows and procured an odd haircut for the period without the studio's permission, shaved on the back and sides. Cagney initially had the make-up department put prominent scars on the back of his head for a close-up but the studio demanded that he remove them. Cagney's and Davis's fast-paced scenes together were particularly energetic.

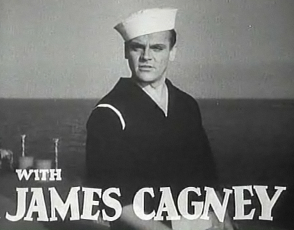
Here Comes the Navy (1934)

In 1935 Cagney was listed as one of the Top Ten Moneymakers in Hollywood for the first time, and was cast more frequently in non-gangster roles; he played a lawyer who joins the FBI in G-Men, and he also took on his first, and only, Shakespearean role, as top-billed Nick Bottom in A Midsummer Night's Dream alongside Joe E. Brown as Francis Flute and Mickey Rooney as Puck.

Cagney's last movie in 1935 was Ceiling Zero, his third film with Pat O'Brien. O'Brien received top billing, which was a clear breach of Cagney's contract. This, combined with the fact that Cagney had made five movies in 1934, again against his contract terms, caused him to bring legal proceedings against Warner Bros. for breach of contract. The dispute dragged on for several months. Cagney received calls from David Selznick and Sam Goldwyn, but neither felt in a position to offer him work while the dispute went on. Meanwhile, while being represented by his brother William in court, Cagney went back to New York to search for a country property where he could indulge his passion for farming.

=== 1936–1937: Independent years ===
Cagney spent most of the next year on his farm, and went back to work only when Edward L. Alperson of Grand National Pictures, a newly established, independent studio, approached him to make movies for $100,000 a film and 10% of the profits. Cagney made two features for Grand National: the crime drama Great Guy (1936) with Cagney as a federal inspector, and the musical Something to Sing About (1937) with Cagney as a bandleader and dancer. He received good reviews for both.

Cagney might have continued with Grand National but the studio, having spent lavishly on the Cagney films, couldn't recoup the production costs. Grand National usually made low-budget features for small, neighborhood theaters, and the Cagney films proved too expensive for the intended market. Grand National had acquired a promising story property from author Rowland Brown, Angels with Dirty Faces, for $30,000. Cagney was slated to star in the film version but, with the studio in financial trouble, the project went no further. Cagney took the script to Warner Bros., which bought it from Grand National and filmed it in 1938.

Cagney also became involved in political causes, and in 1936, agreed to sponsor the Hollywood Anti-Nazi League. Unknown to Cagney, the League was in fact a front organization for the Communist International (Comintern), which sought to enlist support for the Soviet Union and its foreign policies.

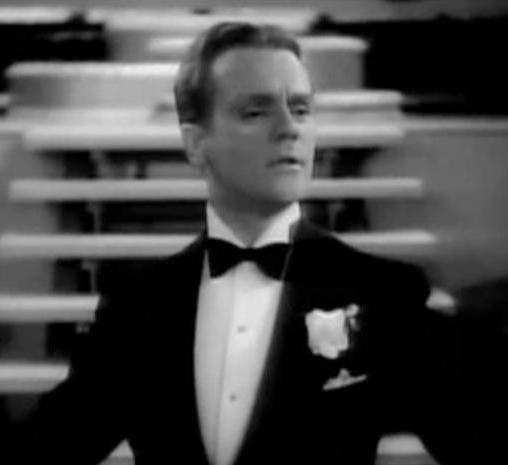
Cagney in Something to Sing About (1937)

The courts eventually decided the Warner Bros. lawsuit in Cagney's favor. He had done what many thought unthinkable: taking on the studios and winning. Not only did he win, but Warner Bros. also knew that he was still their foremost box office draw and invited him back for a five-year, $150,000-a-film deal, with no more than two pictures a year. Cagney also had full say over what films he did and did not make. Additionally, William Cagney was guaranteed the position of assistant producer for the movies in which his brother starred.

Cagney had demonstrated the power of the walkout in holding the studios to their word. He later explained his reasons, saying, "I walked out because I depended on the studio heads to keep their word on this, that, or other promise, and when the promise was not kept, my only recourse was to deprive them of my services." Cagney himself acknowledged the importance of the walkout for other actors in breaking the dominance of the studio system. Normally, when a star walked out, the time he or she was absent was added onto the end of an already long contract, as happened with Olivia de Havilland and Bette Davis. Cagney, however, walked out and came back to a better contract. Many in Hollywood watched the case closely for hints of how future contracts might be handled.

=== 1938–1942: Return to Warner Bros. ===
==== Angels with Dirty Faces (1938) ====
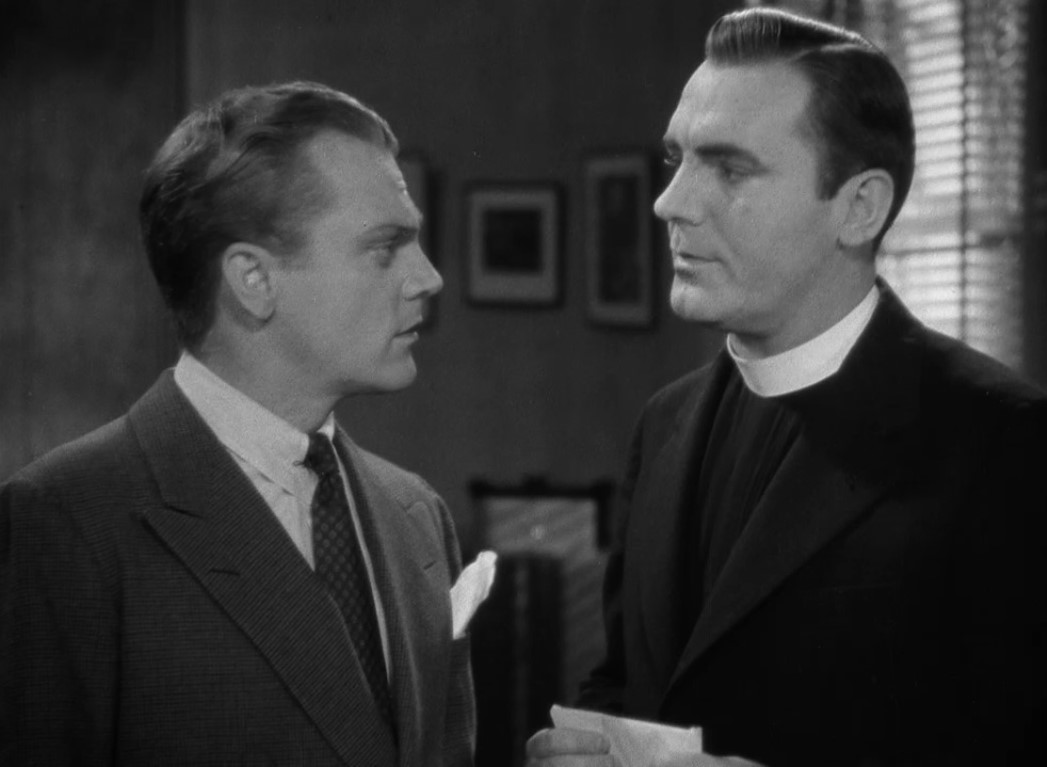
Cagney and Pat O'Brien in Angels with Dirty Faces (1938), the sixth of nine feature films they would make together

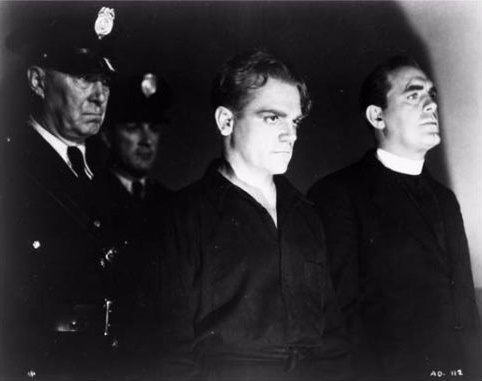
Cagney and Pat O'Brien in the endlessly debated final walk

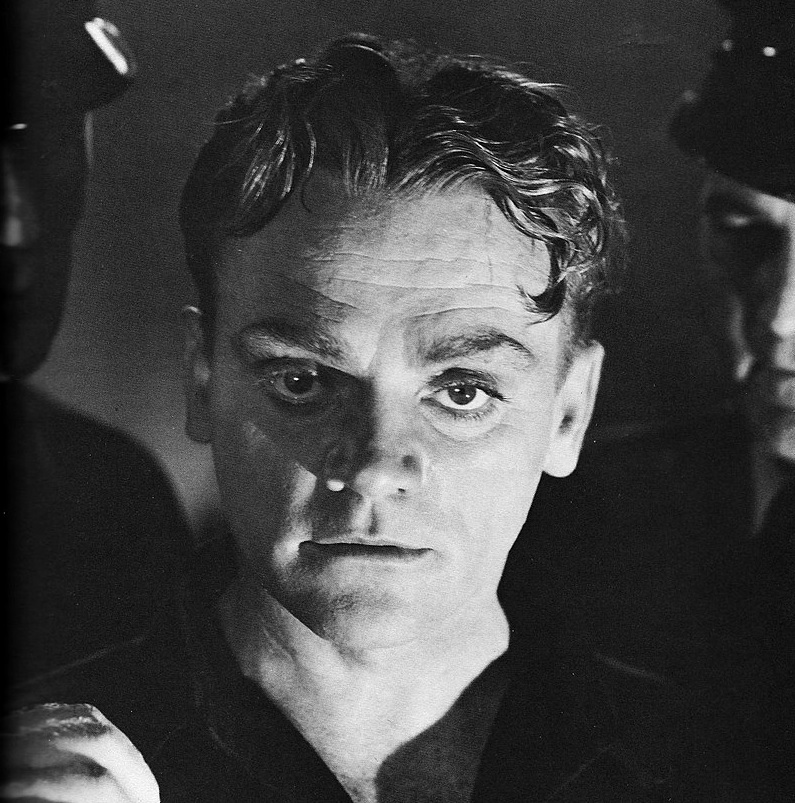
Cagney takes the controversial final walk

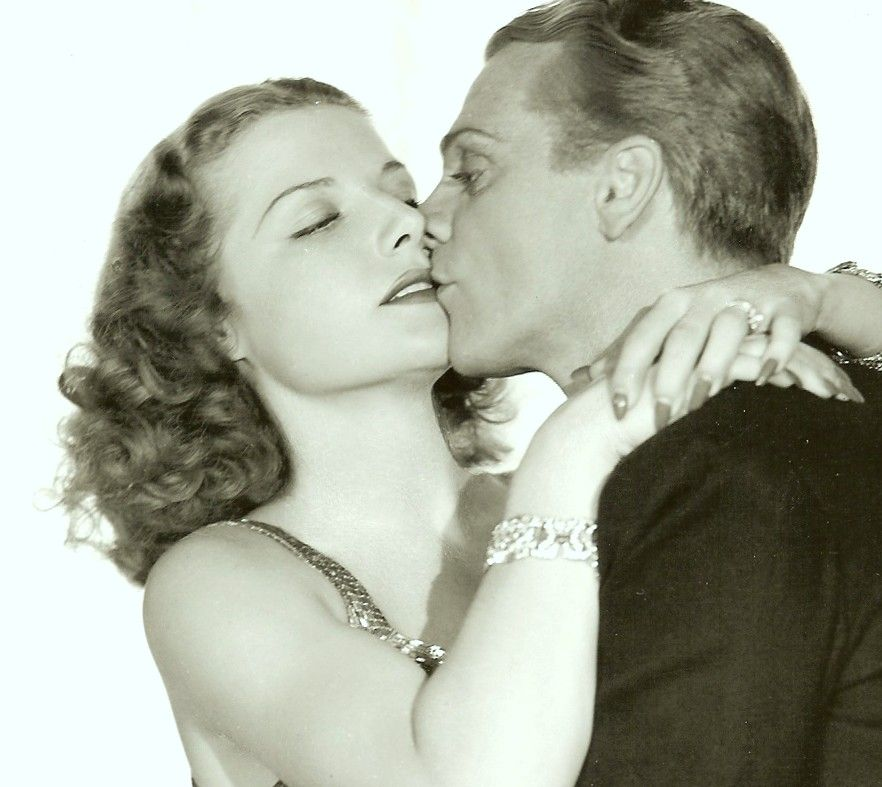
Ann Sheridan and Cagney in Angels with Dirty Faces (1938)

Cagney's two films of 1938, Boy Meets Girl and Angels with Dirty Faces, both costarred Pat O'Brien. The former was a fast-paced farce with a Hollywood theme, with Cagney and O'Brien playing for laughs, and received mixed reviews. Warner Bros. had allowed Cagney his change of pace, but was anxious to get him back to playing tough guys, which was more lucrative.

Cagney starred as Rocky Sullivan, a gangster fresh out of jail and looking for his former associate, played by Humphrey Bogart, who owes him money. While revisiting his old haunts, he runs into his old friend Jerry Connolly, played by O'Brien, who is now a priest concerned about the Dead End Kids' futures, particularly as they idolize Rocky. After a messy shootout, Sullivan is eventually captured by the police and sentenced to death in the electric chair. Connolly pleads with Rocky to "turn yellow" on his way to the chair so the Kids will lose their admiration for him, and hopefully avoid turning to crime. Sullivan refuses, but on his way to his execution, he breaks down and begs for his life. It is unclear whether this cowardice is real or just feigned for the Kids' benefit. Cagney himself refused to say, insisting he liked the ambiguity. The film is regarded by many as one of Cagney's finest, and garnered him an Academy Award for Best Actor nomination for 1938. He lost to Spencer Tracy in Boys Town. Cagney had been considered for the role, but lost out on it due to his typecasting. (He also lost the role of Notre Dame football coach Knute Rockne in Knute Rockne, All American to his friend Pat O'Brien for the same reason.) Cagney did, however, win that year's New York Film Critics Circle Award for Best Actor.

His earlier insistence on not filming with live ammunition proved to be a good decision. Having been told while filming Angels with Dirty Faces that he would be doing a scene with real machine gun bullets (a common practice in the Hollywood of the time), Cagney refused and insisted the shots be added afterwards. As it turned out, a ricocheting bullet passed through exactly where his head would have been.

==== The Roaring Twenties (1939) ====
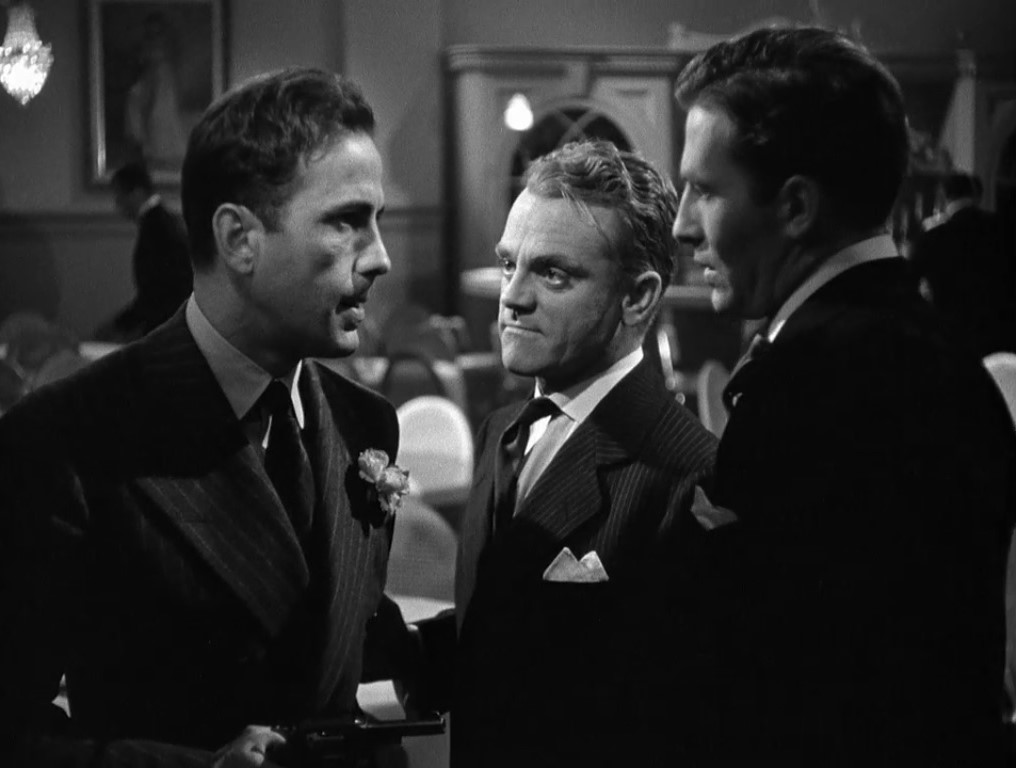
Humphrey Bogart with Cagney and Jeffrey Lynn in The Roaring Twenties (1939)

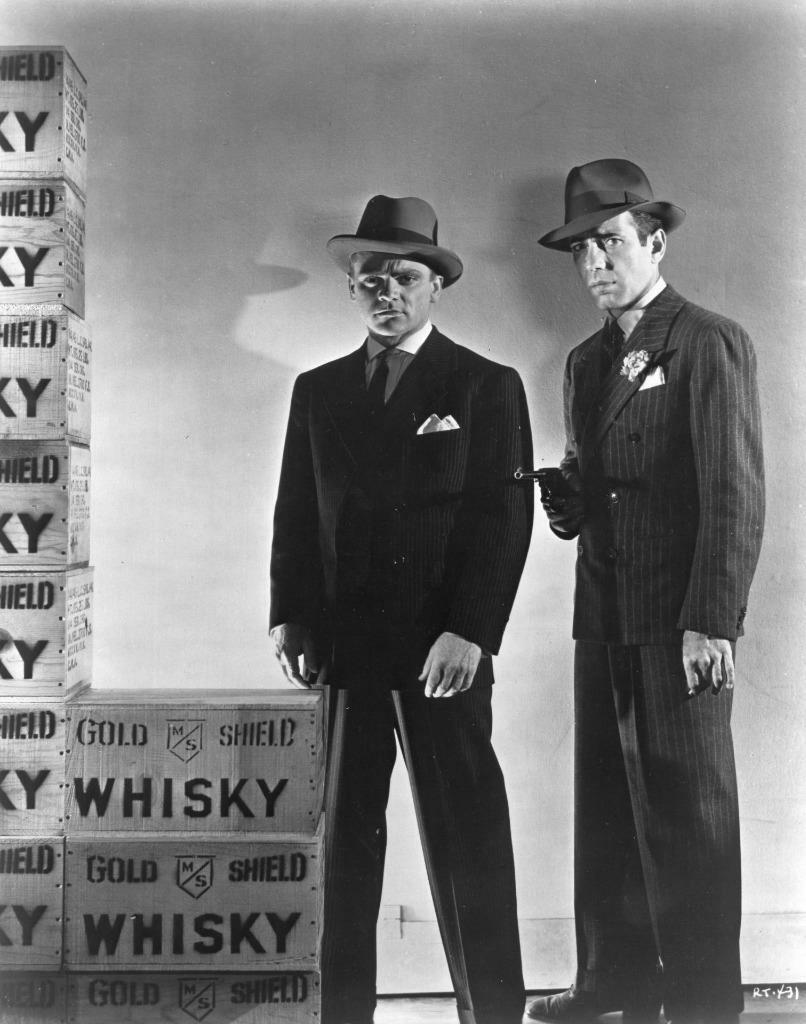
Cagney and Bogart in The Roaring Twenties (1939)

During his first year back at Warner Bros., Cagney became the studio's highest earner, making $324,000. He starred with George Raft in the smash hit Each Dawn I Die, an extremely entertaining prison movie that was so successful at the box office that it prompted the studio to offer Raft an important contract in the wake of his departure from Paramount. In addition, Cagney made The Oklahoma Kid, a memorable Western with Humphrey Bogart as the black-clad villain. Cagney completed his first decade of movie-making in 1939 with The Roaring Twenties, his first film with Raoul Walsh and his last with Bogart. After The Roaring Twenties, it would be a decade before Cagney made another gangster film. Cagney again received good reviews; Graham Greene stated, "Mr. Cagney, of the bull-calf brow, is as always a superb and witty actor". The Roaring Twenties was the last film in which Cagney's character's violence was explained by poor upbringing, or his environment, as was the case in The Public Enemy. From that point on, violence was attached to mania, as in White Heat. In 1939 Cagney was second to only Gary Cooper in the national acting wage stakes, earning $368,333.

==== 1940–1941: City for Conquest, The Fighting 69th, and The Strawberry Blonde ====
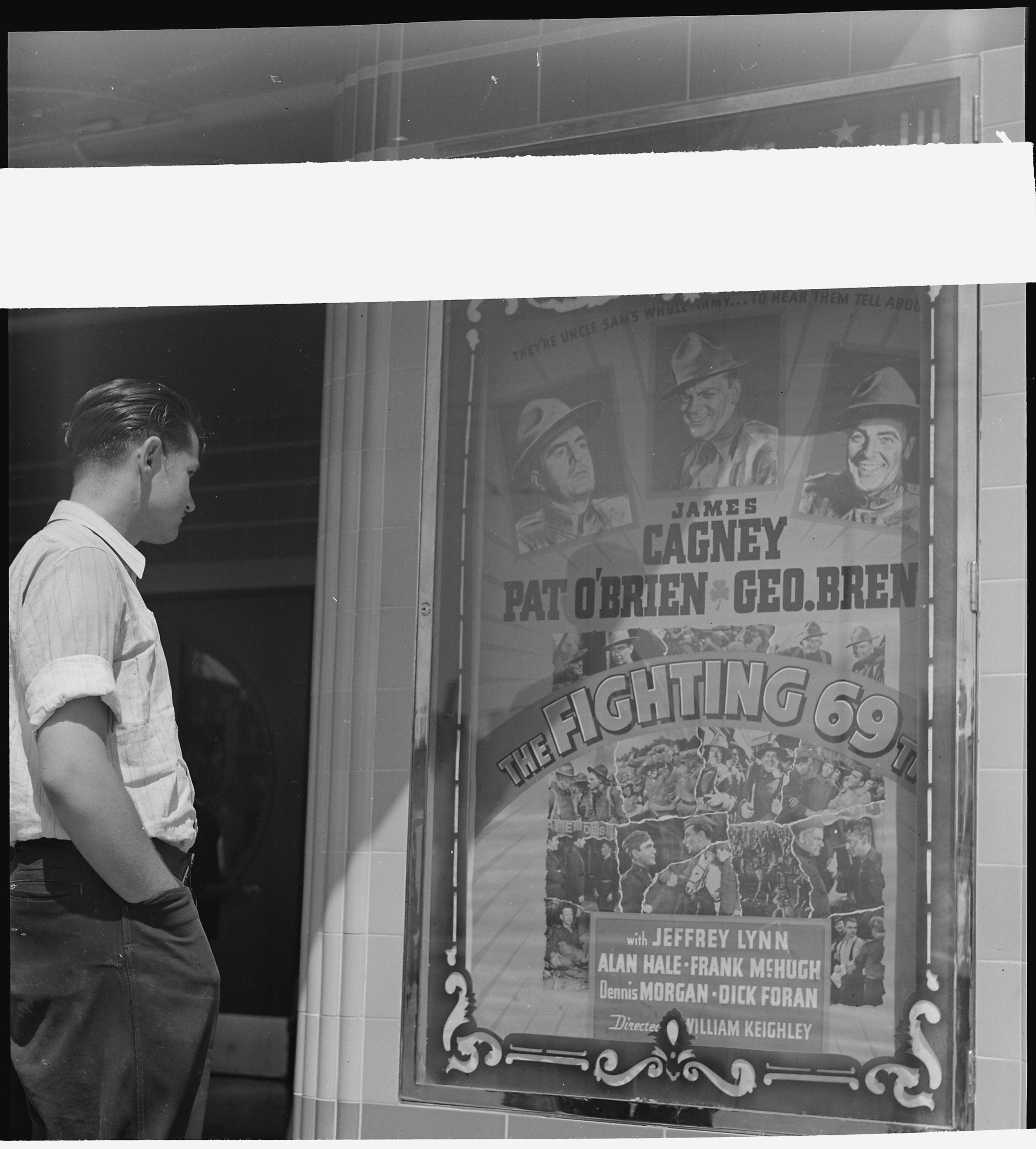
Passerby views original movie poster for The Fighting 69th in 1940

In 1940, Cagney portrayed a boxer in the epic thriller City for Conquest with Ann Sheridan as Cagney's leading lady, Arthur Kennedy in his first screen role as Cagney's younger brother attempting to compose musical symphonies, Anthony Quinn as a brutish dancer, and Elia Kazan as a flamboyantly dressed young gangster originally from the local neighborhood. The well-received film with its shocking plot twists features one of Cagney's most moving performances. Later the same year, Cagney and Sheridan reunited with Pat O'Brien in Torrid Zone, a turbulent comedy set in a Central American country in which a labor organizer is turning the workers against O'Brien's character's banana company, with Cagney's "Nick Butler" intervening. The supporting cast features Andy Devine and George Reeves.

Cagney's third film in 1940 was The Fighting 69th, a World War I film about a real-life unit with Cagney playing a fictional private, alongside Pat O'Brien as Father Francis P. Duffy, George Brent as future OSS leader Maj. "Wild Bill" Donovan, and Jeffrey Lynn as famous young poet Sgt. Joyce Kilmer. Alan Hale Sr., Frank McHugh and Dick Foran also appear. In 1941, Cagney and Bette Davis reunited for a comedy set in the contemporary West titled The Bride Came C.O.D., followed by a change of pace with the gentle turn-of-the-century romantic comedy The Strawberry Blonde (1941) featuring songs of the period and also starring Olivia de Havilland and rising young phenomenon Rita Hayworth, along with Alan Hale Sr. and Jack Carson.

==== Yankee Doodle Dandy (1942) ====
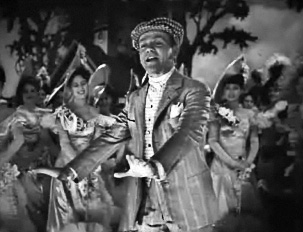
Cagney as George M. Cohan, performing "The Yankee Doodle Boy" from Yankee Doodle Dandy (1942)

"Smart, alert, hard-headed, Cagney is as typically American as Cohan himself... It was a remarkable performance, probably Cagney's best, and it makes Yankee Doodle a dandy"

— Time magazine

In 1942, Cagney portrayed George M. Cohan in Yankee Doodle Dandy, a film Cagney "took great pride in" and considered his best. Producer Hal Wallis said that having seen Cohan in I'd Rather Be Right, he never considered anyone other than Cagney for the part. Cagney, though, insisted that Fred Astaire had been the first choice, but turned it down. Many critics of the time and since have declared it Cagney's best film, drawing parallels between Cohan and Cagney; they both began their careers in vaudeville, struggled for years before reaching the peak of their profession, were surrounded with family and married early, and both had a wife who was happy to sit back while he went on to stardom. The film was nominated for eight Academy Awards and won three, including Cagney's for Best Actor. In his acceptance speech, Cagney said, "I've always maintained that in this business, you're only as good as the other fellow thinks you are. It's nice to know that you people thought I did a good job. And don't forget that it was a good part, too."

Filming began the day after the attack on Pearl Harbor, and the cast and crew worked in a "patriotic frenzy" as the United States' involvement in World War II gave the workers a feeling that "they might be sending the last message from the free world", according to actress Rosemary DeCamp. Cohan was given a private showing of the film shortly before his death, and thanked Cagney "for a wonderful job," exclaiming, "My God, what an act to follow!" A paid première, with seats ranging from $25 to $25,000, raised $5,750,000 for war bonds for the US treasury.

=== 1942–1948: Independent again ===
Cagney announced in March 1942 that his brother William and he were setting up Cagney Productions to release films through United Artists. Free of Warner Bros. again, Cagney spent some time relaxing on his farm in Martha's Vineyard before volunteering to join the USO. He spent several weeks touring the US, entertaining troops with vaudeville routines and scenes from Yankee Doodle Dandy. In September 1942, he was elected president of the Screen Actors Guild.

Almost a year after its creation, Cagney Productions produced its first film, Johnny Come Lately, in 1943. While the major studios were producing patriotic war movies, Cagney was determined to continue dispelling his tough-guy image, so he produced a movie that was a "complete and exhilarating exposition of the Cagney 'alter-ego' on film". According to Cagney, the film "made money but it was no great winner", and reviews varied from excellent (Time) to poor (New York's PM).

"I'm here to dance a few jigs, sing a few songs, say hello to the boys, and that's all."

— Cagney to British reporters

Following the film's completion, Cagney went back to the USO and toured US military bases in the UK. He refused to give interviews to the British press, preferring to concentrate on rehearsals and performances. He gave several performances a day for the Army Signal Corps of The American Cavalcade of Dance, which consisted of a history of American dance, from the earliest days to Fred Astaire, and culminated with dances from Yankee Doodle Dandy.

The second movie Cagney's company produced was Blood on the Sun. Insisting on doing his own stunts, Cagney required judo training from expert Ken Kuniyuki and from Jack Halloran, a former policeman. He continued to study judo for some time after the film was finished. His use of actual judo throws and holds in the movie has been noted as the first appearance of eastern martial arts in Western film. The Cagneys had hoped that an action film would appeal more to audiences, but it fared worse at the box office than Johnny Come Lately. At this time, Cagney heard of young war hero Audie Murphy, who had appeared on the cover of Life magazine. Cagney thought that Murphy had the looks to be a movie star, and suggested that he come to Hollywood. Cagney felt, however, that Murphy could not act, and his contract was loaned out and then sold.

While negotiating the rights for his third independent film, Cagney starred in 20th Century Fox's 13 Rue Madeleine for $300,000 for two months of work. The wartime spy film was a success, and Cagney was keen to begin production of his new project, an adaptation of William Saroyan's Broadway play The Time of Your Life. Saroyan himself loved the film, but it was a commercial disaster, costing the company half a million dollars to make; audiences again struggled to accept Cagney in a nontough-guy role.

Cagney Productions was in serious trouble; poor returns from the produced films, and a legal dispute with Sam Goldwyn Studio over a rental agreement forced Cagney back to Warner Bros. He signed a distribution-production deal with the studio for the film White Heat, effectively making Cagney Productions a unit of Warner Bros.

=== 1949–1955: Back to Warner Bros. ===
==== White Heat (1949) ====
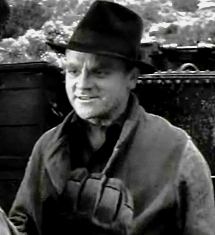
Cagney as Cody Jarrett in White Heat (1949)

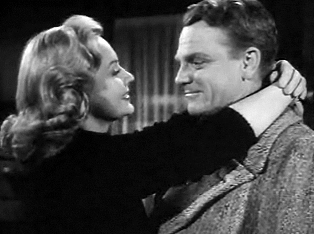
With Virginia Mayo in White Heat (1949)

Cagney's portrayal of Cody Jarrett in the 1949 film White Heat is one of his most memorable. Cinema had changed in the 10 years since Walsh last directed Cagney (in The Strawberry Blonde), and the actor's portrayal of gangsters had also changed. Unlike Tom Powers in The Public Enemy, Jarrett was portrayed as a raging lunatic with few if any sympathetic qualities. In the 18 intervening years, Cagney's hair had begun to gray, and he developed a paunch for the first time. He was no longer a dashing romantic commodity in precisely the same way he obviously was before, and this was reflected in his performance. Cagney himself had the idea of playing Jarrett as psychotic; he later stated, "it was essentially a cheapie one-two-three-four kind of thing, so I suggested we make him nuts. It was agreed so we put in all those fits and headaches."

Cagney's final lines in the film – "Made it, Ma! Top of the world!" – was voted the 18th-greatest movie line by the American Film Institute. Likewise, Jarrett's explosion of rage in prison on being told of his mother's death is widely hailed as one of Cagney's most memorable performances. Some of the extras on set actually became terrified of the actor because of his violent portrayal. Cagney attributed the performance to his father's alcoholic rages, which he had witnessed as a child, as well as someone that he had seen on a visit to a mental hospital.

"[A] homicidal paranoiac with a mother fixation"

— Warner Bros. publicity description of Cody Jarrett in White Heat

The film was a critical success, though some critics wondered about the social impact of a character that they saw as sympathetic. Cagney was still struggling against his gangster typecasting. He said to a journalist, "It's what the people want me to do. Some day, though, I'd like to make another movie that kids could go and see." However, Warner Bros., perhaps searching for another Yankee Doodle Dandy, assigned Cagney a musical for his next picture, 1950's The West Point Story with Doris Day, an actress he admired.

His next film, Kiss Tomorrow Goodbye, was another gangster movie, which was the first by Cagney Productions since its acquisition. While compared unfavorably to White Heat by critics, it was fairly successful at the box office, with $500,000 going straight to Cagney Productions' bankers to pay off their losses. Cagney Productions was not a great success, however, and in 1953, after William Cagney produced his last film, A Lion Is in the Streets, a drama loosely based on flamboyant politician Huey Long, the company came to an end.

==== Love Me or Leave Me (1955) ====
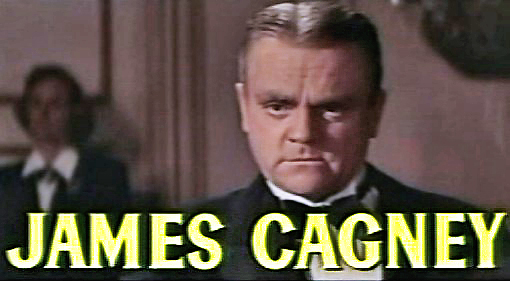
Cagney as gangster Martin "Moe the Gimp" Snyder in Love Me or Leave Me (1955)

Cagney's next notable role was the 1955 film Love Me or Leave Me, his third with Doris Day, who was top-billed above Cagney for this picture, the first movie for which he'd accepted second billing since Smart Money in 1931. Cagney played Martin "Moe the Gimp" Snyder, a lame Jewish-American gangster from Chicago, a part Spencer Tracy had turned down. Cagney described the script as "that extremely rare thing, the perfect script". When the film was released, Snyder reportedly asked how Cagney had so accurately copied his limp, but Cagney himself insisted he had not, having based it on personal observation of other people when they limped: "What I did was very simple. I just slapped my foot down as I turned it out while walking. That's all".

His performance earned him another Best Actor Academy Award nomination, 17 years after his first. Reviews were strong, and the film is considered one of the best of his later career. In Day, he found a co-star with whom he could build a rapport, such as he had had with Blondell at the start of his career. Day herself was full of praise for Cagney, stating that he was "the most professional actor I've ever known. He was always 'real'. I simply forgot we were making a picture. His eyes would actually fill up when we were working on a tender scene. And you never needed drops to make your eyes shine when Jimmy was on the set."

==== Mister Roberts (1955) ====
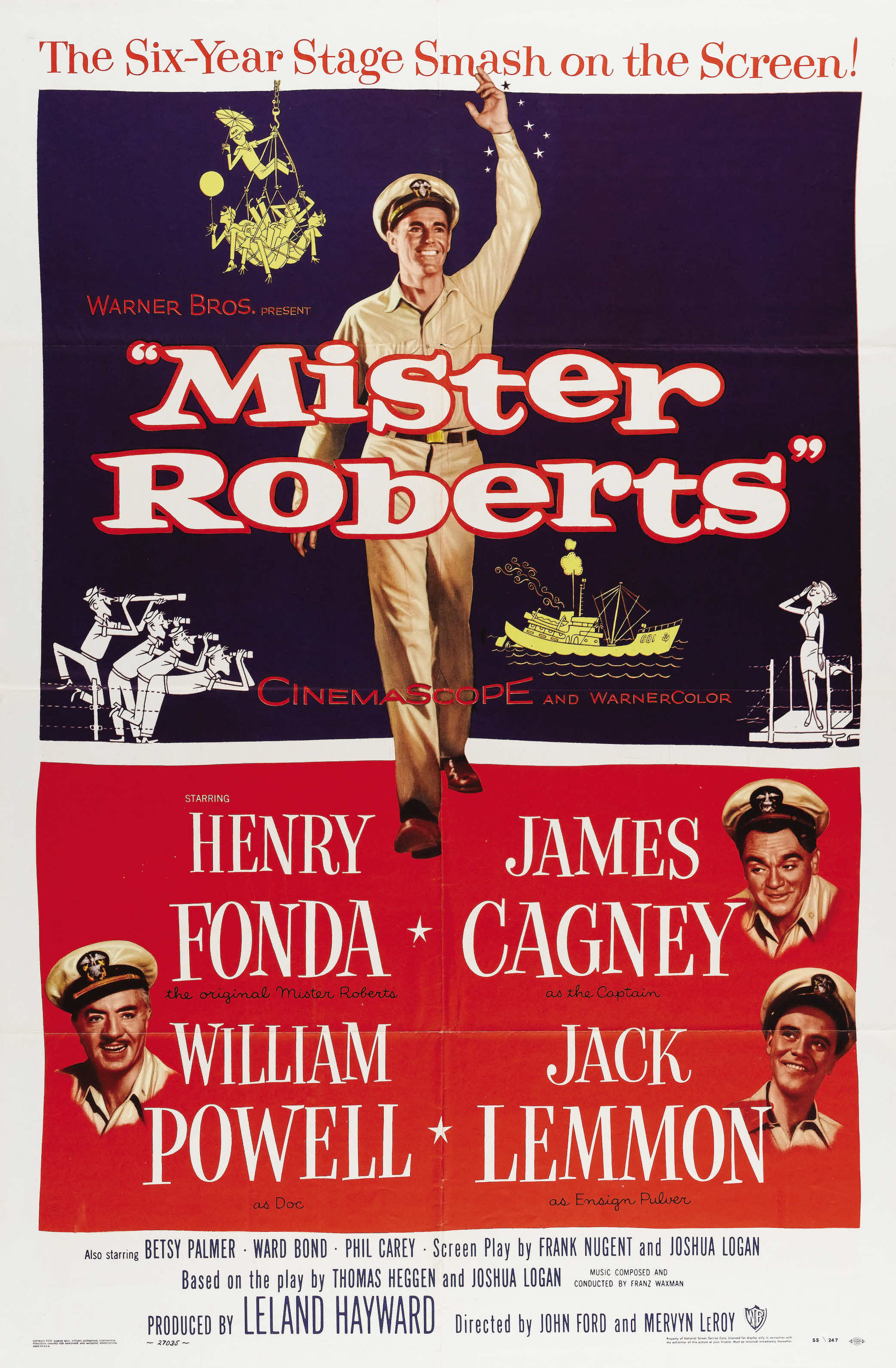
Poster (in public domain) for Mister Roberts (1955) with Henry Fonda, Cagney, William Powell and Jack Lemmon

Cagney's next film was Mister Roberts, directed by John Ford and slated to star Spencer Tracy. Tracy's involvement ensured that Cagney accepted a supporting role in his close friend's movie, although in the end, Tracy did not take part and Henry Fonda played the titular role instead. Cagney enjoyed working with the film's superb cast despite the absence of Tracy. Major film star William Powell played a rare supporting role as "Doc" in the film, his final picture before retirement from a stellar career that had spanned 33 years, since his first appearance in Sherlock Holmes with John Barrymore in 1922. Cagney had worked with Ford on What Price Glory? three years earlier, and they had gotten along fairly well. However, as soon as Ford had met Cagney at the airport for that film, the director warned him that they would eventually "tangle asses", which caught Cagney by surprise. He later said, "I would have kicked his brains out. He was so goddamned mean to everybody. He was truly a nasty old man." The next day, Cagney was slightly late on set, incensing Ford. Cagney cut short his imminent tirade, saying "When I started this picture, you said that we would tangle asses before this was over. I'm ready now – are you?" Ford walked away, and they had no more problems, though Cagney never particularly liked Ford.

Cagney's skill at noticing tiny details in other actors' performances became apparent during the shooting of Mister Roberts. While watching the Kraft Music Hall anthology television show some months before, Cagney had noticed Jack Lemmon performing left-handed, doing practically everything with his left hand. The first thing that Cagney asked Lemmon when they met was if he was still using his left hand. Lemmon was shocked; he had done it on a whim, and thought no one else had noticed. He said of his co-star, "his powers of observation must be absolutely incredible, in addition to the fact that he remembered it. I was very flattered."

The film was a success, securing three Oscar nominations, including Best Picture, Best Sound Recording and Best Supporting Actor for Lemmon, who won. While Cagney was not nominated, he had thoroughly enjoyed the production. Filming on Midway Island and in a more minor role meant that he had time to relax and engage in his hobby of painting. He also drew caricatures of the cast and crew.

=== 1955–1961: Later career ===
In 1955 Cagney replaced Spencer Tracy on the Western film Tribute to a Bad Man for Metro-Goldwyn-Mayer. He received praise for his performance, and the studio liked his work enough to offer him These Wilder Years with Barbara Stanwyck. The two stars got on well; they had both previously worked in vaudeville, and they entertained the cast and crew off-screen by singing and dancing.

In 1956 Cagney undertook one of his very rare television roles, starring in Robert Montgomery's Soldiers From the War Returning. This was a favor to Montgomery, who needed a strong fall season opener to stop the network from dropping his series. Cagney's appearance ensured that it was a success. The actor made it clear to reporters afterwards that television was not his medium: "I do enough work in movies. This is a high-tension business. I have tremendous admiration for the people who go through this sort of thing every week, but it's not for me."

The following year, Cagney appeared in Man of a Thousand Faces, in which he played a fictionalized version of Lon Chaney. He received excellent reviews, with the New York Journal American rating it one of his best performances, and the film, made for Universal, was a box office hit. Cagney's skill at mimicry, combined with a physical similarity to Chaney, helped him generate empathy for his character.

Later in 1957, Cagney ventured behind the camera for the first and only time to direct Short Cut to Hell, a remake of the 1941 Alan Ladd film This Gun for Hire, which in turn was based on the Graham Greene novel A Gun for Sale. Cagney had long been told by friends that he would make an excellent director, so when he was approached by his friend, producer A. C. Lyles, he instinctively said yes. He refused all offers of payment, saying he was an actor, not a director. The film was low budget, and shot quickly. As Cagney recalled, "We shot it in twenty days, and that was long enough for me. I find directing a bore, I have no desire to tell other people their business".

In 1959 Cagney played a labor leader in what proved to be his final musical, Never Steal Anything Small, which featured a comical song and dance duet with Cara Williams, who played his girlfriend.

For Cagney's next film, he traveled to Ireland for Shake Hands with the Devil, directed by Michael Anderson. Cagney had hoped to spend some time tracing his Irish ancestry, but time constraints and poor weather meant that he was unable to do so. The overriding message of violence inevitably leading to more violence attracted Cagney to the role of an Irish Republican Army commander, and resulted in what some critics would regard as the finest performance of his final years.

==== The Gallant Hours (1960) ====
Robert Montgomery, "Bull" Halsey, and Cagney on set

Cagney's career began winding down, and he made only one film in 1960, the critically acclaimed The Gallant Hours, in which he played Admiral William F. "Bull" Halsey. The film, although set during the Guadalcanal campaign in the Pacific Theater during World War II, was not a war film, but instead focused on the impact of command. Cagney Productions, which shared the production credit with Robert Montgomery's company, made a brief return, though in name only. The film was a success, and The New York Times's Bosley Crowther singled out its star for praise: "It is Mr. Cagney's performance, controlled to the last detail, that gives life and strong, heroic stature to the principal figure in the film. There is no braggadocio in it, no straining for bold or sharp effects. It is one of the quietest, most reflective, subtlest jobs that Mr. Cagney has ever done."

==== One, Two, Three (1961) ====
One, Two, Three theatrical trailer

Cagney's penultimate film was a comedy. He was hand-picked by Billy Wilder to play a hard-driving Coca-Cola executive in the film One, Two, Three. Cagney had concerns with the script, remembering back 23 years to Boy Meets Girl, in which scenes were reshot to try to make them funnier by speeding up the pacing, with the opposite effect. Cagney received assurances from Wilder that the script was balanced. Filming did not go well, though, with one scene requiring 50 takes, something to which Cagney was unaccustomed. In fact, it was one of the worst experiences of his long career. Cagney noted, "I never had the slightest difficulty with a fellow actor. Not until One, Two, Three. In that picture, Horst Buchholz tried all sorts of scene-stealing didoes. I came close to knocking him on his ass." For the first time, Cagney considered walking out of a film. He felt he had worked too many years inside studios, and combined with a visit to Dachau concentration camp during filming, he decided that he had had enough, and retired afterward. One of the few positive aspects was his friendship with Pamela Tiffin, to whom he gave acting guidance, including the secret that he had learned over his career: "You walk in, plant yourself squarely on both feet, look the other fella in the eye, and tell the truth."

=== 1961–1986: Later years and retirement ===
Cagney remained in retirement for 20 years, conjuring up images of Jack L. Warner every time he was tempted to return, which soon dispelled the notion. After he had turned down an offer to play Alfred Doolittle in My Fair Lady, he found it easier to rebuff others, including a part in The Godfather Part II. He made few public appearances, preferring to spend winters in Los Angeles, and summers either at his Martha's Vineyard farm or at Verney Farms in New York. When in New York, Billie Vernon and he held numerous parties at the Silver Horn restaurant, where they got to know Marge Zimmermann, the proprietress.

==== American Film Institute Life Achievement Award (1974) ====
Cagney was diagnosed with glaucoma and began taking eye drops, but continued to have vision problems. On Zimmermann's recommendation, he visited a different doctor, who determined that glaucoma had been a misdiagnosis, and that Cagney was actually diabetic. Zimmermann then took it upon herself to look after Cagney, preparing his meals to reduce his blood triglycerides, which had reached alarming levels. Such was her success that, by the time Cagney made a rare public appearance at his American Film Institute Life Achievement Award ceremony in 1974, he had lost 20 pounds (9.1 kg) and his vision had improved. Charlton Heston opened the ceremony, and Frank Sinatra introduced Cagney. So many Hollywood stars attended—said to be more than for any event in history—that one columnist wrote at the time that a bomb in the dining room would have ended the movie industry. In his acceptance speech, Cagney lightly chastised the impressionist Frank Gorshin, saying, "Oh, Frankie, just in passing, I never said 'MMMMmmmm, you dirty rat!' What I actually did say was 'Judy, Judy, Judy!'"—a joking reference to a similar misquotation attributed to Cary Grant.

==== Ragtime (1981) ====
"I think he's some kind of genius. His instinct, it's just unbelievable. I could just stay at home. One of the qualities of a brilliant actor is that things look better on the screen than the set. Jimmy has that quality."

— Director Miloš Forman

While at Coldwater Canyon in 1977, Cagney had a minor stroke. After he spent two weeks in the hospital, Zimmermann became his full-time caregiver, traveling with Billie Vernon and him wherever they went. After the stroke, Cagney was no longer able to undertake many of his favorite pastimes, including horseback riding and dancing, and as he became more depressed, he even gave up painting. Encouraged by his wife and Zimmermann, Cagney accepted an offer from the director Miloš Forman to star in a small but pivotal role in the film Ragtime (1981).

This film was shot mainly at Shepperton Studios in Surrey, England, and on his arrival at Southampton aboard the Queen Elizabeth 2, Cagney was mobbed by hundreds of fans. Cunard officials, who were responsible for security at the dock, said they had never seen anything like it, although they had experienced past visits by Marlon Brando and Robert Redford.

Despite the fact that Ragtime was his first film in 20 years, Cagney was immediately at ease: Flubbed lines and miscues were committed by his co-stars, often simply through sheer awe. Howard Rollins received a Best Supporting Actor Oscar nomination for his performance.

Cagney's frequent co-star, Pat O'Brien, appeared with him on the British chat show Parkinson in the early 1980s and they both made a surprise appearance at the Queen Mother's command birthday performance at the London Palladium in 1980. His appearance onstage prompted the Queen Mother to rise to her feet, the only time she did so during the whole show, and she later broke protocol to go backstage to speak with Cagney directly.

==== Terrible Joe Moran (1984) ====
Cagney made a rare TV appearance in the lead role of the movie Terrible Joe Moran in 1984. This was his last role. Cagney's health was fragile and more strokes had confined him to a wheelchair, but the producers worked his real-life mobility problem into the story. They also decided to dub his impaired speech, using the impersonator Rich Little. The film made use of fight clips from Cagney's boxing movie Winner Take All (1932).

== Personal life ==
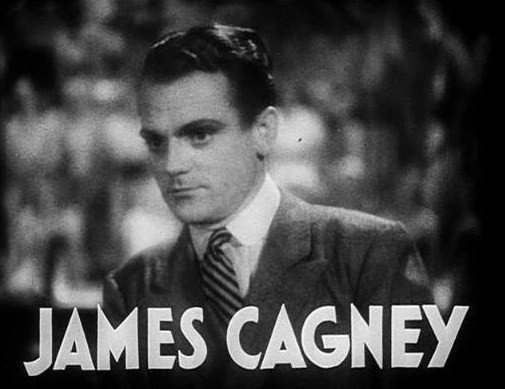
Footlight Parade (1933)

In 1920, Cagney was a member of the chorus for the show Pitter Patter, where he met Frances Willard "Billie" Vernon. They married on September 28, 1922, and the marriage lasted until his death in 1986. Frances Cagney died in 1994. In 1940 they adopted a son whom they named James Francis Cagney III, and later a daughter, Cathleen "Casey" Cagney. Cagney was a very private man, and while he was willing to give the press opportunities for photographs, he generally spent his personal time out of the public eye.

Cagney's son died from a heart attack on January 27, 1984, in Washington, D.C., two years before his father's death. James III had become estranged from him, and they had not seen or talked to one another since 1982. Cagney's daughter Cathleen was also estranged from her father during the final years of his life. She died on August 11, 2004.

As a young man, Cagney became interested in farming – sparked by a soil conservation lecture he had attended – to the extent that during his first walkout from Warner Bros., he helped to found a 100-acre (0.40 km^{2}) farm in Martha's Vineyard. Cagney loved that no paved roads surrounded the property, only dirt tracks. The house was rather run-down and ramshackle, and Billie was initially reluctant to move in, but soon came to love the place as well. After being inundated by movie fans, Cagney sent out a rumor that he had hired a gunman for security. The ruse proved so successful that when Spencer Tracy came to visit, his taxi driver refused to drive up to the house, saying, "I hear they shoot!" Tracy had to go the rest of the way on foot.

In 1955, having shot three films, Cagney bought a 120-acre (0.49 km^{2}) farm in Stanfordville, Dutchess County, New York, for $100,000, from show-business and Army veteran Lanny Ross. Cagney named it Verney Farm, taking the first syllable from Billie's maiden name and the second from his own surname. He turned it into a working farm, selling some of the dairy cattle and replacing them with beef cattle. He expanded it over the years to 750 acres (3.0 km^{2}). Such was Cagney's enthusiasm for agriculture and farming that his diligence and efforts were rewarded by an honorary degree from Florida's Rollins College. Rather than just "turning up with Ava Gardner on my arm" to accept his honorary degree, Cagney turned the tables upon the college's faculty by writing and submitting a paper on soil conservation.

Cagney was born in 1899 (prior to the widespread use of automobiles) and loved horses from childhood. As a child, he often sat on the horses of local deliverymen and rode in horse-drawn streetcars with his mother. As an adult, well after horses were replaced by automobiles as the primary mode of transportation, Cagney raised horses on his farms, specializing in Morgans, a breed of which he was particularly fond.

Cagney was a keen sailor and owned boats that were harbored on both coasts of the U.S., including the Swift of Ipswich. His joy in sailing, however, did not protect him from occasional seasickness—becoming ill, sometimes, on a calm day while weathering rougher, heavier seas at other times. Cagney greatly enjoyed painting, and claimed in his autobiography that he might have been happier, if somewhat poorer, as a painter than a movie star. The renowned painter Sergei Bongart taught Cagney in his later life and owned two of Cagney's works. Cagney often gave away his work but refused to sell his paintings, considering himself an amateur. He signed and sold only one painting, purchased by Johnny Carson to benefit a charity.

== Political views ==
In his autobiography, Cagney wrote that as a young man, he had no political views, as he was typically more concerned with the source of his next meal. However, the emerging labor movement of the 1920s and 1930s soon forced him to take sides. The first version of the National Labor Relations Act was passed in 1935, and growing tensions between labor and management fueled the movement. Fanzines in the 1930s, however, described his politics as "radical".

This somewhat exaggerated view was enhanced by Cagney's public contractual wranglings with Warner Bros., his decision to join the Screen Actors Guild in 1933 and his involvement in the revolt against the so-called "Merriam tax", a method of funneling studio funds to politicians. During the 1934 Californian gubernatorial campaign, studio executives would "tax" their actors, automatically taking a day's pay from their biggest earners, ultimately sending nearly half a million dollars to the gubernatorial campaign of Frank Merriam. Cagney (as well as Jean Harlow) publicly refused to pay and Cagney even threatened that, if the studios took a day's pay for Merriam's campaign, he would donate a week's pay to Upton Sinclair, Merriam's opponent in the race.

Cagney supported political activist and labor leader Thomas Mooney's defense fund but was repelled by the behavior of some of Mooney's supporters at a rally. Around the same time, he gave money for a Spanish Republican Army ambulance during the Spanish Civil War, which he attributed to being "a soft touch". This donation enhanced his liberal reputation. He also became involved in a "liberal group...with a leftist slant" along with Ronald Reagan. However, when he and Reagan saw the direction in which the group was heading, they resigned on the same night.

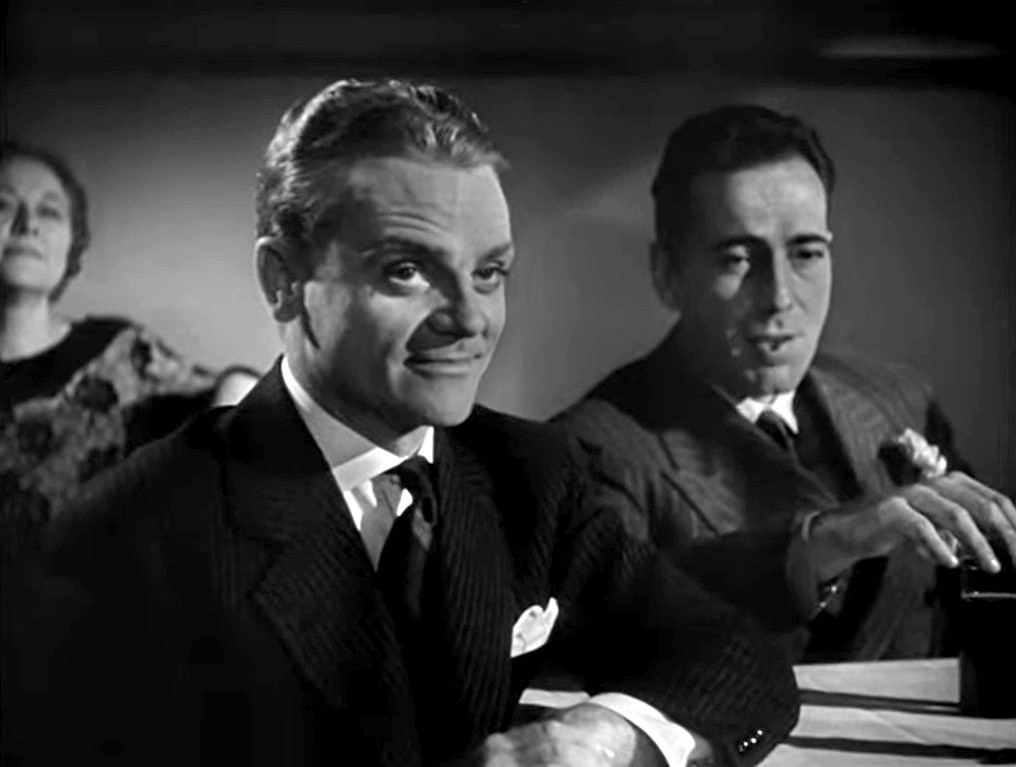
Cagney and Humphrey Bogart in The Roaring Twenties (1939)

Cagney was accused of being a communist sympathizer in 1934, and again in 1940. The accusation in 1934 stemmed from a letter that police found from a local communist official that alleged that Cagney would bring other Hollywood stars to meetings. Cagney denied this, and Lincoln Steffens, husband of the letter's writer, supported this denial, asserting that the accusation stemmed solely from Cagney's donation to striking cotton workers in the San Joaquin Valley. William Cagney claimed that the donation was the root of the charges in 1940. Cagney was cleared by U.S. Representative Martin Dies Jr. on the House Un-American Activities Committee.

Cagney became president of the Screen Actors Guild in 1942 for a two-year term. He took a role in the guild's fight against the Mafia and the Chicago Outfit, which had been using the threat of strike action by a mob-controlled labor union to extort protection money from Hollywood studios. His wife Billie Vernon once received a phone call telling her that Cagney had died in an automobile accident. According to Cagney, having failed to intimidate him or the guild, the Chicago Outfit allegedly sent a hitman to kill him by dropping a heavy light onto his head. Upon hearing of the rumor of a hit, George Raft supposedly made a call that canceled the contract.

During World War II, Cagney raised money for war bonds at racing exhibitions at the Roosevelt Raceway and by selling seats for the premiere of Yankee Doodle Dandy. He also permitted the United States Army to conduct practice maneuvers at his Martha's Vineyard estate.

After the war, Cagney's politics began to change. He had worked on Democrat Franklin D. Roosevelt's presidential campaigns, including the 1940 presidential election against Wendell Willkie. However, by the time of the 1948 election, Cagney had become disillusioned with Harry S. Truman, and he voted for Thomas E. Dewey, his first non-Democratic vote. He would also support Reagan in the 1966 California gubernatorial election.

By 1980, Cagney was contributing financially to the Republican Party, supporting his friend Reagan's bid for the presidency in the 1980 election. Cagney labeled himself as "arch-conservative" in his autobiography. He regarded his move away from Marxism as "a totally natural reaction once I began to see undisciplined elements in our country stimulating a breakdown of our system ... Those functionless creatures, the hippies ... just didn't appear out of a vacuum".

== Death ==
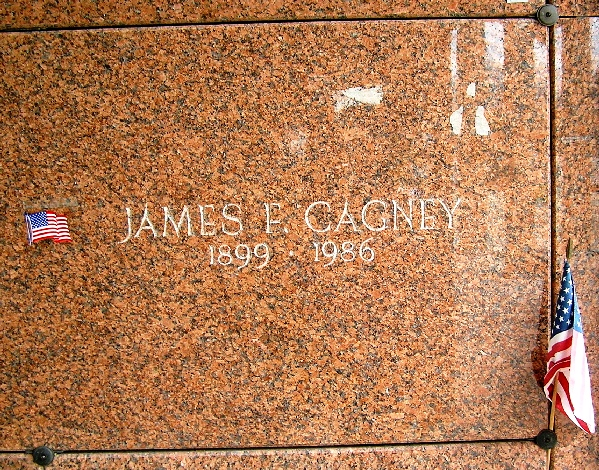
Cagney's crypt

Cagney died of a heart attack at his Dutchess County farm in Stanford, New York on Easter Sunday 1986 at the age of 86. A funeral mass was held at St. Francis de Sales Roman Catholic Church in Manhattan. The eulogy was delivered by his close friend President Ronald Reagan. His pallbearers included boxer Floyd Patterson, dancer Mikhail Baryshnikov (who had hoped to play Cagney on Broadway), actor Ralph Bellamy and director Miloš Forman. Governor Mario M. Cuomo and mayor Edward I. Koch also attended the service.

Cagney was interred in a crypt in the Garden Mausoleum at Cemetery of the Gate of Heaven in Hawthorne, New York.

== Honors and legacy ==
Cagney won the Academy Award in 1943 for his performance as George M. Cohan in Yankee Doodle Dandy.

For his contributions to the film industry, Cagney was inducted into the Hollywood Walk of Fame in 1960 with a motion pictures star located at 6504 Hollywood Boulevard.

In 1974, Cagney received the American Film Institute's Life Achievement Award. Charlton Heston, in announcing that Cagney was to be honored, called him "one of the most significant figures of a generation when American film was dominant, Cagney, that most American of actors, somehow communicated eloquently to audiences all over the world ... and to actors as well."

He received the Kennedy Center Honors in 1980, and a Career Achievement Award from the U.S. National Board of Review in 1981. In 1984, Ronald Reagan awarded him the Presidential Medal of Freedom.

On October 21, 1981, Cagney threw out the ceremonial first pitch of the second game of the 1981 World Series.

In 1999, the United States Postal Service issued a 33-cent stamp honoring Cagney.

Cagney was among the most favored actors for director Stanley Kubrick and actor Marlon Brando, and was considered by Orson Welles to be "maybe the greatest actor to ever appear in front of a camera." Warner Bros. arranged private screenings of Cagney films for Winston Churchill.

On May 19, 2015, a new musical celebrating Cagney, and dramatizing his relationship with Warner Bros., opened off-Broadway in New York City at the York Theatre. Cagney, The Musical then moved to the Westside Theatre until May 28, 2017.

== Filmography ==
Year	Film	Role	Notes
1930	Sinners' Holiday	Harry Delano	Film debut
1930	The Doorway to Hell	Steve Mileaway	
1931	Blonde Crazy	Bert Harris	
1931	Smart Money	Jack	The only film starring both Edward G. Robinson and Cagney
1931	The Millionaire	Schofield, Insurance Salesman	
1931	The Public Enemy	Tom Powers	The film, along with Cagney's character and voice, were used in The Great Movie Ride at Disney's Hollywood Studios
1931	Other Men's Women	Ed "Eddie" Bailey	Originally titled The Steel Highway
1932	Winner Take All	Jim "Jimmy" Kane	Boxing film
1932	The Crowd Roars	Joe Greer	Automobile-racing film
1932	Taxi!	Matt Nolan	Contains the often-misquoted line "Come out and take it, you dirty yellow-bellied rat, or I'll give it to you through the door!"
1933	Lady Killer	Dan Quigley	
1933	Footlight Parade	Chester Kent	Musical film with dancing; as with The Public Enemy, this film was featured in The Great Movie Ride at Disney's Hollywood Studios
1933	The Mayor of Hell	Richard "Patsy" Gargan	
1933	Picture Snatcher	Danny Kean	Newspaper photographer
1933	Hard to Handle	Myron C. "Lefty" Merrill	
1934	The St. Louis Kid	Eddie Kennedy	
1934	Here Comes the Navy	Chester "Chesty" J. O'Conner	
1934	He Was Her Man	Flicker Hayes, a.k.a. Jerry Allen	
1934	Jimmy the Gent	"Jimmy" Corrigan	The first of two films with Bette Davis
1935	A Midsummer Night's Dream	Nick Bottom	
1935	The Irish in Us	Danny O'Hara	
1935	G Men	"Brick" Davis	
1935	Devil Dogs of the Air	Thomas Jefferson "Tommy" O'Toole	
1935	Mutiny on the Bounty	Able Seaman (uncredited)	
1935	Frisco Kid	Bat Morgan	
1936	Great Guy	Johnny "Red" Cave	
1936	Ceiling Zero	Dizzy Davis	
1937	Something to Sing About	Terrence "Terry" Rooney	Stage name of Thadeus McGillicuddy
1938	Angels with Dirty Faces	Rocky Sullivan	New York Film Critics Circle Award for Best Actor; Nominated – Academy Award for Best Actor
1938	Boy Meets Girl	Robert Law	
1939	The Roaring Twenties	Eddie Bartlett	
1939	Each Dawn I Die	Frank Ross	
1939	The Oklahoma Kid	Jim Kincaid	
1940	City for Conquest	Danny Kenny (Young Samson)	
1940	Torrid Zone	Nick "Nicky" Butler	
1940	The Fighting 69th	Jerry Plunkett	
1941	The Strawberry Blonde	T.L "Biff" Grimes	
1941	The Bride Came C.O.D.	Steve Collins	
1942	Captains of the Clouds	Brian Maclean	
1942	Yankee Doodle Dandy	George M. Cohan	Academy Award for Best Actor; New York Film Critics Circle Award for Best Actor
1943	Johnny Come Lately	Tom Richards	
1945	Blood on the Sun	Nick Condon	
1947	13 Rue Madeleine	Robert Emmett "Bob" Sharkey a.k.a. Gabriel Chavat	
1948	The Time of Your Life	Joseph T. (who observes people)	
1949	White Heat	Arthur "Cody" Jarrett	
1950	The West Point Story	Elwin "Bix" Bixby	
1950	Kiss Tomorrow Goodbye	Ralph Cotter	
1951	Come Fill the Cup	Lew Marsh	
1952	What Price Glory?	Capt. Flagg	
1953	A Lion Is in the Streets	Hank Martin	
1955	Mister Roberts	Capt. Morton	
1955	The Seven Little Foys	George M. Cohan	
1955	Love Me or Leave Me	Martin Snyder	Nominated – Academy Award for Best Actor
1955	Run for Cover	Matt Dow	
1956	These Wilder Years	Steve Bradford	
1956	Tribute to a Bad Man	Jeremy Rodock	
1957	Man of a Thousand Faces	Lon Chaney	
1957	Short Cut to Hell	Himself in the Pre-Credit Scene (Uncredited)	Director only
1959	Never Steal Anything Small	Jake MacIllaney	
1959	Shake Hands with the Devil	Sean Lenihan	
1960	The Gallant Hours	Admiral William F. "Bull" Halsey	
1961	One, Two, Three	C.R. MacNamara	Nominated — Laurel Award for Top Male Comedy Performance; Nominated — New York Film Critics Circle Award for Best Actor
1968	Arizona Bushwhackers	Narrator	
1981	Ragtime	Commissioner Rhinelander Waldo	

== Television ==
Year	Show	Role	Notes
1956	Soldier from the Wars Returning	George Bridgeman	Aired on NBC on September 10, 1956 in the first episode of Season 6 of Robert Montgomery Presents
1960	What's My Line?	Mystery Guest	Aired on CBS on May 15, 1960
1966	The Ballad of Smokey the Bear	Big Bear/Narrator	Aired on NBC on November 24, 1966
1974	AFI Life Achievement Award: A Tribute to James Cagney	Honoree/Keynote Speaker	
1984	Terrible Joe Moran	Joe Moran (Final role)	Aired on CBS on March 27, 1984
1985	The Stuntman Awards	Presenter (Not present at the auditorium, speech filmed at home)	Event taped in February 1985 and aired in syndication within a few weeks

== Radio appearances ==
Year	Program	Episode/source
1942	Screen Guild Players	Yankee Doodle Dandy
1948	Suspense	Love's Lovely Counterfeit
1948	Suspense	No Escape
1952	Family Theater	The Red Head
