= Georgann Johnson =

American actress (1926–2018)

- Johnson in 1980
- Born: Georgia Anne Johnson; August 15, 1926; Decorah, Iowa, U.S.
- Died: June 4, 2018 (aged 91); Los Angeles, California, U.S.
- Other names: Georgiann Johnson; Georgianne Johnson
- Occupation: Actress
- Years active: 1952–2007
- Spouses: Stanley Prager (m. 1954; died 1972) Jack Tenner (m. 1981; died 2008)
- Children: 4

Georgann Johnson (born Georgia Anne Johnson; August 15, 1926 – June 4, 2018) was an American stage, film, and television actress. She was also known as Georgiann Johnson and Georgianne Johnson.

== Early years ==
Johnson was born in Decorah, Iowa, the daughter of George and Helene (Hjerleid) Johnson. She attended Decorah High School, Luther College, and Northwestern University before becoming an actress in 1952.

== Stage ==
In 1953, Johnson was cast with her future husband, actor Stanley Prager, in the Broadway revival of Room Service starring Jack Lemmon. Johnson and Prager wed in 1956. Her other Broadway credits include Critic's Choice (1960), Drink to Me Only (1958), and Reclining Figure (1954).

Prager gave up his career as an actor after he testified in 1955 as a witness before the House Un-American Activities Committee. Johnson later appeared in two films directed by Martin Ritt, who had been caught in the Hollywood blacklist as well: The Front (1976) and Murphy’s Romance (1985).

== Film ==
In films, Johnson had roles in Short Cut to Hell (1957), Midnight Cowboy (1969), From the Mixed-Up Files of Mrs. Basil E. Frankweiler (1973), Health (1980), The Day After (1983), The Slugger's Wife (1985), Murphy's Romance (1985) and Quicksilver (1986).

== Television ==
Johnson debuted on television in commercials. In 1965, she played Lois Carter in an episode of The Fugitive, and in 1967, she played Laura Craig in the same series. She played the blind love interest to Charles Bronson, who used his unexpected fortune to pay for surgery to restore her sight, in an episode of The Millionaire. She went on to play Alice Snowden in Archie Bunker's Place, Dorothy Jarvis in Cutter to Houston, Marge Weskitt on Mister Peepers, and Katherine McKay on Our Family Honor. She was also a regular on The Larry Storch Show.

During the 1970s, she appeared in the long-running crossover role of Ellen Grant in Another World and its spinoff Somerset, as well as Jane Spencer in As the World Turns. She played the mother of Jack Tripper in an episode of Three's Company and later played Charlotte O'Neill, mother of the title character in The Trials of Rosie O'Neill. She played Doreen Selvy in Alfred Hitchcock Presents' "The Night of the Execution". In November 1993, Johnson took over the role of Mrs. Elizabeth Quinn on the CBS Series, Dr. Quinn, Medicine Woman during its second season. She continued in the role for the remainder of the series and several made-for-TV movies. She played Kate's mother on Silver Spoons.

== Personal life ==
Johnson married Prager in 1954, and they remained together until his death in 1972. In 1981, she married Jack Tenner. They remained wed until his death in 2008.

== Death ==
On June 4, 2018, Johnson died in Los Angeles at the age of 91.

== Partial filmography ==
- Alfred Hitchcock Presents (1956) (Season 2 Episode 10: "Jonathan") - Rosine Dalliford
- Alfred Hitchcock Presents (1957) (Season 2 Episode 23: "One for the Road") - Beryl Abbott
- Alfred Hitchcock Presents (1957) (Season 3 Episode 13: "Night of the Execution") - Doreen Selvy
- Short Cut to Hell (1957) - Glory Hamilton
- The Fugitive (1965) - Season 3, Episode 15 - Lois Carter
- Midnight Cowboy (1969) - Rich Lady - New York
- From the Mixed-Up Files of Mrs. Basil E. Frankweiler (1973) - Mrs. Kincaid
- The Front (1976) - T.V. Interviewer
- Hart to Hart A New Kind Of High (1979) - Mrs. Capello
- Health (1980) - Lily Bell
- Looker (1981) - Cindy's Mother
- Shoot the Moon (1982) - Isabel
- Three's Company (1982) -Jack Tripper's Mother
- Mama's Family (1983) - Bunny Van Courtland
- The Day After (1983, TV Movie) - Helen Oakes
- Hart to Hart Highland Fling (1983) - Jeannie
- Too Close for Comfort (1985) - Monroe's Girlfriend
- The Slugger's Wife (1985) - Marie DeVito
- Murphy's Romance (1985) - Margaret
- Quicksilver (1986) - Mrs. Casey
- Blind Date (1987) - Mrs. Gruen
- Father Hood (1993) - Judge
- Dr Quinn, Medicine Woman (1993-1998) - Elizabeth Ann Weston Quinn
- Seven Girlfriends (1999) - Anabeth's Mother
- Dr Quinn, Medicine Woman: The Heart Within (2001) - Elizabeth Ann Weston Quinn
- The Deep End (2001) - 50ish Woman (uncredited)
