= A Gun for Sale =

1936 novel by Graham Greene

- First edition
- Author: Graham Greene
- Language: English
- Publisher: William Heinemann
- Publication date: 1936
- Publication place: United Kingdom
- Media type: Hardcover (first edition)
- OCLC: 59545065

A Gun for Sale is a 1936 novel by Graham Greene about a criminal called Raven, a man dedicated to ugly deeds. When he is paid, with stolen notes, for killing the Minister of War, he becomes a man on the run. Tracking down the agent who double-crossed him, and eluding the police simultaneously, he becomes both the hunter and the hunted. The novel was published and filmed in the United States under the title This Gun for Hire.

The novel prefigures Greene's later, more famous work, Brighton Rock, wherein Pinkie Brown's killing of Hale sets the events of the novel in motion in much the same way that Raven's assassination of the Minister of War sows the seeds for conflict in A Gun for Sale.

== Plot summary ==
Raven, an English assassin, is hired to kill a government minister in a European country (in fact, Czechoslovakia), an act calculated to provoke a European war. Returning to London, he is paid off in cash by his contact, who uses the false name "Cholmondeley". However, when Raven starts spending the notes, he discovers they were stolen. Furious at being cheated and hunted by the police who think he is the thief, without a ticket he follows "Cholmondeley" onto a train going to Nottwich.

Also on the train is Anne Crowder, a chorus girl travelling to start work in a pantomime. Her fiancé, Mather, is the detective leading the hunt for Raven. At Nottwich, Raven uses Anne's ticket to get off the station and, since she has recognised him, he takes her to an empty house to kill her. Escaping, she does not report what has happened, out of sympathy for Raven, but instead goes to the theatre to work. There, she is asked out to dinner by one of the backers, Davis, who is "Cholmondeley". After dinner he takes her to a house where, when he realises she knows about his involvement with Raven, he smothers her, though he does not kill her.

The owner of the house helps herself to Anne's smart monogrammed handbag and the next day is seen with it in the street by Raven, who forces his way into the house and finds Anne weak but still alive. She agrees to co-operate with him, since both want Davis/Cholmondeley dead, and he takes her to a hideout he has found. While in hiding, they discuss Raven's murder of the government minister; Raven also talks to Anne about his childhood and the difficult circumstances in which he discovered his mother's suicide—details that will anticipate Raven's own death and the imagery the novel uses to depict his final moments.

In the night, the hideout is surrounded by police, led by Jimmy Mather, and Anne decoys them so that Raven can escape. Nonetheless, Raven has to shoot and wound a policeman to flee. There is gas drill practice, in preparation for war, and everyone, except Raven, is wearing a gas-mask, so he forces a student participating in a rag to undress and give him his clothes and gas mask.

In this disguise, while participating in the rag stunt, Raven spots Davis, without a gas-mask, in the street, and fines him for charity. Davis says he has no cash and will pay him in his office. Going there, Raven discovers it is the headquarters of a giant steel company that will profit hugely from a war and that the boss is Sir Marcus, a corrupt industrialist. Upon discovering that Marcus is Davis/Cholmondeley's boss, Raven takes him at gunpoint up to the suite of Sir Marcus. After explaining his reasons, he kills both men and is himself shot dead by the police.

== Characters ==
- Raven—a cold-hearted assassin for hire. Raven's father was hanged for murder, and his mother committed suicide by cutting her throat. Raven then lived in a home for orphans. He has grown-up in extreme poverty and is highly sensitive about his harelip.
- Jimmy Mather— a police detective trailing Raven. His brother committed suicide, and Mather found his body. Mather joined the police for the stability its routine provides.
- Anne Crowder—a chorus girl engaged to Mather, whom Raven uses as a shield. The two develop a fragile friendship, though in the end she betrays him. The novel ends with Anne and Mather planning marriage.
- Willie Davis (pseudonym, Cholmondeley) —a grossly sensual man employed by Sir Marcus, who betrays Raven by paying him with stolen bank notes. Anne helps Raven get revenge upon him.
- Sir Marcus, a very old and corrupt steel tycoon, who is responsible for hiring Raven to assassinate the Minister. He hopes this will cause another world war and lead to huge profits.
- Saunders—a decent police detective with a heavy stammer. He is Mather's loyal protégé and plays a vital role in the novel's climax.

== Settings ==
- An unnamed Central European capital, meant to be Prague, where Raven murders the old politician and his secretary.
- London, where Raven is paid off by Cholmondeley, where Anne has lodgings but cannot find work, and where Mather is based at Scotland Yard.
- Nottwich, a fictional version of Nottingham, site of the steel works where Sir Marcus lives in a penthouse, where Anne gets a job in a pantomime, and where Raven goes to find and kill Cholmondeley.
- At the time of writing, tensions towards the outbreak of the Second World War were already increasing. Two years before the signing of the Munich Agreement, it was a reasonable surmise to assume that Czechoslovakia would have an important role in the unfolding drama.

== Publication history and adaptations ==
The novel was first published by Doubleday Doran in the US in June 1936 as This Gun for Hire and by William Heinemann in the UK in July 1936 as A Gun for Sale. Several film and television adaptations have been made; a 1942 film version transposed to wartime California starred Alan Ladd and Veronica Lake under the title This Gun for Hire, a Turkish adaptation (Günes Dogmasin) was made in 1961 and 1972 as Yaralı Kurt, and an Italian television mini-series, Una pistola in vendita, followed in 1970. The 1942 film was remade in 1957 under the title Short Cut to Hell and as a TV movie in 1991 starring Robert Wagner.
