= C. Robert Kehler =

United States Air Force general

Claude Robert Kehler
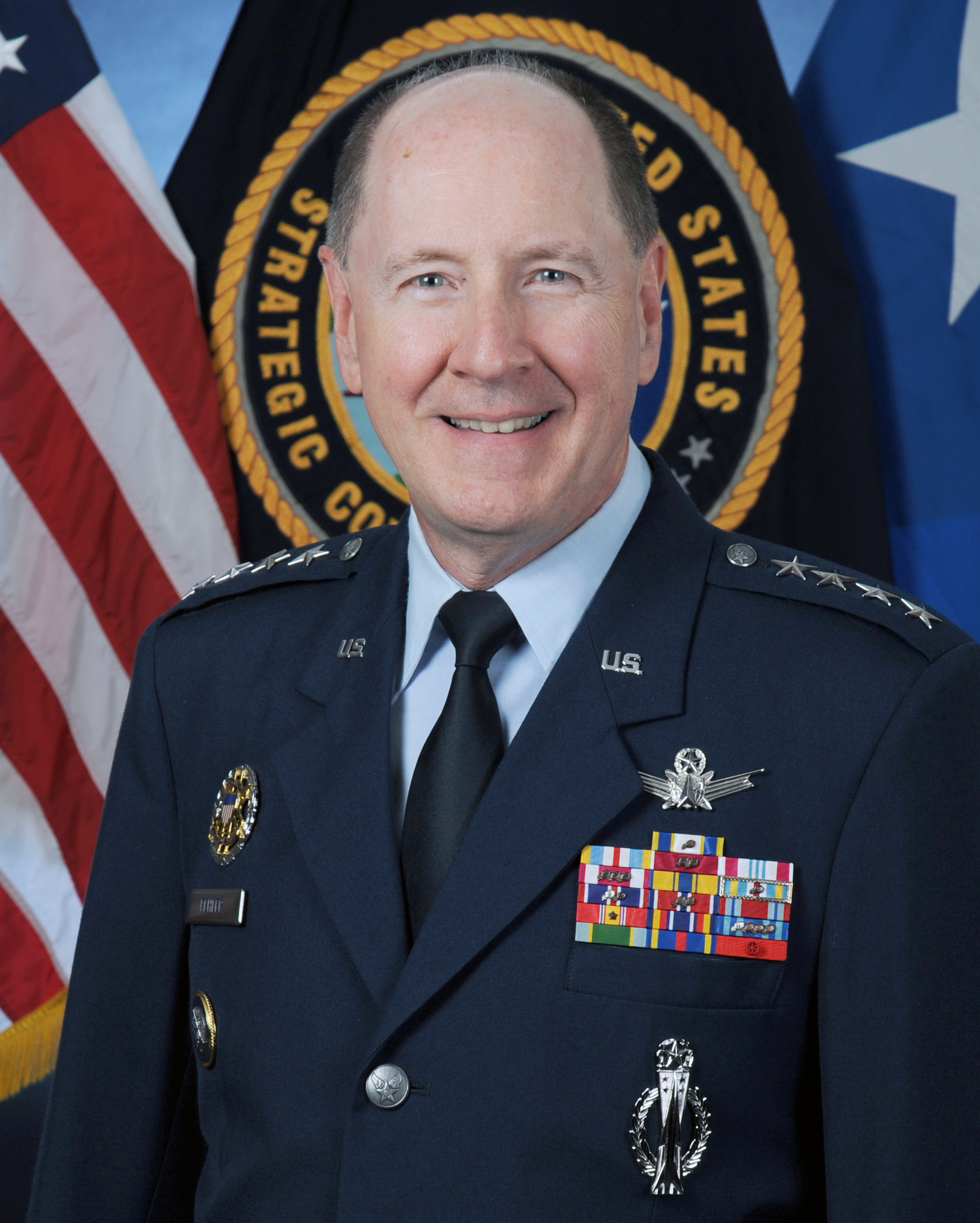
- Born: April 7, 1952 (age 74); Danville, Pennsylvania
- Military career
- Allegiance: United States
- Branch: United States Air Force
- Service years: 1975-2014
- Rank: General
- Nickname: Bob
- Commands: United States Strategic Command; 21st Space Wing; 30th Space Wing; Air Force Space Command; 341st Operations Group; 351st Operations Group; 508th Missile Squadron
- Awards: Defense Distinguished Service Medal; Air Force Distinguished Service Medal (2); Defense Superior Service Medal; Legion of Merit (3)

Claude Robert "Bob" Kehler, (born April 7, 1952) is a retired United States Air Force general who served as Commander, United States Strategic Command from January 28, 2011, to November 15, 2013. He previously served as Commander, Air Force Space Command from October 12, 2007, to January 5, 2011. As a commander of the Air Force Space Command, he was responsible for the development, acquisition and operation of the Air Force's space and missile systems. He oversaw a global network of satellite command and control, communications, missile warning and launch facilities, and ensured the combat readiness of America's intercontinental ballistic missile force. He led more than 39,700 space professionals in providing combat forces and capabilities to North American Aerospace Defense Command and U.S. Strategic Command. He was also responsible for the plans and operations for all U.S. forces conducting strategic deterrence and Department of Defense space and cyberspace operations. He officially retired from the Air Force on January 1, 2014, after nearly 39 years of service.

== Early life ==
C. Robert Kehler was born April 7, 1952, in Danville, Pennsylvania. He spent his formative years in Pennsylvania, graduating from Shamokin Area High School, and early on, decided he wanted to be a Penn State Nittany Lion. He was accepted at Pennsylvania State University, where he earned a Bachelor of Science degree in education in 1974.

== Air Force career ==
Kehler began his Air Force training in college with the United States Air Force Reserve Officer Training Corps detachment at Penn State. While Kehler was in college, the Vietnam War caused a controversy on campus and his ROTC unit was omitted from the Penn State Yearbook for the years 1971–1973. His unit continued to excel though, winning the Air Force Outstanding Unit Award for the academic years 1971-2 and 1974–5. Kehler was a distinguished ROTC graduate and officially entered into active duty service in April 1975.

Shortly, he attended Missile Combat Crew Operational Readiness Training at Vandenberg Air Force Base in California. Once again, Kehler was a distinguished graduate in June. He moved on to serve as a Missile Combat Crew Member, Instructor and an Emergency War Order Instructor at the 341st Strategic Missile Wing at Malmstrom Air Force Base in Montana. As a strategic missile wing in the height of the Cold War, Malmstrom's missile field was the largest in the United States covering 23,500 square miles (61,000 km^{2}) that maintained 200 Minuteman II intercontinental ballistic missiles in four missile squadrons. Crew shifts rotated to ensure individual silos missile had a coverage of 24 hours a day.

While at the 341st Wing, Captain Kehler completed Squadron Officer School, and, as was his tradition, was one of a few named distinguished graduate. He completed his tour with the 341st position in January 1981 and was selected for an Air Staff Training Program internship. He then served as a personnel staff officer at the Headquarters of the US Air Force in Washington, D.C. His first son, Matt was born in February 1982. Shortly after the birth of his son, he was assigned as a missile operations staff officer at Strategic Air Command at Offutt Air Force Base in Nebraska.

From the plains of Nebraska, Captain Kehler, soon to be promoted to major, moved his family to Washington, D.C., in January 1985. In Washington, he served in the Air Force Office of Legislative Liaison as the Chief of the Strategic Missile Branch. He was the point man on Capitol Hill for matters regarding President Ronald Reagan's ICBM Modernization Program. During this assignment, Major Kehler's wife had their second son, Jared, in 1986.

He also completed a Master of Science degree in public administration through the University of Oklahoma at Norman, Oklahoma, in 1987. Following his tour working on Capitol Hill, he attended and graduated from the Armed Forces Staff College in Norfolk, Virginia, from January to June 1988.

Kehler's next assignment was in the Nuclear and Chemical Division of the Joint Staff in Washington, D.C., serving as a nuclear employment and policy planner. He helped formulate revolutionary changes to nuclear war plan structure and targeting. He was promoted to Lieutenant Colonel in 1989.

In July 1991 Lieutenant Colonel Kehler took command of the 508th Missile Squadron at Whiteman Air Force Base in Missouri. As a commander, he was in charge of maintaining and manning 50 Minuteman II ICBMs, keeping them always at the ready. After a year in command he moved up to be Deputy Commander of the 351st Operations Group also at Whiteman AFB, expanding his responsibilities to three missile squadrons. While in this position, he also completed Air War College curriculum through correspondence.

Ready to take command of an operations group, Lt Col. Kehler moved back to Malmstrom AFB in Montana to assume command of the 341st Operations Group, where he had served his first operational tour. During this tour, he was promoted to colonel. In August 1994, Col. Kehler attended the Naval War College in Newport, Rhode Island, graduating with a Master of Arts degree in national security and strategic studies in July 1995. He wrote a paper during his term at Naval War College entitled, "Nuclear Armed Adversaries and the Joint Commander," which was later published in the Naval War College Review.

Following War College, Col. Kehler moved into a number of leadership positions in the Air Force space arena. He and his family moved to Colorado Springs, Colorado where he served as both Inspector General and Deputy Director of Operations at the Headquarters of Air Force Space Command. The Headquarters is responsible for all aspects of US Air Force space issues. In June 1996, he moved on to take command of the 30th Space Wing at Vandenberg Air Force Base in California. The 30th Space Wing launches vehicles into earth's orbit using the Titan II, Titan IV and Delta II rockets among others. The launch range is also used to test new rockets.

In June 1998, the Kehler family again returned to Washington, D.C., as Col. Kehler became Chief of the Space Superiority Division and Chairman of the Space Superiority and Nuclear Deterrence Panel in the Office of the Deputy Chief of Staff for Plans and Programs at the US Air Force Headquarters at The Pentagon. As chair of the panel, Col. Kehler managed the $45 billion Air Force space program through the corporate resource allocation process. He also made a brief stop back in his home state of Pennsylvania to attend the Program for Executives sponsored by Carnegie-Mellon University in Pittsburgh. From September 1999 to August 2000, Col. Kehler served as the special assistant to the Director of Programs in the Office of the Deputy Chief of Staff for Plans and Programs.

=== General officer ===
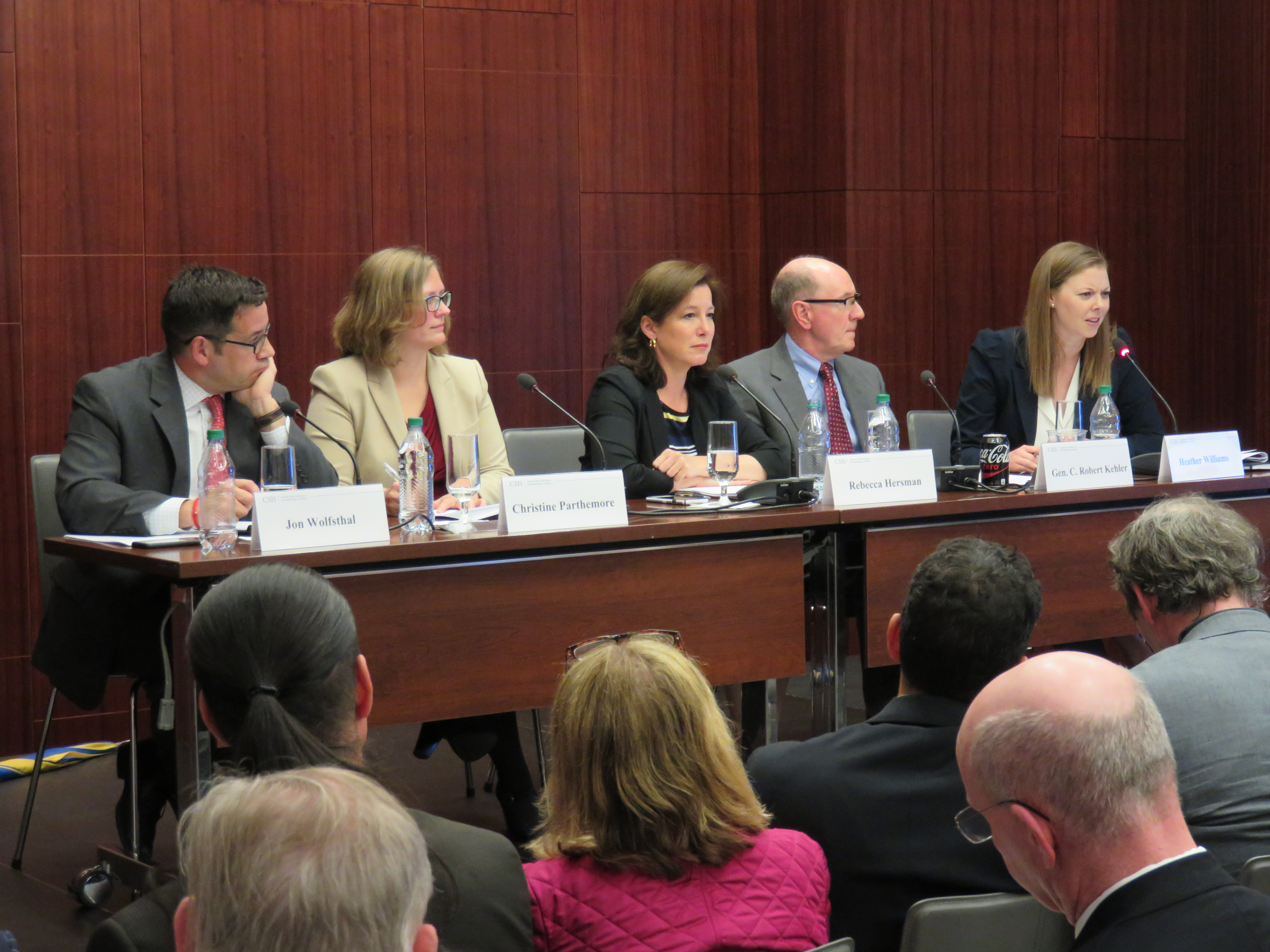
Left to right: Jon Wolfsthal, Christine Parthemore, Rebecca Hersman, General C. Robert Kehler (Ret.) and Heather Williams at the Center for Strategic and International Studies, Project on Nuclear Issues and Ploughshares Fund panel discussion, "Debate: Modernization of Nuclear Missiles", Washington, D.C., 23 May 2017

In July 2000, the Air Force promoted Kehler with his first star and joined the ranks of US Air Force general officers. His first assignment as a general officer was as the Commander of the 21st Space Wing at Peterson Air Force Base in Colorado which supports space surveillance and control.

From his command tour, he returned to Washington, D.C., as Director of National Security Space Integration in the Office of the Undersecretary of the Air Force. As a Director, he integrated the activities of a number of space organizations on behalf of the Under Secretary of the Air Force and the Director of the National Reconnaissance Office. He also picked up a second star while in this position and accepted his promotion to major general on August 1, 2003.

In May 2005, he returned to Nebraska to assume the duties of Deputy Commander for the United States Strategic Command. He earned a third star as well and was promoted to lieutenant general on June 1, 2005. In his role as Deputy Commander, he assisted the Commander of USSTRATCOM in managing the missions of global strike, missile defense, space operations, intelligence coordination, network warfare and combating weapons of mass destruction.

In October 2007, he was promoted to general and assumed the command of Air Force Space Command. He replaced General Kevin P. Chilton, who was promoted to commander of United States Strategic Command.

In January 2011, Kehler once again relieved General Chilton - this time taking over as the commander of U.S. Strategic Command.

After almost three years in this position, Kehler officially retired from active duty on January 1, 2014.

== Education ==
- 1974 Bachelor of Science degree in education, Pennsylvania State University, State College
- 1980 Distinguished graduate, Squadron Officer School, Maxwell Air Force Base, Alabama
- 1982 Air Command and Staff College, by correspondence
- 1987 Master of Science degree in public administration, University of Oklahoma, Norman, Oklahoma
- 1988 Armed Forces Staff College, Norfolk, Virginia
- 1992 Air War College, by seminar
- 1995 Naval War College, Newport, Rhode Island
- 1995 Master of Arts degree in national security and strategic studies, Naval War College, Newport, Rhode Island
- 1998 Program for Executives, Carnegie Mellon University, Pittsburgh, Pennsylvania
- 2002 National Security Leadership Course, Maxwell School of Citizenship and Public Affairs, Syracuse University, New York
- 2006 Program for Senior Executives in National and International Security, John F. Kennedy School of Government, Harvard University, Cambridge, Massachusetts

== Assignments ==
1. April 1975 – June 1975, student, missile combat crew operational readiness training, Vandenberg Air Force Base, California
2. June 1975 – January 1981, missile combat crew member, instructor, senior evaluator, and Emergency War Order instructor, 341st Strategic Missile Wing, Malmstrom Air Force Base, Montana
3. January 1981 – April 1982, personnel staff officer, Air Staff Training Program, Headquarters U.S. Air Force, Washington, D.C.
4. April 1982 – January 1985, missile operations staff officer, Headquarters Strategic Air Command, Offutt Air Force Base, Nebraska
5. January 1985 – January 1988, resource planner, Directorate of Air Force Operations Plans, and Chief, Strategic Missile Branch, Secretary of the Air Force Office of Legislative Liaison, Headquarters U.S. Air Force, Washington, D.C.
6. January 1988 – June 1988, student, Armed Forces Staff College, Norfolk, Virginia
7. July 1988 – July 1991, nuclear employment and policy planner, Nuclear and Chemical Division, Joint Staff, The Pentagon, Washington, D.C.
8. July 1991 – July 1992, Commander, 508th Missile Squadron, Whiteman Air Force Base, Missouri
9. July 1992 – February 1993, Deputy Commander, 351st Operations Group, Whiteman Air Force Base, Missouri
10. February 1993 – August 1994, Commander, 341st Operations Group, Malmstrom Air Force Base, Montana
11. August 1994 – July 1995, student, Naval War College, Newport, Rhode Island
12. July 1995 – August 1995, Inspector General, Headquarters Air Force Space Command, Peterson Air Force Base, Colorado
13. August 1995 – June 1996, Deputy Director of Operations, Headquarters Air Force Space Command, Peterson Air Force Base, Colorado
14. June 1996 – June 1998, Commander, 30th Space Wing, Vandenberg Air Force Base, California
15. June 1998 – September 1999, Chief, Space Superiority Division, and Chairman, Space Superiority and Nuclear Deterrence Panel, Office of the Deputy Chief of Staff for Plans and Programs, Headquarters U.S. Air Force, Washington, D.C.
16. September 1999 – August 2000, special assistant to the Director of Programs, Office of the Deputy Chief of Staff for Plans and Programs, Headquarters U.S. Air Force, Washington, D.C.
17. August 2000 – May 2002, Commander, 21st Space Wing, Peterson Air Force Base, Colorado
18. May 2002 – May 2005, Director, National Security Space Integration, Office of the Under Secretary of the Air Force, Washington, D.C.
19. May 2005 – October 2007, Deputy Commander, U.S. Strategic Command, Offutt Air Force Base, Nebraska
20. October 2007 – January 2011, Commander, Air Force Space Command, Peterson Air Force Base, Colorado
21. January 2011 – December 2013, Commander, U.S. Strategic Command, Offutt Air Force Base, Nebraska

== Awards and decorations ==
Personal decorations
Defense Distinguished Service Medal
Air Force Distinguished Service Medal with bronze oak leaf cluster
Defense Superior Service Medal
Legion of Merit with two bronze oak leaf clusters
Defense Meritorious Service Medal
Meritorious Service Medal with three bronze oak leaf clusters
Air Force Commendation Medal
Unit awards
Joint Meritorious Unit Award with bronze oak leaf cluster
Outstanding Unit Award with silver and bronze oak leaf clusters
Organizational Excellence Award with two bronze oak leaf clusters
Service awards
Combat Readiness Medal
Campaign and service medals
National Defense Service Medal with bronze service star
Global War on Terrorism Service Medal
Service, training, and marksmanship awards
Air Force Longevity Service Award with silver and three bronze oak leaf clusters
Small Arms Expert Marksmanship Ribbon
Air Force Training Ribbon
Foreign awards
French Legion of Honour, Officier Medal

Badges
Command Space Badge
Master Missile Operations Badge
Office of the Joint Chiefs of Staff Identification Badge
United States Strategic Command Badge

== Effective dates of promotion ==
Promotions
Insignia	Rank	Date
	General	12 October 2007
	Lieutenant General	1 June 2005
	Major General	1 August 2003
	Brigadier General	1 July 2000
	Colonel	1 February 1994
	Lieutenant Colonel	1 June 1989
	Major	1 May 1985
	Captain	10 April 1979
	First Lieutenant	10 April 1977
	Second Lieutenant	10 April 1975

Military offices
Preceded by Kevin P. Chilton	Commander, United States Strategic Command; 2011–2013	Succeeded by Cecil D. Haney
