= 351st Missile Wing LGM-30 Minuteman Missile Launch Sites =

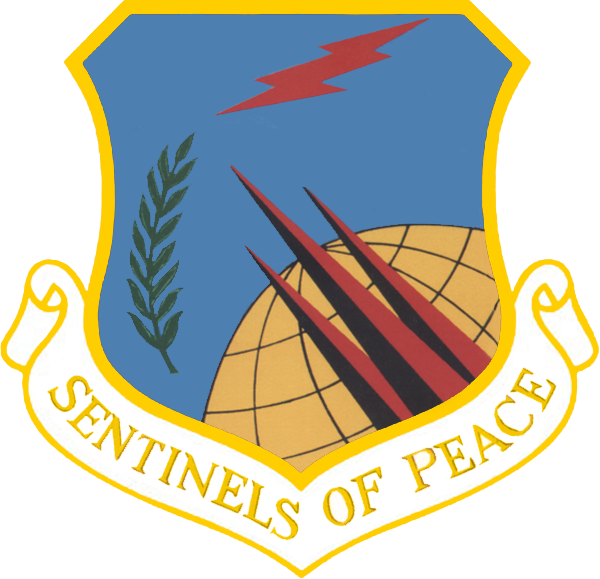
Emblem of the 351st Strategic Missile Wing

This is a list of the LGM-30F Minuteman II Missile Alert Facilities and Launch Facilities of the 351st Strategic Missile Wing, 20th Air Force, assigned to Whiteman AFB, Missouri, and active from 1965-1993.

== Overview ==
The 351st Strategic Missile Wing was the third United States Air Force LGM-30 Minuteman ICBM wing, the second with the LGM-30B Minuteman I. After the announcement on 14 June 1961, there were second thoughts about the choice as original plans called for launchers to be spread into the Lake of the Ozarks region. Due to the terrain inaccessibility and the high water table, these plans were scrapped. Consequently, when the final approval came on 17 January 1962, the launchers were placed in the vicinity of Whiteman AFB, making this the smallest Minuteman base with regard to area.

Activated on 1 February 1963, the 351st Strategic Missile Wing received its first Minuteman IB missile from the Boeing plant at Hill AFB, Utah, on 14 January 1964. Soon the silos assigned to the three operational squadrons of wing were made operational. By 29 June 1964, the last flight of missiles went on alert status, making the 351st a fully operational unit. Beginning on 7 May 1966, and throughout the rest of 1966 and into 1967, the Air Force replaced the Minuteman IBs with LGM-30F Minuteman IIs. The completed transition in October 1967 gave the 351st SMW the distinction of being the first wing to complete the Force Modernization Program. The 351st also had the unique mission of operating the Emergency Rocket Communications System, designed to give emergency orders to surviving US strategic forces in the event of a nuclear attack.

The 28 September 1991 order from President Bush to take Minuteman II missiles off alert status ended the 351st's role as an active ICBM wing. Subsequently, the Air Force removed the wing's 150 Minuteman II missiles from service. The wing and its three squadrons of ICBMs were inactivated on 28 July 1995. Under the START I treaty, the missiles were removed and the sites destroyed over the course of several years. The first silo was imploded on 8 December 1993 and the last on 15 December 1997.

Today, Whiteman AFB is the home of the 509th Bomb Wing and the B-2 Spirit Stealth Bomber. One of the retired Minuteman IBs is on display. In addition, the Oscar One (O-01) Missile Alert Facility (MAF) is now preserved as a museum. Of the 1000 Minuteman LCFs built for the six Minuteman missile wings, this is the only one constructed on the support base itself. Active and retired military personnel with valid identification can tour the facility by contacting the 509th Bomb Wing Public Affairs office. Due to the ongoing "War on Terrorism", it is closed to the general public.

== Facilities ==
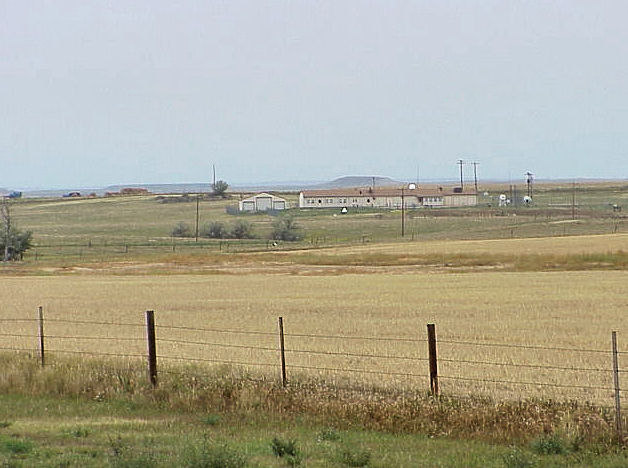
Missile Alert Facility

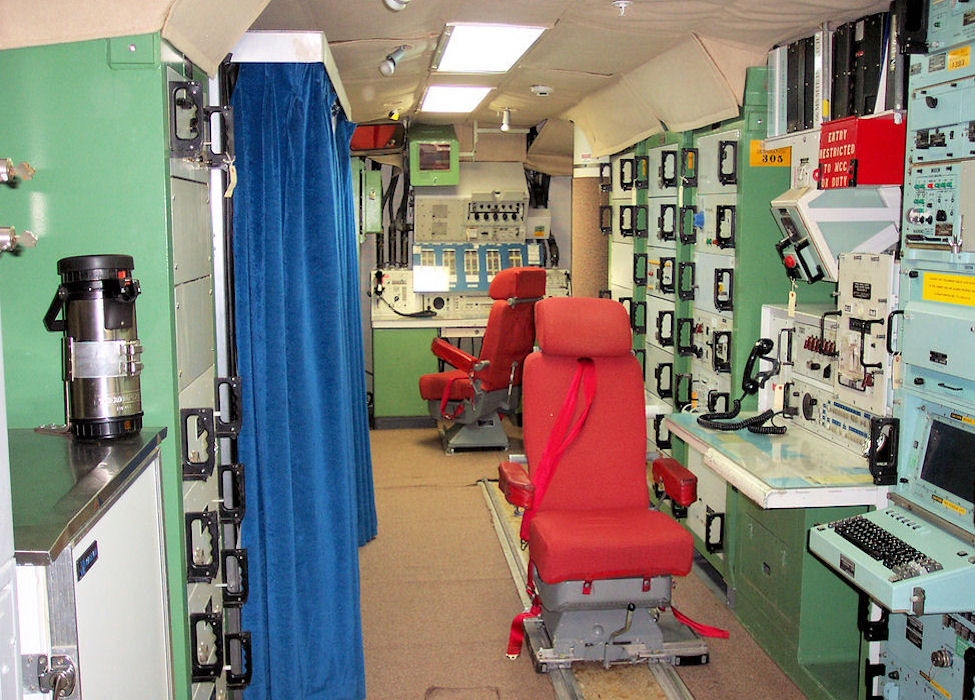
Launch Control Center

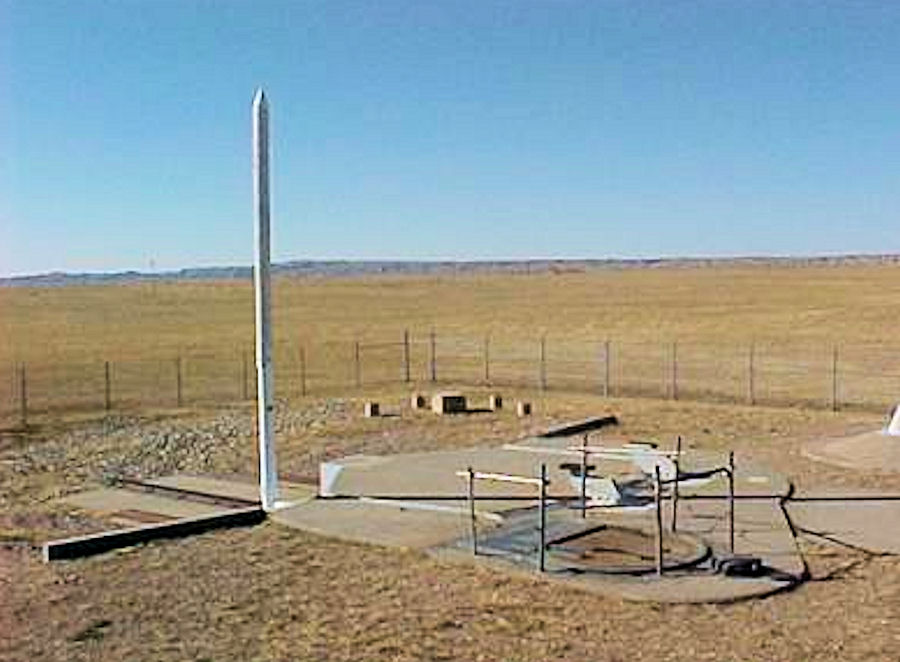
Minuteman III Launch Facility

The Missile Alert Facility (MAF) consists of a buried and hardened Launch Control Facility (LCC) and an above-ground Launch Control Support Building (LCSB). MAFs were formerly known as Launch Control Facilities (LCFs) but terminology was changed in 1992 with the inactivation of Strategic Air Command (SAC). In addition, a MAF has a landing pad for helicopters; a large radio tower; a large "top hat" HF antenna; a vehicle garage for security vehicles; recreational facilities, and one or two sewage lagoons. The entire site, except for the helicopter pad and sewage lagoons are secured with a fence and security personnel. About a dozen airmen and officers are assigned to a MAF.

The underground LCC Launch Control Center (LCC) contains the command and control equipment for missile operations. It is staffed by the two launch officers who have primary control and responsibility for the 10 underground and hardened Launch Facilities (LF)s within its flight which contains the operational missile - several of the 351st's MAFs had consoles for operating the ERCS. Each of the five LCCs also has the ability to command and monitor all 50 LFs within the squadron. The LF is unmanned, except when maintenance and security personnel are needed.

A squadron is composed of five flights; flights are denoted by a letter of the alphabet with the facilities controlled by the flight being designated by a number, 01 through 11, with 01 being the MAF.

== Units and locations ==
=== 508th Strategic Missile Squadron ===
Activated by Strategic Air Command on 9 August 1962. Organized on 1 May 1963. Inactivated on 28 July 1995.

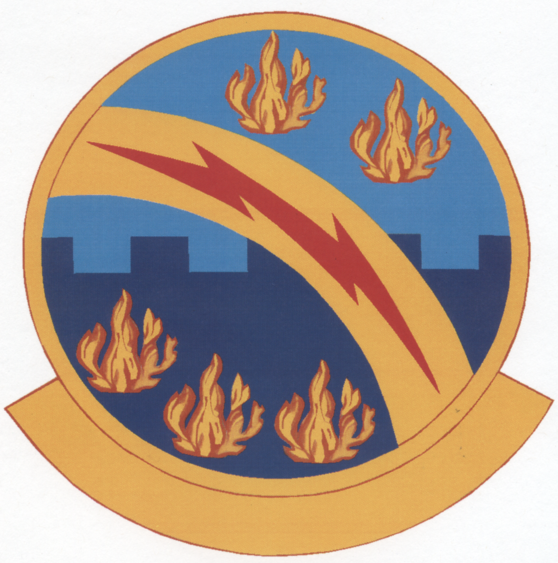
Emblem of the 508th Strategic Missile Squadron

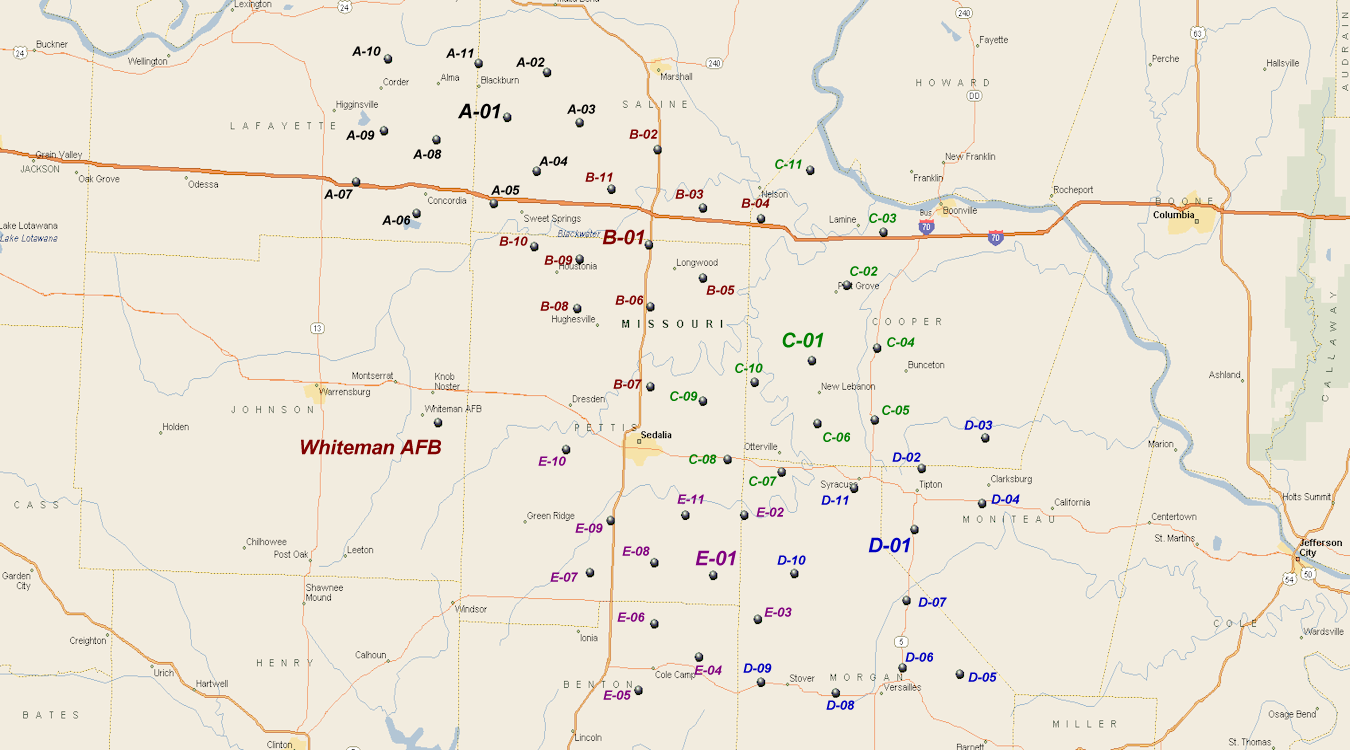
508th Strategic Missile Squadron – Missile Alert Facilities and Launch Facilities

- A-01 (MAF) 3.5 mi SE of Blackburn MO; 24.0 mi NxNE of Whiteman AFB
  39°04′05″N 093°26′20″W

A-02 5.8 mi E of Blackburn MO, 39°07′03″N 093°22′33″W
A-03 9.1 mi ExSE of Blackburn MO, 39°03′45″N 093°19′25″W
A-04 8.3 mi SE of Blackburn MO, 39°00′32″N 093°23′32″W
A-05 9.3 mi S of Blackburn MO, 38°58′23″N 093°27′38″W
A-06 11.4 mi NxNE of Blackburn MO, 38°57′42″N 093°35′04″W
A-07 13.1 mi NE of Blackburn MO, 38°59′44″N 093°40′52″W
A-08 5.8 mi SW of Blackburn MO, 39°02′34″N 093°33′11″W
A-09 9.1 mi ExNE of Blackburn MO, 39°03′08″N 093°38′14″W
A-10 8.4 mi ExNE of Blackburn MO, 39°07′57″N 093°37′52″W
A-11 1.5 mi N of Blackburn MO, 39°07′38″N 093°29′07″W

- B-01 (MAF) 38.1 mi ExNE of Houstonia MO; 22.9 mi NE of Whiteman AFB
  38°55′38″N 093°12′42″W

B-02 12.7 mi NE of Houstonia MO, 39°01′59″N 093°11′52″W
B-03 13.4 mi WxSW of Houstonia MO, 38°58′06″N 093°07′33″W
B-04 18.0 mi WxSW of Houstonia MO, 38°57′23″N 093°01′55″W
B-05 12.5 mi W of Houstonia MO, 38°53′29″N 093°07′33″W
B-06 8.5 mi ExSE of Houstonia MO, 38°51′34″N 093°12′32″W
B-07 11.4 mi NW of Houstonia MO, 38°46′17″N 093°13′22″W
B-08 3.4 mi SxSE of Houstonia MO, 38°51′25″N 093°19′35″W
B-09 2.9 mi ExNE of Houstonia MO, 38°54′42″N 093°18′22″W
B-10 2.8 mi NW of Houstonia MO, 38°55′32″N 093°23′45″W
B-11 7.7 mi NE of Houstonia MO, 38°59′19″N 093°16′19″W

- C-01 (MAF) 5.6 mi SxSW of Pilot Grove MO; 32.9 mi E of Whiteman AFB
  38°47′59″N 092°57′04″W

C-02 1.0 mi ExNE of Pilot Grove MO, 38°52′58″N 092°53′42″W
C-03 6.1 mi NE of Pilot Grove MO, 38°56′29″N 092°50′09″W
C-04 5.5 mi SE of Pilot Grove MO, 38°48′47″N 092°50′47″W
C-05 10.3 mi NxNW of Pilot Grove MO, 38°44′01″N 092°51′03″W
C-06 10.1 mi N of Pilot Grove MO, 38°43′49″N 092°56′33″W
C-07 14.5 mi NxNE of Pilot Grove MO, 38°40′35″N 093°00′01″W
C-08 15.8 mi NE of Pilot Grove MO, 38°41′27″N 093°05′09″W
C-09 14.2 mi NE of Pilot Grove MO, 38°45′19″N 093°07′33″W
C-10 9.8 mi SW of Pilot Grove MO, 38°46′34″N 093°02′33″W
C-11 9.8 mi SW of Pilot Grove MO, 39°00′36″N 092°57′12″W

- D-01 (MAF) 6.1 mi SE of Syracuse MO; 42.3 mi E of Whiteman AFB
  38°36′45″N 092°47′15″W

D-02 5.3 mi E of Syracuse MO, 38°40′49″N 092°46′36″W
D-03 11.1 mi ExNE of Syracuse MO, 38°42′47″N 092°40′27″W
D-04 10.6 mi W of Syracuse MO, 38°38′28″N 092°40′47″W
D-05 17.2 mi NxNW of Syracuse MO, 38°27′09″N 092°43′00″W
D-06 14.9 mi NxNW of Syracuse MO, 38°27′37″N 092°48′26″W
D-07 10.1 mi SxSE of Syracuse MO, 38°32′04″N 092°48′03″W
D-08 16.6 mi N of Syracuse MO, 38°25′58″N 092°54′50″W
D-09 17.8 mi NxNE of Syracuse MO, 38°26′42″N 093°01′58″W
D-10 9.3 mi SW of Syracuse MO, 38°33′51″N 092°58′47″W
D-11 1.0 mi SW of Syracuse MO, 38°39′31″N 092°53′01″W

- E-01 (MAF) 7.3 mi WxSW of Florence MO; 26.8 mi ExSE of Whiteman AFB
  38°33′46″N 093°06′33″W

E-02 5.2 mi WxNW of Florence MO, 38°37′44″N 093°03′33″W
E-03 6.1 mi SxSW of Florence MO, 38°30′52″N 093°02′16″W
E-04 11.6 mi SW of Florence MO, 38°28′20″N 093°07′55″W
E-05 17.1 mi SW of Florence MO, 38°26′09″N 093°13′41″W
E-06 13.3 mi ExNE of Florence MO, 38°30′33″N 093°12′10″W
E-07 17.8 mi E of Florence MO, 38°33′57″N 093°18′21″W
E-08 12.2 mi E of Florence MO, 38°34′37″N 093°12′11″W
E-09 16.1 mi E of Florence MO, 38°37′22″N 093°16′24″W
E-10 21.2 mi ExSE of Florence MO, 38°42′04″N 093°20′38″W
E-11 9.8 mi WxNW of Florence MO, 38°37′44″N 093°09′12″W

=== 509th Missile Squadron ===
Activated by Strategic Air Command on 11 October 1962. Organized on 1 May 1963. Inactivated on 28 July 1995.

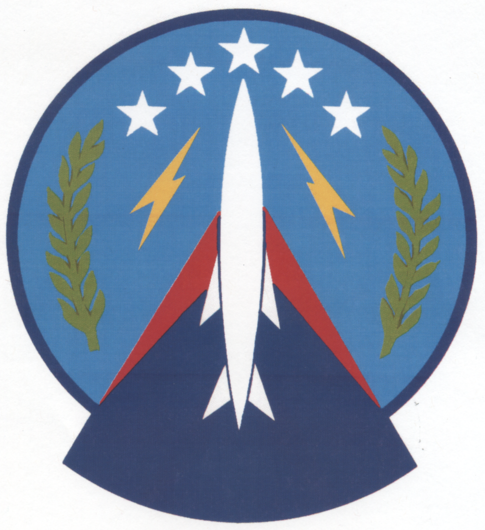
Emblem of the 509th Missile Squadron

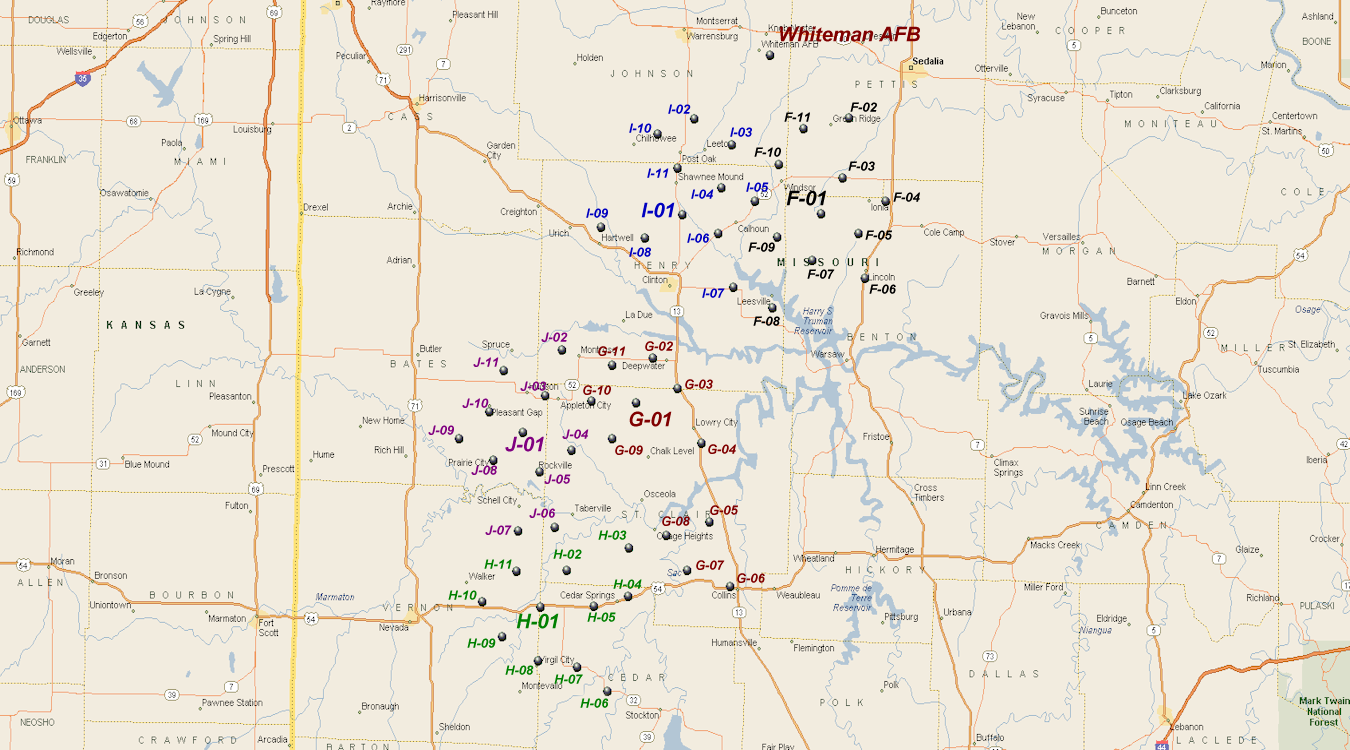
509th Missile Squadron – Missile Alert Facilities and Launch Facilities

- G-01 (MAF) 7.4 mi WxNW of Lowry City MO; 41.3 mi SxSW of Whiteman AFB
  38°11′00″N 093°51′07″W

G-02 9.1 mi NxNW of Lowry City MO, 38°15′10″N 093°48′50″W
G-03 4.8 mi NxNW of Lowry City MO, 38°12′18″N 093°45′35″W
G-04 1.7 mi SE of Lowry City MO, 38°07′10″N 093°42′27″W
G-05 10.2 mi SxSE of Lowry City MO, 37°59′42″N 093°41′13″W
G-06 17.7 mi NxNW of Lowry City MO, 37°53′35″N 093°38′28″W
G-07 15.3 mi N of Lowry City MO, 37°55′07″N 093°44′17″W
G-08 11.9 mi NxNE of Lowry City MO, 37°58′25″N 093°47′06″W
G-09 9.8 mi E of Lowry City MO, 38°07′36″N 093°54′23″W
G-10 12.8 mi ExSE of Lowry City MO, 38°11′07″N 093°57′14″W
G-11 12.1 mi SE of Lowry City MO, 38°14′31″N 093°54′25″W

- H-01 (MAF) 2.8 mi WxSW of Eldorado Springs MO; 66.5 mi SxSW of Whiteman AFB
  37°51′36″N 094°03′59″W

H-02 3.0 mi NxNE of Eldorado Springs MO, 37°55′07″N 094°00′27″W
H-03 9.9 mi ExNE of Eldorado Springs MO, 37°57′15″N 093°52′03″W
H-04 8.2 mi E of Eldorado Springs MO, 37°52′39″N 093°52′12″W
H-05 4.2 mi ExSE of Eldorado Springs MO, 37°51′43″N 093°56′46″W
H-06 11.8 mi NxNW of Eldorado Springs MO, 37°43′39″N 093°54′59″W
H-07 7.9 mi SxSE of Eldorado Springs MO, 37°45′58″N 093°59′03″W
H-08 7.5 mi SxSW of Eldorado Springs MO, 37°46′33″N 094°04′16″W
H-09 8.4 mi WxSW of Eldorado Springs MO, 37°48′48″N 094°09′08″W
H-10 9.7 mi E of Eldorado Springs MO, 37°52′07″N 094°11′53″W
H-11 6.2 mi WxNW of Eldorado Springs MO, 37°55′02″N 094°07′18″W

- J-01 (MAF) 4.7 mi NxNW of Rockville MO; 51.0 mi SW of Whiteman AFB
  38°08′10″N 094°06′27″W

J-02 13.9 mi NxNE of Rockville MO, 38°15′59″N 094°01′09″W
J-03 8.5 mi S of Rockville MO, 38°11′35″N 094°03′27″W
J-04 5.1 mi ExNE of Rockville MO, 38°06′28″N 093°59′53″W
J-05 0.6 mi ExNE of Rockville MO, 38°04′27″N 094°04′10″W
J-06 6.4 mi SxSE of Rockville MO, 37°59′08″N 094°02′04″W
J-07 6.7 mi SxSW of Rockville MO, 37°58′48″N 094°07′06″W
J-08 5.3 mi WxNW of Rockville MO, 38°05′29″N 094°10′27″W
J-09 10.1 mi WxNW of Rockville MO, 38°07′33″N 094°15′03″W
J-10 8.7 mi NW of Rockville MO, 38°10′03″N 094°11′01″W
J-11 11.9 mi SxSE of Rockville MO, 38°14′01″N 094°09′07″W

- K-01 (MAF) 6.3 mi WxSW of Adrian MO; 55.3 mi WxSW of Whiteman AFB
  38°21′16″N 094°27′16″W

K-02 5.8 mi WxNW of Adrian MO, 38°25′21″N 094°27′13″W
K-03 1.6 mi W of Adrian MO, 38°23′47″N 094°22′50″W
K-04 4.1 mi SxSE of Adrian MO, 38°20′21″N 094°20′09″W
K-05 10.5 mi SxSE of Adrian MO, 38°15′41″N 094°16′02″W
K-06 15.3 mi NxNW of Adrian MO, 38°11′07″N 094°16′29″W
K-07 7.7 mi SxSW of Adrian MO, 38°17′43″N 094°24′35″W
K-08 20.8 mi N of Adrian MO, 38°05′46″N 094°20′18″W
K-09 13.3 mi N of Adrian MO, 38°12′32″N 094°23′41″W
K-10 11.7 mi NE of Adrian MO, 38°18′10″N 094°31′47″W
K-11 19.7 mi W of Adrian MO, 38°23′59″N 094°31′47″W

- L-01 (MAF) 5.5 mi SW of Garden City MO; 41.1 mi WxSW of Whiteman AFB
  38°29′55″N 094°15′10″W

L-02 2.1 mi NW of Garden City MO, 38°34′51″N 094°13′13″W
L-03 5.1 mi ExNE of Garden City MO, 38°35′07″N 094°06′06″W
L-04 9.7 mi W of Garden City MO, 38°35′07″N 094°00′48″W
L-05 16.2 mi WxSW of Garden City MO, 38°37′48″N 093°54′14″W
L-06 3.9 mi SE of Garden City MO, 38°31′19″N 094°08′24″W
L-07 14.0 mi W of Garden City MO, 38°33′32″N 093°55′56″W
L-08 10.9 mi WxNW of Garden City MO, 38°30′23″N 094°00′11″W
L-09 10.5 mi NE of Garden City MO, 38°26′37″N 094°18′51″W
L-10 17.5 mi ExNE of Garden City MO, 38°29′18″N 094°30′01″W
L-11 8.7 mi W of Garden City MO, 38°32′35″N 094°20′57″W

=== 510th Missile Squadron ===
Activated by Strategic Air Command on 15 November 1962. Organized on 1 May 1963. Inactivated on 28 July 1995.

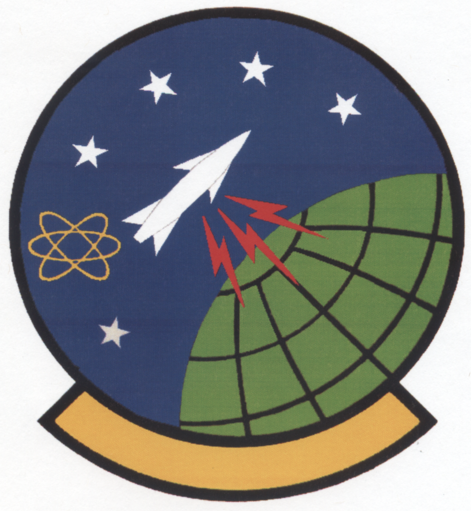
Emblem of the 510th Missile Squadron

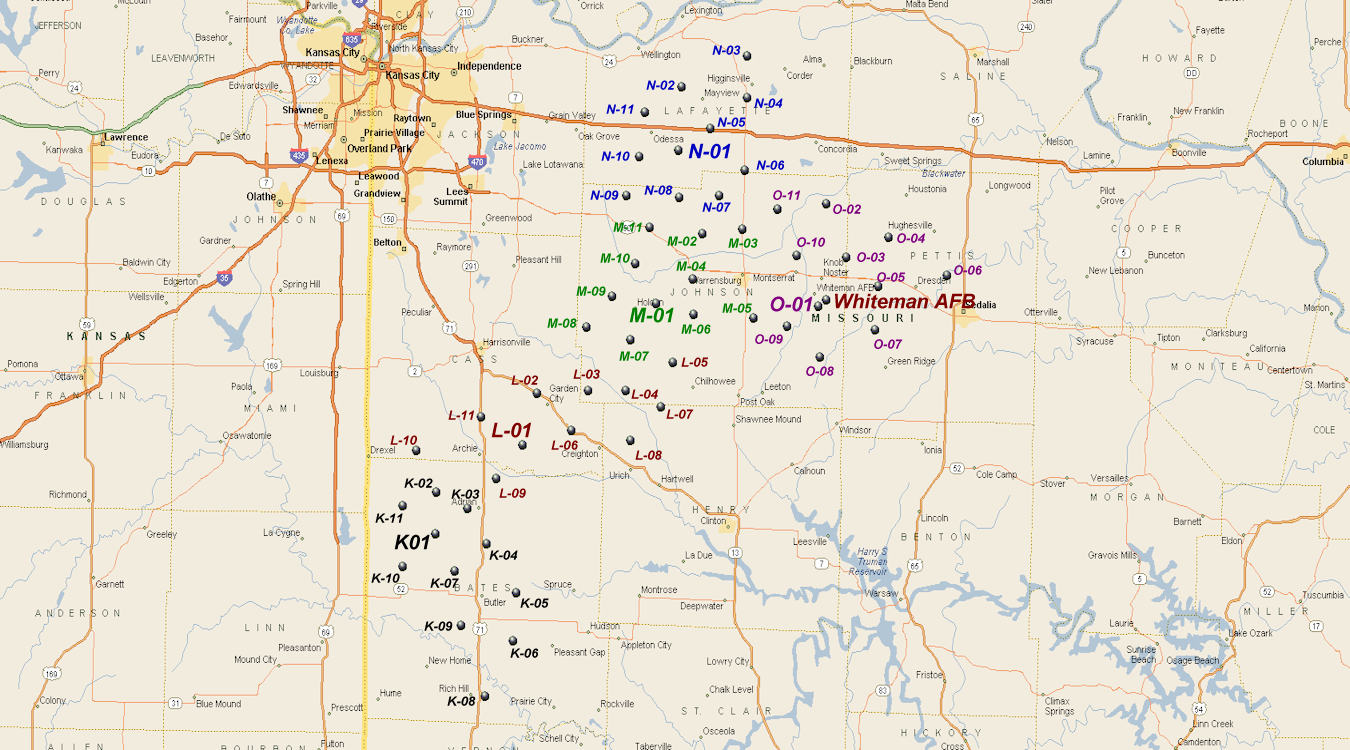
510th Missile Squadron – Missile Alert Facilities and Launch Facilities

- F-01 (MAF) 6.0 mi SE of Windsor MO; 18.7 mi SxSE of Whiteman AFB
  38°28′48″N 093°26′00″W

F-02 10.7 mi NE of Windsor MO, 38°37′53″N 093°22′12″W
F-03 7.5 mi E of Windsor MO, 38°32′12″N 093°23′03″W
F-04 12.9 mi W of Windsor MO, 38°30′00″N 093°17′17″W
F-05 11.0 mi WxNW of Windsor MO, 38°26′57″N 093°20′58″W
F-06 (ERCS) 14.7 mi NW of Windsor MO, 38°22′42″N 093°20′06″W
F-07 (ERCS) 9.4 mi SxSE of Windsor MO, 38°24′26″N 093°27′17″W
F-08 13.8 mi N of Windsor MO, 38°19′58″N 093°32′39″W
F-09 6.1 mi S of Windsor MO, 38°26′38″N 093°31′58″W
F-10 1.8 mi NxNW of Windsor MO, 38°33′29″N 093°31′46″W
F-11 6.3 mi NxNE of Windsor MO, 38°36′51″N 093°28′21″W

- I-01 (MAF) 6.7 mi W of Calhoun MO; 20.4 mi SxSW of Whiteman AFB
  38°28′48″N 093°44′55″W

I-02 12.0 mi NxNW of Calhoun MO, 38°37′30″N 093°43′13″W
I-03 8.5 mi N of Calhoun MO, 38°35′22″N 093°38′08″W
I-04 4.2 mi NxNW of Calhoun MO, 38°31′21″N 093°39′34″W
I-05 3.2 mi NE of Calhoun MO, 38°30′00″N 093°35′00″W
I-06 (ERCS) 2.5 mi WxSW of Calhoun MO, 38°26′58″N 093°40′01″W
I-07 7.1 mi S of Calhoun MO, 38°21′52″N 093°38′01″W
I-08 11.4 mi E of Calhoun MO, 38°26′32″N 093°50′01″W
I-09 16.6 mi E of Calhoun MO, 38°27′35″N 093°55′56″W
I-10 13.7 mi SE of Calhoun MO, 38°36′26″N 093°48′14″W
I-11 (ERCS) 9.3 mi NW of Calhoun MO, 38°33′12″N 093°45′30″W

- M-01 (MAF) 2.6 mi ExNE of Holden MO; 21.0 mi W of Whiteman AFB
  38°43′30″N 093°56′40″W

M-02 11.9 mi SW of Holden MO, 38°50′10″N 093°50′11″W
M-03 (ERCS) 16.1 mi WxSW of Holden MO, 38°50′36″N 093°44′33″W
M-04 8.0 mi ExNE of Holden MO, 38°45′53″N 093°51′26″W
M-05 14.8 mi W of Holden MO, 38°42′08″N 093°43′02″W
M-06 7.3 mi W of Holden MO, 38°42′26″N 093°51′21″W
M-07 (ERCS) 3.3 mi SxSW of Holden MO, 38°40′01″N 094°00′11″W
M-08 6.5 mi WxSW of Holden MO, 38°41′11″N 094°06′22″W
M-09 3.4 mi WxNW of Holden MO, 38°44′11″N 094°02′46″W
M-10 5.2 mi N of Holden MO, 38°47′19″N 093°59′32″W
M-11 9.4 mi N of Holden MO, 38°50′50″N 093°57′33″W

- N-01 (MAF) 3.9 mi ExSE of Odessa MO; 24.5 mi NW of Whiteman AFB
  38°58′14″N 093°53′32″W

N-02 6.3 mi NE of Odessa MO, 39°04′20″N 093°53′02″W
N-03 14.6 mi SW of Odessa MO, 39°07′14″N 093°43′53″W
N-04 (ERCS) 12.5 mi WxSW of Odessa MO, 39°03′17″N 093°43′52″W
N-05 7.5 mi E of Odessa MO, 39°00′16″N 093°48′50″W
N-06 12.3 mi WxNW of Odessa MO, 38°56′17″N 093°44′15″W
N-07 11.0 mi NW of Odessa MO, 38°53′49″N 093°47′49″W
N-08 (ERCS) 8.0 mi SxSE of Odessa MO, 38°53′39″N 093°53′25″W
N-09 7.7 mi SxSW of Odessa MO, 38°53′50″N 094°00′46″W
N-10 3.1 mi SxSW of Odessa MO, 38°57′38″N 093°59′01″W
N-11 2.4 mi NxNW of Odessa MO, 39°01′52″N 093°58′10″W

- O-01** (MAF) On Whiteman AFB, MO
  38°43′14″N 093°33′56″W

O-02 11.4 mi S of Whiteman AFB MO, 38°53′03″N 093°32′48″W
O-03 6.4 mi SxSW of Whiteman AFB MO, 38°47′55″N 093°30′01″W
O-04 11.6 mi SW of Whiteman AFB MO, 38°49′49″N 093°24′08″W
O-05 (ERCS) 7.8 mi WxSW of Whiteman AFB MO, 38°45′07″N 093°25′33″W
O-06 (ERCS) 13.0 mi WxSW of Whiteman AFB MO, 38°46′05″N 093°19′59″W
O-07 7.6 mi WxNW of Whiteman AFB MO, 38°40′57″N 093°26′01″W
O-08 5.6 mi N of Whiteman AFB MO, 38°38′20″N 093°33′49″W
O-09 4.5 mi ExNE of Whiteman AFB MO, 38°41′18″N 093°38′18″W
O-10 6.3 mi SxSE of Whiteman AFB MO, 38°48′06″N 093°36′59″W
O-11 11.9 mi SxSE of Whiteman AFB MO, 38°52′34″N 093°39′35″W

.** Preserved at Whiteman AFB.
