= RAF Polebrook =

Former Royal Air Force station

RAF Polebrook USAAF Station 110
- Oundle, Northamptonshire in England
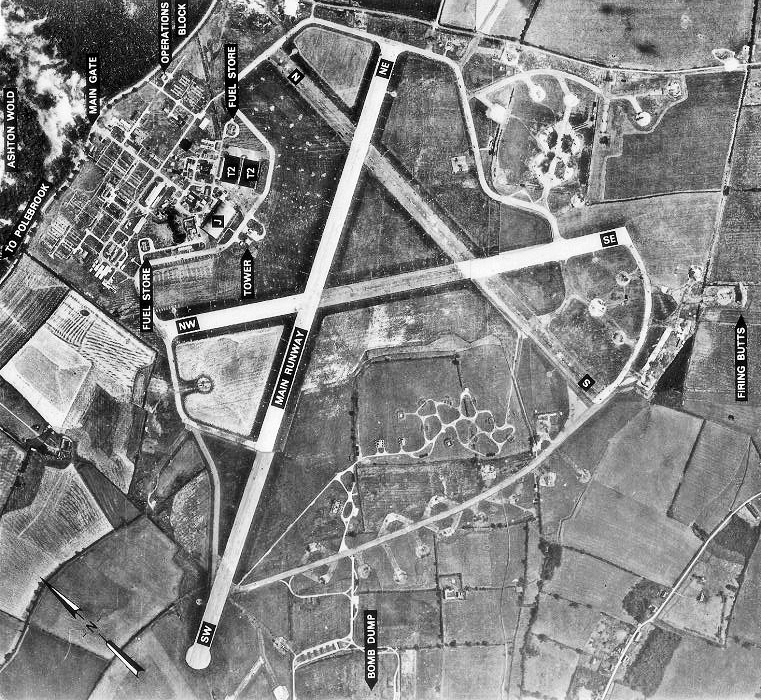
- RAF Polebrook - August 1948

Site information
- Type: Royal Air Force station
- Code: PK
- Owner: Ministry of Defence
- Operator: Royal Air Force; 1941-1942, 1959-1963; United States Army Air Forces; 1942-1945
- Controlled by: RAF Bomber Command; Eighth Air Force

Location
- Shown within Northamptonshire RAF Polebrook (the United Kingdom)
- Coordinates: 52°28′08″N 000°23′25″W

Site history
- Built: 1940
- In use: 1941-1948,1959-1963
- Battles/wars: European theatre of World War II

Airfield information
- Elevation: 70 metres (230 ft) AMSL
Runways
Direction	Length and surface
02/20	Asphalt
08/26	Asphalt
14/32	Asphalt

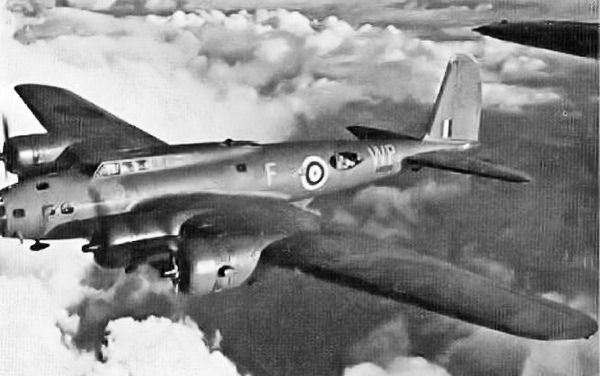
Boeing B-17C Flying Fortress (RAF Fortress I) of 90 Squadron (WP) - August 1941. After their use by the RAF, four Fortress I's were later sent to the Middle East, where, until May 1942, they undertook night attacks against enemy positions at Benghazi and Tobruk. In February to April 1942, five of the remaining Fortress I's in Europe were transferred to RAF Coastal Command.

Royal Air Force Polebrook or more simply RAF Polebrook is a former Royal Air Force station located 3.5 miles (5.6 km) east-south-east of Oundle, at Polebrook, Northamptonshire, England. The airfield was built on Rothschild estate land starting in August 1940.

It was from Polebrook that the United States Army Air Forces' Eighth Air Force carried out its first heavy bomb group (Boeing B-17 Flying Fortress) combat mission on 17 August 1942, and from which Major Clark Gable flew combat missions in 1943.

== History ==
RAF Polebrook was the first airfield to be completed out of a number in the Northamptonshire/Huntingdonshire area which were laid down for RAF Bomber Command during late 1940 and early 1941.

Like other airfields in the construction program at the time, Polebrook was built by George Wimpey & Co., Limited. The initial construction was of three runways, the concrete runway lengths were 08-26 at 1,280 yards, 14-32 at 1,200 yards and 02-20, 1,116 yards. In addition, thirty square hardstands most on the eastern side, were reached by very long access tracks.

The weapons store was unusual in that it lay within the perimeter track at the southern end. One Type J and two Type T-2 hangars were erected on the technical site outside the northern perimeter with the domestic sites dispersed in woodland beyond.

=== Royal Air Force use ===
One of the first units to operate from the airfield was No. 90 Squadron RAF, which carried out operational trials from June 1941 to February 1942. Several of the hardstands and taxiways were still under construction when the squadron arrived.

No. 90 Squadron was equipped with the American B-17C, called "Fortress I" by the RAF. Although the US Army Air Forces did not consider the B-17C as being combat ready (the E-version was already under procurement as the result of combat reports from Europe), the RAF was sufficiently desperate in 1941 that these planes were immediately pressed into front-line service.

The Fortresses were used for very high-altitude attacks in daylight, the first operation from Polebrook being flown on 8 July 1941 when three Fortresses were dispatched on a raid to Wilhelmshaven. Engine trouble forced one of the planes to divert to a second target, but the other two went on to attack the naval barracks at Wilhelmshaven from an altitude of 30,000 feet. Unfortunately, the planes were not able to hit anything from such extreme altitudes. In addition, their crews found that the temperatures at this altitude were so cold that their defensive machine guns froze up when they tried to fire them. However, all planes returned safely to base.

Their last raid launched from Polebrook was on 2 September 1941. RAF Fortresses had flown 22 attacks against targets such as Bremen, Brest, Emden, Kiel, Oslo, and Rotterdam. A total of 39 planes had been dispatched, out of which eighteen planes had aborted and two had been forced to bomb secondary targets because of mechanical problems. Eight Fortresses had been destroyed in combat or lost in accidents. Discouraged by these losses, the RAF decided to abandon daylight bombing raids over Europe.

Although two Fortresses were missing from operations, the only loss resulting from a raid flown from Polebrook involved a badly battle-damaged aircraft that crash landed at a south-coast airfield.

As a result of RAF experience with the Fortress, it was determined that there was a need for vast improvements in defensive gunnery, a need for operating the Fortresses in greater numbers in tighter formations for better defensive firepower, and a need for better and more intensive crew training. Nevertheless, their British crews generally were quite pleased with the Fortress I, regarding it as easy to fly, very maneuverable, and aerodynamically stable in the bomb run.

While at Polebrook, No. 90 was then the sole operational squadron assigned to No. 8 Group RAF and, before it was disbanded on 12 February 1942, its remaining aircraft and crews were only involved in experimentation and training.

The short runways at Polebrook were found to be unsatisfactory for the operation of the heavy-loaded, four-engine B-17. In 1942 the airfield was improved to Class A airfield standards. The main runway was extended to 1,950 yards and the secondary runways to 1,400 yards each. In addition, additional hardstands were constructed, increasing the total number from 30 to 50. This enlargement resulted in the unusual situation that the ammunition storage area was inside the extended perimeter track. The living and communal sites were dispersed in woodlands north of the airfield. They provided accommodation for about 2,000 personnel.

=== United States Army Air Forces use ===
From 12 December 1943 to 12 June 1945, Polebrook served as headquarters for the 94th Combat Bombardment Wing of the 1st Bombardment Division. It was designated USAAF Station 110.

==== 97th Bombardment Group (Heavy) ====
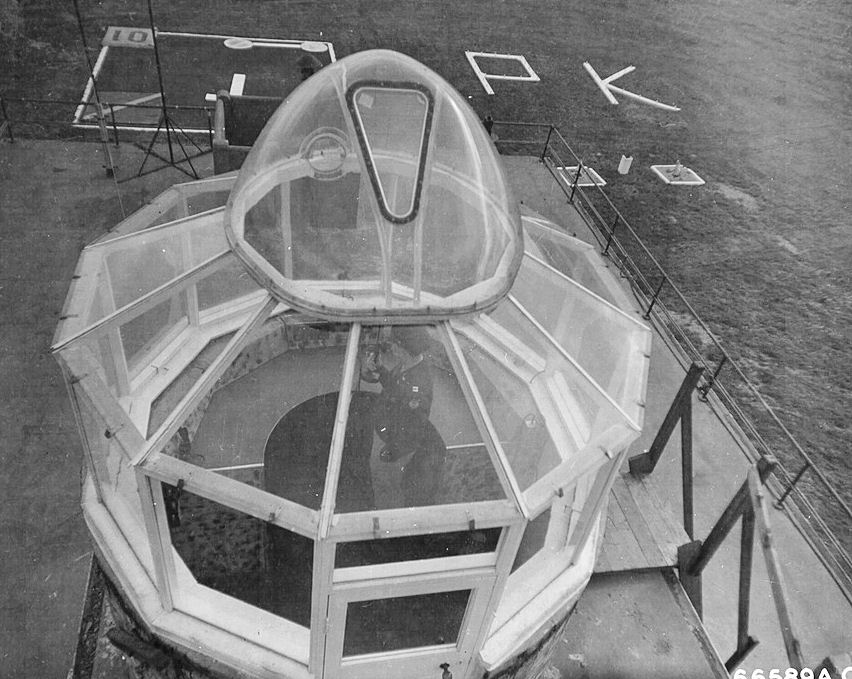
RAF Polebrook control tower, 20 March 1945. Note the use of a B-17 nose plexiglass. Also shows Signals Square

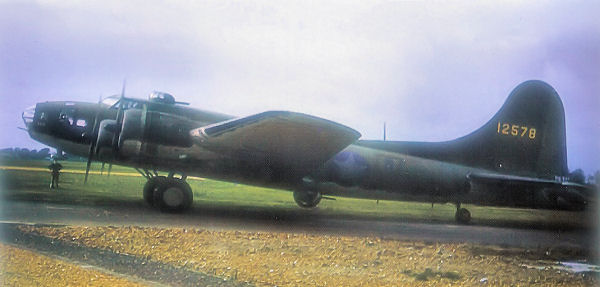
Boeing B-17E Fortress Serial 41-2578. This aircraft was the oldest and longest serving B-17 in the Eighth Air Force. While with the 97th Bomb Group on 17 August 1942, this was the lead aircraft in the first Eighth Air Force heavy bombing mission. Later, this aircraft was used for training combat replacement crews with the 11th Combat Crew Replacement Unit at RAF Bovingdon until 1945.

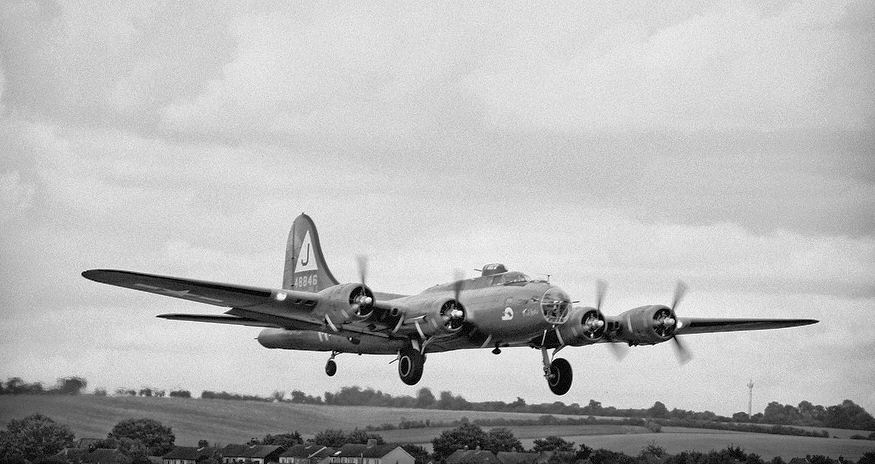
Boeing B-17G-95-BO Fortress 43-38846, 351st Bombardment Group

On 28 June 1942, RAF Polebrook was officially turned over to the United States Army Air Forces (USAAF) and the airbase became the base of the 97th Bombardment Group, the first USAAF heavy bomber organization to arrive in the UK.

The 97th BG was assigned to the 1st Combat Wing, at RAF Bassingbourn. Its operational squadrons were divided between Polebrook and RAF Grafton Underwood:

- 340th Bombardment Squadron (RAF Polebrook)
- 341st Bombardment Squadron (RAF Polebrook)
- 342nd Bombardment Squadron (RAF Grafton Underwood)
- 414th Bombardment Squadron (RAF Grafton Underwood)

The 97th Bomb Group is famous for flying the first all-American Flying Fortress bombing mission originating from Grafton Underwood against German-occupied territory in Europe on August 17, 1942, by attacking the railway marshalling yards at Sotteville-lès-Rouen in France. The lead aircraft in the first flight group of six B-17s was Butcher Shop, which was piloted by the Group Commander Colonel Frank A. Armstrong, and copiloted by the squadron commander of the 340th Captain Paul W. Tibbets (who later flew the Enola Gay to Hiroshima Japan on the first atomic bomb mission). The lead aircraft in the second flight group of six B-17s was B-17E Yankee Doodle 41-9023, which was copiloted by 2nd Lt. John R. Dowswell and piloted by Captain Rudolph Emil "Rudy" Flack the squadron commander of the 414th, Grafton Underwood base commander and mission commander (http://www.americanairmuseum.com/person/246743), and who carried Brig. General Ira C. Eaker the commander of the VIII Bomber Command as an observer on board his Flying Fortress.

The 97th BG conducted a total of 16 missions from Polebrook and Grafton Underwood, attacking airfields, marshalling yards, industries, naval installations, and other targets in France and the Low Countries.

The group sortied 247 aircraft, dropped 395 tons of bombs on Nazi-controlled territory, and lost 14 aircraft. On 21 October 1942, the 97th Bomb Group was transferred to the Twelfth Air Force in the Mediterranean theatre and Polebrook was unoccupied until April 1943.

==== 351st Bombardment Group (Heavy) ====
On 15 April 1943, the 351st Bomb Group arrived at RAF Polebrook. It was assigned to the 94th Combat Wing, also at Polebrook. The group tail code was a "Triangle J". Its operational squadrons were:

- 508th Bombardment Squadron (YB)
- 509th Bombardment Squadron (RQ)
- 510th Bombardment Squadron (TU)
- 511th Bombardment Squadron (DS)

The 351st's first completed combat mission took place on 14 May 1943, when 18 B-17s targeted a German Luftwaffe airfield at Kortrijk, Belgium. As the war progressed, the 351st operated primarily against strategic objectives in Germany, striking such targets as ball-bearing plants at Schweinfurt, communications at Mayen, marshalling yards at Koblenz, a locomotive and tank factory at Hanover, industries at Berlin, bridges at Cologne, an armaments factory at Mannheim, and oil refineries at Hamburg.

The group also struck harbor facilities, submarine installations, airfields, V-weapon sites, and power plants in France, Belgium, the Netherlands, and Norway.

The 351st Received a Distinguished Unit Citation for performance of 9 October 1943 when an aircraft factory in Germany was accurately bombed in spite of heavy flak and pressing enemy interceptors. It received another DUC for its part in the successful attack of 11 January 1944 on aircraft factories in central Germany. The group participated in the intensive air campaign against the German aircraft industry during Big Week, 20−25 February 1944.

In addition to its strategic missions, the group often operated in support of ground forces and attacked interdictory targets. Bombed in support of the Battle of Normandy in June 1944 and the Saint-Lô breakthrough in July. The group hit enemy positions to cover the airborne attack on the Netherlands in September 1944. Struck front-line positions, communications, and airfields to help stop the German counteroffensive in the Battle of the Bulge, December 1944-January 1945. Flew missions in support of Operation Varsity, the airborne assault across the Rhine in March 1945.

In 1944 Polebrook also became the headquarters of the 94th Combat Wing, which controlled the 351st, the 457th Bomb Group at RAF Glatton and the 401st Bomb Group at RAF Deenethorpe.

The 351st conducted routine 8th Air Force missions from RAF Polebrook until the end of the war. The unit completed 311 combat missions from Polebrook. The 351st lost 175 B-17s and their crews. The gunners in the Group fired off 2,776,028 rounds of ammunition and were credited with destroying 303 enemy aircraft. The 509th Bomb Squadron completed 54 consecutive missions without losses between June 1943 to January 1944.

The unit returned to the US soon after V-E Day with the air element leaving 21 May and the ground echelon sailing 25 June. Reassigned to Sioux Falls AAF, South Dakota during August 1945. The 391st Bomb Group was inactivated on 28 August 1945.

RAF Polebrook was subsequently returned to the RAF on 28 August 1945, and the base was placed on care and maintenance status.

===== Medal of Honor =====
Two members of the 351st, Lt. Walter E. Truemper and S/Sgt. Archibald Mathies, were posthumously awarded the Medal of Honor. On a mission to Leipzig, Germany, 20 February 1944 their B-17 Ten Horsepower was attacked by German fighters. The co-pilot was killed and pilot Lt. Clarence Nelson was badly wounded. Truemper and Mathies flew the badly damaged B-17 back to England where the remainder of the crew bailed out, then attempted to land the plane to save the life of the unconscious pilot. On their third attempt Ten Horsepower crashed on final approach and all three airmen were killed.

Legacy

During the Cold War, the United States Air Force Strategic Air Command 351st Strategic Missile Wing stood alert with Minuteman I and later, Minuteman II ICBMs starting in 1963 at Whiteman AFB Missouri. The wing was bestowed the lineage, honours and history of the World War II USAAF 351st Bomb Wing upon activation.

The 351st SMW won the SAC missile combat competitions and Blanchard Trophy in 1967, 1971, and 1977. Named as SAC's "best Minuteman wing" in 1972, it stood down from alert and was inactivated in 1995.

==== Hollywood at Polebrook ====
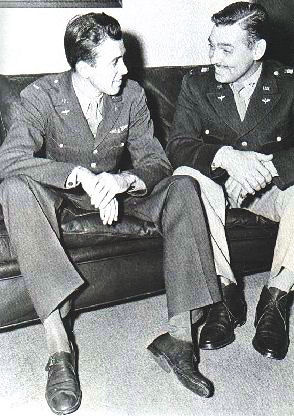
Lt. James M. Stewart & Lt. Clark Gable, 1943

During much of 1943, Captain Clark Gable was stationed at Polebrook to produce a recruiting film for aircraft gunners. He had trained with the 351st Bomb Group at Biggs Army Air Base, Texas, and Pueblo Army Air Base, Colorado, then accompanied it overseas in early April 1943. Much of the film was shot by former MGM cinematographer First Lieutenant Andrew McIntyre, whom MGM had arranged to enter duty with and accompany Gable in training, and scripting was by John Lee Mahin, a Hollywood screenwriter also in the unit. While with the 351st Gable flew five combat missions as an observer.

1) Gable's first combat mission occurred on 4 May 1943, when Gable accompanied 351st group commander Lt. Col. William A. Hatcher on a late afternoon familiarization mission before the 351st became operational. Flying squadron lead with Capt William R. Calhoun of the 303rd Bomb Group, RAF Molesworth, against the Ford and General Motors plants at Antwerp, Belgium, Hatcher and Gable's B-17 was nicknamed The 8 Ball MK II (s/n 41-24635). Gable fired a few rounds from a machine gun mounted in the radio room and suffered a minor case of frostbite from wearing leather gloves in the extreme cold.

2) Gable's second mission came 10 July 1943, flying with Second Lt. Theodore Argiropulos of the 351st's 508th Bomb Squadron in Argonaut III (42-29851) to bomb the airfield at Villacoublay, France. The mission was frustrating in that clouds forced the bombers to return without dropping their ordnance, but did not prevent German fighter attacks.

3) His third combat mission occurred on 24 July 1943, again in Argonaut III as the lead aircraft of the 351st, with group executive officer Lt.Col. Robert W. Burns. The mission to bomb the Norsk Hydro chemical plants in Herøya, Norway, was unopposed, but was also the longest by the Eighth Air Force to that date and began a week-long series of intensive operations against German targets known as the "Blitz Week".

4) On the morning of 12 August 1943, his fourth mission was to bomb a synthetic oil plant at Gelsenkirchen in the Ruhr, joining 351st operations officer Maj. Theodore "Ross" Milton and Capt. John B. Carraway's crew in Ain't It Gruesome (42-29863). Bombing Bochum, Germany, as a target of opportunity in bad weather, Gable experienced the Eighth's most dangerous mission to date, with 25 of its 330 B-17s shot down. Although none of the 351st's Fortresses went down, 11 suffered battle damage, one crash-landed on return, and the group's crews suffered one killed and seven wounded. During the mission, Gable wedged himself behind the top turret gunner for a better view as German fighters made five passes at the 351st's formation. A 20mm shell came up through Aint It Gruesome's flight deck, cut off the heel from Gable's boot, and exited one foot from his head, all without exploding. Afterward, the crew noticed the fifteen holes in the aircraft, and Gable noticed his boot. Brushing off concern with reporters, Gable claimed, "I didn't know it had happened. I didn't know anything about it until we had dropped eleven thousand feet, and could get off oxygen and look around. Only then did I see the hole in the turret."

5) Gable's final combat mission was an early morning strike to the port area of Nantes, France, on 23 September 1943. He flew with Lt. Col. Burns and 510th Bomb Squadron commander Maj. John Blaylock, leading the 351st in The Dutchess (42-29925). Half of the six groups assigned failed to assemble in bad weather, and intercepting fighters inflicted extensive battle damage to the other half, but no bombers were lost. Gable left his film crew in the waist of the bomber and manned a gun in the nose.

Captain Clark Gable was awarded the Air Medal on 4 October for completing five combat missions, and later the Distinguished Flying Cross. His final three missions were flown in the dangerous position of group lead, a hazard emphasized when the B-17 flown by Col. Hatcher and Major Blaylock was shot down near Cognac, France, on 31 December 1943, killing Blaylock and resulting in Hatcher's capture. Gable left the 351st on 5 November 1943, returning to the US with over 50,000 feet of 16mm colour film. In 1944, the film Combat America, narrated by Gable, was shown in theatres.

Many of the men he served with, such as former Tech. Sgt. Ralph Cowley, said Gable actually unofficially joined other missions and the above 5 were only a fraction of the total.

=== Back to Royal Air Force control ===
Post-war the station came under No. 273 Maintenance Unit RAF and the airfield was kept in usable state until October 1948 when it was closed. RAF Polebrook was kept in caretaker status until 1959.

The Thor missile deployment was an emergency response by the US to what was perceived as a missile gap with the Soviet Union. Launch orders for Thor missiles were to be given jointly by UK-US officers from HQ Bomber Command, High Wycombe and USAF 7th Air Division, co-located at the same base. An RAF officer could order a missile to be launched, but a USAF officer had to authenticate arming the warhead. The W49 thermonuclear warhead fitted to a Thor missile had a destructive yield of 1.44 megatons, and weighed 1680 lbs. The missile itself had a CEP of approximately two miles.

No. 130(SM) Squadron (North Luffenham Wing) was formed at what was retained for RAF use at Polebrook to operate three Thor missile emplacements which were constructed in the centre of the former airfield area.

The Thor missiles were operational until August 1963, when the rockets were removed and the unit disbanded.

== Current use ==
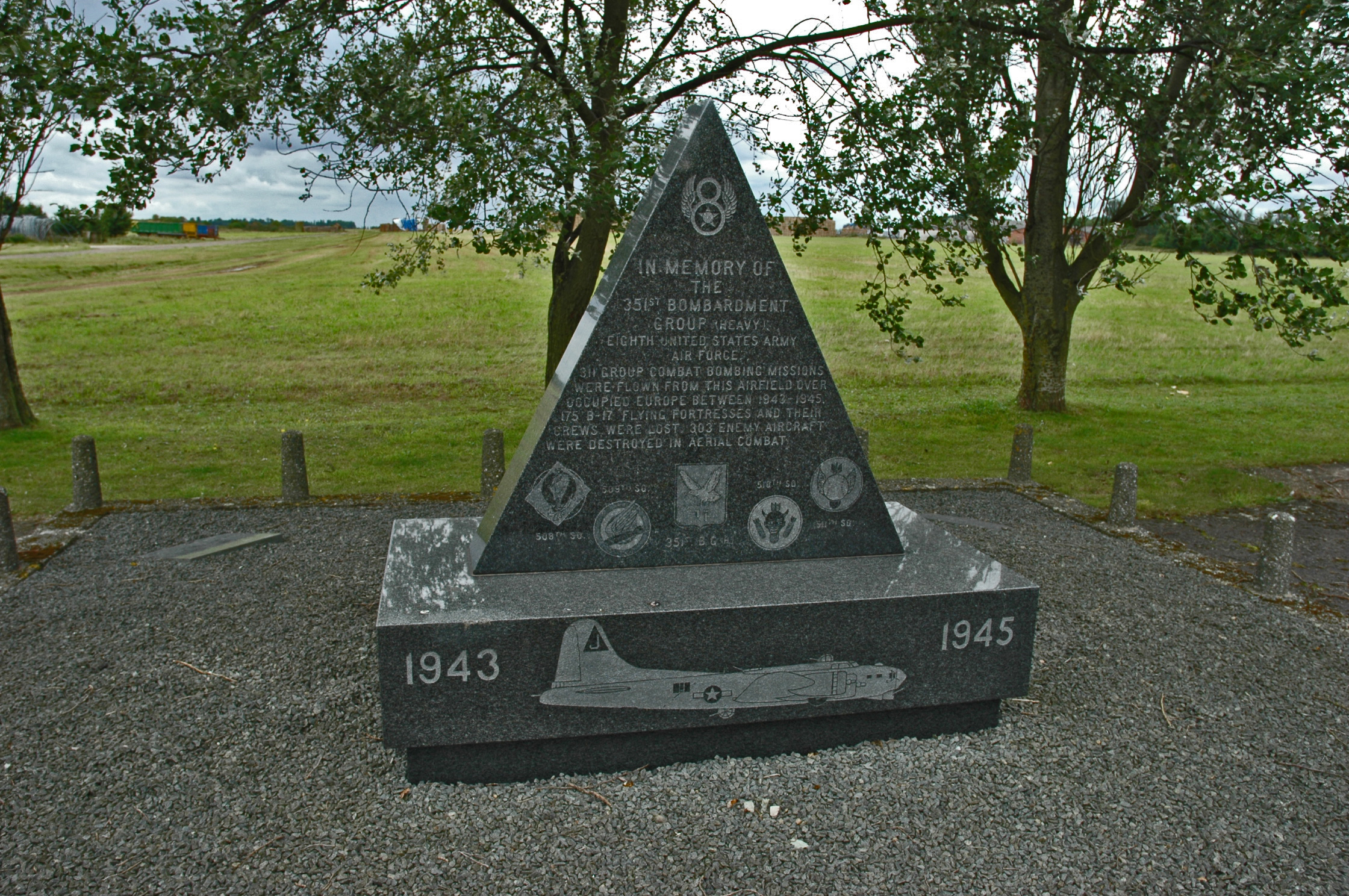
351st Bomb Group Memorial

With the end of military control, the remnants of RAF Polebrook were sold back to the Rothschild estate in 1967. During the next decade, the St Ives Sand and Gravel company broke up and removed all the concrete from the airfield's runways, taxiways and aprons; only the ends of runways 02 and 32 were not removed.

Only a few reminders of Polebrook's wartime past are still identifiable. All of the wartime concreted areas have been removed with the exception of the deteriorating Thor missile launch pads from the early 1960s. A memorial was erected in early 1981 and some old buildings remain scattered around in the area being used for agricultural purposes. The large J-Type hangar still exists and the owners are very American friendly and very respectful of the hangar's place in history.

== See also ==
- List of former Royal Air Force stations
