= 94th Combat Bombardment Wing =

94th Bombardment Wing
- Active: 1943 - 1945
- Country: United States
- Branch: United States Army Air Forces
- Role: Bombardment (Command & Control)
- Part of: Eighth Air Force

The 94th Bombardment Wing was a unit of the United States Army Air Forces. Its last assignment was with the Eighth Air Force, 1st Air Division, based at RAF Polebrook, England. It was inactivated on 18 June 1945.

Command and control organization for VIII Bomber Command. Had no groups until April 1944. Flew in combat in the European theater from 2 June until 14 August 1944 when its groups were reassigned.

== Lineage ==
- Constituted as 94th Bombardment Wing (Heavy) on 2 November 1943

Activated on 12 December 1943
Redesignated 94th Combat Bombardment Wing (Heavy) in August 1943
Disbanded on 18 June 1945.

== Assignments ==
- VIII Bomber Command, 12 December 1943
- 1st Bombardment (later, 1 Air) Division, 22 February 1944 – 18 June 1945

== Units assigned ==
- 351st Bombardment Group, 15 December 1943 – 23 June 1945
- 401st Bombardment Group, 8 January 1944 – 20 June 1945
- 457th Bombardment Group, 21 January 1944 – 21 June 1945
- 410th Bombardment Squadron, February 1943 - December 1945

== Stations ==
- RAF Polebrook, England, 12 December 1943
- RAF Alconbury, England, 12-18 June 1945
