= 510th Missile Squadron =

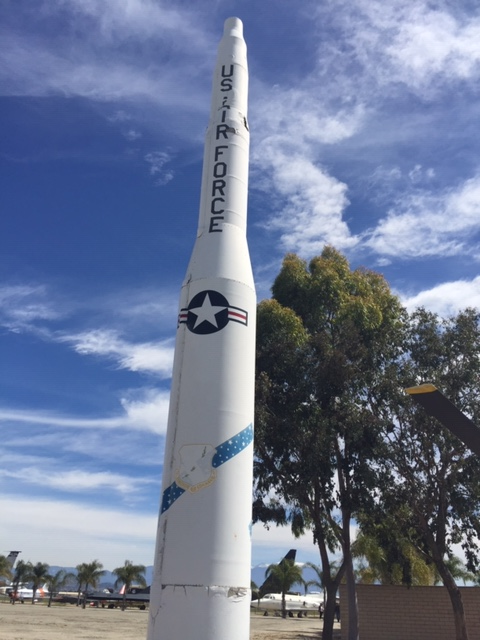
- LGM-30F Minuteman II
- Active: 1942–1945; 1947–1949; 1963–1993
- Country: United States
- Branch: United States Air Force
- Role: Intercontinental ballistic missile
- Engagements: European Theater of Operations
- Decorations: Distinguished Unit Citation; Air Force Outstanding Unit Award

Insignia
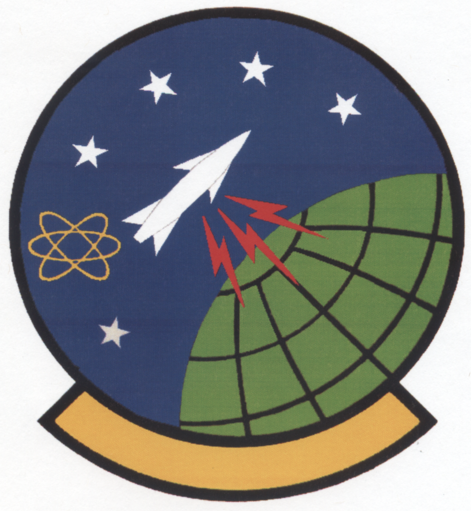
- 510th Missile Squadron emblem (Note: Approved 20 April 1976. Description: A blue disc edged with a narrow black border on which is a green demi-globe issuing from sinister base with axis bendwise grid-lined black below an arced pattern of five white five-pointed stars and a yellow atomic symbol, above the globe a stylized white missile ascending bend sinisterwise emitting three red lightning flashes surmounting the upper portion of the globe. Attached below the disc a blank yellow scroll edged black. Significance: The missile represents the unit's function, and the atomic symbol its nuclear technology. The three lightning bolts symbolize the missile's speed, power, and strike capability, and the grid and sky are emblematic of the unit's global capability. The five stars represent the unit's World War II participation in five campaigns.)

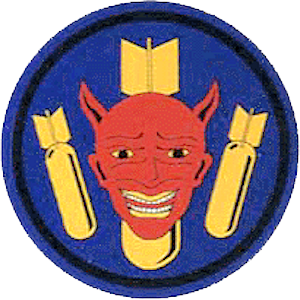
- 510th Bombardment Squadron emblem (Note: Approved 9 December 1943. Description: On an ultramarine blue disc, border ultramarine blue, piped black, three yellow aerial bombs, one to dexter, one to sinister, pointing to center base point, larger one in center in pale, surmounted by the head and face of a grinning red devil affronte, trimmed black and yellow.)
- World War II fuselage code: TU

The 510th Missile Squadron is an inactive United States Air Force unit. It was last assigned to the 351st Operations Group at Whiteman Air Force Base, Missouri. The squadron was equipped with the LGM-30F Minuteman II Intercontinental ballistic missile with a mission of nuclear deterrence. With the end of the Cold War, the 510th was inactivated on 15 November 1993.

The squadron was first activated during World War II as the 510th Bombardment Squadron, a Boeing B-17 Flying Fortress heavy bomber unit. After training in the United States, it deployed to the European Theater of Operations, where it participated in the strategic bombing campaign against Germany. It earned two Distinguished Unit Citations for its combat actions and two squadron members were awarded the Medal of Honor. Following V-E Day, the squadron returned to the United States, where it was inactivated in August 1945.

From 1947 to 1949, the squadron was active as a reserve unit, but does not appear to have been fully manned or equipped. It remained inactive until 1963, when it was activated at Whiteman as the 510th Strategic Missile Squadron. The squadron was unique, as it controlled Program 494L the Emergency Rocket Communication System.

== History ==
=== World War II ===
The squadron was first activated as the 510th Bombardment Squadron at Salt Lake City Army Air Base, Utah on 1 October 1942 and was one of the four original squadrons of the 351st Bombardment Group. Its cadre moved the same day to Gowen Field, Idaho, where it could begin manning as a heavy bomber unit. The squadron moved to Geiger Field, Washington in November and began training for combat with the Boeing B-17 Flying Fortress. The squadron completed its training in April 1943 and departed for the European Theater of Operations. The air echelon began ferrying its B-17s about 1 April, while the ground echelon left for the New York Port of Embarkation on 12 April.

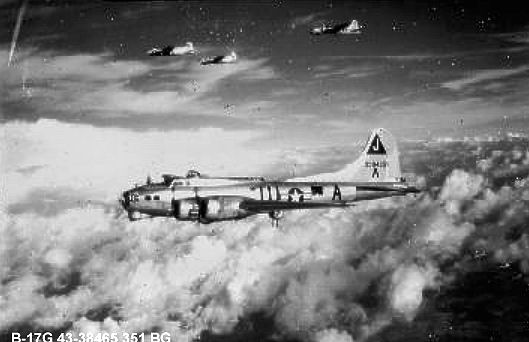
510th Squadron B-17G Flying Fortress (Note: Aircraft is Boeing B-17G-85-BO Flying Fortress, serial 43-38465. This aircraft survived the war and returned to the US on 8 June 1945.)

The ground and air echelons had arrived at the unit's combat station, RAF Polebrook, England by 12 May 1943, and the squadron flew its first mission on 14 May. The squadron primarily flew strategic bombing missions against Germany. It struck targets including ball bearing factories at Schweinfurt; bridges near Köln; oil refineries at Hamburg; communications targets near Mayen; marshalling yards at Koblenz and industrial targets at Berlin, Hannover, and Mannheim. Other targets in France Belgium, the Netherlands and Norway included airfields, harbor installations, and submarine pens.

On 9 October 1943, the squadron attacked the Arado Flugzeugwerke aircraft factory Anklam, Germany. Despite heavy flak and attacks by enemy fighters, accurate bombing inflicted heavy damage on the target. The squadron was awarded its first Distinguished Unit Citation (DUC) for this action. On 11 January 1944, as Operation Pointblank continued, it attacked the heavily defended Focke-Wulf Fw 190 production facility at Oschersleben, without fighter escort and in the face of the strongest fighter opposition encountered for five months, for which it earned a second DUC. It continued attacks on German aircraft production during Big Week, the concentrated attack by VIII Bomber Command against the German aircraft industry in late February.

The squadron was occasionally withdrawn from strategic missions to provide air support and interdiction. In the buildup to Operation Overlord, the invasion at Normandy, the squadron participated in Operation Crossbow, attacking V-1 flying bomb and V-2 rocket launch sites. In June 1944, it provided support for the landings, and the following month supported Operation Cobra, the breakout at Saint Lo. In September, it supported Operation Market Garden, an unsuccessful airborne attack attempting to obtain a bridgehead across the Rhine at Arnhem. From December 1944 through January 1945, it attacked front line positions during the Battle of the Bulge. In March 1945, it flew missions to support Operation Varsity, the airborne assault across the Rhine in Germany.

Following V-E Day, the squadron left England, with the first plane being flown back by its crew departing on 21 May 1945. The ground echelon sailed on the RMS Queen Elizabeth in June 1945. It briefly assembled at Sioux Falls Army Air Field, South Dakota, and was inactivated there on 28 August 1945.

==== Medal of Honor ====
Two members of the squadron, Second Lieutenant Walter E. Truemper and Sergeant Archibald Mathies, were awarded the Medal of Honor. During the Big Week attacks, on 20 February 1944, their B-17 received a direct hit by a cannon shell that exploded in the cockpit and killed the copilot and severely wounded the pilot, rendering him unconscious. The plane's bombardier, assuming the plane was out of control and doomed, immediately bailed out. Carl Moore, the top turret gunner and flight engineer, made his way forward and leaned over the pilots' bodies to control the plane and pull it out of a nosedive. He later received the Distinguished Service Cross for his actions. Moore, Truemper, the Navigator, and Mathies, the Ball Turret Gunner, took turns flying the plane as crewmembers removed the pilots. Despite the freezing cold winds blowing through the damaged cockpit, they managed to fly the plane back to England. There, they held the plane steady, while the rest of the crew bailed out over friendly territory. The wounded pilot, however, could not parachute from the damaged Flying Fortress, so Truemper and Mathies decided to try to land the plane despite orders to bail out and save themselves. On their third landing attempt, the plane crashed and they were killed. The crew received two Medals of Honor, one Distinguished Service Cross, one Silver Star, and seven Purple Hearts, which made them the most decorated B-17 crew of the 8th Air Force in World War Two.

=== Air Force reserve ===
The squadron was activated again in September 1947 in the reserves and trained at Wold Chamberlain Field under the supervision of Air Defense Command (ADC)'s 137th AAF Base Unit (later the 2465th Air Force Reserve Training Center), although its headquarters, the 351st Bombardment Group, was stationed at Scott Field, Illinois. The following year Continental Air Command assumed responsibility for managing reserve units from ADC, and the squadron was reassigned to the 381st Bombardment Group at Offutt Air Force Base, Nebraska.

Although nominally a very heavy bomber unit, it is not clear whether or not the squadron was fully staffed or equipped. President Truman's reduced 1949 defense budget required reductions in the number of units in the Air Force, and the 510th was inactivated and most of its personnel transferred to elements of the 440th Troop Carrier Wing at Wold Chamberlain.

=== Intercontinental Ballistic Missile Squadron ===
The squadron was redesignated the 510th Strategic Missile Squadron in 1962 and organized at Whiteman Air Force Base, Missouri in July 1963 as a Strategic Air Command (SAC) intercontinental ballistic missile squadron, assigned to the 351st Strategic Missile Wing. The wing's first LGM-30B Minuteman I, however did not arrive for emplacement in its silo until 14 January 1964. The squadron became combat ready on 28 June 1964, and began standing alert with a complement of 50 missiles.

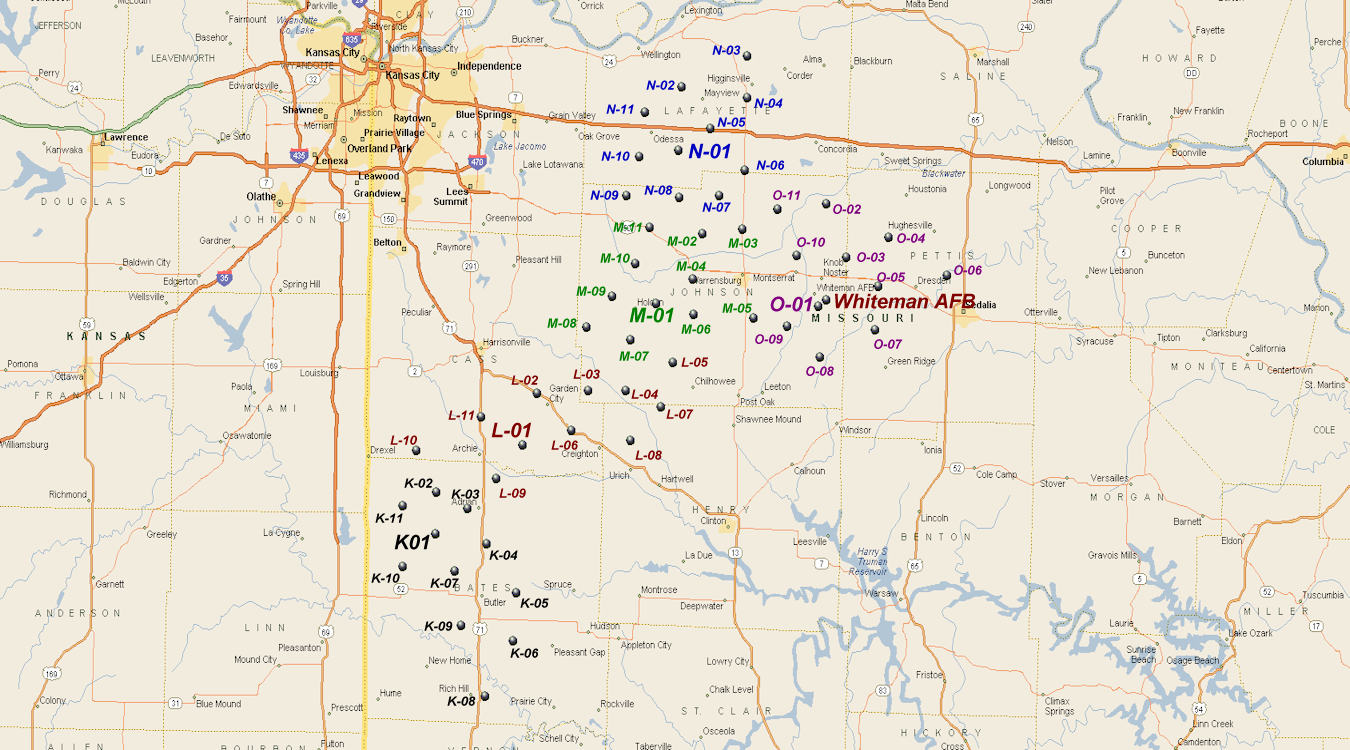
LGM-30 Minuteman Missile Alert and Launch Facilities

510th Missile Squadron Launch Facilities (K-O flights, each controlling 10 missiles) were located as follows:

F-01 6.0 mi SW of Windsor, MO 38°48′00″N 093°43′33″W
I-01 7.3 mi N of Clinton, MO 38°28′49″N 093°44′57″W
M-01 32.6 mi NE of Holden, MO 38°43′30″N 093°56′40″W
N-01 3.9 mi SE of Odessa, MO 38°58′14″N 093°53′32″W
O-01 on Whiteman AFB, MO (Note: Preserved, but not open to the public.) 38°43′14″N 093°33′56″W

Beginning in May 1966, the squadron began an upgrade to LGM-30F Minuteman II missiles. The conversion to the newer model of the Minuteman was completed in October 1967. The new missile had greater range and accuracy, along with the ability to employ penetration aids to reduce the effectiveness of anti-ballistic missile defenses and also had more resistance to nuclear blasts. Concurrent with the change to the Minuteman II, the squadron assumed the Emergency Rocket Communications System (ERCS) mission, with the first missile dedicated to this mission going on alert on 10 October 1967. ERCS made sure that national and military leaders could send pre-recorded attack orders to SAC bombers and missiles if land-based and airborne command and control systems were destroyed. Each ERCS missile had two UHF transmitters and was to be launched at a very high trajectory to send nuclear orders or "go codes" to bombers in flight and ground-based nuclear forces in its line of sight for up to 30 minutes. Ultimately, twelve of the squadron's silos contained missiles with ERCS transmitters aboard.

In September 1991, the squadron was renamed the 510th Missile Squadron as the Air Force removed the distinction between "tactical" and "strategic" in unit names prior to the combination of SAC and Tactical Air Command into a single Air Combat Command. In the 1990s, President Bush's decided to stand down Minuteman II units. Shutdown of ERCS began in November 1991, and the squadron was inactivated on 15 November 1993.

== Lineage ==
- Constituted as the 510th Bombardment Squadron (Heavy) on 25 September 1942

Activated on 1 October 1942
Redesignated 510th Bombardment Squadron, Heavy c. 11 August 1944
Inactivated on 28 August 1945

- Redesignated 510th Bombardment Squadron, Very Heavy on 25 August 1947

Activated in the reserve on 15 September 1947
Inactivated on 27 June 1949

- Redesignated 510th Strategic Missile Squadron (ICBM-Minuteman) on 15 November 1962 and activated (not organized)

Organized on 1 July 1963
Redesignated 510th Missile Squadron on 1 September 1991
Inactivated on 15 November 1993

=== Assignments ===
- 351st Bombardment Group, 1 October 1942 – 28 August 1945
- 351st Bombardment Group, 15 October 1947
- 381st Bombardment Group, 3 May 1948 – 27 June 1949
- Strategic Air Command, 15 November 1962 (not organized)
- 351st Strategic Missile Wing, 1 July 1963
- 351st Operations Group, 1 September 1991 – 15 November 1993

=== Stations ===
- Salt Lake City Army Air Base, Utah, 1 October 1942
- Gowen Field, Idaho, 1 October 1942
- Geiger Field, Washington, November 1942
- Biggs Field, Texas, 2 January 1943
- Pueblo Army Air Base, Colorado, 2 March-12 April 1943
- RAF Polebrook (AAF-110), England, 12 May 1943 – 9 June 1945
- Sioux Falls Army Air Field, South Dakota, July–28 August 1945
- Wold-Chamberlain Field, Minnesota, 15 September 1947 – 27 June 1949
- Whiteman Air Force Base, Missouri, 1 July 1963 – 15 November 1993

=== Aircraft and missiles ===
- Boeing B-17 Flying Fortress, 1942–1945
- LGM-30B Minuteman I, 1963–1967
- LGM-30F Minuteman II, 1966–1995

=== Awards and campaigns ===
Award streamer	Award	Dates	Notes
	Distinguished Unit Citation	9 October 1943	Germany, 510th Bombardment Squadron
	Distinguished Unit Citation	11 January 1944	Germany, 510th Bombardment Squadron
	Air Force Outstanding Unit Award	1 July 1965-30 June 1966	510th Strategic Missile Squadron
	Air Force Outstanding Unit Award	1 July 1967-30 June 1968	510th Strategic Missile Squadron
	Air Force Outstanding Unit Award	1 July 1969-30 June 1971	510th Strategic Missile Squadron
	Air Force Outstanding Unit Award	1 July 1973-30 June 1974	510th Strategic Missile Squadron
	Air Force Outstanding Unit Award	1 July 1980-30 June 1982	510th Strategic Missile Squadron
	Air Force Outstanding Unit Award	1 July 1986-30 June 1987	510th Strategic Missile Squadron
	Air Force Outstanding Unit Award	1 July 1991-30 June 1993	510th Missile Squadron

Campaign Streamer	Campaign	Dates	Notes
	Air Offensive, Europe	12 May 1943 – 5 June 1944	510th Bombardment Squadron
	Air Combat, EAME Theater	12 May 1943 – 11 May 1945	510th Bombardment Squadron
	Normandy	6 June 1944 – 24 July 1944	510th Bombardment Squadron
	Northern France	25 July 1944 – 14 September 1944	510th Bombardment Squadron
	Rhineland	15 September 1944 – 21 March 1945	510th Bombardment Squadron
	Ardennes-Alsace	16 December 1944 – 25 January 1945	510th Bombardment Squadron
	Central Europe	22 March 1944 – 21 May 1945	510th Bombardment Squadron

== See also ==
- List of United States Air Force missile squadrons
- Post Attack Command and Control System
- Emergency Rocket Communications System
- B-17 Flying Fortress units of the United States Army Air Forces
