= Strategic Arms Reduction Treaty =

Strategic Arms Reduction Treaty (START) may refer to:

- START I, signed on July 31, 1991
- START II, signed January 3, 1993
- START III, never signed
- New START, signed on April 8, 2010
