= 351st Operations Group =

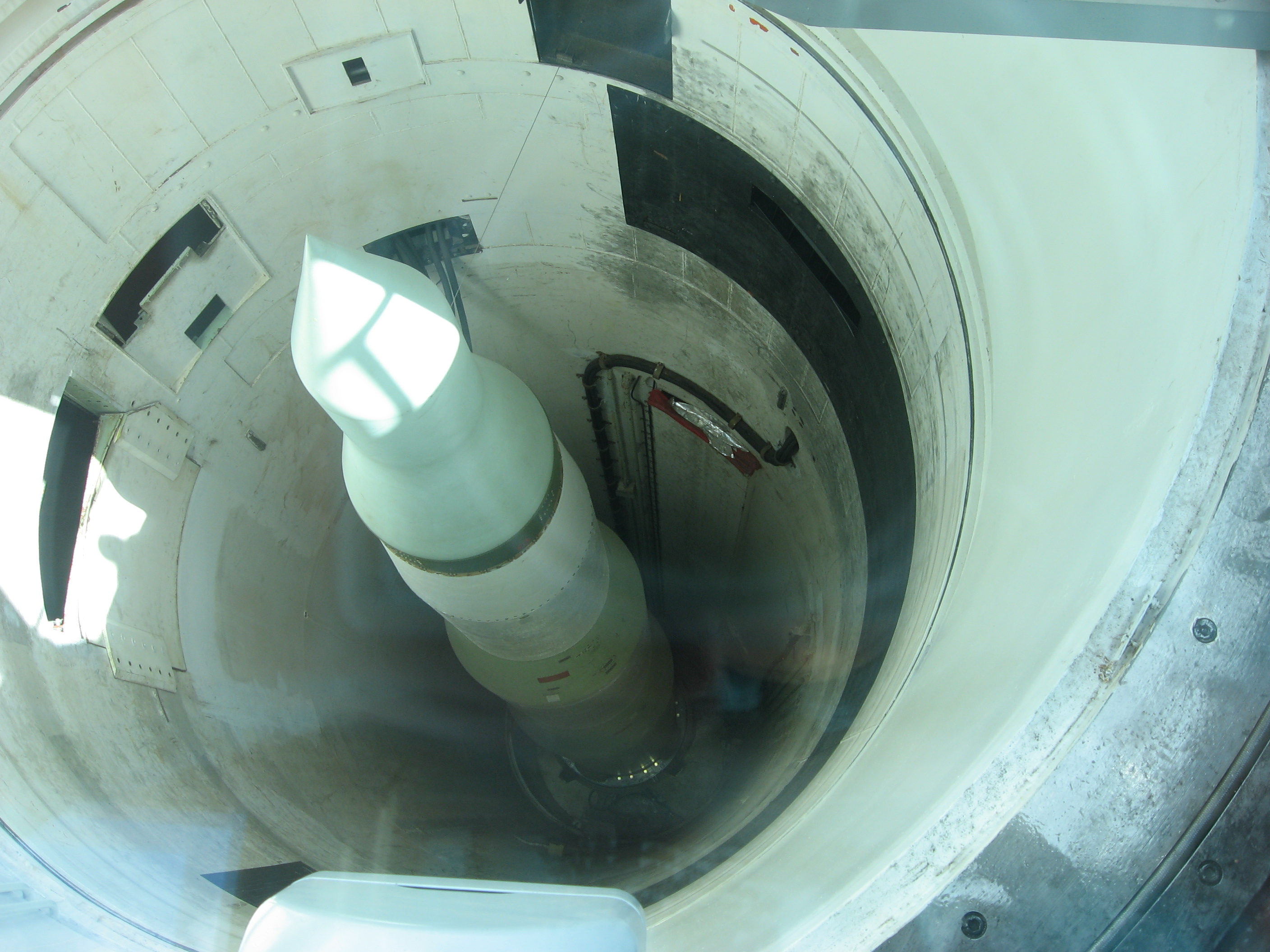
- Minuteman Missile in its silo
- Active: 1991–1995
- Country: United States
- Branch: United States Air Force
- Role: Strategic Missile

Insignia
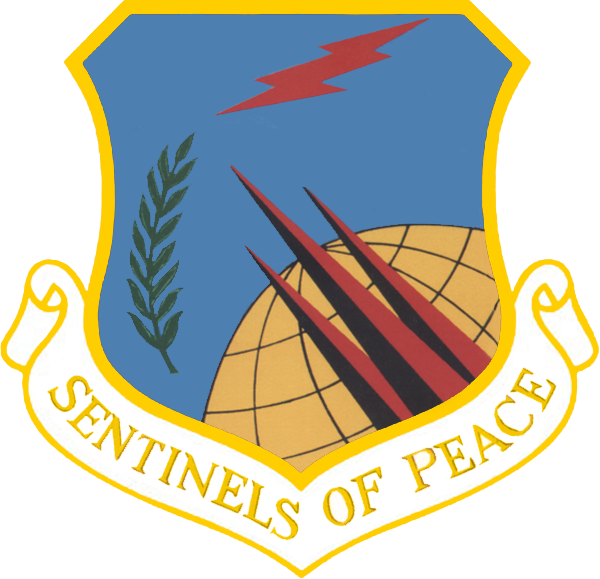
- 351st Operations Group emblem

The 351st Operations Group is an inactive unit of the United States Air Force. Its last assignment was with the 351st Missile Wing at Whiteman Air Force Base, Missouri. It was inactivated on 31 July 1995.

== History ==
For additional history and lineage, see 351st Missile Wing

=== Strategic Missiles ===
Activated as the 351st Operations Group on 1 September 1991 under the Objective Wing concept adapted by the Air Force. The ICBM squadrons of the renamed 351st Missile Wing were reassigned to the newly established group.

On 28 September 1991, in response to President Bush's directive to stand down the Minuteman II, personnel of the 351 OG began to dissipate launch codes and pin safety control switches at launch control centers.

On 1 June 1992, the 351 OG was relieved of its emergency war order mission and its primary focus was deactivation of the Minuteman II weapon system. This day also marked the end of SAC and the beginning of Air Combat Command (ACC).

On 1 July 1993 its parent unit, the 351 MW changed hands from ACC to Air Force Space Command along with all other ICBM wings. The 508th, 509th and 510th Missile Squadrons were inactivated along with the 351st Operations Group on 31 July 1995.

=== Lineage ===
- Constituted as the 351st Operations Group on 29 August 1991
- Activated on 1 September 1991

Inactivated on 31 July 1995

=== Assignments ===
- 351st Missile Wing, 1 September 1991 – 31 July 1995

=== Components ===
- 351st Operations Support Squadron, 1 September 1991 – 31 July 1995
- 508th Missile Squadron, 1 September 1991 – 31 July 1995
- 509th Missile Squadron, 1 September 1991 – 31 July 1995
- 510th Missile Squadron, 1 September 1991 – 31 July 1995

=== Stations ===
- Whiteman Air Force Base, Missouri, 1 September 1991 – 31 July 1995

=== Aircraft and missiles ===
- LGM-30F Minuteman II, 1991–1995
