= 508th Missile Squadron =

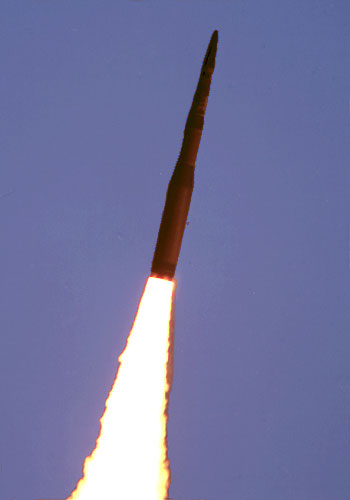
- LGM-30F Minuteman II test launch at Vandenberg AFB
- Active: 1942–1945; 1947–1949; 1962–1995
- Country: United States
- Branch: United States Air Force
- Role: Intercontinental ballistic missile
- Engagements: European Theater of Operations
- Decorations: Distinguished Unit Citation; Air Force Outstanding Unit Award

Insignia
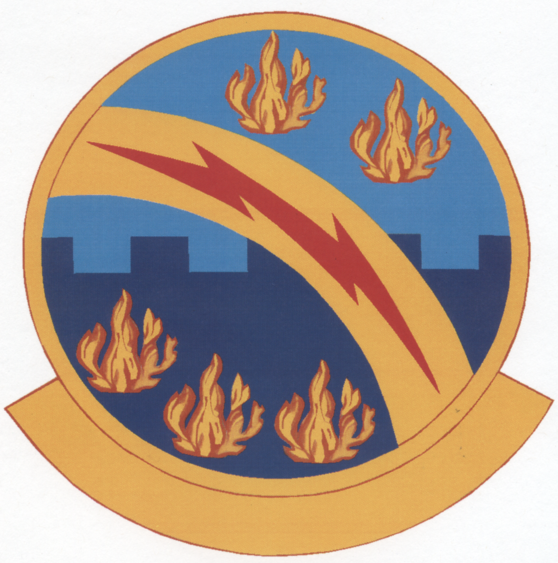
- 508th Strategic Missile Squadron emblem (Note: Approved 19 December 1967. Description: A disc with a narrow gold bordure above a gold scroll, the disc blazoned as follows: Per fess embattled Azure (Celestial) and Azure (ultramarine), on a bend arched Or between five flames two and three proper, a lightning flash Gules. Significance: The lightning on the arched band refers to the squadron's function of missile operations. The embattled partition line and the flames stand for the air offensive over Europe in World War II. The flames allude to participation in five campaigns. The light shade of blue used by the Strategic Air Command indicates the squadron serves under that organization. Also the light blue, representing the daylight sky, refers to the pioneering of daylight precision bombing of strategic enemy targets during the air offensive over Europe.)

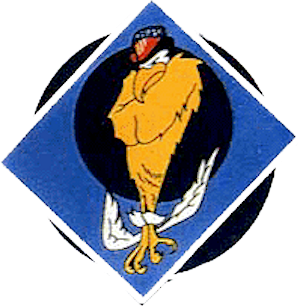
- 508th Bombardment Squadron emblem
- World War II fuselage code: YB

The 508th Missile Squadron is an inactive United States Air Force unit. It was last assigned to the 351st Operations Group at Whiteman Air Force Base, Missouri. The squadron was equipped with the LGM-30F Minuteman II Intercontinental ballistic missile with a mission of nuclear deterrence. With the end of the Cold War, the 508th was inactivated on 28 July 1995.

The squadron was first activated during World War II as the 508th Bombardment Squadron, a Boeing B-17 Flying Fortress heavy bomber unit. After training in the United States, it deployed to the European Theater of Operations, where it participated in the strategic bombing campaign against Germany. It earned two Distinguished Unit Citations for its combat actions. Following V-E Day, the squadron returned to the United States, where it was inactivated in August 1945.

From 1947 to 1949, the squadron was active as a reserve unit, but does not appear to have been fully manned or equipped. It remained inactive until 1963, when it was activated at Whiteman as the 508th Strategic Missile Squadron.

== History ==
=== World War II ===
The squadron was first activated as the 508th Bombardment Squadron at Salt Lake City Army Air Base, Utah on 1 October 1942 as one of the four original squadrons of the 351st Bombardment Group. Its cadre moved the same day to Gowen Field, Idaho, where it could begin manning as a heavy bomber unit. The squadron moved to Geiger Field, Washington in November and began training for combat with the Boeing B-17 Flying Fortress. The squadron completed its training in April 1943 and departed for the European Theater of Operations. The air echelon began ferrying its B-17s about 1 April, while the ground echelon left for the New York Port of Embarkation on 12 April.

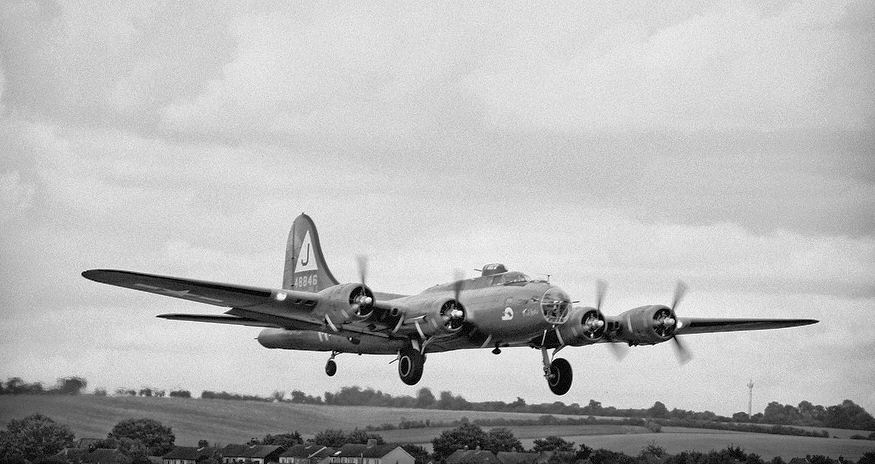
351st Group B-17 landing at Polebrook (Note: Aircraft is Boeing B-17G-95-BO Flying Fortress, serial 43-38846. This plane survived the war and returned to the United States, where it was stored at Walnut Ridge Army Air Field on 9 January 1946. It was sold for scrap in September 1946. Baugher, Joe (10 April 2023). "1943 USAF Serial Numbers". Joe Baugher.)

The ground and air echelons had arrived at the unit's combat station, RAF Polebrook, England by 12 May 1943, and the squadron flew its first mission on 14 May. The squadron primarily flew strategic bombing missions against Germany. It struck targets including ball bearing factories at Schweinfurt; bridges near Köln; oil refineries at Hamburg; communications targets near Mayen; marshalling yards at Koblenz and industrial targets at Berlin, Hannover, and Mannheim. Other targets in France Belgium, the Netherlands and Norway included airfields, harbor installations, and submarine pens.

On 9 October 1943, the squadron attacked the Arado Flugzeugwerke aircraft factory Anklam, Germany. Despite heavy flak and attacks by enemy fighters, accurate bombing inflicted heavy damage on the target. The squadron was awarded its first Distinguished Unit Citation (DUC) for this action. On 11 January 1944, as Operation Pointblank continued, it attacked the heavily defended Focke-Wulf Fw 190 production facility at Oschersleben, without fighter escort and in the face of the strongest fighter opposition encountered for five months, for which it earned a second DUC. It continued attacks on German aircraft production during Big Week, the concentrated attack by VIII Bomber Command against the German aircraft industry in late February.

The squadron was occasionally withdrawn from strategic missions to provide air support and interdiction. In the buildup to Operation Overlord, the invasion at Normandy, the squadron participated in Operation Crossbow, attacking V-1 flying bomb and V-2 rocket launch sites. In June 1944, it provided support for the landings, and the following month supported Operation Cobra, the breakout at Saint Lo. In September, it supported Operation Market Garden, an unsuccessful airborne attack attempting to obtain a bridgehead across the Rhine at Arnhem. From December 1944 through January 1945, it attacked front line positions during the Battle of the Bulge. In March 1945, it flew missions to support Operation Varsity, the airborne assault across the Rhine in Germany.

Following V-E Day, the squadron left England, with the first plane being flown back by its crew departing on 21 May 1945. The ground echelon sailed on the RMS Queen Elizabeth in June 1945. It briefly assembled at Sioux Falls Army Air Field, South Dakota, and was inactivated there on 28 August 1945.

=== Air Force reserve ===
The squadron was activated again at Scott Field in October 1947 in the reserves and trained under the supervision of Air Defense Command (ADC)'s 139th AAF Base Unit (later the 2469th Air Force Reserve Training Center). The following year Continental Air Command assumed responsibility for managing reserve units from ADC. Although nominally a very heavy bomber unit, it is not clear whether or not the squadron was fully staffed or equipped. President Truman’s reduced 1949 defense budget required reductions in the number of units in the Air Force, and the 508th was inactivated and most of its personnel transferred to elements of the 419th Troop Carrier Wing.

=== Intercontinental ballistic missile squadron ===
The squadron was redesignated the 508th Strategic Missile Squadron in 1962 and organized at Whiteman Air Force Base, Missouri in May 1963 as a Strategic Air Command (SAC) intercontinental ballistic missile squadron, assigned to the 351st Strategic Missile Wing. The wing's first LGM-30B Minuteman I, however did not arrive for emplacement in its silo until 14 January 1964. The squadron became combat ready on 5 June 1964, and began standing alert with a complement of 50 missiles.

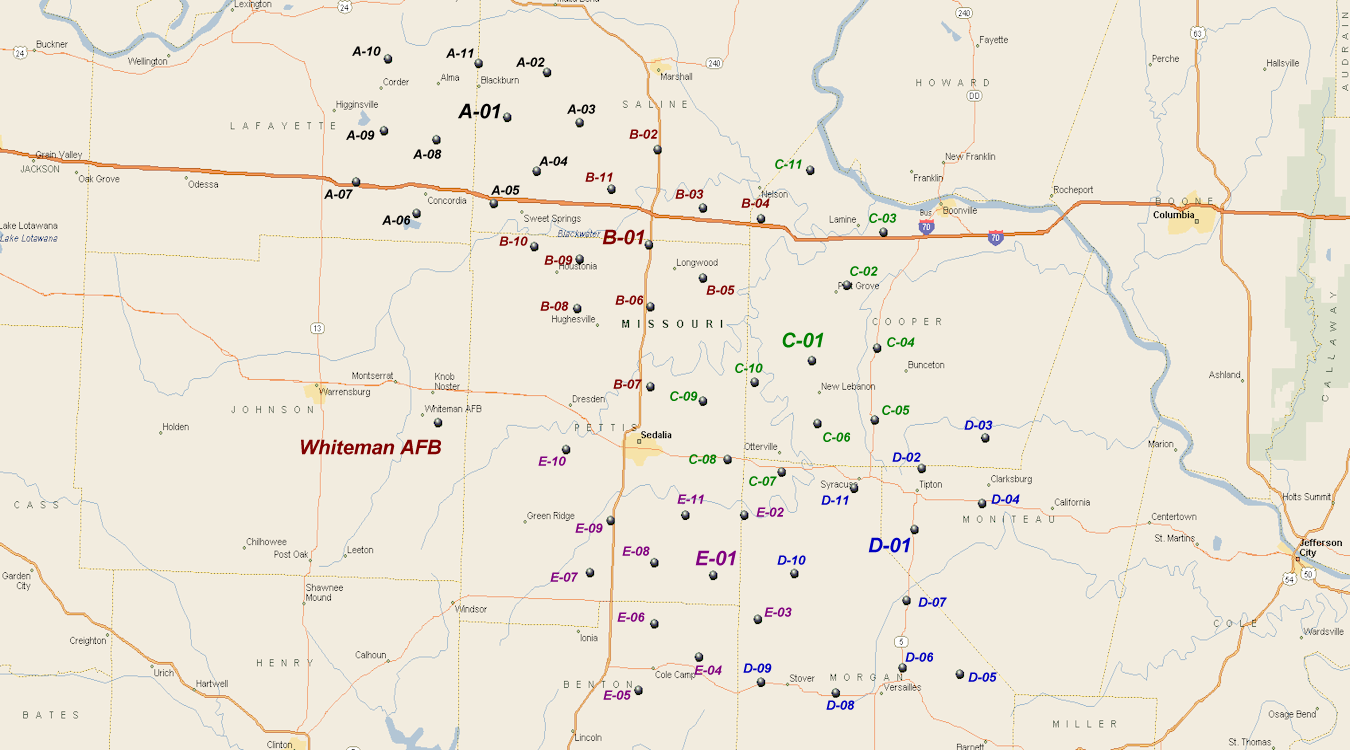

LGM-30 Minuteman Missile Alert and Launch Facilities were located at:

A-01 3.5 mi SE of Blackburn, Missouri 39°04′05″N 093°26′20″W
B-01 38.1 mi ExNE of Houstonia, Missouri 38°55′38″N 093°12′41″W
C-01 5.6 mi SxSW of Pilot Grove, Missouri 38°47′59″N 092°57′05″W
D-01 6.1 mi SE of Syracuse, Missouri 38°36′45″N 092°47′15″W
E-01 7.3 mi WxSW of Florence, Missouri 38°33′46″N 093°06′33″W

Beginning in May 1966, the squadron began an upgrade to LGM-30F Minuteman II missiles. The conversion to the newer model of the Minuteman was completed in October 1967. The new missile had greater range and accuracy, along with the ability to employ penetration aids to reduce the effectiveness of anti-ballistic missile defenses and also had more resistance to nuclear blasts.

In September 1991, the squadron was renamed the 508th Missile Squadron as the Air Force removed the distinction between "tactical" and "strategic" in unit names prior to the combination of SAC and Tactical Air Command into a single Air Combat Command. In the 1990s, President Bush decided to stand down Minuteman II units. The squadron was inactivated on 28 July 1995.

== Lineage ==
- Constituted as the 508th Bombardment Squadron (Heavy) on 25 September 1942

Activated on 1 October 1942
Redesignated 508th Bombardment Squadron, Heavy c. 11 August 1944
Inactivated on 28 August 1945

- Redesignated 508th Bombardment Squadron, Very Heavy on 23 September 1947

Activated in the reserve on 15 October 1947
Inactivated on 27 June 1949

- Redesignated 508th Strategic Missile Squadron (ICBM-Minuteman) and activated on 9 August 1962 (not organized)

Organized on 1 May 1963
Redesignated 508th Missile Squadron on 1 September 1991
Inactivated on 28 July 1995

=== Assignments ===
- 351st Bombardment Group, 1 October 1942 – 28 August 1945
- 351st Bombardment Group, 15 October 1947 – 27 June 1949
- Strategic Air Command, 9 August 1962 (not organized)
- 351st Strategic Missile Wing, 1 May 1963
- 351st Operations Group, 1 September 1991 – 28 July 1995

=== Stations ===
- Salt Lake City Army Air Base, Utah, 1 October 1942
- Gowen Field, Idaho, 1 October 1942
- Geiger Field, Washington, November 1942
- Biggs Field, Texas, 2 January 1943
- Pueblo Army Air Base, Colorado, 2 March–12 April 1943
- RAF Polebrook (AAF-110), England, 12 May 1943 – 9 June 1945
- Sioux Falls Army Air Field, South Dakota, July–28 August 1945
- Scott Field (later Scott Air Force Base), Illinois, 15 October 1947 – 27 June 1949
- Whiteman Air Force Base, Missouri, 1 May 1963 – 28 July 1995

=== Aircraft and missiles ===
- Boeing B-17 Flying Fortress, 1942–1945
- LGM-30B Minuteman I, 1963–1967
- LGM-30F Minuteman II, 1966–1995

=== Awards and campaigns ===
Award streamer	Award	Dates	Notes
	Distinguished Unit Citation	9 October 1943	Germany, 508th Bombardment Squadron
	Distinguished Unit Citation	11 January 1944	Germany, 508th Bombardment Squadron
	Air Force Outstanding Unit Award	1 July 1965-30 June 1966	508th Strategic Missile Squadron
	Air Force Outstanding Unit Award	1 July 1967-30 June 1968	508th Strategic Missile Squadron
	Air Force Outstanding Unit Award	1 July 1969-30 June 1971	508th Strategic Missile Squadron
	Air Force Outstanding Unit Award	1 July 1973-30 June 1974	508th Strategic Missile Squadron
	Air Force Outstanding Unit Award	1 July 1980-30 June 1982	508th Strategic Missile Squadron
	Air Force Outstanding Unit Award	1 July 1986-30 June 1987	508th Strategic Missile Squadron
	Air Force Outstanding Unit Award	1 July 1991-30 June 1993	508th Missile Squadron

Campaign Streamer	Campaign	Dates	Notes
	Air Offensive, Europe	12 May 1943 – 5 June 1944	508th Bombardment Squadron
	Air Combat, EAME Theater	12 May 1943 – 11 May 1945	508th Bombardment Squadron
	Normandy	6 June 1944 – 24 July 1944	508th Bombardment Squadron
	Northern France	25 July 1944 – 14 September 1944	508th Bombardment Squadron
	Rhineland	15 September 1944 – 21 March 1945	508th Bombardment Squadron
	Ardennes-Alsace	16 December 1944 – 25 January 1945	508th Bombardment Squadron
	Central Europe	22 March 1944 – 21 May 1945	508th Bombardment Squadron

== See also ==
- List of United States Air Force missile squadrons
- B-17 Flying Fortress units of the United States Army Air Forces
