= Tansky =

Tansky is a surname. Notable people with the surname include:

- Burton Tansky (1937–2025), American department store executive
- Eva Tansky Blum, American lawyer and civic leader
