= Westinghouse High School (Pittsburgh) =

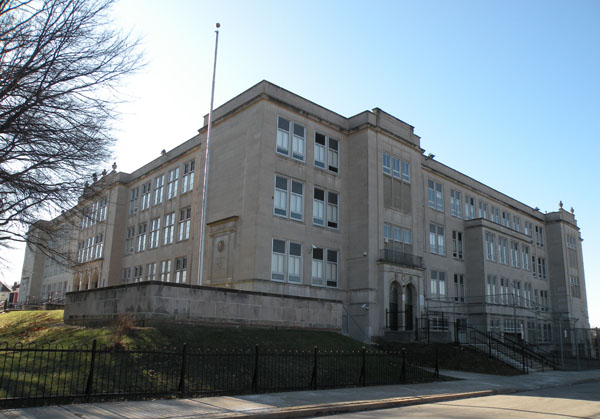

Location
- 1101 North Murtland Street; Pittsburgh, Pennsylvania 15208; United States; 40°27′39″N 79°54′4.36″W

Information
- Funding type: Public
- Established: 1912; 114 years ago
- School district: Pittsburgh Public Schools
- Principal: Stephan Sereda (acting)
- Teaching staff: 60.00 (FTE) (2016–17)
- Grades: 6–12
- Student to teacher ratio: 11.38 (2016–17)
- Colors: Blue and gold
- Mascot: Bulldogs
- Website: Westinghouse High School
- Westinghouse High School
- U.S. National Register of Historic Places
- City of Pittsburgh Historic Structure
- Pittsburgh Landmark – PHLF
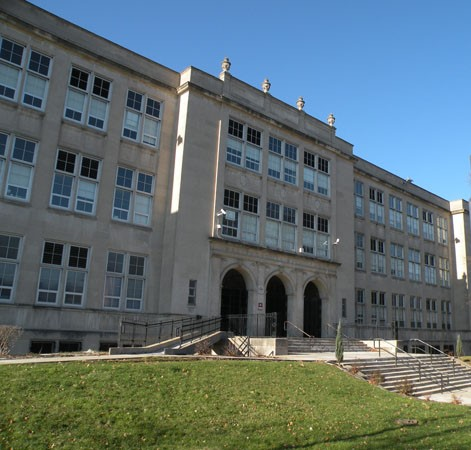
- Front of school
- Architect: Ingham & Boyd
- Architectural style: Classical Revival
- NRHP reference No.: 86002716

Significant dates
- Added to NRHP: September 30, 1986
- Designated CPHS: November 30, 1999
- Designated PHLF: 2001

Westinghouse High School, also known as The Academy at Westinghouse or Westinghouse Academy, is one of 10 high schools and of four 6–12 schools in the Pittsburgh Public Schools. It is located in the Homewood neighborhood of Pittsburgh, Pennsylvania, and is named for Pittsburgh resident and entrepreneur George Westinghouse. As of October 2019, Westinghouse has an enrollment of 697 students, 95% of whom are African American. Westinghouse High School serves East Hills, East Liberty, Highland Park, Homewood North, Homewood South, Homewood West, Larimer, Lincoln-Lemington-Belmar, and Point Breeze North, as well as the nearby town of Wilkinsburg. The school's mascot is a bulldog.

== History ==
=== Early years ===
Westinghouse High School served a diverse population of middle- and working-class individuals who lived in the Homewood neighborhood. To relieve crowding at Peabody High School, the Pittsburgh Board of Public Education opened two new East End high schools in 1912, using Woolslair Elementary in Bloomfield and Baxter Elementary in Homewood as temporary locations while permanent buildings could be constructed. The Woolslair high school became Schenley High, while the Homewood school, initially known as Brushton High School, was named in honor of inventor George Westinghouse in 1915.

The Westinghouse students attended classes on a half-day schedule at Baxter Elementary while the permanent building on Murtland Street was being completed. This arrangement was intended to be temporary but ended up lasting for ten years due to construction difficulties. To speed up construction, the school board let a contract for the foundation of the new school in October, 1915, before plans for the building itself were complete. When bids were received for the school the following year, the board felt they were too high and shelved the project "until normal market conditions return". Work was halted with only some preliminary excavation having been completed.

Westinghouse High graduated its first class of seniors in 1916, continuing to operate without a permanent campus through World War I. In 1921, the school board finally resumed construction on several previously deferred projects, including Westinghouse High, Perry Elementary, and Greenfield Elementary. Costs were still higher than before the war, causing Westinghouse to be the most expensive high school built in the city to date at approximately $2.1 million (equivalent to $38.6 million in 2025). The building was constructed in two phases, initially opening in September 1922, with only the exterior shell and some of the rooms on the ground floor complete. The remainder of the interior was finished in February, 1924, and the building was officially dedicated on May 26, 1925.

Another annex was added in 1932 to give space for the 3,300 pupils that were enrolled at that time. The school employed well-regarded faculty and offered English, mathematics, history, science and technical programs like engine repair for boys and home economics for girls.

=== 1940s and 1950s ===
Midcentury marked a change in the racial makeup of Homewood as more Italian immigrants moved to the neighborhood and their children attended Westinghouse. Furthermore, African Americans made up larger percentages of the students at Westinghouse as White residents began moving to the suburbs. By 1955, African American students made up 53.4% of enrolled students at Westinghouse.

By this time Westinghouse had produced several notable alumni including musicians Billy Strayhorn, Mary Lou Williams, Erroll Garner, and Ahmad Jamal.

=== 1960s ===
White families continued to move to the suburbs during this time which considerably changed the racial makeup of the school. The school's budget was also affected by the changing demographics of the area. Even in this time of great change, many students continued to receive scholarships and other accolades.

=== Recent decades ===
During the 2011–2012 school year, the school absorbed students from the East Liberty neighborhood due to the closure of nearby Peabody High School. Due to increasing violence throughout the city, and the shooting of 15-year-old Westinghouse High School Student Dayvon Vikers, students from Westinghouse High School organized a youth-led protest against violence on April 2, 2022.

In 2022, Westinghouse's undefeated football season came to an end in the PIAA 2A State Championship Game, as the Bulldogs could not prevent the Southern Columbia Tigers from winning their sixth consecutive state title 37–22.

2023 shooting

On February 14, 2023, four students were shot outside the school as students were being dismissed for the day.

== Sports ==
=== Overview ===
Westinghouse high school offers the following sports programs: Football, track and cross country, volleyball, basketball, tennis, wrestling, and baseball.

=== Football ===
Westinghouse High School has a long football sports history. The first championship game was the 1921 season. Westinghouse's football program is notable because it reached 500 total wins by 1996—a feat reached faster than many other high schools. The most recent city league title was won by Westinghouse in 2020 with a score of 36 – 20 vs. Allderdice High School

Westinghouse Football winning championships: 1921–1922, 1927–1928, 1928–1929, 1930–1931, 1934–1935, 1938–1939, 1939–1940, 1941–1942, 1942–1943, 1944–1945, 1945–1946, 1946–1947,1947–1948, 1948–1949, 1949–1950, 1951–1952, 1954–1955, 1955–1956, 1956–1957, 1957–1958, 1958–1959, 1959–1960, 1960–1961, 1961–1962, 1963–1964, 1964–1965, 1965–1966, 1966–1967, 1970–1971, 1981–1982, 1992–1993, 1993–1994, 1995–1996, 1996–1997, 2020–2021

==== Notable players and coaches ====
Notable players who have gone on to play in the NFL include:

Tony Liscio, Art Dremer, Ron Casey, Mark Ellison, Wes Garnett, Jon Henderson, Eugene Harrison, Dave Kalina, Melvin Myricks, Mose Lantz, William Robinson and John Greene.

Notable Westinghouse coaches include Pro Burton, Pete Dimperio and George Webb, all winning over 100 games and multiple championships in their coaching careers.

=== Basketball ===
==== Men ====
The Westinghouse Men's Basketball Team won its first conference championship in the 1918–1919 season. Other championship year include: 1942–1943, 1943–1944, 1947–1948, 1949–1950, 1950–1951, 1951–1952, 1952–1953, 1953–1954, 1971–1972, 1997–1998, 1998–1999, 1999–2000, 2011–2012, 2012–2013.

===== Notable players and referees =====
Notable athletes that came from Westinghouse High School's men's basketball program include Naismith Memorial Basketball Hall of Famer Chuck Cooper, the first African-American player drafted into the NBA; Edward Flemming who was drafted by the Rochester Royals in 1955; Maurice Stokes who played for the Rochester Royals and was the 1956 NBA Rookie of the Year, three-time all star, and Hall of Famer; and Kenneth Hudson, who was the first full-time African American NBA referee.

==== Women ====
The Westinghouse High School women's basketball team won their first conference championship in 1983. The team won 15 straight conference championships from the 1995–1996 season through the 2008–2009 season. Throughout that span they went to 18 title games.

Championship seasons: 1982–1983, 1983–1984, 1988–1989, 1989–1990, 1994–1995, 1995–1996, 1996–1997, 1997–1998, 1998–1999, 1999–2000, 2000–2001, 2001–2002, 2002–2003, 2003–2004, 2004–2005, 2005–2006, 2006–2007, 2007–2008, 2008–2009, 2010–2011, 2011–2012, 2012–2013.

===== Notable players =====
Notable player Shawnice Wilson came out of the Westinghouse High School women's basketball program. She played for the University of Miami and the WNBA.

=== Track and cross country ===
The track team has a history of successful league championships:

Men's Track Championships: 1962–1963, 1963–1964, 1964–1965, 1965–1966, 1966–1967 1968–1969, 1969–1970, 1970–1971

Men's Track Relay Championships: 1957–1958, 1958–1959, 1962–1963, 1963–1964, 1964–1965, 1966–1967, 1967–1968, 1968–1969, 1969–1970, 1970–1971

Women's Track Relay Championships: 1979–1980, 1980–1981, 1981–1982

Cross Country: 1959–1960 season

=== Volleyball ===
Westinghouse High School won its first volleyball championship in 1955 and went on to win 5 state championships in a 6-year period. The team of the 1930s and 40s were very successful in their district.

Historical state championships for the Westinghouse volleyball team include the seasons of 1936–1937, 1937–1938, 1938–1939, 1940–1941.

== Courses and training programs ==
=== Overview ===
At Westinghouse High School there are many Career and Technical Education (CTE) programs including business administration, sports and entertainment, carpentry, cosmetology, culinary arts, emergency response technology, and health careers. All certificate programs give students the opportunity to receive college credit for their work.

=== Business Administration ===
In Business Administration, Sports & Entertainment (B.A.S.E), students learn about marketing and accounting and get certificates in Microsoft Office and OSHA. Students also go on field trips to sports facilities. This program partners with Point Park University.

=== Culinary Arts ===
Culinary arts is a CTE program at Westinghouse High School and Carrick High School. Students in this program are offered the following ServSafe certificates: food manager, food handler, and food allergen. They also can become competent in safety and pollution prevention.

=== Emergency Response Technology (E.R.T.) ===
Students in these courses learn how to apply skills and tech knowledge required to perform duties like law enforcement, emergency medical services, and firefighting.

=== Carpentry ===
Students in carpentry CTE learn to build things like tables and dog houses. Allderdice High School students in the nearby neighborhood of Squirrel Hill in Pittsburgh have the opportunity to come to Westinghouse to participate in these courses. Students in carpentry learn to use hand tools, power tools, blueprint reading, site preparation and layout, footings and foundations, framing, floor construction, wall construction, roof construction, exterior finish, interior finish, estimation, and other skills.

=== Cosmetology ===
The cosmetology program helps students enrolled learn about beauty treatments of the hair, complexion, and hands. These include facials, waxing, eyebrows, nails, haircuts, and hair dying. Students tour salons around Pittsburgh to see how they run their businesses. At the end of the program, and after earning 1250 hours of training, students may earn a Pennsylvania state cosmetology license.

== National Landmark Status ==
Westinghouse High School's building received Historic Landmark Status in 2001. The architectural style of the school is classical revival, and the design firm was Ingham & Boyd.

== Alma Mater ==
"Oh, Westinghouse forever, loyal and true.

Nothing can ever change our love for you.

Rah! Rah! Rah!

Oh, Westinghouse forever we're true to you,

we love our colors of GOLD and BLUE."

== Notable alumni ==
- Tom Casey – Professional football player and Canadian Football Hall of Fame inductee
- Chuck Cooper – First African-American drafted in the NBA
- Frank Cunimondo – Jazz pianist
- Erroll Davis – Education administrator and chancellor, University System of Georgia; businessman
- Anthony M. DeLuca – politician
- Jim Ellis – Swim coach and subject of the feature film Pride
- Chauncey Eskridge – Attorney who represented Martin Luther King Jr. and Muhammad Ali; judge
- Erroll Garner – Jazz pianist and composer
- John Greene – NFL player
- Dayon Hayes – college football defensive end
- Jon Henderson – NFL player
- Dakota Staton – Jazz vocalist
- Ahmad Jamal – Jazz pianist and composer
- Dave Kalina – NFL player
- Mose Lantz – NFL player
- Tony Liscio – NFL player
- Bill Nunn Jr. – Administrator, Pittsburgh Steelers; newspaper editor and sports writer
- Wendell H. Phillips – Member Maryland House of Delegates
- Naomi Sims – Supermodel, businesswoman and author
- Maurice Stokes – NBA player
- Billy Strayhorn – Jazz composer
- Adam Wade – Singer, musician and actor; first African-American game-show host
- Mary Lou Williams – Jazz pianist/composer-arranger
