= Troy Simons =

American basketball player

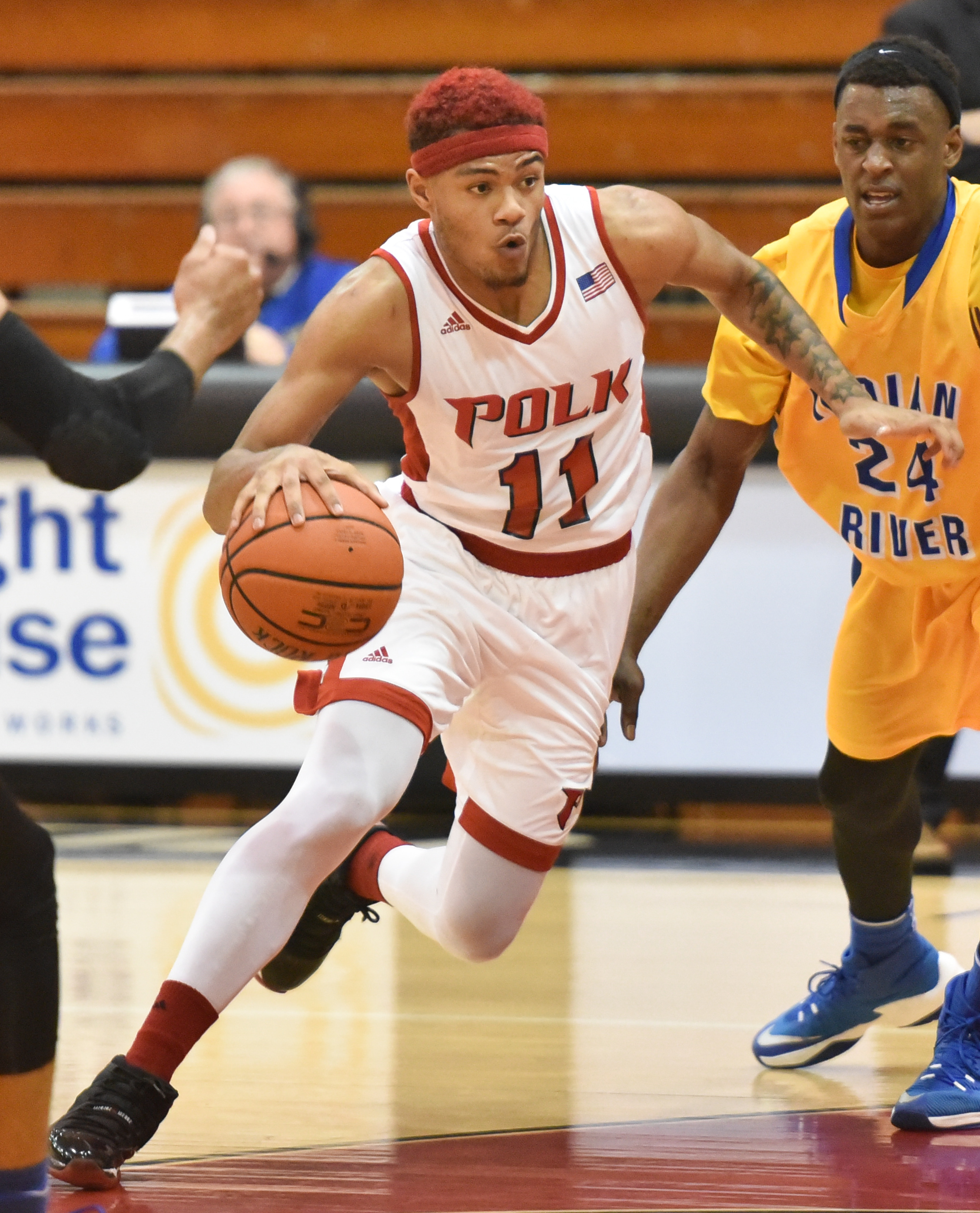
- Simons in 2016

Free agent
- Position: Shooting guard

Personal information
- Born: July 3, 1996 (age 30) Pittsburgh, Pennsylvania, U.S.
- Listed height: 6 ft 3 in (1.91 m)
- Listed weight: 195 lb (88 kg)

Career information
- High school: Brashear (Pittsburgh, Pennsylvania); University Prep (Pittsburgh, Pennsylvania); Imani Christian Academy (Pittsburgh, Pennsylvania); Renaissance Academy (Phoenixville, Pennsylvania)
- College: Polk State (2015–2017); New Mexico (2017–2018); Kent State (2019–2020)
- NBA draft: 2020: undrafted
- Playing career: 2020–present

Career history
- 2020–2021: Tigers Tübingen
- 2021–2022: Kharkivski Sokoly
- 2022–2023: Plymouth City Patriots
- 2023: U.D. Oliveirense
- 2024: Killester

Career highlights
- Super League All-Star Third Team (2024); NJCAA scoring champion (2017)

Troy Simons (born July 3, 1996) is an American professional basketball player. He played college basketball for Polk State College, New Mexico and Kent State.

== Early life and high school career ==
Simons grew up in Pittsburgh and attended four high schools: Brashear, University Prep, Imani Christian Academy, and Renaissance Academy Charter School in Phoenixville, Pennsylvania. He was a two-sport athlete, playing wide receiver on the football team in addition to basketball. Renaissance Academy Charter School closed during the fall of his senior year. When Simons attempted to transfer back to University Prep, he was ruled ineligible and missed his senior season of basketball. He considered attending prep school at Montverde Academy, but instead chose Polk State College after his mentor Rico Abbondanza sent film to coach Matt Furjanic

== College career ==
Simons played two seasons at Polk State. He averaged 17.1 points, 4.4 rebounds, 2.6 assists, and 1.6 steals per game as a freshman. As a sophomore, he led the NJCAA in scoring with 26.3 points per game while also posting 5.5 rebounds and 2.4 assists per game, shooting 41 percent from three-point range. He was named first team All-Suncoast Conference and to the FCSAA/NJCAA Region VIII All-State Team and participated in the 2017 NJCAA Men's Basketball Coaches Association All-Star Game. Simons initially committed to Middle Tennessee State before his sophomore season before de-committing and signed with Pittsburgh in March 2017 over offers from Iowa State and Cincinnati. Due to a communication issue, he changed his commitment to New Mexico.

Simons scored a season-high 24 points on November 14, 2017, in a 103–71 win against Omaha. On January 5, 2018, he was issued a one-game suspension by the Mountain West Conference after receiving a technical foul and ejected against Boise State. As a junior, Simons averaged 9.9 points, 3.1 rebounds and 1.4 assists per game and led the Lobos with 52 steals. After the season, Simons transferred to Kent State. He posted a season-high 27 points on February 15, 2020, in an 87–72 win against Ohio. Simons averaged 12.8 points and 3.5 rebounds per game as a senior, shooting 39 percent from three-point range.

== Professional career ==
On September 11, 2020, Simons signed his first professional contract with Tigers Tübingen of the ProA. He averaged 11.3 points per game as a rookie.

For the 2021–22 season, Simons joined Kharkivski Sokoly of the Ukrainian Basketball SuperLeague. In February 2022, he left Ukraine and joined the Plymouth City Patriots of the British Basketball League.

Simons re-joined the Plymouth City Patriots for the 2022–23 season, but left the team in January 2023 to play out the season with U.D. Oliveirense of the Portuguese League.

In January 2024, Simons joined Killester of the Irish Super League. He helped the team reach the Super League final in April 2024 and was named to the All-Star Third Team. He averaged 21 points per game.
