= Pittsburgh Public Schools =

School district in Pittsburgh, Pennsylvania

Location
- Pittsburgh, Pennsylvania United States

District information
- Type: Public school
- Motto: Expect Great Things
- Grades: Pre-K–12
- Established: 1835
- Superintendent: Wayne Walters
- Asst. superintendent(s): Nina Sacco, Monica Lamar, Rodney Necciai, Shawn McNeil, Patti Camper, Melissa Pearlman
- School board: Gene Walker
- Governing agency: Board of Public Education
- Budget: $668.3 million

Students and staff
- Students: 20,350
- Athletic conference: PIAA District 8

Other information
- Website: Pittsburgh Public Schools

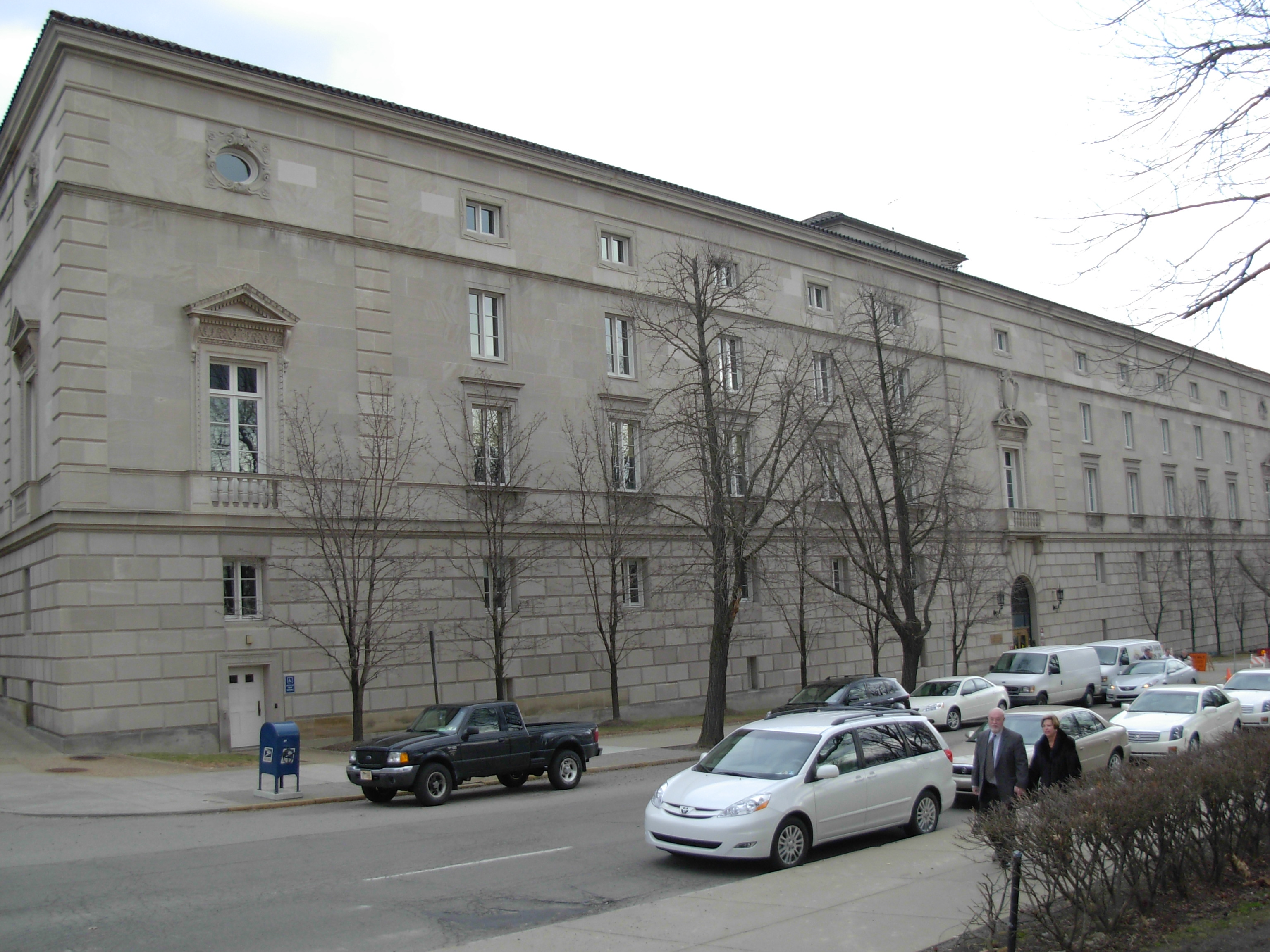
Board of Education's Administration Building in Oakland

Pittsburgh Public Schools is the public school district serving the city of Pittsburgh and adjacent Mount Oliver, Pennsylvania. As of the 2021–2022 school year, the district operates 54 schools with 4,192 employees (2,070 teachers) and 20,350 students, and has a budget of $668.3 million. The budget per student for the 2018-19 school year averaging to approximately $22,961. According to the district's 2021 budget, based on the 2010 U.S. census, the combined land area served is 55.3 square miles (143 km^{2}), with a population of 309,359.

== History ==
The formation of Pittsburgh's public schools in 1835 was due to the passing of the Pennsylvania Free Public School Act of 1834. This act provided government aid for establishing a city school system, which included the creation of four self-governed wards. Twenty years later, the wards were disbanded, and the Central Board of Education was founded. This board would govern the entire school district, which would consist of nine wards or sub- districts. The first city superintendent of schools was elected in 1868. In 1911, the School Code of the Commonwealth of Pennsylvania modified the existing system to include a Board of Public education that would oversee sixty-one sub-districts and two central boards. The Public School Code (Title 22) of 1949 further regulated the provisions and establishment of Pennsylvania state schools.

As stated in numerous district annual budgets, including 2021, "Although public education in Pittsburgh dates back to 1835, the consolidated District was founded in November 1911, as a result of an educational reform movement that combined the former 'ward' schools into one system with standardized educational and business policies. Initially the district was governed by an appointed Board of 15 members, but since 1976 has been governed by a nine-member Board elected by districts of relatively equal populations."

== Academics ==
In February 2006, eight underperforming schools were transformed into Accelerated Learning Academies (ALAs). The schools had 10 days added to their school calendar and 45 minutes of instructional time were added each day. The ALAs use the America's Choice Design Model, developed by the National Center on Education and the Economy.

In March 2006, the district contracted with Kaplan K12 Learning Services to develop a single, district-wide curriculum.

== The Pittsburgh Promise ==
On December 13, 2006, Pittsburgh Mayor Luke Ravenstahl and then Superintendent Mark Roosevelt announced an initiative called The Pittsburgh Promise. In 2008, the program became available to all graduates satisfying the criteria for a scholarship to any accredited post-secondary institution within Pennsylvania. The five to seven million dollars per year necessary to fund the program would be raised through private contributions from foundations and corporations.

In January 2007, the Pittsburgh Federation of Teachers made the first contribution to The Pittsburgh Promise scholarship program. In 2008, the University of Pittsburgh Medical Center made a $10 million donation with a commitment for as much as $90 million in additional matching funds over the next nine years. Since its founding, the program has helped nearly 12,000 students attend college by funneling $170 million into fees, tuition, and living expenses. In September 2023, the Pittsburgh Promise's executive director, Saleem Ghubril, sent a letter to district parents explaining that the Pittsburgh Public Schools' Class of 2028 will be the final group of students to receive scholarships.

== Board of Public Education of Pittsburgh ==
The Pittsburgh Public Schools has an elected, nine-member board of directors. The members serve a four-year term and represent districts within the city and the nearby borough of Mount Oliver. Like all other school board members in Pennsylvania, they receive no pay.

== Superintendent of Schools and Administration ==
On July 21, 2022, the Pittsburgh Board of Education announced that Dr. Wayne N. Walters will serve as Superintendent of Pittsburgh Public Schools. On August 1, 2022, Dr. Walters took over the top leadership position after serving as interim Superintendent for a 10-month period. The school district has various administrative departments: Office of the Superintendent, Student Support Services, Athletics, Human Resources, Curriculm and Instruction, Data, Research, Evaluation and Assessment, Facilities, Finance, and Law.

== Schools ==
=== Elementary schools (K–5) ===
- Allegheny Traditional Academy Elementary School
- Arsenal Elementary School
- Banksville Elementary School
- Beechwood Elementary School
- Concord Elementary School
- Dilworth Traditional Academy
- Faison K-5
- Fulton Academy of Geographic and Life Sciences
- Grandview Elementary School
- Lincoln School (two campuses: K–4 & 5–8)
- Liberty Elementary School
- Linden Elementary School
- Miller African Centered Academy
- Minadeo Elementary School
- Phillips K-5
- Pittsburgh Montessori (also: Pre-K)
- Roosevelt Elementary School (two campuses: Pre-K–1 & 2–5)
- Spring Hill Elementary School
- Weil PreK-5
- West Liberty Elementary School
- Westwood Elementary School
- Whittier Elementary School
- Woolslair Elementary School

=== K–8 schools ===
- Arlington- it will become a middle school in fall of 2026
- Brookline School
- Carmalt Academy of Science and Technology
- Colfax K-8
- Greenfield School
- King PreK-8
- Langley
- Manchester PreK-8
- Mifflin School
- Morrow Elementary School
- Sunnyside PreK-8

=== Middle schools (6–8) and Accelerated Learning Academies ===
- Allegheny Traditional Academy Middle School
- Arlington (opens in fall 2026)
- Arsenal Middle School
- Pittsburgh Classical Academy Middle School
- Schiller Classical Academy Middle School
- South Brook Middle School
- South Hills Middle School
- Sterrett Classical Academy
- Weil PreK-5

=== Secondary schools, grades 9-12 and 6-12 ===
- Barack Obama Academy of International Studies 6-12
- Brashear High School
- Carrick High School
- Perry Traditional Academy
- Pittsburgh Creative and Performing Arts School (6–12)
- Pittsburgh Science and Technology Academy (6–12)
- Taylor Allderdice High School
- University Preparatory School (6–12)
- Westinghouse High School

=== Special schools ===
- Conroy Education Center
- Oliver Citywide Academy
- Pioneer Education Center
- Pittsburgh Gifted Center
- Student Achievement Center High School
- Student Achievement Center Middle School
- Clayton Academy
- Pittsburgh Online Academy

=== Charter schools ===
As required by Pennsylvania state law, the district funds a number of charter schools:

- Academy Charter School (9–12)
- Career Connections Charter High School (9–12) – Charter renewed for five years on 21 March 2007
- City Charter High School (9–12) – Charter renewed for five years on 8 November 2006
- The Environmental Charter School at Frick Park K–8
- Hill House Passport Academy Charter School
- Manchester Academic Charter School (K–8)
- Northside Urban Pathways Charter School (6–12)
- Renaissance Academy of Pittsburgh Alternative of Hope (K–5) – Charter renewal denied by board on 25 April 2006
- Urban League of Pittsburgh Charter School (K–5)
- Career Connections Charter Middle School – closed 2006

=== Former schools ===
- Mount Oliver School opened circa 1890. The school district closed it in 1980, and it planned to hand the school over to the Mount Oliver municipal government, which planned to use the building for office space and community center purposes.

== See also ==
- List of school districts in Pennsylvania
