= Peabody High School (Pennsylvania) =

Coordinates: 40.46694°N 79.92333°W

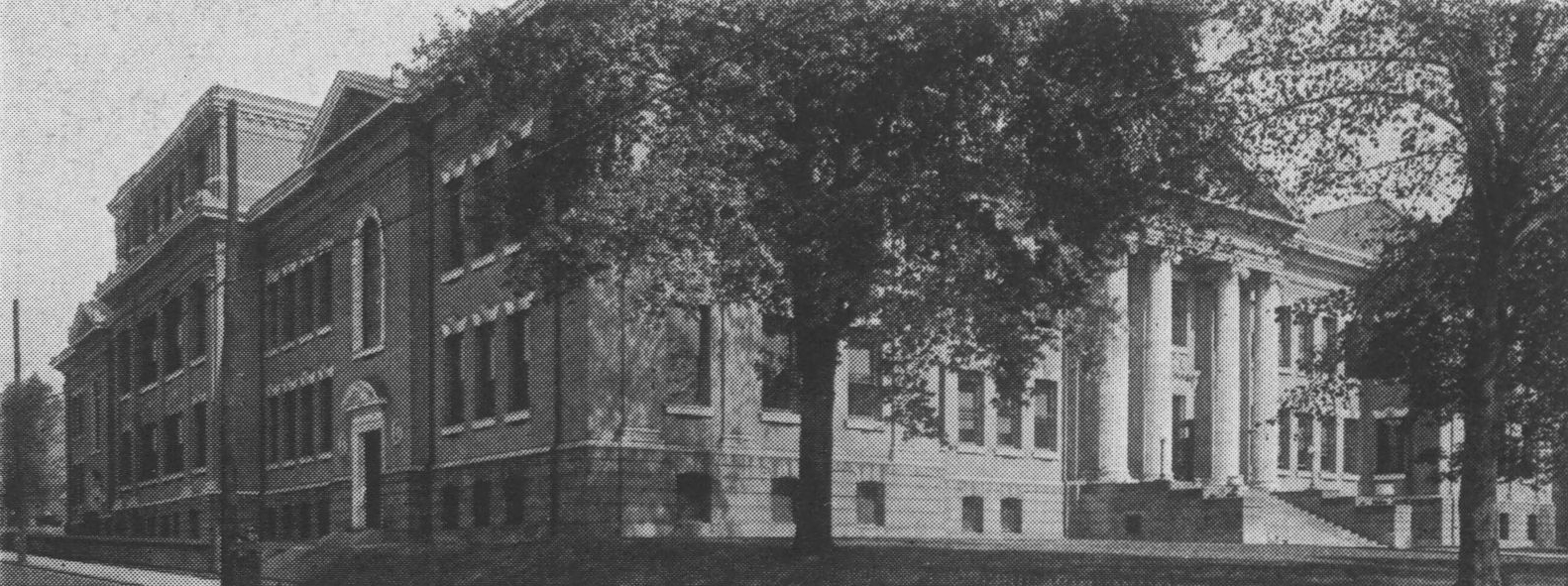
- Peabody High School in 1916
- 515 N. Highland Avenue; Pittsburgh, PA 15206; United States

Information
- Type: Public
- Established: 1911
- Closed: 2011
- School district: Pittsburgh Public Schools
- Colors: Maroon and gray
- Mascot: Highlander

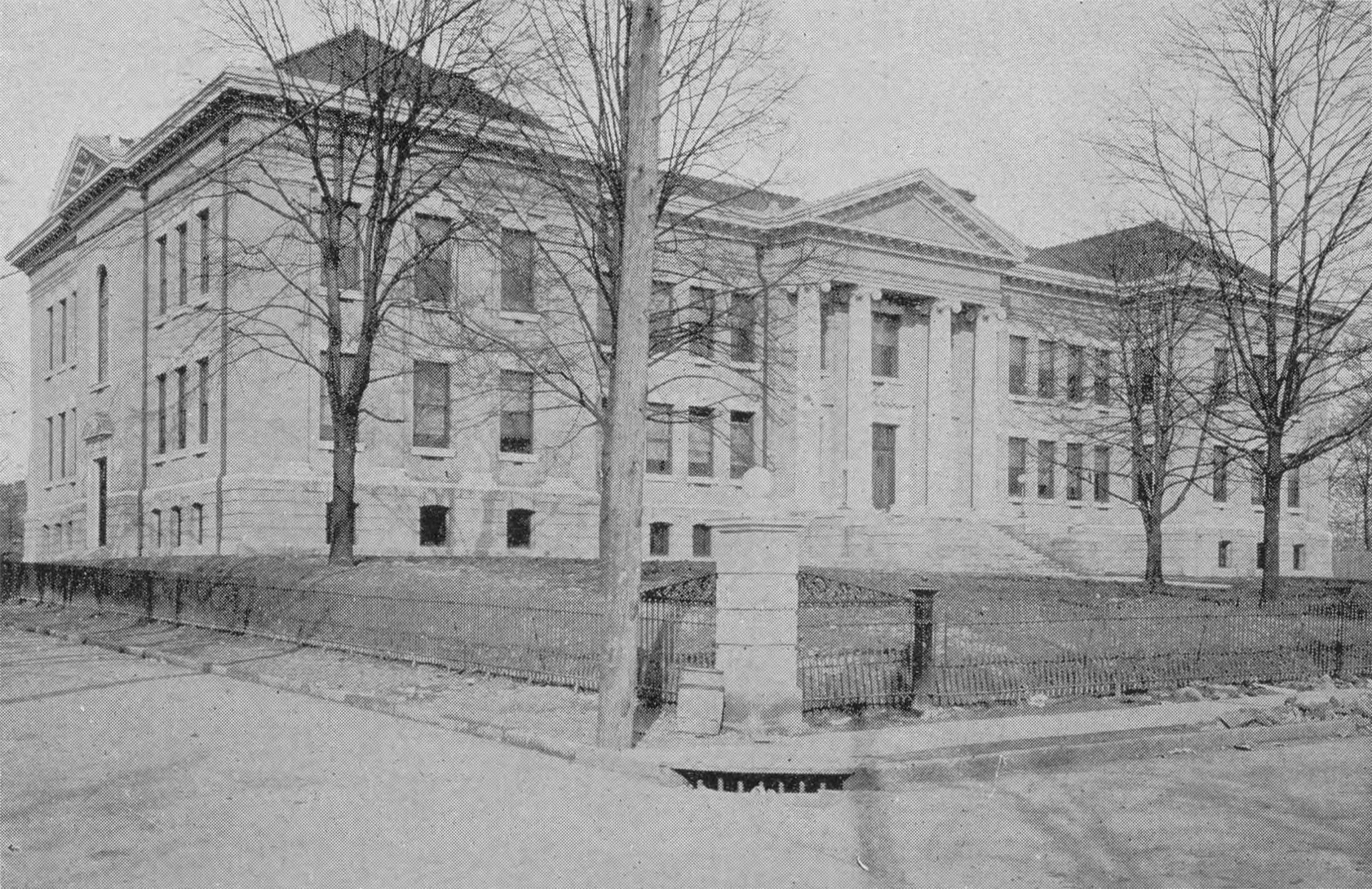
The original Margaretta School building as it appeared in 1905

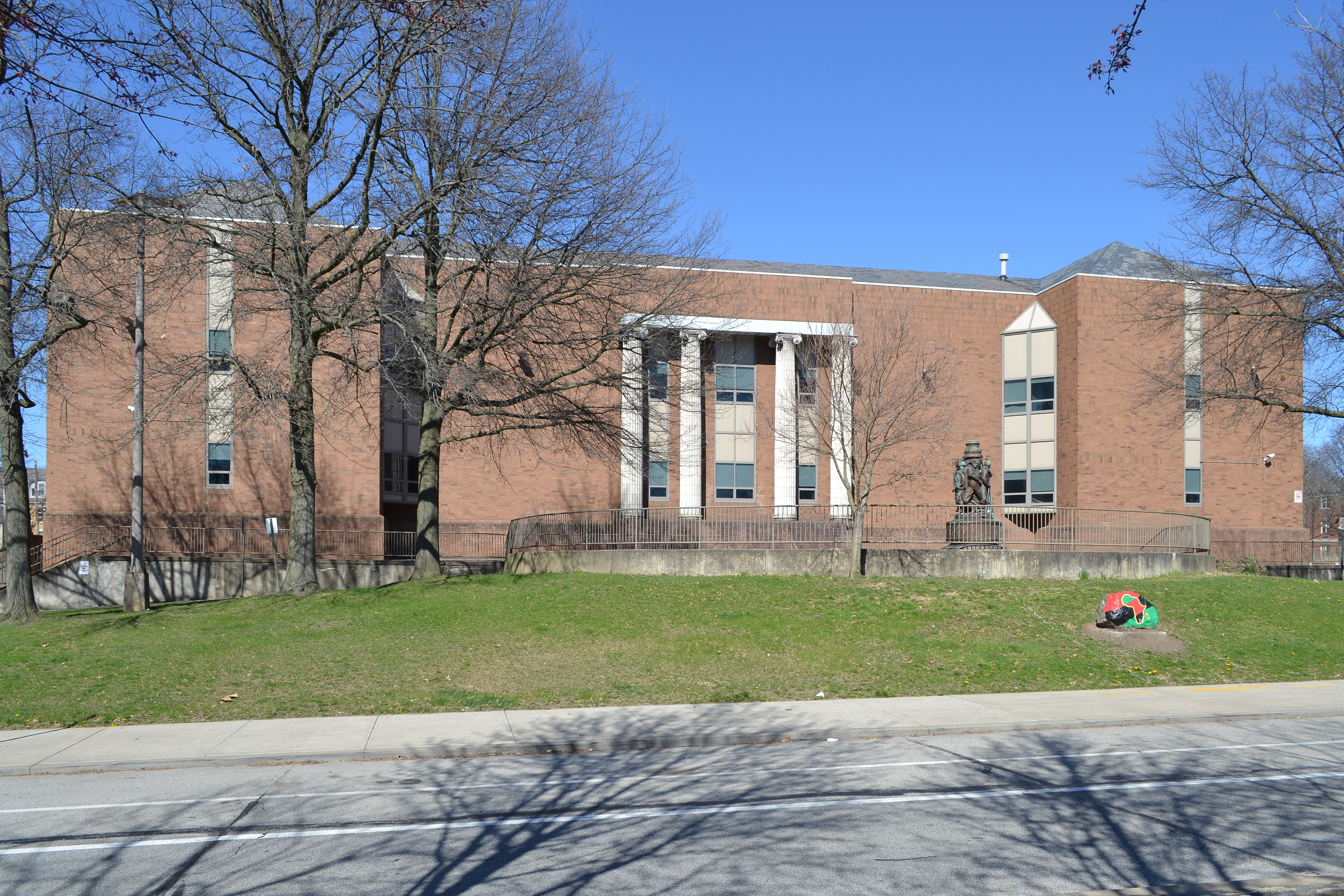
Former Peabody High building, now used by Obama 6–12, in 2024

Peabody High School was a public school in Pittsburgh, Pennsylvania, in the neighborhood of East Liberty. The school opened in 1911 in the renovated former Margaretta Street elementary school and was rededicated in honor of Highland Park physician Dr. Benjamin Helm Peabody. After 100 years in operation, the school board of the Pittsburgh Public Schools voted to close the school and graduate its final class in 2011.

The Barack Obama Academy of International Studies 6-12 relocated to the building starting in the 2012–2013 school year. The Peabody name was no longer used.

== History ==
The site at Highland Avenue and Margaretta Street (now East Liberty Boulevard) which eventually became Peabody High School was previously occupied by the old Highland (19th Ward) public school, which opened in 1870. This was replaced in 1901–02 by the Margaretta School, a $170,000 Neoclassical building designed by Charles M. Bartberger.

In 1911, a new $237,000 addition designed by Bartberger, Cooley & Bartberger was built at the rear of the Margaretta School. Since there was extra space in the building and the demand for secondary education in Pittsburgh had been rapidly increasing, the school board decided to open a high school there. It was named Peabody High School in honor of Dr. Benjamin Helm Peabody (1825–1910), a physician and longtime member of the 19th Ward school board.

By its second year of operation, the high school had about 1,100 students and was so crowded that the Margaretta grade school students had to shift to a half-day schedule to provide more space. To relieve the crowding, the Pittsburgh Board of Public Education opened Schenley High School and Westinghouse High School (both in temporary quarters) in 1912. In 1915, with an expected enrollment of nearly 1,800 students, Peabody took over the entire Margaretta building and the grade school students were reassigned to the new Dilworth and Rogers elementary schools. A further three-story addition designed by Edward B. Lee was built in 1923–25 at a cost of $700,000.

Pittsburgh Public Schools undertook a major $13 million remodeling of the building in 1975–78 which added a new gymnasium, swimming pool, library, and cafeteria, and moved the main entrance to the Highland Avenue side. The project, designed by architect N. John Cunzolo, also covered the building with a mostly windowless brick exterior which obscured the original architecture. Four Ionic columns which surrounded the original main entrance were preserved. The school remained open during construction with students attending on a split half-day schedule since there was no cafeteria.

== World War I memorial ==
A memorial honoring 560 Peabody High alumni and students who served in World War I, including 17 who were killed, was dedicated on Memorial Day in 1924. The memorial consists of a bronze sculptural group by Frank Vittor above a cylindrical pedestal inscribed with the names of the students and resting on a granite base. The sculpture depicts seven figures. Counterclockwise from the west side, these are Columbia with a trumpet calling the American youth to fight, a young man answering the call, a son and mother bidding a tearful farewell, a hooded figure mourning the dead, and a returning soldier being crowned with laurels by a figure of victory. Among the names on the memorial is that of noted writer and editor Malcolm Cowley, who served as an ambulance driver with the American Field Service during the war.

In 2024, the memorial underwent a $20,000 restoration project which involved cleaning and sealing the bronze and replacing a missing hand on the Victory figure. The surrounding area was also renovated and outfitted with picnic tables to serve as an outdoor student lounge area. The restored memorial was unveiled on May 30, 2024, the 100th anniversary of its original dedication.

== Notable alumni ==
- Kevan Barlow – NFL player
- Mike Barnes – NFL player
- Romare Bearden – artist and writer
- Mel Bennett – NBA player
- Kenneth Burke – literary theorist who wrote on 20th-century philosophy, aesthetics, criticism, and rhetorical theory
- Martha E. Church – college president
- Malcolm Cowley – novelist, poet, literary critic and journalist
- John P. Daley, U.S. Army lieutenant general
- Billy Eckstine – singer and bandleader
- Ed Gainey – politician
- George Otto Gey – cell biologist
- Jack Gilbert – poet
- Barry Goldberg – volleyball coach
- Frank Gorshin – actor and comedian
- Charles Grodin – actor, comedian, author and television talk show host
- Gene Kelly – dancer, actor and choreographer
- Marie S. Klooz – lawyer, pacifist
- James Light, theatre director and actor
- David Logan – NFL player Tampa Bay Buccaneers
- Lorin Maazel – conductor, violinist and composer
- Michael "Dodo" Marmarosa – jazz pianist
- Natalie Moorhead – actress
- Zelda Rubinstein – actor, and human rights activist
- Edith S. Sampson – lawyer, judge and United Nations delegate
- Robert Schmertz – artist
- Bryon Shane – Union Official and Activist
- Bob Smizik – newspaper sportswriter and columnist
- David Stock – composer and conductor, founder of the Pittsburgh New Music Ensemble
- Burton Tansky – department store executive
- David Tepper – hedge fund manager and philanthropist, Owner of the NFL's Carolina Panthers and the MLS's Charlotte FC
- Regis Toomey – actor
- Fritz Weaver – actor
- John Edgar Wideman – writer and professor
- Jonathan Wolken – dancer, co-founder, artistic director of Pilobolus dance company
- Louise Fulton - professional bowler
- Yitzchok Scheiner Israeli–American rabbi
