= Chauncey Eskridge =

American attorney and judge (1917–1988)

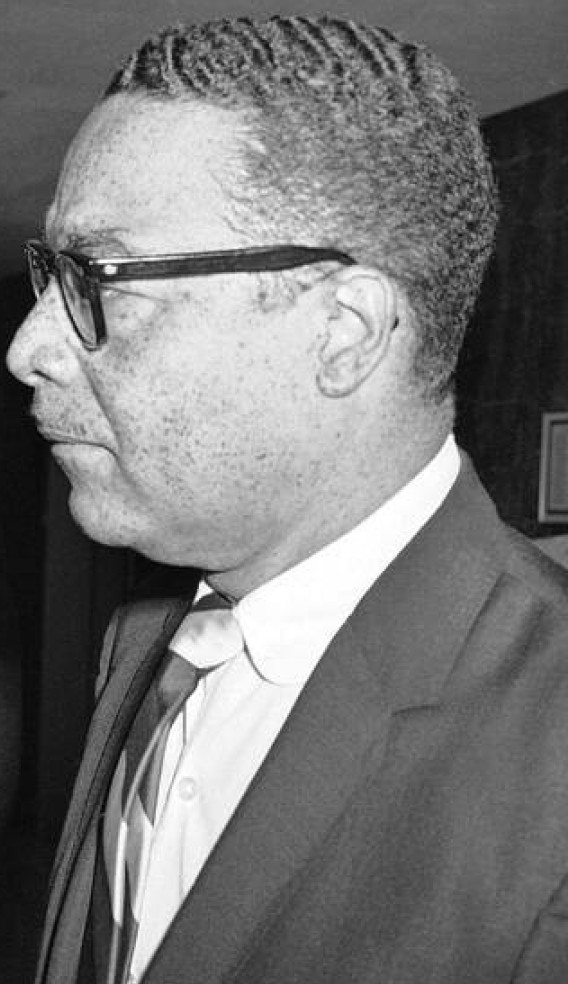
- Eskridge in 1967
- Born: November 11, 1917; Pittsburgh, Pennsylvania
- Died: January 18, 1988 (aged 70); Oak Forest, Illinois
- Education: Westinghouse High School; Tuskegee Institute; John Marshall Law School
- Occupations: Lawyer and judge
- Known for: Attorney for Muhammad Ali and Martin Luther King Jr.
- Spouse: Rosalyn Lindsay Eskridge
- Children: 2

Chauncey Eskridge (November 11, 1917 – January 18, 1988) was an American attorney and judge. He provided legal counseling for activist Martin Luther King Jr., one of the leaders of the civil rights movement. He served on the legal team of world heavyweight boxing champion Muhammad Ali, and argued the Clay v. United States case in which the Supreme Court of the United States overturned Ali's conviction for refusing to serve in the United States Army during the Vietnam War.

Eskridge was also a U.S. Army Air Force officer and combat fighter pilot with the 332nd Fighter Group's 99th Fighter Squadron, best known as the Tuskegee Airmen, "Red Tails," or “Schwartze Vogelmenschen” ("Black Birdmen") among enemy German pilots.

== Early life, Education, Tuskegee Airmen ==
Eskridge grew up in Homewood, a predominantly African-American neighborhood in Pittsburgh, Pennsylvania. He attended Westinghouse High School. He graduated from the Tuskegee Institute in 1939.

During World War II, he served as a pilot in Italy as one of the Tuskegee Airmen and flew 105 combat missions. After the war, Eskridge attended John Marshall Law School in Chicago, graduating in 1949.

== Legal career ==
Eskridge advised the Southern Christian Leadership Conference, an African-American civil rights organization, in the late 1960s. He was also the executive director of the Southern Christian Leadership Foundation. Eskridge represented Martin Luther King Jr. in the City of Memphis v. Martin Luther King at the 5th U.S. Circuit Court of Appeals. This was King's last case. Eskridge was present at the Memphis hotel where King was assassinated in April 1968. He helped place King on a stretcher at the hotel and accompanied him to the hospital. After King's death, Eskridge also represented King's estate.

Eskridge was a member of Muhammad Ali's legal team. His most importance case for Ali was Clay v. United States, in which Ali was appealing to the Supreme Court of the United States to overturn his conviction for refusing to be inducted into the United States Army during the Vietnam War. Ali had been sentenced to the maximum penalty of five years in jail and a fine of $10,000. Eskridge argued that Ali satisfied the three tenets for conscientious objector status: that his objection to war was religiously based, that he was sincere, and that he was opposed to all wars. The last tenet was contentious because the Nation of Islam only forbade Ali from participating in wars "not ordered by Allah". Although the Supreme Court initially voted 5–3 against Ali, they later revoted 8–0 in favor of Ali after Justice John Harlan decided to change his vote. Harlan made this decision after being persuaded by his clerks to read Elijah Muhammad's book Message to the Blackman in America, which convinced him that Ali indeed qualified for conscientious objector status.

Eskridge became a judge in 1981 and served as an associate judge on the Cook County Circuit Court until 1986.

== Media representation ==
Eskridge was portrayed by Joe Morton in the 2001 biopic Ali about Muhammad Ali. He was portrayed by Chuck Cooper in the film Muhammad Ali's Greatest Fight about the Clay v. United States case in the Supreme Court. In the film The Muhammad Ali Story, he was portrayed by Paul Winfield.

== Personal life ==
Eskridge married Rosalyn Lindsay. They had two children, Victor Henry Eskridge and Victoria Eskridge Squires. Eskridge died in January 1988 at Oak Forest Hospital after spending eleven months in a coma. He had been residing in Avalon Park at the time.

Eskridge served on the board of directors for the Amalgamated Trust and Savings Bank beginning in 1968, making him the first African-American director of a bank in Chicago.
