= Pittsburgh Gifted Center =

Coordinates: 40.448674°N 80.049789°W

- 1400 Crucible Street; Pittsburgh, PA 15205

Information
- Type: Public
- School district: Pittsburgh Public Schools
- Principal: Mr. David May
- Grades: 1–8
- Enrollment: 1600–1900 Varies throughout year
- Information: 412-338-3820
- Representative: Floyd McCrea
- Website: Pittsburgh Gifted Center

Pittsburgh Landmark – PHLF
- Designated: 2002

Pittsburgh Gifted Center (PGC) is a K-8 special education school that provides gifted education to students in Pittsburgh.

Until May 2006, the Pittsburgh Gifted Center was located at the McKelvy building in the Pittsburgh Hill District.

In September 2006, the Pittsburgh Gifted Center was made part of a school in Pittsburgh's West End called Greenway. The move to Greenway was made with the understanding that it was only a one-year shift of location. The location for 2007-08 was cancelled and instead moving to 2016.

The early draft of the Rightsizing Plan of Superintendent Mark Roosevelt called for the Pittsburgh Gifted Center to move to Pittsburgh's North Side on Ridge Avenue. That plan was nixed as the facility was not well suited to accommodate the programs. A shift to Greenway was accomplished after some political wrangling by school officials.

The Ridge Avenue facility owned by the Pittsburgh Public Schools was put up for sale from 2006 until 2008.

== Goals ==
The Center is to provide students the opportunity to interact with students from other parts of the city and provide academic and enrichment opportunities not available in normal schools.

== Programs ==
Students attend once every week on a particular day, with small classes of about 12 students. All students attending are from Pittsburgh Public Schools. Until 2010, the Gifted Center accepted students from local parochial schools.

There is a variety of academic courses, and the Gifted Center provides students the opportunities to choose which ones they wish to attend. They include subjects related to basic courses, like Humanities, Math, Art, and Science.

Students can also choose interest and technological courses, including JavaScript, business planning, and Web Design. The Gifted Center has also integrated technology into classes, with all rooms containing computers for student research and projects. Some of these classes may further expand on a subject for traditional school (for example, there is a Genetics class that goes into greater depth in the study of DNA than normal school classes) or they may deal with a radically different subject (for example, one teacher has trigonometry course).

Information on the Gifted Center:

- Demographics: African Americans 28%–35%, White/Other 65%–72%
- School year: September to June

Along with its weekly classes, the PGC allows students to participate in extracurricular activities and competitions, usually on Saturdays. The Gifted Center has participated in National History Day, in which two of its students attended the state competition at Penn State University. PGC also had a team that entered English Festival, a reading competition sponsored by Duquesne University, and Math Counts. The Gifted Center is also considering offering additional competitions for students to join.

The goal of the school participation is to improve public relations, boast school spirit, and to gain support to preserve the school. Mr. Peglow, the school's Social Studies teacher who administered National History Day for the school this year, is also planning to offer the competition as a class to boast the number of students participating and allowing larger group projects.

The PGC was in the news when it was considered to be closed under the Superintendent Mark Roosevelt's school reform agenda. In an attempt to conserve financial resources, the superintendent wanted to return gifted education to the home schools, which could exclude smaller schools from participating in the program. However, the proposal faced stiff opposition from parents and students (some students organized a petition to save the Gifted Center; another wrote a letter opposing the closing of the Gifted Center which was published in Post-Gazette). Eventually, the board agreed to move the Center to the Ridge Avenue building, where the program existed for several years. Some people still suspect that the School Board is still considering closing the Center and it is unclear whether renovations to the Ridge Avenue building will be completed before the next school year.

The PGC has a bimonthly newsletter, the Gifted Gazette.
