= Frzy =

American rapper (born 1985)

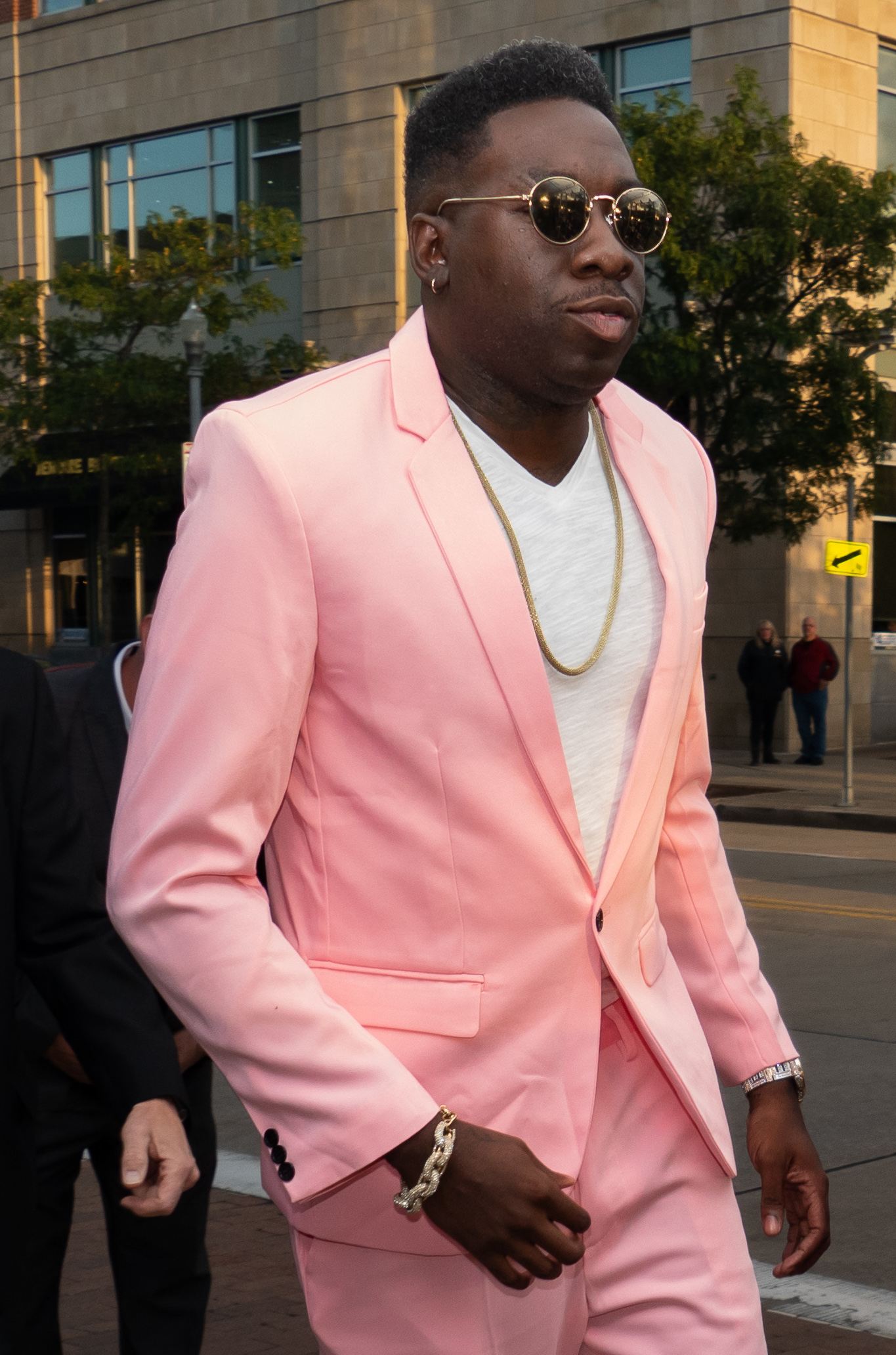
- Frzy at Steelers Fashion Show 2019
- Born: Harvey Alexander Daniels; November 1, 1985 (age 40); Pittsburgh, Pennsylvania, U.S.
- Awards: Mid-Atlantic Regional Emmy Award 2018
- Website: thefrzy.com

Harvey Alexander Daniels (born November 1, 1985), better known by his stage name Frzy, is an American rapper.

== Early life and career ==
Frzy was born and raised in Pittsburgh, Pennsylvania. He began rapping in 2003 after winning a music contest sponsored by the Boys & Girls Clubs of America during his senior year at Career Connections Charter High School in Lawrenceville.

In 2013, he released the song "WTF", featuring X Factor finalist Lyric Da Queen, along with a corresponding music video.

In September 2016, he released his 24-track debut album God King Slave under Mogul Moves, Inc.

On December 18, 2018, January 11 was officially declared as Frzy Day in Allegheny County, Pennsylvania by the Pittsburgh City Council.

In 2019, he released the song "Gold In It", produced by Mayce and Art & Life.

He joined the Steve Madden Self-Made Campaign in 2019, participating in a roundtable discussion with company founder and former CEO Steve Madden on October 2, 2019, and being featured by the shoe company as a face of the brand.

On January 11, 2020, he officially broke the Guinness World Record for Longest Rap Marathon (individual), freestyle rapping for 31 hours and 52 seconds. The record has been approved by the Guinness World Records office.

In 2023, Frzy was invited by the Pittsburgh Symphony to develop a live concert to coincide with the release of his double album, Popularity vs. Success (released October 31, 2023 by The Orchard). "The Glorious Succession of Frzy" premiered on November 8, 2023 at Heinz Hall for the Performing Arts, with an entirely original set of arrangements and new works composed and orchestrated by Christian Kriegeskotte (including the cinematic overture, "Frzy's Theme"). The concert was conducted by Moon Doh.

Philanthropy

Frzy performed to a sold-out crowd with Dan + Shay and The Andy Davis Band at the Concert for Unity on December 2, 2018. The concert, held at the Byham Theater in Pittsburgh, Pennsylvania, raised more than $60,000 to benefit the Tree of Life Synagogue, which was the site of a mass shooting on October 27, 2018.

In 2018, he became a global ambassador for WhyHunger through their Artists Against Hunger and Poverty initiative, raising funds and awareness to “support lasting solutions to hunger and build the movement for food justice.” He appeared on the Absolutely Mindy Show on SiriusXM's Kids Place Live in November 2019 for the annual Hungerthon donation drive.

== Awards ==
On October 13, 2018, Frzy won a Regional Emmy Award for his collaboration with WQED Multimedia on a hip hop remake of “Won’t You Be My Neighbor?” (song), originally written by Fred Rogers for the television show Mister Rogers’ Neighborhood. The video segment, titled “The Sweater Sessions: Frzy”, won Best Program Feature/Segment in the Arts/Entertainment category at the 2018 Mid-Atlantic Chapter Regional Emmy Awards.
