= Kenny Robinson (American football) =

American football player (born 1999)

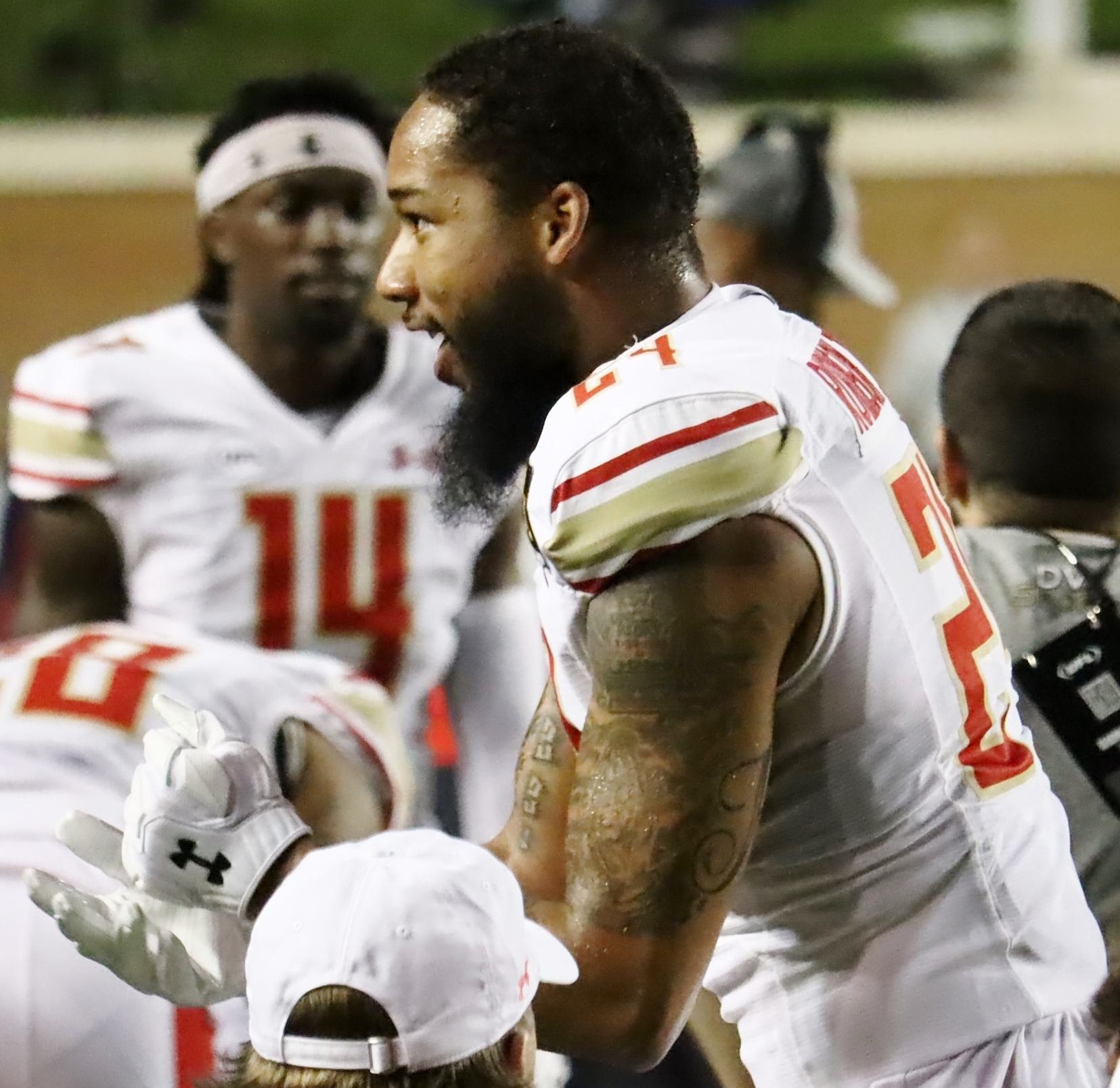
- Robinson with the Birmingham Stallions in 2024

No. 6
- Position: Safety

Personal information
- Born: January 8, 1999 (age 27); Wilkinsburg, Pennsylvania, U.S.
- Listed height: 6 ft 2 in (1.88 m)
- Listed weight: 208 lb (94 kg)

Career information
- High school: Imani Christian Academy (Pittsburgh, Pennsylvania)
- College: West Virginia (2017–2018)
- NFL draft: 2020: 5th round, 152nd overall pick

Career history
- St. Louis BattleHawks (2020); Carolina Panthers (2020–2022); Pittsburgh Steelers (2023)*; Birmingham Stallions (2024–2025); Louisville Kings (2026)
- * Offseason or practice squad member only

Awards and highlights
- 2x UFL champion (2024, 2026); Midseason All-XFL (2020)

Career NFL statistics
- Total tackles: 18
- Stats at Pro Football Reference

Kenneth Robinson Jr. (born January 8, 1999) is an American former professional football player who was a safety in the National Football League (NFL). He played college football for the West Virginia Mountaineers. He played in the NFL for the Carolina Panthers. He also played for the St. Louis BattleHawks of the XFL.

== Early life ==
Robinson grew up in Wilkinsburg, Pennsylvania, and began his high school career as a freshman at Central Catholic before transferring to University Prep. His junior season was derailed by a leg injury. After the season, Robinson transferred to Imani Christian Academy for his senior year. He was named PIAA all-state 1A first-team as a defensive back. A 3-star recruit, Robinson committed to West Virginia over offers from Virginia Tech, Iowa State, Toledo, Temple, Cincinnati and Pittsburgh.

== College career ==
Robinson mainly played safety for the Mountaineers at West Virginia University after playing cornerback for several games as a freshman. He returned an interception 94 yards for a touchdown against Texas as a freshman and made the game-saving pick versus Kansas State. Robinson had 123 tackles and 7 interceptions, two of which were returned for a defensive touchdown, in his two-year college career. He was named to the First-team All-Big 12 Conference after his sophomore season. Robinson was expelled from West Virginia after a student code of conduct violation involving academic fraud. He initially entered the transfer portal in June 2019, but ultimately decided to join the XFL to provide for his family's immediate needs. Robinson's ambitious professional move was praised as "trailblazing" by USA Today.

=== College statistics ===
Defense & Fumbles						Tack					Def					Fumb			
Year	School	Conf	Class	Pos	G	Solo	Ast	Tot	Loss	Sk	Int	Yds	Avg	TD	PD	FR	Yds	TD	FF
*2017	West Virginia	Big 12	FR	S	11	32	14	46	2.0	0.0	3	170	56.7	2	3	0			0
*2018	West Virginia	Big 12	SO	S	12	52	25	77	2.0	0.0	4	58	14.5	0	4	1			1
Career	West Virginia					84	39	123	4.0	0.0	7	228	32.6	2	7	1			1

== Professional career ==
Pre-draft measurables
Height	Weight
6 ft 0 3/4 in (1.85 m)	202 lb (92 kg)
Values from Pro Day

=== St. Louis BattleHawks ===
In October 2019, Robinson was selected by the St. Louis BattleHawks of the XFL via the 2020 XFL draft. He was selected in the 5th round (39th overall) of Phase 4: Defensive Backs. Robinson was the only player in the XFL who was eligible for the 2020 NFL draft, and the XFL paid for him to take college classes online. He said he chose the XFL to help his mother, who had been diagnosed with cancer. In Week 3 of the season, Robinson had an interception, and in Week 5, he was nominated for the XFL's Star of the Week with a pick and a sack. In the coronavirus-shortened XFL season, Robinson started all five games for the BattleHawks and had 21 tackles and two interceptions. He had his contract terminated when the league suspended operations on April 10, 2020.

=== Carolina Panthers ===
The Carolina Panthers selected Robinson with the 152nd pick in the fifth round of the 2020 NFL draft, making him the first XFL player to be drafted into the NFL. Robinson was represented at the draft by Beyond Athlete Management. He was waived on September 6, 2020, and re-signed to the practice squad the next day. Robinson was promoted to the active roster on October 20.

On August 31, 2021, Robinson was waived by the Panthers, and re-signed to the practice squad the next day. He was promoted to the active roster on October 14.

In Week 6 against the Minnesota Vikings, Robinson scored his first NFL touchdown on a special teams play; he recovered a punt blocked by teammate Frankie Luvu for 4 yards to the end zone during the 34–28 overtime loss.

On August 30, 2022, Robinson was waived by the Panthers and signed to the practice squad the next day. He was released on September 2, and re-signed on October 5.

=== Pittsburgh Steelers ===
On January 11, 2023, Robinson signed a reserve/futures contract with the Pittsburgh Steelers. He was waived by the Steelers on August 28.

=== Birmingham Stallions ===
On November 30, 2023, Robinson signed with the Birmingham Stallions of the United States Football League (USFL). He re-signed with the team on August 23, 2024.

=== Louisville Kings ===
On January 13, 2026, Robinson was selected by the Louisville Kings in the 2026 UFL draft. He announced his retirement from professional football on April 2.
