= Muhammad Ali's Greatest Fight =

- Television release poster
- Genre: Drama
- Based on: Muhammad Ali's Greatest Fight: Cassius Clay vs. the United States of America by: Howard Bingham; Max Wallace
- Written by: Shawn Slovo
- Directed by: Stephen Frears
- Starring: Christopher Plummer; Frank Langella; Ed Begley, Jr.; Peter Gerety; Barry Levinson; John Bedford Lloyd
- Composer: George Fenton
- Country of origin: United States
- Original language: English

Production
- Executive producers: Tracey Scoffield; Frank Doelger; Jonathan Cameron
- Producer: Scott Ferguson
- Cinematography: Jim Denault
- Editor: Mick Audsley
- Running time: 97 minutes
- Production companies: Rainmark Films; Sakura Films

Original release
- Network: HBO
- Release: October 5, 2013

Muhammad Ali's Greatest Fight is a 2013 American television drama film about boxer Muhammad Ali's refusal to report for induction into the United States military during the Vietnam War, focusing on how the United States Supreme Court decided to rule in Ali's favor in the 1971 case of Clay v. United States. The film was directed by Stephen Frears, from a screenplay written by Shawn Slovo based on the 2000 book Muhammad Ali's Greatest Fight: Cassius Clay vs. the United States of America by Howard Bingham and Max Wallace. It premiered on HBO on October 5, 2013.

== Cast ==
- Christopher Plummer as Justice John Marshall Harlan II
- Frank Langella as Chief Justice Warren E. Burger
- Ed Begley Jr. as Justice Harry Blackmun
- Peter Gerety as Justice William J. Brennan Jr.
- Barry Levinson as Justice Potter Stewart
- John Bedford Lloyd as Justice Byron White
- Fritz Weaver as Justice Hugo Black (Weaver was himself a conscientious objector during World War II)
- Harris Yulin as Justice William O. Douglas
- Danny Glover as Justice Thurgood Marshall
- Benjamin Walker as Kevin Connolly
- Pablo Schreiber as Covert Becker
- Ben Steinfeld as Sam Edelstein
- Dana Ivey as Mrs. Paige
- Kathleen Chalfant as Ethel Harlan
- Lisa Joyce as Donna Connolly
- Peter McRobbie as Erwin Griswold
- Damian Young as Ramsey Clark
- Chuck Cooper as Chauncey Eskridge
- Bob Balaban as Lawyer
- Drew Gehling as Marshall's Clerk

== Reception ==
The film has a rating of 38% in Rotten Tomatoes.

Hank Stuever of The Washington Post commented that the film, focused as it was on the behind-the-scenes legal discussion of the Supreme Court's justices and law clerks, and depicting one of Harlan's law clerks (a character that was "a fictional composite of several clerks") as playing a central role in the court's decision to free Ali, was at times "too much like a substandard episode of The Paper Chase" and "more Wikipedia entry than story, as characters speak to one another in long paragraphs of legal exposition".

The Post did have positive comments about the lead performances of Langella and Plummer. Christopher Howse of The Daily Telegraph said the film "was worth watching in the comfort of the home, but if it had been shown in a cinema, it would hardly have been worth stirring from the fireside for."

Mary McNamara of the Los Angeles Times also commented on the excellent performances of the cast, while concluding that "[t]he legal wrangling of eight old white men behind closed doors simply pales in comparison" to Ali's part of the story. Ali is not portrayed by an actor in the film, but instead Frears made repeated use of television news clips of Ali boxing, giving interviews, and performing. These clips of Ali are mentioned in reviews as among the best elements of the film.

== See also ==
- Supreme Court of the United States in fiction
