= Martha E. Church =

American college president (1931–2019)

- Born: 1931; Pittsburgh, Pennsylvania, U.S.
- Died: January 27, 2019 (aged 87–88)
- Occupations: College president and professor
- Known for: President of Hood College

Academic background
- Education: Wesley College; University of Pittsburgh; University of Chicago

Academic work
- Discipline: Geography
- Institutions: Hood College Wilson College; Wesley College; Mount Holyoke College Middle States Association of Colleges and Secondary Schools

Martha E. Church (1931 – January 27, 2019) was an American geographer, professor, and college president. She was the first female president of Hood College.

== Early life ==
Church was a native of Pittsburgh, Pennsylvania. She was the daughter of Eleanor Boyer and Walter S. Church. Her father was a civil engineer and the superintendent of construction for Duquesne Light. Her mother was the president of Wellesley College's Alumnae Association. Her family were Presbyterians.

Church graduated from Peabody High School in Pittsburgh. She had three degrees in geography. She received a B.A. in geography from Wesley College in 1952. She also received an M.A. in geography from the University of Pittsburgh and a Ph.D. in geography from the University of Chicago. In 1959, she was awarded a fellowship by the Educational Foundation of the American Association of University Women; she used to award to study geography at the University of Chicago.

== Career ==
She was a geography instructor at Carlow University and the Indiana University of Pennsylvania. She was a faculty member of Mount Holyoke College from 1953 to 1957. She was an assistant professor at Wesley College from 1958 to 1963. Church was a professor of geography and dean of the college at Wilson College from July 1965 to 1971. In 1970, she was elected to a three-year term as the associate executive secretary of the Commission of Higher Education of the Middle States Association of Colleges and Secondary Schools in 1971.

Church was a consultant for a high school geography project that was sponsored by the National Council of Geographic Education and the American Association of Geographers. She was one of three people appointed to compile and edit a list of atlases, journals, and textbooks for the American Association. of Geographers, a project funded by the National Science Foundation.

Church became president of Hood College on August 1, 1975, and served in this capacity through June 30, 1995. Under her leadership there, the college's endowment grew from $3 million to $39 million. In total, the five-year fundraising campaign raised $47 million. She also added several buildings to the campus, including the Beneficial-Hodson Library and Information Technology Center, the Hodson Science link, the Joseph A. Pastore Facilities Center, and the Lawrence Marx Jr., Resource Management Center.

After she retired from Hood College, Church worked to reform secondary education in China as a part-time senior scholar at the Carnegie Foundation for the Advancement of Teaching. She served as Interim President of Illinois College from 2002-2003.

== Professional affiliations ==
In 1989, Church was elected to the board of trustees of the National Geographic Society. She also served on the Board of Trustees of the National Geographic's Education Foundation. She was the treasurer of the National Council for Geographic Education and the secretary/treasurer of the New England–St. Lawrence Valley Geographical Society. She was a member of the American Association for the Advancement of Science and the National Association of Women Deans and Counselor.

Church served on the boards of Bradford College and the Peddie School in Hightstown, New Jersey. She was the chairman of the board of trustees of Hood College from 2006 to 2008.

== Awards and honors ==
Church received a distinguished teacher award at Wilson College. In June 1971, she received an honorary doctor of science degree from Lake Erie College.

Before her retirement in 1995, the road leading to Alumni Hall on the college campus was named Martha E. Church Drive. Hood College also gave her an honorary doctorate in 1995 and named her president emeritus. It also commissioned a portrait of Church that hangs in the lobby of Alumni Hall and a bust of Church that is displayed in its Beneficial-Hodson Library. In addition, the faculty of Hood College endowed a scholarship in her name.

She received honorary degrees from ten institutions of higher education during her lifetime, including Illinois College in 2003.

After her death, Hood College named the Martha E. Church Center for Community & Civic Engagement in her honor.

== Personal life ==
In 1982, Church was elected to board of directors of the Farmers and Mechanics National Bank. In 1988, she became one of the first female members of the Cosmos Club. She was a member of the American Association of University Women and Sigma Delta Epsilon honor society.

Hood died at the age of 88 on January 27, 2019. Hood College held a memorial service for Church on May 5, 2019, in Coffman Chapel.

== Selected publications ==
- "A Bibliography of Basic Books on Geography". with Robert E. Huke and Wilbur Zelinksy. The Professional Geographer vol. 16, no. 4 (1964): 31"Teacher Education: A Vision for the Future". in A View from the Top Liberal Arts Presidents on Teacher Education. Thomas Warren, editor. Association of Independent Liberal Arts Colleges for Teacher Education, 1990. p. 65–72. ISBN 9780819179814
- "The Dwindling Enrollment Pool: Issues and Opportunities." in Students and Their Institutions. Washington, D.C.: American Council on Education, 1978.
- "Potential Impact of Recent National Reports on Preservice Art Education". in The Preservice Challenge: Discipline-Based Art Education and Recent Reports on Higher Education: Seminar Proceedings, August 8–15, 1987 Snowbird, Utah a National Invitational Seminar. Oxford University Press, 1988, p. 102.
- "Preparing the next Generation of Academic Leaders". with Brown, David G., Richard E. Chait et al. Liberal Education vol. 76, no. 1 (1990): 32.
- "A Model of Sophomore Community Service". University-Community Partnerships: Current Practices. United States. Department of Housing and Urban Development. Office of Policy Development and Research. Office of University Partnerships, 1995. p. 9–10.
- "A View From One Presidential Office." in Against the Tide Career Paths of Women Leaders in American and British Higher Education. Karen Doyle Walton, editor. Phi Delta Kappa Educational Foundation, 1996. ISBN 9780873674904
