= Barack Obama Academy of International Studies 6–12 =

Coordinates: 40.46694°N 79.92333°W

Pittsburgh Obama 6–12
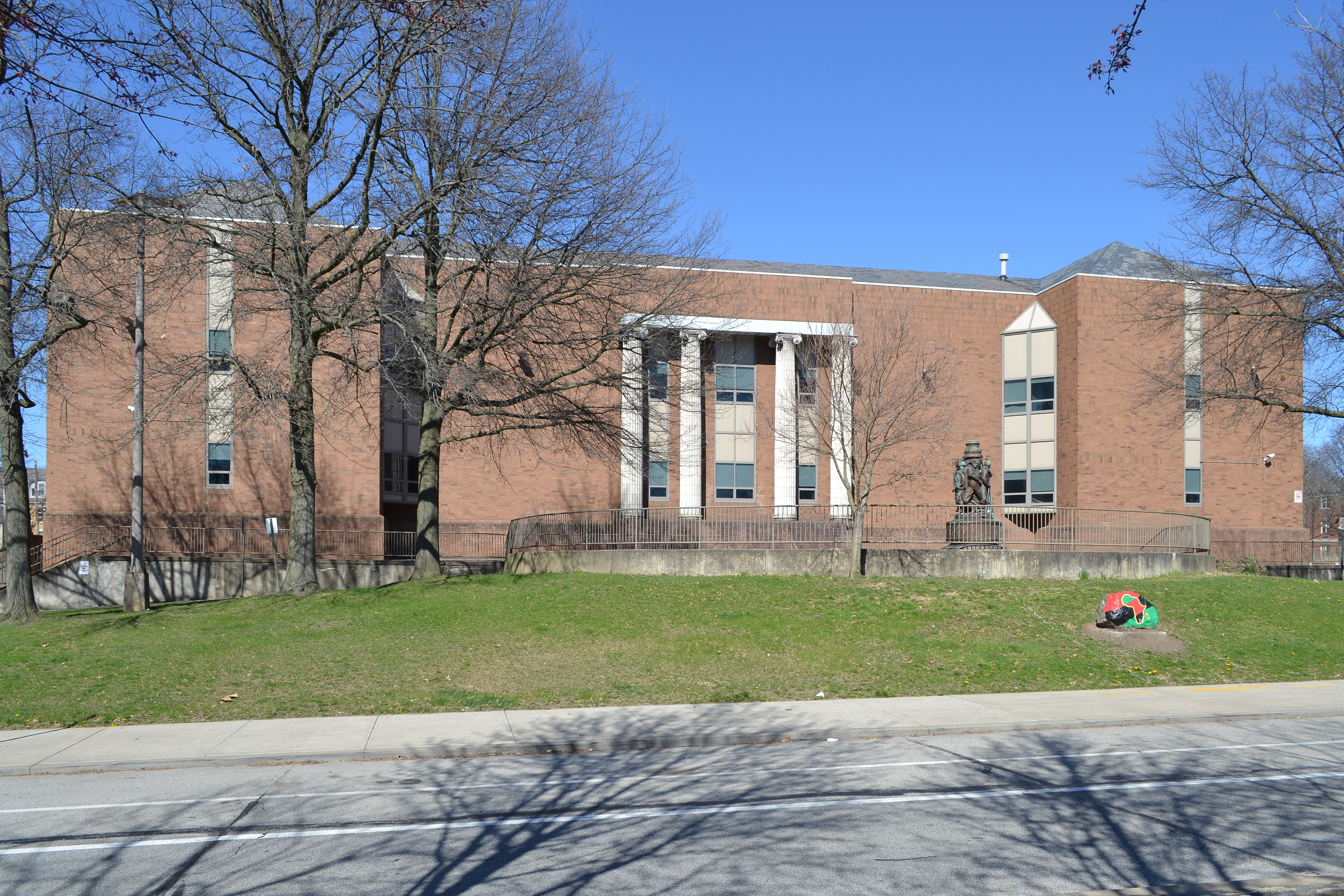
- Obama 6–12 in 2024
- 515 N. Highland Avenue; Pittsburgh, PA 15206; United States

Information
- Type: Public International Baccalaureate
- Motto: Nothing in life is so complicated, that it cannot be achieved by discipline and hard work.
- Established: 2009
- School district: Pittsburgh Public Schools
- Principal: Yalonda Colbert
- Teaching staff: 55.50 (FTE)
- Grades: 6–12
- Student to teacher ratio: 13.28
- Language: German, French, Spanish, Japanese, and Mandarin
- Colors: Purple, black and silver
- Athletics: Basketball, Soccer, Football, Baseball, Softball, Volleyball, Track and Field, Swimming, Cross Country, Tennis, Golf, Ultimate Frisbee, Wrestling
- Mascot: Eagles
- Newspaper: The Eagle Times
- Website: www.pghschools.org/schools/6-12/obama

The Barack Obama Academy of International Studies, also known as Pittsburgh Obama 6–12, is a public school in the East Liberty neighborhood of Pittsburgh, Pennsylvania. The school is named in honor of Former President Barack Obama who served as 44th President of the United States.

Pittsburgh Obama is an International Baccalaureate school which was created when the Pittsburgh Public Schools combined Frick Middle School and Schenley High School. As of the 2017–2018 school year, Pittsburgh Obama is located in the former Peabody High School building. Before that, it was housed in the former Reizenstein Middle School building for three years.

The school is noted for its heavy involvement in the Pennsylvania YMCA Youth and Government program.

== Enrollment ==
As of October 1, 2018:

Group	Number of students	Percent
All	924	100%
White	183	19.81%
African American	648	70.13%
Asian	14	1.52%
Hispanic	17	1.84%
Multiracial	60	6.49%
American Indian	<5	0.21%
Male	376	40.69%
Female	548	59.31%
