= Dave Kalina =

American football player (born 1947)

No. 84
- Position: Wide receiver

Personal information
- Born: September 2, 1947 (age 79); Braddock, Pennsylvania, U.S.
- Listed height: 6 ft 3 in (1.91 m)
- Listed weight: 200 lb (91 kg)

Career information
- High school: Westinghouse (PA)
- College: Miami
- NFL draft: 1970: undrafted

Career history
- Pittsburgh Steelers (1970–1971)

Career NFL statistics
- Games played: 2
- Stats at Pro Football Reference

Dave Kalina (born September 2, 1947) is an American former professional football player. He was a wide receiver for two season with the Pittsburgh Steelers of the National Football League (NFL). He played college football for the Miami Hurricanes.
