= Bob Smizik =

American journalist

Bob Smizik is a former sportswriter and columnist for the Pittsburgh Post-Gazette. Smizik retired in December 2008, accepting a buyout from the Post-Gazette in mid-December 2008, stepping away from his duties as a full-time columnist for the paper. after his retirement from print journalism, he covered Pittsburgh and national sports topics on a locally popular internet blog hosted at the Post-Gazette's website until October 14, 2015, when he announced that his writing days were behind him in a final article.

Smizik was originally hired by the Pittsburgh Press in June 1969 and was a beat reporter for both the Pittsburgh Pirates, 1972–77 and the Pitt football and basketball, 1978-82 during the first few decades of his career. He became a columnist in 1983. He is a native of Pittsburgh and graduated from Peabody High School and the University of Pittsburgh.

Smizik became popular in the 1990s for his appearances on many Pittsburgh sports shows, including Sportsbeat.
