= Point Breeze, Pittsburgh =

Point Breeze
- Neighborhood of Pittsburgh
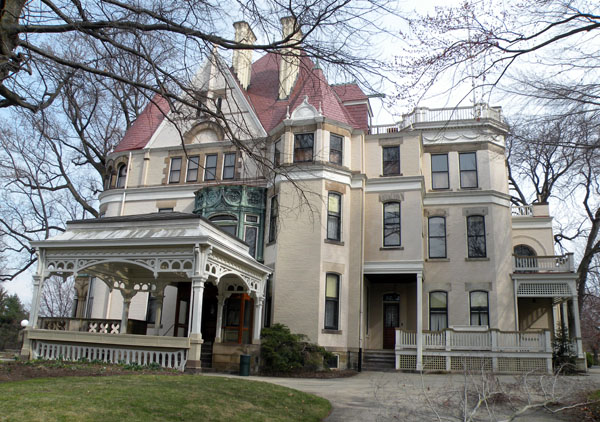
- Henry Clay Frick's "Clayton"

- Coordinates: 40.449°N 79.910°W
- Country: United States
- State: Pennsylvania
- County: Allegheny County
- City: Pittsburgh

Area
  - Total: 1.004 sq mi (2.60 km^{2})

Population (2010)
  - Total: 5,315
  - Density: 5,294/sq mi (2,044/km^{2})

Point Breeze, or South Point Breeze, is a largely residential neighborhood in Pittsburgh, Pennsylvania, United States. The community was named after a tavern once located there.

Like nearby Squirrel Hill, it contains a large Jewish population, but is still majority Catholic and contributes to a high percentage of students enrolled in Taylor Allderdice High School, Oakland Catholic High School, and Central Catholic High School.

The most prominent feature of Point Breeze is Henry Clay Frick's Clayton, which is a part of the 5.5-acre (2.2 ha) Frick Art & Historical Center. Nearby is St. Bede School, a Catholic school, and the Pittsburgh New Church School. It is also the home to two Pittsburgh Public Schools, Linden Academy elementary school and Sterrett Middle School, and the Reformed Presbyterian Theological Seminary. The neighborhood also hosts much open space, with Westinghouse Park, Mellon Park, the scenic Homewood Cemetery, as well as the northern edge of Frick Park within its borders.

Pulitzer Prize winner Annie Dillard's popular memoir, An American Childhood, is set in Point Breeze during the 1950s. As a child she attended Park Place Elementary. Both of John Edgar Wideman's memoirs, Brothers and Keepers and Hoop Roots, use North Point Breeze's Westinghouse Park as a setting, as well as in his fictional Homewood Trilogy.

Although officially distinct neighborhoods separated by Penn Avenue, "Point Breeze" is also frequently taken to include North Point Breeze.

== Surrounding neighborhoods ==
Point Breeze has six borders, five with the Pittsburgh neighborhoods of North Point Breeze to the north, Regent Square to the southeast, Squirrel Hill South to the south and southwest, Squirrel Hill North to the west, and Shadyside to the northwest. The other border is with the borough of Wilkinsburg to the east. Point Breeze also runs catty-corner (without a direct border) with the Pittsburgh neighborhood of Larimer to the north at the intersection of Penn and Fifth Avenues (This intersection also serves as an east–west "diagonal" for the Pittsburgh neighborhoods of Shadyside and North Point Breeze).

== Park Place ==
The eastern edge of the neighborhood, north of Regent Square and east of Frick Park, comprises the neighborhood of Park Place. The Shady Side Academy Junior School sits here, as does Environmental Charter School, a Pittsburgh Public School that operates as a charter school in the building originally known as Park Place School.

== Notable residents ==
- Malcolm James McCormick (January 19, 1992 – September 7, 2018), known professionally as Mac Miller.
- Jesse Andrews (born September 15, 1982), novelist and screenwriter.
- David McCullough (July 7, 1933 – August 7, 2022), noted historian and author, two-time winner of the Pulitzer Prize, was born and raised in Point Breeze.

== See also ==
- List of Pittsburgh neighborhoods

== Gallery ==
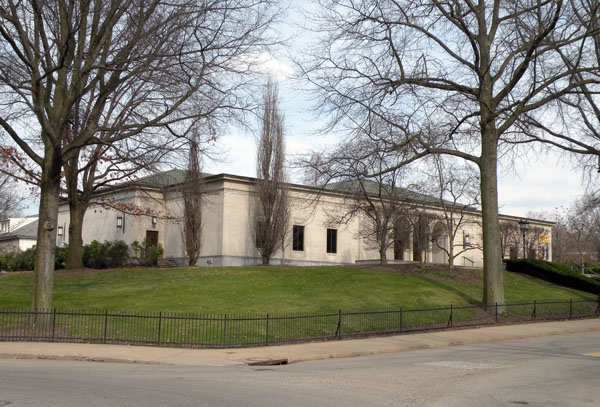
The Frick Art Museum, part of the Frick Art & Historical Center at "Clayton".

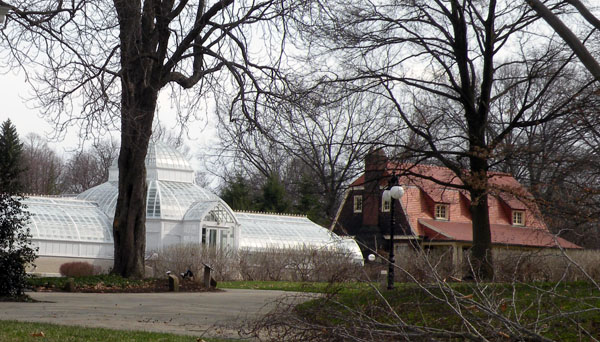
The greenhouse at the Frick Art & Historical Center.

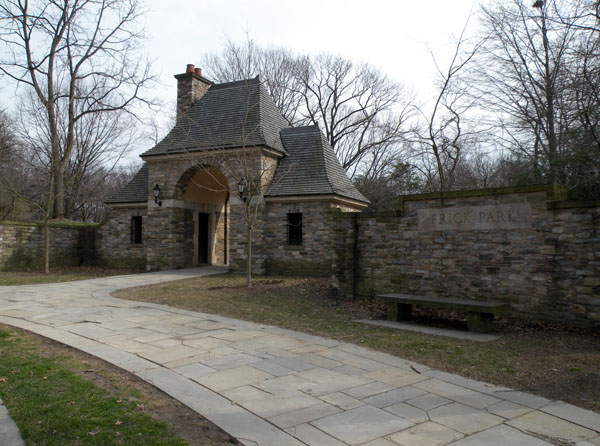
The Frick Park gate near the corner of Reynolds Street and S. Homewood Avenue.

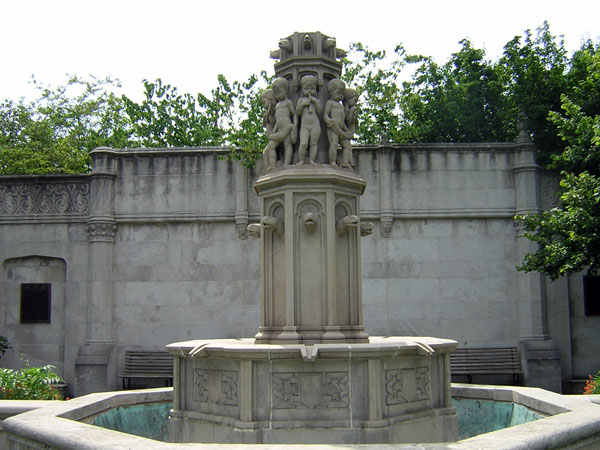
Mellon Park, established in 1943 (gardens designed in 1912), at the corner of Fifth and Shady Avenues.

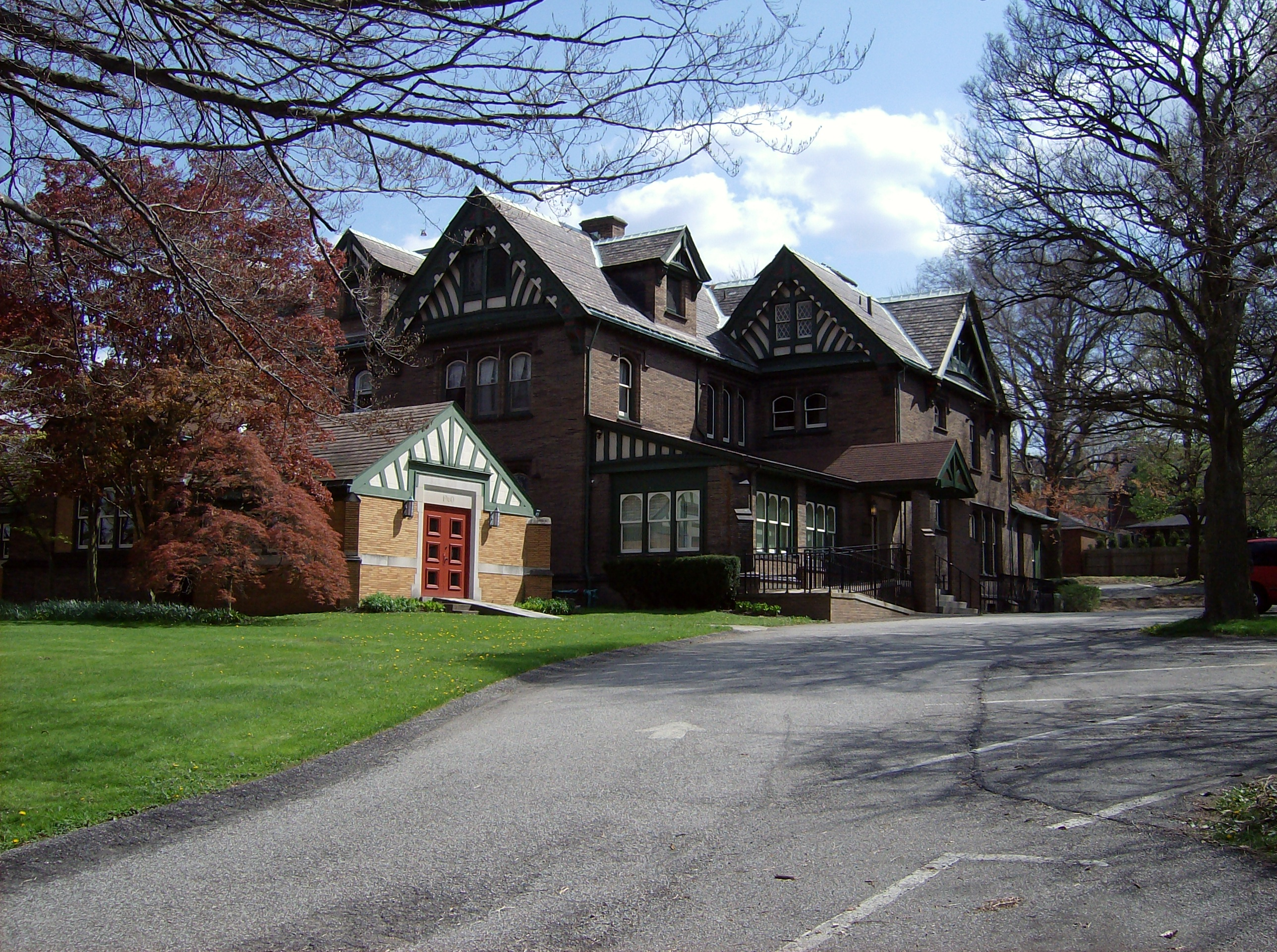
The Reformed Presbyterian Theological Seminary is located on Penn Avenue.
