= Tony Liscio =

American football player (1940–2017)

No. 72, 64
- Positions: Tackle, Guard

Personal information
- Born: July 2, 1940; Pittsburgh, Pennsylvania, U.S.
- Died: June 18, 2017 (aged 76); Lake Highlands, Dallas, Texas, U.S.
- Listed height: 6 ft 5 in (1.96 m)
- Listed weight: 264 lb (120 kg)

Career information
- High school: Westinghouse (PA)
- College: Tulsa (1959–1962)
- NFL draft: 1963: 3rd round, 42nd overall pick
- AFL draft: 1963: 10th round, 75th overall pick

Career history
- Green Bay Packers (1963)*; Dallas Cowboys (1963–1970); San Diego Chargers (1971)*; Dallas Cowboys (1971)
- * Offseason or practice squad member only

Awards and highlights
- Super Bowl champion (VI); Second-team All-Pro (1966); All-Missouri Valley Conference (1962)

Career NFL statistics
- Games played: 89
- Games started: 83
- Fumble recoveries: 3
- Stats at Pro Football Reference

Anthony Liscio (July 2, 1940 – June 18, 2017) was an American professional football offensive tackle in the National Football League (NFL) for the Dallas Cowboys. He played college football at the University of Tulsa.

== Early life ==
Liscio attended Westinghouse High School, where he was an All-state end in football, the starting center in basketball and a shot putter for the track and field team.

He was inducted into the Westinghouse High School Wall of Fame. In 2015, he was inducted into the Pittsburgh City League Hall of Fame.

== College career ==
Liscio accepted a football scholarship from the University of Tulsa. He was a two-way starting tackle.

As a senior, he was moved to defensive end and was named All-Missouri Valley Conference, honorable-mention All-American and was invited to play in the College All-Star Game against the NFL champion.

In 2004, he was inducted into the University of Tulsa Athletics Hall of Fame.

== Professional career ==
=== Green Bay Packers ===
Liscio was selected by the Green Bay Packers in the third round (42nd overall) of the 1963 NFL draft. He was also drafted by the New York Jets in the tenth round (75th overall) of the 1963 AFL draft.

He signed with the Packers, and during training camp he was used as a defensive end and defensive tackle. He was eventually released the week of the season opener on September 10.

=== Dallas Cowboys (first stint) ===
In September 1967, Liscio was signed by the Dallas Cowboys to their taxi squad, where he was switched to the offensive line. He was named the starter at left tackle (five starts) at the end of his rookie season, becoming the second player in franchise history to hold this position after replacing Bob Fry.

In 1964, Liscio started 10 games before being placed on the injured reserve list with a right knee injury. He lost all of the 1965 season, after suffering complications (staph infection) from the knee surgery he had in the offseason.

In 1966, he recovered to resume his career, was named the starting left guard (10 starts), and eventually moved back to left tackle (four starts) at the end of the season. He received second-team All-Pro honors and was voted second to Dick Bass for the NFL Comeback Player of the Year Award.

In 1967, he was the starter at left tackle and played in the championship game, famously known as the "Ice Bowl".

In 1970, he appeared in 11 games with 7 starts. Liscio began the season as the starter at left tackle, before suffering a back injury in the fifth game against the Minnesota Vikings. He was replaced by Ralph Neely, who would remain the starter at left tackle for the following years.

During his first eight seasons, Liscio was a starter on an offensive line that helped Dallas reach two NFC Championships and one Super Bowl, while playing in 84 games, many of them with injuries.

On May 19, 1971, he was sent to the San Diego Chargers as part of the “Bambi” trade that brought Hall of Famer Lance Alworth to the Cowboys.

=== San Diego Chargers ===
Liscio never played a game for the Chargers because of injuries to his back and hamstrings. On September 8, 1971, he was traded to the Miami Dolphins along with a fourth round draft choice (#91-Larry Ball) in exchange for center Carl Mauck.

He never played a game for the Miami Dolphins either, because he announced his retirement after the trade became official, rather than reporting to the team.

=== Dallas Cowboys (second stint) ===
In 1971, head coach Tom Landry called Liscio on Monday November 15 to ask if he could return to the Cowboys to replace the injured Neely, Forrest Gregg and Don Talbert. He reported to the team on Wednesday to start at left tackle against the Washington Redskins on Sunday. During the game, Liscio played with injuries to his shoulders and knees. Liscio and the Cowboys won the game 13–0 and became the leader in the NFC East.

He started the last 5 games of the regular season and the playoffs at left tackle. At Super Bowl VI, the Cowboys defeated Miami 24–3. In that game, Liscio successfully blocked Bill Stanfill, helping Duane Thomas and other running backs register 252 rushing yards. He retired at the end of the year.

== Personal life ==
After football, he worked in commercial real estate. In 2012, he suffered a heart attack while being present at the Dallas Cowboys training camp.

Liscio died on June 18, 2017, at age 76 at his Lake Highlands home. He was diagnosed with amyotrophic lateral sclerosis after falling and breaking his hip in mid-2016 and began slurring his words. He had lost his ability to speak and required a feeding tube, according to his wife, Annette, to whom he was married since 1963. She believed playing football had contributed to his condition and, upon his death, donated his brain to be tested for chronic traumatic encephalopathy. He was survived by her and their three children.
