= Park Place School =

- U.S. National Register of Historic Places
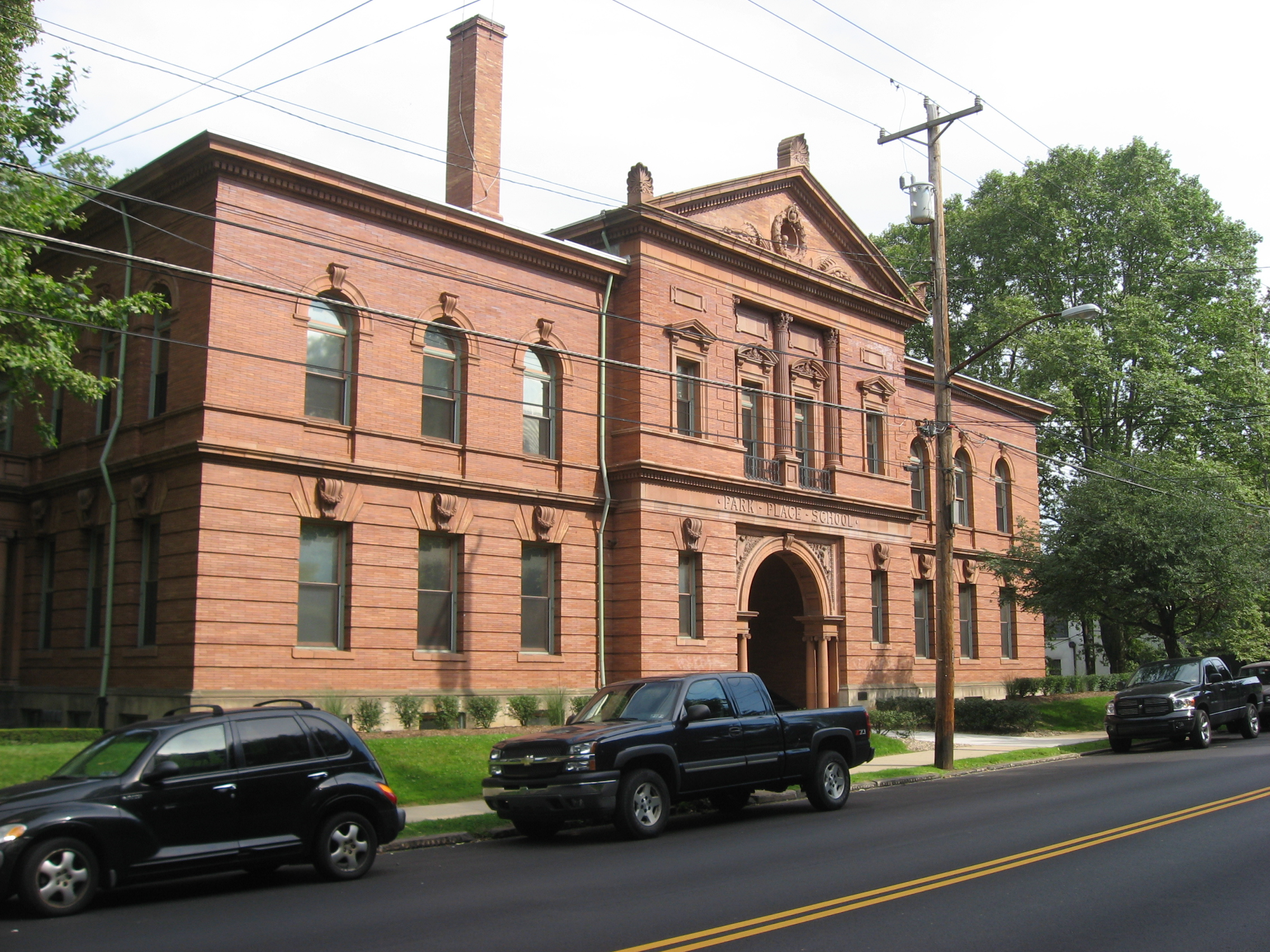

- Location within Pittsburgh Location within Pennsylvania Location within the United States
- Location: 301 S. Braddock Ave., Pittsburgh, Pennsylvania 15221
- Coordinates: 40°26′42″N 79°53′45″W
- Area: 1 acre (0.40 ha)
- Built: 1903
- Architect: Dean, Ellsworth; Wilson, A. & S., Co.
- Architectural style: Late 19th And 20th Century Revivals, Second Renaissance Revival
- MPS: Pittsburgh Public Schools TR
- NRHP reference No.: 86002701
- Added to NRHP: September 30, 1986

The Park Place School is a former elementary school in the Point Breeze neighborhood of Pittsburgh, Pennsylvania. It was built in 1903 at the then-extravagant cost of $100,000, with 9 classrooms and a basement play area.

The school closed in 1979 and was listed on the National Register of Historic Places in 1986. Later, it briefly functioned as an apartment building. It currently houses the Primary K-2 Campus of the Environmental Charter School.

== See also ==
- Linden Avenue School
