= Beechwood Elementary School =

- U.S. National Register of Historic Places
- Pittsburgh Landmark – PHLF
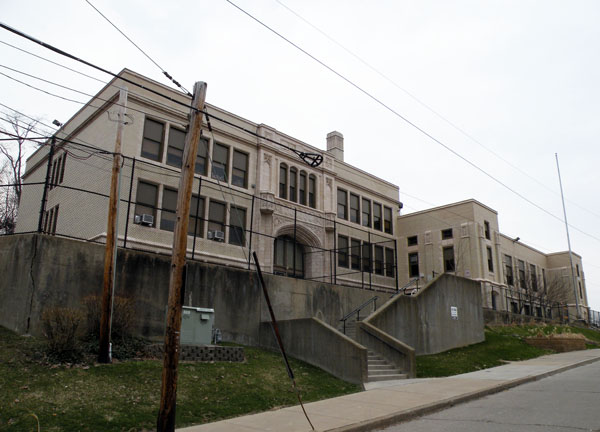

- Location within Pittsburgh Location within Pennsylvania Location within the United States
- Location: 810 Rockland Ave., Pittsburgh, Pennsylvania
- Coordinates: 40°24′52″N 80°1′15″W
- Area: 2 acres (0.81 ha)
- Built: 1908, added to in 1923
- Architects: Press C. Dowler, Willaims & Hass Co.
- Architectural style: Tudor Revival
- Website: Beechwood Elementary School
- MPS: Pittsburgh Public Schools TR
- NRHP reference No.: 86002656

Significant dates
- Added to NRHP: September 30, 1986
- Designated PHLF: 2002

The Beechwood Elementary School is a midsized, urban, public school located in the Beechview neighborhood of Pittsburgh, Pennsylvania. The building was built in 1908. It was listed on the National Register of Historic Places in 1986. The school provides taxpayer funded preschool through 5th grade. Enrollment was 333 in 2018. The school is part of the Pittsburgh School District.
