= Mose Lantz =

American football player (1903–1969)

No. 32
- Positions: Center, middle guard

Personal information
- Born: November 24, 1903; Pittsburgh, Pennsylvania, U.S.
- Died: November 2, 1969 (aged 65); Pittsburgh, Pennsylvania, U.S.
- Listed height: 5 ft 11 in (1.80 m)
- Listed weight: 185 lb (84 kg)

Career information
- High school: Westinghouse (Pittsburgh)
- College: Grove City (1926–1929)

Career history
- Pittsburgh Pirates (1933)
- Stats at Pro Football Reference

Montgomery Stoffal Lantz (November 24, 1903 – November 2, 1969) was an American professional football center who played one season with the Pittsburgh Pirates of the National Football League (NFL). He played college football at Grove City College.

== Early life and college ==
Montgomery Stoffal Lantz was born on November 24, 1903, in Pittsburgh, Pennsylvania. He attended Westinghouse High School in Pittsburgh.

Lantz was a member of the Grove City Wolverines of Grove City College from 1926 to 1929.

== Professional career ==
Lantz signed with the Pittsburgh Pirates of the National Football League in 1933. He appeared in ten games for the Pirates during the team's inaugural 1933 season, playing center on offense and middle guard on defense. He wore jersey number 32 while with the Pirates. Lantz stood 5'11" and weighed 185 pounds.

== Personal life ==
Lantz died on November 2, 1969, in Pittsburgh, Pennsylvania.
