= Marie S. Klooz =

American lawyer (1901–2002)

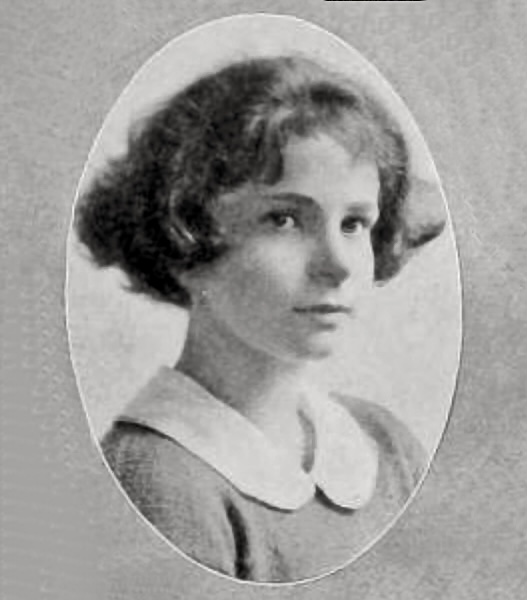
- Marie Klooz, from the 1922 Sweet Briar College yearbook
- Born: Marie Stuart Klooz; December 29, 1901; Louisville, Kentucky, U.S.
- Died: December 29, 2002 (aged 101); Sandy Spring, Maryland, U.S.
- Occupation: Lawyer

Marie Stuart Klooz (December 29, 1901 – December 29, 2002) was an American settlement worker, lawyer, law librarian, and pacifist.

== Early life and education ==
Klooz was born in Louisville, Kentucky and raised in Pittsburgh, Pennsylvania, the daughter of L. Fred Klooz and Sankie Hudson Klooz. Her father was a hotelkeeper. She graduated from Peabody High School in 1919, and completed a bachelor's degree at Sweet Briar College in Virginia in 1923. She earned a teaching certificate at the University of Pittsburgh, and a master's degree in International Law and International Relations at Columbia University. In 1960 she finished law school at George Washington University.

== Career ==
After college Klooz moved to Chicago, where she worked at the University of Chicago settlement house, teaching English. She was a sports writer for a Philadelphia newspaper in the 1920s, and a reporter for the Pittsburgh Post-Gazette. In 1933, while working for Herbert Yardley, she assembled a report on "Japanese Diplomatic Secrets", considered so hazardous that the manuscript was seized by the United States government as a violation of the Espionage Act of 1917.

In 1941, she was part of discussion on defense policy at the Academy of Political Science. During World War II she worked in Washington, D.C. in various federal government departments. Klooz became a pacifist and a Quaker during World War II. She published an academic article on the United Nations in 1949. She worked as a researcher for the American Friends Service Committee and the Women's International League for Peace and Freedom (WILPF) in the 1950s. She represented the WILPF at a 1960 Senate hearing on the International Court of Justice.

Klooz passed the bar in 1961, and was a law librarian for the American Society of International Law. In 1963, she filed an amicus brief in the case of Linus C. Pauling v. Robert S. McNamara, on behalf of several pacifist and anti-nuclear organizations. From 1965 she was staff attorney for Neighborhood Legal Services. In 1965 she spoke at a memorial service for fellow Quaker Norman Morrison, who died in an act of protest by self-immolation near the Pentagon. She was active in the ACLU, and in supporting conscientious objectors during the Vietnam War. She had a private law practice in Rockville, Maryland until she retired in 1976.

== Personal life ==
Klooz lived in Sandy Spring, Maryland in her later years. She died in 2002, on her 101st birthday, at a Friends nursing home. Her 1933 report on Japanese diplomatic secrets was retrieved from government files and published as a CD in 2001.
