= John Morrow Elementary School =

- U.S. National Register of Historic Places
- Pittsburgh Landmark – PHLF
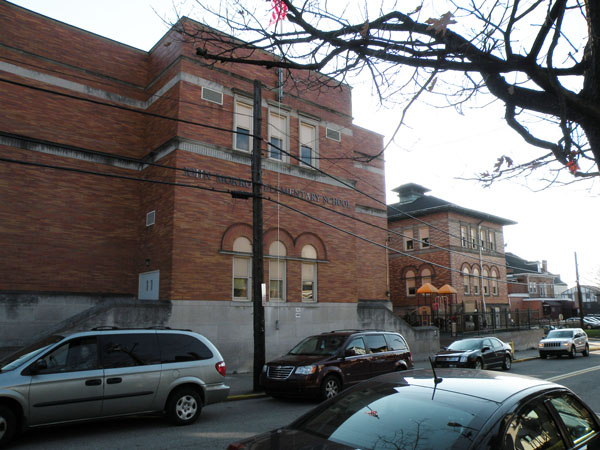

- Location within Pittsburgh Location within Pennsylvania Location within the United States
- Location: 1611 Davis Avenue (Brighton Heights), Pittsburgh, Pennsylvania, USA
- Coordinates: 40°28′48.14″N 80°2′23.28″W
- Built: 1895, with additions in 1922
- Architect: Samuel Thornburg McClarren
- Architectural style: Renaissance Revival
- Website: Morrow Elementary School
- MPS: Pittsburgh Public Schools TR
- NRHP reference No.: 86002693

Significant dates
- Added to NRHP: September 30, 1986
- Designated PHLF: 2002

The John Morrow Elementary School (also known as the K-5 campus of Pittsburgh Morrow PreK–8) is a public elementary school located at 1611 Davis Avenue in the Brighton Heights neighborhood of Pittsburgh, Pennsylvania.

== History and architectural features ==
Built in 1895, this historic structure was expanded with additions in later years, including during 1922.

The building was designed by Samuel Thornburg McClarren (1862–1940), who also designed the Woolslair Elementary School in Bloomfield.

It was added to the National Register of Historic Places on September 30, 1986, and the List of Pittsburgh History and Landmarks Foundation Historic Landmarks in 2002.
