= Burton Tansky =

American department store executive (1937–2025)

- Born: Burton Marvin Tansky; November 30, 1937; Pittsburgh, Pennsylvania, U.S.
- Died: March 16, 2025 (aged 87); Palm Beach Gardens, Florida, U.S.
- Occupation: Retail executive
- Employers: Saks Fifth Avenue; Bergdorf Goodman; Neiman Marcus
- Spouse: Rita Tansky (m. 1958)
- Children: 2

Burton M. Tansky (November 30, 1937 – March 16, 2025) was an American department store executive who held leadership roles at Saks Fifth Avenue, Bergdoff Goodman, and most-notably The Neiman Marcus Group where he retired as president and chief executive officer in the summer of 2010. Throughout his career he was known in the retail industry as "Mr. Luxury."

== Early life and education ==
Burton Tansky was born on November 30, 1937, to Harry and Jeannette Tansky, who, fleeing religious persecution, immigrated to Pittsburgh from Poland and Russia respectively in the early 20th century. The couple operated a hair salon in the fashionable William Penn Hotel in Downtown Pittsburgh. They raised three children, Burt, Shirley, and Eva, in the neighborhood of East Liberty. Burton was a graduate of Peabody High School.

Tansky's first job was delivering newspapers at age 12, followed by a number of odd jobs through his teenage years, including as a clerk at a grocery store, and selling shoes at Kaufmann’s, the local department store. He graduated from the University of Pittsburgh, where he majored in history and minored in economics. Shortly after graduating, he married his high school sweetheart, Rita.

== Career ==
After graduating from the University of Pittsburgh with a degree in History, Tansky attended a six-week training program at Kaufmann's, where he learned different aspects of the business. In 1965, he became a buyer for women's clothes and small leather goods at Kauffman's. Tansky then moved to Filene's (in Boston), where he was a store manager. He then became a divisional merchandise manager at Rike's (in Dayton, Ohio). He was then hired as a general merchandise manager at I. Magnin (in San Francisco), where he received his first experience in a luxury store.

In 1974, Tansky became General Merchandise Manager at Saks Fifth Avenue (in New York City). He became executive vice president of Saks in 1979 and President in 1980–1990. He then became chief executive officer of Bergdorf Goodman.

In 1998, Tansky became COO of Neiman Marcus Group in Dallas, which also owns Bergdorf's. He was later named CEO in 2001. While at Neiman's Tansky helped the store attain the industry's highest productivity rates at more than $500 in sales per square foot. During his tenure the company also expanded from 24 to 41 stores. Tansky was also an early advocate for e-commerce, launching the company's retail website and pouring resources into it. Under his leadership Neiman Marcus reached $4.6 billion in annual sales. He retired in 2010.

== Death ==
Tansky died in Palm Beach Gardens, Florida, on March 16, 2025, at the age of 87.

== Awards and honors ==
In 2002, Tansky was appointed a Chevalier de la Legion d'Honneur by the French government for his promotion of French-made merchandise in America and in 2004 he was awarded the Gold Medal Award from the National Retail Federation. Tansky was accorded the Superstar Award from Fashion Group International in 2006, a Visionaries! Award in 2005 from the Museum of Arts and Design, and was also honored for his work with the National Alliance for Autism Research (NAAR). In 2013, the University of Pittsburgh appointed him a lifetime emeritus trustee.

== Sources ==
- Joyce Gannon (2007). Pittsburgh Post-Gazette: Profile of Burton Tansky. Retrieved November 18, 2007.
- Maria Halkias (2010). Dallas News: Neiman Marcus' Burton Tansky is retiring as CEO. Retrieved May 6, 2026.
