= Eva Tansky Blum =

American lawyer

Eva Tansky Blum is an American lawyer. She is the chair of the University of Pittsburgh Board of Trustees.

== Biography ==
Blum worked at the United States Department of Commerce in Washington before returning to her home town of Pittsburgh, where she started in PNC Financial Services's legal department in 1977. Blum held numerous executive-level leadership positions during her 37-year career at PNC Bank. Blum last served as the Executive Vice President and Director of Community Affairs before retiring in March of 2015. She also served as the President of the PNC Foundation.

Blum was the president of the Pitt Alumni Association of the University of Pittsburgh. She worked on the capital fund campaign, and chaired the student affairs committee and the national search committee for a new chancellor in 2014.

In 2015, Blum was elected chair of the University of Pittsburgh Board of Trustees. She is the first woman in the university's history to hold this position.
