= McKelvy =

McKelvy is a surname. Notable people with the surname include:

- Frank R. McKelvy (1914–1980), American set decorator
- Russ McKelvy (1854–1915), American baseball player
- William N. McKelvy Sr. (1869–1933), United States Marine Corps officer

== See also ==
- Miesha McKelvy-Jones (born 1976), American hurdler
