= Woolslair Elementary School =

- U.S. National Register of Historic Places
- City of Pittsburgh Historic Structure
- Pittsburgh Landmark – PHLF
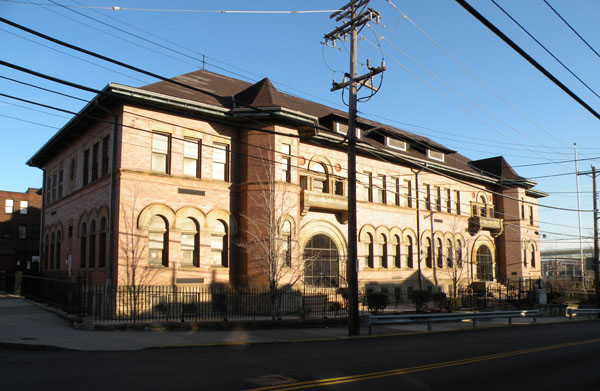

- Location within Pittsburgh Location within Pennsylvania Location within the United States
- Location: 501 40th St., Pittsburgh, Pennsylvania
- Coordinates: 40°27′48″N 79°57′25″W
- Area: 1 acre (0.40 ha)
- Built: 1897–98
- Architect: Samuel Thornburg McClarren
- Architectural style: Romanesque
- Website: Woolslair Elementary School
- MPS: Pittsburgh Public Schools TR
- NRHP reference No.: 86002718

Significant dates
- Added to NRHP: September 30, 1986
- Designated CPHS: November 30, 1999
- Designated PHLF: 2001

The Woolslair Elementary School (also known as Pittsburgh Woolslair PK-5) is a public elementary school in the Bloomfield neighborhood of Pittsburgh, Pennsylvania. It was built in 1898. It was listed on the National Register of Historic Places in 1986. It currently hosts Pittsburgh Woolslair, a pre-K through fifth grade public school, and its STEAM magnet program.

== History ==
The Woolslair School was built in 1897–98 by the Howard Sub-District, which was the local school board for the 16th Ward (covering parts of present-day Bloomfield and Lower Lawrenceville). Construction began in September, 1897, and the completed building was dedicated on January 6, 1899. The $70,000 building was called the "pride of the 16th Ward". The Pittsburgh Press reported,

...the building is unique in its arrangement of class rooms, its acoustics, its sanitary arrangements, as also in its manner of lighting and heating. As a matter of fact, there is not a single dark corner in any of the rooms, for passages and the ventilation is of the very best.

The school remains in operation as Pittsburgh Public Schools Woolslair K-5 as of 2026, serving pre-K through 5th grades and hosting a STEAM magnet program. It is one of the oldest schools in the district.

== Architecture ==
The Woolslair School is a two-story building constructed from brown brick with sandstone trim. The building consists of a rectangular front section and a T-shaped rear with a complex intersecting hipped roof. The front elevation is symmetrical, with two entrance bays and two projecting polygonal turrets. Each entrance bay has an arched doorway on the first floor and a Palladian window with a small balcony on the second floor. There are eight windows, arranged in groups of four, between the two entrance bays, and three more windows to the outside of each turret. The windows are arched on the first floor and rectangular on the second floor.

In its original configuration, the school had 16 classrooms and a 950-seat auditorium which could be accessed from both the first and second floors, which was an unusual feature. The building was designed by Samuel Thornburg McClarren (1862–1940), who also designed the John Morrow Elementary School in Brighton Heights.
