= Clay v. United States =

- Supreme Court of the United States

Argued April 19, 1971 Decided June 28, 1971
- Full case name: Cassius Marsellus Clay, Jr. [sic] also known as Muhammad Ali v. United States
- Citations: 403 U.S. 698 (more) 91 S. Ct. 2068; 29 L. Ed. 2d 810

Case history
- Prior: Conviction affirmed, 397 F.2d 901 (5th Cir. 1968); remanded sub. nom., Giordano v. United States, 394 U.S. 310 (1969); conviction affirmed again, 430 F.2d 165 (5th Cir. 1970).

Holding
- Since the Appeal Board gave no reason for the denial of a conscientious objector exemption to petitioner, and it is impossible to determine on which of the three grounds offered in the Justice Department's letter that board relied, petitioner's conviction must be reversed.

Court membership
- Chief Justice Warren E. Burger Associate Justices Hugo Black · William O. Douglas; John M. Harlan II · William J. Brennan Jr. Potter Stewart · Byron White; Thurgood Marshall · Harry Blackmun

Case opinions
- Per curiam
- Concurrence: Douglas
- Concurrence: Harlan (in result)
- Marshall took no part in the consideration or decision of the case.

Clay v. United States, 403 U.S. 698 (1971), was Muhammad Ali's (Note: The petitioner changed his name to "Muhammad Ali" for religious reasons. "Cassius Clay" was his birth name and that was the name under which he was called for induction and later prosecuted.) appeal of his conviction in 1967 for refusing to report for induction into the United States military forces during the Vietnam War. His local draft board had rejected his application for conscientious objector classification. In a unanimous 8–0 ruling (Thurgood Marshall recused himself due to his previous involvement in the case as a U.S. Department of Justice official), the United States Supreme Court reversed the conviction that had been upheld by the Fifth Circuit.

The Supreme Court found the government had failed to properly specify why Ali's application had been denied, thereby requiring the conviction to be overturned: "the court said the record shows that [Ali's] beliefs are founded on tenets of the Muslim religion as he understands them."

== Background ==
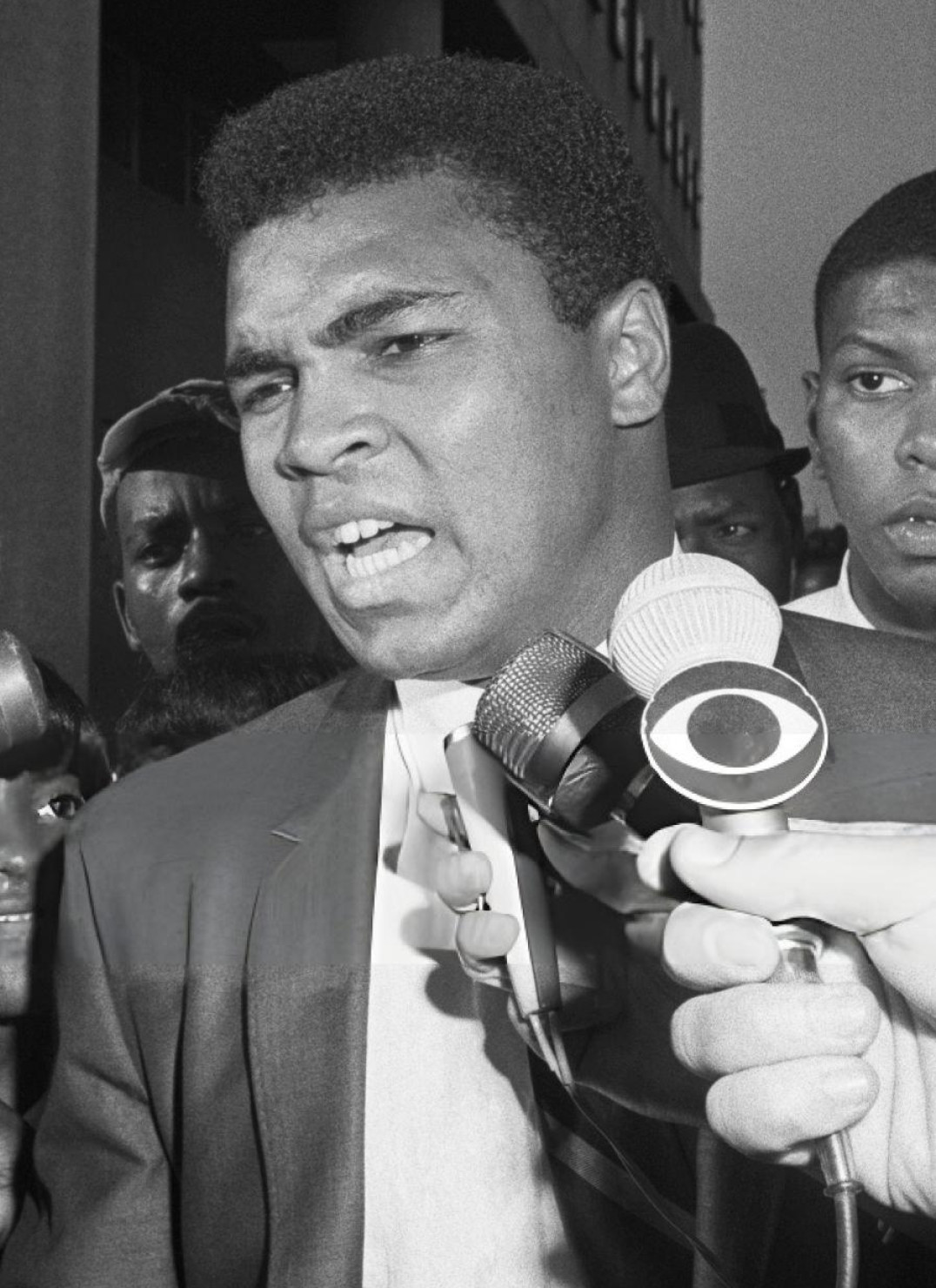
Ali leaving court in June 1967

In 1964, Ali failed the U.S. Armed Forces qualifying test because his writing and spelling skills were sub-standard. With the escalation of the Vietnam War, the test standards were lowered in November 1965 and Ali was reclassified as 1-A in February 1966, which meant he was now eligible for the draft and induction into the U.S. Army. When notified of this status, he declared that he would refuse to serve in the U.S. Army and publicly considered himself a conscientious objector. Ali stated that "War is against the teachings of the Holy Qur'an. I'm not trying to dodge the draft. We are not supposed to take part in no wars unless declared by Allah or The Messenger [Elijah Muhammad]." He also said "We are not to be the aggressor but we will defend ourselves if attacked." Ali also famously said in 1966: "I ain't got no quarrel with them Viet Cong." and "Why should they ask me to put on a uniform and go ten thousand miles from home and drop bombs and bullets on brown people in Vietnam while so-called Negro people in Louisville are treated like dogs and denied simple human rights?"

Ali appealed his local (Louisville, Kentucky) draft board's rejection of his application for conscientious objector classification. The Justice Department, in response to the State Appeal Board's referral for an advisory recommendation, concluded, contrary to a hearing officer's recommendation, that Ali's claim should be denied, and that Ali did not meet any of the three basic tests for conscientious objector status. The Appeal Board then denied Ali's claim, but without stating its reasons.

External videos
- Conversation with Muhammad Ali, includes transcript, July 7, 1968, 28:55, American Archive of Public Broadcasting

In early 1967, Ali changed his legal residence to Houston, Texas, where his appeal to be reclassified as a Muslim minister was denied 4–0 on February 20. He appeared for his scheduled induction into the U.S. Armed Forces in Houston on April 28. As expected, he refused three times to step forward at the call of his name. An officer warned him he was committing a felony punishable by five years in prison and a fine of $10,000. Once more, Ali refused to budge when his name was called. As a result, on that same day, the New York State Athletic Commission suspended his boxing license and the World Boxing Association stripped him of his title. Other boxing commissions followed suit. He was indicted by a federal grand jury on May 8 and convicted in Houston on June 20 of the criminal offence of violating the Selective Service laws by refusing to be drafted. The trial jury was composed of six men and six women, all of whom were white. The Court of Appeals affirmed the conviction and denied an appeal on May 6, 1968.

In the U.S. Supreme Court, the government conceded the invalidity of two of the grounds for denial of Ali's claim given in its letter to the appeal board, but argued that there was factual support for the third ground.

== Opinion of the Court ==
The Supreme Court decision was handed down on June 28, 1971. The Supreme Court held that, since the appeal board gave no reason for the denial of a conscientious objector exemption to petitioner, and it was impossible to determine on which of the three grounds offered in the Justice Department's letter that board relied, Ali's conviction must be reversed. The Eugene Register-Guard, reporting on the Court's record, cited "...the boxer's beliefs 'are surely no less religiously based' than those in previous cases." The Court incorporated Welsh v. United States, in which the Court had ruled that "moral and ethical objection to war was as valid as religious objection, thus broadening the qualifications."

Bob Woodward and Scott Armstrong provide an account of the development of the decision in their 1979 book The Brethren. According to that account, Justice Marshall had recused himself because he had been U.S. Solicitor General when the case began, and the remaining eight justices initially voted 5 to 3 to uphold Ali's conviction. However, Justice John Marshall Harlan II, assigned to write the majority opinion, became convinced that Ali's claim to be a conscientious objector was sincere after reading background material on Black Muslim doctrine provided by one of his law clerks. Justice Harlan concluded that the claim by the Justice Department had been a misrepresentation. Harlan changed his vote, tying the vote at 4 to 4. A deadlock would have resulted in Ali being jailed for draft evasion and, since no opinions are published for deadlocked decisions, he would have never known why he had lost. A compromise was proposed by Justice Potter Stewart, in which Ali's conviction would be reversed, citing a technical error by the Justice Department. This gradually won unanimous assent from the eight voting justices, all of whom, with Justice Marshall's recusal, were white.

== See also ==
- Muhammad Ali's Greatest Fight, a 2013 television film about the Supreme Court's deliberations on this case
