= Career Connections Charter High School =

Coordinates: 40.4718°N 79.9592°W

Location
- 4412 Butler Street; Pittsburgh, Pennsylvania, 15201

Information
- Motto: Where Education and Careers Connect
- Established: 1999
- Closed: 2014
- Principal: Peter Simpson
- Grades: 9 through 12
- Colors: Maroon and gray
- Mascot: Coyote

Career Connections Charter High School, or CCCHS, was a charter high school in the Lawrenceville neighborhood of Pittsburgh, Pennsylvania, United States, that focused on preparing students for their careers. It used methods such as mentoring, career exploration classes, career infusion into traditional classes, and soft-skill building to educate and train students for the world of careers. The culmination of the training happens during the senior year when students have the choice to spend three days a week at an internship or be dually-enrolled at a local college.

According to former C.O.O., Dr. Brian White, at CCCHS "students are nurtured in small classes and in a safe environment emphasizing success for all. Success may be defined differently by students and families, but for all it includes graduation from high school with the necessary skills to pursue a college, post-secondary or career path."

== History ==
Career Connections Charter High School was established in 1999 under basic principles set forth by the Boys and Girls Clubs of Western Pennsylvania. Their vision was to create a 9-12 high school that would provide an educational experience that prepared students for careers upon graduation.

CCCHS grew in number from an original enrollment of 49 ninth grade students. CCCHS had 280 students in grades 9-12 before it closed in 2014 due to the Pittsburgh Public Schools refusing to renew their charter.
