= Sterrett Sub-District School =

- U.S. National Register of Historic Places
- City of Pittsburgh Historic Structure
- Pittsburgh Landmark – PHLF
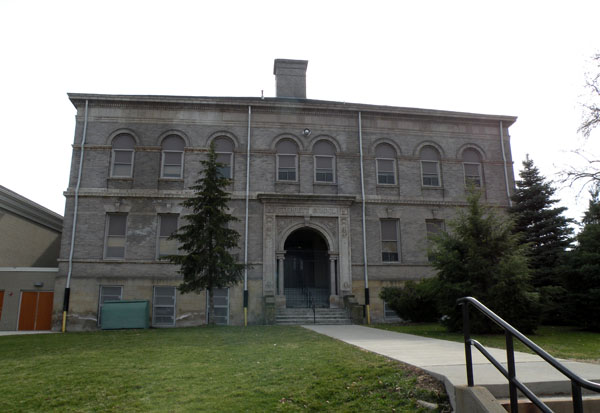

- Location within Pittsburgh Location within Pennsylvania Location within the United States
- Location: 339 Lang Ave., Pittsburgh, Pennsylvania
- Coordinates: 40°26′47″N 79°54′21″W
- Area: 1 acre (0.40 ha)
- Built: 1898
- Architect: Carlisle, Edward J.
- Architectural style: Late 19th And 20th Century Revivals, Second Renaissance Revival
- Website: Sterrett School
- MPS: Pittsburgh Public Schools TR
- NRHP reference No.: 86002713

Significant dates
- Added to NRHP: September 30, 1986
- Designated CPHS: November 30, 1999
- Designated PHLF: 2001

The Sterrett Sub-District School (also known as Pittsburgh Sterrett 6-8) in the Point Breeze neighborhood of Pittsburgh, Pennsylvania, is a building from 1898. It was listed on the National Register of Historic Places in 1986. It currently contains Pittsburgh Sterrett 6-8 and its Classical Academy magnet program.
