= Linden Avenue School =

- U.S. National Register of Historic Places
- Pittsburgh Landmark – PHLF
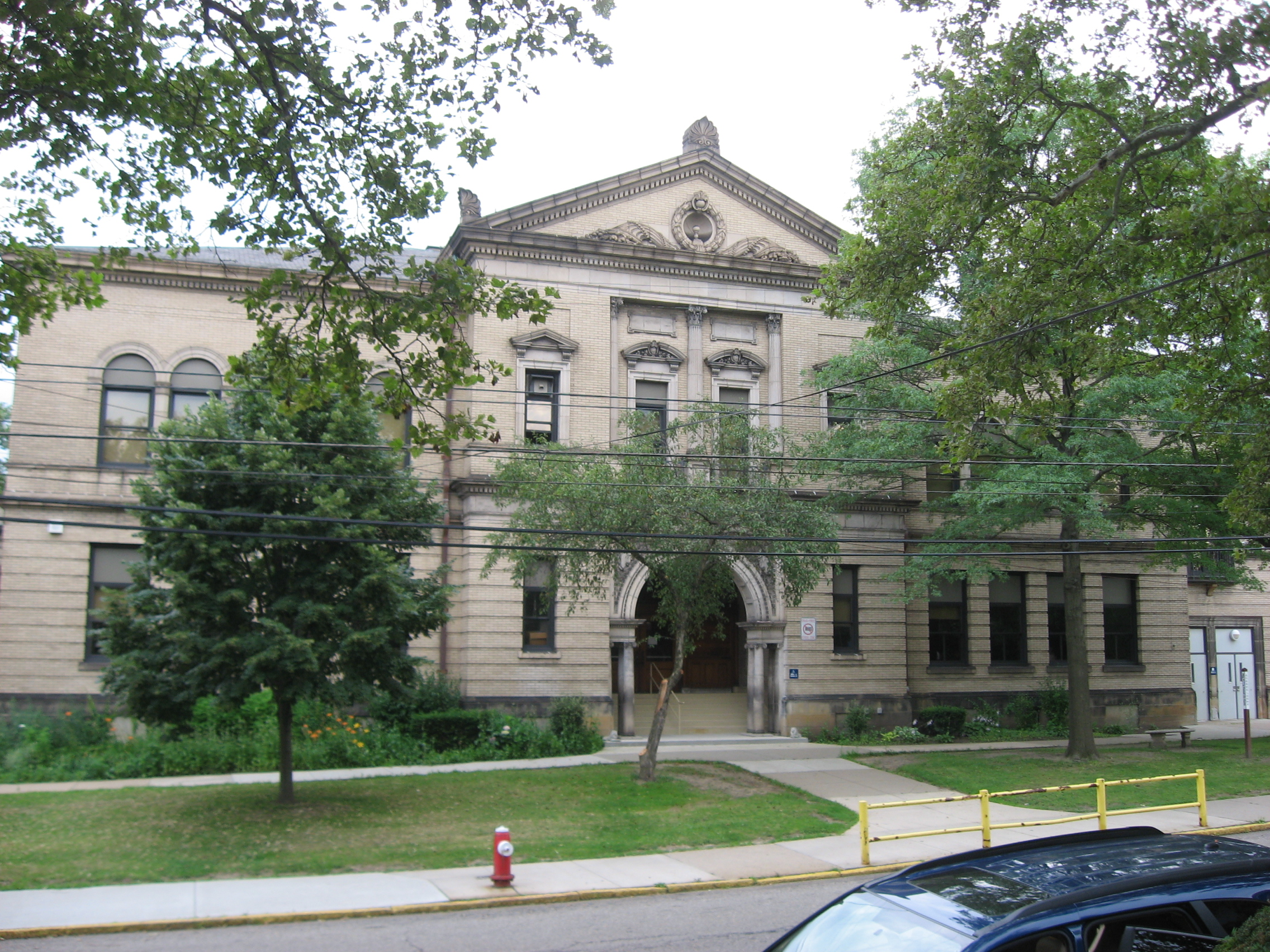

- Location within Pittsburgh Location within Pennsylvania Location within the United States
- Location: 739 S. Linden Ave., Pittsburgh, Pennsylvania
- Coordinates: 40°26′44″N 79°54′59″W
- Area: 1 acre (0.40 ha)
- Built: 1903
- Architect: Dean, Ellsworth; Pringle & Robling
- Architectural style: Late 19th And 20th Century Revivals, Second Renaissance Revival
- Website: Linden Avenue School
- MPS: Pittsburgh Public Schools TR
- NRHP reference No.: 86002686

Significant dates
- Added to NRHP: September 30, 1986
- Designated PHLF: 2002

The Linden Avenue School (also known as Pittsburgh Linden K-5 School), is a public magnet school in the Point Breeze neighborhood of Pittsburgh, Pennsylvania. It was built in 1903. It was listed on the National Register of Historic Places in 1986.

== See also ==
- Park Place School
