= Renaissance Academy Charter School =

School in Pennsylvania, United States

Coordinates: 40.140614°N 75.521919°W

Location
- 413 Fairview Street; Phoenixville Township, Pennsylvania; USA

Information
- Type: Public charter primary and secondary school
- Established: 1999
- Principal: Michelle Boyd (upper school)
- Faculty: 136
- Grades: K-12
- Enrollment: 1200+ (2024)
- Colors: Black, Burgundy, and Silver
- Mascot: The Knight
- Website: http://www.rak12.org/

Renaissance Academy Charter School, located in Phoenixville, Pennsylvania, United States is a K-12 charter school with over 1200 students and 200 staff. It serves students from multiple school districts in kindergarten through 12th grade.

The average SAT score for the Class of 2013 was 528 in math, 513 in reading, and 489 in writing.
