= Pittsburgh Milliones, University Preparatory School =

University Prep

Location
- 3117 Centre Avenue; Pittsburgh, Pennsylvania 15219; United States
- 40.4498°N 79.9628°W

Information
- School type: Public
- Motto: We Believe, We Achieve, We Succeed
- Established: 2008
- School district: Pittsburgh Public Schools
- Principal: Mr. Eric Graf
- Grades: 6-12
- Enrollment: 286 (2022-2023)
- Colors: Navy blue and vegas gold
- Mascot: Wildcats
- Website: Pittsburgh Milliones, University Preparatory School

University Prep 6-12 is a secondary magnet school in the Sugar Top (Hill District) neighborhood of Pittsburgh, Pennsylvania, United States. University Prep is one of ten high schools in the Pittsburgh Public Schools.

== Feeder District ==
University Prep also specifically serves the City of Pittsburgh neighborhoods of Bedford Dwellings, Bloomfield, Bluff, Central Business District, Central Lawrenceville, Crawford-Roberts, Friendship, Garfield, Lower Lawrenceville, Middle Hill, Morningside, Polish Hill, Stanton Heights, Strip District, Terrace Village, Upper Hill, Upper Lawrenceville and West Overland.

== History ==
University Prep was established in 2008 by a partnership between the University of Pittsburgh and Pittsburgh Public Schools. It opened with 145 ninth grade students for the 2008-09 school year. The school added a tenth grade class and middle school classes for the 2009-10 school year, added eleventh grade class in the 2010-2011 school year, and added twelfth grade classes in successive years. Its first graduating class was in 2012.

== Campus ==
University Prep is housed in the former Margaret Milliones Middle School building. The school was originally known as Herron Hill Junior High School. Herron Hill took its name from the land surrounding the mansion of the Mayor of Pittsburgh from 1849 to 1850, John Herron. The school was designed by architects Avalon and Center, and opened in 1928. The school was closed in 1974, and after extensive remodeling, reopened as the Margaret Milliones Middle School.
