= List of people from Pittsburgh =

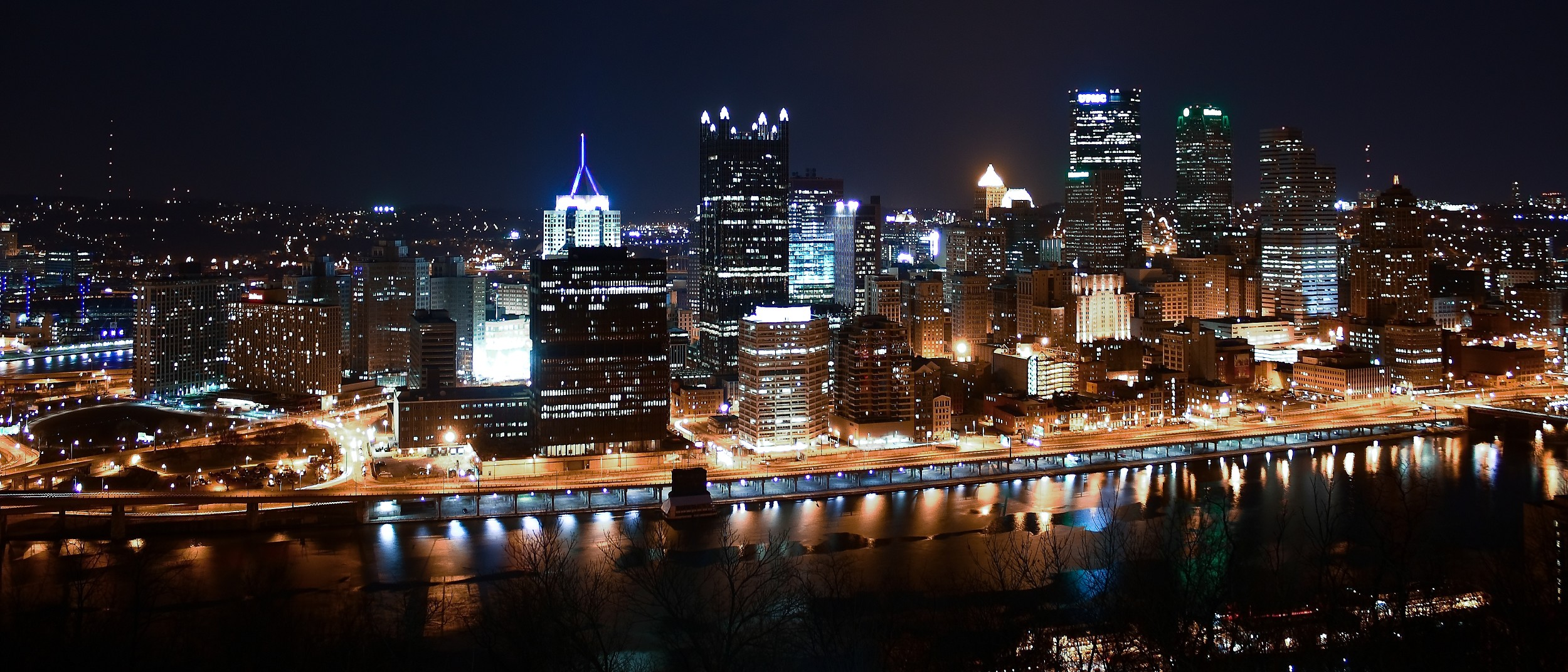
Pittsburgh skyline at twilight

This article contains a list of notable people who were born or lived a significant amount of time in Pittsburgh, Pennsylvania, the second-largest city and second-largest metropolitan area in Pennsylvania after Philadelphia.

== Artists ==
=== Actresses ===
- Tina Benko
- Julie Benz
- Lori Cardille
- Caitlin Clarke
- Dolores Costello
- Marpessa Dawn
- Lisa Emery
- Barbara Feldon
- Rita Gam
- Elizabeth Hartman
- Gillian Jacobs
- Cherie Johnson
- Kimmarie Johnson
- Shirley Jones
- Lorelei King
- Christine Laitta
- Chloe Lukasiak
- Heather Mazur
- Mitzi McCall
- Judith McConnell
- Lia McHugh
- Anisha Nagarajan
- Evelyn Nesbit
- Sandra Dee Robinson
- Margot Rose
- Zelda Rubinstein
- Lillian Russell
- Rena Sofer
- Nia Sioux
- Sam Sorbo
- Mackenzie Ziegler
- Maddie Ziegler

=== Actors ===
- F. Murray Abraham
- Tom Atkins
- Carl Betz
- Christian Borle
- Don Brockett
- Steve Byrne
- Ted Cassidy
- David Conrad
- Maurice Costello
- Rusty Cundieff
- John Davidson
- Jack Dodson
- Charles Esten
- Patrick Fabian
- Joe Flaherty
- Scott Glenn
- Jeff Goldblum
- Frank Gorshin
- Charles Grodin
- Kevin Peter Hall
- John Hodiak
- Michael Keaton
- Gene Kelly
- John Leslie
- Tom Major-Ball
- Joe Manganiello
- Jim Martin
- Kiel Martin
- Adolphe Menjou
- Kermit Murdock
- Burt Mustin
- Manu Narayan
- Bill Nunn
- Michael Park
- Billy Porter
- William Powell
- Zachary Quinto
- Fred Rogers
- Johnny Sins
- Jamie Smith – actor, The Faithful City, Killer's Kiss
- Jimmy Stewart
- Regis Toomey
- Fritz Weaver

=== Comedians ===
- Marty Allen
- Steve Byrne
- Patti Deutsch
- Billy Gardell
- Eddie Ifft
- Anthony Jeselnik
- Jesse Joyce
- Mario Joyner
- Maxine Lapiduss
- Dennis Miller
- Frank Nicotero

=== Reporters and anchors ===
- Jodi Applegate – NBC's Later Today
- John Buccigross – host, SportsCenter on ESPN
- Bill Burns – KDKA anchor (1953–1989)
- Patti Burns – KDKA anchor with her father Bill
- Bill Cardille – broadcaster known as Chilly Billy, host of Chiller Theatre and Studio Wrestling
- Murray Chass – sportswriter
- Beano Cook – ESPN college football analyst
- Myron Cope – sports journalist, radio personality, and sportscaster
- Scott Ferrall – sports talk radio host
- Howard Fineman – Newsweek journalist
- Fred Honsberger – broadcaster
- Sue Kerr – LGBTQ writer
- Jay Mariotti – sportswriter
- Jeanne Moos – CNN reporter
- Art Pallan – broadcaster
- Jim Quinn – radio talk show host
- Martha Rial – 1998 Pulitzer Prize for Spot News Photography
- Rick Sebak – WQED documentarian
- Paul Shannon – host of WTAE-TV children's show Adventure Time
- John Stehr – anchorman at WTHR in Indianapolis, Indiana
- Bari Weiss – opinion writer and editor

=== Media personalities ===
- Porky Chedwick – announcer
- Foo Conner – journalist
- Rege Cordic – actor and broadcaster
- Bill Cullen – TV game show host
- John Dennis – radio host
- Frank DiLeo – Michael Jackson's manager, Goodfellas cast member
- Phil Frank – cartoonist
- Chris Garver – tattoo artist, Miami Ink
- iJustine (Justine Ezarik) – YouTube personality
- Rafe Judkins – Survivor: Guatemala
- Lydia B Kollins – drag queen, RuPaul's Drag Race Season 17, All Stars Season 10
- Sarah Kozer – Joe Millionaire
- Billy Mays – television direct-response advertisement salesperson
- Sheena Monnin – Miss Pennsylvania
- Jenna Morasca – reality show contestant, winner of Survivor: The Amazon
- Sharon Needles – drag queen, winner of season four of RuPaul's Drag Race
- David Newell – TV actor, "Mr. McFeely" on Mister Rogers' Neighborhood
- Beth Ostrosky – model, TV personality, wife of Howard Stern
- Bob Trow – TV actor, "Bob Dog" and "Robert Troll" on Mister Rogers' Neighborhood
- Ricki Wertz – WTAE-TV
- Lucian Wintrich – artist, writer, photographer, former White House correspondent for The Gateway Pundit

=== Producers, directors, and effects ===
- Antoine Fuqua – director
- John P. Harris – invented the first movie theater
- David Hollander – TV and movie producer, director
- Carl Kurlander – film producer, writer
- Sally Lapiduss – producer
- Rob Marshall – director, Chicago
- Greg Nicotero – actor, director, producer, special effects and makeup artist The Walking Dead
- Eric Red – screenwriter and director
- Ford Riley – producer, screenwriter and lyricist; created The Lion Guard
- George A. Romero – director, best known for Night of the Living Dead
- Richard Rossi – director, screenwriter, actor, musician, known for Baseball's Last Hero: 21 Clemente Stories
- Tom Savini – actor, stunt man, director, special effects and makeup artist
- Lou Scheimer – animator, voice actor, co-founder of animation studio Filmation
- David O. Selznick – film producer, Gone with the Wind
- Lewis J. Selznick – film producer
- Myron Selznick – producer, talent agency head

=== Music ===
==== Jazz, soul, R&B, and gospel ====
- Ron Affif – jazz guitarist
- Ray Anthony – bandleader
- Ron Anthony – jazz guitarist, teacher; Sinatra's guitarist for 10 years
- Bob Babbitt – bass player for Motown house band the Funk Brothers
- Sheryl Bailey – jazz guitarist
- George Benson – jazz guitarist, singer
- Harold Betters – jazz trombonist
- Art Blakey – jazz drummer, bandleader
- Ray Brown – jazz double bassist
- Paul Chambers – bass player
- Sonny Clark – jazz pianist
- Kenny Clarke – jazz drummer
- Johnny Costa – jazz pianist
- Frank Cunimondo – jazz pianist
- Johnny Daye – soul singer
- Billy Eckstine – singer
- Roy Eldridge – trumpeter
- Joel Forrester – pianist
- Barry Galbraith – jazz guitarist
- Erroll Garner – jazz pianist
- Walt Harper – jazz pianist
- Earl Hines – jazz pianist
- Roger Humphries – drummer
- Phyllis Hyman – singer
- Ahmad Jamal – jazz pianist
- Eddie Jefferson – singer, composer; wrote the lyrics to "Moody's Mood for Love"
- Dodo Marmarosa – bebop pianist
- Billy May – bandleader, arranger for Frank Sinatra
- Sammy Nestico – arranger for Count Basie Orchestra
- Horace Parlan – pianist
- Leo Pellegrino – baritone saxophonist
- Jimmy Ponder – guitarist
- Billy Price – singer
- Eddie Safranski – bassist
- Shanice
- Dakota Staton – vocalist
- Billy Strayhorn – composer, pianist
- Maxine Sullivan – jazz vocalist
- Stanley Turrentine – tenor saxophone player
- Tommy Turrentine – trumpeter
- Mary Lou Williams – jazz pianist
- Spanky Wilson – jazz vocalist

==== Classics and standards ====
- Loren Allred – singer
- Lory Bianco – singer
- Jackie Evancho – singer
- Colyn Fischer – fiddler
- Stephen Foster – 19th-century songwriter
- Philip Glass – composer
- Byron Janis – pianist
- Oscar Levant – pianist
- Lorenzo Malfatti – Italian opera coach
- Mildred Miller – opera singer
- Joe Negri – musician, professor, best known as "Handyman Negri" on Mister Rogers' Neighborhood
- Leo Robin – lyricist

==== Rock and alternative ====
- Tunde Adebimpe – musician and actor, lead singer of TV on the Radio
- Reb Beach – guitarist in the rock bands Winger and Whitesnake
- Black Moth Super Rainbow – psychedelic electronic band
- Bobby Blotzer – drummer for Ratt
- Ceann – Irish drinking music rock band
- William Fitzsimmons – musician
- feeble little horse - indie rock band
- Girl Talk – musician, real name Gregg Gillis
- Gramsci Melodic – alternative rock band
- Joe Grushecky – Iron City Houserockers, solo artist; worked with Bruce Springsteen
- Donnie Iris – musician
- Ray Luzier – Korn member
- Jerry Mason – singer
- Bret Michaels- singer for Poison and star of Rock of Love
- Weird Paul Petroskey – lo-fi musician
- Justin Sane – lead guitarist and co-singer/songwriter of the political punk rock band Anti-Flag
- The Seven Fields of Aphelion – ambient electronic musician and member of BMSR
- Spike Slawson – singer for Me First and the Gimme Gimmes
- Tobacco – electronic musician and founder of BMSR

==== Classical ====
- Victor Herbert

==== Country and folk ====
- Eric Andersen
- Gabby Barrett
- Bill Deasy
- Guaranteed Irish
- Dan Levenson

==== Pop ====
- Tunde Adebimpe – singer, TV on the Radio
- Christina Aguilera – pop singer / actress / TV judge
- Michele Brourman – composer
- Lou Christie – pop singer, "Lightning Strikes"
- Perry Como – crooner
- Daya – pop singer/songwriter
- The Del-Vikings – vocal group, Come Go With Me
- Jerry Fielding – Oscar-nominated composer
- Chris Jamison – singer-songwriter, musician, and contestant from NBC's The Voice season 7
- The Marcels – vocal group, "Blue Moon"
- The Skyliners – vocal group, Since I Don't Have You
- Jack Stauber – synth-pop singer-songwriter/instrumentalist
- B. E. Taylor – musician
- Bobby Vinton – pop singer, "Blue Velvet"
- Brian Young – drummer and percussionist, Fountains of Wayne

==== Rap and hip-hop ====
- Beedie
- Grand Buffet – rap duo
- Jasiri X – artist, activist, rapper, entrepreneur
- Jero
- Wiz Khalifa
- Lady Miss Kier – Deee-Lite
- Mel-Man – hip hop producer and rapper
- Mac Miller
- Pittsburgh Slim
- Chevy Woods
- Jimmy Wopo

==== Dancers and choreographers ====
- Kyle Abraham – choreographer
- Martha Graham – dancer and choreographer; awarded Presidential Medal of Freedom
- Billy Hartung – Broadway actor, dancer and singer
- Gene Kelly – iconic Hollywood dancer, actor, singer, director, and choreographer
- Chloe Lukasiak – actress and former featured dancer on TV show Dance Moms
- Abby Lee Miller – former dance studio owner, choreographer and team coach for Abby Lee Dance Company; featured on TV show Dance Moms
- Nia Sioux-featured dancer on TV show “Dance Moms”
- Paul Taylor – choreographer
- Jonathan Wolken (1949–2010) – founder of the Pilobolus dance company
- Maddie Ziegler – actress and former featured dancer on TV show Dance Moms
- Mackenzie Ziegler – singer

=== Visual arts ===
- Matt Baker – comic book artist
- Romare Bearden
- Martin Beck – painter
- Seddon Bennington
- Sharif Bey – sculptor, ceramist, educator
- Ailsa Mellon Bruce – Mellon heir and art patron
- Norman Daly – visual artist
- Vanessa German – sculptor, poet
- David Hanna – artist
- Charles "Teenie" Harris – photographer
- Jerry Harris – sculptor
- Yvonne Jacquette – painter and printmaker
- Henry Koerner – painter
- Michael Lotenero – painter and sculptor
- Scott McDaniel – comic book artist
- James Michalopoulos – painter and sculptor
- Burton Morris – artist
- Thaddeus Mosley – sculptor
- Sharon Needles – drag queen, winner of RuPaul's Drag Race season 4
- Jackie Ormes
- Philip Pearlstein – painter
- Sara Penn – designer and curator
- Ed Piskor – comic book artist
- Robert Qualters – painter
- Sue Reno – fiber artist
- Lawrence Saint – stained glass artist
- Naomi Sims – model
- Quest Skinner – mixed media artist
- George Sotter – painter
- Jack Stauber – animator
- Renee Stout – multi-media artist
- Andy Warhol – painter
- Julia Warhola

=== Authors ===
- Joseph Bathanti – poet, writer, professor; NC Poet Laureate, 2012–2014
- Nellie Bly – Pulitzer Prize-winning investigative journalist and writer
- Kenneth Burke – literary theorist
- Rachel Carson – marine biologist, writer, and conservationist
- Willa Cather – author, Pulitzer Prize winner
- Michael Chabon – Pulitzer Prize-winning author
- Murray Chass – New York Times baseball writer, author
- Stephen Chbosky – author
- Malcolm Cowley – poet, critic
- Melanie Craft – novelist; wife of Larry Ellison of Oracle
- Stephen Dau – writer
- Annie Dillard – author and Pulitzer Prize winner
- Harry Dolan – writer
- Zak Ebrahim – author, peace activist, public speaker
- Ed Folsom – professor and editor
- Jack Gilbert – poet
- Lester Goran – writer and professor
- Beth Gylys – poet and professor
- George Heard Hamilton – art historian
- Kerry Hannon – author
- Agatha Tiegel Hanson – writer, poet, and editor
- Samuel Hazo – poet and professor
- Lori Jakiela – author
- George S. Kaufman – humorist, playwright
- Joseph Koerner – art historian
- David Leavitt – novelist
- Stephen Manes – magazine writer, author
- David McCullough – historian and author and two-time Pulitzer Prize winner
- Elizabeth Moorhead – novelist
- Burton Morris – painter
- Stewart O'Nan – author
- Peter Oresick – poet
- a. k. payne - playwright
- Mary Roberts Rinehart – mystery writer
- William Roos – playwright, mystery novelist, and screenwriter
- Gladys Schmitt – writer
- Jim Shooter – comic book writer, editor and publisher
- Michael Simms – poet in Pittsburgh since 1987
- George Smith – gambler, handicapper
- Gertrude Stein – writer, poet, playwright, and feminist
- Gerald Stern – poet
- Kathleen Tessaro – novelist
- John Edgar Wideman – author and professor
- August Wilson – Pulitzer Prize-winning playwright
- Cecilia Woloch – poet and writer
- Damon Young – author and columnist

== Athletes ==
=== Baseball ===
- Glenn Beckert – second baseman
- Buddy Bell – third baseman (1972–1989)
- Bill Blair
- Dave Bush
- Ollie Carnegie – 1931–1945
- Betty Jane Cornett (1932–2006) – third base (1950–1952) All-American Girls Professional Baseball League
- Bill Doak – Cardinals and Dodgers, inventor of the modern baseball glove
- Ryan Garko – first baseman, Giants
- Josh Gibson – Negro league player, Pittsburgh Crawfords and Homestead Grays
- Gary Green
- Howdy Groskloss – shortstop 1930–32
- Ian Happ – Chicago Cubs
- Art Howe – managed Astros and A's
- Derek Law – pitcher
- Bobby Lowe – first MLB player with 4 home runs in a game
- Sam McDowell
- Marguerite Pearson – utility player 1948–1954, All-American Girls Professional Baseball League
- Heinie Smith
- Trent Thornton – pitcher for the Toronto Blue Jays
- Harold Joseph "Pie" Traynor – Pirates Hall of Fame member
- Honus Wagner – shortstop, Hall of Fame member
- Neil Walker – former MLB second baseman
- Bobby Wallace – Hall of Fame inductee
- John Wehner – Pirates infielder, broadcaster
- Josh Wilson – 2005–present

==== Baseball contributors ====
- Bill Benswanger – Pirates owner, vocal advocate for integration
- Chuck Greenberg – Rangers former owner
- Gus Greenlee – Crawfords founder
- John P. Harris – Boston Braves owner
- Ray Kennedy – scout and GM
- Tony LaCava – longtime scout and assistant general manager

=== Basketball ===
==== Coaches ====
- Dick Bennett – Wisconsin, Washington State 1976–2006
- Paul Birch
- Eddie Cameron – Duke 1929–1949 until 1972, Cameron Indoor Stadium, founding member of the ACC, football coach and Olympic selector
- Suzie McConnell-Serio – WNBA player 1998–2000, head coach 2004–2006, Duquesne 2007–2013
- Dudey Moore
- Skip Prosser – Loyola (MD), Xavier, and Wake Forest 1993–2007
- Herb Sendek – NC State and Arizona State 1994–2015

==== Forwards and centers ====
- John Abramovic – 1946–1948
- DeJuan Blair – Pitt All-American, Spurs 2009–2013, Mavericks 2013–2014
- Chuck Cooper – 1950–1956; first drafted African-American
- Jakim Donaldson (born 1983) – player in the Israeli Basketball Premier League
- Ken Durrett – 1971–1975 NBA
- Paul Grant – 1997–2004
- Maurice Lucas – 1975–1988
- Walt Miller – 1946–47
- Maurice Stokes – Rochester/Cincinnati Royals 1955–1958; Hall of Famer
- Walt Szczerbiak – 1971–72 NBA
- Michael Young (born 1994) – Ironi Nahariya of the Israeli Basketball Premier League

==== Guards ====
- Moe Barr – 1970–71 NBA
- Paul Birch
- Ron Carter – 1978–1980 NBA
- Calvin Fowler – 1969–70
- DeAndre Kane
- T. J. McConnell – Arizona Wildcats and Philadelphia 76er and Indiana Pacers
- Jack Twyman – 1955–1966, Hall of Famer

==== Basketball contributors ====
- Mark Cuban – Mavericks owner
- Tim Grgurich – Pitt coach
- Ted Stepien – Cavs former owner

=== Boxing ===
- Bob Baker – heavyweight contender
- Eddie Chambers – Heavyweight and Cruiserweight Contender, 2008–2016
- Billy Conn – light-heavyweight champ 1939–1941
- Andy DePaul – middleweight contender, referee
- Harry Greb – middleweight champ 1923
- Frank Klaus – middleweight champ 1904
- Paul Spadafora – lightweight champ, 1999
- Jackie Wilson – featherweight champ, early 1900s (decade)
- Teddy Yarosz – middleweight champ, 1934
- Fritzie Zivic – welterweight champ, 1940

=== Figure skating ===
- Michael Seibert – five-time gold medalist at U.S. Figure Skating Championships; three bronze medals at World Championships
- Jamie Silverstein – ice dancing
- Taylor Toth – pairs skating

=== Football ===
==== Coaches: primarily NFL ====
- Joe Bugel – assistant and head coach 1975–present; founder of the "Hogs" of the 1980s
- Jim Haslett – head coach Saints (2000–2005), Rams D.C. (2006–08)
- Mike McCarthy – head coach Packers 2005–2018, Cowboys 2020-2024, Steelers 2026-present
- Herb McCracken – college 1920s and 1930s
- Mike Miller – assistant 1999–present
- Dick Nolan – head coach, San Francisco 49ers and New Orleans Saints

==== Coaches: other football ====
- Frank Cignetti Jr. – University of Pittsburgh
- Tom Davies – 1922–1947
- Rich Lackner – Carnegie Mellon 1986–2021
- Joseph H. Thompson – University of Pittsburgh – 1909–1912

==== Quarterbacks ====
- Marc Bulger – 2000–2011, Super Bowl
- Chuck Fusina – NFL 1979–1986
- Bruce Gradkowski – Steelers, Bucs, Raiders 2006–2016
- Major Harris – record-setter in college and CFL
- Leon Hart – Heisman Trophy, College Hall of Fame
- Al Jacks – quarterback, Penn State and college head coach
- Jim Kelly – 1986–1996, Hall of Fame, 4 Super Bowl appearances
- Dan Marino – 1983–1999, Hall of Fame 1 Super Bowl appearance
- Mike McMahon – NFL, CFL, UFL quarterback 2001–2012
- Joe Namath – New York Jets, Alabama Crimson Tide National Champion
- Rod Rutherford – NFL quarterback 2004–2006 and college coach
- Matt Schaub – NFL quarterback 2004–2020
- Willie Thrower – first black quarterback in the NFL
- Johnny Unitas – 1956–1973, Hall of Famer, two Super Bowls
- Alex Van Pelt – 1995–2003
- Scott Zolak – 1991–1999, 1 Super Bowl appearance

==== Running backs ====
- Kevan Barlow – NFL running back 2001–2007
- Larry Brown – running back, Washington Redskins 1969–1976
- Tony Dorsett – NFL, HOF, Dallas Cowboys, University of Pittsburgh
- Cookie Gilchrist – AFL and CFL
- Warren Heller – NFL halfback 1930s
- William F. Knox – Yale and Carnegie Tech halfback
- Roger Kochman – 1963
- Curtis Martin – 1995–2006, HOF, Super Bowl
- Harry McChesney – 1900s, NFL
- Eugene "Mercury" Morris – 70s Dolphins; two Super Bowls
- Vinnie Sunseri – NFL player and coach
- Ray Zellars – Saints

==== Receivers and tight ends ====
- Brian Baschnagel – originally a running back, Ohio State, Bears 1976–1984
- Darnell Dinkins – NFL tight end in the 1990s and 2000s (decade)
- John Frank – NFL tight end in the 1980s
- Gregg Garrity – Penn State, NFL 1983–1989
- Ken Herock – NFL tight end 1963–1969, Super Bowl
- Brandon Marshall – NFL wide receiver 2006–2018
- Rasheed Marshall – NFL wide receiver 2005–2007
- Joel Williams – NFL tight end, 1987

==== Offensive linemen ====
- Adam Bisnowaty – NFL offensive linesman for the New York Giants
- Dean Caliguire – NFL lineman in 1991
- Bill Fralic – offensive lineman for Atlanta Falcons, '80s All-Decade Team
- Gary Greaves – tackle 1960
- Leander Jordan – offensive lineman, Carolina Panthers, San Diego Chargers, Atlanta Falcons, Jacksonville Jaguars
- Mose Lantz – NFL center 1933
- William R. Moore – NFL guard in the 1940s
- Bull Polisky – NFL guard 1929
- Tom Ricketts – NFL tackle 1980s and 1990s
- Mike Rosenthal – NFL tackle 1999–2007
- Jack Sack – NFL guard in the 1920s

==== Defensive linemen ====
- Mike Barnes – pro bowler 1973–1981
- Bob Buczkowski – NFL defensive end in the 1980s
- Sam Clancy – NFL defensive end in the 1980s and 1990s
- Ave Daniell – NFL tackle in the 1930s
- Aaron Donald – NFL defensive tackle
- Jack Dugger – NFL lineman 1946–49
- Art Gob – NFL defensive end, 1950s and 1960s
- Cameron Heyward – NFL 2011–present
- Tyrique Jarrett – NFL defensive tackle
- David Logan – defensive tackle 1970s and 1980s
- Leo Skladany – NFL defensive end 1940s and 1950s
- Jason Taylor – defensive end; five-time Pro Bowler for Miami Dolphins
- Randy White – defensive lineman 1975–1988; three Super Bowls, Hall of Fame

==== Defensive backs and linebackers ====
- LaVar Arrington – NFL linebacker 2000–2006
- Jack Butler – cornerback 1951–1959, Pro Football Hall of Fame
- Jim Flanigan Sr. – NFL linebacker 1960s and 1970s
- Don Graham – Penn State, NFL 1987–1989
- Bobby Grier – Pitt Panthers 1952–1956, Hall of Famer, civil rights icon
- Justin King – NFL 2008–2012
- Nick Kwiatkoski – linebacker for the Atlanta Falcons
- Sean Lee – former linebacker for Dallas Cowboys
- Mike Logan – NFL safety 1996–2006, Super Bowl
- Paul Martha – NFL safety in the 1960s
- Dick McCabe – NFL safety in the 1950s and 1960s
- Ryan Mundy – NFL safety
- Paul Posluszny – Dick Butkus Award winner from Penn State, linebacker for Buffalo Bills
- Scott Radecic – Penn State and NFL linebacker 1984–1995
- Bryant Salter – NFL safety in the 1970s
- Joe Schmidt – linebacker 1953–1965, Hall of Fame
- Raymond Ventrone – safety, Cleveland Browns
- Eric Wicks – safety, finalist for Bronko Nagurski Award in 2007

==== Football specialists ====
- Pat McAfee – All Pro NFL punter, 2010's all decade team
- Don Silvestri – kicker in the 1990s

==== Football contributors ====
- Dave Berry – pro football pioneer
- Kevin Colbert – director of football operations (2 Super Bowls)
- Dale Hamer – NFL referee 1978–2001, 3 Super Bowls
- Shaun Herock – NFL executive
- Bill Nunn – Steelers scout since 1967
- Art Rooney – owner and founder of Pittsburgh Steelers Duquesne University
- Dan Rooney – second chairman of the Pittsburgh Steelers, member of the Pro Football Hall of Fame
- David Tepper – owner of the Carolina Panthers

=== Golf ===
- Scott Dunlap – PGA and Champions Tour
- Bob Friend – PGA and Nationwide Tour
- Jim Simons – as an amateur nearly won 1971 U.S. Open; first tournament winner using a metal driver
- Brendon Todd – PGA Tour

=== Hockey ===
==== Forwards ====
- Gerry O'Flaherty – Leafs, Canucks, Flames 1971–1979
- William Thomas – Coyotes, Penguins, Panthers, 2005–2012
- John Zeiler - Kings 2006-2011
- George Parros - Kings, Avalanche, Ducks, Panthers, Canadiens 2006-14
- Henrik Samuelsson – Coyotes winger 2014–2015
- R. J. Umberger – Flyers, Jackets center 2005–2016
- Ryan Malone – Penguins, Lightning, Rangers 2003–2015; 2017
- Riley Barber – Capitals, Canadiens, Red Wings 2017–2022
- Brandon Saad – Blackhawks, Blue Jackets, Avalanche, Blues, Golden Knights, 2011–present
- Vincent Trocheck – Panthers, Hurricanes, Rangers, Mammoth 2014-present
- Sam Lafferty - Penguins Blackhawks, Maple Leafs, Canucks, Sabres, Panthers 2019-present
- Logan Cooley - Coyotes, Mammoth 2023-present

==== Defense ====
- Bob Beers - Bruins, Lightning, Oilers, Islanders 1989-1997
- Dylan Reese – Islanders, Rangers, Penguins, Coyotes 2009–2015
- Nate Guenin - Flyers, Penguins, Blue Jackets, Ducks, Avalanche 2006-2016
- Mike Weber – Sabres, Capitals 2007-16
- Stephen Johns - Stars 2015-2020
- Matt Bartkowski - Bruins, Canucks, Flames, Wild, 2010-2021

==== Goalies ====
- John Gibson – Ducks, Red Wings 2013-present

==== Hockey contributors ====
- James Wallace Conant – managed Duquesne Gardens

=== Motorsports ===
- Chip Ganassi – former driver, now team owner in IndyCar and NASCAR
- Dick Linder – 1950s NASCAR driver

=== Olympic sports ===
- Kurt Angle – 1996 gold medalist in freestyle wrestling, later became a professional wrestler
- Robert "Bob" Blum (born 1928) – Olympic fencer
- Herb Douglas – long jump bronze medalist at 1948 Summer Olympics; inducted into Pennsylvania Sports Hall of Fame 1992
- Michael Grady – rower and gold medalist
- Jake Herbert – folkstyle and freestyle wrestler, 2009 world silver medalist, represented USA at 2012 Summer Olympics
- Suzie McConnell-Serio – basketball 1988 and 1992
- Amanda Polk – rowing, gold medalist W8+ in 2016 Olympics
- Allison Schmitt – competitive swimmer, four time Olympian
- Leah Smith – swimming, gold and bronze medalist in 2016 Olympics

=== Soccer ===
- Mike Bookie – midfielder and National Soccer Hall of Fame inductee
- Frank Bucci – goalkeeper
- Meghan Klingenberg – defender
- Tanner Rosborough – forward
- Sarah Schupansky – midfielder and forward
- A. J. Wood – forward
- Marvell Wynne – defender

=== Tennis ===
- Bjorn Fratangelo – French Open boys' champion
- Bonnie Gadusek – pro tennis player, reached U.S. Open quarterfinals
- Gretchen Magers – reached Wimbledon and French Open quarterfinals
- Alison Riske – WTA player, reached 4th round of U.S. Open

=== Professional wrestling ===
- Kurt Angle – WWE/TNA wrestler and Olympic gold medalist
- Britt Baker – AEW wrestler
- Rob Conway – WWE wrestler on RAW brand
- Johnny De Fazio – known as "Jumping" Johnny De Fazio
- Dominic DeNucci – WWWF wrestler and trainer
- Shane Douglas – ECW, WCW, and WWF wrestler
- Corey Graves – wrestler, WWE commentator
- Thea Hail – wrestler
- Mike Jones – known as Virgil in WWE; worked as Vincent, Shane and Curly Bill in WCW
- Cody Michaels – former USWA tag team champion, ECW, WSX producer
- John Minton – WWF aka Big John Studd
- Bruno Sammartino – two-time World Wide Wrestling Federation champion
- Mike Scicluna – known as Baron Mikel Scicluna
- Jeffrey Sciullo – WWE wrestler known as Ezekiel (formerly Elias (Samson))
- John Sullivan – known as Johnny Valiant
- Newton Tattrie – known as Geeto Mongol
- Larry Zbyszko (real name Larry Whistler) – director of authority on Total Nonstop Action Wrestling

=== Other sports ===
- Frank S. Bissell - amateur wrestler, head coach
- Danny Chew – cyclist, winner of Race Across America (1996, 1999)
- Joseph Kearney – athletic administrator
- George Smith – horse racing
- Tom Wallisch – professional skier

== Industry ==
=== Aviation ===
- Paige Kassalen – electrical engineer on Solar Impulse
- Willard Rockwell – formed Rockwell Intl.
- Calbraith Perry Rodgers – made the first transcontinental flight

=== Steel and metals ===
- James W. Brown – Crucible Steel
- Andrew Carnegie – steel tycoon and philanthropist, founded what became U.S. Steel
- William Donner – steel tycoon, founded Monessen and Donora, daughter married FDR's son in 1932
- George Washington Gale Ferris Jr. – steel engineer, businessman and inventor of the Ferris wheel
- Henry Clay Frick – steel tycoon, chief operation officer of what became U.S. Steel
- Charles Martin Hall – aluminum producer and founder of Alcoa
- Julian Kennedy – mechanical engineer in steel
- George Lauder – Scottish-American billionaire industrialist; partner in the Carnegie Steel Company; board member of U.S. Steel; cousin-brother of Andrew Carnegie
- James H. Laughlin – Jones & Laughlin Steel
- John Leishman – executive at Carnegie Steel
- William Metcalf – Fort Pitt foundry
- Charles M. Schwab – founder of Bethlehem Steel
- John P. Surma – U.S. Steel
- Thomas Usher – CEO of U.S. Steel and chairman of the board of Marathon Oil
- John Walker – iron and steel industrialist

=== Energy ===
- Walter Arnheim – Mobil executive and corporate and non-profit advisor
- Frederick Bausman
- E. W. Marland – oilman, founded what would become Conoco, also became the governor of Oklahoma
- William Mellon – co-founded Gulf Oil

=== Transport ===
- Erik Buell – Buell Motorcycle Company
- Alexander Cassatt – Pennsylvania Railroad
- Louis Semple Clarke – steamboats
- John E. Connelly – Gateway Clipper Fleet
- Mike Fink – river boatman
- Robert Pitcairn – Pennsylvania Railroad
- Samuel Rea – Pennsylvania Railroad

=== Finance ===
- John F. Donahue – chairman, Federated Investors
- Stanley Druckenmiller – hedge fund manager
- Thomas Marshall Howe – 19th-century politician
- Richard B. Mellon – banker, philanthropist
- Thomas Mellon – founded Mellon Financial
- David Tepper – businessman, hedge fund manager, philanthropist, and owner of the Carolina Panthers
- William Thaw – 19th-century banker

=== Technology and communications ===
- Luis von Ahn – CAPTCHA inventor, Duolingo founder
- William Bullock – printing press innovator
- Charlie Cheever – co-founder of Quora
- Brendan Eich – Mozilla, creator of JavaScript
- Caterina Fake – co-founder of Flickr and Hunch
- John P. Harris – theater owner
- James Lindenberg – founder of ABS-CBN Corporation and Radio Philippines Network
- Regis McKenna – high technology marketing guru
- Willard Rockwell – pioneer of Rockwell Intl.
- Richard Mellon Scaife – Tribune-Review
- Rich Skrenta – computer programmer
- George Westinghouse – electrical industry pioneer
- Jeff Wilke – Amazon executive and businessman
- Mark Whitaker – CNN Worldwide chief
- Jamie Zawinski – hacker

=== Consumer goods ===
- Peter Chartier (Chartiers Town and Tarentum) – fur trader 1734–1743
- David L. Clark
- H. J. Heinz II – CEO of H.J. Heinz Co.
- Henry J. Heinz – founder of H. J. Heinz Company
- Edgar J. Kaufmann – Kaufmann's
- Billy Mays – TV pitchman
- James Sinegal – Costco
- Patricia A. Woertz – ADM

=== Other industries ===
- William D. Boyce – founder of Boy Scouts of America
- Dr. Herbert Boyer – co-founder of Genentech
- John Baptiste Ford – PPG Industries
- Ed Grier – Disneyland
- Joseph A. Hardy III – 84 Lumber
- Bob Stupak – Vegas Stratosphere

=== Labor ===
- David J. McDonald – president of steelworkers union
- Theodore Schaffer – president of the Amalgamated Association of Iron, Steel, and Tin Workers
- Fannie Sellins – union organizer
- John Sheridan Weller – attorney and politician
- Joseph Yablonski – UMW

== Religion ==
- Catherine Anne Cesnik (1942–1969) – Catholic nun who was murdered
- Cardinal Daniel DiNardo – archbishop of Galveston-Houston
- Thomas Dolinay – archbishop
- Joseph R. Lamonde
- Cardinal Adam Maida – emeritus archbishop of Detroit
- Lippman Mayer – rabbi
- Janice McLaughlin – Catholic nun and human rights activist
- Madalyn Murray O'Hair – founder of American Atheists
- William Passavant
- George Rapp – founder of the religious sect Harmonists
- Charles Owen Rice
- Charles Taze Russell – founder of Watch Tower Bible & Tract Society
- R. C. Sproul – theologian
- Thomas J. Tobin – auxiliary bishop of Pittsburgh, bishop of Youngstown, Ohio, and current bishop of Providence, Rhode Island
- Elizabeth Ursic – theologian and scholar
- Cardinal Donald Wuerl – eleventh bishop of the Roman Catholic Diocese of Pittsburgh, current archbishop of Washington
- David Zubik – twelfth and current bishop of the Roman Catholic Diocese of Pittsburgh

== Science and engineering ==
- Ross Allen – herpetologist
- Frederick S. Billig – scramjet pioneer
- Marilyn Bracken – chemist
- Daniel Chamovitz – biologist, author of What a Plant Knows, and president of Ben Gurion University of the Negev
- Yuan Chang – virologist, co-discoverer of causes of several viral cancers, including Kaposi's sarcoma
- Norman Christ – physicist
- Childs Frick
- George Otto Gey – scientist who propagated the HeLa cell line
- William Jacob Holland – entomologist and chancellor of the Western University of Pennsylvania
- Irene Jakab (1919–2011) – native of Hungary, psychiatrist and humanist; member of the faculties of Harvard University, the University of Pittsburgh and the McLean Hospital
- Ayana Jordan – addiction psychiatrist
- Robin Kanarek – physiological psychologist and academic administrator
- Randy Pausch – founder of Alice, and man behind the Last Lecture
- David M. Pozar – electrical engineer and academician
- Jonas Salk – physician, inventor of first polio vaccine
- Alex Shigo – arboriculturist and horticulturist
- Clifford Shull – Nobel Prize winner
- Herbert A. Simon – Carnegie Mellon University professor; winner of Nobel Prize for Economics
- Thomas Starzl – pioneering transplant surgeon in liver and multiorgan transplantation
- Jesse Steinfeld – United States Surgeon General under Nixon
- Otto Stern – German-American physicist and Nobel laureate, known for his studies of molecular beams; Carnegie Institute of Technology professor
- Nicholas E. Wagman
- Sandra Welner (1958–2001) – physician, advocate for disabled women's healthcare
- Jerome Wolken (1917–1999) – biophysicist
- Jamie Zawinski
- Jonathan Zittrain – professor of Internet law and computer science at Harvard
- Vladimir Zworykin – engineer and inventor, developed an early form of television; the IEEE presents a Vladimir Zworykin Award for outstanding contributions to development of television technology

== Military ==
=== 18th-century leaders ===
- Ebenezer Denny – 10th adjutant general of the U.S. Army

=== 19th-century leaders ===
- John M. Corse
- Benjamin Grierson – Civil War and Buffalo Soldier
- Alexander Hays – brigadier general*, repulsed Pickett's Charge at Gettysburg
- Francis J. Herron
- Alexander Murray – admiral
- James Scott Negley – major general Civil War hero of Murfreesboro
- Thomas A. Rowley (1808–1892) – brigadier general; Gettysburg; Civil War
- Jacob B. Sweitzer – general*, Civil War, led major offensives at Gettysburg
- Samuel Baldwin Marks Young

=== 20th-century leaders ===
- Joseph R. Lamonde
- Manus MacCloskey – brigadier general
- Samuel Baldwin Marks Young – first chief of staff of the Army

=== 21st-century leaders ===
- Michael Hayden – USAF ****, director of NSA, CIA
- Harry E. Miller Jr. – major general who commanded the 42nd Infantry Division

=== Medal recipients: Civil War ===
- Charles Higby
- Alexander Kelly
- Alfred L. Pearson – Medal of Honor
- James Schoonmaker

=== Medal recipients: United States occupation of Veracruz ===
- Charles Bishop
- Robert Semple

=== Medal recipients: World War I ===
- Joseph H. Thompson – Medal of Honor

=== Medal recipients: World War II ===
- Arthur V. Ely
- Charles E. Kelly
- Archibald Mathies

=== Medal recipients: Vietnam ===
- William D. Morgan
- William R. Prom

=== Astronauts ===
- Jay Apt – astronaut and professor
- Mike Fincke – colonel, United States Air Force
- Terry Hart – lieutenant colonel, United States Air Force
- James Irwin – Apollo Lunar Module pilot of Apollo 15 and eighth person to walk on the Moon

=== Other military ===
- Thomas Enright – first soldier from Pennsylvania, and possibly first American soldier, killed in World War I
- Adrian Cronauer – airman, radio personality, subject of Good Morning, Vietnam
- Charles Graner – U.S. Army reservist convicted of prisoner abuse in connection with 2003–2004 Abu Ghraib prisoner abuse scandal

== Government ==
=== Governors and mayors ===
- Bob Cranmer – Allegheny County commissioner
- Justin Fairfax – lieutenant governor of Virginia
- Bob Filner – San Diego mayor
- Rich Fitzgerald - Longest-serving Allegheny County Executive
- John F. Forward Sr. – 12th mayor of San Diego
- John F. Forward Jr. – 21st mayor of San Diego
- Barbara Hafer – first female Allegheny County commissioner
- E. W. Marland – governor of Oklahoma
- Elliot S. N. Morgan – Wyoming governor
- Janet Napolitano – Arizona governor
- Tom Ridge – governor 1995–2001; first Secretary of Homeland Security
- John K. Tener – governor, former MLB pitcher
- Dick Thornburgh – governor 1979–1987; U.S. attorney general 1987–1991
- Tom Vilsack – Iowa governor, 1999–2007; agriculture secretary, 2009–2017

=== Congressmen and senators ===
- Henry Marie Brackenridge – congressman 1840–1841
- John Dalzell – congressman 1887–1913; chairman of the Ways and Means committee 1898–1913
- Chris Deluzio – U.S. representative for Pennsylvania
- Harmar Denny – congressman 1825–1837
- Bob Filner – California congressman 1993–2012
- Orrin Hatch – Utah senator, 1977–2019
- John Heinz – congressman 1971–1977, senator 1977–1991
- Thomas Marshall Howe – congressman 1851–1855
- John Kasich – Ohio congressman 1983–2001, governor 2011–2019
- Mike Kelly – U.S. representative for Pennsylvania
- Philander C. Knox – Senator 1901–1904, 1917–1921, United States attorney general 1901–1904, secretary of state 1909–1913
- Conor Lamb - Former United States Representative and Senate Candidate
- Dave McCormick – U.S. senator for Pennsylvania
- Robert McKnight – congressman 1859–1863
- George T. Oliver – senator 1909–1917
- Rand Paul – U.S. senator for Kentucky
- Ron Paul – U.S. representative for Texas
- David A. Reed – senator
- Guy Reschenthaler – U.S. representative for Pennsylvania
- W. C. Rutter – Washington State senator 1891–1895,
- Rick Santorum – congressman 1991–1995, senator 1995–2007
- Claudine Schneider – congresswoman, Rhode Island 1981–1991

=== State secretaries ===
- Jocelyn Benson - Michigan Secretary of State 2019-

=== Jurists ===
- Max Baer – Pennsylvania Supreme Court 2003–
- Derrick Bell – law professor
- Robert Bork – Supreme Court nominee, and acting AG
- George Dallas – Federal Court of Appeals 1892–1909
- Michael Fisher – Federal Court of Appeals 2003–
- Albert Gordon – advocate for gay rights
- Ken Gormley
- Philip Heymann – served in Carter and Clinton administrations
- William G. Hundley – prosecutor and criminal defense attorney
- Linda Kelly – Pennsylvania attorney general
- Rolf Larsen – state supreme court justice
- Donald J. Lee – federal 1989–2000
- Timothy K. Lewis – federal 1991–1992, appeals 1992–1999
- Carol Los Mansmann – federal 1982–1985, appeals 1985–2002
- Wilson McCandless – U.S. judge
- Joan Melvin – Pennsylvania Supreme Court 2009–
- John Lester Miller – 1954–1971
- Michael Angelo Musmanno – PA Supreme Court and Nuremberg tribunal
- John Roll – chief justice of the United States District Court for the District of Arizona
- Arthur Schwab – U.S. judge 2002–present
- George Shiras – U.S. Supreme Court
- Sara Soffel – first woman to serve as a judge in Pennsylvania
- William Alvah Stewart – federal 1951–1953
- Hubert Irving Teitelbaum – 1970–1985
- W. H. Seward Thomson – federal – 1914–1928
- Gerald Tjoflat – appeals 1975–present
- Jay Waldman – federal 1988–2003
- Joseph F. Weis Jr. – federal 1970–1973, appeals 1973–1988
- James Scott Young – federal 1908–1914
- Donald Emil Ziegler – federal 1978–2003

=== CIA and defense administrators ===
- Victoria "Torie" Clarke – Assistant Secretary of Defense for Public Affairs under George W. Bush
- Michael Hayden – CIA director 2006–2009

=== White House cabinet ===
- James J. Davis – Secretary of Labor under presidents Harding, Coolidge, and Hoover
- Walter Forward – United States Secretary of the Treasury under John Tyler, 1841–1843
- Albert Gallatin – Treasury Secretary
- Paul H. O'Neill – 72nd United States Secretary of the Treasury
- Edwin Stanton – Secretary of War under President Lincoln
- Judge William Wilkins – Secretary of War under President Tyler

=== Ambassadors ===
- Homer S. Ferguson – Philippines
- Walter Forward – Denmark
- Mark Gilbert – New Zealand; also Major League Baseball player
- George W. Guthrie – Japan
- William W. Irwin – Denmark
- Andrew Mellon – Great Britain 1932–33
- Alexander Pollock Moore – Spain and Peru
- Dan Rooney – Ireland 2009–2012
- Edith S. Sampson – first African-American in the U.N. (1950–1953) and NATO (1961–62)
- Adolph W. Schmidt – Canada 1969–1974
- Phillips Talbot – Greece

=== State legislators ===
- Paul P. Boswell – physician, member of the Illinois House of Representatives
- David Dank – member of the Oklahoma House of Representatives since 2007
- John R. Jones – member of the Wisconsin State Assembly
- Andrew P. Kealy – member of the Wisconsin State Assembly
- Alexander McDonald Thomson – speaker of the Wisconsin State Assembly

=== Suffragists and other women's rights activists ===
- Euphemia Bakewell
- Lucy Dorsey Iams
- Jennie E. Kennedy
- Lucy Kennedy Miller
- Jennie Bradley Roessing
- Eliza Kennedy Smith
- Anne Steytler

=== Other administrators and advisors ===
- Rachel Foster Avery
- John Brabender
- Murray Chotiner
- Patrick R. Donahoe
- Tony Fratto – deputy press secretary (2006–2009)
- Elsie Hillman – former Republican national committeewoman from Pennsylvania
- John Walker III – director, National Gallery of Art

=== Law enforcement ===
- Vic Cianca – Pittsburgh traffic cop made famous by Johnny Carson, Candid Camera and Flashdance
- Thomas Delahanty – police officer who took a bullet in President Ronald Reagan's 1981 assassination attempt; declared a hero and awarded a medal for bravery

== Other ==
- Richard Baumhammers – spree killer
- Lawrence Bittaker – one of the two "Toolbox Killers"
- Connor Michalek – WWE fan and cancer victim
- Shelly Zegart – quilt collector, historian, and advocate

== See also ==
- List of people from Pennsylvania
