= Kanarek =

Kanarek is a surname. Notable people with the surname include:

- Irving Kanarek (1920–2020), American lawyer
- Marcel Kanarek (born 1993), Polish chess grandmaster
- Robin Bennett Kanarek, American nurse, philanthropist, and author
- Robin Kanarek (born 1946), American physiological psychologist
- Yael Kanarek (born 1967), American artist
