= Malfatti =

Malfatti can refer to any of the following:

== People ==
- Anita Malfatti (1889–1964), Brazilian artist
- Franco Maria Malfatti (1927–1991), Italian politician
- Gian Francesco Malfatti (1731–1807), Italian mathematician
- Johann Baptist Malfatti von Monteregio (1775–1859), Italian-Austrian physician
- Johannes Malfatti (born 1976), German composer, sound designer and multi-instrumentalist
- Lorenzo Malfatti (1923–2007), American operatic tenor
- Marina Malfatti (1940–2016), Italian actress
- Radu Malfatti (born 1943), Austrian trombone player
- Therese Malfatti (1792–27 April 1851), Austrian musician

== Other ==
- Malfatti, a variant of gnocchi

== See also ==
- Malfatti circles, geometric figure
- Malfatti Commission (1970–1972), European Commission
