= Pop and Contemporary Fine Art =

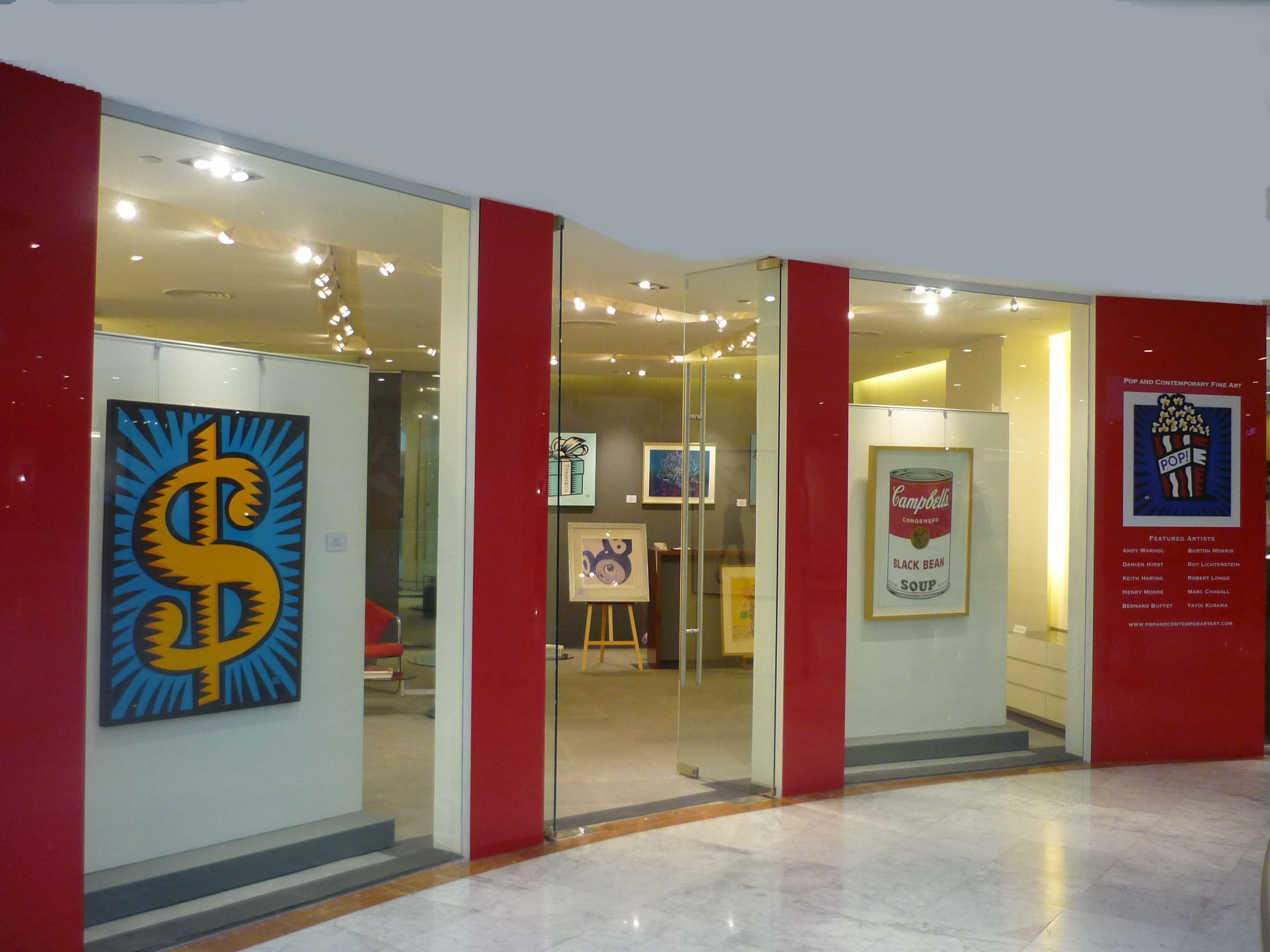
- Pop and Contemporary Fine Art Gallery entrance.

- Location within Singapore
- Established: 2008
- Location: Downtown Core (Orchard MRT station), Singapore
- Coordinates: 1.30725°N 103.82914°E
- Type: Singaporean art, Pop Art, Contemporary art
- Director: Saskia Joosse
- Website: popandcontemporaryart.com

Pop and Contemporary Fine Art is a contemporary art gallery located at Orchard Road, Central Region, Singapore. Residing on the third floor of Palais Renaissance, the gallery specializes in original paintings, limited edition lithographs, screen prints, etchings, and sculptures from the Pop and Contemporary Art genres.

== Philosophy ==
Pop and Contemporary Fine Art's goal is to show contemporary work that would otherwise not be seen in Singapore. "The gallery's guiding principle is to treat people in the same way we would like to be treated. Art is a journey of self-discovery, where you explore your passions and preferences, it is highly personal and intimate and should be in no way a scary journey. "The gallery strives to make art from blue-chip artists more accessible to audiences in Singapore and Southeast Asia region", asserts the gallery's managing director, Saskia Joosse.

== Artists ==
Artists shown at the gallery include:

- Andy Warhol
- Burton Morris
- Keith Haring
- Roy Lichtenstein
- Yayoi Kusama
- Takashi Murakami
- Jim Dine
- Robert Indiana
- Damien Hirst

== Gallery exhibitions ==
The following exhibitions have been held at the gallery:

- 2009: Art Soiree
- 2010: Yayoi Kusama
- 2010: Warhol's 15 Minutes in Singapore
- 2011: Pop! Back into the Future – works by Burton Morris

== External shows ==
The following exhibitions have been held offsite:

- 2010 Burton Morris, W Hotels in Sentosa.
- 2010 Yayoi Kusama, "Land of the Rising Sun", St. Regis Singapore.
- 2010 ARTSingapore Fair in Singapore.
- 2011 Yayoi Kusama, "The Dots Within" at ION Orchard, ION ART Gallery, Singapore.
- 2011 The Affordable Art Fair, Fair in Singapore.

== Publications ==
Pop and Contemporary Fine Art Gallery and its owner, Saskia Joosse have regularly contributed to several publications which include Home and Decor, The Billionaire, Confabulation and The Pocket Arts Guide. In 2011, The Pocket Arts Guide, invited Saskia to be their guest editor for the February edition where she created a special feature on Pop art.
