= Clouded Hills =

Clouded Hills may refer to:

- Clouded Hills, a 1929 historical novel by American writer Elizabeth Moorhead
- The Clouded Hills, a 1980 romance novel by English writer Brenda Jagger
- "Shine forth upon our clouded hills", a reference from the 1804 William Blake poem, "And did those feet in ancient time"

== See also ==
- Clouds Hill, a cottage in the county of Dorset in South West England
- Cloudy Hill, a 440m high hill in Tai Po District of northeastern Hong Kong
