= Walter E. Truemper =

WWII US military officer

Walter Edward Truemper
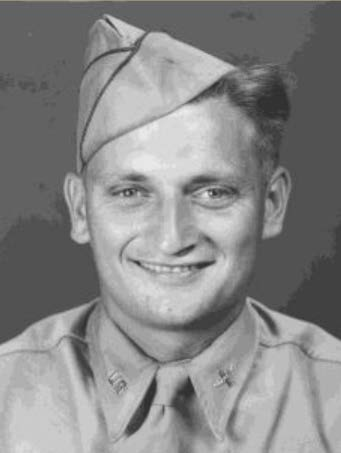
- Born: October 31, 1918; Aurora, Illinois, US
- Died: February 20, 1944 (aged 25); Polebrook, England
- Burial place: Saint Paul's Lutheran Cemetery, Montgomery, Illinois
- Military career
- Allegiance: United States of America
- Branch: United States Army Air Forces
- Service years: 1942–1944
- Rank: Second Lieutenant
- Units: 510th Bombardment Squadron, 351st Bomb Group
- Conflicts: World War II
- Awards: Medal of Honor; Bronze Star; Purple Heart; Air Medal

Walter Edward Truemper (October 31, 1918 – February 20, 1944) was a United States Army Air Forces officer in World War II and a recipient of the U.S. military's highest decoration, the Medal of Honor. He and his crewmate, Staff Sergeant Archibald Mathies, were posthumously awarded the medal for attempting to save the life of their wounded pilot by staying aboard and trying to land their damaged aircraft. Truemper, Mathies, and the pilot were killed when the aircraft crashed following a third unsuccessful landing attempt.

== Biography ==
Born on October 31, 1918, in Aurora, Illinois, Truemper was one of 10 children. He attended business college and worked as an accounting clerk before enlisting in the United States Army from Aurora on June 23, 1942. He served for a few months with the 174th Field Artillery at Camp Bowie, Texas, until he entered flying training. He took pre-flight training at Ellington Field, Texas; flexible gunnery at Harlingen, Texas; and advanced navigation at Hondo, Texas, and was commissioned a second lieutenant, Air Corps on August 26, 1943. He served with the 796th Bomb Squadron at Alexandria, Louisiana, until being sent to the Eighth Air Force as a replacement aircrew member in December 1943. He was assigned to the 510th Bomb Squadron, 351st Bombardment Group, based at RAF Polebrook in England.

On February 20, 1944, Truemper took part in a bombing mission over Leipzig, Germany, as a navigator aboard a B-17G Flying Fortress nicknamed Ten Horsepower (AAF Ser. No. 42-31763, markings TU:A). During the mission, the aircraft was attacked by a squadron of German fighter planes. The attack left the bomber severely damaged, the co-pilot dead, the pilot unconscious, and the radio operator wounded. The remaining crewmen were able to fly the plane back to RAF Polebrook, at which point Truemper and the flight engineer, Sergeant Archibald Mathies, volunteered to stay aboard while the others parachuted to safety. After observing the aircraft, their commanding officer determined that it was too badly damaged for the two inexperienced men to land and ordered them to bail out as well. The pilot was still alive and could not be moved, however, and Truemper and Mathies refused to leave him behind. They made two unsuccessful landing attempts before crashing on their third try, killing all three airmen. For this action, both Truemper and Mathies was awarded the Medal of Honor four months later, on June 22, 1944.

Truemper, aged 25 at his death, was buried at Saint Paul's Lutheran Cemetery in Montgomery, Illinois.

== Awards and decorations ==
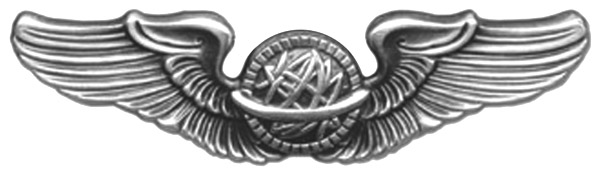

USAAF Navigator badge
Medal of Honor
Bronze Star	Purple Heart	Air Medal
American Campaign Medal	European–African–Middle Eastern Campaign Medal with bronze campaign star	World War II Victory Medal

=== Medal of Honor citation ===
Truemper's official Medal of Honor citation reads:

For conspicuous gallantry and intrepidity at risk of life above and beyond the call of duty in action against the enemy in connection with a bombing mission over enemy-occupied Europe on 20 February 1944. The aircraft on which 2d Lt. Truemper was serving as navigator was attacked by a squadron of enemy fighters with the result that the co-pilot was killed outright, the pilot wounded and rendered unconscious, the radio operator wounded and the plane severely damaged. Nevertheless, 2d Lt. Truemper and other members of the crew managed to right the plane and fly it back to their home station, where they contacted the control tower and reported the situation. 2d Lt. Truemper and the flight engineer volunteered to attempt to land the plane. Other members of the crew were ordered to jump, leaving 2d Lt. Truemper and the engineer aboard. After observing the distressed aircraft from another plane, 2d Lt. Truemper's commanding officer decided the damaged plane could not be landed by the inexperienced crew and ordered them to abandon it and parachute to safety. Demonstrating unsurpassed courage and heroism, 2d Lt. Truemper and the engineer replied that the pilot was still alive but could not be moved and that they would not desert him. They were then told to attempt a landing. After two unsuccessful efforts their plane crashed into an open field in a third attempt to land. 2d Lt. Truemper, the engineer, and the wounded pilot were killed.

== Honors ==
Seven streets have been named in Truemper's honor: one at Lackland Air Force Base, Texas; a second at Naval Station Great Lakes, Illinois; a third at Elmendorf Air Force Base, Alaska; a fourth at Yokota Air Base, Japan; one in Aurora, Illinois (as well as a statue there) a sixth at Mather Airport, part of the Sacramento County Department of Airports in Sacramento, California, which was previously Mather Air Force Base until September 1993 when it was closed due to BRAC action. And a seventh street at Whiteman AFB in Missouri.

== See also ==
- List of Medal of Honor recipients for World War II
