= 351st Missile Wing =

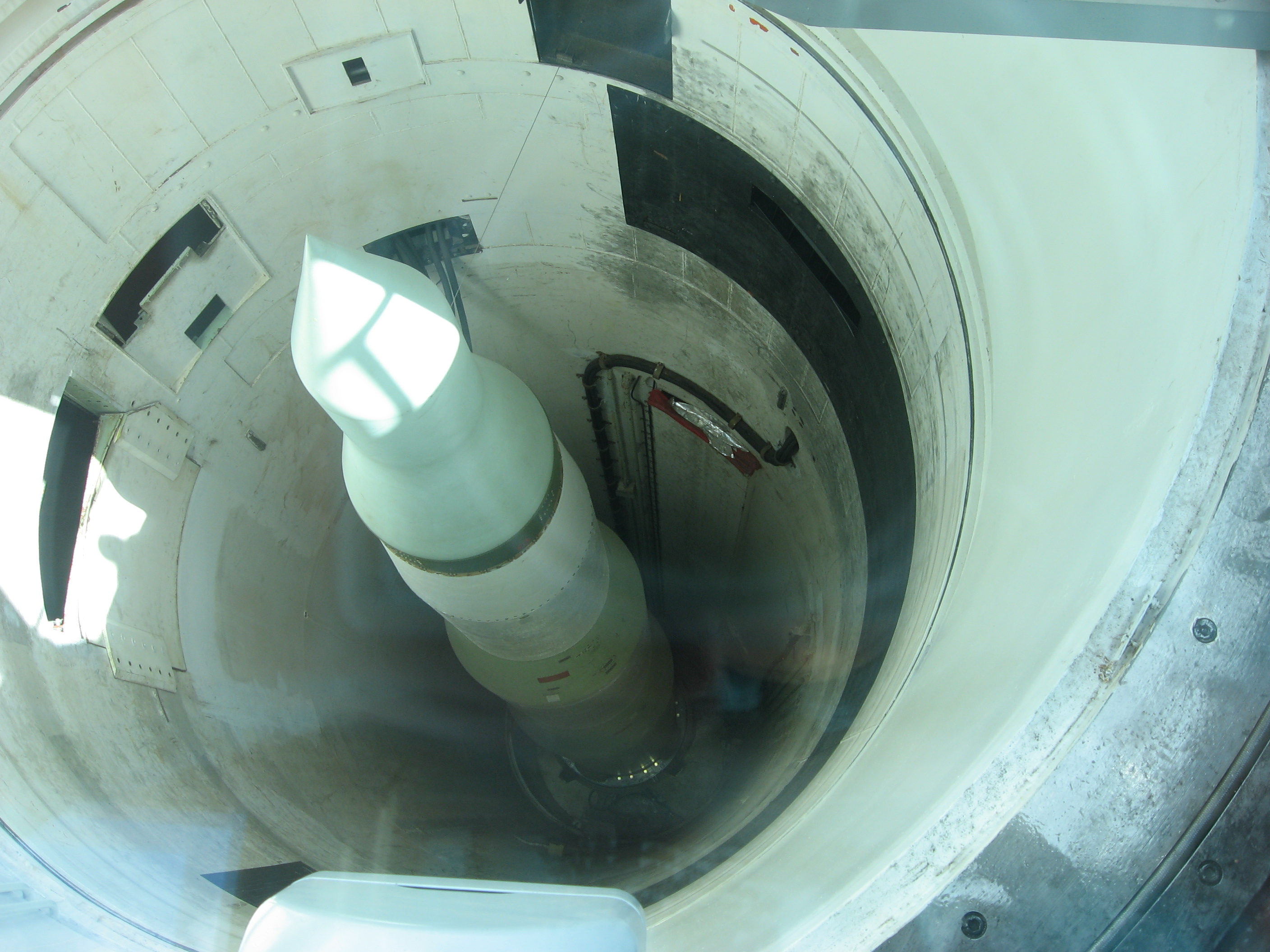
- Minuteman Missile in its silo
- Active: 1942–1945; 1947–1949; 1962–1995
- Country: United States
- Branch: United States Air Force
- Type: Missile Wing
- Role: Strategic Attack
- Motto: Sentinels of Peace
- Decorations: Distinguished Unit Citation; Air Force Outstanding Unit Award

Insignia
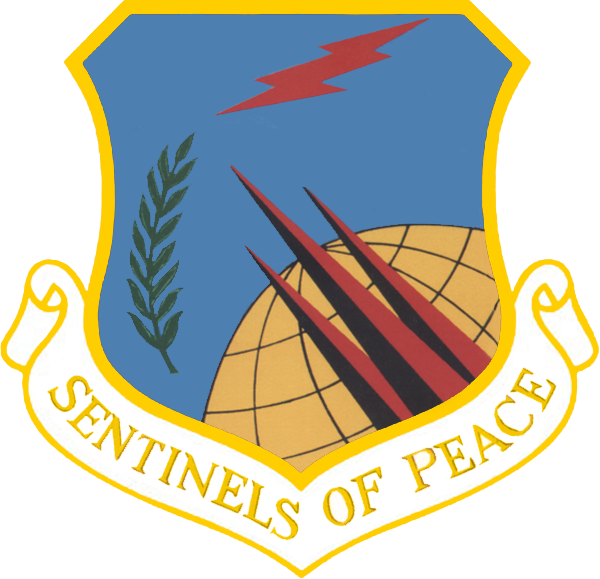
- 351st Missile Wing emblem (Note: Approved 7 February 1964. Description: Azure, issuant from sinister base a demi-sphere with axis bendwise Or, rimmed and grid-lined Sable, surmounted by three spires bendwise Gules and of the third [color], in chief a lightning bolt bend sinisterwise of the fourth [color], and in dexter flank an arched olive branch Vert, all within a diminished bordure of the second [color]. Significance: The wide expanse of blue sky with the small portion of the globe below represent the unit as guardian of many nations. It also signifies the global capability of the missile force and the heights from which the weapons system can strike. The three spires portray the alert, ever watchful and ready condition of the three assigned missile squadrons. The lightning bolt symbolizes the power, speed, and instantaneous reaction capability inherent in the unit's weapons system. The olive branch alludes to the preservation of the peace.)

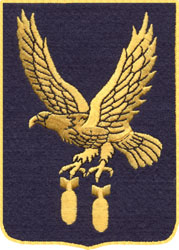
- Unofficial 351st Bombardment Group emblem
- Group tail marking (Note: A white triangle with a black J on camouflaged aircraft, a black triangle with a white J on uncamouflaged aircraft.): Triangle J

The 351st Missile Wing is an inactive United States Air Force unit, which was last based at Whiteman Air Force Base, Missouri. Assigned to Strategic Air Command for most of its existence, the wing maintained LGM-30F Minuteman II ICBMs in a state of readiness to fire, pursuant to any launch orders that might be received from the National Command Authority. It was inactivated in 1995.

During World War II, its predecessor unit, the 351st Bombardment Group was a VIII Bomber Command Boeing B-17 Flying Fortress unit. Flying from RAF Polebrook in Northamptonshire in early 1943, the group's 504th Bomb Squadron made 54 consecutive missions in June 1943 to January 1944 without losses. Two members of the 351st Bombardment Group, Second Lieutenant Walter E. Truemper and Staff Sergeant Archibald Mathies, were posthumously awarded the Medal of Honor for a mission to Leipzig, Germany, on 20 February 1944. Fellow crew member Carl Moore earned the Distinguished Service Cross for his actions during the mission. Additionally, the crew earned a Silver Star and seven Purple Hearts, which made them the most decorated B-17 crew of the Eighth Air Force in World War Two.

The 351st was also the unit to which Captain Clark Gable was assigned. (Note: A film of the unit's activities in the war, Combat America, featured Gable and was narrated by him. See: Combat America at the AFI Catalog of Feature Films.) Gable flew five combat missions, including one to Germany, as an observer-gunner in B-17 Flying Fortresses between 4 May and 23 September 1943, earning the Air Medal and the Distinguished Flying Cross for his efforts.

== History ==
=== World War II ===
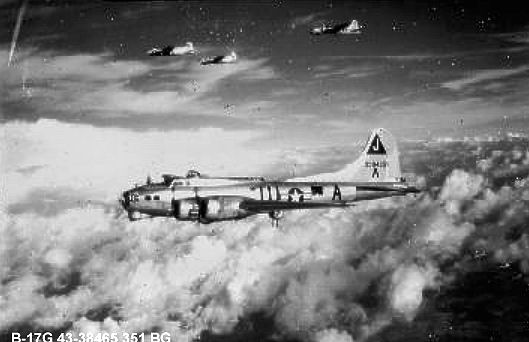
510th Bombardment Squadron B-17 (Note: Aircraft is Boeing B-17G-85-BO Flying Fortress, serial 43-38465, Favorite Lady. This aircraft survived 81 missions during the war and returned to USA on 12 June 1945. It was sold for scrap in July 1946. Baugher, Joe (1 September 2023). "1943 USAF Serial Numbers". Joe Baugher.)

The 351st Bombardment Group was activated 1 October 1942 at Salt Lake City AB, Utah. The group established at Geiger Field in Washington in November 1942 where the group was assembled for initial training, and the second phase of training was conducted at Biggs Field, Texas, between December 1942 and March 1943. The unit then moved to Pueblo AAB, Colorado for preparation for overseas movement. The ground unit left Pueblo for New York on 12 April 1943. The aircraft began movement on 1 April 1943. In April–May 1943, the unit moved to RAF Polebrook England to serve in combat with Eighth Air Force. It was assigned to the 94th Combat Wing, also at Polebrook. The group tail code was a "Triangle J".

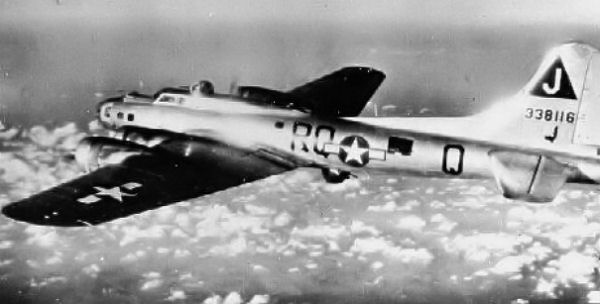
509th Bombardment Squadron B-17 (Note: Aircraft is Boeing B-17G-80-BO Flying Fortress, serial 43-38116, fuselage code RQ-Q, Classy Chassis. This plane crash landed at Polebrook returning from a mission on 2 March 1945 and was scrapped. Baugher, 1943 USAF Serial Numbers.)

The 351st's first completed combat mission took place on 14 May 1943, when 18 B-17's targeted a German Luftwaffe airfield at Kortrijk, Belgium. As the war progressed, the 351st operated primarily against strategic objectives in Germany, striking such targets as ball-bearing plants at Schweinfurt, communications at Mayen, marshalling yards at Koblenz, a locomotive and tank factory at Hanover, industries at Berlin, bridges at Cologne, an armaments factory at Mannheim, and oil refineries at Hamburg.

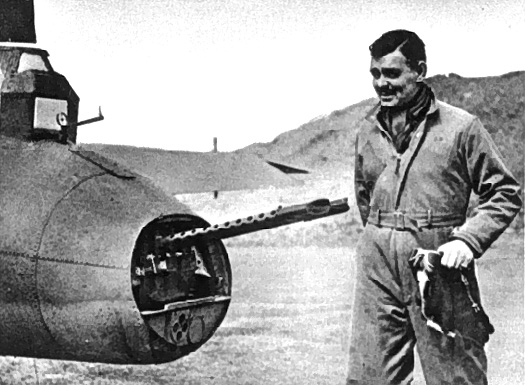
Clark Gable next to a B-17 in Britain, 1943

The group also struck harbor facilities, submarine installations, airfields, V-weapon sites, and power plants in France, Belgium, the Netherlands, and Norway.

The 351st Received a Distinguished Unit Citation (DUC) for performance on 9 October 1943, when an aircraft factory in Germany was accurately bombed in spite of heavy flak and pressing enemy interceptors. It received another DUC for its part in the successful attack of 11 January 1944, on aircraft factories in central Germany. The group participated in the intensive air campaign against the German aircraft industry during "Big Week", 20–25 February 1944.

In addition to its strategic missions, the group often operated in support of ground forces and attacked interdictory targets. Bombed in support of the Battle of Normandy in June 1944 and the Saint-Lô breakthrough in July. The group hit enemy positions to cover the airborne attack on the Netherlands in September 1944 and subsequently struck front-line positions, communications, and airfields to help stop the German counteroffensive in the Battle of the Bulge, December 1944 – January 1945. The 351st later flew missions in support of Operation Varsity, the airborne assault across the Rhine in March 1945.

The 351st conducted routine Eighth Air Force missions from RAF Polebrook until the end of the war. The unit completed 311 combat missions from Polebrook. The 351st lost 175 B-17's and their crews. The gunners in the group fired off 2,776,028 rounds of ammunition and were credited with destroying 303 enemy aircraft.

The group was redeployed to the US in May and June 1945. The first aircraft left on 21 May 1945. The ground unit sailed for the US on 25 June 1945, aboard the Queen Elizabeth. The ship docked in the US in July 1945, but the group was not inactivated until 28 August 1945.

=== Cold War ===
During the early years of the Cold War, the 351st Bombardment Group (Very Heavy) was reactivated for a short period between 1947 and 1949 as part of the reserves.

Later during the Cold War, the United States Air Force and Strategic Air Command established the 351st Strategic Missile Wing, which stood alert with Minuteman I and later, Minuteman II ICBMs starting in 1963 at Whiteman AFB, Missouri. The wing was bestowed the lineage, honors and history of the USAAF 351st Bomb Group of World War II upon activation.

The 351st supervised missile training operations and coordinated construction of SM-30B (later, LGM-30B) Minuteman I missile facilities from 1 February 1963, to 29 June 1964. The first missile arrived 14 January 1964 and was placed its silo two days later. The 508th Strategic Missile Squadron became combat ready on 5 June and the 509th on 10 June 1964. The last flight of the fifteen missiles was accepted 29 June 1964, making the 510th operational. The wing then had 150 fully operational missiles. Two-officer missile combat crews were deployed to each of the LCCs for 24-hour shifts. Meanwhile, the 340th Bombardment Wing phased down for inactivation and 351st Strategic Missile Wing gradually assumed host-wing responsibilities at Whiteman AFB, between 1 July and 1 September 1963. Later, the Wing converted to LGM-30F Minuteman II missiles between 7 May 1966, and 3 October 1967.

The wing won the Colonel Lee R. Williams Memorial Missile Trophy for Calendar Years 1965, 1967 and 1973, as well as the SAC missile combat competition and Blanchard Trophy in 1967, 1971, 1977, 1981, 1989, and 1993. It was named SAC's "Best Minuteman Wing" in 1972.

On 1 September 1991, the wing was redesignated as the 351st Missile Wing and implemented the objective wing organization. It was relieved from SAC in advance of SAC's disestablishment and reassigned to Eighth Air Force in the new Air Combat Command on 1 June 1992. It was again reassigned on 1 July 1993 to the Air Force Space Command and assigned to the new Twentieth Air Force. The same day, it relinquished "host wing" responsibilities for Whiteman AFB, transferring that role to Air Combat Command's 509th Bomb Wing, operating the B-2 Spirit strategic bomber.

The 351st Missile Wing and its three squadrons of Minuteman II ICBMs were inactivated on 31 July 1995 as a result of planned phaseout of the Minuteman II.

== Lineage ==
351st Bombardment Group

- Constituted as the 351st Bombardment Group (Heavy) on 25 September 1942

Activated on 1 October 1942

- Redesignated 351st Bombardment Group, Heavy on 11 August 1944

Inactivated on 28 August 1945

- Redesignated 351st Bombardment Group, Very Heavy

Activated on 9 April 1947
Inactivated on 27 June 1949

- Consolidated with the 351st Strategic Missile Wing as the 351st Strategic Missile Wing on 31 January 1984

351st Missile Wing

- Established as 351st Strategic Missile Wing (ICBM—Minuteman) and activated, on 9 August 1962

Organized on 1 February 1963

- Consolidated with the 351st Bombardment Group on 31 January 1984

Redesignated as 351st Missile Wing on 1 September 1991
Inactivated on 31 July 1995

=== Assignments ===
- II Bomber Command, 1 October 1942 – 12 April 1943
- 1st Bombardment Wing, May 1943 (attached to 101st Provisional Combat Bombardment Wing until 13 September 1943)
- 94th Combat Bombardment Wing, 1 November 1943 – 23 June 1945
- Army Service Forces (for inactivation), – 28 July August 1945
- Tenth Air Force, 9 April 1947
- 96th Bombardment Wing (later 96th Air Division, c. 12 June 1947 – 27 June 1949
- Strategic Air Command, 9 August 1962 (not organized)
- 17th Strategic Aerospace Division (later 17th Strategic Missile Division, 17th Strategic Aerospace Division), 1 February 1963
- 4th Strategic Missile Division (later 4th Air Division), 30 June 1971
- 40th Air Division, 1 July 1973
- 19th Air Division, 1 December 1982
- Eighth Air Force, 13 June 1988
- 100th Air Division, 1 July 1990
- Eighth Air Force, 26 July 1991
- Twentieth Air Force, 1 September 1991 – 31 July 1995

=== Units ===
Groups

- 351st Operations Group, 1 September 1991 – 31 July 1995

Squadrons

- 508th Bombardment (later Strategic Missile, Missile) Squadron, 1 October 1942 – 28 August 1945; 15 October 1947 – 27 June 1949; 1 May 1963 – 1 September 1991
- 509th Bombardment (later Strategic Missile, Missile) Squadron, 1 October 1942 – 28 August 1945; 9 May 1947 – 3 May 1948; 1 June 1963 – 1 September 1991
- 510th Bombardment (later Strategic Missile, Missile) Squadron, 1 October 1942 – 28 August 1945; 15 September 1947 – 3 May 1948; 1 June 1963 – 1 September 1991
- 511th Bombardment Squadron, 1 October 1942 – 28 August 1945; 15 October 1947 – 27 June 1949

=== Stations ===
- Salt Lake City Army Air Base, Utah, 1 October 1942
- Geiger Field, Washington, November 1942
- Biggs Field, Texas, December 1942
- Pueblo Army Air Base, Colorado, c. 1 March – c. 12 April 1943
- RAF Polebrook (AAF-110), England, c. 1 May 1943 – June 1945
- Sioux Falls Army Air Field, South Dakota, – 28 July August 1945
- Scott Field, Illinois, 9 April 1947 – 27 June 1949
- Whiteman Air Force Base, Missouri, 1 February 1963 – 31 July 1995

=== Aircraft and missiles ===
- B-17 Flying Fortress, 1942–1995
- B-29 Superfortress, 1947–1949
- LGM-30B Minuteman I, 1963–1967
- LGM-30F Minuteman II, 1966–1995

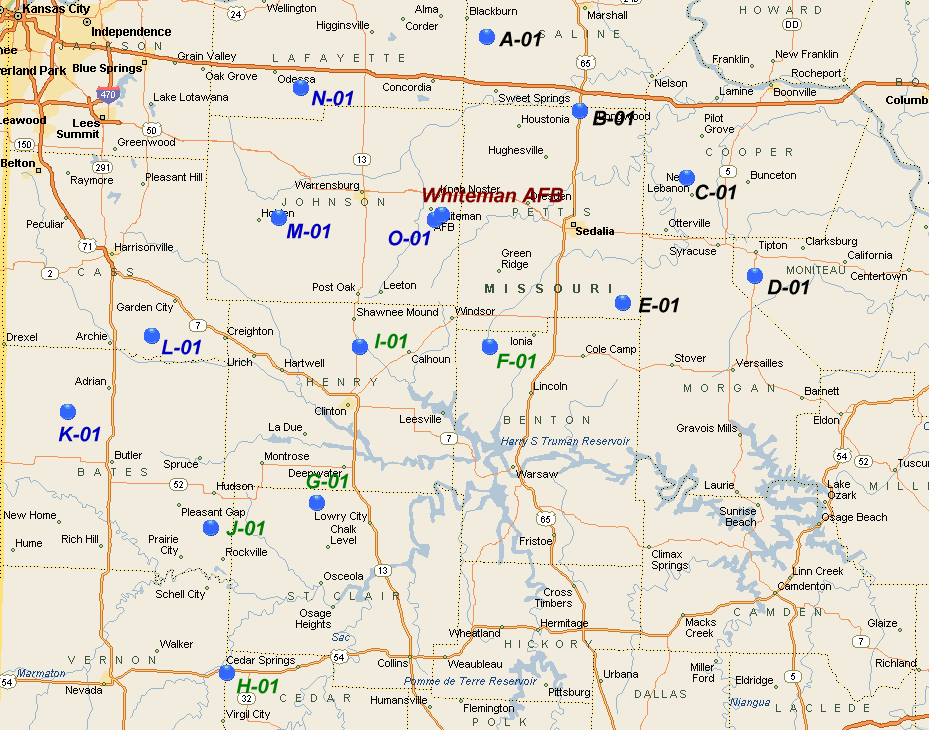
LGM-30 Minuteman Missile Alert Facilities 508 MS (black) 509 MS (green) 510 MS (blue)

LGM-30F Minuteman III Missile Alert Facilities (MAF) (each controlling 10 missiles) are located as follows: (Note: The map of missile sites incorrectly indicates the flights in the 509th and 510th Squadrons. The list below is correct.)

508th Missile Squadron

A-01 3.5 mi SE of Blackburn MO, 39°04′05″N 093°26′20″W
B-01 38.1 mi ExNE of Houstonia MO, 38°55′38″N 093°12′41″W
C-01 5.6 mi SxSW of Pilot Grove MO, 38°47′59″N 092°57′05″W
D-01 6.1 mi SE of Syracuse MO, 38°36′45″N 092°47′15″W
E-01 7.3 mi WxSW of Florence MO, 38°33′46″N 093°06′33″W

509th Missile Squadron

G-01 7.4 mi WxNW of Lowry City MO, 38°11′00″N 093°51′07″W
H-01 2.8 mi WxSW of Eldorado Springs MO 37°51′36″N 094°03′59″W
J-01 4.7 mi NxNW of Rockville MO, 38°08′10″N 094°06′27″W
K-01 6.3 mi WxSW of Adrian MO, 38°21′16″N 094°27′16″W
L-01 8.8 mi NE of Adrian MO, 38°29′55″N 094°15′10″W

510th Missile Squadron

F-01 6.0 mi SE of Windsor MO, 38°28′48″N 093°26′00″W
I-01 6.7 mi W of Calhoun MO, 38°28′48″N 093°44′55″W
M-01 32.6 mi ExNE of Holden MO, 38°43′30″N 093°56′40″W
N-01 3.9 mi ExSE of Odessa MO, 38°58′14″N 093°53′32″W
*O-01 On Whiteman AFB, MO 38°43′14″N 093°33′56″W

*Preserved, but not open to the public.

== See also ==
- 351st Missile Wing LGM-30 Minuteman Missile Launch Sites
