= V. A. Pusey =

American politician from Washington state

Virgil A. Pusey
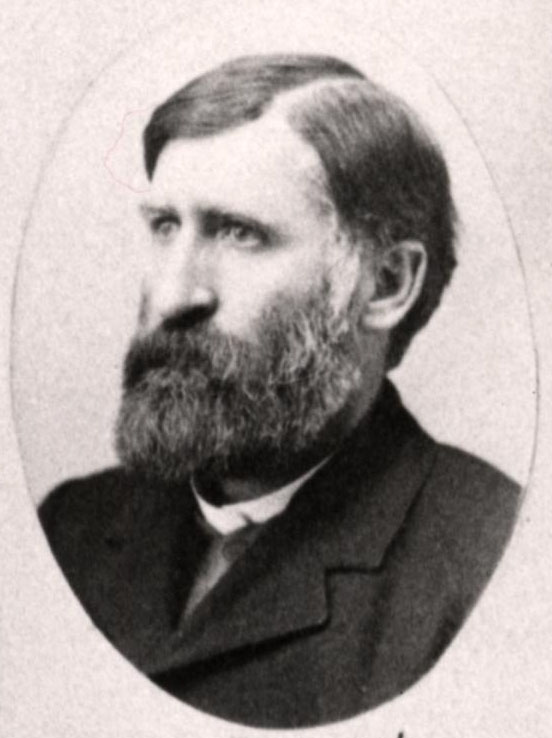
- Pusey in 1895

Member of the Washington State Senate for the 29th district
- In office 1895–1899
- Preceded by: W. C. Rutter

Personal details
- Born: November 27, 1853 Champaign County, Illinois, U.S.
- Died: October 10, 1897 (aged 43)
- Resting place: Lake View Cemetery, Seattle, Washington
- Party: Republican

Virgil A. Pusey (1853–1897) was a Republican politician in the state of Washington. He served in the Washington State Senate from 1895 to 1899. In 1878, in St. Louis, Missouri, he married Amanda Minerva Pusey (1857–1943) from his birthplace, Champaign, Illinois.
