= Answer Before Dark =

1930 novel by Elizabeth Moorhead

- Author: Elizabeth Moorhead
- Language: English
- Genre: Novel of manners
- Publisher: Bobbs-Merrill Company
- Publication date: 1930
- Publication place: United States
- Media type: Print (hardback)
- Pages: 381
- OCLC: 1592382

Answer Before Dark is a novel of manners by the American author Elizabeth Moorhead, set in 1920s Pittsburgh, Pennsylvania. It was her second novel, published by the Bobbs-Merrill Company in 1930. She adapted it into a stage play in 1931.

== Plot ==
It tells the story of Mary Ann, daughter of an upper-middle-class family, who tries to defer her socially acceptable marriage proposal in order to pursue her dream of being a painter.

== Reception ==
The Los Angeles Times wrote that Answer Before Dark improved upon the plot progression from Moorhead's previous novel, Clouded Hills, and praised the writing in general, but felt that it suffered in the quality of character writing and had excess melodrama. The Buffalo News called it a "significant novel", praising its sense of pathos, irony, and tragedy.
