= Quest Skinner =

American mixed media artist

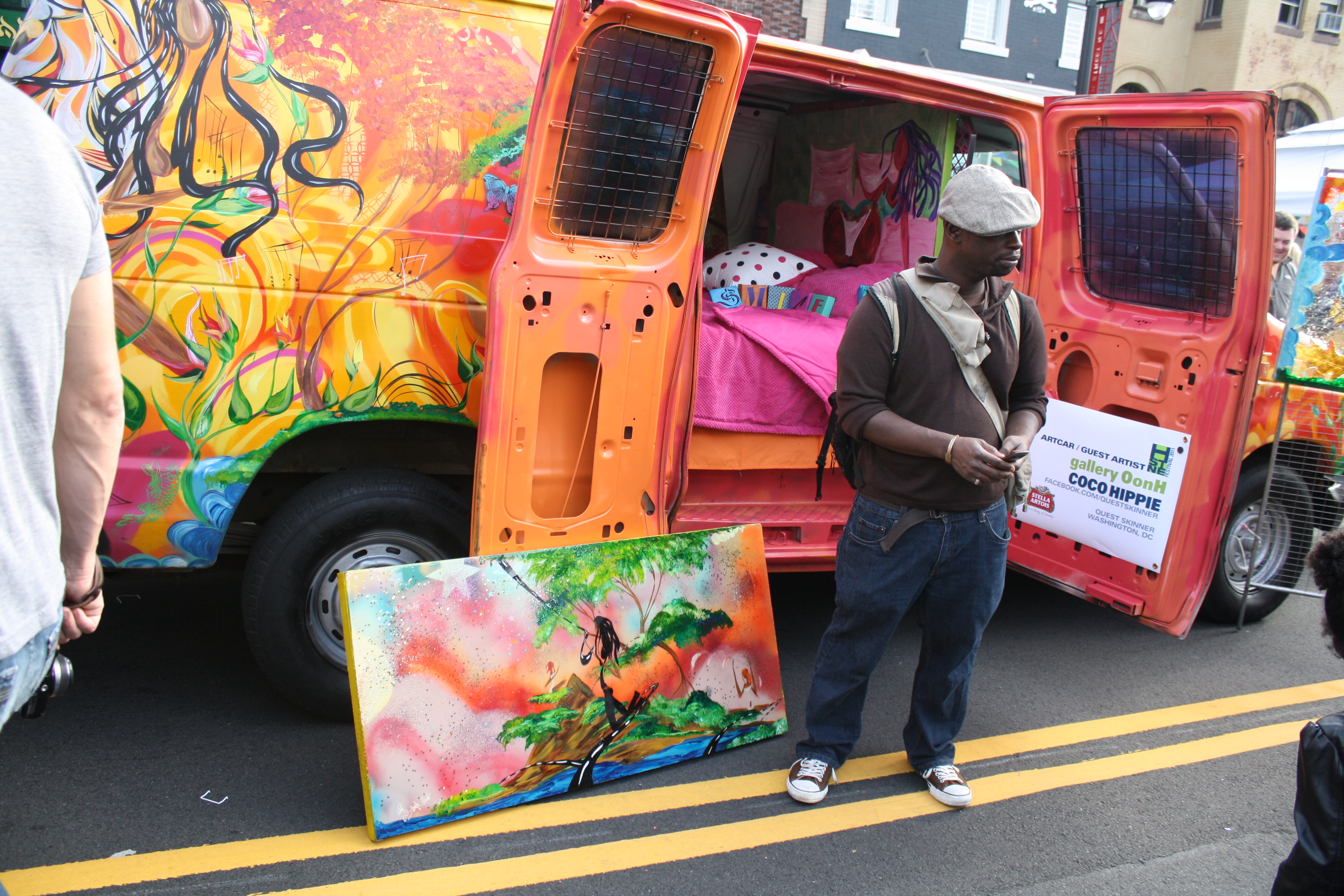
- Born: 1978 (age 47–48); Pittsburgh, Pennsylvania
- Occupation: Artist
- Known for: Mixed-media artist
- Awards: Steve Kramer Award for Community Service

Quest Skinner (born 1978) is an American mixed media artist, teacher, and activist. Currently living in Washington, D. C., her work is influenced by the people, music, and city life she encounters. Skinner is an active participant in national and regional Burning Man events.

== Early life ==
Skinner was born in Pittsburgh, PA. She is of African American and Native American descent. Genealogical research has shown that her family is of African American descent and Cherokee, Chickasaw, Choctaw, Iroquois, Piscataway, and Shinnecock ancestry. When she was 16, she and her mother moved to Arizona. It was in Arizona where she chose Quest as her name.

== Career ==
Skinner began her career as an artist in Washington, D.C.. She began as a painter but has since branched out into a mixed media artist. She is a muralist and a sculptor as well. Whenever possible, Skinner utilizes, sustainable, non-invasive materials in her art. Her work has been displayed at the National Museum of Women in the Arts, and The Prince George's County African American Museum and Culture Center (PGAAMCC). She was commissioned to paint murals for the Metropolitan Branch Trail, and the “Edgewood 2 the Edge of the World” mural at the Rhode Island Plaza, in Washington, D. C.

== Burning Man ==
Skinner has been an active member of the Burning Man community both nationally and as a member of the DC Burner community. Over the years, Skinner has taken on various roles from assistant to lead on multiple effigies and temples for the Mid-Atlantic Burner community, as well as, being Art Director for different theme camps both in Black Rock City and at Regional Burns.

== Awards ==
In 2014, Skinner won the Steve Kramer Award for Community Service from Artspace.
