= Michael Lotenero =

American artist (born 1967)

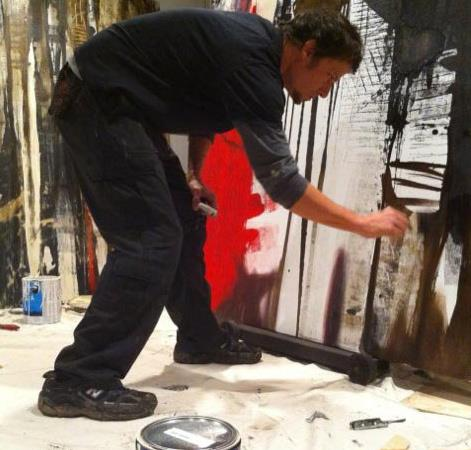
Michael Lotenero

Michael Lotenero (born March 31, 1967) is an American artist, graphic designer, illustrator, and musician who emerged from the Pittsburgh art scene. He is known for his figurative abstracts, sculptures, and iconic heads.

== Early life and career ==
Michael Lotenero was born in Cleveland, Ohio and was raised there and Miami, Florida. In 1985 he graduated from Kirtland High School in Ohio. In 1988 he graduated from The Art Institute of Pittsburgh where he majored in Graphic Design and Illustration. It is in Pittsburgh where Lotenero became immersed in the post-punk scene, a period that would come to influence much of his later work.

Upon graduation, from the Art Institute, Lotenero started the boutique design firm, 96 Eyes Design, with Rick Bach and David Zimmerly. The firm was the recipient of several Addy awards, and was recognized by Print Magazine Regional Design Annual. Rick Bach, David Zimmerly, and Michael Lotenero were also the members of cow punk band The Cavemen from Oklahoma, playing shows at The Electric Banana, Art Without Walls, and the Carnegie Museum of Arts Hall of Architecture.

After the firm and group disbanded in 1993, Lotenero went on to form Michael Lotenero Art + Design.

== Art ==
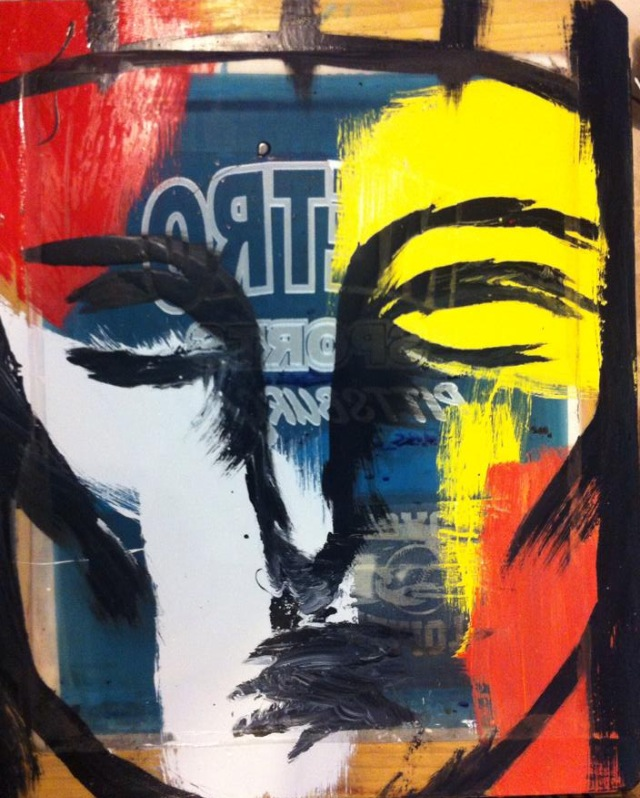
Lotenero's Iconic Head

Michael Lotenero’s first exhibition was at the Mendelson Gallery in Pittsburgh, Pa in 1989. This was followed by a solo show at The Westmoreland Museum of American Art in 1993, and shows at The Carnegie Museum of Art, and other galleries in Pittsburgh and around the country. During this time in his career he was represented by the LaFond Gallery and James Gallery.

Lotenero was the creator and producer of "Transmission" a quarterly fine art collection of Pittsburgh artists. Each edition featured 50 pieces of original art and was sold through local bookstores. Editions are currently on file at The Carnegie Library.

Influenced by early Dadaist, Marcel Duchamp and The Situationist's International Guy Debord, Michael Lotenero spent several years, starting in 1992, producing art under the assumed identity "Monsignor Impala". During this time he created works from repurposed or modified thrift store paintings and objects.

In 2001 Lotenero collaborated on the film installation project “Navarro” with Jose Muniain. It debuted at Pittsburgh Filmmakers and was a finalist in the D.C. Independent Film Festival. It also appeared at The Austin Museum of Digital Art, The Urban Institute of Contemporary Art, and The Mattress Factory.

In 2012 Michael Lotenero moved into a studio in Pittsburgh's Historic Strip District in a storefront space that was originally a speakeasy and brothel. He is represented by Craighead Green Gallery in Dallas, the Bill Lowe Gallery in Atlanta, The Morrison Gallery in Connecticut, The Marshall Gallery in Scottsdale, Arizona and Farmboy Fine Arts in Vancouver, and exhibits his work throughout the country.

== Graphic design ==
Lotenero's graphic design and illustration work appeared in Time, The Wall Street Journal, HOW, Graphis, London's Computer Arts, Big, Pittsburgh, Surfing, and Pitt Med. He worked with art directors David Carson and Martin Venezky of Appetite Engineers, with pieces appearing in David Carson's Trek, Marshall Mcluhan's The Book of Probes, Ray Gun, and Speak. Lotenero has created graphics for The New York Pro Show in New York City, The Quiksilver ProFrance Surf Competition, and the Museum of Contemporary Art San Diego. He is the illustrator for Eva Nagorski's The Down and Dirty Dish on Revenge, and Eva Christina's The Book of Kink.

In 2010, the Consol Energy Center in Pittsburgh commissioned Lotenero to create several large scale murals.

== Personal life ==
Lotenero divides his time between Pittsburgh, Pennsylvania and Brooklyn, New York. He has two children.

Lotenero is on the board of Sunflower Power, a Pittsburgh organization for women in recovery, and helps organize their charity art event.

He is also the vocalist for Chupacabra, a Pittsburgh art rock band that has performed in such venues as The Rex Theater, The Heinz History Center, and The Gibson Guitar Showroom/CMJ Music Marathon/NYC.
