= Frank Cunimondo =

- Born: 1934 (age 91–92); Pittsburgh, Pennsylvania, United States
- Genres: Jazz, salsa, bossa nova
- Occupations: Musician, songwriter
- Instruments: Piano, keyboards
- Years active: 1960s–present
- Labels: Mondo Records; Sound Idea; Underonesun; Movieplay Music
- Website: Official website

Frank Cunimondo (born 1934) is an American jazz pianist and educator based in Pittsburgh, Pennsylvania. In addition to performing, Cunimondo has taught at Duquesne University and the University of Pittsburgh
