= Marcel Kanarek =

Polish chess grandmaster (born 1993)

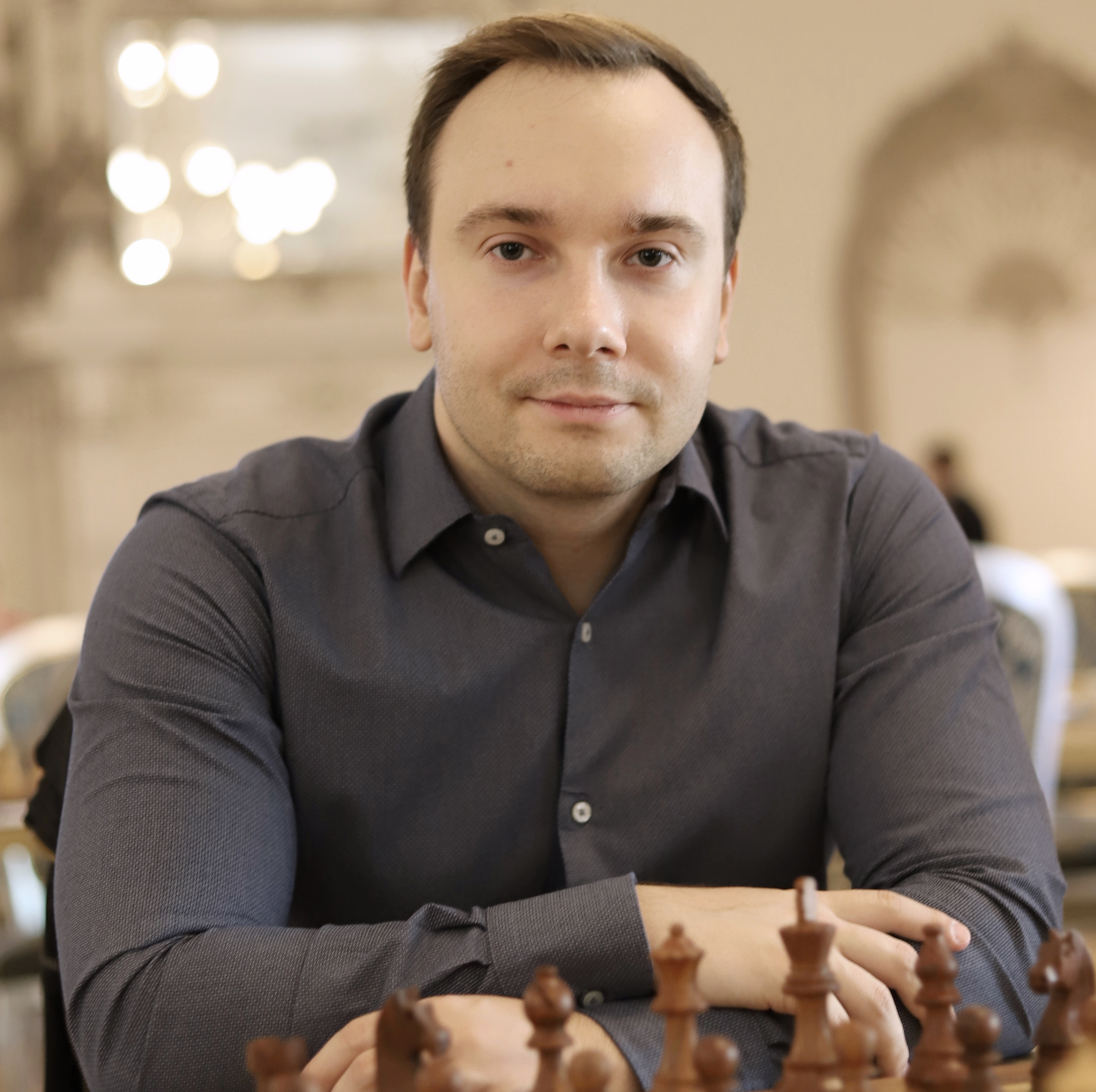
- Marcel Kanarek in 2021

Personal information
- Born: 5 February 1993 (age 33) Koszalin, Poland

Chess career
- Country: Poland
- Title: Grandmaster (2016)
- FIDE rating: 2478 (July 2026)
- Peak rating: 2548 (July 2016)

Marcel Kanarek (born 5 February 1993) is a Polish chess grandmaster (2016).

== Biography ==
In his career, Marcel Kanarek has won five individual medals in Polish Youth Chess Championship: gold (Chotowa 2009 - in the U16 age group), three silver (Bęsia 2006 and Turawa 2007 - both in the U14 age group, Murzasichle 2011 - in the U18 age group) and bronze (Kołobrzeg 2002 - in the U10 age group). He represented Poland many times in European Youth Chess Championships and World Youth Chess Championships, winning silver medals twice, in 2007 (Antalya - World Youth Chess Championship in U14 age group) and 2011 (Albena - European Youth Chess Championship in U18 age group).

Marcel Kanarek is a three-time medalist of the European Youth Team Chess Championship in U18 age group: twice gold (Pardubice 2010, Iași 2011) and silver (Pardubice 2009).

In 2007, Marcel Kanarek took third place in the international open chess tournaments played in Novi Sad, Mielno and twice in Koszalin. In 2009, he was awarded the 1st place (together with Vadim Shishkin, Klaudiusz Urban and Mirosław Grabarczyk) in the Memorial of Józef Kochana in Koszalin. At the turn of 2011 and 2012, he won the round-robin tournament Comarch Cup in Kraków, while at the turn of 2014 and 2015 - he shared the first place in Kraków tournament Cracovia (together with, among others Oleksandr Zubov).

In 2010, Marcel Kanarek was awarded the FIDE International Master (IM) title and received the FIDE Grandmaster (WM) title five years later. He achieved the highest rating in his career so far on July 1, 2016, with a score of 2548 points, he was then ranked 20th among Polish chess players.
