= Guaranteed Irish (band) =

Guaranteed Irish is an American folk band from Pittsburgh, Pennsylvania, currently consisting of Bruce Foley, Patrick Folan and Jimmy Lamb. To date they have released three albums and are classified as an Irish folk band.

== History ==
Bruce Foley met Patrick Folan in the late 1970s and the two played their first gig together. They played at a fundraiser for the local GAA. Jimmy Lamb joined the group in the late 1980s and the three have been together ever since.

== Performances and Tours ==
The band mainly plays local performances in and around the Pittsburgh area but has also toured throughout the United States and Ireland. Annually since 2006 they have done a cruise with Isle Inn Tours called Ireland at Sea and in January 2010 they joined fellow artists Seamus Kennedy, Fiona Molloy, Harry O'Donoghue on the cruise ship.

=== Notable Performances in the United States ===
- The Pittsburgh Irish Festival (1991–present)
- Riverstone Concert Series, Foxburg PA
- Opened for The Irish Rovers at the A.J Palumbo Center
- Monday Night Football at Heinz Field
- The American Ireland Fund dinner Sponsored by the Pittsburgh Steelers(2003–present)
- Opened for An Evening with Seamus Heaney (2004)
- Several performances with Dave Hanner of Corbin/Hanner

=== Notable Performances in Ireland ===
- 3 Tours of Ireland (1992–2008) playing in Belfast, Crossmaglen, Tuam, Clifden, Cleggan, Roundstone, County Galway, Bray
- Featured in the Summerfest Festival, Roundstone, Co. Galway (2008)
- The Clifden Arts Festival with John Sheehan of The Dubliners

=== Solo Performances ===
- Bruce Foley played at Madison Square Gardens for Pete Seeger's 90th Birthday (May 3, 2009) and is a member of Tommy Sands (Irish folk singer) and his Irish Band when he tours the United States.

== Members ==
=== Current ===
Bruce Foley- vocals, Uilleann pipes, acoustic guitar, tin whistle, low whistle, bodhrán (1975–present)

Patrick Folan- vocals, button accordion, harmonica (1975–present)

Jimmy Lamb- vocals, bass guitar (1985–present)

=== Guest Members ===
Deke Kincaid - Drum Kit, Djembe, and Percussion (1999–present)

== Discography ==
=== Albums ===
Out in Front (1991)*

Live (1993)

We Won't Come Home 'Til Morning (2008)

All three albums were recorded with the record label, Killary Productions.

=== Contributions ===
It's All In the Song: A Tribute to Andy M. Stewart (2006)
