= Frank Bucci =

American soccer player (born 1956)

Personal information
- Date of birth: December 17, 1956 (age 69)
- Place of birth: Pittsburgh, Pennsylvania, U.S.
- Position: Goalkeeper

Youth career
- 1974–1977: Pittsburgh Panthers

Senior career*
Years	Team	Apps	(Gls)
1978	Connecticut Yankees	14	(0)
1979	Columbus Magic		
1978–1980	Pittsburgh Spirit (indoor)	6	(0)
1980	New York United		
1980–1981	Denver Avalanche (indoor)	18	(0)
- * Club domestic league appearances and goals

Frank Bucci is an American retired soccer goalkeeper who spent three seasons in the American Soccer League and two in the Major Indoor Soccer League

Bucci attended the University of Pittsburgh where he played on the men's soccer team from 1974 to 1977. In 1978, he played for the Connecticut Yankees of the American Soccer League. He moved to the Columbus Magic for the 1979 season. He also played for the Pittsburgh Spirit of the Major Indoor Soccer League. He later played for the Denver Avalanche. At some point in his career, he also played for Pittsburgh Beadling.

He has coached the Bishop Watterson High School boys' soccer team.
