= Archibald Mathies =

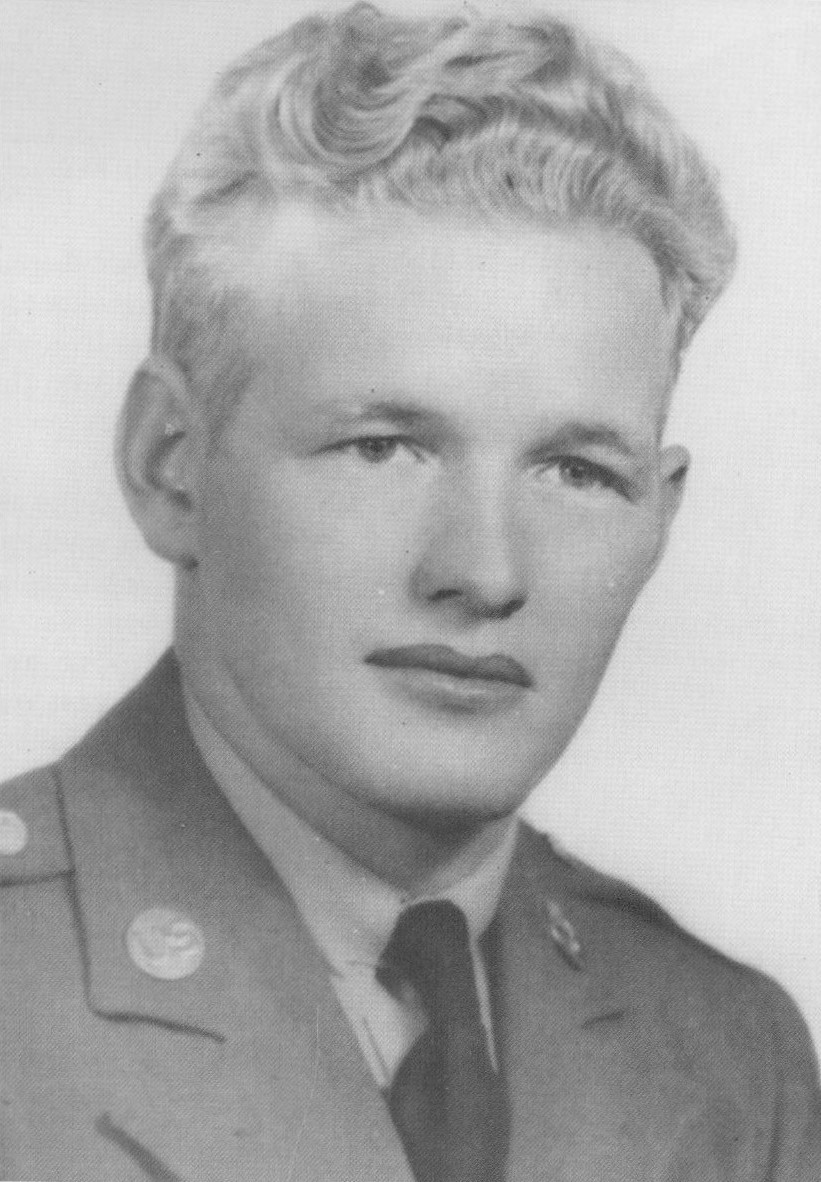
- Born: June 3, 1918; Stonehouse, Scotland, UK
- Died: February 20, 1944 (aged 25); Polebrook, England, UK
- Burial place: Finleyville Cemetery, Finleyville, Pennsylvania, U.S.
- Military career
- Allegiance: United States of America
- Branch: United States Army Air Forces
- Service years: 1940 – 1944
- Rank: Staff Sergeant
- Units: 510th Bombardment Squadron, 351st Bombardment Group
- Conflicts: World War II
- Awards: Medal of Honor; Purple Heart; Air Medal

Archibald Mathies (June 3, 1918 – February 20, 1944) posthumously received the Medal of Honor as an enlisted member of the U.S. Army Air Forces during World War II.

== Biography ==
=== Childhood ===
Born Archibald Collins Hamilton, June 3, 1918, in Stonehouse, South Lanarkshire, Scotland, he emigrated with his mother and step-father to Pittsburgh, Pennsylvania in the United States.

=== Military career ===
Archibald Mathies enlisted in the Regular Army on December 30, 1940, at Pittsburgh, Penn. He was attached to Headquarters and Headquarters Squadron, 8th Pursuit Wing, and later assigned to the 36th Air Base Group, Maxwell Field, Alabama. On March 5, 1941, he was transferred to the 31st School Squadron, Jefferson Barracks, Mo., where he remained until March 24, 1941. He then was attached to the 36th School Squadron, Chanute Field, Illinois, where he attended the Airplane Mechanic School, from which he graduated on October 1, 1941.

He departed Chanute Field and proceeded to Mitchel Field, New York, where he served with the 1st Air Support Command and later the 33d Pursuit Group. He was transferred as a member of the 33d Pursuit Group to Morris Field, North Carolina, on December 4, 1941. On February 6, 1943, he was attached to the Army Air Forces Flexible Gunnery School at Tyndall Field, Florida, and completed the course in aerial gunnery on March 22, 1943. He then returned to Morris Field and served with the 1st Air Service Command until April 12, 1943, when he was assigned to the 73d Observation Group at Godman Field, Kentucky. On April 14, 1943, he joined the 91st Observation squadron (redesignated 91st Reconnaissance Squadron) at Godman Field. From July 25 to September 7, 1943, he was attached to the 28th Bombardment Squadron, 19th Bombardment Group, at Pyote, Texas, and from September 15 to November 22, 1943, he served with the 796th Bombardment Squadron at Alexandria, La.

He departed the United States on December 8, 1943, and arrived in England on December 16. Upon his arrival, he was assigned to the 8th Air Force Replacement Depot Casual Pool and was subsequently attached to the 1st Replacement and Training Squadron until January 18, 1944. On January 19, 1944, he was assigned to the 510th Bomb Squadron, 351st Bomb Group, based at RAF Polebrook, England, as an Engineer-Gunner. He was promoted to staff sergeant February 17, 1944.

(Taken from U.S. Air Force Biography)

=== Medal of Honor mission ===
On his second combat mission, on February 20, 1944, Sergeant Mathies participated in an attack on Leipzig, Germany. During this raid, along with 2d Lt. Walter E. Truemper aboard B-17G 42-21763, Markings TU:A, nicknamed Ten Horsepower, the co-pilot was killed and the pilot severely injured. Mathies and the navigator flew the crippled plane back to England, where the rest of the crew jumped (parachuted) to safety. Mathies and the navigator were ordered to jump, but both refused to leave the pilot behind. After some indecision, they were permitted to attempt a landing. The plane crashed into an open field on the third attempt, killing Sgt. Mathies and the navigator. The wounded pilot survived the crash but later died in the hospital.

== Medal of Honor citation ==
=== Medal of Honor citation ===
Citation:

For conspicuous gallantry and intrepidity at risk of life above and beyond the call of duty in action against the enemy in connection with a bombing mission over enemy-occupied Europe on February 20, 1944. The aircraft on which Sgt. Mathies was serving as flight engineer and ball turret gunner was attacked by a squadron of enemy fighters with the result that the co-pilot was killed outright, the pilot wounded and rendered unconscious, the radio operator wounded and the plane severely damaged. Nevertheless, Sgt. Mathies and other members of the crew managed to right the plane and fly it back to their home station, where they contacted the control tower and reported the situation. Sgt. Mathies and the navigator volunteered to attempt to land the plane. Other members of the crew were ordered to jump, leaving Sgt. Mathies and the navigator aboard. After observing the distressed aircraft from another plane, Sgt. Mathies' commanding officer decided the damaged plane could not be landed by the inexperienced crew and ordered them to abandon it and parachute to safety. Demonstrating unsurpassed courage and heroism, Sgt. Mathies and the navigator replied that the pilot was still alive but could not be moved and they would not desert him. They were then told to attempt a landing. After two unsuccessful efforts, the plane crashed into an open field in a third attempt to land. Sgt. Mathies, the navigator, and the wounded pilot were killed.

== Awards and decorations ==
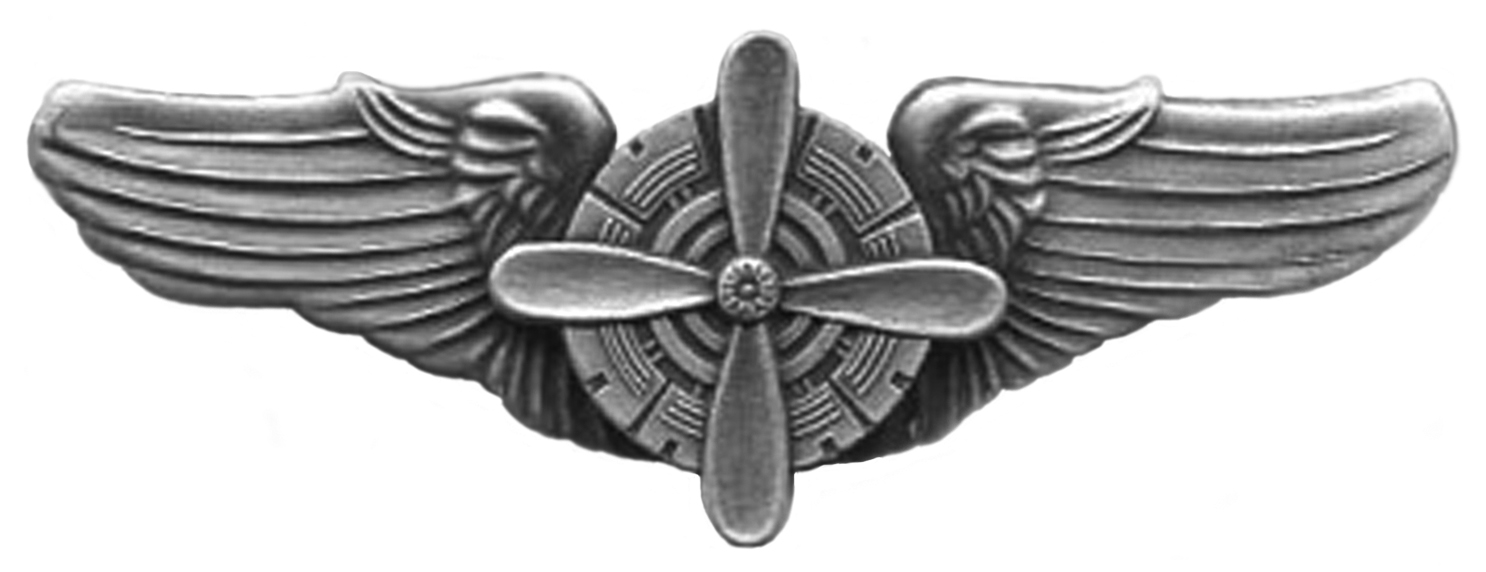

Badge	USAAF Flight Engineer badge		
1st row	Medal of Honor		Purple Heart
2nd row	Air Medal	Army Good Conduct Medal	American Defense Service Medal
3rd row	American Campaign Medal	European–African–Middle Eastern Campaign Medalwith one Campaign star	World War II Victory Medal

== Other honors ==
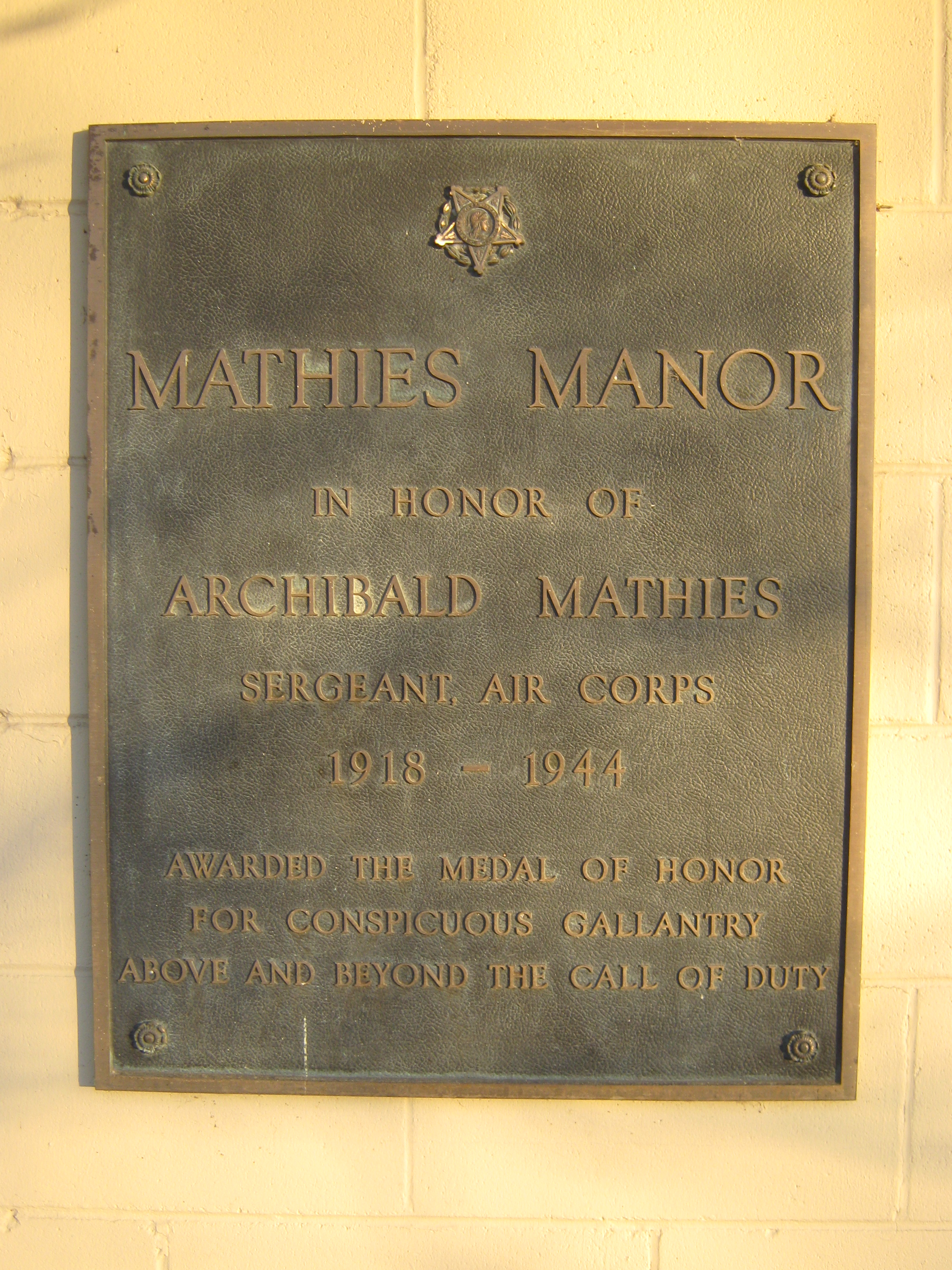
Plaque at Mathies Manor

One of the Temporary Lodging units at Joint Base Anacostia-Bolling is named in his honor.

The Airman Leadership School at RAF Feltwell, UK is named in his honor.

The Noncommissioned Officer Academy at RAF Upwood, UK was named in his honor.

The Noncommissioned Officer Academy at Keesler AFB, MS is named in his honor.

The bridge on Truemper Drive crossing Military Highway at Lackland Air Force Base, TX is named in his honor.

The USCIS Dallas District Office is named in his honor.

Exit 48 on the Mon-Fayette Expressway/ PA Route 43 is named in his honor.

The Mathies Coal Company in Pittsburgh, PA was named in his honor.

Archibald Mathies' Medal of Honor is on display at the National WWII Museum in New Orleans, Louisiana.

== See also ==
- List of Medal of Honor recipients for World War II
