= Marilyn Bracken =

American chemist

- Born: November 5, 1935 (age 90); Pittsburgh, Pennsylvania, U.S.
- Education: Carnegie Mellon University; American University
- Occupation: Chemist

Marilyn Bracken (born November 5, 1935) is an American chemist.

== Life and career ==
Bracken was born in Pittsburgh, Pennsylvania on November 5, 1935. She attended Carnegie Mellon University, earning her BS degree in chemistry in 1957. After earning her degree, she worked as a chemist at Melpar from 1957 to 1958, and was a chemist at the United States National Bureau of Standards from 1962 to 1964. She attended the American University, earning her MA degree in 1967 and her PhD degree in public administration in 1971.

From 1977 to 1978, Bracken served as head of the energy and environmental information systems at Mitre Corporation, and from 1980, she served as associate assistant administrator for toxics integration of the United States Environmental Protection Agency (EPA) until her resignation in 1982. During her time at EPA, in 1981, she was named a fellow of the American Association for the Advancement of Science.

From 1988 to 1991, Bracken served as president of Metcalf and Eddy, a wasterwaster engineering firm. In 2002, she was named a fellow of the Society of American Military Engineers.
