= W. C. Rutter =

American politician

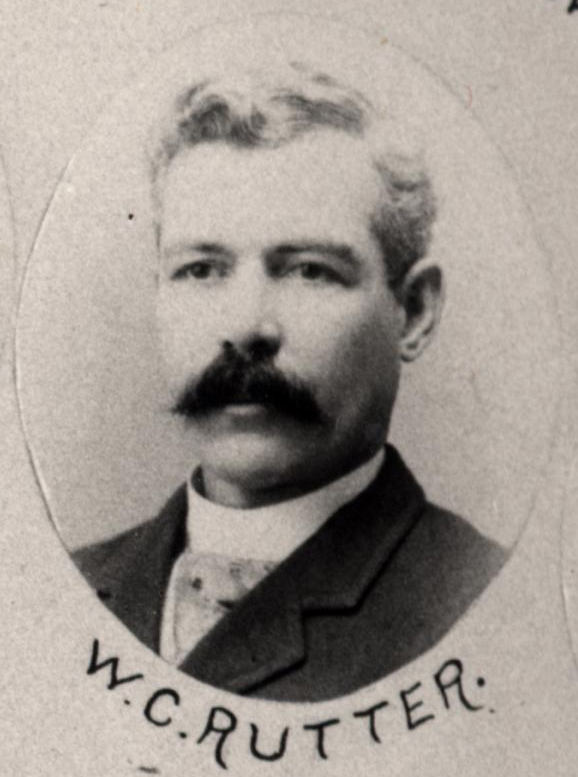
- Rutter in 1891

Member of the Washington Senate from the 29th district
- In office January 7, 1891 – January 14, 1895
- Preceded by: Constituency established
- Succeeded by: Virgil A. Pusey

Member of the Washington House of Representatives
- In office November 6, 1889 – January 7, 1891
- Preceded by: Position established
- Succeeded by: Position abolished

Personal details
- Born: Washington Clark Rutter; May 18, 1854 Westmoreland County, Pennsylvania, U.S.
- Died: May 14, 1912 (aged 57) Seattle, Washington, U.S.
- Party: Republican

Washington Clark Rutter (May 18, 1854 – May 14, 1912) was an American politician in the state of Washington. He served in the Washington State Senate from 1891 to 1895.
