= Lorenzo Malfatti =

American opera singer

Lorenzo Malfatti (September 11, 1923, Pittsburgh, Pennsylvania – November 23, 2007, Pittsburgh, Pennsylvania) was a baritone opera singer and professor of music at Chatham College, where he taught voice, diction, and opera, and conducted the Chatham College Choir.

Later in his career he was a voice coach for the Lyric Opera of Chicago. He later joined the faculty of the University of Cincinnati's College-Conservatory of Music. He was an alumnus of the Juilliard School, the Cherubini Conservatory in Florence, Italy, and the St. Cecilia Conservatory and Academy in Rome, Italy. He held an honorary doctorate from Chatham College.

He dubbed the voices of Fernando Lamas in the 1952 film The Merry Widow, Howard Keel in Annie Get Your Gun (1950) and Danny Kaye in Hans Christian Andersen (1952).
