= Elizabeth Moorhead =

American author (1865–1955)

Elizabeth Moorhead Vermorcken (c. 1865 – June 2, 1955) was an American writer from Pittsburgh. She is best known for her novels set in Pittsburgh. She generally wrote under her maiden name, Elizabeth Moorhead. During her lifetime, she was considered Pittsburgh's foremost female author.

== Early life ==
Moorhead was born in Pittsburgh. Her exact birthdate is not known, but was just after the end of the American Civil War in 1865. Moorhead's father, William J. Moorhead, owned a steel mill, and her grandfather, James Kennedy Moorhead, was a congressman. Moorhead was educated at a private boarding school in Philadelphia. After graduation, she learned to speak French after a winter in Paris. She married the Belgian artist Frederick Vermorcken in 1891, but the marriage ended sometime between 1894 and 1895, at which point Moorhead returned to America. Between her marriage in 1891 and her return to Pittsburgh in 1910, she lived in Philadelphia, New York, San Francisco, and Paris.

From 1910 to 1928, she taught English at Carnegie Technical Schools (now known as Carnegie Mellon University). Not much is known about her personal life during these years. She is known to have published a number of articles and short stories in various magazines, including Harper's, Scribner's, and Century. She was a well-regarded speaker on literary subjects. She retired from teaching in 1928.

== Writing career ==
After her retirement, Moorhead transitioned from short stories to novels. In 1929, she published her first novel, Clouded Hills. A reviewer for The New York Times wrote that "Miss Moorhouse has done well for her first novel. Perhaps with time she will strengthen her hand." Her second novel, Answer Before Dark, was published in 1930. A review in The Washington Post described her writing in Answer Before Dark and in Clouded Hills, as having, "a delicacy of diction which is very charming." Her third novel, The Forbidden Tree, was published in 1933. All three stories are set in Pittsburgh and although they were not autobiographical, often drew inspiration from Moorhead's life.

Moorhead moved to Florence, Italy, in 1933, after the onset of the Great Depression. During her time in Italy, she began to write a history of Pittsburgh based on her family records. She fled back to Pittsburgh in November 1940 after Italy joined World War II, leaving the majority of her possessions behind. In Pittsburgh, she continued work on the book, eventually published in 1942 by the University of Philadelphia Press as Whirling Spindle.

Her final book, These Too Were Here: Louise Homer and Willa Cather, was published in 1950, also by the University of Philadelphia Press. It was a short reminisce about the early life of Pittsburgh novelist Willa Cather. Although it became the basis of many biographies of Cather, later reviewers have described it as "highly romanticized" and have questioned its accuracy.

Moorhead died in Pittsburgh on June 2, 1955.

== Bibliography ==
- Clouded Hills (1929, Bobbs Merrill)
- Answer Before Dark (1930, Bobbs Merrill)
- The Forbidden Tree (1933, Bobbs Merrill)
- Whirling Spindle (1942, University of Philadelphia Press)
- These Too Were Here: Louise Homer and Willa Cather (1950, University of Philadelphia Press)
