= Burton Morris =

American painter

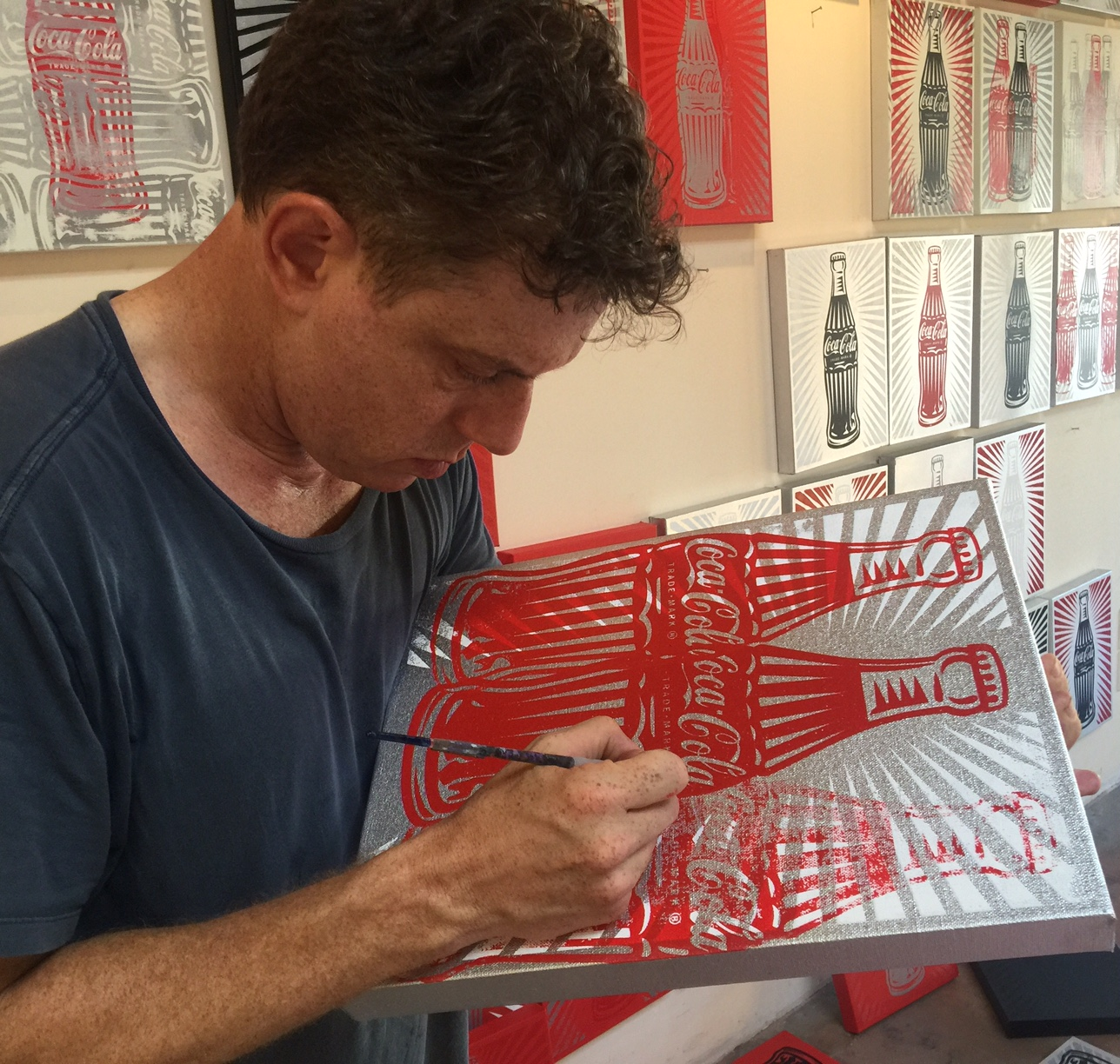
Artist Burton Morris

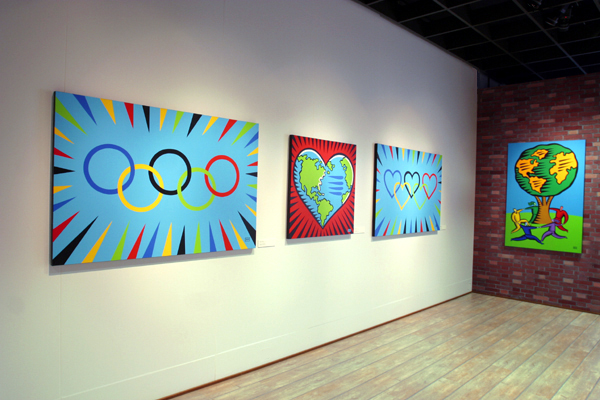
International Olympic Museum

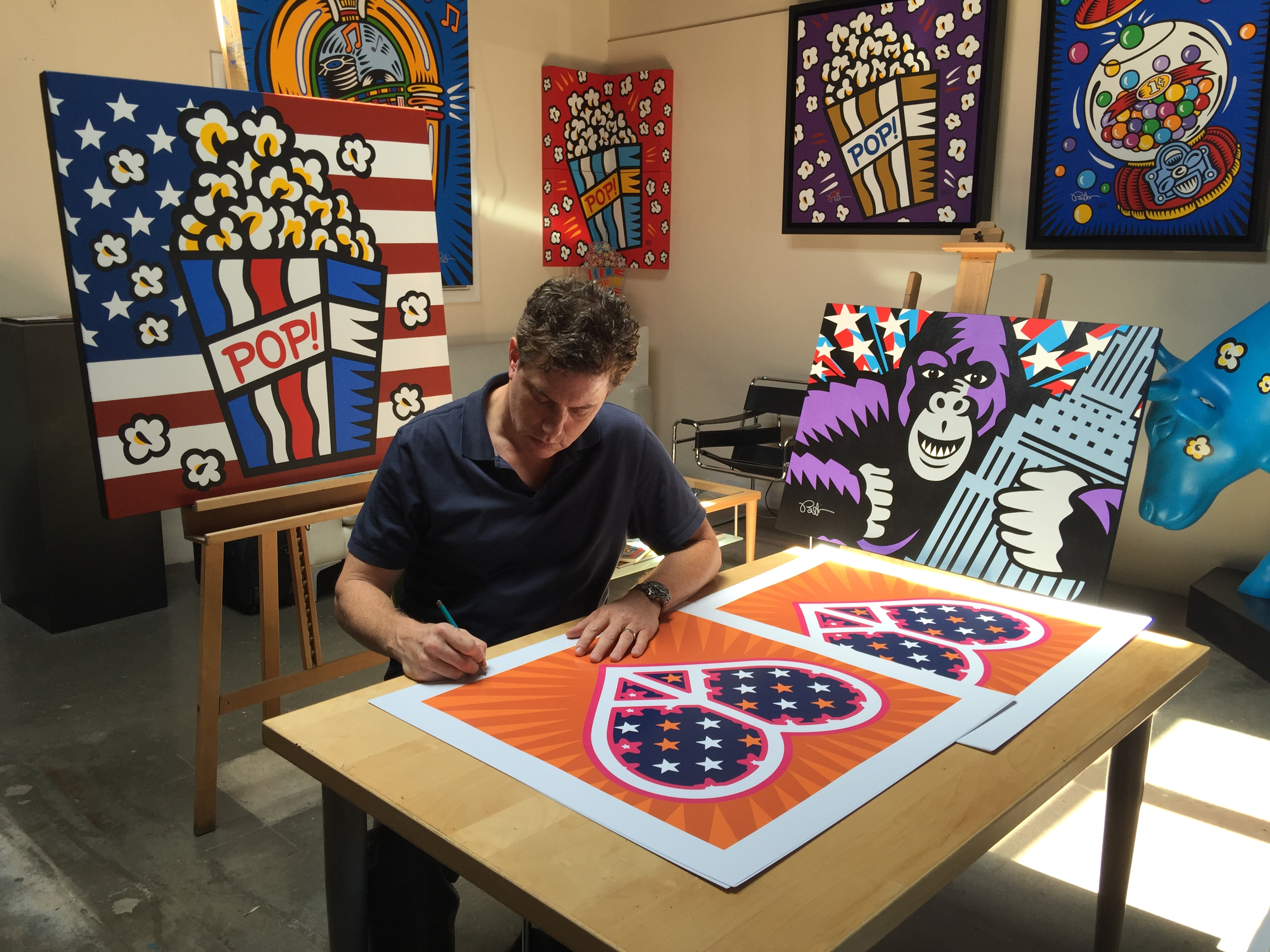
Artist Burton Morris - LA Art Studio

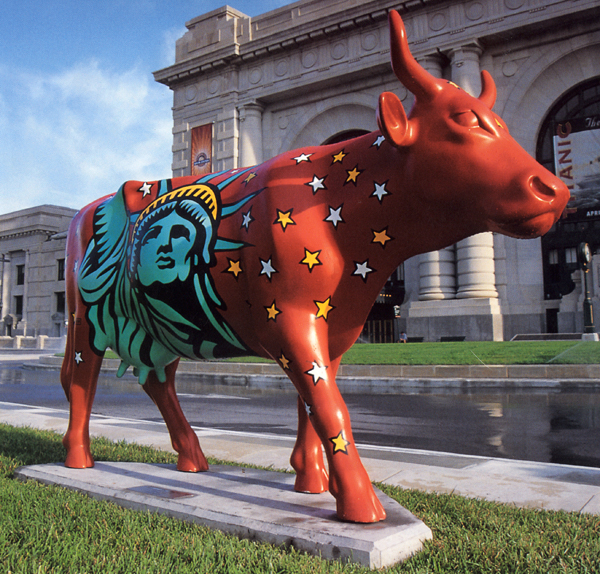
Cow Parade 2000 NYC

Burton Morris (born 1964) is an American pop artist. Best known for his bold, graphic pop art paintings and depictions of various modern icons, his subject matter includes everyday objects that portray today's popular culture. His distinctive style is characterized by radiant outlines and vivid colours in all of his art.

== Early life and education ==
Burton Morris was born in Pittsburgh, Pennsylvania in 1964. He earned his bachelor of fine arts degree from Carnegie Mellon University in 1986.

== Career ==
After graduation, Burton started a career as an Art Director in Advertising. He established the Burton Morris Studios in 1990.

In 1992, Absolut Vodka selected his artwork to represent Pennsylvania for its prestigious Absolut Statehood campaign. In 1994, his paintings began to hang on the hit NBC television sitcom Friends, which continued to showcase his artwork for over ten seasons to millions of viewers worldwide.

In 2004 he was selected to create the signature image for the 76th Academy Awards. The artwork enlivened the facade of the Kodak Theatre in Hollywood, CA and was seen by over one billion people worldwide.

Over the years, Morris has created signature artwork for the United States Olympic Team, the 2006 MLB All-Star Game, the 38th Montreux Jazz Festival, the 2010 FIFA World Cup, and the 2016 U.S. Open ( golf ) to name a few.

Original artworks have been commissioned for corporations and institutions such as H.J.Heinz Corporation, Chanel, Perrier, Rolex, Kellogg's, Ford, Coca-Cola and AT&T. In addition, Burton's artwork has helped to raise millions of dollars for charities internationally.

Morris’ artwork is featured in the collections of The Albright Knox Museum, The Academy of Motion Picture Arts and Sciences, The Jimmy Carter Centre, The World Of Coca-Cola Museum, The Obama Presidential Centre, The United Nations, The Elysée Museum, The International Olympic Museum, and The Hickory Museum Of Art.
