= Robin Kanarek =

American physiological psychologist

- Born: April 8, 1946 (age 80); Pittsburgh, Pennsylvania, U.S.
- Education: Antioch College; Rutgers University
- Children: 2
- Scientific career
- Fields: Physiological psychology
- Workplaces: Tufts University

Robin Beth Kanarek (born April 8, 1946) is an American physiological psychologist and academic administrator specializing on nutrition and behavior. She is a retired professor of psychology from Tufts University School of Arts and Sciences, where she held the endowed John Wade Professorship from 2000 to 2019. Kanarek also served in several administrative leadership roles at Tufts, including as dean of the Graduate School of Arts and Sciences from 2002 to 2006 and as interim dean of the Friedman School of Nutrition Science and Policy from 2011 to 2014.

== Early life and education ==
Kanarek was born on April 8, 1946, in Pittsburgh, Pennsylvania. She studied at Antioch College where she served as a National Science Foundation research fellow at the American Museum of Natural History. She received a B.A. in biology in 1968.

Kanarek pursued her graduate studies at Rutgers University. She earned a M.S. in psychology in 1971. Her master's thesis was titled "Effort as a Determinant of Choice." She completed her Ph.D. in Psychology in 1974. Her dissertation, "The Energetics of Meal Patterns," focused on the behavioral neuroscience of nutrition and was published in the journal Physiology & Behavior in 1976.

During graduate school, Kanarek held instructor positions at Rutgers University and Jersey City State College. She was a postdoctoral fellow at Harvard University's department of nutrition and a research fellow in the endocrinology division at the David Geffen School of Medicine at UCLA. She held an early research fellowship at Tufts University.

== Career ==
After her fellowship at UCLA, Kanarek returned to Tufts University School of Arts and Sciences for the remainder of her career. She began as a research assistant professor and was promoted to associate professor from 1983 to 1989 and full professor of psychology from 1989 to 2000. Kanarek served as editor-in-chief of the journal Nutrition and Behavior from 1980 to 1987 and as associate editor of Nutritional Neuroscience. She held an appointment as an adjunct professor of nutrition beginning in 1989 and was a professor at the Friedman School of Nutrition Science and Policy.

In 2000, Kanarek was named the John Wade Professor, an endowed position she held until 2019. Within the psychology department, she served as deputy chair and subsequently as chair for two terms. Kanarek was dean of the Graduate School of Arts and Sciences from 2002 to 2006. She served a three-year term as the interim dean of the Gerald J. and Dorothy R. Friedman School of Nutrition Science and Policy from 2011 to 2014.

=== Research ===
Kanarek's research focused on physiological psychology, the regulation of food intake, and the behavioral neuroscience of nutrition. Her work has investigated the effects of nutritional variables on the development of obesity and diabetes, factors influencing diet selection in humans and animals, and the role of nutrients and physical activity on the consequences of psychoactive drugs. Her research examined the effects of obesity and diabetes on cognitive behavior, the relationship between nutrition and cognition in children and adults, and the role of exercise

Her books include Nutrition and Behavior: New Perspectives (1991), Nutritional Neuroscience (2005), Nutrition and Behavior, A Multidisciplinary Approach (1st ed. 2006, 2nd ed. 2011), and Diet, Brain, Behavior: Practical Implications (2011). She served as a principal investigator on NIH grants beginning in 1978.

== Personal life ==
Kanarek married in 1986 and has two sons. She has completed several triathlons. She is a member of a women's triathlon team and has served as an outreach coordinator for AimTriTeam, an organization dedicated to helping women participate in the sport.
