= Gunner Badge =

Military badge of the United States Army Air Forces

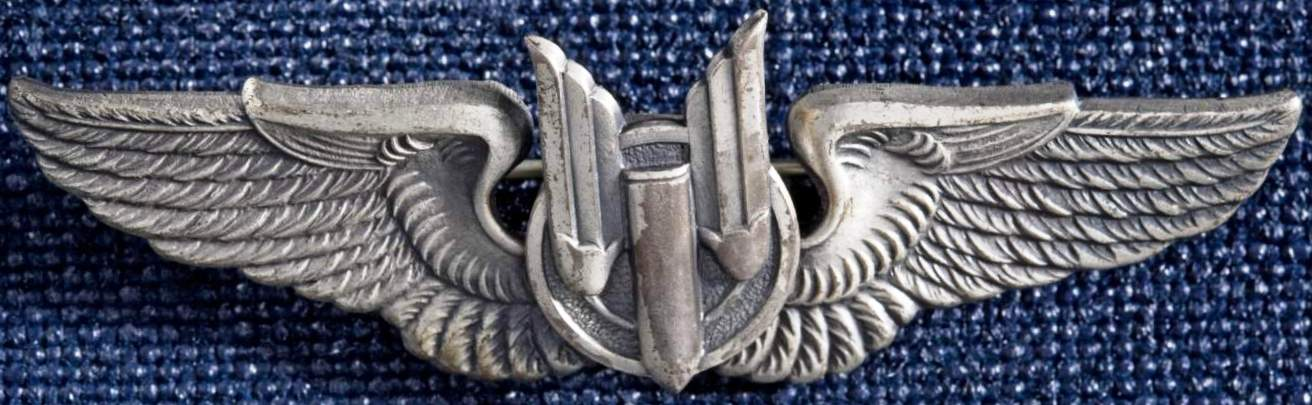
U.S. Army Air Force's Aerial Gunner Badge

The Aerial Gunner Badge was a military aeronautical badge of the United States Army Air Forces and was issued during the Second World War. The badge was first created and authorized on April 29, 1943 to recognize both the training and hazardous duty of aerial gunners, who manned defensive machineguns on board such aircraft as the Boeing B-17 Flying Fortress, Consolidated B-24 Liberator, North American B-25 Mitchell, Martin B-26 Marauder and Boeing B-29 Superfortress bombers. The Aerial Gunner Badge appeared as a standard observer badge, upon which was centered a winged bullet. It was primarily awarded to USAAF enlisted aircrewmen, but a small number of commissioned officers also qualified and were awarded this insignia, to include film actor Clark Gable.

The Aerial Gunner Badge was issued until 1953, in the newly created United States Air Force (1947). The Aerial Gunner Badge was declared obsolete and phased out in favor of the Aircrew Badge.

Those having received the Aerial Gunner Badge were permitted to wear the original badge until 1955, at which time the badge was no longer authorized for display on an Air Force uniform.

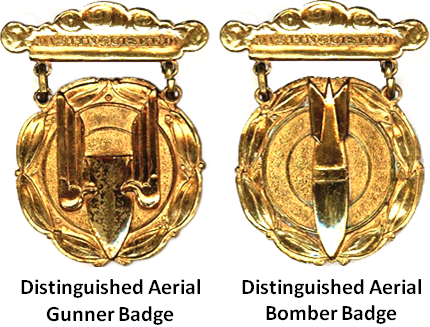
distinguished aerial Gunner badge

Prior to the establishment of the Aerial Gunner Badge, these airman could compete in an aerial gunnery competition to earn the Distinguished Aerial Gunner Badge. This lasted from 1926–1932. Beyond this, there was no badge displayed on the uniform to denote one as an aerial gunner.

== See also ==
- Obsolete badges of the United States military
- Military badges of the United States
