= Clark Gable =

American actor (1901–1960)

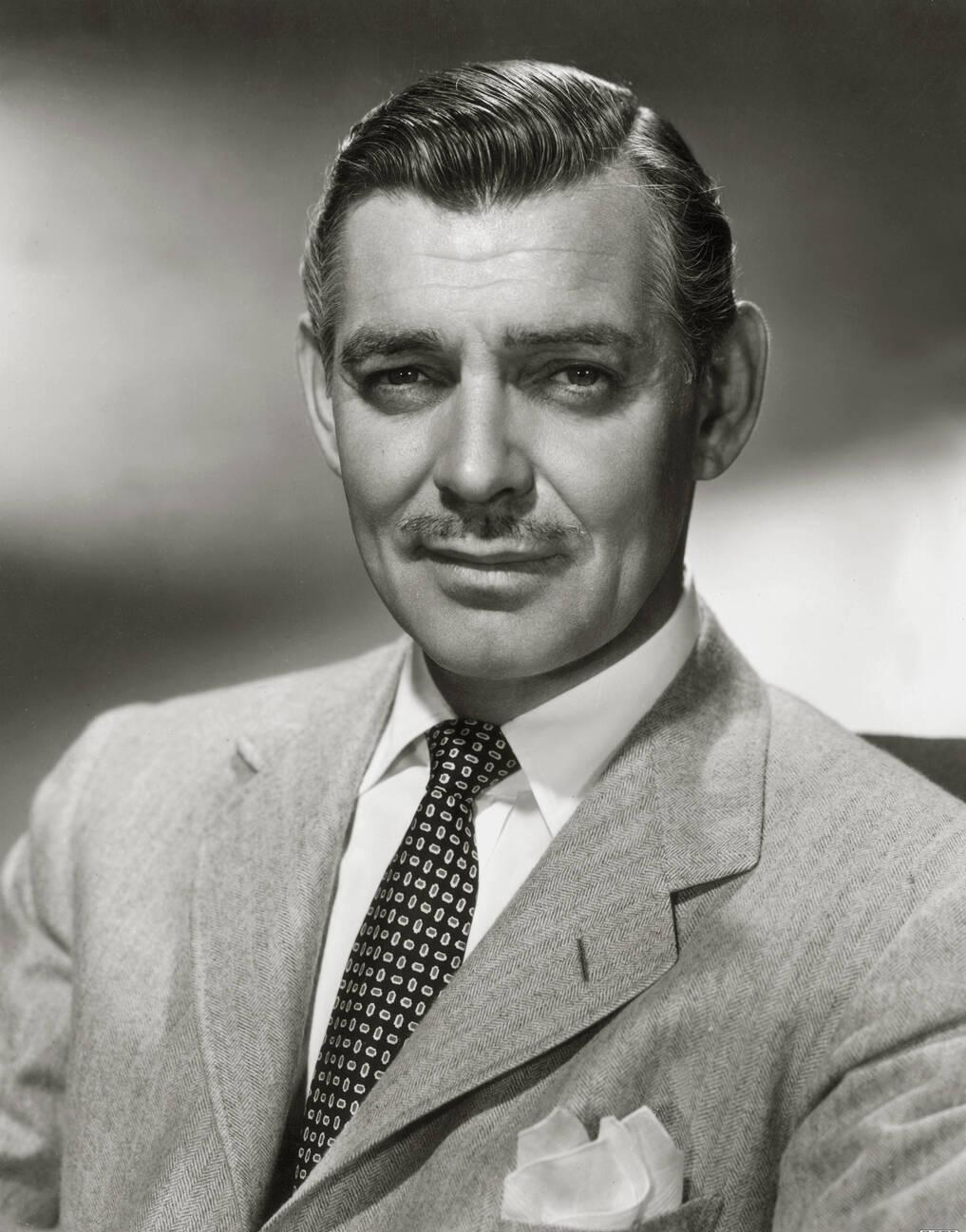
- Clark Gable publicity portrait c. 1945
- Born: William Clark Gable; February 1, 1901; Cadiz, Ohio, U.S.
- Died: November 16, 1960 (aged 59); Los Angeles, California, U.S.
- Burial place: Forest Lawn Memorial Park
- Other name: The King of Hollywood
- Occupation: Actor
- Years active: 1924–1960
- Political party: Republican
- Spouses: Josephine Dillon (m. 1924; div. 1930) Maria Langham (m. 1931; div. 1939) Carole Lombard (m. 1939; died 1942) Sylvia Ashley (m. 1949; div. 1952) Kay Williams (m. 1955)
- Children: 2, including Judy Lewis
- Relatives: Clark James Gable (grandson)
- Awards: Full list
- Military career
- Allegiance: United States
- Branch: United States Army; Army Air Forces; United States Air Force
- Service years: 1942–1947
- Rank: Major
- Units: 351st Bomb Group; 18th AAF Base Unit
- Conflicts: World War II; European Theater
- Awards: Distinguished Flying Cross; Air Medal; American Campaign Medal; European–African–Middle Eastern Campaign Medal; World War II Victory Medal

William Clark Gable (February 1, 1901 – November 16, 1960) was an American actor often referred to as the "King of Hollywood". He appeared in more than 60 motion pictures across a variety of genres during a 37-year career, three decades of which he spent as a leading man. In 1999, the American Film Institute ranked Gable as the seventh-greatest male screen legend of classical Hollywood cinema.

Gable won the Academy Award for Best Actor for his role in Frank Capra's It Happened One Night (1934) and earned nominations in the same category for portraying Fletcher Christian in Frank Lloyd's Mutiny on the Bounty (1935) and Rhett Butler in Victor Fleming's Gone with the Wind (1939). For his comedic performances in George Seaton's Teacher's Pet (1958) and Walter Lang's But Not for Me (1959), Gable received nominations for the Golden Globe Award for Best Actor in a Motion Picture – Musical or Comedy. His other notable films include William A. Wellman's Call of the Wild (1935), George Sidney's Key to the City (1950), and John Ford's Mogambo (1953). His final onscreen role was as an aging cowboy in John Huston's The Misfits (1961).

Gable was one of the most consistently bankable stars in the history of Hollywood, appearing 16 times on Quigley Publishing's annual Top Ten Money Making Stars Poll. He appeared opposite many of the most popular actresses of their time. He died of a heart attack in 1960 at age 59.

== Early life ==
=== 1901–1919: Family and upbringing ===
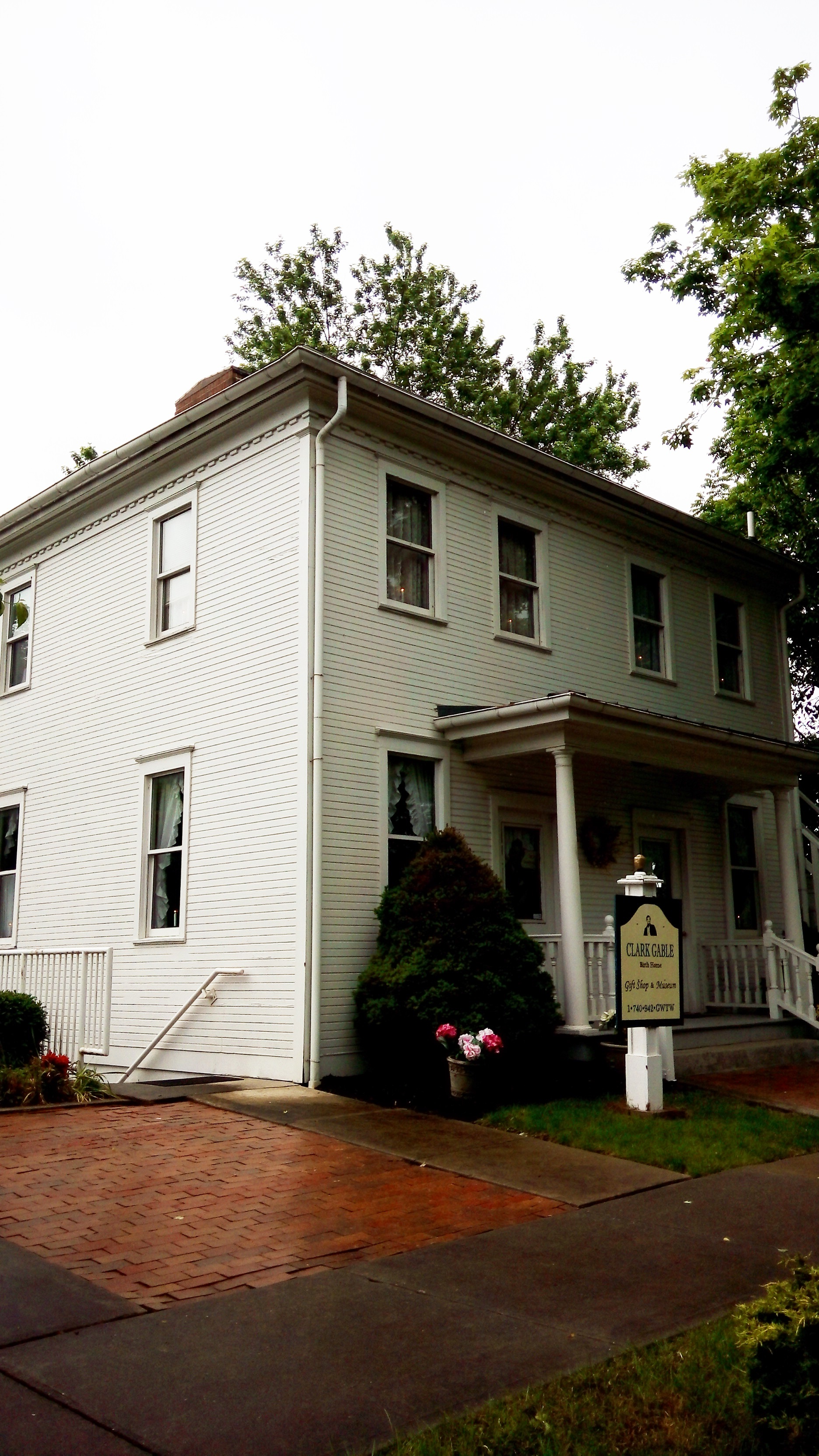
Gable's 1901 birthplace in Cadiz, Ohio

William Clark Gable was born on February 1, 1901, in Cadiz, Ohio, to William Henry "Will" Gable (1870–1948), an oil-well driller, and his wife Adeline (née Hershelman). His father was a Protestant and his mother a Catholic. Gable was named William after his father, but he was almost always called Clark, and referred to as "the kid" by his father. Gable was six months old when he was baptized at a Roman Catholic church in Dennison, Ohio. When he was ten months old, his mother died. His father refused to raise him in the Catholic faith, which provoked criticism from the Hershelman family. Gable and his father were active in the Methodist church where his father was a Sunday School teacher. The dispute was resolved when his father agreed to allow him to spend time with his maternal uncle Charles Hershelman and his wife on their farm in Vernon Township, Pennsylvania. In April 1903, Gable's father married Jennie Dunlap (1874–1920).

Gable's stepmother raised the tall, shy child with a loud voice to be well-dressed and well-groomed. She played the piano and gave him lessons at home. He later took up brass musical instruments, becoming the youngest member of the Hopedale Men's town band at age 13. Gable was mechanically inclined and loved to repair cars with his father, who insisted that he engage in masculine activities such as hunting and hard physical work. Gable also loved literature; he would recite Shakespeare among trusted company, particularly the sonnets.

His father had financial difficulties in 1917 and decided to try his hand at farming, and moved the family to Palmyra Township, near Akron, Ohio. He insisted that Gable work the farm, but the latter soon left to work in Akron for the Firestone Tire and Rubber Company.

=== 1920–1923: Early career ===
Gable was inspired to become an actor after seeing the play The Bird of Paradise at age 17, but he was unable to make a start in acting until he turned 21 and received his $300 inheritance (equivalent to $5,770 in 2025) from a Hershelman trust. After his stepmother died in 1920, his father moved to Tulsa, Oklahoma, going back into the oil business. He worked with his father for some time wildcatting and sludge removing in the oil fields of Oklahoma before traveling to the Pacific Northwest.

Gable toured in second-class stock companies, finding work with traveling tent shows, lumber mills, and other odd jobs. He made his way across the Midwest to Portland, Oregon, where he worked as a necktie salesman in the Meier & Frank department store. Also working there was local stage actor Earle Larimore (the nephew of Laura Hope Crews, who portrayed Aunt Pittypat alongside Gable in Gone with the Wind), who encouraged Gable to return to acting. Though Larimore did not invite him to join his theater group The Red Lantern Players, he did introduce Gable to one of its members, Franz Dorfler, and they started dating. After the couple's audition for The Astoria Players, Gable's lack of training was evident, but the theater group accepted him after cajoling from Larimore. Gable and Dorfler moved to Astoria, Oregon, touring with the group until its bankruptcy, and then moved back to Portland where Gable obtained a day job with Pacific Telephone and started receiving dramatic lessons in the evening.

Gable's acting coach, Josephine Dillon, was a theater manager in Portland. She paid to have his teeth fixed and his hair styled. She guided him in building up his chronically undernourished body, and taught him better body control and posture. He slowly managed to lower his naturally high-pitched voice, his speech habits improved, and his facial expressions became more natural and convincing. After a long period of her training, Dillon considered Gable ready to attempt a film career.

== Career ==
=== 1924–1930: Stage and silent films ===
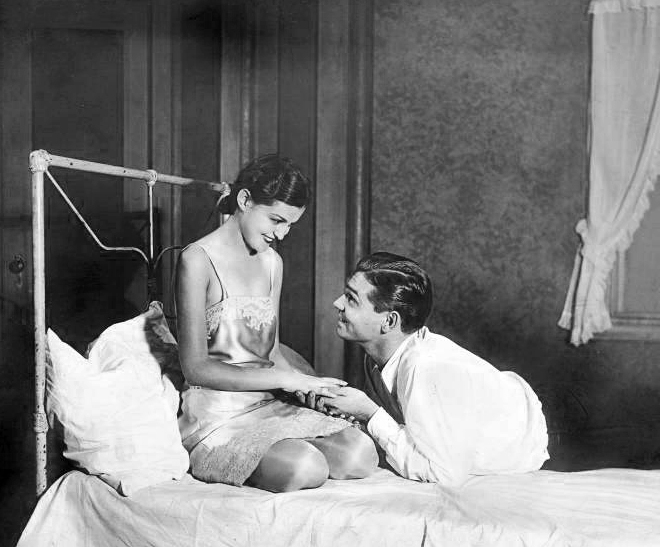
In 1928's Machinal with Zita Johann, Gable was lauded as "young, vigorous, and brutally masculine" by one critic.

Gable and Dillon traveled to Hollywood in 1924. Dillon became his manager and also his wife; she was 17 years his senior. He changed his stage name from W. C. Gable to Clark Gable and appeared as an extra in such silent films as Erich von Stroheim's The Merry Widow (1925), The Plastic Age (1925) starring Clara Bow, and Forbidden Paradise (1924) starring Pola Negri. He appeared in a series of two-reel comedies called The Pacemakers and in Fox's The Johnstown Flood (1926). He also appeared as a bit player in a series of shorts. However, he was not offered any major film roles, so he returned to the stage in What Price Glory? (1925).

He became lifelong friends with Lionel Barrymore, who initially scolded Gable for what he deemed amateurish acting but nevertheless urged him to pursue a stage career. During the 1927–28 theater season, he acted with the Laskin Brothers Stock Company in Houston, Texas; while there, he played many roles, gained considerable experience, and became a local matinee idol. He then moved to New York City, where Dillon sought work for him on Broadway. He received good reviews in Machinal (1928), with one critic describing him as "young, vigorous, and brutally masculine".

Gable and Dillon separated, filing for divorce in March 1929, while he began working on the play Hawk Island in New York, which ran for 24 performances. In April 1930, Gable's divorce became final, and a few days later he married Texas socialite Maria Franklin Prentiss Lucas Langham, nicknamed "Ria". After moving to California, they were married again in 1931, possibly due to differences in state legal requirements.

=== 1930–1935: Early success ===
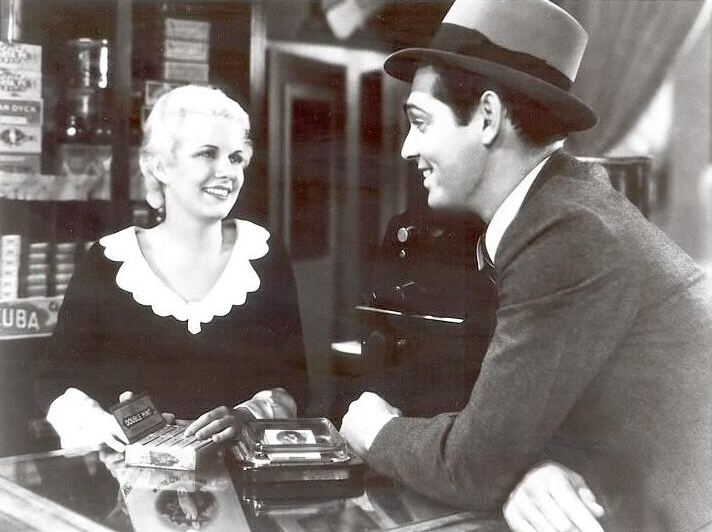
Jean Harlow and Gable in The Secret Six (1931)

In 1930, after his impressive appearance as the seething and desperate character Killer Mears in the Los Angeles stage production of The Last Mile, Gable was offered a contract with Pathé Pictures. His only film for them and first role in a sound picture was as the unshaven villain in their low-budget William Boyd western, The Painted Desert (1931). The studio experienced financial problems after the film's delayed release, so Gable left for work at Warner Bros.

The same year in Night Nurse, Gable played a villainous chauffeur who knocked Barbara Stanwyck's character unconscious for trying to save two children whom he was methodically starving to death. The supporting role was originally slated for James Cagney until the release of The Public Enemy catapulted him to star status. "His ears are too big and he looks like an ape", said Warner Bros. executive Darryl F. Zanuck about Gable, after testing him for the second male lead in the studio's gangster drama Little Caesar (1931). After his failed screen test for Zanuck, Gable was signed in 1930 by MGM's Irving Thalberg for $650 per week (equivalent to approximately $13,761 in 2025). He hired the well-connected Minna Wallis, a sister of producer Hal Wallis, as his agent, whose clients included actresses Claudette Colbert, Myrna Loy and Norma Shearer.

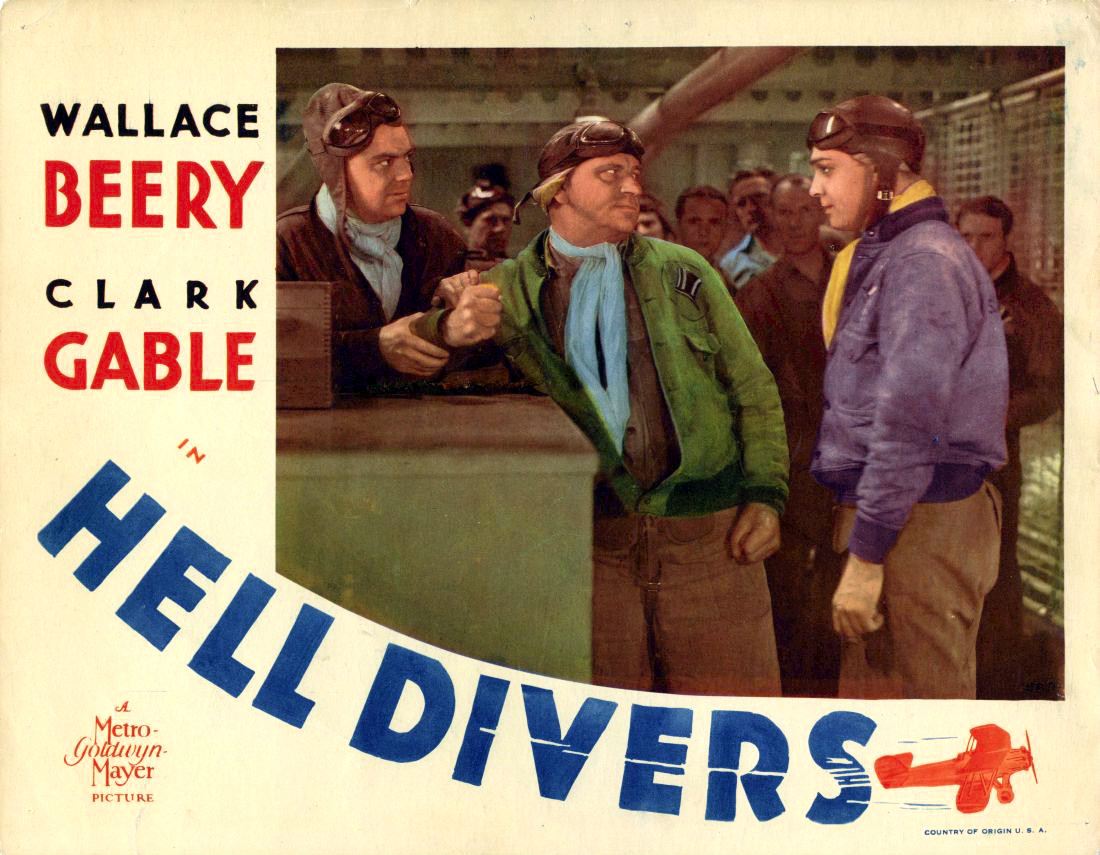
Gable's 1932 supporting role in Hell Divers was almost as important as Wallace Beery's, and he received second billing above the title for the aviation film's lobby card.

Gable's arrival in Hollywood occurred when MGM was looking to expand its stable of male stars, and he fit the bill. He made two pictures in 1931 with Wallace Beery. In the first, he had a seventh-billed support role in The Secret Six, although his role was much larger than the billing would indicate. Then he achieved second billing in a part almost as large as the film's star Beery in the naval aviation film Hell Divers. MGM's publicity manager Howard Strickling started developing Gable's studio image with Screenland magazine playing up his "lumberjack-in-evening-clothes" persona.

To increasing popularity, MGM frequently paired him with well-established female stars. Joan Crawford asked for him to appear with her in Dance, Fools, Dance (1931). The electricity of the pair was recognized by studio executive Louis B. Mayer, who would not only put them in seven more films but also began reshooting Complete Surrender, replacing John Mack Brown as Crawford's leading man and retitling the film Laughing Sinners (1931). His fame and public visibility after A Free Soul (1931), in which he played a gangster who shoved the character played by Norma Shearer, ensured that Gable never played a supporting role again. He received extensive fan mail as a result of his performance; the studio took notice. The Hollywood Reporter wrote "A star in the making has been made, one that, to our reckoning, will outdraw every other star ... Never have we seen audiences work themselves into such enthusiasm as when Clark Gable walks on the screen."

Gable co-starred in Susan Lenox (Her Fall and Rise) (1931) with Greta Garbo, and in Possessed (1931), a film about an illicit romantic affair, with Joan Crawford (who was then married to Douglas Fairbanks Jr.). Adela Rogers St. Johns later dubbed Gable and Crawford's real-life relationship as "the affair that nearly burned Hollywood down". Louis B. Mayer threatened to terminate both their contracts, and for a while, they kept apart when Gable shifted his attentions to Marion Davies as he costarred with her in Polly of the Circus (1932). Gable was considered for the role of Tarzan in Tarzan the Ape Man, but lost out to Johnny Weissmuller's more imposing physique and superior swimming prowess. Gable then starred as the romantic lead in Strange Interlude (1932), again teaming with Shearer, the second of three films they would make together for MGM.

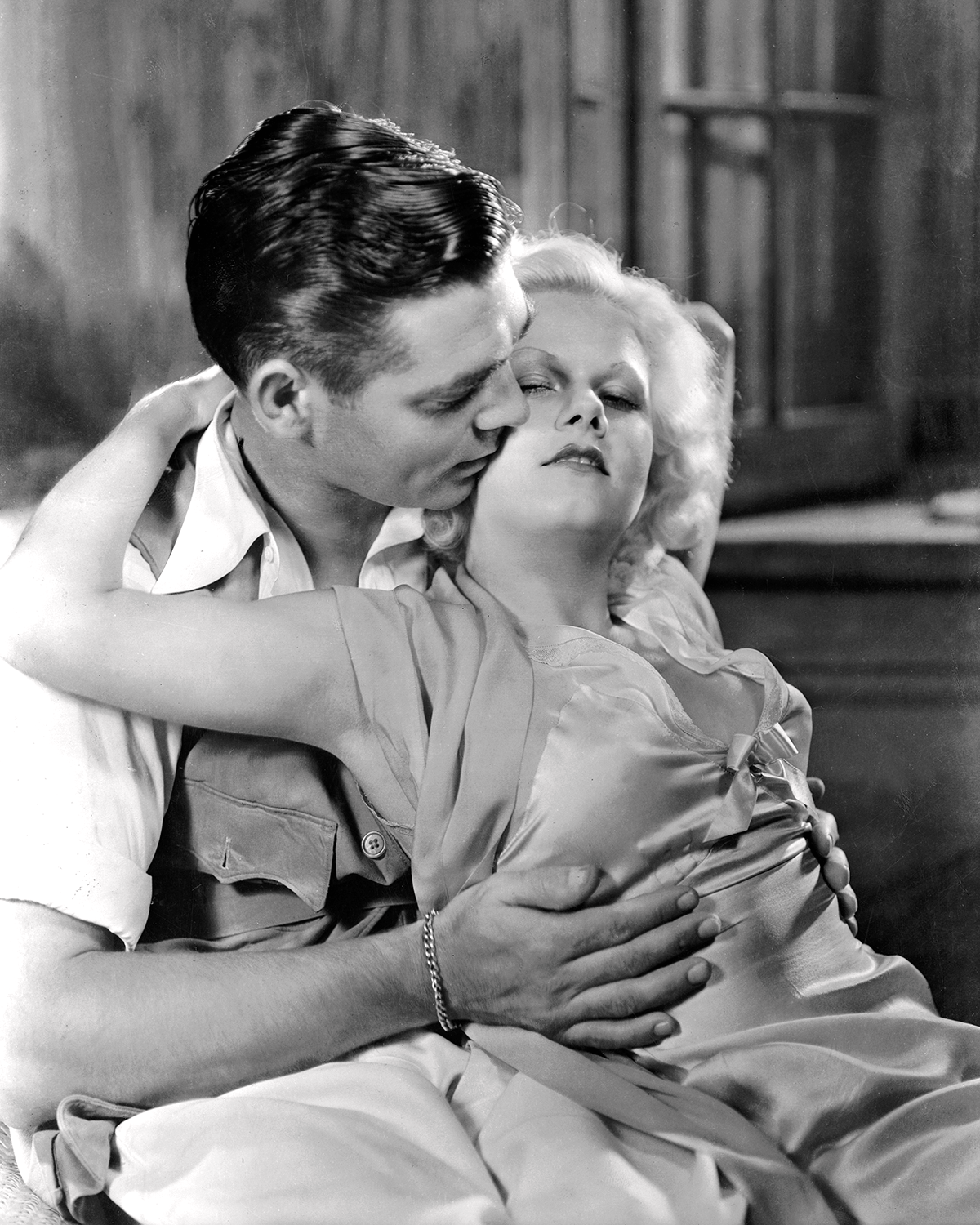
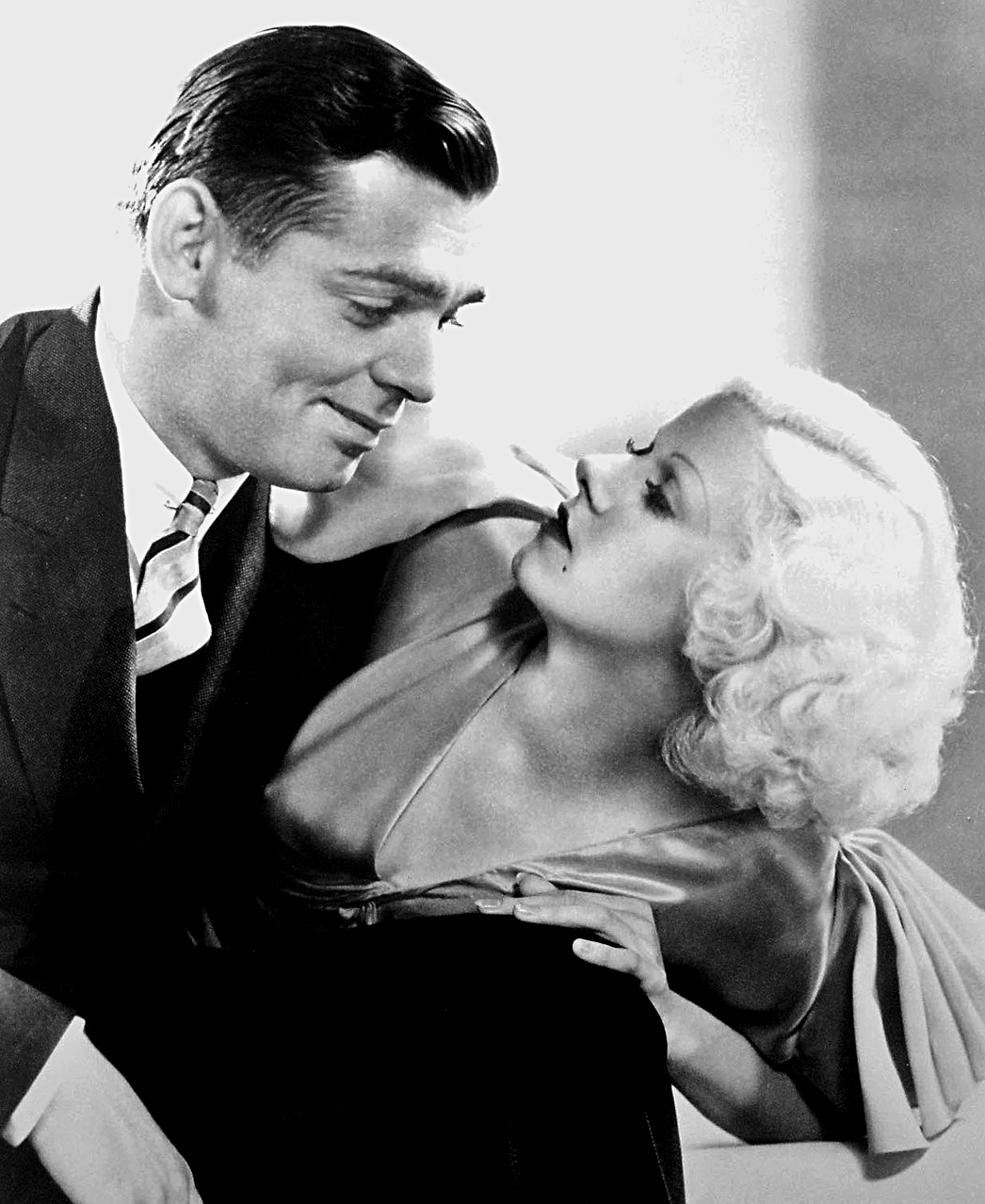
Gable with Jean Harlow in Red Dust (left) and Hold Your Man (right)

Next, Gable starred with Jean Harlow in the romantic comedy-drama Red Dust (1932) set on a rubber plantation in Indochina. Gable portrayed a plantation manager involved with Harlow's wisecracking prostitute; however, upon her arrival, Gable's character started to pursue Mary Astor's prim, classy newlywed. While some critics thought Harlow stole the show, many agreed that Gable was a natural screen partner.

Gable's "unshaven love-making" with braless Jean Harlow in Red Dust made him MGM's most important romantic leading man. With Gable established as a star, MGM positioned him in the same manner as Harlow for Myrna Loy, a previously lesser billed actor in Night Flight, moving Loy to a costar role in Men in White, a movie filmed in 1933, though delayed in release due to pre-Code Legion of Decency cuts until 1934. The relationship of a doctor (Gable) and nurse (Elizabeth Allan) implied intimacy with a resulting complication of pregnancy, a sensitive issue and new image for Gable.

Gable and Harlow were then teamed in Hold Your Man (1933), China Seas (1935), in which the pair were billed above Wallace Beery, and Wife vs. Secretary (1936) with Myrna Loy costarring and supported by newcomer James Stewart. A popular combination on-screen and off, Gable and Harlow made six films together in five years. Their final film together was Saratoga (1937), a bigger hit than their previous collaborations. Harlow died during its production. The film was ninety percent completed, and the remaining scenes were filmed with long shots or the use of doubles like Mary Dees; Gable said he felt as if he were "in the arms of a ghost".

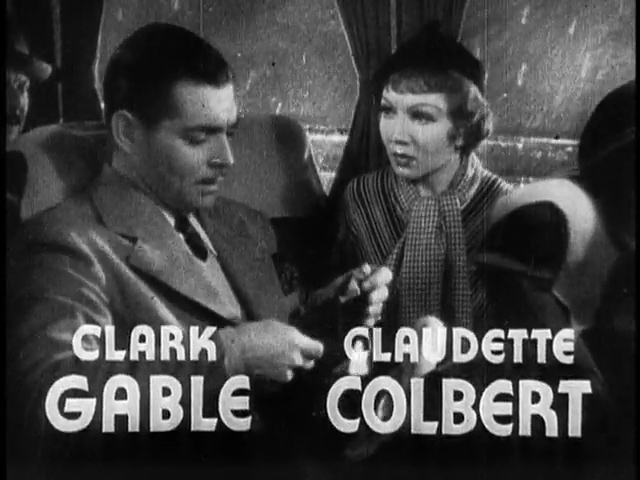
Gable and Claudette Colbert in It Happened One Night (1934)

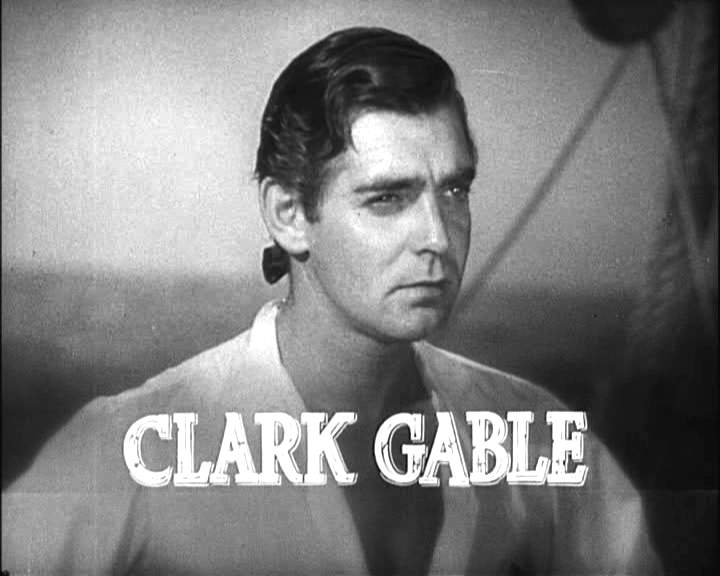
Gable in Mutiny on the Bounty (1935)

When MGM head Louis B. Mayer decided that Gable was getting difficult and ungrateful, he loaned Gable out to the lower-rank Columbia studio, for It Happened One Night (1934), to teach Gable a lesson, but Columbia wanted him and had paid handsomely for it. The result was that Gable won the Academy Award for Best Actor in the film. "Critics praised the fast-paced farce that would enter in a whole new romantic genre: the screwball comedy." Gable's career was revitalized by his whimsical, good-natured performance and to the director Frank Capra, Gable's character in the film closely resembled his real personality. Gable returned to MGM a bigger star than ever.

Gable's first movie role back at MGM was to portray reluctant leader of mutineers Fletcher Christian, an "Englishman in knickers and a three-cornered hat", one he had to be talked into by friend and producer Irving Thalberg, and of which Gable said "I stink in it" after filming. Mutiny on the Bounty (1935) was a critical and commercial success, receiving eight Academy Award nominations. There were three Best Actor nominations for stars Gable, Charles Laughton and Franchot Tone, and the film won Best Picture, the second of three films in which Gable played a leading role to do so. The film cost $2 million and grossed $4.5 million, making it one of the top moneymakers that decade. It used life-size replicas of the Bounty and Pandora, and was partly filmed in Catalina and French Polynesia.

=== 1936–1939: Tracy collaborations and Gone with the Wind ===
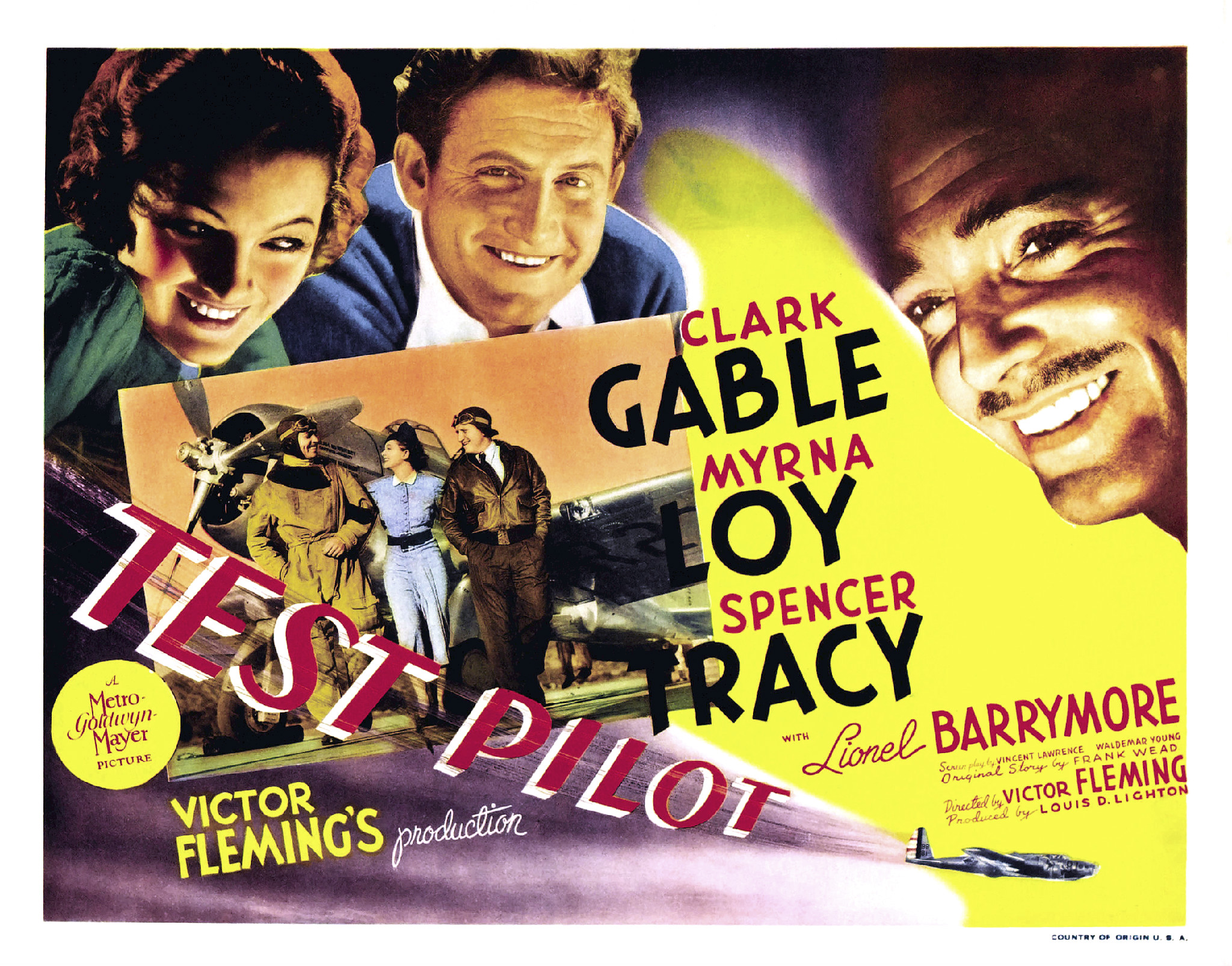
Lobby card for Test Pilot (1938)

Gable made three pictures with Spencer Tracy, which boosted Tracy's career and permanently cemented them in the public mind as a team. San Francisco (1936), with Jeanette MacDonald, featured Tracy for only 17 minutes in an Oscar-nominated portrayal of a Catholic priest who knocks Gable down in a boxing ring. The film was a box office hit and remains the third-highest-grossing film of Gable's career. Their next film together was the Academy Award–nominated box office success Test Pilot (1938), with Myrna Loy, who made seven pictures with Gable. He plays Jim Lane, the test pilot of the title; Tracy is his sidekick mechanic, Gunner Morse.

For their final film, 1940's Boom Town, Tracy would play a larger role, with billing directly under Gable and above Claudette Colbert and Hedy Lamarr. The picture, a lavish epic about two oil wildcatters who become partners then rivals, was a box office success, earning $5 million. Gable and Tracy were off-screen friends; Tracy was one of the few Hollywood industry luminaries who attended Lombard's private funeral. After Boom Town no more Gable-Tracy partnerships were possible; Tracy's success led to a new contract and both stars had conflicting stipulations requiring top billing in MGM movie credits and on promotional posters.

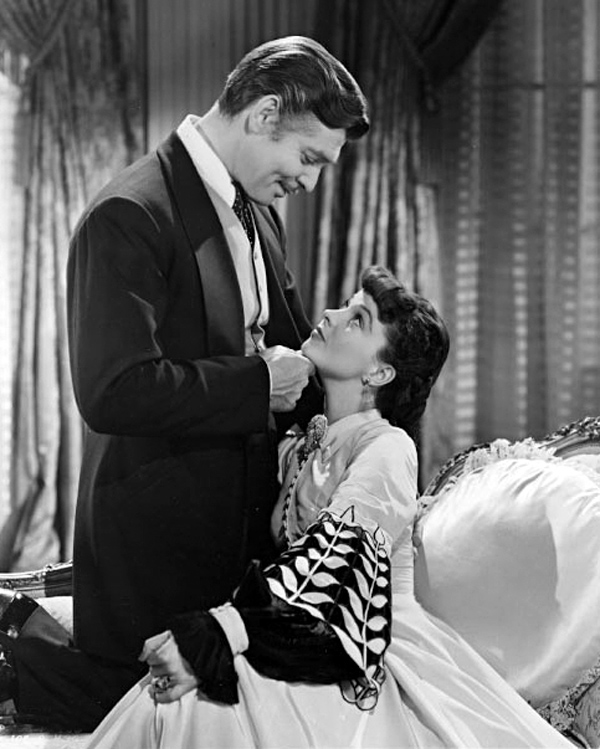
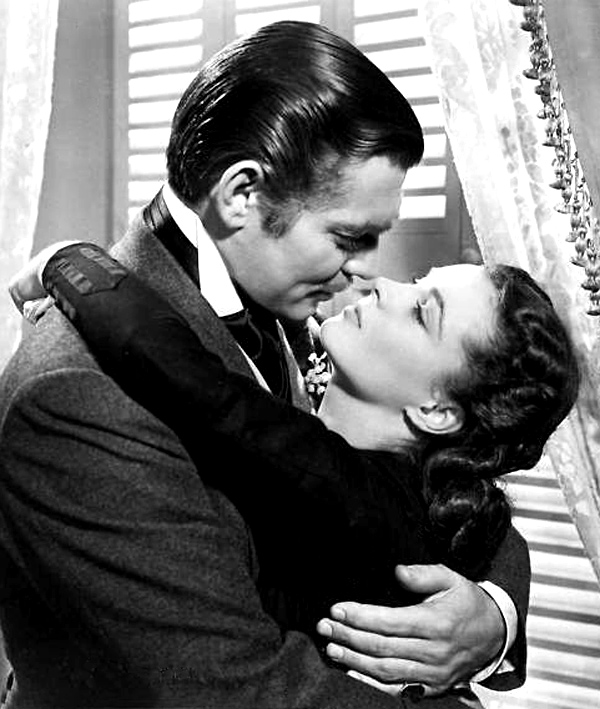
Gable and Vivien Leigh in Gone With the Wind (1939)

Despite his reluctance to play the role, Gable is best known for his Oscar-nominated performance in the Academy Award-winning best picture Gone with the Wind (1939). Carole Lombard may have been the first to suggest that he play Rhett Butler (and she play Scarlett) when she bought him a copy of the best-seller, which he refused to read. His total salary was $117,917 for the film ($2,729,299 in 2025).

Butler's last line in Gone with the Wind, "Frankly, my dear, I don't give a damn", is one of the most famous lines in movie history. Gable was an almost immediate favorite for the role of Rhett with both the public and producer David O. Selznick. Since Selznick had no male stars under long-term contract, he needed to negotiate with another studio to borrow an actor. Gary Cooper was Selznick's first choice. When Cooper turned down the role of Butler, he was quoted as saying, "Gone With the Wind is going to be the biggest flop in Hollywood history. I'm glad it'll be Clark Gable who's falling flat on his nose, not me." By then, Selznick had become determined to hire Gable, and set about finding a way to borrow him from MGM. Gable was wary of potentially disappointing an audience that had decided that no one else could play the part. He later conceded, "I think I know now how a fly must react after being caught in a spider's web."

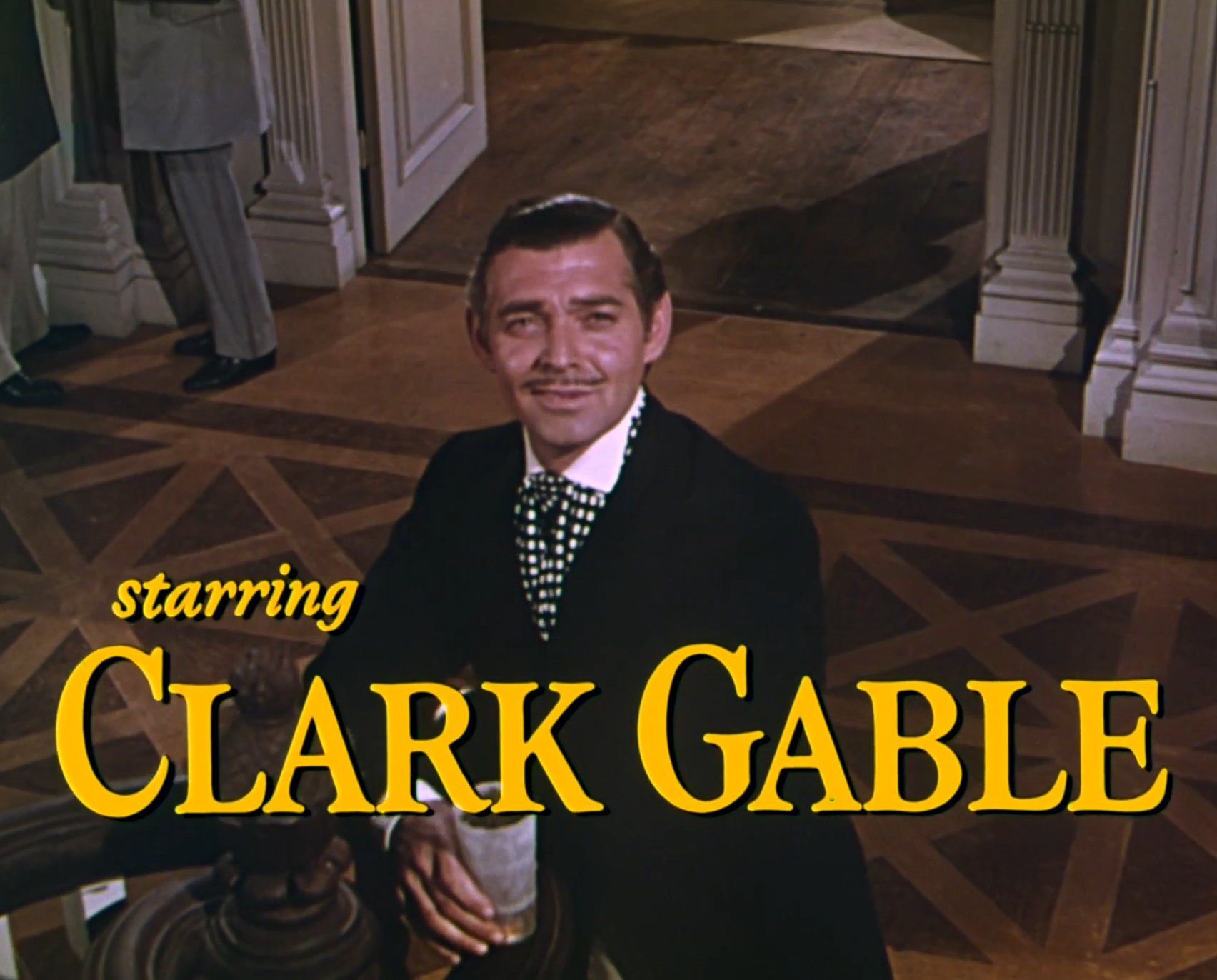
Gable as Rhett Butler

According to Lennie Bluett, an extra in the film, Gable almost walked off the set when he discovered the studio facilities were segregated and signage posted "White" and "Colored". Gable phoned the film's director Victor Fleming and told him, "If you don't get those signs down, you won't get your Rhett Butler." The signs were then taken down. Gable tried to boycott the Gone with the Wind premiere in segregated Atlanta, because African American actors Hattie McDaniel and Butterfly McQueen were not permitted to attend. He reportedly only went after McDaniel pleaded with him to go. They appeared in several more films, remaining life-long friends and he always attended her Hollywood parties.

Gable did not want to shed tears for the scene after Rhett inadvertently causes Scarlett to miscarry their second child. Olivia de Havilland made him cry, later commenting, "Oh, he would not do it. He would not! Victor (Fleming) tried everything with him. He tried to attack him on a professional level. We had done it without him weeping several times and then we had one last try. I said, 'You can do it, I know you can do it, and you will be wonderful ...' Well, by heaven, just before the cameras rolled, you could see the tears come up at his eyes and he played the scene unforgettably well. He put his whole heart into it." The role was one of Gable's most layered performances and partially based on the personality of director and friend Fleming. Years later, Gable said that whenever his career would start to fade, a re-release of Gone with the Wind would soon revive his popularity, and he continued as a top leading actor for the rest of his life. One reissue publicized "Clark Gable never tires of holding Vivien Leigh".

=== 1939–1942: Established star ===
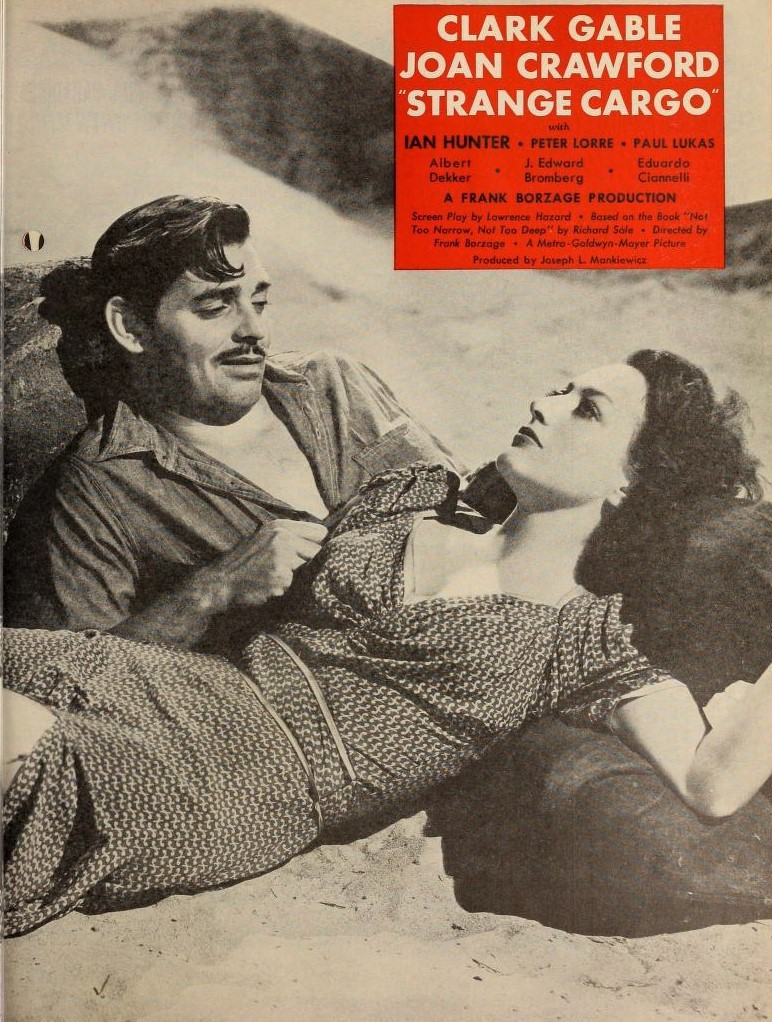
Gable and Crawford in Strange Cargo (1940)

Between his marriage to Lombard and her death, Gable again costarred with Norma Shearer in the World War II romantic intrigue film, Idiot's Delight (1939). He plays a nightclub singer that doesn't recognize former love (Shearer) while Nazis are closing in on guests at a hotel on the brink of war. The film is memorable for Gable's song and dance routine, "Puttin' on the Ritz" and an alternative ending.

Gable also starred in Strange Cargo (1940), a romantic drama with Joan Crawford, costarring Peter Lorre and Ian Hunter. The film's focus is on Gable and French Devil's Islands convicts in an escape from the penal colony, who on the way pick up a local entertainer (Crawford) whom Gable had met earlier in the movie. In their eighth and last film together, Gable and Crawford "again demonstrated their on-screen magic" and the film was among the top ten grossing films for the year.

Gable then made his first film with 20-year old Lana Turner, a newcomer whom MGM saw as a successor for both Crawford and the now-deceased Jean Harlow. Honky Tonk (1941) is a western where Gable's con-man/gambler character romances Turner, a prim, young judge's daughter. , Gable had been reluctant to act opposite the younger Turner in the required romantic scenes. But their chemistry served them well in this and three later films, with Honky Tonk finishing third at the box office that year.

Since the couple had been popular with the public, Gable and Turner were quickly paired again in Somewhere I'll Find You (1941) as war correspondents who travel to the Pacific theatre and get caught up in a Japanese attack. The movie was another hit finishing No. 8 at the box office for 1942. From 1934 until 1942, when World War II interrupted his movie career, he was the top of the box office money-makers lists. Film historian David Thomson wrote the quality of his movies after Gone With the Wind "hardly befitted a national idol" and began a career decline for Gable.

=== 1942–1944: World War II ===
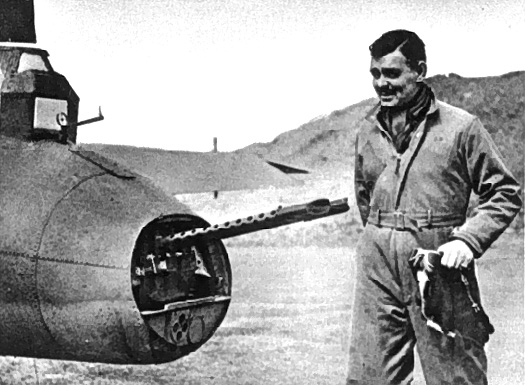
Gable with an 8th Air Force Boeing B-17 Flying Fortress in England, 1943

On August 12, 1942, following Lombard's death and his completion of the film Somewhere I'll Find You, Gable joined the United States Army, under the Army Air Forces. Lombard had suggested that Gable enlist as part of the war effort, but MGM was reluctant to let him go. Commanding General of the U.S. Army Air Forces Henry H. "Hap" Arnold offered Gable a "special assignment" with the First Motion Picture Unit following basic training. The Washington Star reported that Gable took a physical examination at Bolling Field on June 19, preliminary to joining the service.

"Mr. Gable, it was learned from a source outside the war department, conferred with Lieutenant General H. H. Arnold, head of the air forces yesterday." The Star continued, "It was understood that Mr. Gable, if he is commissioned, will make movies for the air forces. Lieutenant Jimmy Stewart, another actor in uniform, has been doing this."

Gable had expressed an earlier interest in officer candidate school, with the intention of becoming an aerial gunner upon enlisting in bomber training school. MGM arranged for his studio friend, the cinematographer Andrew McIntyre, to enlist with him and accompany him through training.

On August 17, 1942, shortly after his enlistment, he and McIntyre were sent to Miami Beach, Florida, where they entered USAAF OCS Class 42-E. Both completed training on October 28, 1942, and were commissioned as second lieutenants. His class of about 2,600 students (of which he ranked about 700th) selected Gable as its graduation speaker. General Arnold presented the cadets with their commissions. Arnold then informed Gable of his special assignment: to make a recruiting film in combat with the Eighth Air Force to recruit aerial gunners. Gable and McIntyre were immediately sent to Flexible Gunnery School at Tyndall Field, Florida, followed by a photography course at Fort George Wright, Washington State and promoted to first lieutenants upon its completion.

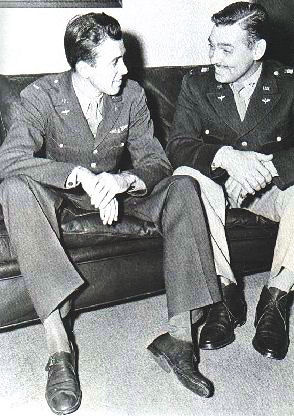
James Stewart and Gable, 1943

On January 27, 1943, Gable reported to Biggs Army Airfield, Texas to train with and accompany the 351st Bomb Group to England as head of a six-man motion picture unit. In addition to McIntyre, he recruited the screenwriter John Lee Mahin, camera operators Sgts. Mario Toti and Robert Boles, and the sound man Lt. Howard Voss, to complete his crew. Gable was promoted to captain while he was with the 351st Bomb Group at Pueblo Army Air Base, Colorado, a rank commensurate with his position as a unit commander. (Prior to this, he and McIntyre were both first lieutenants.)

Gable spent most of 1943 in England at RAF Polebrook with the 351st Bomb Group. Gable flew five combat missions, including one to Germany, as an observer-gunner in B-17 Flying Fortresses between May 4 and September 23, 1943, earning the Air Medal and the Distinguished Flying Cross for his efforts. During one of the missions, Gable's aircraft was damaged by flak and attacked by fighters, which knocked out one of the engines and shot up the stabilizer. In the raid on Germany, one crewman was killed and two others were wounded, and flak went through Gable's boot and narrowly missed his head. When word of this reached MGM, studio executives began to badger the Army Air Forces to reassign its most valuable screen actor to noncombat duty. Many of the men he served with, such as former Tech. Sgt. Ralph Cowley, said Gable actually unofficially joined other missions and the above five were only a fraction of the total. Adolf Hitler favored Gable above all other actors. During World War II, Hitler offered a sizable reward to anyone who could capture and bring Gable to him unscathed.

In November 1943, Gable returned to the United States to edit his film, on an old Warner's lot donated to the war effort, assigned to the 18th AAF Base Unit (Motion Picture Unit) at Culver City, California, where other stars contributed with any film equipment they had as well. In June 1944, Gable was promoted to major. While he hoped for another combat assignment, he had been placed on inactive duty and on June 12, 1944, his discharge papers were signed by Captain (later U.S. president) Ronald Reagan. Gable completed editing of the film Combat America in September 1944, giving the narration himself and making use of numerous interviews with enlisted gunners as focus of the film.

Because his motion picture production schedule made it impossible for him to fulfill reserve officer duties, he resigned his commission on September 26, 1947, a week after the Air Force became an independent service branch. Gable was awarded military honors for service: the Distinguished Flying Cross, Air Medal, American Campaign Medal, European-African-Middle Eastern Campaign Medal, and World War II Victory Medal. He was a qualified aerial gunner having received his wings upon completion of flexible gunnery school at Tyndall field.

In recent years, an anecdotal story has circulated particularly on Facebook, that Gable visited Bangor in Northern Ireland during 1944. This in turn has been reiterated in the Newsletter and on the BBC N.Ireland website . No evidence exists to support the claim. The US National Archives holds Gable's Military Personnel File within Record Group 319, containing documents from throughout his service, including papers signed by Gable in the United States before, after and during the time he was purportedly in Bangor.

=== 1945–1953: After World War II ===
Immediately after his discharge from the service, Gable returned to his ranch and rested. Personally, he resumed a pre-war relationship with Virginia Grey, a co-star from Test Pilot and Idiot's Delight, that newspapers reported might be the next Mrs. Gable. Professionally, Gable's first movie after World War II was Adventure (1946), with Greer Garson, by then the leading female star at MGM. Given the famous teaser tagline "Gable's back, and Garson's got him", the film was a commercial hit, earning over $6 million, but a critical failure.

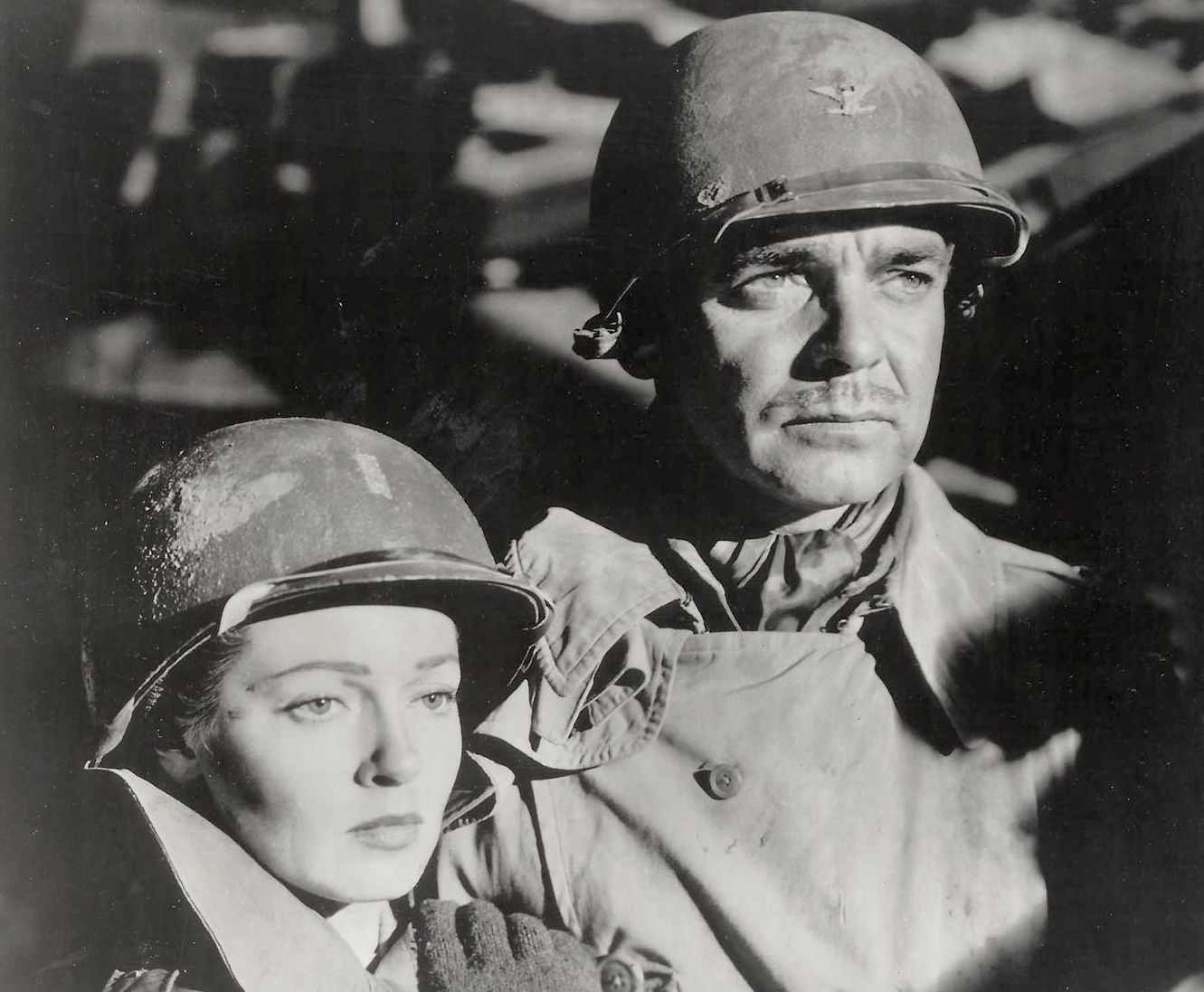
Turner and Gable in Homecoming (1948)

Gable was acclaimed for his performance in The Hucksters (1947), a satire of post-war Madison Avenue corruption and immorality, which co-starred Deborah Kerr and Ava Gardner. The film was popular with audiences, placing 11th at the box office, but both Variety and The New York Times reviewed it as a sanitized version of the novel with script issues, that was heavy on Gable screentime, who struggled in the role. Gable followed this up with Homecoming (1948), where he played a married doctor enlisting in World War II and meeting Lana Turner's army surgical nurse character with a romance unfolding in flashbacks. After that he made the war film Command Decision (1948), a psychological drama with Walter Pidgeon, Van Johnson, Brian Donlevy, and John Hodiak. It was a hit with audiences, but it lost MGM money due to the high cost of the all-star cast. Variety said, "[Gable's] is a believable delivery, interpreting the brigadier-general who must send his men out to almost certain death with an understanding that bespeaks his sympathy with the soldier... ".

A very public and brief romance with Paulette Goddard occurred after that. In 1949, Gable married Sylvia Ashley, a British model and actress previously married to Douglas Fairbanks Sr. The relationship was profoundly unsuccessful; they divorced in 1952. Gable did a series of films with female co-stars: Any Number Can Play (1950) with Alexis Smith, Key to the City (1950) with Loretta Young, and To Please a Lady (1950) with Barbara Stanwyck. They were reasonably popular, but he had more success with two Westerns: Across the Wide Missouri (1951), and Lone Star (1952). He then made Never Let Me Go (1953) opposite Gene Tierney. Tierney was a favorite of Gable's, and he was very disappointed when her mental health problems caused her to be replaced in Mogambo by Grace Kelly.

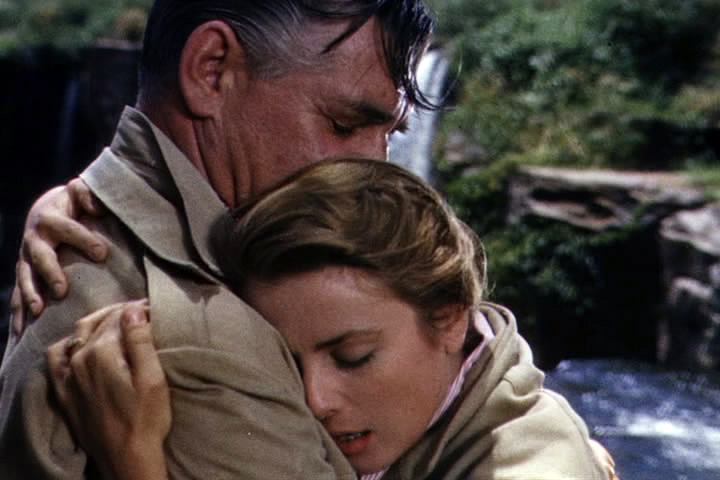
Gable and Grace Kelly in Mogambo (1953)

Mogambo (1953), directed by John Ford, was a somewhat sanitized and more action-oriented remake of Gable's hit pre-Code film Red Dust, with Jean Harlow and Mary Astor. Ava Gardner, in her third and final pairing with Gable, was well received in Harlow's leading lady role, as was Kelly in Astor's role, with both receiving Academy Award nominations, Gardner for Lead Actress and Kelly for Supporting Actress. While on location in Africa, reports of an affair between Gable and Kelly began to surface (the result of private dinners the stars were having), but their relationship was an intense friendship according to costar Gardner, with Kelly herself later commenting on the lack of any sexual aspect, "maybe because of the age difference". The publicity only helped ticket sales as the film finished No. 7 at the box office, grossing 8.2 million for the year, easily his most popular hit since he returned to MGM after the war.

=== 1954–1957: Leaving MGM ===
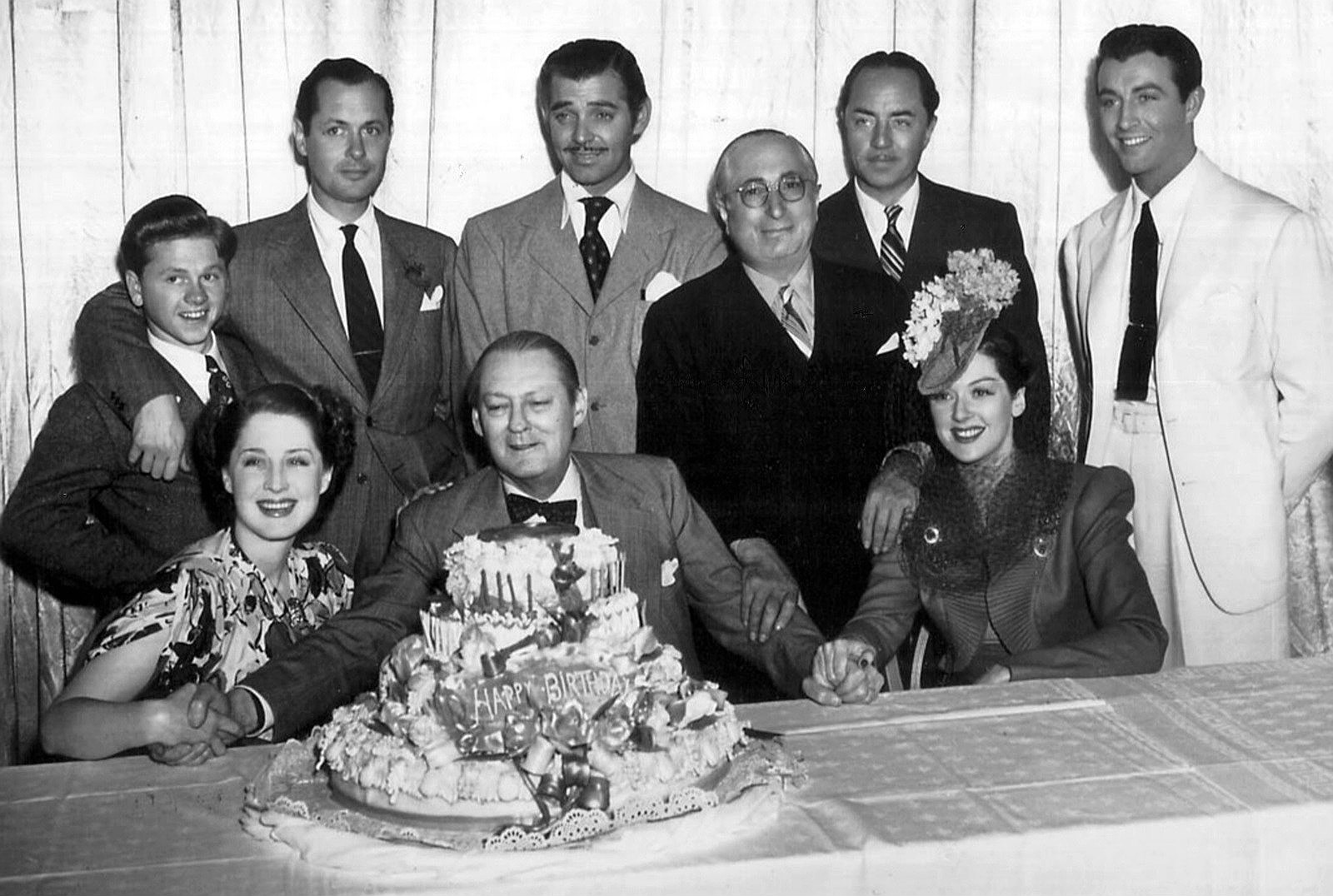
Lionel Barrymore's 61st birthday in 1939, standing: Mickey Rooney, Robert Montgomery, Clark Gable, Louis B. Mayer, William Powell, Robert Taylor, seated: Norma Shearer, Lionel Barrymore, and Rosalind Russell

Despite the positive critical and public response to Mogambo, Gable became increasingly unhappy with what he considered mediocre roles offered by MGM, while the studio regarded his salary as excessive. Studio head Louis B. Mayer was fired in 1951, amid slumping revenue and increased Hollywood production costs, due in large part to the rising popularity of television. The new studio head, former production chief Dore Schary, struggled to maintain profits for the studio. Many long-time MGM stars were fired, or their contracts were not renewed, including Greer Garson and Judy Garland. Gable refused to renew his contract. His last film at MGM was Betrayed (1954), an espionage wartime drama with Turner and Victor Mature. Critic Paul Mavis wrote, "Gable and Turner just don't click the way they should here...poor plots and lines never stopped these two pros from turning in good performances in other films." In March 1954, Gable left MGM.

His next two films were made for 20th Century Fox: Soldier of Fortune, an adventure story in Hong Kong with Susan Hayward, and The Tall Men (1955), a Western with Jane Russell and Robert Ryan. Both were profitable, although only modest successes, earning Gable his first profit sharing royalties. In 1955, Gable would be 10th at the box office – the last time he was in the top ten. That same year, Gable married fifth wife Kay Spreckels (née Kathleen Williams). A former fashion model and actress, she had previously been married three times: first to Charles Capps (1937–39), then to Argentinian cattle tycoon Martín de Alzaga (1942–43), and to sugar-refining heir Adolph B. Spreckels Jr. (1945–52). Gable became stepfather to her son Bunker Spreckels, who went on to live a notorious celebrity lifestyle in the late 1960s and early 1970s surfing scene, ultimately leading to his early death in 1977.

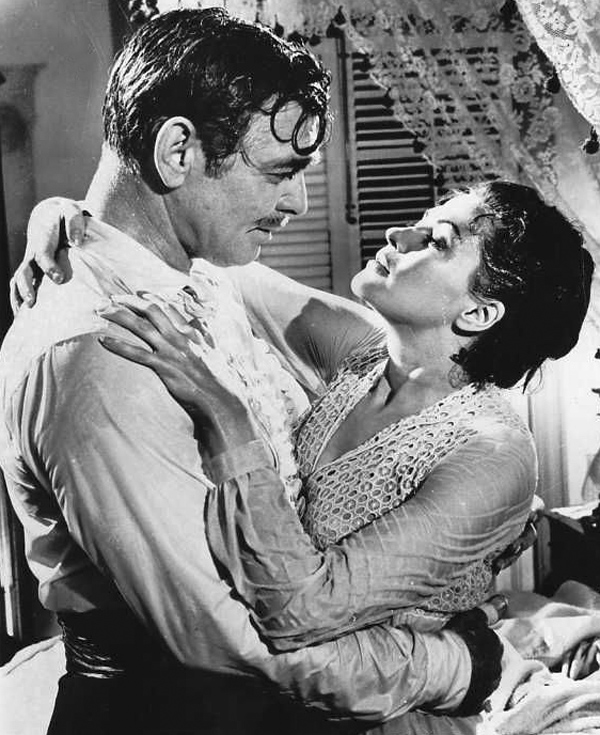
Gable and Yvonne De Carlo in Band of Angels (1957)

Gable also formed Russ-Field-Gabco in 1955, a production company with Jane Russell and her husband Bob Waterfield, and they produced The King and Four Queens (1956), a film Gable thought would also star Russell to capitalize on The Tall Men's moderate success. That role instead went to Jo Van Fleet. It was Gable's only time as producer. He found producing and acting to be too much work and this Raoul Walsh western was the only film made. After turning down the lead role in Universal-International's Away All Boats, his next project was the Warner Bros. production Band of Angels (1957), co-starring Yvonne De Carlo and featuring relative newcomer Sidney Poitier; it was not well received, despite Gable's role's similarities to Rhett Butler. Newsweek said, "Here is a movie so bad that it must be seen to be disbelieved."

=== 1958–1961: Paramount and The Misfits ===
Next, he paired with Doris Day in Teacher's Pet (1958), shot in black and white at Paramount. He did Run Silent, Run Deep (also 1958), with co-star and producer Burt Lancaster, which featured his first on-screen death since 1937, and which garnered good reviews. Gable started to receive television offers, but rejected them outright. At 57, Gable finally acknowledged, "Now it's time I acted my age". His contracts began including a clause that his filming and work days ended at 5 p.m.

His next two films were light comedies for Paramount: But Not for Me (1959) with Carroll Baker, and It Started in Naples (1960) with Sophia Loren. Naples was written and directed by Melville Shavelson and it mainly showed the beauty of Loren and the Italian island Capri. It was a box-office success and was nominated for an Academy Award for Art Direction and two Golden Globes, one for Picture, Comedy/Musical and Loren for Actress, Comedy. Filmed mostly on location in Italy, it was Gable's last film released in color. While there Gable's weight had increased to 230 pounds (100 kg), something he credited to pasta, and he started on a crash diet to achieve a goal weight of 195, along with briefly quitting drinking and smoking, to pass a required physical for his next movie.

On February 8, 1960, Gable received a star on the Hollywood Walk of Fame for his work in motion pictures, located at 1608 Vine Street.

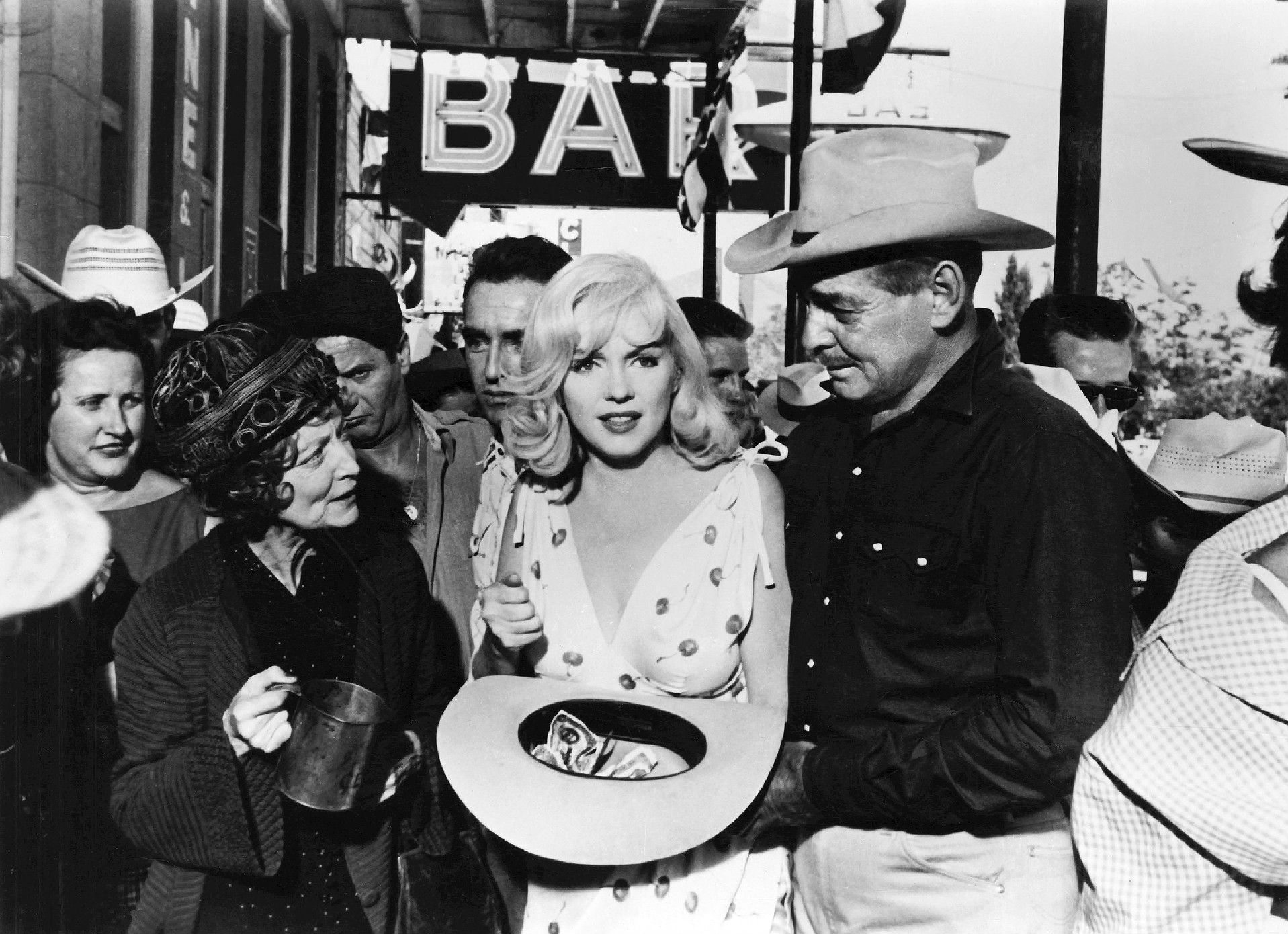
Marilyn Monroe and Gable with Eli Wallach and Montgomery Clift (in the background) in The Misfits (1961)

Gable's last film was The Misfits (1961), with a script by Arthur Miller and directed by John Huston. Co-starring with Gable were Marilyn Monroe, Montgomery Clift, Eli Wallach, Thelma Ritter and Rex Bell. Many critics regard Gable's performance to be his finest, and Gable, after seeing the rough cuts, agreed, although the film did not receive any Oscar nominations. Miller wrote the screenplay for his wife Monroe; it was about two aging cowboys and a pilot that go mustanging in Reno, Nevada, who all fall for a blonde. In 1961, it was a somewhat disconnected film with its antihero western themes, but it has since become a classic.

Portraitist Al Hirschfeld created a drawing, and then a lithograph, portraying the film's stars Clift, Monroe, and Gable with screenwriter Miller, in what is suggested as a typical "on-the-set" scene during the troubled production. In a 2002 documentary Eli Wallach recalled the mustang wrangling scenes Gable insisted on performing himself, "You have to pass a physical to film that" and "He was a professional going home at 5 p.m. to a pregnant wife". The New York Times found "Mr. Gable's performance as a leathery old cowboy with a realistic slant on most plain things" ironically vital, with his death before the film's release.

== Critical reception and commentary ==
Film critic Pauline Kael wrote of Gable: his was a "bold open challenge to women" and his unspoken question was "Well sister, what do you say?" with the idea that "if she said no, she was failing what might almost be nature's test. She'd become overcivilized, afraid of her instincts, afraid of being a woman." Kael goes on to describe Gable's sex scenes as "violent and primal."

== Filmography ==
Gable is known to have appeared as an "extra" in 13 films between 1924 and 1930. He then appeared in a total of 67 theatrically released motion pictures, as himself in 17 "short subject" films, and he narrated and appeared in a 1945 World War II propaganda film entitled Combat America, produced by the United States Army Air Forces.

Gable was one of the most consistent box-office performers in the history of Hollywood, appearing on Quigley Publishing's annual Top Ten Money Making Stars Poll sixteen times. He appeared opposite many of the most popular actresses of their time. Joan Crawford was a favorite actress of his to work with, and he partnered with her in eight films. Myrna Loy worked with him seven times, and he was paired with Jean Harlow in six productions. He also starred with Lana Turner in four features, and in three each with Norma Shearer and Ava Gardner. Gable died of a heart attack at the age of 59; his final on-screen appearance was as an aging cowboy in The Misfits, released posthumously in 1961.

== Personal life ==
=== Marriages and children ===
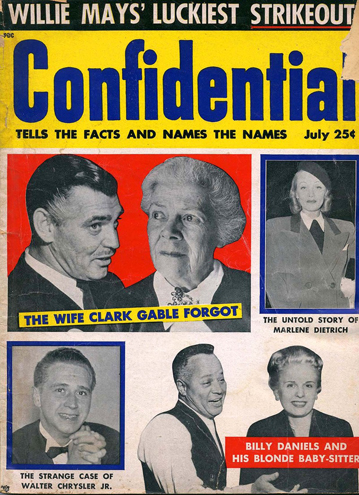
1957 Confidential Magazine with article about Gable's first wife Josephine Dillon

Gable married five times and was linked romantically to many other women. His first engagement was to actress Franz Dorfler when he was about 21. Dorfler introduced Gable to Josephine Dillon, who would become his acting coach, manager, and then his wife. When Gable and Dillon married on December 13, 1924, in California, Gable was 23 and Dillon was 40; the couple divorced in 1930. His second wife was Texas socialite Maria Franklin Prentiss Lucas Langham Gable (nicknamed "Ria"). The couple married on June 19, 1931, in California and divorced on March 7, 1939. Thirteen days after his divorce from Maria, Gable married actress Carole Lombard during a production break on Gone with the Wind.

==== Carole Lombard ====
Gable's relationship with and marriage in 1939 to his third wife, actress Carole Lombard (1908–1942), was one of the happiest periods of his personal life. They met while filming 1932's No Man of Her Own, when Lombard was still married to actor William Powell. A Gable and Lombard romance did not take off until 1936, after becoming reacquainted at a party. They were soon inseparable, with fan magazines and tabloids citing them as an official couple.

Gable thrived being around Lombard's youthful, charming, and frank personality, once stating:

You can trust that little screwball with your life or your hopes or your weaknesses, and she wouldn't even know how to think about letting you down.

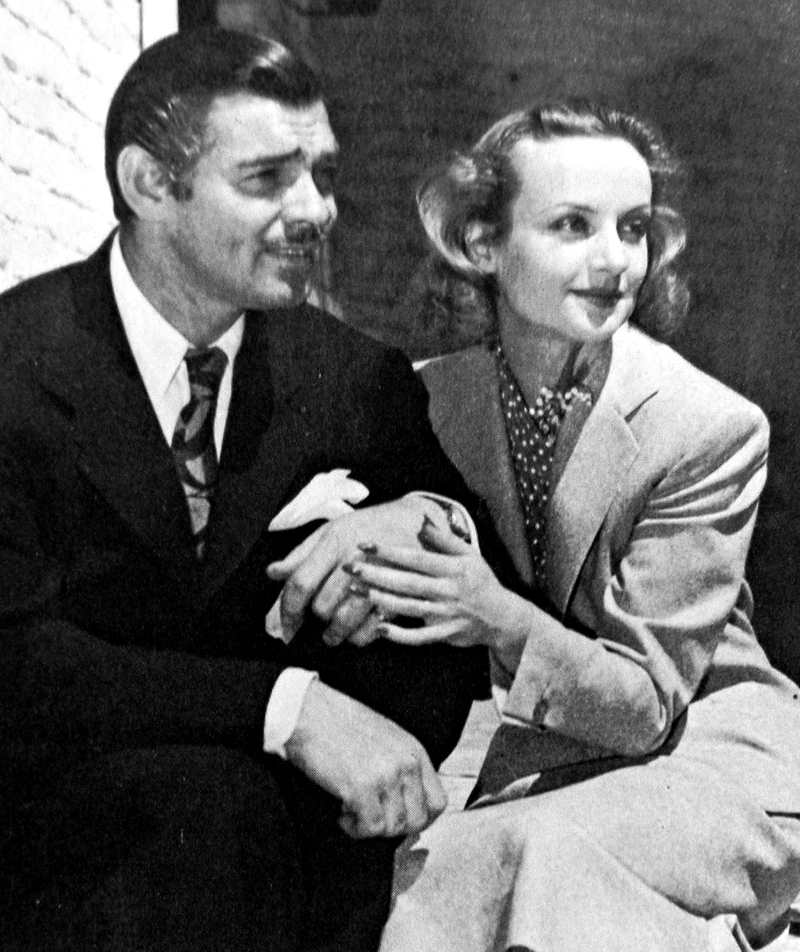
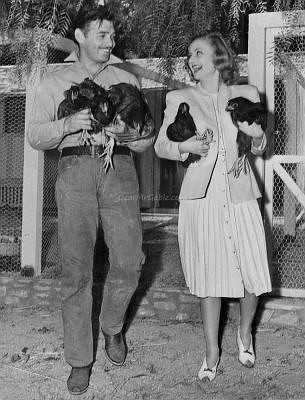
Gable with Lombard after their 1939 honeymoon (left) and at their Encino, California ranch (right)

Gable was still legally married, having prolonged an expensive divorce from his second wife, Ria Langham, until his salary from Gone with the Wind enabled him to reach a divorce settlement with her on March 7, 1939. On March 29, during a production break on Gone with the Wind, Gable and Lombard were married in Kingman, Arizona, and honeymooned in room 1201 of the Arizona Biltmore Hotel. They purchased a ranch previously owned by director Raoul Walsh in Encino, California, for $50,000, making it their home. The couple, who lovingly referred to each other as "Ma and Pa", owned a menagerie of animals and raised chickens and horses there. With the bombing of Pearl Harbor many Hollywood stars joined the war effort, some such as James Stewart signing up for active duty. Carole Lombard sent a telegram to President Roosevelt on behalf of Gable expressing his interest in doing so, but F.D.R. thought the 41-year-old actor could best serve by increased patriotic roles in movies and bond drives, which Lombard tirelessly began.

On January 16, 1942, Lombard was a passenger on Transcontinental and Western Air Flight 3 with her mother and press agent Otto Winkler. She had just finished her 57th film, To Be or Not to Be, and was on her way home from a successful war bond selling tour when the flight's Douglas DC-3 airliner crashed into Potosi Mountain near Las Vegas, Nevada, killing all 22 passengers aboard, including 15 servicemen en route to training in California. Gable flew to the crash site to claim the bodies of his wife, mother-in-law, and Winkler, who had been the best man at Gable and Lombard's wedding. Lombard was declared to be the first war-related American female casualty of World War II, and Gable received a personal note of condolence from President Roosevelt. The Civil Aeronautics Board investigation into the crash concluded that pilot error was its cause.

Gable returned to their Encino ranch and carried out her funeral wishes as she had requested in her will. A month later, he returned to the studio to work with Lana Turner in their second film together, Somewhere I'll Find You. Having lost 20 pounds (9.1 kg) since the tragedy, Gable evidently was emotionally and physically devastated, but Turner stated that Gable remained a "consummate professional" for the duration of filming. He acted in 27 more films, and remarried twice more. "But he was never the same", according to Esther Williams. "He had been devastated by Carole's death."

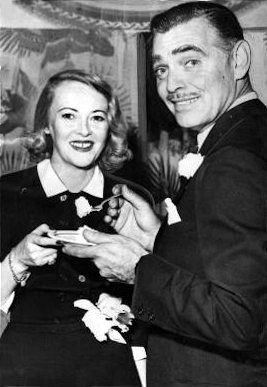
With fourth wife Sylvia Ashley

==== Sylvia Ashley ====
In 1949, Gable married Sylvia Ashley, an English model and actress who was the widow of Douglas Fairbanks; the couple divorced in 1952.

==== Kay Spreckels ====
In 1955, Gable married Kay Spreckels (née Kathleen Williams), a thrice-married former fashion model and actress who had previously been married to the son of Adolph B. Spreckels. Four months after Gable's 1960 death, she gave birth to Gable's only son, John Clark Gable. His son had two children including Clark James Gable.

==== Relationship with Loretta Young ====
During the filming of The Call of the Wild in early 1935, the film's lead actress, Loretta Young, became pregnant with Clark Gable's child. Gable reportedly had sex with Young while on an overnight train from a studio location to Hollywood. Their daughter, Judy Lewis, was born on November 6, 1935, in Venice, California. Young hid her pregnancy in an elaborate scheme. Nineteen months after the birth, she claimed to have adopted the baby. Most in Hollywood (and some in the general public) believed Gable was Lewis' father because of their strong resemblance and the timing of her birth. In 1950, Gable came to Young's house for a brief visit. Gable asked Lewis about her life and then, upon leaving, kissed her on her forehead. It was the only time that Lewis ever spoke to Gable and, at the time, she had no idea that he was her father. Gable was aware of his paternity, but never publicly acknowledged that he was Lewis's father.

As an adult, Lewis spoke of the confusion, isolation, and alienation she felt within her own family while growing up. Five years after Gable's death, when confronted by Lewis, Young said that she was Lewis' biological mother and that Gable was her father. Young died on August 12, 2000; Young's autobiography, published posthumously, confirmed that Gable was indeed Lewis' father and added that Young and Gable had had a "brief fling". Lewis died of cancer at age 76 on November 25, 2011. In 2015, Young's daughter-in-law alleged that Young had said in 1998 that Lewis was conceived by date rape. Young's family had chosen to remain silent about the information until both Young and Lewis were deceased.

==== Relationship with Joan Blondell ====
In 1945, while filming Adventure for Victor Fleming, Gable proposed marriage to his co-star Joan Blondell, which she declined.

=== Politics ===
Gable was a conservative Republican. In 1944, Gable became an early member of the conservative Motion Picture Alliance for the Preservation of American Ideals, a group explicitly created to help root out communists from the film industry. In addition to Gable, its members included such industry figures as Walt Disney, Ayn Rand, Ronald Reagan, and John Wayne; they helped create and enforce the Hollywood blacklist, often by testifying under oath before the House Un-American Activities Committee.

In 1933, Gable was initiated into Freemasonry at the Beverly Hills Lodge No. 528 California.

=== Illness and death ===
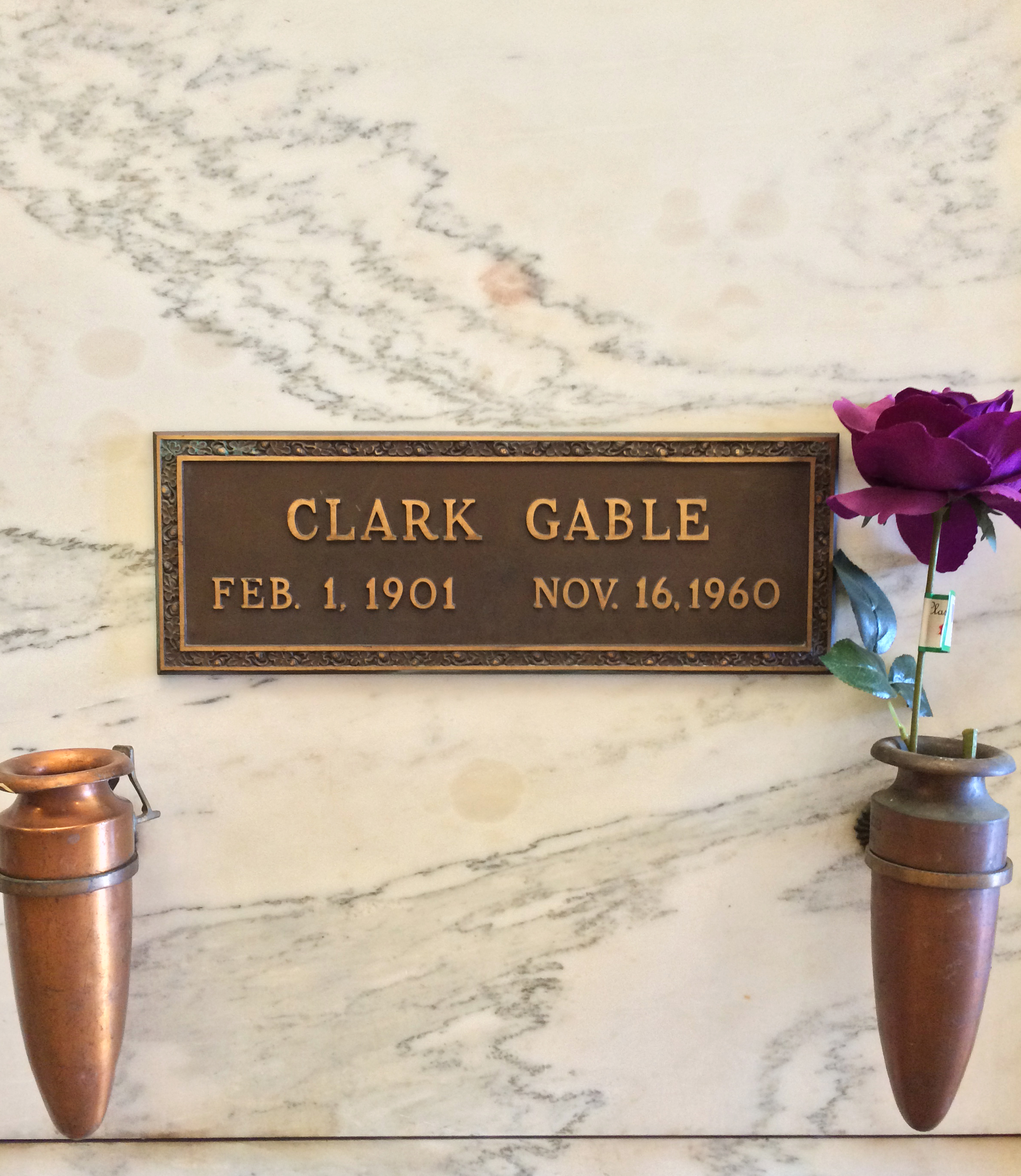
Gable's crypt in the Sanctuary of Trust of the Great Mausoleum at Forest Lawn, Glendale

On November 6, 1960, Gable was sent to Hollywood Presbyterian Medical Center in Los Angeles, where doctors found that he had suffered a heart attack. Newspaper reports the following day listed his condition as satisfactory. By the morning of November 16, he seemed to be improving, but he died that evening at the age of 59 from a second heart attack caused by an infection. Medical staff did not perform cardiopulmonary resuscitation for fear that the procedure would rupture Gable's heart, and a defibrillator was not available.

Gable is interred in the Great Mausoleum, Memorial Terrace, at Glendale's Forest Lawn Memorial Park next to Carole Lombard and her mother. An honor guard and pallbearers Spencer Tracy and James Stewart were in attendance. Twenty-two years later Kay Gable died and was interred there as well.

== Style and reception ==
In a photo essay of Hollywood film stars, Life magazine called Gable, "All man ... and then some."

Doris Day summed up Gable's unique personality: "He was as masculine as any man I've ever known, and as much a little boy as a grown man could be—it was this combination that had such a devastating effect on women."

Joan Crawford—Gable's eight-time co-star, longtime friend, and on-again, off-again girlfriend—stated on David Frost's TV show in January 1970 that Gable "was a king wherever he went. He earned the title. He walked like one, he behaved like one, and he was the most masculine man that I have ever met in my life. Gable had balls".

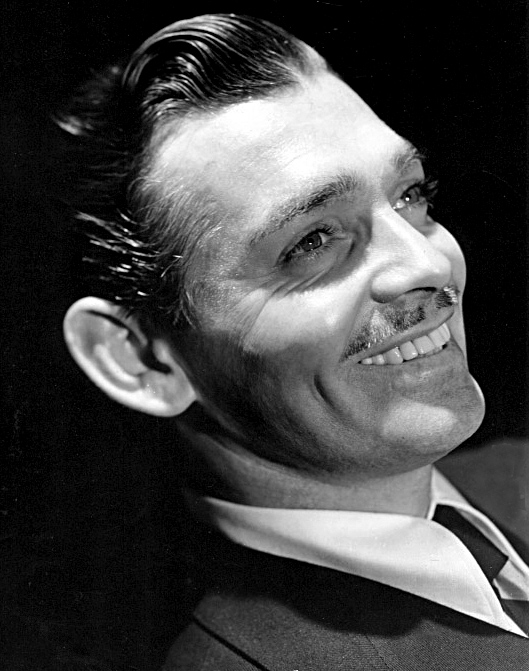
Gable in 1938

Robert Taylor said Gable "was a great, great guy, and certainly one of the great stars of all times, if not the greatest. I think that I sincerely doubt that there will ever be another like Clark Gable; he was one of a kind."

In his memoir Bring on the Empty Horses, David Niven states that Gable, a close friend, was extremely supportive after the sudden, accidental death of Niven's first wife, Primula (Primmie), in 1946. Primmie had supported Gable emotionally after Carole Lombard's death four years earlier: Niven recounts Gable kneeling at Primmie's feet and sobbing while she held and consoled him. Niven also states that Arthur Miller, the author of The Misfits, had described Gable as "the man who did not know how to hate."

Gable has been criticized for altering aspects of a script he felt were in conflict with his image. Screenwriter Larry Gelbart, as quoted in James Garner's biography stated that Gable, "refused to go down with the submarine, because Gable doesn't sink". (In reference to Gable's film Run Silent, Run Deep). The novel's author, Capt. Beach, noted changes should be made among the crew to get a Hollywood audience and where a subsequent battle sequence was altered when he should have had script approval, feeling his book was bought by United Artists for its title.

Eli Wallach recalls in his 2006 autobiography The Good, The Bad and Me, that what he felt was one of his best dramatic scenes in The Misfits was cut from the script. Wallach's character is emotionally crushed when he visits Roslyn (Marilyn Monroe), and instead runs into Gable's character and realizes any hope with Roslyn is dashed. Gable asked (within his contractual rights) that the scene be removed, and when Wallach spoke to him, Gable explained he felt that "his character would never steal a woman from a friend."

== In popular culture ==
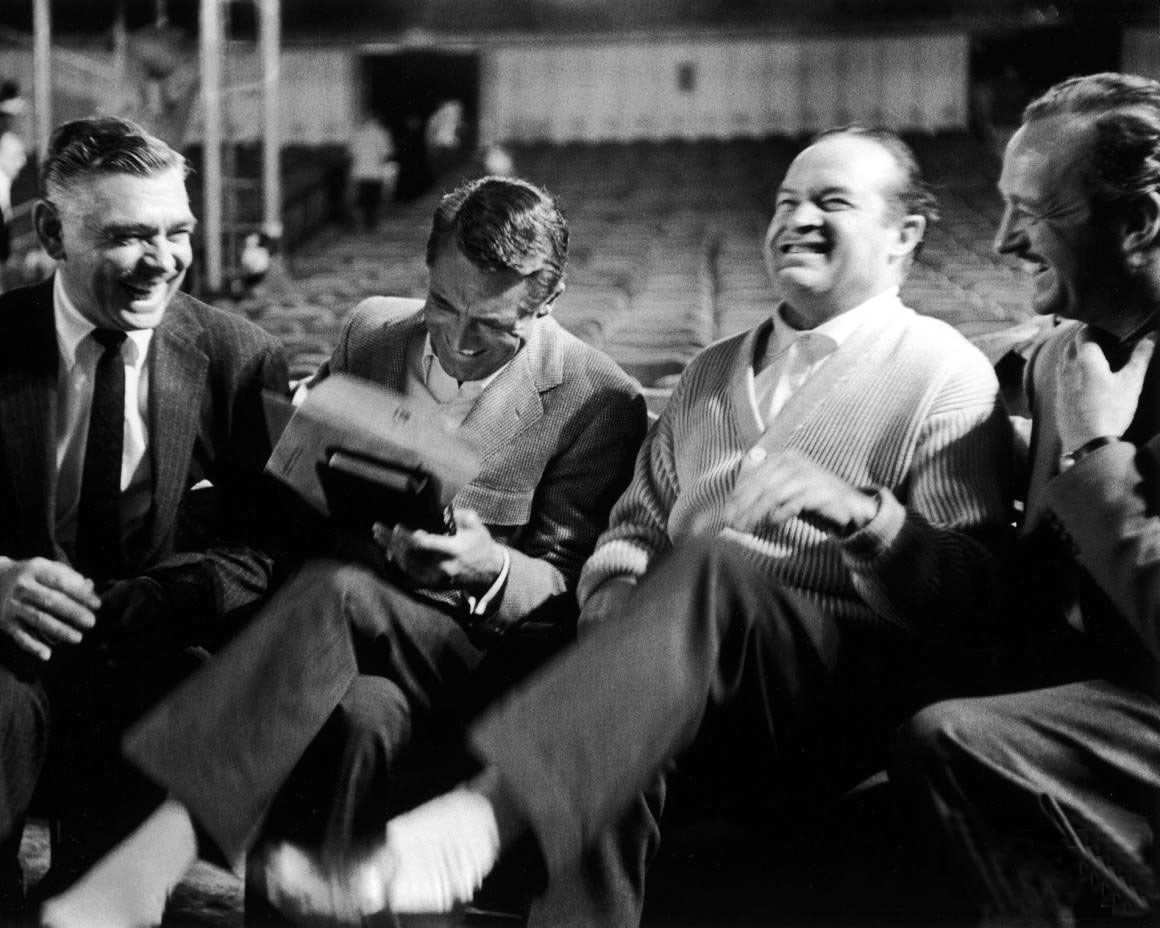
Gable, Cary Grant, Bob Hope and David Niven laughing in the 1950s

Warner Bros. cartoons sometimes caricatured Gable. Examples include: Have You Got Any Castles? (in which his face appears seven times inside the novel The House of the Seven Gables), The Coo-Coo Nut Grove (in which his ears flap on their own), Hollywood Steps Out (in which he follows an enigmatic woman), Cats Don't Dance (in which he appears on a billboard promotion for Gone with the Wind and on the backlot of MGM), and Jungle Jitters (where the queen of a village imagines a traveling salesman as Gable).

He also appears in Disney cartoons like Mickey's Polo Team, where he is flirting with Clarabelle Cow, and The Autograph Hound.

Bugs Bunny's nonchalant carrot-chewing standing position, as explained by Chuck Jones, Friz Freleng, and Bob Clampett, originated in a scene in the film It Happened One Night (1934), in which Clark Gable's character leans against a fence, eating carrots rapidly and talking with his mouth full to Claudette Colbert's character. This scene was well known while the film was popular, and viewers at the time likely recognized Bugs Bunny's behavior as parody.

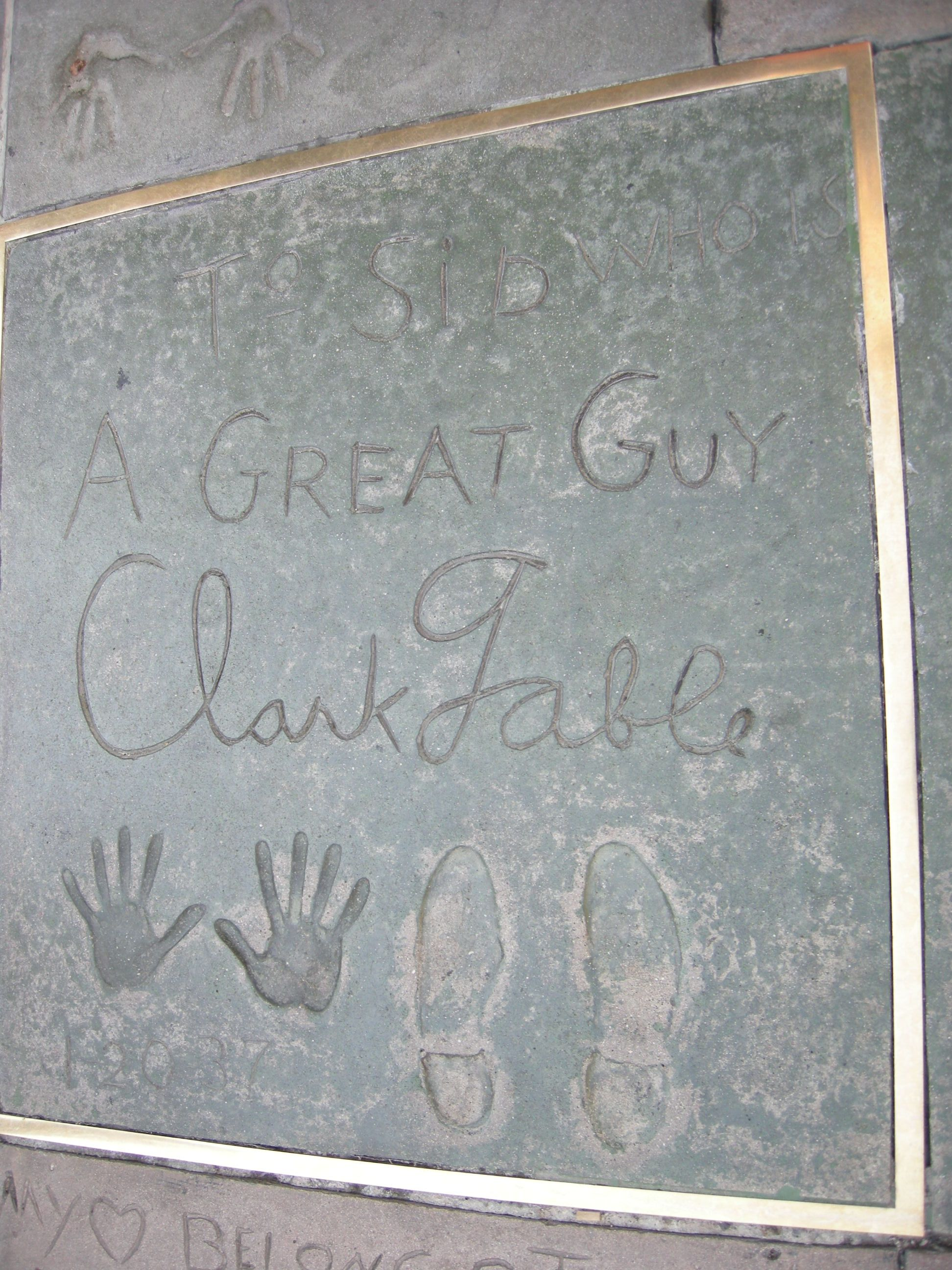
Gable's block in the forecourt of Grauman's Chinese Theatre.

In January 1937, Gable was honored with a block in the forecourt of Grauman's Chinese Theatre.

Along with actor Kent Taylor, Clark Gable served as the inspiration behind the name of Superman's alter-ego Clark Kent.

In the 1937 film Broadway Melody of 1938, Judy Garland (aged 15) sings "You Made Me Love You" while looking at a composite picture of Gable. The opening lines are: "Dear Mr Gable, I am writing this to you, and I hope that you will read it so you'll know, my heart beats like a hammer, and I stutter and I stammer, every time I see you at the picture show, I guess I'm just another fan of yours, and I thought I'd write and tell you so. You made me love you, I didn't want to do it, I didn't want to do it ..."

The 1948 Cole Porter tune "Always True to You in My Fashion" contains the lyrics "Mister Gable, I mean Clark / Wants me on his boat to park".

The 1975 film Monty Python and the Holy Grail contained a reference to impersonating Gable in the song performed by the Knights of the Round Table.

The 2003 music album Give Up by The Postal Service has a song titled "Clark Gable". The singer wants to "find a love that looks and sounds like a movie", and includes the lyric, "I kissed you in a style Clark Gable would have admired, I thought it classic".

Gable has been portrayed in a number of films. Actors who have played the role include: Phillip Waldron in It Happened in Hollywood (1937), James Brolin in Gable and Lombard (1976), Larry Pennell in Marilyn: The Untold Story (1980), Edward Winter in Moviola: The Scarlett O'Hara War (1980), Boyd Holister in Grace Kelly (1983), Gary Wayne in Malice in Wonderland (1985), Gene Daily in The Rocketeer (1991), Bobby Valentino in RKO 281 (1999), Bruce Hughes and Shayne Greenman in Blonde (2001), and Charles Unwin in Lucy (2003).

In Drunk History Season 3 2015 Miami episode 2, Josh Hartnett portrays Gable. The focus is on Gable's military service and his training in Miami.

He, along with Bette Davis and James Dean, are referenced in the lyrics of the song "Girl on TV" by the boy band LFO.

== Awards and nominations ==
Year	Association	Category	Nominated work	Result	Ref.
1935	Academy Awards	Best Actor	It Happened One Night	Won	
1936	Academy Awards	Best Actor	Mutiny on the Bounty	Nominated	
1940	Academy Awards	Best Actor	Gone with the Wind	Nominated	
1958	Laurel Awards	Top Male Comedy Performance	Teacher's Pet	3rd Place	
1959	Golden Globe Awards	Best Actor in a Motion Picture – Musical or Comedy	Teacher's Pet	Nominated	
1960	Golden Globe Awards	Best Actor in a Motion Picture – Musical or Comedy	But Not for Me	Nominated	
1960	Hollywood Walk of Fame	Star (motion pictures)	—N/a	Honored	
2001	Golden Boot Awards	Centennial Award (Note: Awarded posthumously; accepted by son John Clark Gable)	—N/a	Won	
2005	Online Film & Television Association	Film Hall of Fame	—N/a	Inducted	

== See also ==
- List of oldest and youngest Academy Award winners and nominees — Youngest winners for Best Lead Actor
- List of actors with Academy Award nominations
- List of actors with more than one Academy Award nomination in the acting categories
- List of members of the American Legion

== Bibliography ==
- Essoe, Gabe (1970). The Films of Clark Gable. Secaucus: The Cidadel Press. ISBN 978-0-8065-0011-9.
- Harris, Warren G. (2002). Clark Gable: A Biography. New York: Harmony Books. ISBN 978-0-609-60495-3.
- Lewis, Judy (1994). Uncommon Knowledge. New York: Simon & Schuster. ISBN 978-0-671-70019-5.
- Samuels, Charles (1962). The King: A Biography of Clark Gable. New York: G.P. Putnam's Sons. ISBN 978-1-258-80672-9.
- Spicer, Chrystopher J. (2002). Clark Gable: Biography, Filmography, Bibliography. Jefferson: McFarland & Company. ISBN 978-0-7864-1124-5.
- Tornabene, Lyn (1976). Long Live The King: A Biography of Clark Gable. New York: Putnam. ISBN 978-0-399-11863-0.
