= Delamere and Williams Type GAR =

Type GAR
- Type: BB machine gun
- Place of origin: Canada

Service history
- Used by: RCAF

Production history
- Designed: 1941
- Manufacturer: Delamere & Williams Limited, Toronto

Specifications
- Cartridge: .36 BB
- Caliber: .375 caliber
- Sights: Iron

The Delamere and Williams Type GAR is a .36 (.375) caliber pneumatic machine gun used by the Royal Canadian Air Force in world war 2 for aerial gunnery training.
