= William Lawrence Hanson =

American composer (born 1905)

William Lawrence Hanson (born 1905), was a composer of a variety of songs and was the composer/co-composer of the waltz "Dreaming of My Indiana Sweetheart". The song was performed in 1931 by Rudy Vallée and Morton Downey.

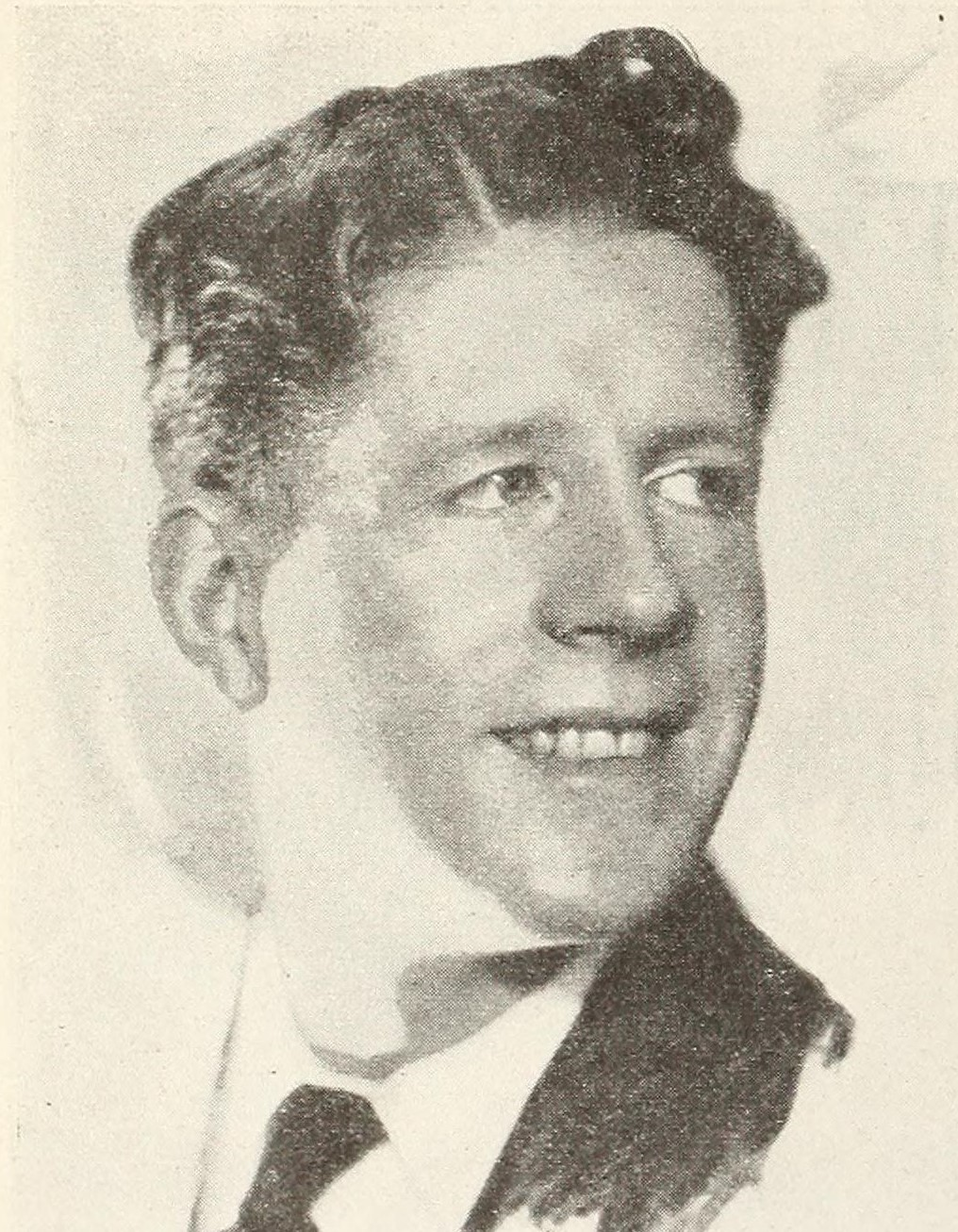
Rudy Vallée (1929)

He had composed two versions of the song:

- One with actress/dancer Barbara Bennett as co-composer, consisting of words and melody;
- One that he had composed himself for ukulele.

Both songs were copyrighted in 1931 and published by Phil Kornheiser Inc. of New York.

They were two U.S. copyrights which are the following:

The two copyrights for "Dreaming of My Indiana Sweetheart"
| Date of copyright | Authors | Arrangement |
|---|---|---|
| February 9, 1931 | Barbara Bennett and Bill Hansen | Words and melody |
| February 24, 1931 | Bill Hansen | Ukulele |

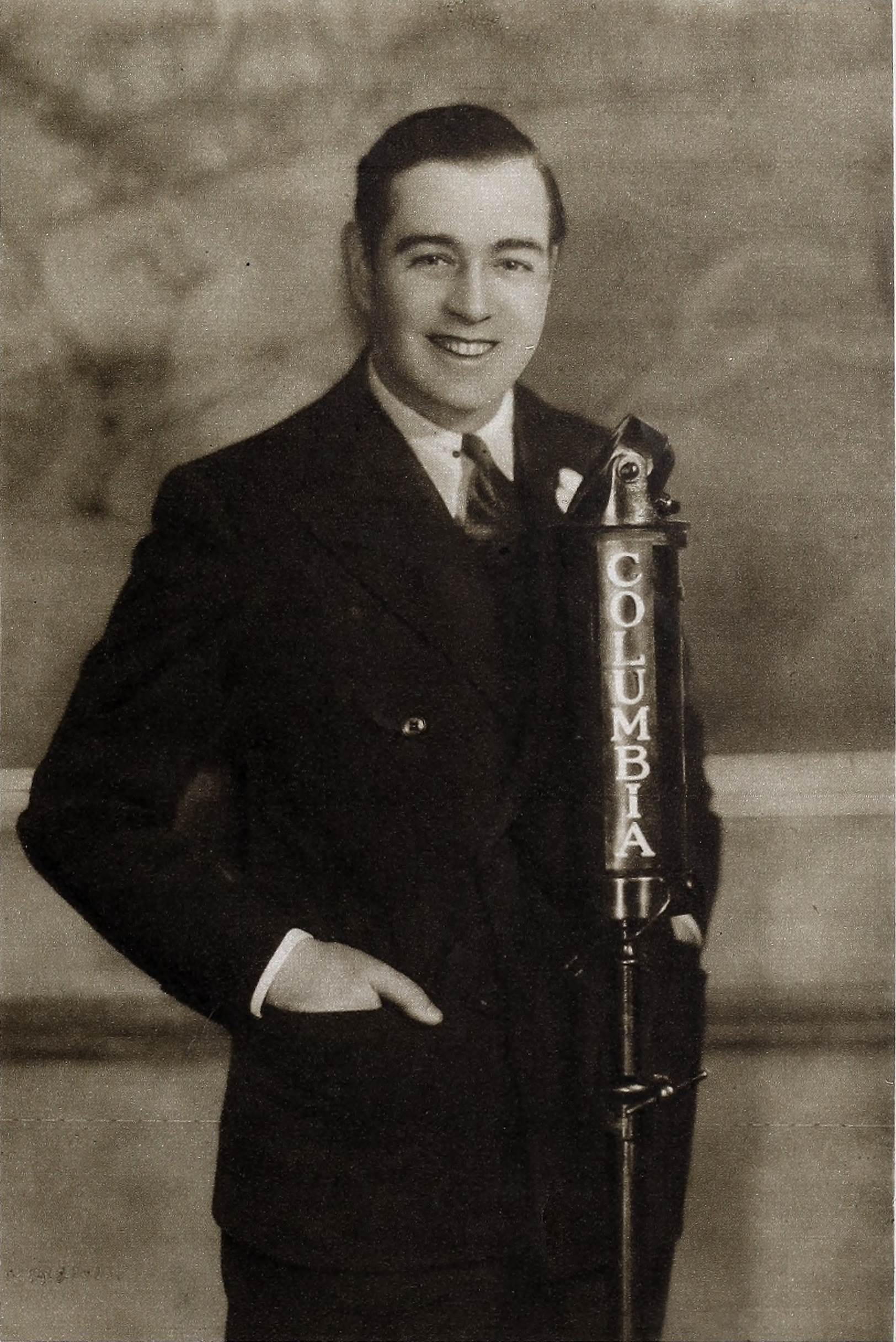
Morton Downey (1931)

== Performances for "Dreaming of My Indiana Sweetheart" ==
Musical artists in 1931 releases
| Performer | Arrangement |
|---|---|
| Rudy Vallée | Jack Mason |
| Morton Downey | |

== Career ==
After composing "Dreaming of My Indiana Sweetheart", Hansen had also composed a variety of songs under his name and under his pseudonym of Dale Wood. As Dale Wood, had a written a variety of songs with several notable composers and lyricists. Examples include Clay Boland, jazz musician Jack Lathrop, Murray Grand, and Michael Grace. As William Lawrence Hansen, his music experience was in the compilation and editing of music and text for song books and teleplays in the film and television industry for publication to the public. One such book was the 1951 release of the song book for the music for the 1942 film Bambi, and related entertainment industry song books. An exception was of having produced the University of Pennsylvania Songbook as Bill Hansen.

== Entertainment industry intellectual properties ==
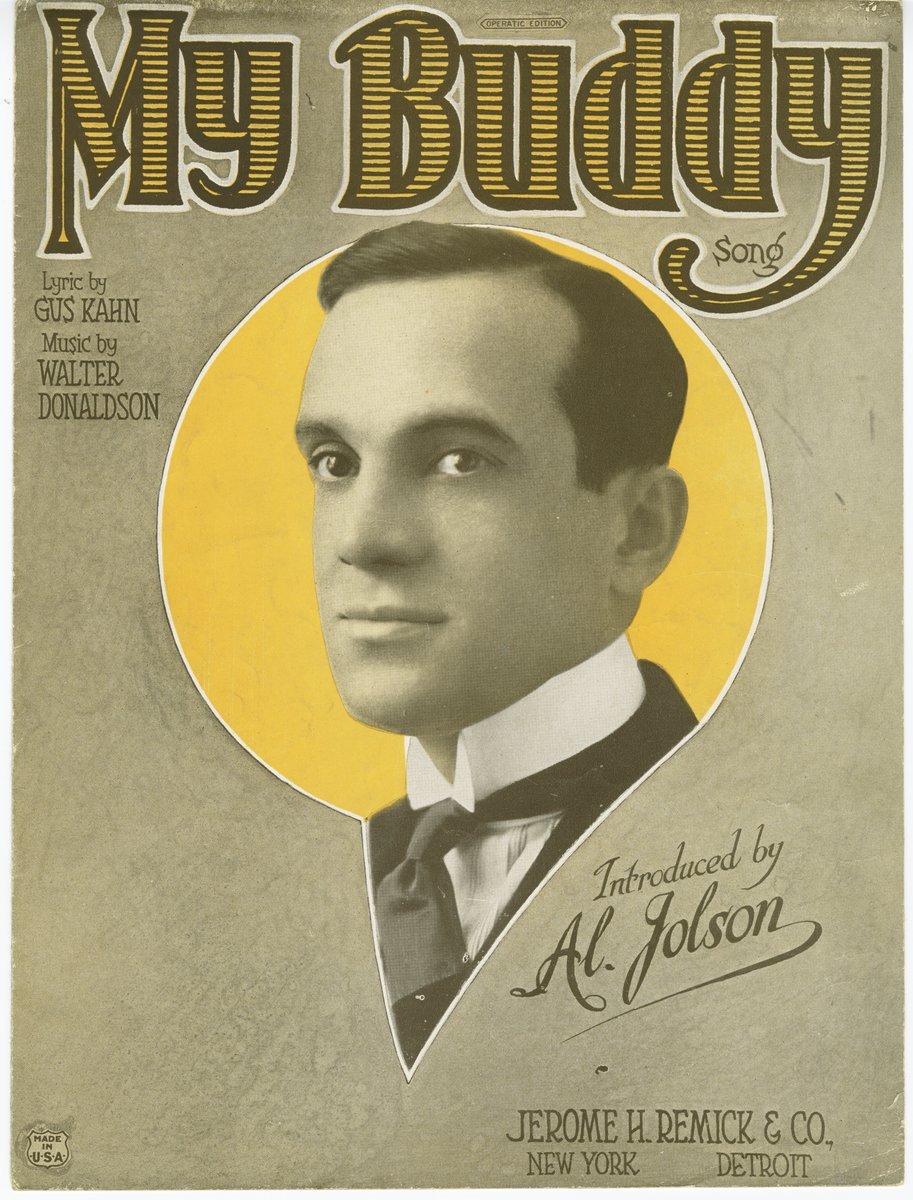
Example of Al Jolson sheet music (1922)

The Catalogue of the U.S. Copyright Records lists Hansen in the category of film scores for the Walt Disney Animation Studios film Bambi (1942). However, this is for the editing of the 1951 song book for music from the film. In that same year, he and Henry M. Katzberg did the compilation and editing for the BMI Television Sketchbook. BMI is the acronym for Broadcast Music, Incorporated, a U.S. performance rights organization. In the following year, he had compiled the music for Al Jolson's Old-Time Minstrel Show. Al Jolson (1886-1950) was a well-known singer, actor, and vaudevillian.

== Discography/Bibliography ==
Songs as Bill Hansen
| Title | Year | Music | Lyrics |
|---|---|---|---|
| Cotton eyed Joe | 1951 | Bill Hansen | |
| I Still Remember You | 1959 | Margaret Smith, LaRue Dickson, and Bill Hansen | Margaret Smith, LaRue Dickson, and Bill Hansen |

Music under the name pseudonym Dale Wood
| Title | Year | Music | Lyrics |
|---|---|---|---|
| Song of the East | 1947 | Dale Wood & Michael Grace | Clay Boland |
| The Bride Wore Blue | 1948 | Leonard Whitcup Sy Lefco Dale Wood | Leonard Whitcup Sy Lefco Dale Wood |
| Pourquoi | 1947 | Michael Grace Carl Tucker Dale Wood | Michael Grace Carl Tucker Dale Wood |
| Chic Charro | 1947 | Elisse Boyd Murray Grand Dale Wood | Elisse Boyd Murray Grand Dale Wood |
| If Love Can Happen | 1947 | Dale Wood & Michael Grace | Clay Boland |
| I've Heard You Say Those Words Before | 1947 | Franklin Wade Clay Boland Dale Wood | Franklin Wade Clay Boland Dale Wood |
| Smile | 1948 | Jack Lathrop & Dale Wood | Jack Lathrop & Dale Wood |
| I Wouldn't Be Surprised | 1948 | Jack Lathrop & Dale Wood | Jack Lathrop & Dale Wood |

Television sketchbooks
| Title | Year | Scriptwriting | Compilation/editing |
|---|---|---|---|
| BMI Television Sketchbook | 1951 | Sketches: Stephen Hunt White & Stephen Falk Krantz | William Lawrence Hansen & Henry M. Katzberg |

Song book editing/compilation as William Lawrence Hansen/Bill Hansen
| Title | Year | Compilation | Editing |
|---|---|---|---|
| 19 Celebrated Baritone Solos | 1950 | William Lawrence Hansen | |
| Songs from the film Bambi | 1951 | | Bill Hanson |
| Old Time Dance Tunes | 1951 | Harry Jarman | Bill Hansen (for piano and violin and for violin only) |
| Al Jolson's Old-Time Minstrel Show | 1952 | William Lawrence Hansen (Compilation: songs and text) | |
