= Syncopation (1929 film) =

1929 film

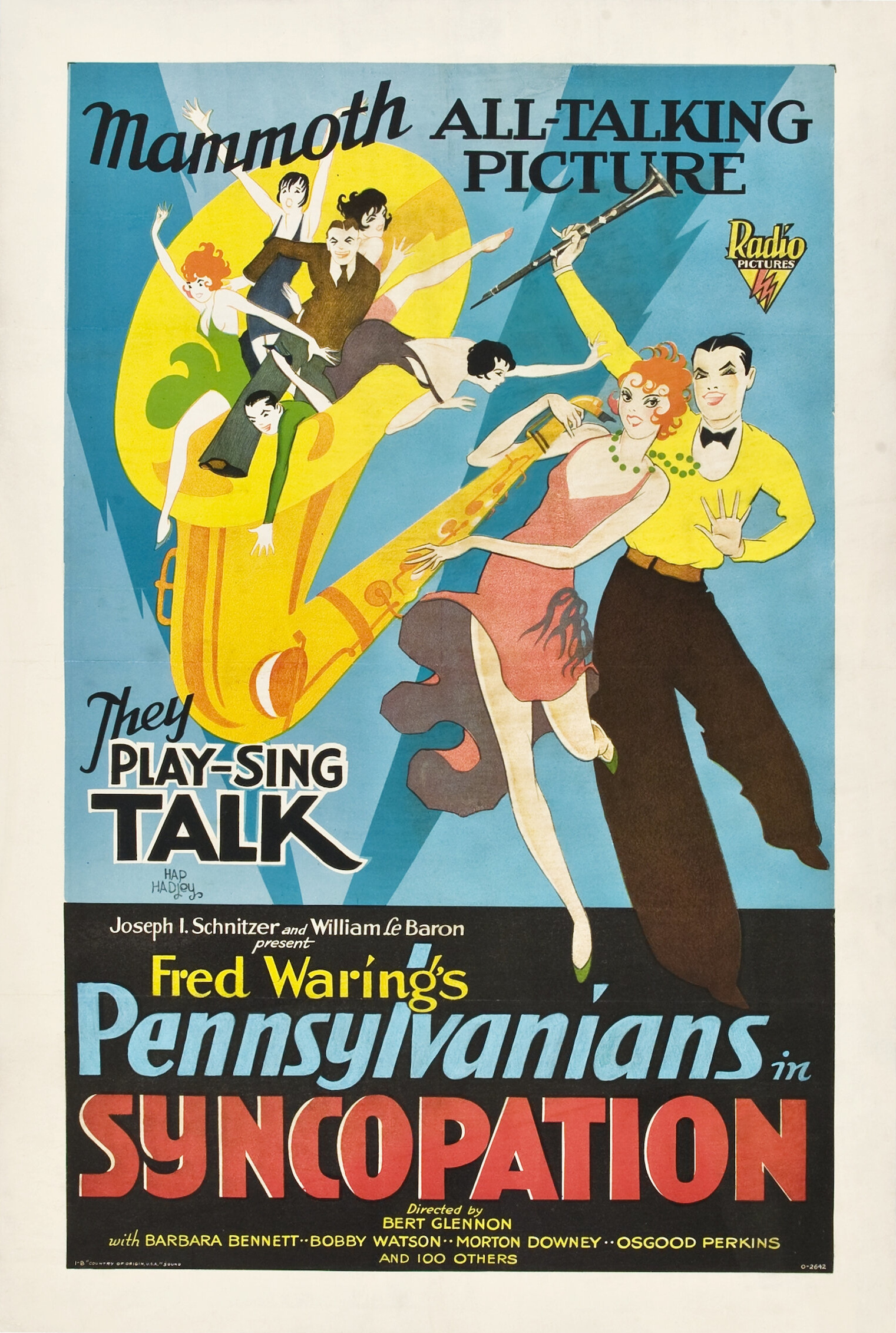
- Theatrical release poster
- Directed by: Bert Glennon
- Written by: Frances Agnew
- Based on: Stepping High by Gene Markey
- Produced by: Robert Kane
- Starring: Fred Waring and the Pennsylvanians; Barbara Bennett; Bobby Watson; Ian Hunter
- Cinematography: Dal Clawson; George Webber; Ian Hunter
- Edited by: Edward Pfitzenmeier
- Music by: Richard Myers; Bud Green; Herman Ruby; Clifford Grey; Sammy Stept; Leo Robin
- Distributed by: RKO Radio Pictures
- Release date: March 24, 1929
- Running time: 83 minutes
- Country: United States
- Language: English
- Box office: $1.2 million

Syncopation is a 1929 American pre-Code musical film directed by Bert Glennon and starring Barbara Bennett, Bobby Watson, and Ian Hunter (although top billing went to Fred Waring and his Pennsylvanians). It was the second film produced by RKO Radio Pictures and the first to be released by the studio, in March 1929; the company's first produced film, Street Girl, was not released until August 21, 1929. The film was made at the company's New York City studios and is based on the novel Stepping High by Gene Markey. The film was heavily marketed on its release, being the first film to be broadcast over the radio, and was a significant success.

This film was the first made in the RCA Photophone sound-on-film process, and was an important test for Radio Corporation of America, which had invested heavily in the newly created RKO.

== Plot ==
The film

Benny and Flo are a husband and wife dance team, traveling around the country as part of a revue. The revue gets picked up and taken to New York City, to be on Broadway. However, it quickly folds, and the two are forced to look for other employment. They eventually find work in a nightclub, becoming famous.

While performing at the nightclub, Flo becomes entranced by a young, sophisticated millionaire playboy, Winston. Swayed by his sweet words, Flo leaves Benny and finds another dancing partner, who she pairs with in another revue, this one financed by Winston. However, her new act is a flop, and when Winston offers to take her to Europe but is unwilling to marry her, she realizes the mistake she's made. She repents and returns to Benny, who takes her back and re-establishes their act, going back on the road.

== Cast ==
- Barbara Bennett as Fleurette ("Flo")
- Bobby Watson as Benny
- Ian Hunter as Winston
- Morton Downey as Lew
- Osgood Perkins as Hummel
- Mackenzie Ward as Henry
- Verree Teasdale as Rita
- Dorothy Lee as Peggy (screen debut)
- Fred Waring and the Pennsylvanians as Themselves. Although they had top billing, Waring and his Pennsylvanians only appeared in two scenes.

== Songs ==
- "Jericho" – Leo Robin, Richard Myers
- "Mine Alone" – Herman Ruby, Richard Myers
- "Do Something" – Bud Green, Sammy Stept
- "I'll Always Be In Love With You" – Herman Ruby, Bud Green & Sammy Stept

== Production ==
Syncopation was shot in New York City. It was originally slated to be titled Stepping High.

== Reception ==
When the film opened at the New York Hippodrome, it had a run of two weeks, during which time it broke the records for that theater for a film.

== See also ==
- List of early sound feature films (1926–1929)
