= When We Reach That Old Port Somewhere in France =

"When We Reach That Old Port Somewhere In France"

Song
- Language: English
- Published: 1917
- Composer(s): Sam H. Stept
- Lyricist(s): Albert Selden

When We Reach That Old Port Somewhere In France is a World War I song written by Albert Selden and composed by Sam H. Stept. The song was first published in 1917 by Stasny Music Co., in New York, NY. The sheet music cover depicts a soldier and a woman embracing with an artillery unit in the background and an inset photo of Anna Chandler.

The sheet music can be found at the Pritzker Military Museum & Library.
