= Sam H. Stept =

American songwriter

Sam H. Stept

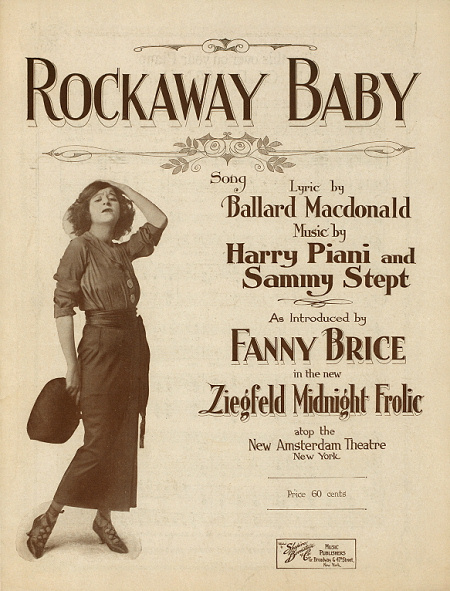
Rockaway Baby sheet music cover with photo of Fanny Brice

Samuel Howard Stept (Note: Stept's World War I Draft Registration Card, shows Howard to be his middle name) (aka Sammy Stept; 18 September 1897 – 1 December 1964) was an American songwriter who wrote for Broadway, Hollywood and the big bands. He became known simply as Sam Stept or Sam H. Stept – he rarely used his full middle name.

== Family ==
Born in Odessa, Russian Empire Stept came to the United States at the age of three and grew up in Pittsburgh. Sam was the son of Solomon (1874–1969,) and Clara Stept (born 1872), who were married around 1895, in Russia. Sam Stept married Jessie E. Stept (née McBride, c. 1901–1967). Jessie was the daughter of George B. McBride and Ada F. McBride of Pittsburgh. Sam also had a daughter (Ada Mae Nye) with Jessie's sister Ruth.

== Career ==
Early in his music career, Stept worked for a local publishing house as staff pianist (song-plugger), then in vaudeville as accompanist to performers that included Anna Chandler, Mae West, and Jack Norworth.

During the early 1920s, Stept lived in Cleveland, Ohio, where he led a dance band. Within the next few years, he began composing with lyricist Bud Green. Their first hit came in 1928 with vocalist Helen Kane's rendition of "That's My Weakness Now," and the duo would collaborate on tunes through the early 1930s.

Stept worked with many other lyricists through his career, including Sidney Mitchell and Ned Washington (while songwriting for Hollywood from the mid-1930s to mid-1940s), Lew Brown, Charles Tobias, and Eddie DeLange.

Some of his popular tunes for the big screen are "Laughing Irish Eyes" for the 1936 film of the same name, "Sweet Hearts" for Hit Parade of 1937 and for the 1942 movie Private Buckaroo, "Don't Sit Under the Apple Tree" and "Johnny Get Your Gun." Stept's output slowed down in the late 1940s, and by the late 1950s, he was concentrating fully on his music-publishing business.

Songs written by Stept have been recorded by many other big names in pop and jazz, including, Sarah Vaughan, Glenn Miller, Fats Waller, Louis Armstrong, as well as by Henry "Red" Allen, Bunny Berigan, Count Basie, Fletcher Henderson, and Josephine Baker.

== Death ==
He died at age 67 in Los Angeles, California.

== Selected songs ==
- "When We Reach That Old Port Somewhere in France"
  Sam. H. Stept (music)
  Al. Selden (words)
  Anna Chandler (performer)
  Strauss Peyton Barbelle (photo) (Illustrator on sheet music)
  A.J. Stasny Music Co., 1917
- "We must Have a Song to Remember"
  Sam H. Stept (music)
  Bud Green (music)
  New York: Al Piantadosi & Co. Inc., 1919
- "And That Ain't All"
  Sam H. Stept (music)
  Bud Green (words)
  New York: Al Piantadosi & Co. Inc., 1919
- "Moonbeams"
  George E. Price (music)
  Sam H. Stept (music)
  Dave Kaplan (arranger)
  New York: Edw. B. Marks Music Co., 1921
- "You'll Change Your Mind," 1923
  Sam Ward (né Samuel Windish; 1892–1960), Andy Hamilton, Sammy Stept (words & music)
- "You"
  Bud L. Cooper (born 1899) (music)
  Al Wohlman (words)
  New York: Irving Berlin, Inc., 1923
- "I Care For Her and She Cares For Me"
  Bud L. Cooper (born 1899) (music)
  Sam H. Stept (words)
  May Singhi Breen (arranger)
  New York: Irving Berlin, Inc., 1925
- "It's a Long Way Down to That Little Old Town"
  Al Bernard, Al (words & music)
  Sam H. Stept (words & music)
  New York: Harold Dixon Music Publisher, 1926
- "Lo-nah"
  Stept, Sam H. Stept (music)
  Bud Green (words)
  New York: Shapiro, Bernstein & Co. Inc., 1926
- "My Sunday Girl," 1927
  Sam H. Stept (music)
  Herman Ruby (né Herman Rubinstein; 1891–1959) (words)
  Bud L. Cooper (born 1899) (words)
- "Good Little Bad Little You," 1928
  Bud Green and Sam H. Stept (words and music)
  Green & Stept Inc. Music Publishers
- "That's My Weakness Now," 1928 (Stept's first hit)
  Bud Green and Sam H. Stept (words and music)
- "I'll Always Be In Love With You"
  Sam H. Stept (music)
  Herman Ruby (né Herman Rubinstein; 1891–1959) (words)
  Bud Green (words)
  Sam H. Stept (words)
  New York: Green & Stept, Inc., 1929
- "For The Like's O' You And Me"
  Bud Green and Sam H. Stept (words and music)
  Green & Stept Inc., 1929
- "When They Sing The Wearin' Of The Green" (In Syncopated Blues)
  Bud Green and Sam H. Stept (words and music)
  Green & Stept Inc., 1929
- "Do Something"
  Sam H. Stept (words & music)
  Bud Green (words & music)
  New York: Green & Stept, Inc., 1929
- "Love Is a Dreamer"
  Bud Green (words & music)
  Sam H. Stept (words & music)
  Green & Stept Inc., 1929
- "World is Yours and Mine"
  Sam H. Stept (music)
  James Frederick Hanley, 1892–1942 (music)
  Bud Green (music)
  Anthony J. Franchini (arranger)
  New York: Shapiro, Bernstein & Co. Inc., 1929
- "I've Got My Eye On You"
  Bud Green & Sam H. Stept (words & music)
  New York: De Sylva, Brown, & Henderson Inc., 1929
- "Tomorrow is Another Day"
  Bud Green, Bud (music & words)
  Sam H. Stept (music & words)
  May Singhi Breen (arranger)
  Music Publishers Holding Corporation, 1930
- "Congratulations"
  Sam H. Stept (music)
  Maceo Pinkard (music)
  Bud Green (words)
  Coleman Goetz (words)
  New York: De Sylva, Brown, & Henderson Inc., 1930
- "Liza Lee" (from the film Big Boy)
  Bud Green
  Sam Stept
  May Singhi Breen (arr.)
  New York: Music Publishers Holding, 1930
- "Please Don't Talk About Me When I'm Gone"
  Sam H. Stept (music)
  Bud Green (Lyrics)
  Sidney Clare (music)
  Bee Palmer (music)
  New York: Remick Music Corp., 1930
- "By a Lazy Country Lane"
  Sam H. Stept (music & words)
  Bud Green (music & words)
  New York: De Sylva, Brown, & Henderson Inc., 1931
- "Who's In Your Arms Tonight?"
  Harry Warren, Bud L Cooper (born 1899), Stept (words & music), 1931
- "And So I Married the Girl"
  Sam H. Stept (music)
  Herb Magidson (words)
  New York: Remick Music Corp., 1932
- "You Can Put It In the Papers"
  Ned Washington (words)
  Sam H. Stept (music)
  New York: Harms Inc., 1934
- "Tiny Little Fingerprints"
  Sam H. Stept (music)
  Charles Tobias (words)
  Charles Newman, 1901–1978 (words)
  New York: Crawford Music Corporation, 1935
- "All My Life"
  Sidney D. Mitchell (words)
  Sam H. Stept (music)
  New York: Sam Fox Pub. Co., 1936
- "Lost In My Dreams"
  Sidney D. Mitchell (words)
  Sam H. Stept (music)
  New York: Sam Fox Pub. Co., 1936
- "Hidden Valley"
  Stept, Sam H. Stept (music)
  Sidney D. Mitchell, 1888–1942 (words)
  Cleveland, OH: Sam Fox Pub. Co., 1936
- "Sweet Heartache"
  Sam H. Stept (music)
  Ned Washington (words)
  New York: Santly Bros.–Joy, Inc., 1937
- "Now You're Talking My Language"
  Ted Koehler & Sidney D. Mitchell (words)
  Sam H. Stept (music)
  New York: Select Music Publications Inc., 1937
- "Chiquita"
  Sam H. Stept (music)
  Oliver Drake (words)
  Jean Walz (arranger)
  Chicago: M.M. Cole Publishing Co., 1939
- "Comes Love"
  Sam H. Stept (composer)
  Lew Brown and Charles Tobias (lyrics)
  1939
- "Came Here To Talk For Joe"
  Lew Brown, Charlie Tobias, Sam H. Stept, 1942
- "Don't Sit Under the Apple Tree"
  Sam H. Stept (music & words)
  Lew Brown (music & words)
  Charles Tobias (music & words)
  New York: Robbins Music Corporation, 1942
- "This is Worth Fighting For" (foxtrot)
  Edgar DeLange (words)
  Sam H. Stept (music)
  New York: Harms Inc., 1942
- "Johnny Get Your Gun"
  Sam H. Stept (music)
  Lew Brown & Charles Tobias (lyrics)
  1943
- "When They Ask About You"
  Sam H. Stept (music & words)
  Bradbury Wood Ltd., 1943
- "It's a Crying Shame"
  Sam H. Stept (music)
  Bob Russell (words)
  New York: Edwin H. Morris & Company, 1944
- "Don't Marry That Girl"
  Al Capp (words)
  Sam H. Stept (music)
  New York: Barton Music Corp., 1946
- "Next Time I Fall in Love"
  Sam H. Stept (words & music)
  Robert Music Corp., 1948
- "The Army's Always There"
  Chosen from 700 "All Army Song Contestants," Stept's song was played at Dwight D. Eisenhower's 1953 Presidential Inauguration, 1953
  Sam H. Stept (music and words)
- "Sing Me a Song of The Islands"
  Words & music: Sam H. Stept & E. DeMauney (née Elizabeth Marshall Mauney; 1912–1995; late widow of Dennis Calvin Blythe; 1908–1989)
  New York: Sherwin Music, Inc. (© 26 May 1953; EU 317770)

== Broadway shows ==
- Shady Lady (1933), co-composer
- Yokel Boy (1939), co-composer and co-lyricist, starring Judy Canova, Buddy Ebsen, and Phil Silvers
- Michael Todd’s Peep Show (1950), Michael Todd
- Music Hall Varieties (1932) and (1933)

== Recordings and performers ==
- Andrews Sisters – "Don't Sit Under the Apple Tree"
- Ernie Andrews – "When They Ask About You"
- The Beatles – "I'll Always Be In Love With You"
- Bob Crosby – "Don't Sit Under the Apple Tree"
- Doris Day – "Please Don't Talk About Me When I'm Gone"
- Morton Downey – "World is Yours and Mine"
- Morton Downey & Dorothy Lee – "Do Something"
- Morton Downey with Fred Waring's Pennsylvanians – "I'll Always Be In Love With You"
- Eddie Fisher – "If It Were Up To Me" (1953)
- Billie Holiday – "My First Impression of You"
- Buck Jones – "Hidden Valley"
- Helen Kane "That's My Weakness Now" (Hit Single) (1928)
- Hal Kemp – "Tiny Little Fingerprints"
- Eartha Kitt – "All My Life" (2006, Café Carlyle, New York)
- Frances Langford – "Sweet Heartache"
- Guy Lombardo – "It's a Crying Shame"
- Jack Norworth – "And That Ain't All"
- Glenn Miller Orchestra – "Don't Sit Under the Apple Tree"
- Leon Redbone – "Please Don't Talk About Me When I'm Gone"
- Nelson Riddle – "Blame it on Paree" (hit single) (1957)
- Frank Sinatra – "Please Don’t Talk About Me When I’m Gone"

== Film, TV, and theater ==
- Applause, directed by Rouben Mamoulian, (song, "That's My Weakness Now") (1929)
- Nothing But the Truth (song, "Do Something") (1929)
- Syncopation (song, "Do Something") (1929)
- Syncopation (song, "I'll Always Be in Love with You") (1929)
- Mother's Boy (song, "The World Is Yours and Mine") (1929)
- Mother's Boy (song, "There'll Be You And I") (1929)
- Lucky in Love (song, "Love is a Dreamer") (1929)
- Lucky in Love (song, "For The Like's O' You And Me") (1929)
- Lucky in Love (song, "When They Sing The Wearin' of the Green") (In Syncopated Blues) (1929)
- Lullaby of Broadway (song, "Please Don't Talk About Me When I'm Gone") (1930)
- Big Boy, with Al Jolson (song, "Liza Lee") (1930)
- Playing Around (song, "You're My Captain Kidd") (1930)
- Playing Around (song, "Playing Around") (1930)
- Playing Around (song, "That's the Lowdown on the Lowdown") (1930)
- Showgirl in Hollywood (song, "I've Got My Eye On You") (1929)
- Showgirl in Hollywood (song, "There's a Tear For Every Smile in Hollywood") (1930)
- Showgirl in Hollywood (song, "Hang Onto a Rainbow") (1930)
- The Naughty Flirt ("Untitled Song") (1931)
- Music Hall Varieties (song, "And So I Married the Girl") (1932)
- The Organ Grinder (song, "Organ Grinder") (1933)
- Buddy's Show Boat (song, "And So I Married the Girl") (1933)
- Baby Take a Bow w/Shirley Temple (song, "On Account-a I Love You") (1934)
- Hop-Along Cassidy (song, "Followin' the Stars") (1935)
- Bar 20 Rides Again (song, "Open Up Your Heart When the Moon Hangs High") (1935)
- The Eagle's Brood (song, "Free with Love") (1935)
- Dancing Feet (title song) (1935)
- Dancing Feet (song, "Everytime I Look At You") (1935)
- Let It Be Me (song, "I've Got My Eye on You") (1936)
- The Phantom Rider (song, "Hidden Valley") (1936)
- Oh, Susanna! (song, "Water Wheel") (uncredited)) (1936)
- The Big Show (song, "Mad About You") (uncredited) (1936)
- The Big Show (song, "Lady Known as Lulu") (uncredited) (1936)
- Red River Valley, w/Gene Autry (song, "Where a Water Wheel Keeps Turning On") (1936)
- Ride Ranger Ride (song, "On the Sunset Trail") (1936)
- Hit the Saddle (song, Winding the Trail) (1937)
- Laughing Irish Eyes (title song from the film) (1936)
- Laughing Irish Eyes (song, "All My Life") (1936)
- Sitting on the Moon (song, "Lost In My Dreams") (1936)
- Happy-Go-Lucky (song, "A Treat for the Eyes") (1936)
- Happy-Go-Lucky (song, ("I'm With You") "Right or Wrong") (1936)
- Hit Parade (song, "Sweet Heartache") (1937)
- Hit Parade (song, "If It Wasn't for Pete") (1937)
- Having a Wonderful Time w/Ginger Rogers and Douglas Fairbanks, Jr. (song, "My First Impression of You") (1937)
- Having a Wonderful Time w/Ginger Rogers and Douglas Fairbanks, Jr. (song, "Nighty Night") (1937)
- Having a Wonderful Time w/Ginger Rogers and Douglas Fairbanks, Jr. (song, "The Band Played Out of Tune") (1937)
- 23 1/2 Hours Leave (song, "Now You're Talking My Language") (1937)
- Night Spot (song, "There's Only One Way to Say 'I Love You") (1938)
- The Women (song, "Please Don't Talk About Me When I'm Gone") (1939)
- That's Right – You're Wrong (song, "The Answer is Love") (1939)
- Hullabaloo (song, "We've Come a Long Way Together") (1940)
- Yokel Boy (song, "Comes Love") (1942)
- Yokel Boy (song, "I Can't Afford to Dream") (1942)
- Yokel Boy (song, "It's Me Again and Time for Jookin") (1942)
- Crash Dive (song, "Don't Sit Under the Apple Tree") (1943)
- Presenting Lily Mars (song, "Don't Sit Under the Apple Tree") (1943)
- The Yankee Doodle Mouse (song, "Johnny, Get Your Gun") (1943)
- Thousands Cheer (song, "Don't Sit Under the Apple Tree") (1943)
- A Guy Named Joe (song, "Don't Sit Under the Apple Tree") (1943))
- Johnny Doughboy (song, "All My Life")
- Syncopation, RKO (song, "Do Something") (1942)
- Syncopation, RKO (song, "I'll Always Be In Love With You") (1929)
- Private Buckaroo (song, "Don't Sit Under The Apple Tree" ("With Anyone Else But Me")) (1942)
- When Johnny Comes Marching Home, (song, "This Is Worth Fighting For") (1940s)
- When Johnny Comes Marching Home, (song, "When They Ask About You") (1940s)
- Happy-Go-Nutty (song, "Don't Sit Under the Apple Tree") (1944)
- Stars on Parade (song, "When They Ask About You," sung by Lynn Merrick) (1944)
- Li'l Abner (song, "Don't Marry That Girl") (1946)
- Holiday In Mexico (song, "Yo Te Amo Mucho") (1946)
- Interrupted Melody (song, "Don't Sit Under the Apple Tree") (uncredited)) (1955)
- One Froggy Evening (song, "Please Don't Talk About Me When I'm Gone") (1955)
- Carol for Another Christmas (TV) (song, "Don't Sit Under the Apple Tree") (1964)
- All My Life (song: "All My Life") (1966)
- The Dirty Dozen (song, "Don't Sit Under The Apple Tree") (uncredited) (1967)
- The Troy Cory Evening Show (song, "That's My Weakness Now"), sung by, father and daughter duo Priscilla Cory and Troy Cory 1974
- Falling in Love Again (song, "Don't Sit Under the Apple Tree") (1980)
- Everyone Says I Love You (song, "All My Life") (1996)
- The Rage: Carrie 2 (song, "Comes Love") (1999)
- The Story of Us (song, "Don't Sit Under The Apple Tree") (1999)
- Chain of Fools (song, "Down to This") (2000)
- Son of the Mask (song, "Please Don't Talk About Me When I'm Gone") (2005)
- The Sopranos (TV) (1 episode, 2006, Members Only, Emmy) (song, "Comes Love") (2006)
- Eurydice, a play by Sarah Ruhl (song, "Don't Sit Under The Apple Tree") (off-Broadway, 2007)
