= Mother's Boy (1929 film) =

1929 film

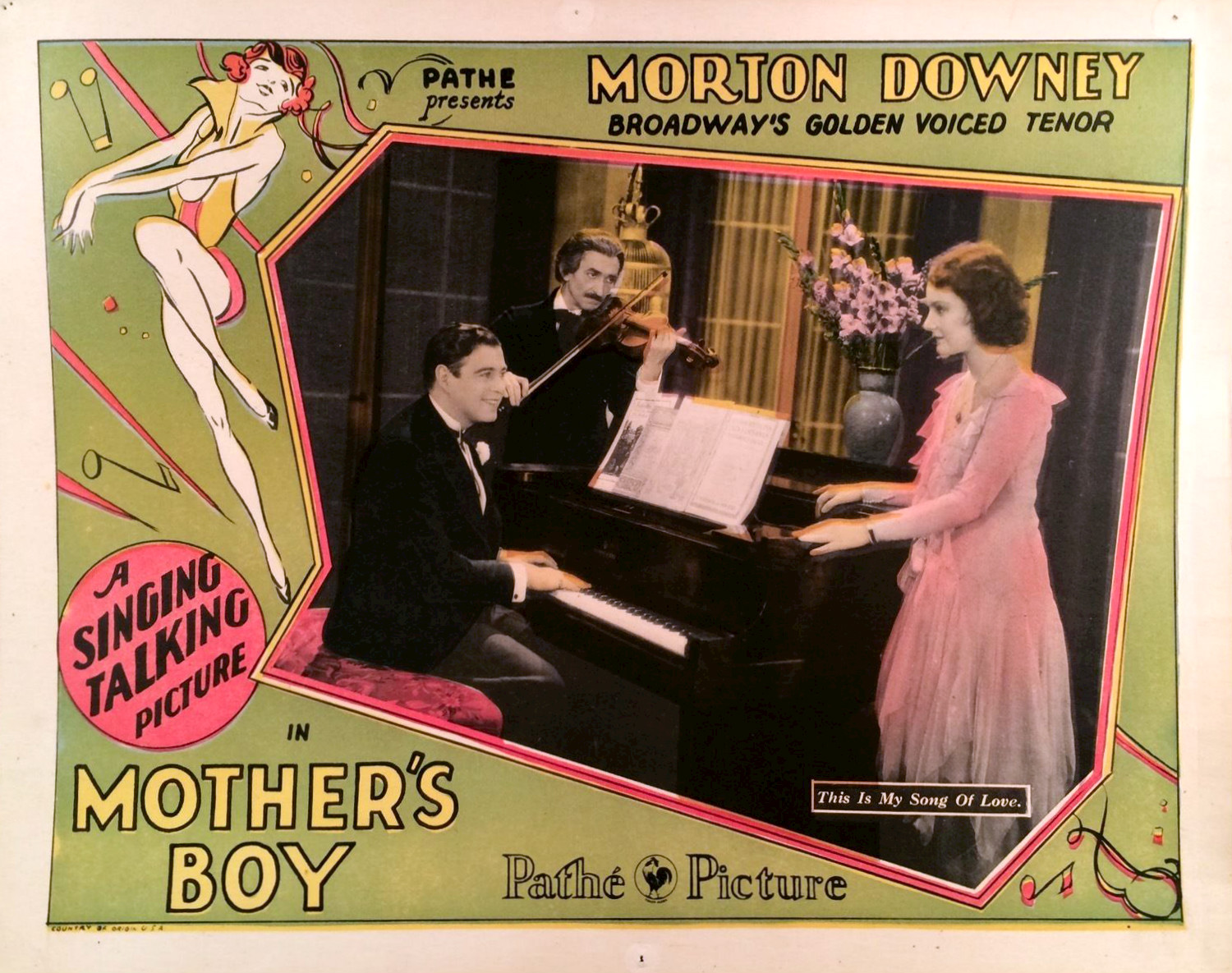
- Lobby card
- Directed by: Bradley Barker
- Written by: Gene Markey (story, screenplay)
- Produced by: Robert Kane
- Starring: Morton Downey; Beryl Mercer; John T. Doyle; Brian Donlevy
- Cinematography: Harry Stradling Sr. Walter Strenge; Philip Tannura
- Edited by: Edward Pfitzenmeier
- Production company: Pathé Exchange
- Distributed by: Pathé Exchange
- Release dates: May 5, 1929 (U.S. premiere); July 1929 (U.S. official)
- Country: United States
- Language: English

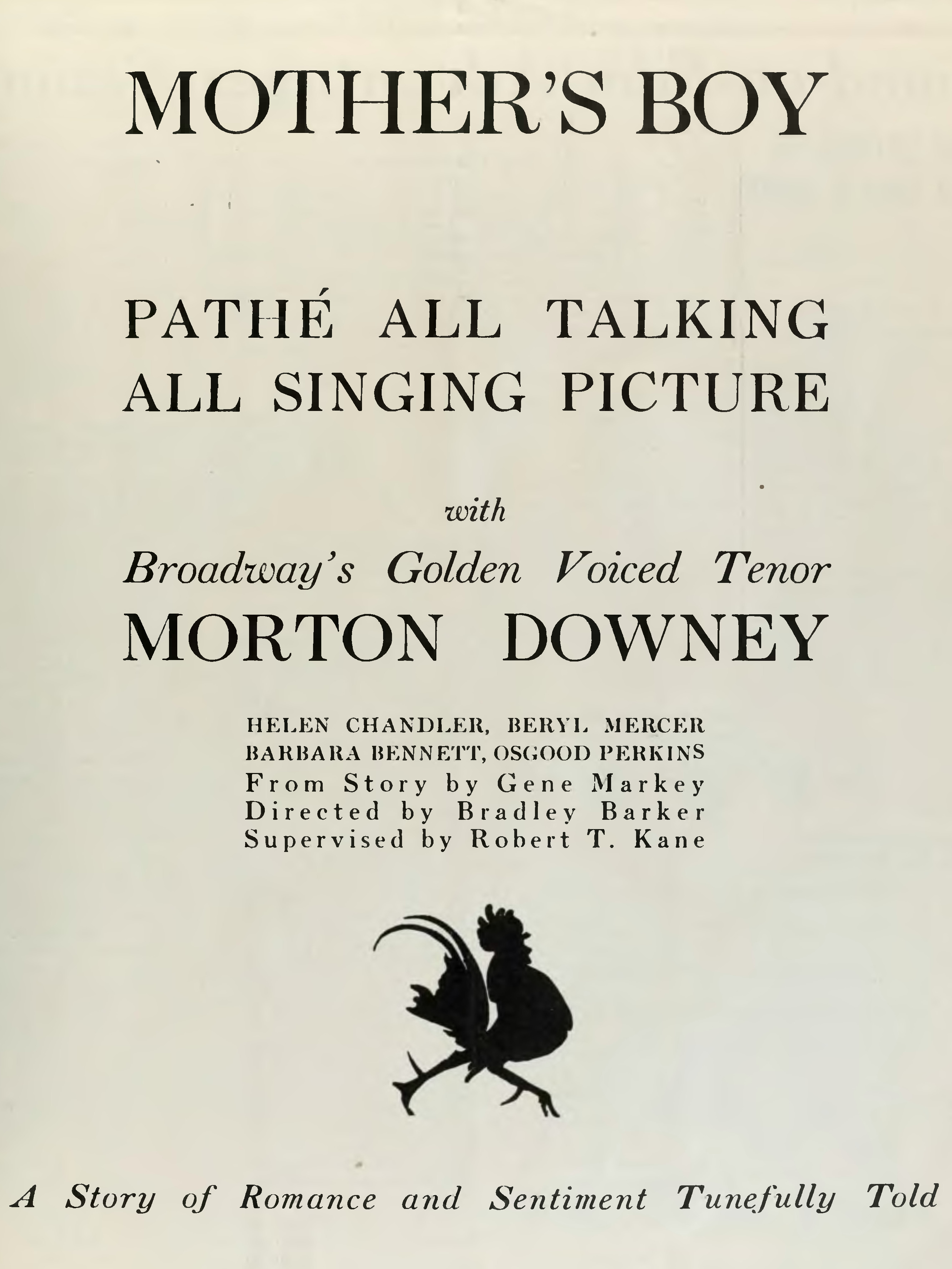
Mother's Boy ad in The Film Daily, 1929

Mother's Boy is a 1929 American black-and-white musical drama film directed by Bradley Barker and starring Morton Downey and Beryl Mercer.

== Plot ==
On the crowded Lower East Side of New York lives Tommy O’Day, a golden-voiced Irish lad who is the pride and joy of his mother, Mrs. O’Day. Tommy works as a delivery boy in a delicatessen, and during his rounds he befriends Jake Sturmberg, an impoverished and half-starved violinist. In exchange for food and kindness, Sturmberg trains Tommy’s remarkable singing voice.

Tommy’s family life is far from peaceful. His rascally brother Harry O’Day steals the family’s meager savings, and suspicion falls unjustly on Tommy. Mr. O’Day, bitter and mistrustful, adds to the boy’s grief. Cast out of his job at the delicatessen, Tommy and Sturmberg seek shelter at a Bowery mission, where they encounter Joe Bush, a once-successful press agent now down on his luck. Recognizing Tommy’s talent, Joe finds him work as a singer in a night club.

In this new world of glitter and shadows, Tommy meets Beatrix Townleigh, a sophisticated society woman who takes an interest in his welfare. With her influence and Joe’s help, Tommy soon rises to greater heights, eventually securing the leading role in a Broadway revue produced by Gus LeGrand. On the eve of his triumph, as the curtain is about to rise, Tommy’s sweetheart Rose Lyndon, a devoted stenographer, arrives with heartbreaking news: his beloved mother lies at death’s door.

Without hesitation, Tommy abandons the show and rushes to his mother’s bedside. There, with a song from his heart, he lifts her back from despair, and she begins to recover. Mrs. O’Day’s health is restored, and the family is reconciled. LeGrand, initially furious at Tommy’s desertion, relents and allows him to return to the revue. Tommy makes his debut, wins renown as a star singer, and secures the love of Rose, the girl who stood by him.

== Cast ==
- Morton Downey as Tommy O'Day
- Beryl Mercer as Mrs. O'Day
- John T. Doyle as Mr. O'Day
- Brian Donlevy as Harry O'Day
- Helen Chandler as Rose Lyndon
- Osgood Perkins as Jake Sturmberg
- Lorin Raker as Joe Bush
- Barbara Bennett as Beatrix Townleigh
- Jennie Moskowitz as Mrs. Apfelbaum
- Jacob Frank as Mr. Apfelbaum
- Louis Sorin as Mr. Bumble
- Robert Gleckler as Gus LeGrand
- Tyrell Davis as Duke of Pomplum
- Allen Vincent as Dinslow
- Leslie Stowe as Evangelist

== Soundtrack ==
- "There'll Be You and I"

Music Sam H. Stept
Lyrics by Bud Green
Copyright 1929 Green & Stept Inc.

- "Come to Me"

Music Sam H. Stept
Lyrics by Bud Green

- "I'll Always Be Mother's Boy"

Music Sam H. Stept
Lyrics by Bud Green

- "The World Is Yours and Mine"

Music Sam H. Stept
Lyrics by Bud Green

== See also ==
- List of early sound feature films (1926–1929)
