= Almost Married (1942 film) =

1942 film by Charles Lamont

- Directed by: Charles Lamont
- Starring: Jane Frazee
- Production company: Universal Pictures
- Distributed by: Universal Pictures
- Release date: May 22, 1942
- Running time: 65 minutes
- Country: United States
- Language: English

Almost Married is a 1942 American comedy musical film directed by Charles Lamont and starring Jane Frazee.

== Cast ==
- Jane Frazee as Gloria Dobson
- Robert Paige as James Manning, lll
- Eugene Pallette as Doctor Dobson
- Elizabeth Patterson as Aunt Matilda Manning
- Charles Coleman as Michael, Manning's Butler
- Maude Eburne as Mrs. Clayton
- Olin Howland as Bright
- William A. Lee as Hurley
- Mary Forbes as Mrs. Marvin
- Lionel Pape (in his last film role) as Mr. Marvin
- Slim Gaillard and Slam Stewart as themselves (Slim and Slam)
