= Bud Green =

Austrian-American songwriter

- Born: Moses David Green; 19 November 1898; Austro-Hungarian Empire
- Died: 2 January 1981 (aged 82); Yonkers, New York, United States
- Occupation: Lyricist
- Relatives: Bob Russell (brother-in-Law)

Bud Green (19 November 1897 – 2 January 1981) was an American lyricist especially of Broadway musicals and show tunes

== Early life and family ==
Green was born Moses David Green in the Austro-Hungarian Empire and immigrated to the United States as an infant. Bud Green (Buddy) grew up in Harlem at 108th & Madison Avenue at the turn of the 20th century, the eldest of seven. He dropped out of elementary school to sell newspapers and help the family.

While selling papers, he decided to become a songwriter and started keeping a notebook of poems and rhymes that he thought would be useful someday. His sister, Hannah, was married to the lyricist Bob Russell (1914–1970), who wrote "Brazil", "Frenesi", "Don't Get Around Much Anymore", "He Ain't Heavy, He's My Brother", and many other songs.

== Career ==
In his early career, he wrote material for vaudevilles. He was a staff writer for music publishers and wrote Broadway stage scores as well as songs for other musicals.

By 1928, he had written "Alabamy Bound" and "That's My Weakness Now", which became a hit for Ukulele Ike and Helen Kane. Kane's version including the suggestive scat phrase "boop boop ba doo." This line and Kane's stage persona made the song synonymous with the flapper era. Kane and the song became the inspiration for the Betty Boop cartoons that debuted in 1930. The song was self-published by Green and Sam H. Stept. They were in the Brass Rail Building at 745, 7th Avenue. They then went to Hollywood to work for the movie industry. He and Stept eventually sold their company to Warner Bros. and returned to New York.

He collaborated with many artists and fellow songwriters, including Les Brown, Buddy DeSylva, Al Dubin, Ella Fitzgerald, Slim Gaillard, Ray Henderson, Ben Homer, Raymond Scott, Sam H. Stept, and Harry Warren.

== Personal life ==
At 21, Bud Green married a girl from the Ziegfeld Follies, Nan Hinken, they were together until her death in the early 1960s. After selling his company, Green moved his family to Yonkers, New York, where he lived the rest of his life. They had two sons, both now deceased.

== Death and legacy ==
Green died in Yonkers, New York on January 2, 1981 at the age of 82.

== Songs ==
Bud Green wrote or co-wrote a number of songs, including:

- "Alabamy Bound" (Dean Martin on Swingin' Down Yonder, 1955; Bing Crosby on New Tricks, 1957; Ray Charles on The Genius Hits the Road, 1960; Van Morrison on The Skiffle Sessions - Live in Belfast 1998, 2000)
- "That's My Weakness Now" (Helen Kane, 1928)
- "I Love My Baby" (Ottilie Patterson, 1957)
- "Oh Boy, What a Girl"
- "In My Gondola"
- "Away Down South in Heaven"
- "I'll Always Be In Love With You" (Ella Fitzgerald on Rhythm Is My Business, 1962;)
- "Do Something"
- "Congratulations"
- "Good Little, Bad Little You"
- "My Mother's Evening Prayer"
- "Simple and Sweet"
- "Dream Sweetheart"
- "Moonlight on the River"
- "Swingy Little Thingy"
- "Blue Fedora"
- "More Than Ever"
- "You Showed Me the Way" (Ella Fitzgerald; Billie Holiday; Tony Bennett on Here's to the Ladies, 1995)
- "Tia Juana"
- "Once in a While"
- "The Man Who Comes Around"
- "Flat Foot Floogie (with a Floy Floy)" (Mills Brothers and Louis Armstrong; Slam Stewart, 1938)
- "Sentimental Journey" (Doris Day and Les Brown's band, 1944)
- "Speed Limit"
- "Who Can Tell"
- "All the Days of Our Years"
- "My Number One Dream Came True" (Doris Day, 1946)
- "On Account I Love You"

== Awards ==
He was inducted into the Songwriters Hall of Fame in 1975.
