= I'll Always Be in Love with You =

"I'll Always Be In Love With You"
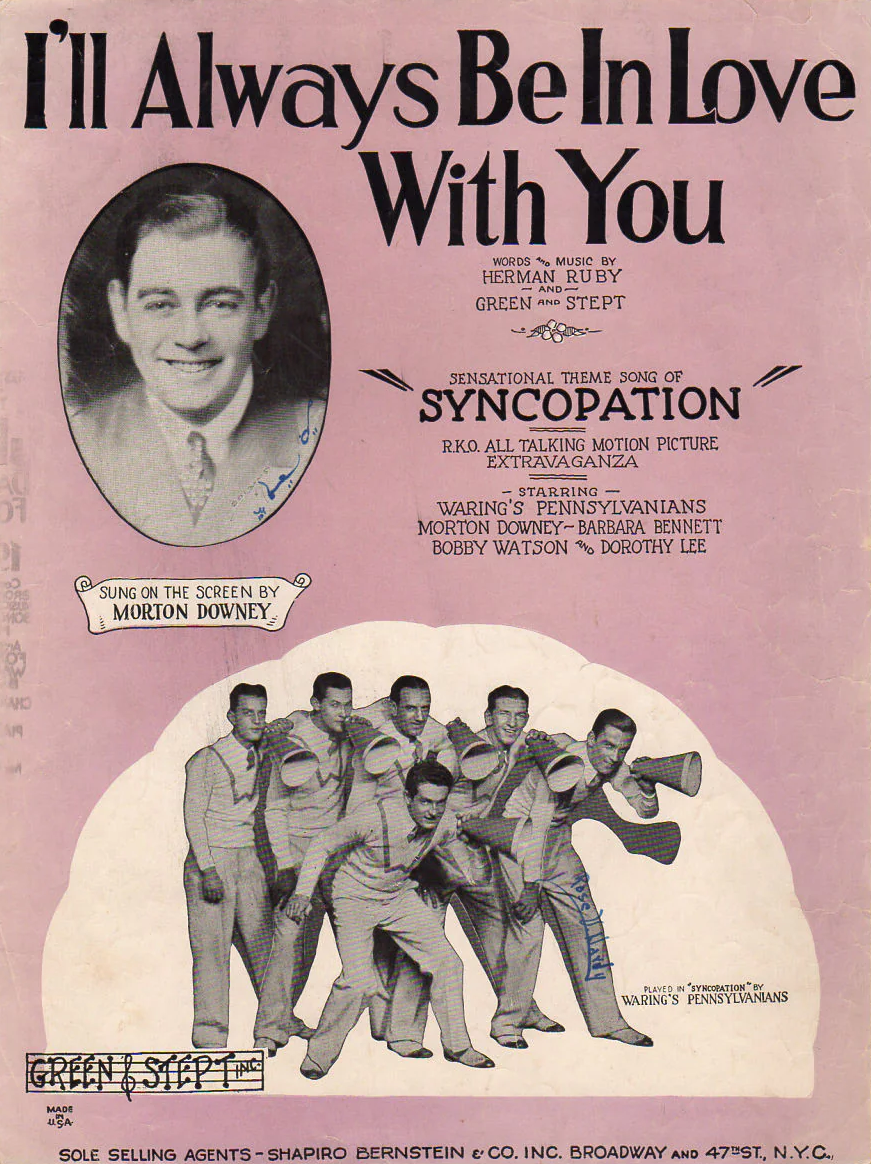
- Sheet music cover, 1929

Single by Fred Waring and His Pennsylvanians
- A-side: "Jericho"
- Published: 1929 by Green & Stept, Inc.
- Released: 1929
- Genre: Traditional pop
- Length: 2:58
- Label: Victor 21870
- Songwriters: Herman Ruby, Bud Green, and Sam H. Stept

"I'll Always Be In Love With You" is a 1929 popular song written by Herman Ruby, Bud Green, and Sam H. Stept for the film Syncopation. The song soon became a hit, with a recording in that year by Fred Waring and His Pennsylvanians charting for 8 weeks, peaking at No. 3. Another recording from that year by Morton Downey charted as well, reaching No. 9. The song has since been recorded many times by artists including Ella Fitzgerald, Benny Goodman, Della Reese, Count Basie, Helen Forrest, Fletcher Henderson, Dinah Shore, and Kay Starr.
