= Dreaming of My Indiana Sweetheart =

"(Dreaming of My) Indiana Sweetheart" is a waltz that was composed by composer Bill Hansen and actress and dancer Barbara Bennett. It was copyrighted in 1931 and published by Phil Kornheiser Inc. of New York. They were two U.S. copyrights which are the following:

The two copyrights for Dreaming of My Indiana Sweetheart
Date of copyright	Authors	Arrangement
February 9, 1931	Barbara Bennett and Bill Hansen	Words and melody
February 24, 1931	Bill Hansen	Ukulele

== Performances ==
Musical artists in 1931 releases
Performer	Arrangement
Rudy Vallée	Jack Mason
Morton Downey	

Note: Performer Morton Downey was the husband of Barbara Bennett, one of the song's composers, as this time.

== Gallery ==
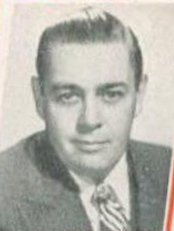
Morton Downey was one of the performers for the song in 1931.

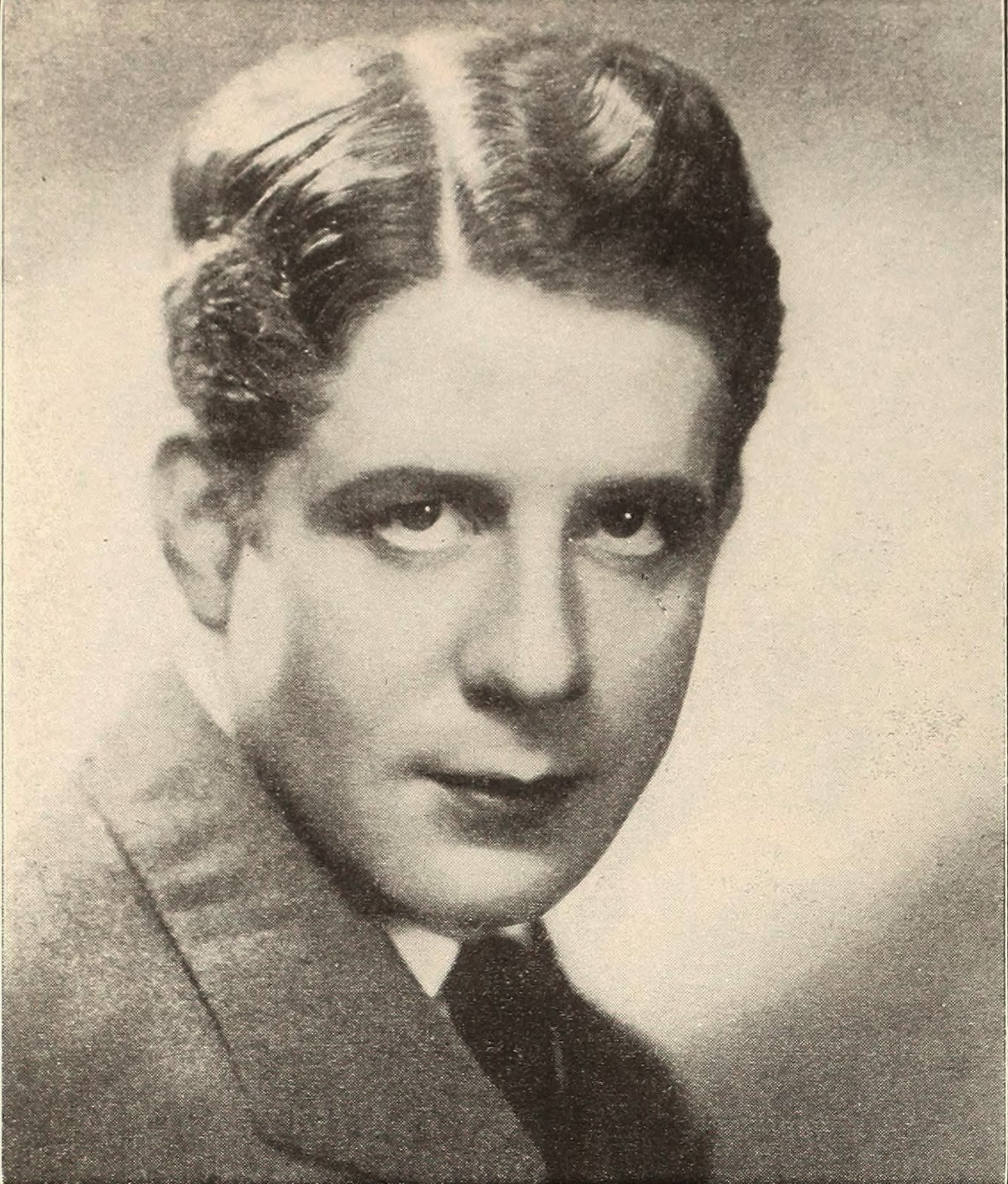
Rudy Vallee was one of the performers of the song in 1931.
