= That's My Weakness Now =

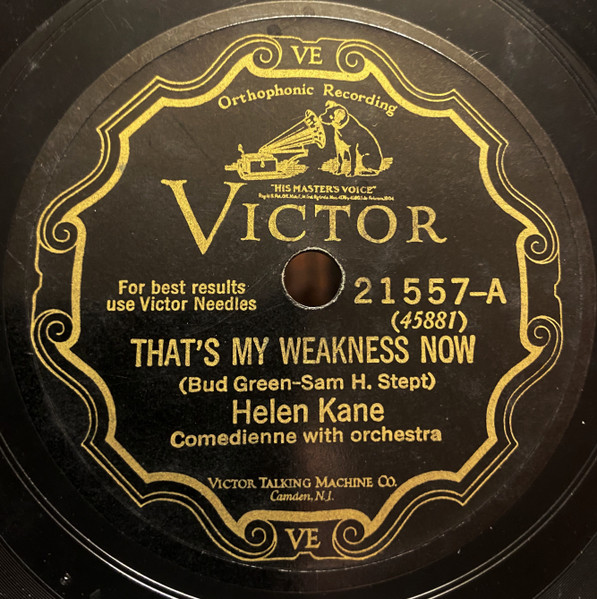

Single by Helen Kane
- B-side: "Get Out And Get Under The Moon"
- Released: 1928
- Genre: Traditional pop
- Length: 3:34
- Label: Victor
- Songwriters: Sam H. Stept and Bud Green

Alternative cover
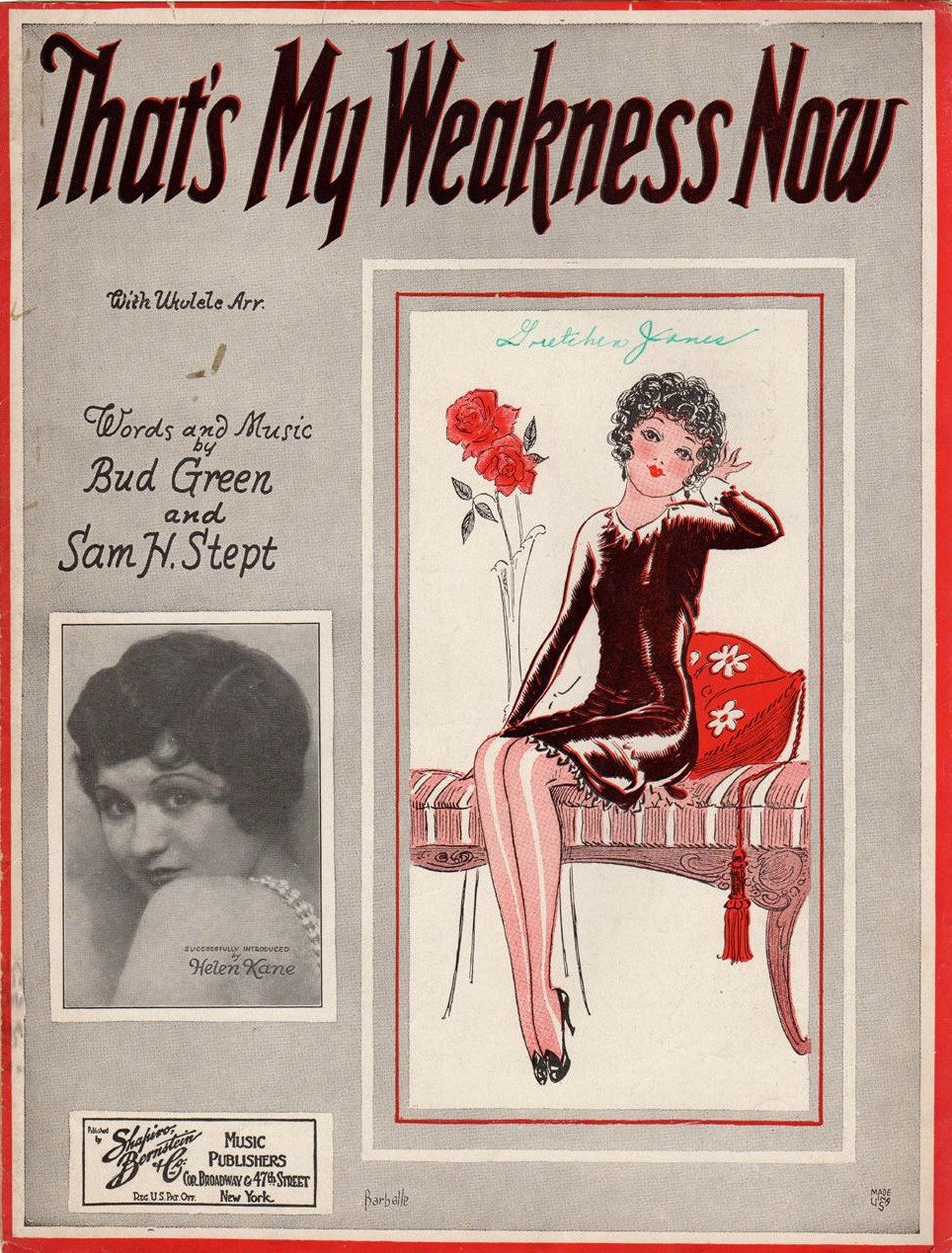
- 1928 sheet music cover with Helen Kane

"That's My Weakness Now" is a song written by Sam H. Stept and Bud Green (words and music) in 1928. This became their first hit song together, having been made popular by singer Helen Kane that same year. Another recording in 1928 was by Paul Whiteman and his Orchestra, supported by a vocal group including Bing Crosby.

It is used as the opening theme in the Vitaphone music and sound effects disc for the silent Laurel and Hardy short We Faw Down in 1928 and the same recording of the song is used to open the 1929 Laurel and Hardy talkie shorts Perfect Day and The Hoose-Gow. It is also featured in the 1932 Krazy Kat cartoon Piano Mover and the Betty Boop cartoon Stopping the Show from the same year.

The song is about being in love with someone so much that they start to like things their lovers like that they previously never cared for.

Russ Morgan had a hit with the song in 1949 reaching the No. 17 spot in the Billboard charts.
