= Barbara Bennett =

American actress and dancer (1906–1958)

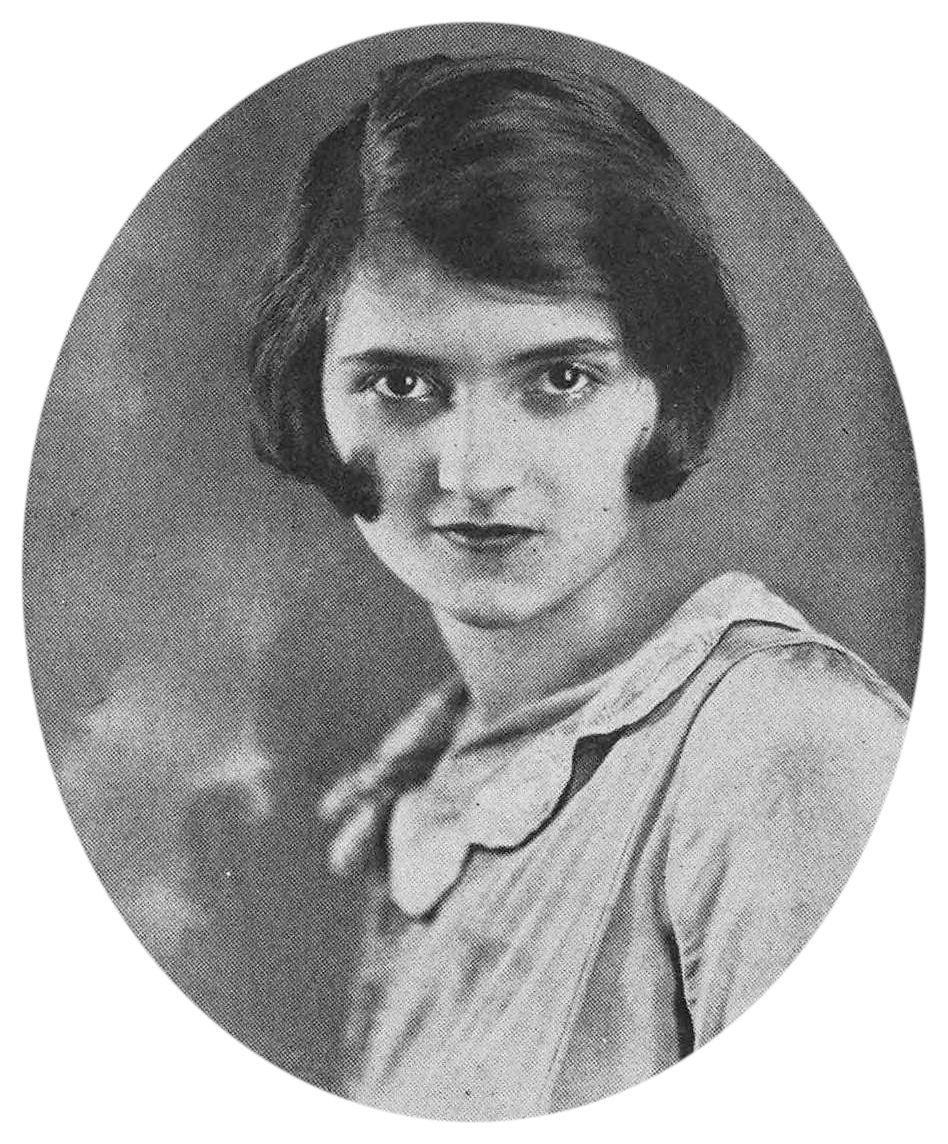
- Bennett in 1924
- Born: Barbara Jane Bennett; August 13, 1906; Palisades Park, New Jersey, U.S.
- Died: August 8, 1958 (aged 51); Montréal, Québec, Canada
- Resting place: Burtonville Cemetery, Lacolle, Quebec
- Other name: Barbara Bennett Suprenant
- Occupations: Actress, dancer
- Spouses: Morton Downey (m. 1929; div. 1941) Jack Randall (m. 1941; died 1945) Laurent Surprenant (m. 1954)
- Children: 5, including Morton Downey Jr.
- Parent(s): Richard Bennett; Adrienne Morrison
- Relatives: Constance Bennett (sister); Joan Bennett (sister); Lewis Morrison (maternal grandfather)

Barbara Jane Bennett (August 13, 1906 – August 8, 1958) was an American stage and film actress and dancer.

== Family ==
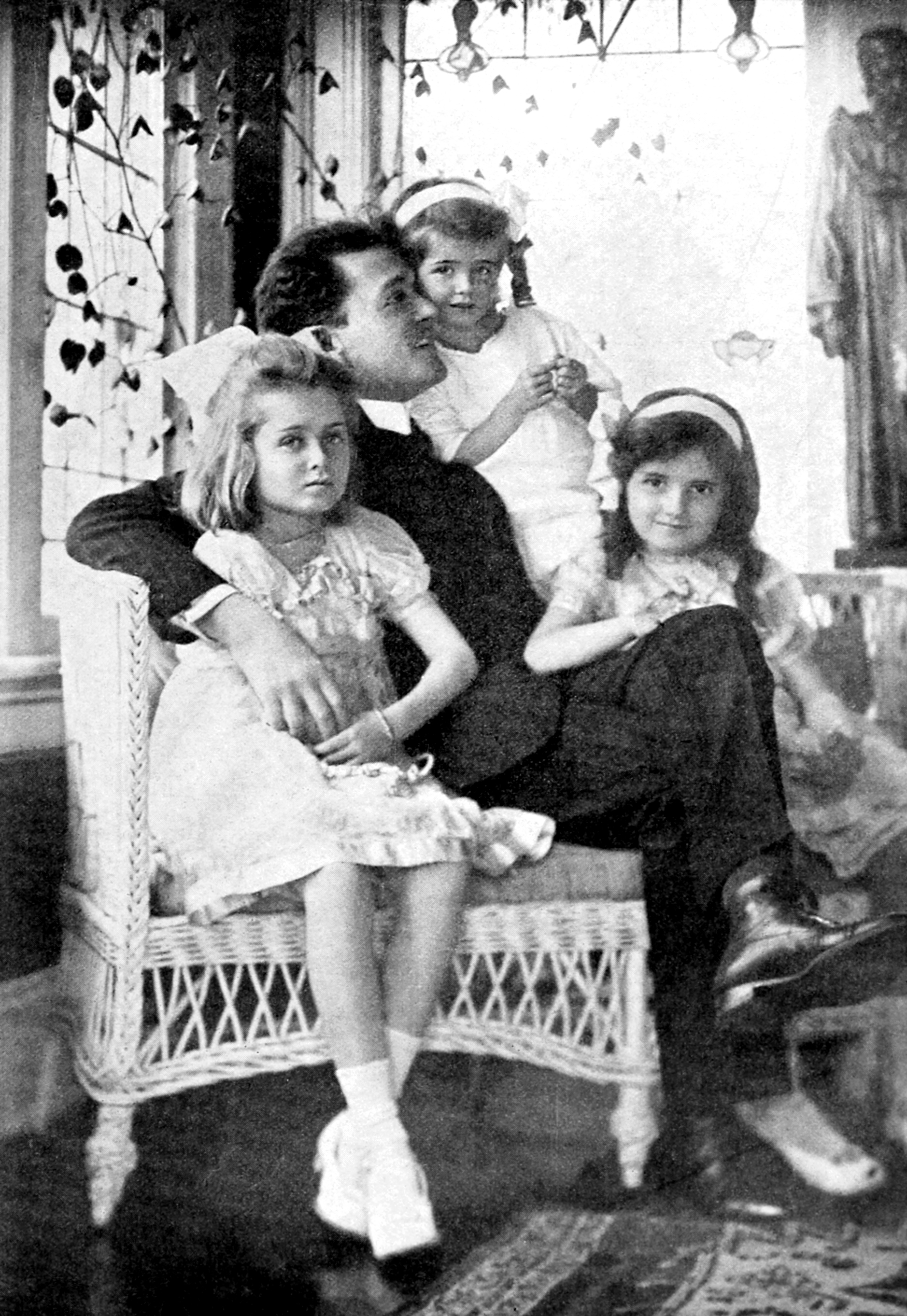
Richard Bennett with his three daughters (from left), Constance, Joan and Barbara (ca. 1913)

Born in Palisades Park, New Jersey, Barbara Bennett was the second of three daughters born to actor Richard Bennett and his wife, actress Adrienne Morrison. Her maternal grandfather was the stage actor Lewis Morrison. Her older sister Constance and her younger sister Joan had successful film careers. The girls attended the Chapin School with the actress Jane Wyatt.

== Personal life ==
Bennett married three times and had five children. On January 28, 1929, she married tenor Morton Downey. The couple had four biological children, including son Morton Downey Jr., and adopted a fifth child, Michael. They divorced in June 1941. Bennett later married actor Jack Randall, a popular romantic star and singing cowboy at the time. On July 16, 1945, Randall died after suffering a myocardial infarction and falling from a horse during the filming of The Royal Mounted Rides Again. Bennett married Laurent Surprenant in 1954. The couple moved to Montreal in 1957 and remained together until her death the following year.

== Career ==
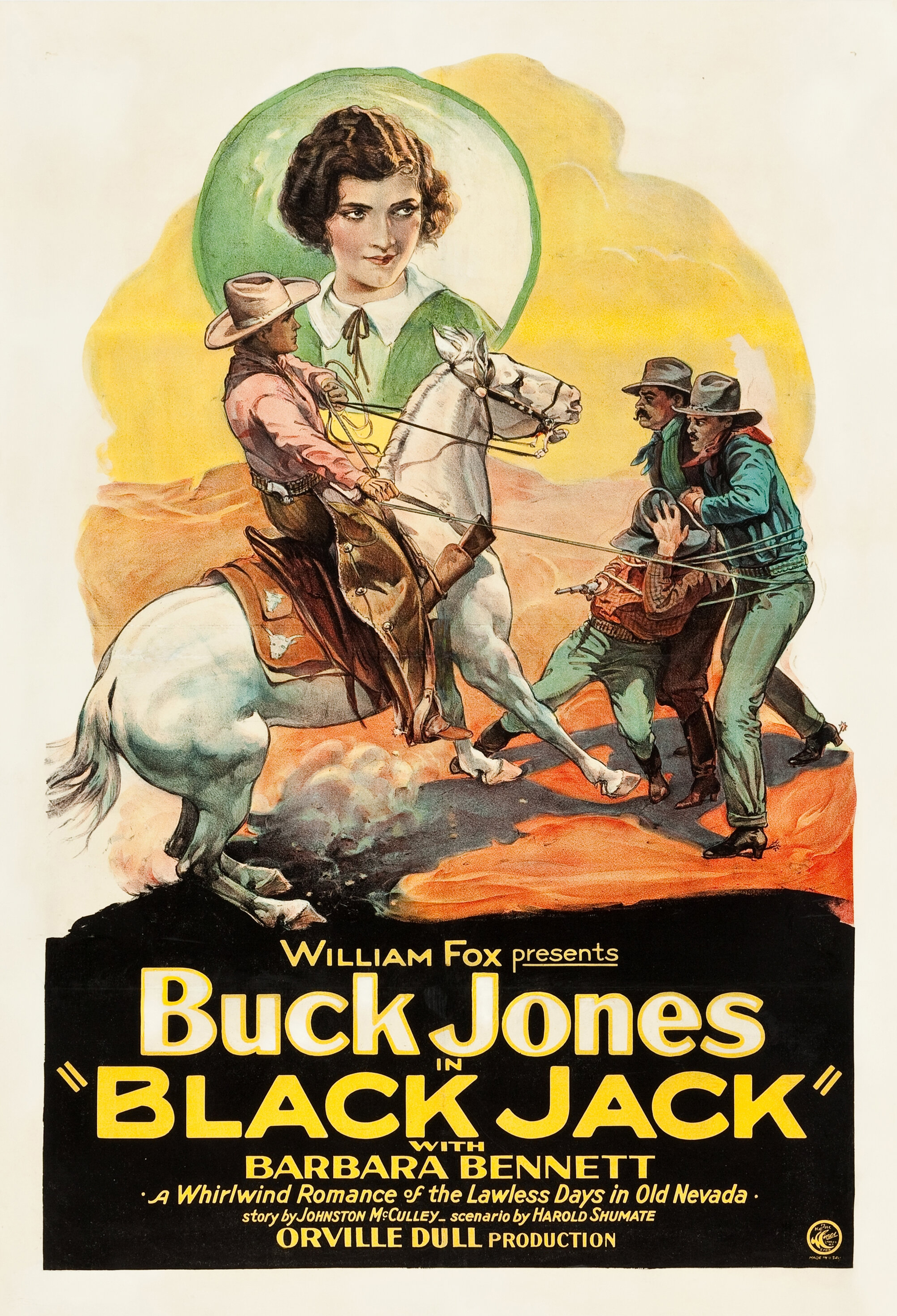
Bennett is featured on the poster for Black Jack, a 1927 Fox Film Corporation release.

Bennett was an actress on Broadway as well as a film actress (1916-1930). In 1931, she co-authored the waltz Dreaming of My Indiana Sweetheart with Bill Hansen.

Bennett later worked as a literary representative for producer Walter Wanger, who was married to her sister Joan. In that position, Bennett scouted best-sellers and the like as potential movie properties, especially for her sister Joan.

== Death ==
On August 8, 1958, five days before her 52nd birthday, Bennett died after what the media described as an unidentified "long illness" in Montreal. Over the course of her life, Bennett attempted suicide four times. As the circumstances surrounding herself were vague and Bennett's sister Joan refused to discuss the details of her death, rumors arose that Bennett had finally succeeded in ending her life.

In her 1982 memoirs Lulu in Hollywood, longtime friend and actress Louise Brooks wrote of Bennett, "Barbara made a career of her emotions. Periods of work or marriage were terminated by her frightening, abandoned laughter of despair and failure. Only her death, in 1958, achieved in her fifth suicide attempt, could be termed a success."

She was buried at Burtonville cemetery in Lacolle, Quebec. A memorial service was later held at the Church of the Good Shepherd in Beverly Hills.

== Broadway credits ==
Production	Role	Date
The Stork	Heloise	January 26 – February 1925
Victory Belles	Miss Flo Hilliard	October 26, 1943 – January 22, 1944

== Filmography ==
Year	Title	Role	Notes
1916	The Valley of Decision	Unborn soul	
1927	Black Jack	Nancy Blake	
1929	Syncopation	Fleurette Sloane	
1929	Mother's Boy	Beatrix Townleigh	
1930	Love Among the Millionaires	Virginia Hamilton	
