= Waring's Pennsylvanians =

American dance band

Waring's Pennsylvanians was a dance band founded at Penn State University by Fred Waring.

First named the Collegians, the group was formed in 1918 at Penn State by the brothers Fred and Tom Waring and their friends Freddy Buck and Poley McClintock. They had a hit in 1925 with the song "Collegiate". Other popular novelty songs were "I've Never Seen a Straight Banana" and "I Wonder How I Look When I'm Asleep".

The Pennsylvanians performing in Syncopation.

In 1929 they appeared in the movie Syncopation and on stage in The New Yorkers the following year. Their popularity increased in the 1930s with their presence in radio and movies. During the 1940s, they performed on Broadway and at the World's Fair and became the first band to broadcast its own TV show. From 1950 to 1970, they became a corporation that branched into workshops, real estate, and a magazine.
