= Madame Racketeer =

1932 film

- Directed by: Harry Wagstaff Gribble; Alexander Hall
- Written by: Malcolm Stuart Boylan; Harvey Gates
- Produced by: Harry Wagstaff Gribble
- Starring: Alison Skipworth; Richard Bennett; George Raft
- Cinematography: Henry Sharp
- Music by: John Leipold
- Production company: Paramount Pictures
- Distributed by: Paramount Pictures
- Release date: July 23, 1932
- Running time: 72 minutes
- Country: United States
- Language: English

Madame Racketeer is a 1932 American pre-Code comedy film featuring Alison Skipworth, Richard Bennett and George Raft. The movie was directed by Harry Wagstaff Gribble and Alexander Hall. It was produced and distributed by Paramount Pictures.

== Cast ==
- Alison Skipworth as Countess/Martha Hicks
- Richard Bennett as Elmer Hicks
- George Raft as Jack Houston
- John Breeden as David Butterworth
- Evalyn Knapp as Alice Hicks
- Gertrude Messinger as Patsy Hicks
- Robert McWade as James Butterworth
- J. Farrell MacDonald as John Adams
- Jessie Arnold as Frankie
- Anna Chandler as Stella
- Oscar Apfel as J. Harrington Hagneya
- Arthur Hoyt as Shiffem
- Irving Bacon as Gus, Desk Clerk
- George Barbier as Warden George Waddell
- Frank Beal as Appleby, Bank Director
- Robert Homans as Chief of Police
- Winter Hall as Minister
- Ed Brady as Taxi Driver

== Production ==
The film was based on an original screenplay based on the life of a real woman. It was sold under the title The Countess of Auburn. This was changed to The Sporting Widow then Madame Racketeer. In March 1932 Paramount announced Alison Skipworth would star.

In April 1932 Irving Cummings signed to direct. George Raft was cast later that month. Raft had recently signed a long-term contract with Paramount off the back of his strength of his work in Scarface but that film had not gone into wide release yet.

Numerous retakes were done after the film was completed.

The movie was one of 23 films put into receivership by Paramount in January 1933.

== Reception ==
The New York Times said "part of it is funny, part of it is amusing enough and some of it is a little on the sadward side."
