= Black Jack (1927 film) =

1927 film

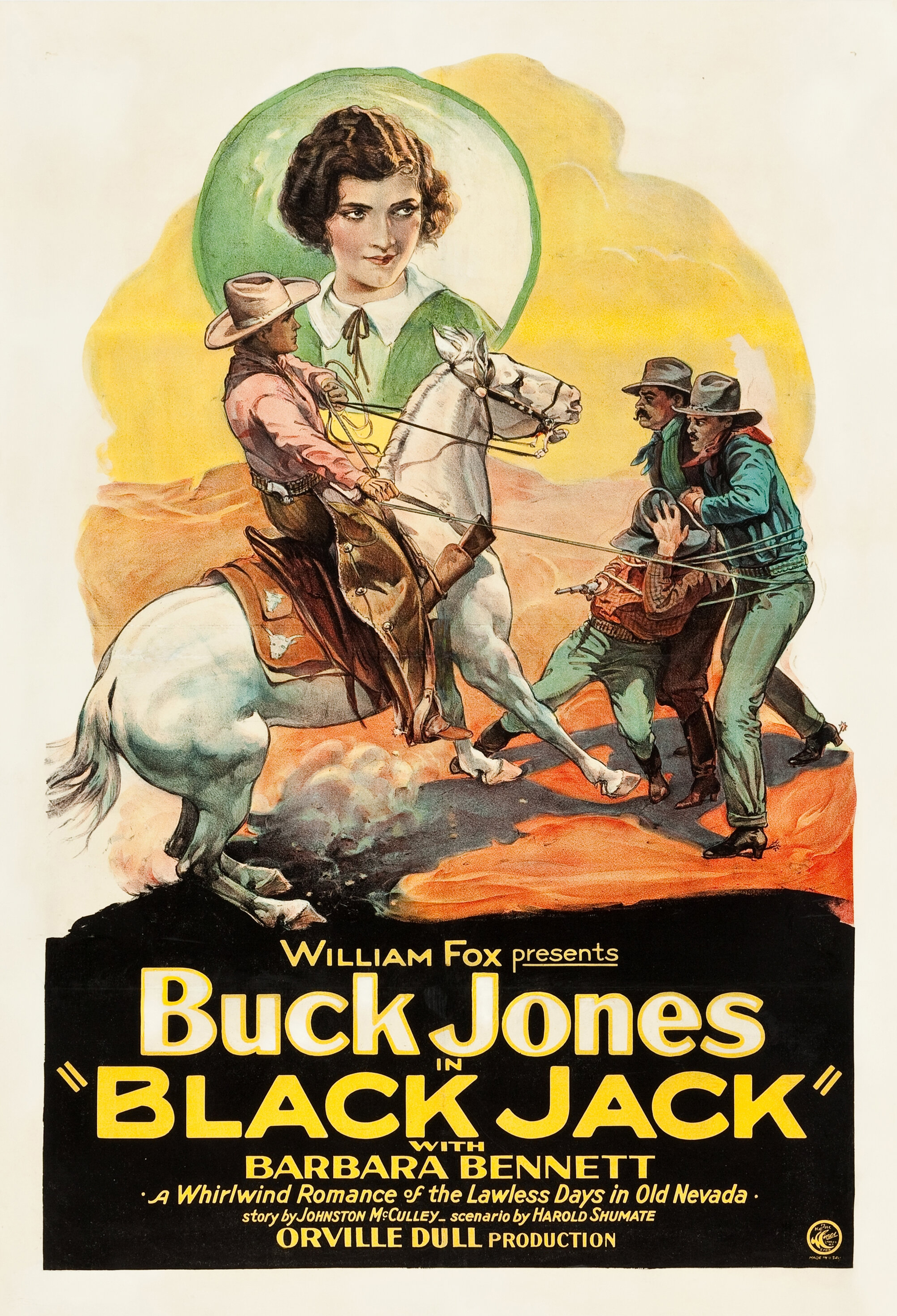
- Theatrical release poster
- Directed by: Orville O. Dull
- Screenplay by: Harold Shumate
- Produced by: Orville O. Dull
- Starring: Buck Jones; Barbara Bennett; Theodore Lorch; George Berrell; Harry Cording; William Caress
- Cinematography: Reginald Lyons
- Production company: Fox Film Corporation
- Distributed by: Fox Film Corporation
- Release date: September 25, 1927
- Running time: 50 minutes
- Country: United States
- Languages: Silent; English intertitles

Black Jack is a lost 1927 American silent Western film directed by Orville O. Dull and written by Harold Shumate. The film stars Buck Jones, Barbara Bennett, Theodore Lorch, George Berrell, Harry Cording and William Caress. The film was released on September 25, 1927, by Fox Film Corporation.

== Cast ==
- Buck Jones as Phil Dolan
- Barbara Bennett as Nancy Blake
- Theodore Lorch as Sam Vonner
- George Berrell as Judge
- Harry Cording as Haskins
- William Caress as First Deputy
- Buck Moulton as Second Deputy
- Murdock MacQuarrie as Holbrook
- Frank Lanning as Kentuck
- Mark Hamilton as Slim
- Sam Allen as Ed Holbrook

== Preservation status ==
- The film is currently a lost film.
