= Ray Perry =

American jazz violinist and saxophonist (1915–1950)

- Born: February 25, 1915
- Origin: United States
- Died: 1950 (aged 34–35)
- Genres: Jazz
- Occupation(s): Violinist, saxophonist
- Instrument(s): Violin, saxophone

Ray Perry (February 25, 1915 – 1950) was an American jazz violinist and saxophonist.

Perry was born in 1915 to a musical family and began playing the violin at a young age, while his brothers Joe and Bay became a baritonist and drummer, respectively. Perry sang during his violin solos, inspiring Slam Stewart to continue the practice on bass. He performed more frequently on alto saxophone.

He worked bread and butter gigs with the best in the business, including Dean Earl (1935), Clarence Carter (1937–39, not the R&B singer), Blanche Calloway (1940), and Lionel Hampton (1940–43). Despite his short career, Ray Perry worked with many jazz artists, including:

- Shadow Wilson
- Illinois Jacquet (1946–47, 1950)
- Vernon Alley
- J. C. Heard (1946)
- Joe Newman
- Fred Beckett
- Sabby Lewis (1948)
- Sir Charles Thompson
- Irving Ashby

Many of his records failed to gain a wide following, but he was very successful until poor health prevented him from touring. Two of Perry's albums remain popular - Jumpin' Jacquet and 50 Sublimes Chanteurs de Jazz. Some of his more famous songs are Flyin' Home, How High the Moon, Love is the Thing, Boog It, and I Want a Little Girl.
