= Flat Foot Floogie (with a Floy Floy) =

1938 jazz song by Slim Gaillard

"Flat Foot Floogie (With a Floy Floy)"

Single by Slim & Slam
- B-side: "Chinatown, My Chinatown"
- Released: February 17, 1938
- Recorded: New York City
- Genre: Swing; Novelty
- Label: Vocalion
- Songwriters: Slim Gaillard; Slam Stewart; Bud Green

"Flat Foot Floogie (with a Floy Floy)", also known as "Flat Fleet Floogee", is a 1938 jazz song written by Slim Gaillard, Slam Stewart, and Bud Green, and performed by Gaillard and Stewart as Slim & Slam.

"Flat Foot Floogie" was Slim & Slam's first and biggest hit song. Their version was one of the top records of 1938, peaking at number 2 on US charts.

== History ==
Bulee "Slim" Gaillard (1911–1991) and Leroy "Slam" Stewart (1914–1987) met in New York City in 1936 and formed a duo, performing together on the radio and in 52nd Street clubs, with Gaillard on guitar and vocals and Stewart on bass. They attracted radio pioneer Martin Block to manage them and he arranged a contract with Vocalion. On February 17, 1938, Slim and Slam recorded "Flat Foot Floogie" (Vocalion 4021).

Gaillard sold the publishing rights to "Flat Foot Floogie" to Green Brothers and Knight for $250 (equivalent to $5,585 in 2024), and writing credit was shared with Bud Green. (Note: According to an account by Gaillard, the $250 was an advance against royalties, but Stewart reported that the duo made little money from the sheet music and that he collected back residuals only after joining ASCAP.) Shortly thereafter, Benny Goodman & His Orchestra performed it on the Camel Caravan radio show, launching its rise to popularity.

Slim & Slam's record peaked at number 2 on the Billboard charts and at number 5 on Your Hit Parade. (Note: Goodman also charted with the song in 1938, peaking at number 7.)

== Lyrics ==
The lyrics are brief and are dominated by the repetition of the title words and the nonsense refrain, "floy-doy, floy-doy, floy-doy". The original lyric, recorded in January 1938, was "flat foot floozie with a floy floy". However, Vocalion objected to the word "floozie", meaning a sexually promiscuous woman or a prostitute. The second recording in February changed the word to "floogie". The second part of the title phrase, "floy floy", was slang for a venereal disease, but the term was not widely known and failed to attract the attention of censors. It was regarded as nonsense and came to have positive connotations as a consequence of the song.

== Other versions ==
Many artists covered the song in 1938: Wingy Manone on May 23; Nat Gonella; Benny Goodman & His Orchestra on May 31 (Victor 25871); Louis Armstrong with The Mills Brothers on June 10 (Decca 1876); as well as Woody Herman and Count Basie. In Europe, Fats Waller recorded it in London while on tour (His Master's Voice BD5399), an instrumental version was recorded by jazz guitarist Django Reinhardt (Decca F-6776), and the Dutch singing duo Johnny & Jones covered it.

Gaillard recorded "Flat Foot Floogie" again in 1945 for Bel-Tone, with an ensemble that included Charlie Parker, Dizzy Gillespie, and Jack McVea, one of several songs recorded during the session. Bel-Tone went bankrupt, but the recordings were acquired by Majestic and released in 1946. (Note: "Dizzy Boogie"/"Flat Foot Floogie", Slim Gaillard Orchestra (Majestic 9002).)

The song has continued to be revisited over the years. The Jacksons performed it twice on their 1970s variety show, the Ukulele Orchestra of Great Britain has included it in performances, and Nina Hagen covered it on her 2006 album Irgendwo auf der Welt.

Keb' Mo' covered the song on the album Big Wide Grin.

== In other media ==
The title for the 1938 The Three Stooges film, Flat Foot Stooges, is a play on the song's title. In the following year's Three Stooges short film, Three Sappy People, Curly tells Moe and Larry that he is "flat as a floogie", meaning he was broke.

The Goodman version of the song is heard in the 1993 film, Swing Kids.

It was one of three pieces of music included in the 1938 Westinghouse Time Capsule, along with Finlandia by Jean Sibelius and "The Stars and Stripes Forever" by John Philip Sousa.

Bill Holman's comic strip Smokey Stover contained a reference to the song in its November 26, 1938, edition: "It sounds like flat foot Flanagan with the foo foo." Here, "flat foot" is slang for a police officer; Flanagan is reporting that an arsonist has escaped by burning down the jail.
