= Sam Allen (musician) =

American jazz pianist

- Born: January 30, 1909 Middleport, Ohio, U.S.
- Died: April 1963 (aged 54) California, U.S.
- Genres: Jazz
- Instruments: Piano

Sam Allen (January 30, 1909 – April 1963) was an American jazz pianist.

== Early life ==
Allen was born in Middleport, Ohio. Beginning at the age of 10, he accompanied silent films on piano in movie theaters.

== Career ==
In 1928, Allen moved to New York City, where he joined Herbert Cowans's band at the Rockland Palace. Before long, he moved back to Ohio, where he played with saxophonist Alex Jackson in 1930. He joined James P. Johnson's orchestra as the second pianist and then was a member of the Teddy Hill band. In the 1940s he worked with Stuff Smith, Dizzy Gillespie, and became pianist for Slim & Slam.

== Discography ==
With Dizzy Gillespie

- The Complete RCA Victor Recordings (Bluebird, 1995)
