= Stopping the Show =

1932 film

- Directed by: Dave Fleischer
- Produced by: Max Fleischer
- Starring: Mae Questel (uncredited); Gus Wickie
- Music by: Sammy Timberg
- Animation by: Roland Crandall; Rudolph Eggeman; Al Eugster (uncredited)
- Color process: Black-and-white
- Production company: Fleischer Studios
- Distributed by: Paramount Pictures
- Release date: August 12, 1932
- Running time: 8 minutes
- Country: United States
- Language: English

Stopping the Show is a 1932 Fleischer Studios animated short, directed by Dave Fleischer. While it is not the first appearance of Betty Boop, it is the first short to be credited as "A Betty Boop Cartoon".

== Synopsis ==
Betty Boop appears on stage in a vaudeville theater. Her act consists of imitations of real-life singers, including Helen Kane, Fanny Brice and Maurice Chevalier. The cartoon audience enthusiastically cheers and applauds.

== Notes and comments ==
- When the short was originally released, it contained a scene showing Betty singing Helen Kane's song "That's My Weakness Now". Kane, who was involved in a lawsuit over Betty's resemblance to her, complained, and the studios were forced to remove the scene from future prints.
- Clips from this short were later reused in 1934's Betty Boop's Rise to Fame.
