= Piano Mover =

1932 film

- Screenshot; Krazy Kat (left), the spaniel (right)
- Directed by: Ben Harrison
- Produced by: Charles Mintz
- Music by: Joe DeNat
- Animation by: Allen Rose
- Color process: Black and white
- Production company: Charles Mintz Studio
- Distributed by: Columbia Pictures
- Release date: January 4, 1932
- Running time: 6:27
- Language: English

Piano Mover is a 1932 short animated cartoon released by Columbia Pictures, starring Krazy Kat.

== Plot ==
Krazy Kat and a co-worker are delivering a piano to one of the highest floors of an enormously tall condominium. Unable to fit the piano through the building's tiny doors, their only option is to lift it through a window with a crane. Krazy Kat must stand on the piano while it is lifted, forcing him to deal with his fear of heights as well as hostile residents protesting their delivery method.

Krazy Kat and the piano finally reach the destination, where he discovers that the recipient of the piano is his girlfriend, an unnamed spaniel. She celebrates by playing the still-dangling piano and singing the song "That's My Weakness Now". Krazy Kat and his girlfriend dance on the balcony but forget where they are, and they fall off the balcony. They catch themselves on the piano's legs, eventually managing to get on top of it, but now have to ride it safely to the ground. On the way down, a bird bites through the rope and the piano and its riders crash to the ground. The piano is destroyed and Krazy Kat and his girlfriend are dazed but unhurt.

== Availability ==
The Krazy Kat shorts from the Columbia era were released for television by Samba Productions and Screen Gems. Home videos were distributed by Excel Home Movies, Official Films, and Columbia Home Movies. The cartoon Piano Mover is available in the Columbia Cartoon Collection: Volume 2.

== See also ==
- Krazy Kat filmography
