= Slim & Slam =

American jazz duo

Slim Gaillard (behind) and Slam Stewart

Slim & Slam was a musical partnership in the late 1930s and early 1940s consisting of Bulee "Slim" Gaillard (vocals, guitar, vibes and piano) and Leroy Elliott "Slam" Stewart (bass and vocals). They produced novelty jazz numbers featuring Slim's distinctive vocal style with vocalese and scats, hipster argot and nonce words. Sam Allen played piano and Pompey "Gus" Dobson played drums on most of their early recordings.

Their biggest hit was "Flat Foot Floogie (with a Floy Floy)".

Other musicians who recorded with Slim & Slam included Charlie Parker, Ben Webster, Jimmy Rowles, Kenny Clarke, Al Killian, Chico Hamilton, Leo Watson and Garvin Bushel.

The song "Tutti Frutti" by Little Richard is loosely based on Slim & Slam's 1938 "Tutti Frutti" (Vocalion 4225).
