= Slim Gaillard =

American jazz singer-songwriter and musician (1911–1991)

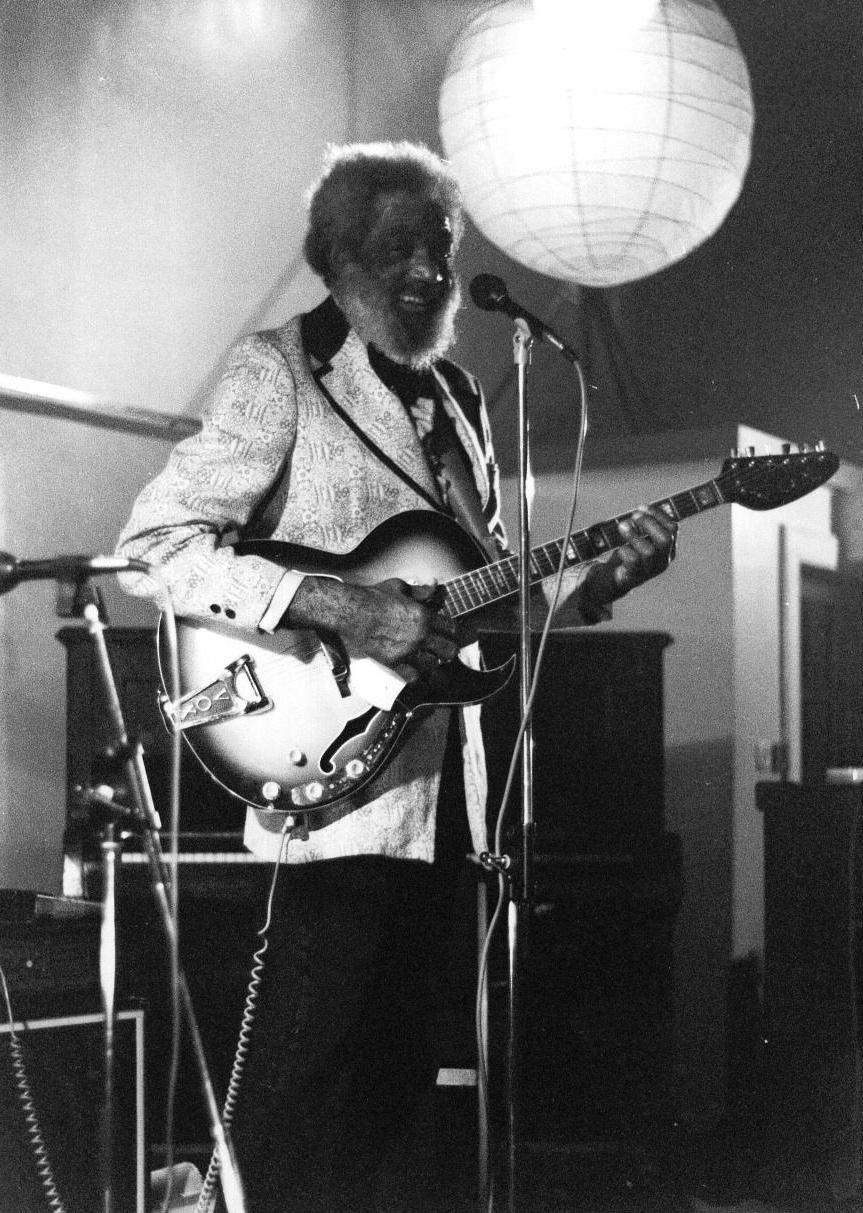
- Gaillard with guitar at the Queen's Hall, Edinburgh, Scotland, 1982

Background information
- Born: Bulee Gaillard; January 9, 1911 (Note: Birth date of January 9, 1911, is per the Social Security Death Index; other records vary, see discussion in section "Early life".)
- Died: February 26, 1991 (aged 80) London, England
- Genre: Jazz
- Occupations: Musician, songwriter
- Instruments: Vocals, guitar, piano, vibraphone, tenor saxophone
- Years active: 1930s–1989
- Labels: Savoy, Dial, Verve
- Formerly of: Slim & Slam

Bulee "Slim" Gaillard (January 9, 1911 – February 26, 1991), also known as McVouty, was an American jazz singer and songwriter who played piano, guitar, vibraphone, and tenor saxophone. Gaillard was noted for his comedic vocalese singing and word play in his own constructed language called "Vout-o-Reenee", for which he wrote a dictionary.

In addition to English, he spoke five languages (Spanish, German, Greek, Arabic, and Armenian) with varying degrees of fluency.

He rose to prominence in the late 1930s with hits such as "Flat Foot Floogie (with a Floy Floy)" and "Cement Mixer (Put-Ti-Put-Ti)" after forming Slim and Slam with Leroy Eliot "Slam" Stewart. During World War II, Gaillard served in the U.S. Army Air Forces. In 1944, he resumed his music career and performed with such notable jazz musicians as Charlie Parker, Dizzy Gillespie, and Dodo Marmarosa.

In the 1960s and 1970s, he acted in films—sometimes as himself—and also appeared in bit parts in television series such as Roots: The Next Generations. Gaillard resumed touring the circuit of European jazz festivals during the 1980s.

== Early life ==
Along with Gaillard's birthdate, his lineage and place of birth are disputed. Many sources state that he was born in Detroit, Michigan, though Gaillard said himself that he was born in Santa Clara, Cuba, of an Afro-Cuban mother called Maria (Mary Gaillard) and a German-Jewish father called Theophilus (Theophilus Rothschild) who worked as a ship's steward.

During an interview in 1989, Gaillard added: "They all think I was born in Detroit because that was the first place I got into when I got to America." However, the 1920 census lists one "Beuler Gillard" [sic] as living in Pensacola, Florida, having been born in April 1918 in Alabama. Researchers Bob Eagle and Eric LeBlanc have concluded that Gaillard was probably born in June 1918 in Claiborne, Alabama, where a "Theophilus Rothchild" [sic] had been raised the son of a successful merchant in the small town of Burnt Corn; other documents give his name as Wilson, Bulee, or Beuler Gillard or Gaillard. Several documents from the federal government of the United States give an earlier birth year: Gaillard's draft registration card—dated October 14, 1940, and signed by him—lists his birth date as January 4, 1911, in Pensacola, Florida; his World War II enlistment record with the U.S. Army also lists his birth year as 1911; and his entry in the Social Security Death Index gives his date of birth as January 9, 1911.

At age 12, Gaillard accompanied his father on a world voyage and was accidentally left behind on the island of Crete. On a television documentary in 1989, he said, "When I was stranded in Crete, I was only 12 years old. I stayed there for four years. I traveled on the boats to Beirut and Syria and I learned to speak the language and the people's way of life." After learning a few words of Greek, he worked on the island "making shoes and hats". He then joined a ship working the eastern Mediterranean ports, mainly Beirut, where he picked up some knowledge of Arabic.

When Gaillard was about 15, he re-crossed the Atlantic, hoping the ship would take him home to Cuba, but it was bound for the U.S. and he ended up in Detroit. He never saw either of his parents again. Alone and unable to speak English, he tried to get a job at Ford Motor Company but was rejected because of his age. Gaillard worked at a general store owned by an Armenian family, with whom he lived for some time, then tried to become a boxer. During Prohibition, in 1931 or 1932, he drove a hearse with a coffin that was packed with whiskey for the Purple Gang.

Gaillard attended evening classes in music and taught himself to play guitar and piano. When Duke Ellington came to Detroit, Gaillard went backstage and met his hero. Determined to become a musical entertainer, he moved to New York City and entered the world of show business as a "professional amateur". As Gaillard recalled much later: "The MC would say, 'Here they come, all the hopefuls!' Well, we may have been hopefuls but we weren't amateurs. Of course, you had to be a little bad in spots. If you were too good you'd lose the amateur image. I would be a tap dancer this week, next week I'd play guitar, two weeks later some boogie-woogie piano. They paid us $16 a show. I did one with Frank Sinatra, I got $16 and he got $16. Every time I see him I say, 'Got a raise yet, Frank?'"

== Career ==
Gaillard first rose to prominence in the late 1930s as part of Slim & Slam, a jazz novelty act he formed with bassist Slam Stewart. Their hits included "Flat Foot Floogie (with a Floy Floy)" and "Cement Mixer (Put-Ti-Put-Ti)". The duo performs in the 1941 movie Hellzapoppin'.

Gaillard's appeal was similar to Cab Calloway's and Louis Jordan's in that he presented a hip style with broad appeal (e.g. in his children's song "Down by the Station"). Unlike Calloway and Jordan, however, he was a master improviser whose stream of consciousness vocals ranged far from the original lyrics. He sang wild interpolations of nonsense syllables, such as "MacVoutie O-Reeney". One such performance is celebrated in the 1957 novel On the Road by Jack Kerouac. Gaillard, with Dodo Marmarosa on piano, appeared as a guest several times on Command Performance, recorded at KNX radio studios in Hollywood in the 1940s and distributed on transcription discs to American troops during World War II.

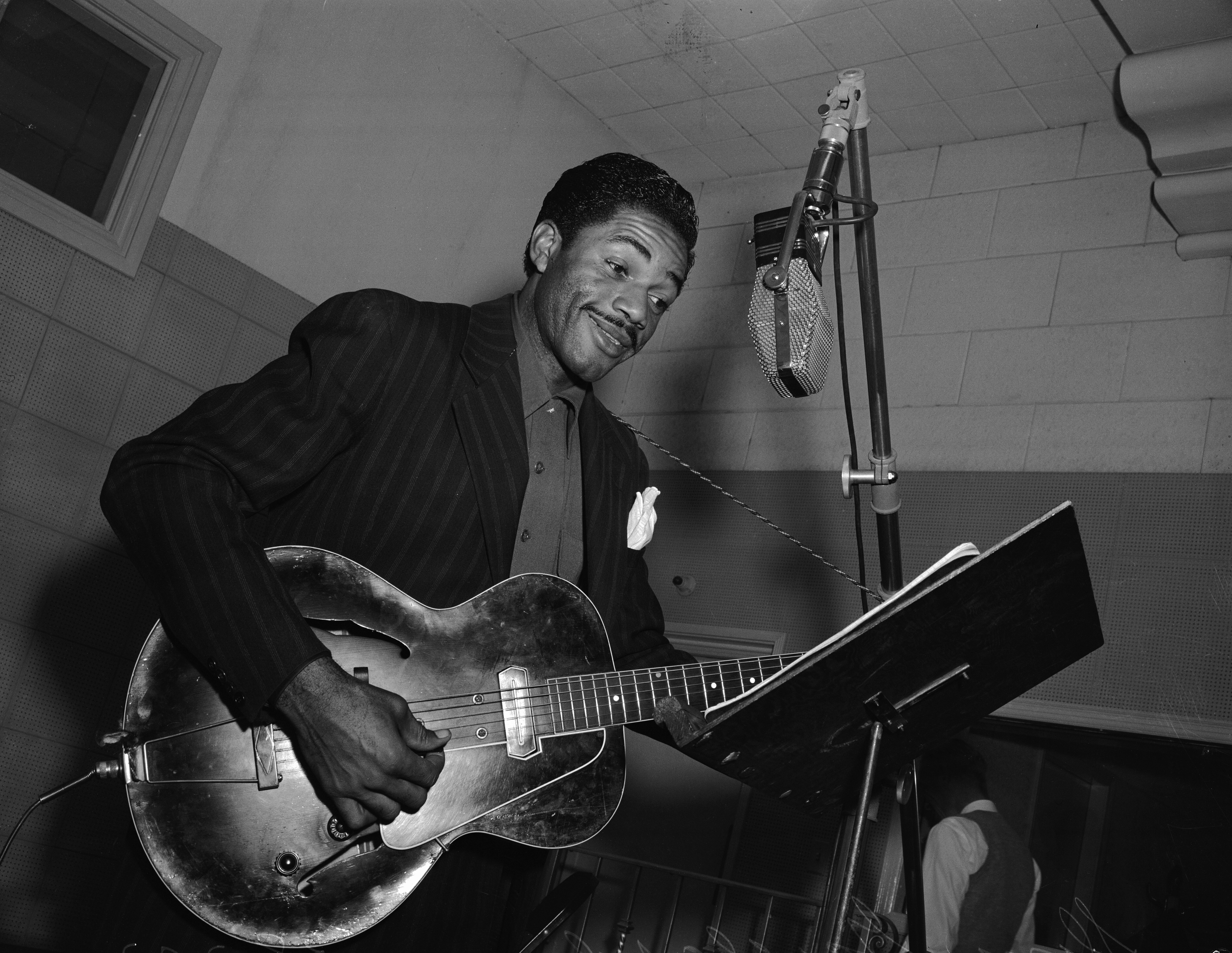
Gaillard in 1947

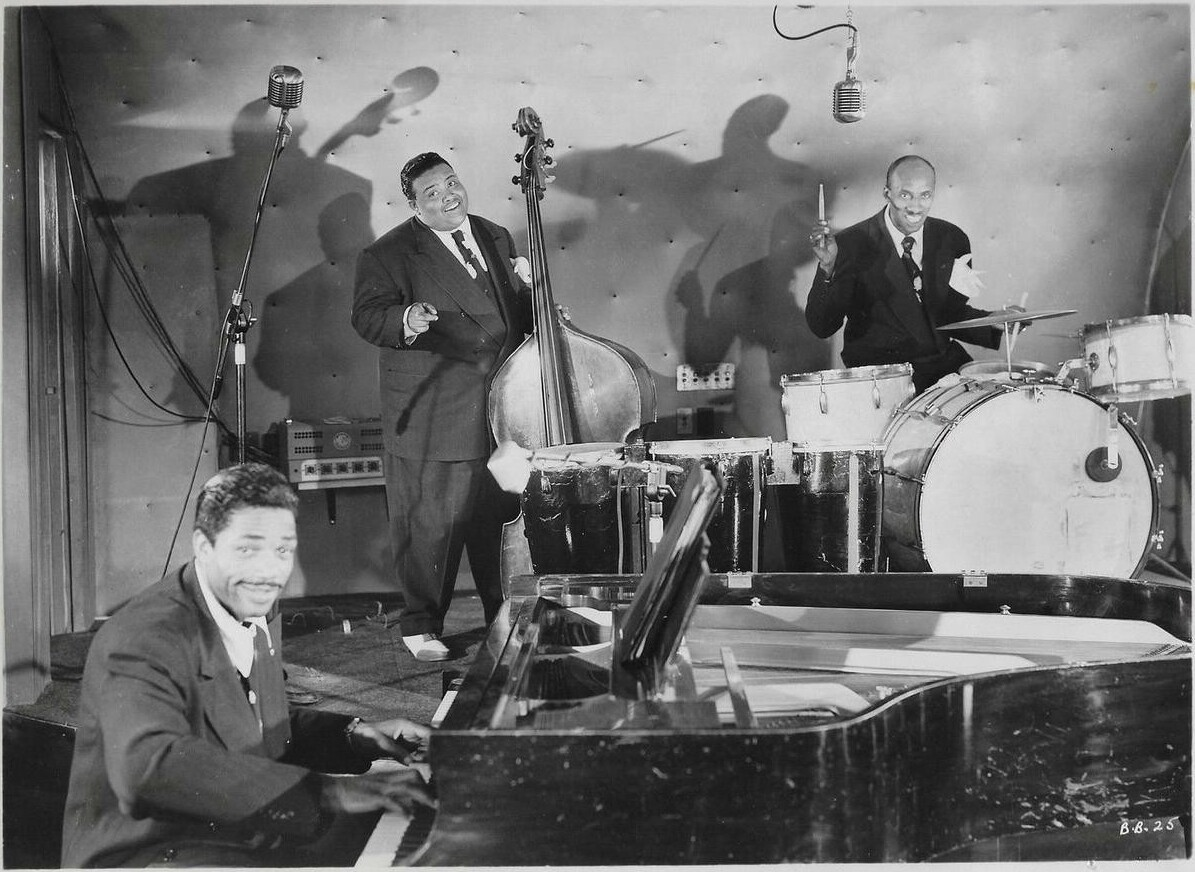
The Slim Gaillard Trio in 1947

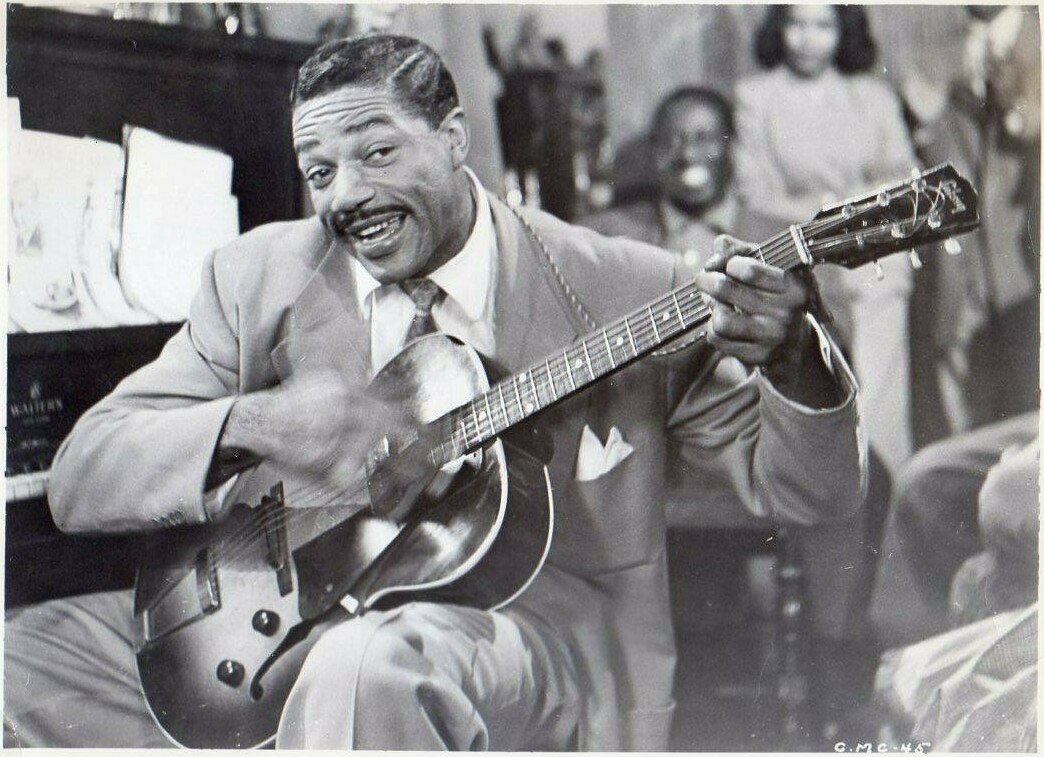
Gaillard in a press photo for the 1954 film Go, Man, Go!

In December 1942, Gaillard was drafted into the United States Army Air Forces. There, Corporal Gaillard was an assistant crew chief working on Martin B-26 Marauder bombers at Laughlin Army Air Field in Del Rio, Texas. He was discharged before the end of the war after a year and seven months of service, six months after being diagnosed with chronic frontal sinusitis. He resumed his music career on his release from the draft in 1944. Upon his return he released the song "Atomic Cocktail", which featured seemingly lighthearted lyrics laced with symbolism about nuclear war.

Gaillard later teamed with bassist Bam Brown, and their successes included the hipster anthem "Opera in Vout (Groove Juice Symphony)". They can be seen in O'Voutie O'Rooney, a 1947 motion picture featurette filmed live at one of their nightclub performances. Slim and Bam were featured at the first Cavalcade of Jazz concert at Wrigley Field in Los Angeles produced by Leon Hefflin Sr. on September 23, 1945, along with Count Basie. Gaillard also played for the 2nd Cavalcade of Jazz at Wrigley Field on October 12, 1946, and for the 3rd Cavalcade of Jazz, also at Wrigley Field on September 7, 1947.

In the late 1940s and early 1950s, Gaillard frequently opened at Birdland for Charlie Parker, Flip Phillips, and Coleman Hawkins. His December 1945 session with Parker and Dizzy Gillespie is notable, both musically and for its relaxed convivial air. "Slim's Jam", from that session, is one of the earliest known recordings of Parker's speaking voice. In 1949, Gaillard was playing in San Francisco. An account of meeting Gaillard at a performance there can be found near the end of Part Two of On the Road.

Gaillard could play several instruments and manage to turn the performance from jazz to comedy. He would play guitar with his left hand fretting with fingers pointing down over the fingerboard (instead of the usual way up from under it), or would play credible piano solos with palms facing up.

Gaillard wrote the theme for the Peter Potter radio show, and wrote and recorded the "Don Pitts On the Air" theme in 1950 for San Francisco DJ Don Pitts. On March 27, 2008, the Pitts theme entered the archives of the Rock and Roll Hall of Fame in Cleveland, Ohio.

In the early 1960s, Gaillard lived in San Diego, California. During that time, he recorded several singles and performed with local bands. Under the name Slim Delgado, he recorded "Frank Rhoads Round", a rock-and-roll single for the Xavier label. On the B-side is a song called "Dr. Free".

Gaillard appeared on several TV shows during the 1960s and 1970s, including Marcus Welby, M.D., Charlie's Angels, Mission: Impossible, Medical Center, The Flip Wilson Show, and Then Came Bronson. He also appeared in the 1970s TV series Roots: The Next Generations and reprised some of his old hits on the NBC prime-time variety program The Chuck Barris Rah Rah Show.

By the early 1980s, Gaillard was touring the European jazz festival circuit, playing with such musicians as Arnett Cobb. He also performed with George Melly and John Chilton's Feetwarmers, appearing on their BBC television series and occasionally deputising for Melly when he was unwell. Gaillard's onstage behavior was often erratic and nerve-wracking for the accompanying musicians. He made a guest appearance on Show 106 of the 1980s program Night Music, an NBC late-night music series hosted by David Sanborn.

Gaillard followed Dizzy Gillespie's advice to move to Europe and settled in London in 1983. Around Christmas 1985, Gaillard recorded the album Siboney at Gateway Studios in Battersea, London, produced by Joe Massot. As Massot recalled later:

I was introduced as Cuban. "Rooney! I am Cuban too." [...] Slim said how much he wanted to make a Latin record and talked about his friend the great Cuban leader Machito. This was 1985. I had been flying between Angola, where Cuban troops were fighting and Miami where one million exiled Cubans live. We talked of all those Cubans who wanted to go back to Cuba but couldn't. [...] In his inimitable, enthusiastic way Slim was trying to sell me, a movie maker, the idea of recording an album.

— Joe Massot, Siboney.

In 1986, Gaillard appeared in the musical film Absolute Beginners, singing "Selling Out". In the autumn of 1989, the BBC aired director Anthony Wall's four-part documentary on Gaillard entitled Slim Gaillard's Civilisation.

== Death ==
Gaillard died of cancer in London on February 26, 1991. His unique and varied career spanned nearly six decades. Gaillard was survived by a number of children including Janis Hunter Gaye (1956 – 2022), former wife of singer-songwriter Marvin Gaye.

== Languages used in songs ==
- Gaillard used Yiddish in at least two of his songs, "Dunkin' Bagel" and "Matzo Balls", where he refers to numerous ethnic dishes typically eaten by Ashkenazi Jews. The songs were issued by the Slim Gaillard Quartet in 1945 on the Melodisc label, featuring Gaillard on guitar, Zutty Singleton on drums, "Tiny" Brown on bass and Dodo Marmarosa on piano. "Dunkin' Bagel" was later included in the 2010 compilation CD Black Sabbath: The Secret Musical History of Black-Jewish Relations, issued by the Idelsohn Society for Musical Preservation.
- Gaillard recorded a Greek folk song, "Tee say malee" ("Why Do You Care").
- Arabic is used in some of Gaillard's songs such as "Yep-Roc-Heresy" and "Arabian Boogie".
- Irish is present in the name O'Voutie O'Rooney, the title of his 1947 movie and reminiscent of "Vout-o-Reenee", Gaillard's name for his invented language.

== Discography ==
- Mish Mash (Mercury, 1953)
- Opera in Vout/Boogie Woogie at the Philharmonic with Meade Lux Lewis (Clef, 1953)
- Slim Gaillard Cavorts (Clef, 1953)
- Smorgasbord...Help Your Self (Verve, 1956)
- Slim Gaillard with Dizzie Gillespie and Orchestra (Halo, 1957)
- Slim Gaillard Rides Again! (Dot, 1959)
- Central Avenue Breakdown Volume 2 with Teddy Edwards, Barney Kessel (Onyx, 1974)
- At Birdland (Hep, 1979)
- The Voutest! (Hep, 1982)
- Anytime, Anyplace, Anywhere! with Buddy Tate, Jay McShann (Hep, 1983)
- Roots of Vouty (Putti Putti Music, 1983)
- Steve Allen's Hip Fables with Al Jazzbeaux Collins (Doctor Jazz, 1983)
- Cement Mixer Put-Ti Put-Ti (Folklyric, 1984)
- Live at Ronnie Scott's London (DRG, 1986)
- Siboney (Trojan World, 1991)

== Filmography ==
=== Film ===
- Hellzapoppin' (1941) – Specialty
- Almost Married (1942) – Specialty Act
- Sweetheart of Sigma Chi (1946) – And His Trio
- O'Voutie O'Rooney (1947) – Himself
- Stairway for a Star (1947) – Slim Gaillard
- Go, Man, Go! (1954) – Himself
- Too Late Blues (1961) – Piano Player / Party Singer (uncredited)
- Planet of the Apes (1968)
- The Curious Female (1970) – Lushcomb
- Willie Dynamite (1974) – Bum watching Willie's Car (uncredited)
- Absolute Beginners (1986) – Party Singer
- Sky Bandits (1986) – Organ player (final film role)

=== Television ===
- Mission Impossible (1966–1973)
- Marcus Welby, M.D. (1969–1976) – Odie Langston
- Medical Center (1969–1976) – Piano Player
- Then Came Bronson (1969–1970) – Bollie Wallace
- Flip (The Flip Wilson Show) (1970–1974)
- Charlie's Angels (1976–1981)
- The Chuck Barris Rah Rah Show (February–April 1978)
- Roots: The Next Generations (February 18–24, 1979) – Sam Wesley
- What's Happening!! (March 16, 1979) – Al
- Love's Savage Fury (May 20, 1979) – Moss

=== Documentary ===
- Arena Special, Slim Gaillard's Civilisation (1989):
1. "A Traveller's Tale" (52:51), on October 22, 1989
2. "How High the Moon" (60:50), on October 29, 1989
3. "My Dinner with Dizzy" (59:59), on November 5, 1989
4. "Everything's OK in the UK" (54:40), on November 12, 1989
- The Small Black Groups (2003)
