= Slam Stewart =

American jazz double-bass player (1914–1987)

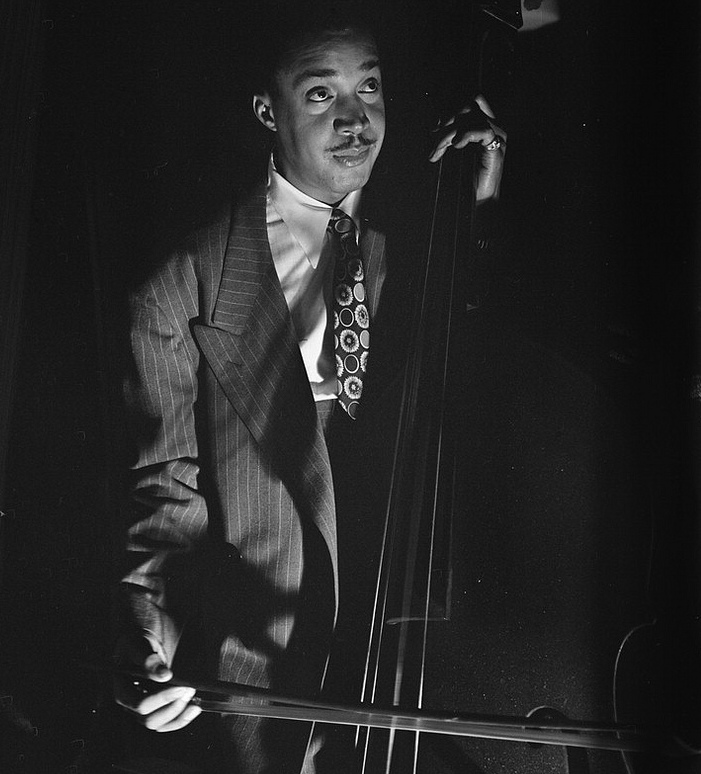
- Stewart, c. 1946

Background information
- Born: Leroy Elliott Stewart; September 21, 1914; Englewood, New Jersey, U.S.
- Died: December 10, 1987 (aged 73) Binghamton, New York, U.S.
- Genres: Jazz
- Occupation: Musician
- Instrument: Double bass
- Years active: mid-1930s–1987

Leroy Eliot "Slam" Stewart (September 21, 1914 – December 10, 1987) was an American jazz double-bass player whose trademark style was his ability to bow the bass (arco) and simultaneously hum or sing an octave higher. He was a violinist before switching to bass at the age of 20.

== Biography ==
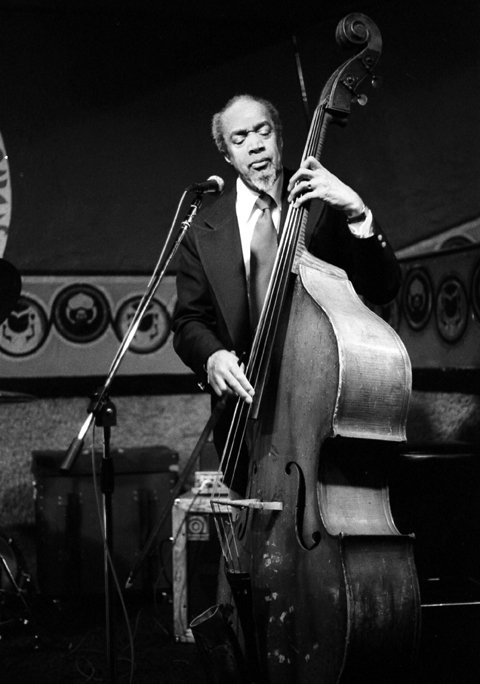
Stewart at Keystone Korner, San Francisco, California, on April 28, 1981

Stewart was born in Englewood, New Jersey, United States, and began playing string bass while attending Dwight Morrow High School. While attending the Boston Conservatory, he heard Ray Perry singing along with his violin. This gave him the inspiration to follow suit with his bass. In 1937, Stewart teamed with Slim Gaillard to form the novelty jazz act Slim & Slam. The duo's biggest hit was "Flat Foot Floogie (with a Floy Floy)" in 1938.

Stewart found regular session work throughout the 1940s with Lester Young, Fats Waller, Coleman Hawkins, Erroll Garner, Art Tatum, Johnny Guarnieri, Red Norvo, Don Byas, Benny Goodman, and Beryl Booker. One of the most famous sessions he played on took place in 1945, when Stewart played with Dizzy Gillespie's group (which featured Charlie Parker). Out of those sessions came some of the classics of bebop such as "Groovin' High" and "Dizzy Atmosphere".

Stewart taught at Binghamton University in Binghamton, New York, and at Yale University. He died of congestive heart failure on December 10, 1987, in Binghamton, aged 73.

== Discography ==
"Groovin' High"
This sample of "Groovin' High", written by Dizzy Gillespie and Frank Paparelli, highlights Stewart's style of bowing while simultaneously singing/humming an octave higher. His solo picks up following a Charlie Parker saxophone solo and leads into a trumpet solo by Gillespie.

=== Studio albums ===
- Slam Stewart (1946)
- Slam Bam (1971)
- Slamboree (1972)
- Fish Scales (1975)
- Two Big Mice (1977)
- Dialogue (1978)
- Shut Yo' Mouth! (1981) with Major Holley
- The Cats Are Swingin' (1987)

=== As sideman ===
- Benny Goodman Sextet, Slipped Disc, 1945–46 (1990)
- Art Tatum, Art Tatum Live 1951–1953 Volume 6 (2004)
- Joe Turner, Big Joe Turner, Texas Style (Black & Blue, 1971)

== Filmography ==
- Hellzapoppin' (1941)
- Almost Married (1942)
- Boy! What a Girl! (1947)
