= Anna Chandler =

American actress and singer

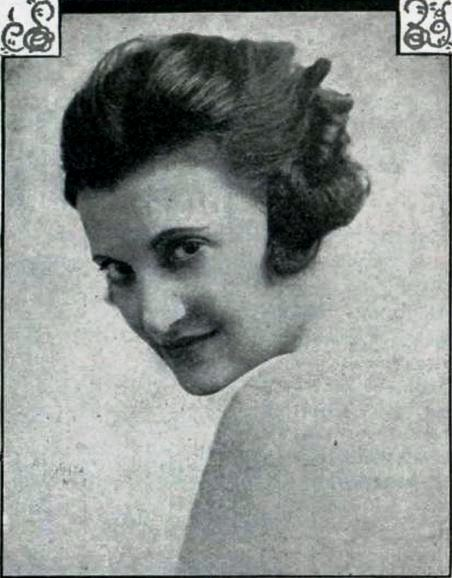
- Chandler in 1919.
- Born: July 4, 1884; New Cumberland, Pennsylvania, U.S.
- Died: July 10, 1957 (aged 73); El Sereno, California, U.S.
- Occupation: Actress
- Spouse: Jack Curtis (1900-?) (Divorced)
- Children: 1

Anna Chandler (July 4, 1884 – July 10, 1957) was an American vaudeville actress and mezzo-soprano singer of popular and light classical songs.

She was born in New Cumberland, Pennsylvania. Chandler married Jack Curtis, a booking agent. They had one child, Beatrice Curtis, who became an actress and whose first husband was the vaudevillian actor Harry Fox.

Chandler was a headline artist for the Orpheum Circuit. She sang songs in Hebrew and Italian almost exclusively during her career as a headliner on the Orpheum Circuit. On Broadway, Chandler portrayed Mrs. Anastasia Kidd in Jumping Jupiter (1911) and Bessie Bloom in Mendel, Inc. (1929).

Chandler died at age 73 in El Sereno, California.

== Filmography ==
- The Big Broadcast (1932)
- Madame Racketeer (1932)
- Gold Rush Maisie (1940)
- Redhead (1941)
- Tennessee Johnson (1942)
- Thumbs Up (1943)
- Master Minds (1949)

== Partial discography ==
Blue Amberol 2040 Come Back, I’m Pining For You (1913)

COLUMBIA A1950 (78) She’s Good Enough to Be Your Baby’s Mother (and She’s Good Enough to Vote With You)

COLUMBIA A1956 (78) You Can't Get Along With 'Em or without 'Em (recorded January 20, 1916)

EDISON 51193-R (78) My Sweetie Went Away (He Didn't Say Where, When or Why)

== Sheet music ==
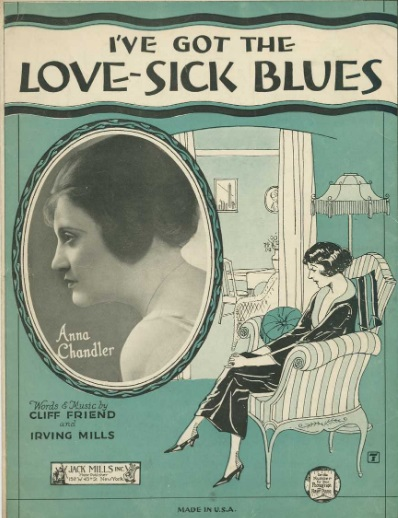
I've Got The Love-Sick Blues

(With her picture on cover)

- (Yr Unk) – Hello Wisconsin (Won't You Find My Yonnie Yonson
- 1915 – America I Love You
- 1916 – Rolling Stones (All Come Rolling Home Again) - Words by Edgar Leslie; Music by Archie Gottler
- 1917 – Yankee Doodle Learns Parlez Vous Francais
- 1917 – You've Certainly Opened My Eyes
- 1917 – Never Was A Lass Like You
- 1917 – ... Somewhere In France
- 1920 – Feather Your Nest
- 1921 – Scandinavia
- 1922 – I've Got The Love-Sick Blues, Jack Mills, Inc., publisher
- 1922 – Lost (A Wonderful Girl)
- 1922 – Lovin Sam (The Sheik of Alabam)
- 1923 – Annabelle
