= Morton Downey =

American singer (1901–1985)

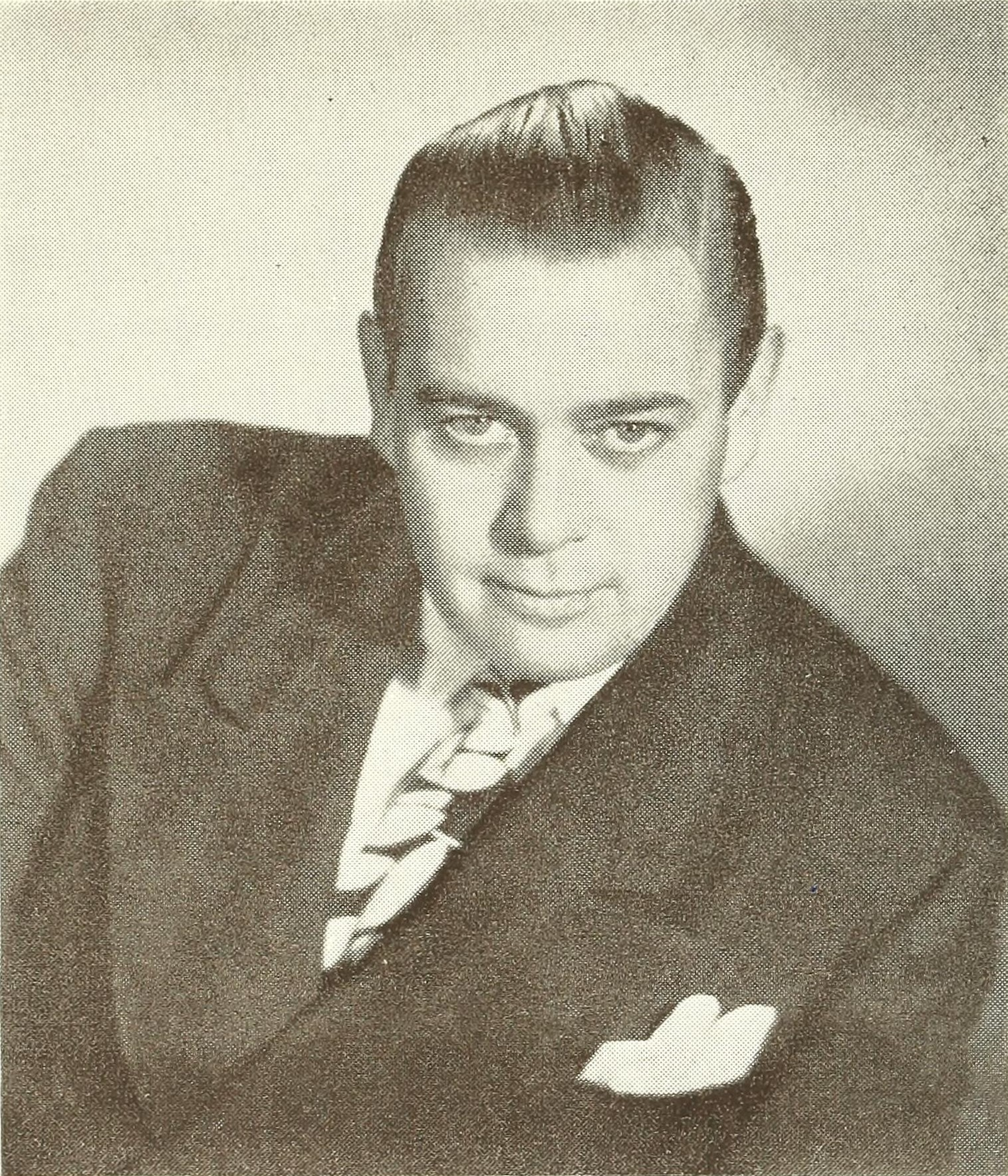
- Downey in 1943

Background information
- Also known as: Morton James
- Born: John Morton Downey; November 14, 1901; Wallingford, Connecticut, U.S.
- Died: October 25, 1985 (aged 83) Palm Beach, Florida, U.S.
- Genres: Popular song
- Instruments: Vocals, piano
- Children: 5, including Morton Jr.

John Morton Downey (November 14, 1901 – October 25, 1985), also known as Morton Downey, was an American singer and entertainer popular in the United States in the first half of the 20th century, enjoying his greatest success in the late 1920s and early 1930s. Downey was nicknamed "The Irish Nightingale".

== Early years ==
John Morton Downey was born in Wallingford, Connecticut, the fourth of six children of James A. and Bessie (Cox) Downey, a well-known family in both Wallingford and Waterbury, Connecticut. The grandson of Irish immigrants, he was known by his middle name because so many of his near relatives were named John. His father was the chief of the Wallingford Fire Department until a near fatal automobile accident necessitated his retirement. Downey began his singing career as a member of the choir of Most Holy Trinity Church in Wallingford.

== Music ==
Downey's signature sound was a very creamy and very high-timbred Irish tenor, which an uninformed listener can easily mistake for a female voice. The popularity of such highly artificial and "heady" male pop vocals peaked in the late 1920s and early 1930s. By the mid-1930s, the style was out of fashion, and Downey reduced some of his broader mannerisms and made a transition to a somewhat more "chesty" vocal timbre.

For a time in the 1920s, Downey sang with Paul Whiteman's Orchestra. He first recorded in 1923 for Edison Records under the pseudonym Morton James; the following year he recorded for Victor with the S.S. Leviathan Orchestra. In 1925, he began four years of recording for Brunswick Records. In 1926, he had a hit in the show Palm Beach Nights.

Downey toured London, Paris, Berlin, New York City and Hollywood. He also began appearing in movies, including Syncopation (1929), the first film released by RKO Radio Pictures.

Downey was also a songwriter whose most successful numbers include "All I Need Is Someone Like You", "California Skies", "In the Valley of the Roses", "Now You're in My Arms", "Sweeten Up Your Smile", "That's How I Spell Ireland", "There's Nothing New", and "Wabash Moon". He joined ASCAP in 1949.

The famous tenor vocalist Bill Kenny idolized Downey, and it is believed that he was Kenny's biggest influence. The similarities in style can be heard in Kenny's earliest recordings with The Ink Spots.

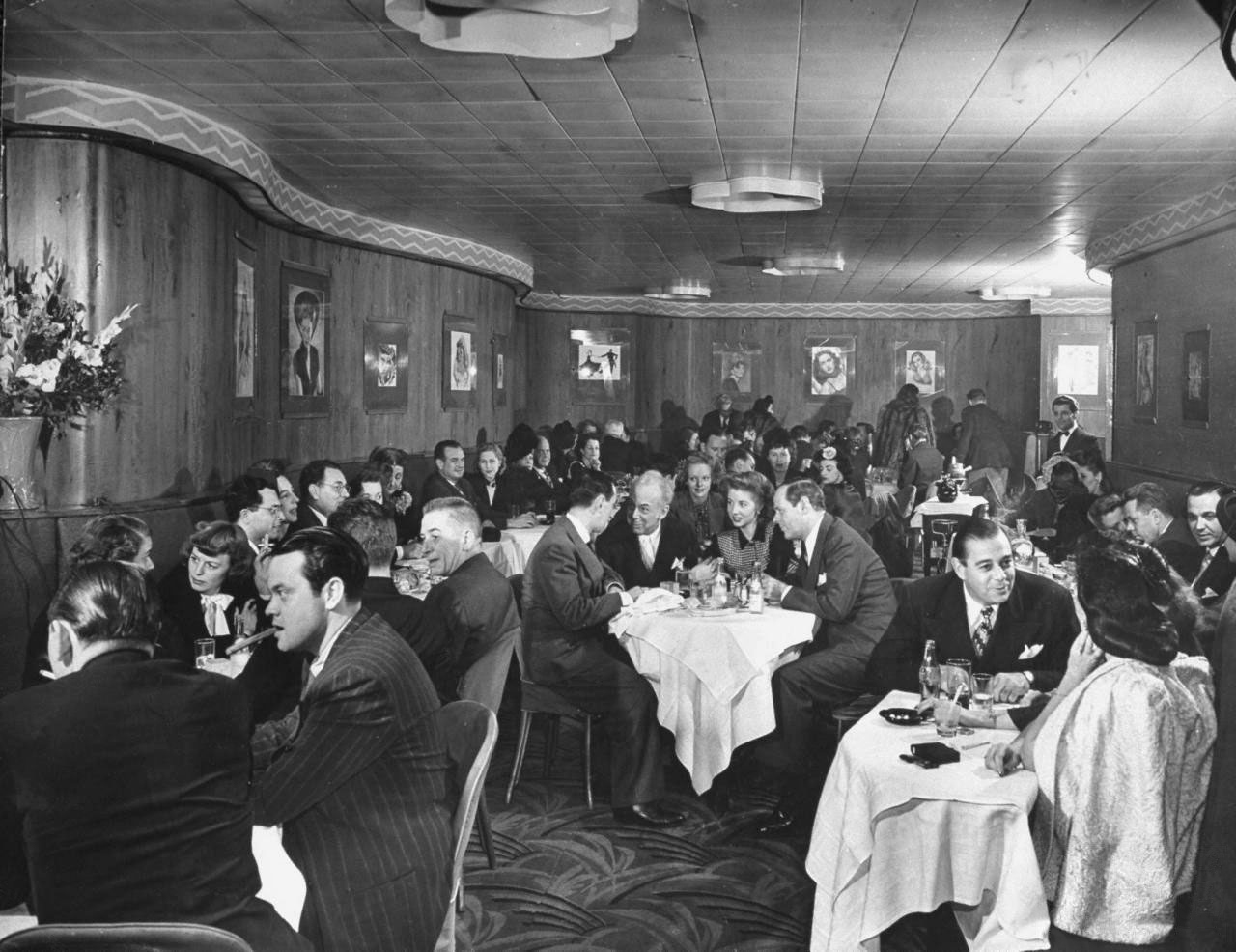
Morton Downey (right) among the patrons of the Stork Club in New York City (November 1944)

=== Radio ===
In 1930, Downey began making national radio broadcasts after opening his own nightclub (The Delmonico) in New York. He was voted America's "Radio Singer of the Year" in 1932. At the time, Downey was featured nightly on the Camel Quarter Hour radio broadcast. Beginning on January 4, 1933, he and Donald Novis co-starred in a weekly program on NBC Radio. The Wednesday night Woodbury programs had Leon Belasco's orchestra providing accompaniment. On February 5, 1945, his transcribed program Songs by Morton Downey moved from the NBC Blue Network to the Mutual Broadcasting System. The move came after Blue Network officials adopted a policy "against the use of transcriptions for network originated programs, except where technical difficulties void live broadcasts." As a result of the shift, the number of stations carrying the program more than doubled.

=== Recordings ===
In the 1930s, he recorded for ARC, Hit of the Week, and Decca Records, and in the 1940s, he made records for Columbia Records.

=== Television ===
In 1949, Downey began appearing on television. He was host of the Mohawk Showroom on NBC three nights a week. It was also known as The Morton Downey Show on the nights he was host. From 1950 to 1951, he co-hosted Star of the Family.

== Personal life ==
Morton Downey was the father of controversial right wing television personality Morton Downey Jr. by his first wife, actress Barbara Bennett (1906–1958); she was the sister of actresses Constance and Joan Bennett. Bennett's early promise as a dancer and actress gave way to her turbulent marriage with Downey. The couple married in 1929 and divorced in 1941. She married actor Addison Randall shortly afterward.

Downey and Bennett ultimately had five children, four sons and one daughter: Michael, "Sean" (John Morton Downey Jr.), Lorelle, Anthony, and Kevin.

Downey's second wife was Peggy Boyce Schulze (1922–1964), the former wife of Prince Alexander zu Hohenlohe-Waldenburg-Schillingsfürst and the granddaughter of Colorado mining industrialist William Boyce Thompson.

Downey owned a house at Squaw Island, Hyannis Port, Massachusetts, next to Joseph P. Kennedy's house. John and Jacqueline Kennedy rented Downey's house in the summer of 1963.

Downey's third wife was Ann Trainer, the widow of Howell Van Gerbig and the former wife of John Kevin Barry; they married in 1970.

Downey died following a stroke in 1985 in Palm Beach, Florida, aged 83. He was buried in the Catholic cemetery in his hometown of Wallingford, Connecticut.
