= Adelphi Genetics Forum =

British learned society for scholar-activism regarding genetics

- Formation: 1907; 119 years ago
- Founder: Sybil Gotto
- Headquarters: Newgate, London
- President: Nicholas Wood
- Website: https://adelphigenetics.org/
- Formerly called: (British) Eugenics Society; Eugenics Education Society; Galton Institute

The Adelphi Genetics Forum is a non-profit learned society based in the United Kingdom. Its aims are "to promote the public understanding of human heredity and to facilitate informed debate about the ethical issues raised by advances in reproductive technology."

It was founded by Sybil Gotto in 1907 as the Eugenics Education Society, with the aim of promoting the research and understanding of eugenics. Members came predominately from the professional class and included eminent scientists such as Francis Galton. The Society engaged in advocacy and research to further their eugenic goals, and members participated in activities such as lobbying Parliament, organizing lectures, and producing propaganda. It became the Eugenics Society in 1924 (often referred to as the British Eugenics Society to distinguish it from others). From 1909 to 1968 it published The Eugenics Review, a scientific journal dedicated to eugenics. Membership reached its peak during the 1930s.

The Society was renamed the Galton Institute in 1989. In 2021, it was renamed the Adelphi Genetics Forum. The organisation is currently based in Wandsworth, London.

== History ==
=== Creation of the Eugenics Education Society ===
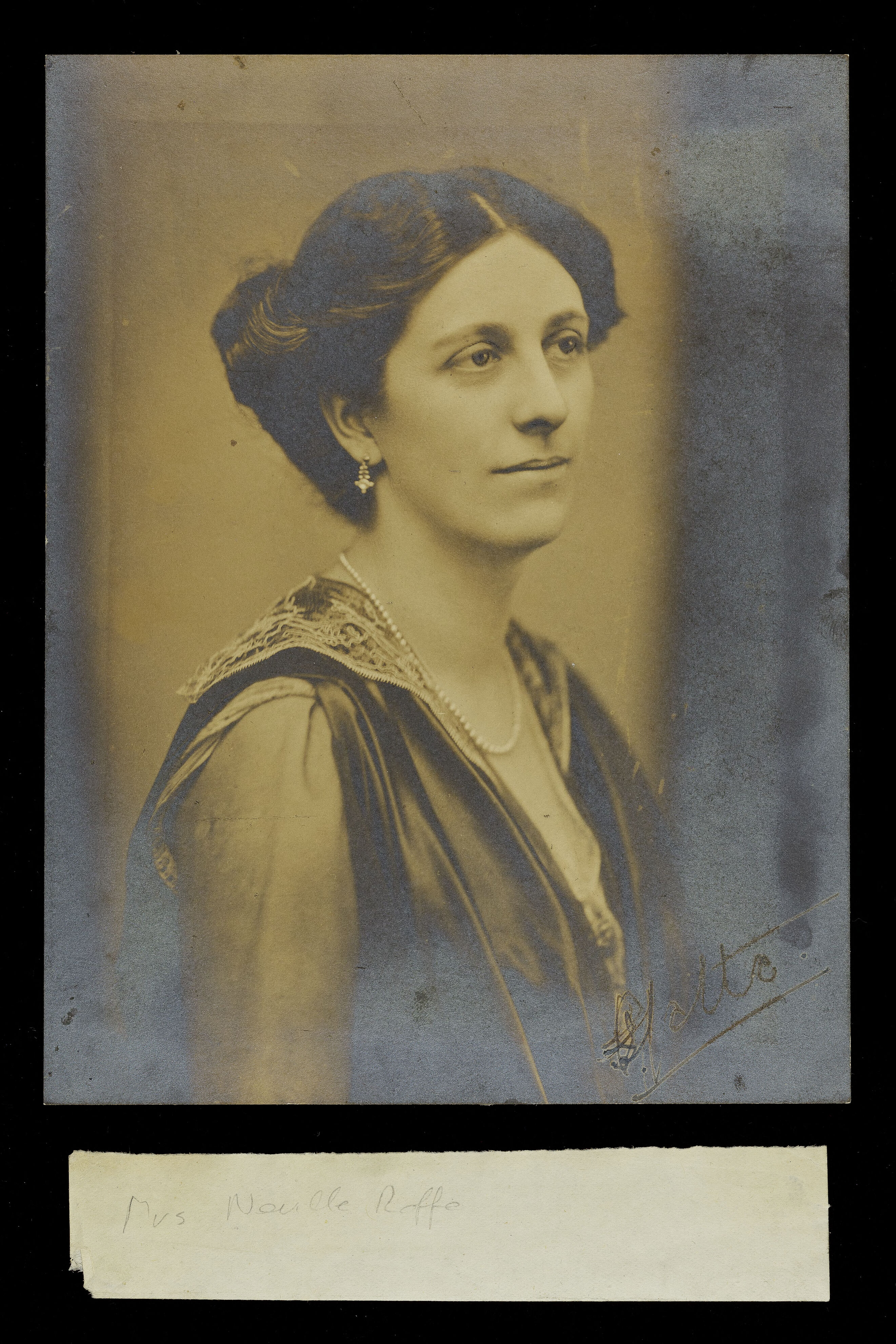
Sybil Gotto, founder of the Eugenics Education Society (20th century). Image from the Wellcome Library.

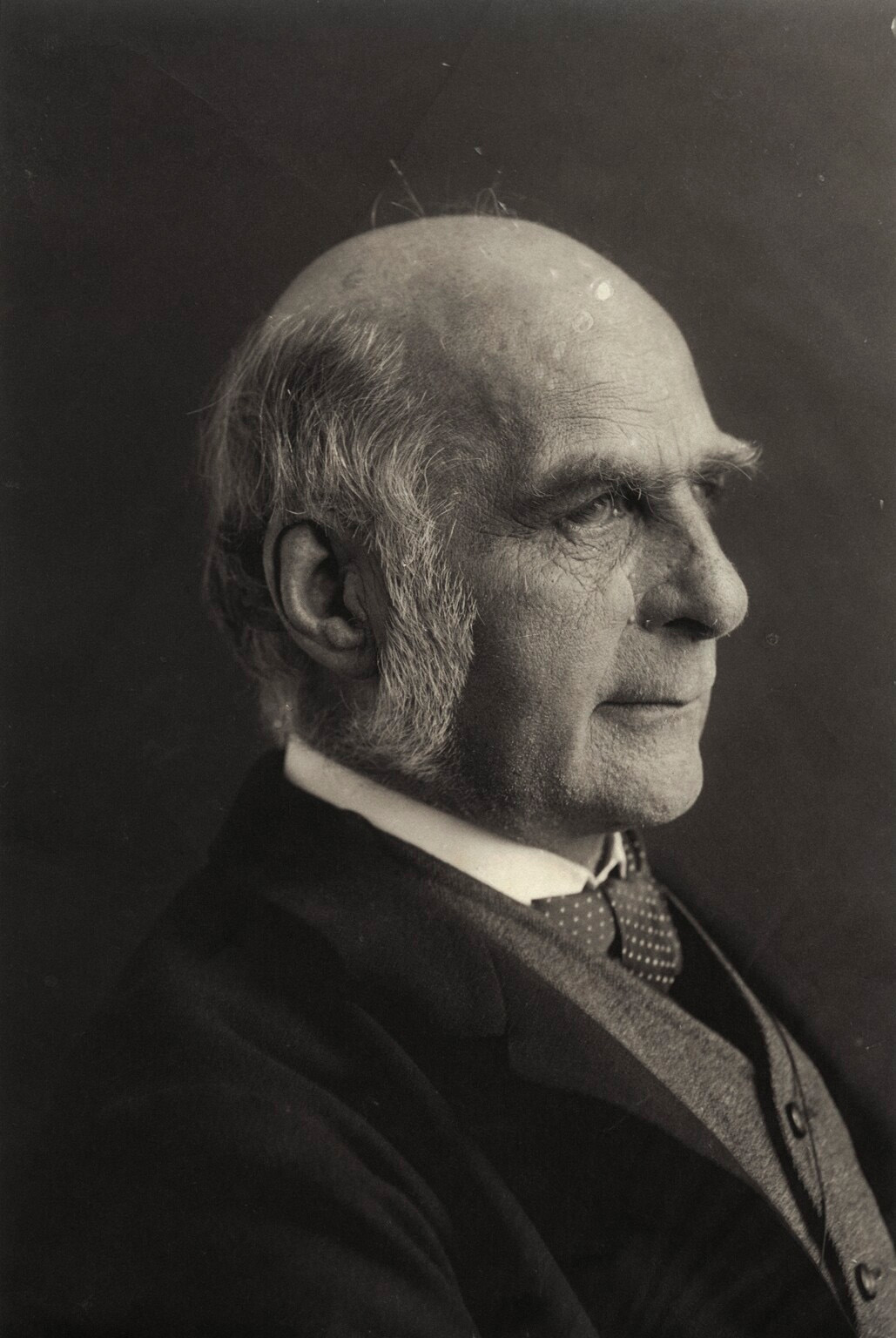
Sir Francis Galton, circa 1890s. Honorary President of the Eugenics Education Society (1907–1911). Image from the Wellcome Library.

The Eugenics Education Society (EES) was founded in 1907 at the impetus of 21-year-old Sybil Gotto, a widowed social reformer. Inspired by Francis Galton's work on eugenics, Gotto began looking for supporters to start an organization aimed at educating the public about the benefits of eugenics. She was introduced to the lawyer Montague Crackanthorpe, who would become the second president of the EES, by James Slaughter, the Secretary of the Sociological Society. Crackanthorpe introduced Gotto to Galton, the statistician who coined the term "eugenics." Galton would go on to be Honorary President of the Society from 1907 to 1911. Gotto and Crackanthorpe presented their vision before a committee of the Moral Education League, requesting that the League change its name to the Eugenic and Moral Education League, but the committee decided that a new organization should be formed exclusively devoted to eugenics. The EES was located in Eccleston Square, London.
The goals of Eugenics Education Society, as stated in first issue of the Eugenics Review were:

1. “Persistently to set forth the National Importance of Eugenics in order to modify public opinion, and create a sense of responsibility in the respect of bringing all matters pertaining to human parenthood under the domination of Eugenic ideals.
2. To spread a knowledge of the Laws of heredity so far as they are surely known, and so far as that knowledge might affect the improvement of the race.
3. To further Eugenic Teaching at home, in the schools, and elsewhere."

=== Activities ===
==== 1907 to 1939 ====
The main activities the Eugenics Education Society engaged in were research, propaganda, and legislative lobbying. Many campaigns were joint efforts with other social reform groups. The EES met with 59 other organizations between 1907 and 1935.

Shortly after the Society was founded, members protested the closing of London institutions housing alcoholic women. A resolution was drafted proposing that alcoholics be segregated to prevent their reproduction, as the EES held the eugenic belief that alcoholism was heritable. This resolution proved unsuccessful in Parliament in 1913.

In 1910, the Society's Committee on Poor Law Reform rebutted both the Majority and Minority Reports of the Royal Commission on the Poor Law, declaring their belief that poverty was rooted in the genetic deficiencies of the working class. This view was published in a special Poor Law issue of the Eugenics Review. The Committee suggested that paupers be detained in workhouses, under the authority of the Poor Law Guardians, to prevent their breeding. The same year, E. J. Lidbetter, EES member and former employee of the Poor Law Authority in London, attempted to prove the hereditary nature of poverty by compiling and studying the pedigrees of impoverished families. In 1912, President Leonard Darwin assembled a Research Committee to standardize the format and symbols used in pedigree studies. The members of the Committee were Edgar Schuster, Alexander M. Carr-Saunders, E. J. Lidbetter, Major Greenwood, Sybil Gotto, and A. F. Tredgold. The standardized pedigree they produced was published in the Eugenics Review and later adopted by Charles Davenport's Eugenics Record Office at Cold Spring Harbor in the United States.

In 1912, a group of physicians from the EES met unsuccessfully with the President of the Local Government Board to advocate for the institutionalization of those infected with venereal disease. The Society’s interest in venereal disease continued during WWI, when the Royal Commission on Venereal Diseases was formed with the inclusion of members of the EES.

In 1916, EES President Leonard Darwin, son of Charles Darwin, published a pamphlet entitled “Quality not Quantity,” encouraging members of the professional class to have more children. Darwin proposed a tax rebate for middle-class families in 1917, but the resolution was unsuccessful in Parliament. In 1919, Darwin stated his belief that fertility was inversely proportional to economic class before the Royal Commission on Income Tax. He feared the falling birth rate of the middle-class would result in a “national danger.”

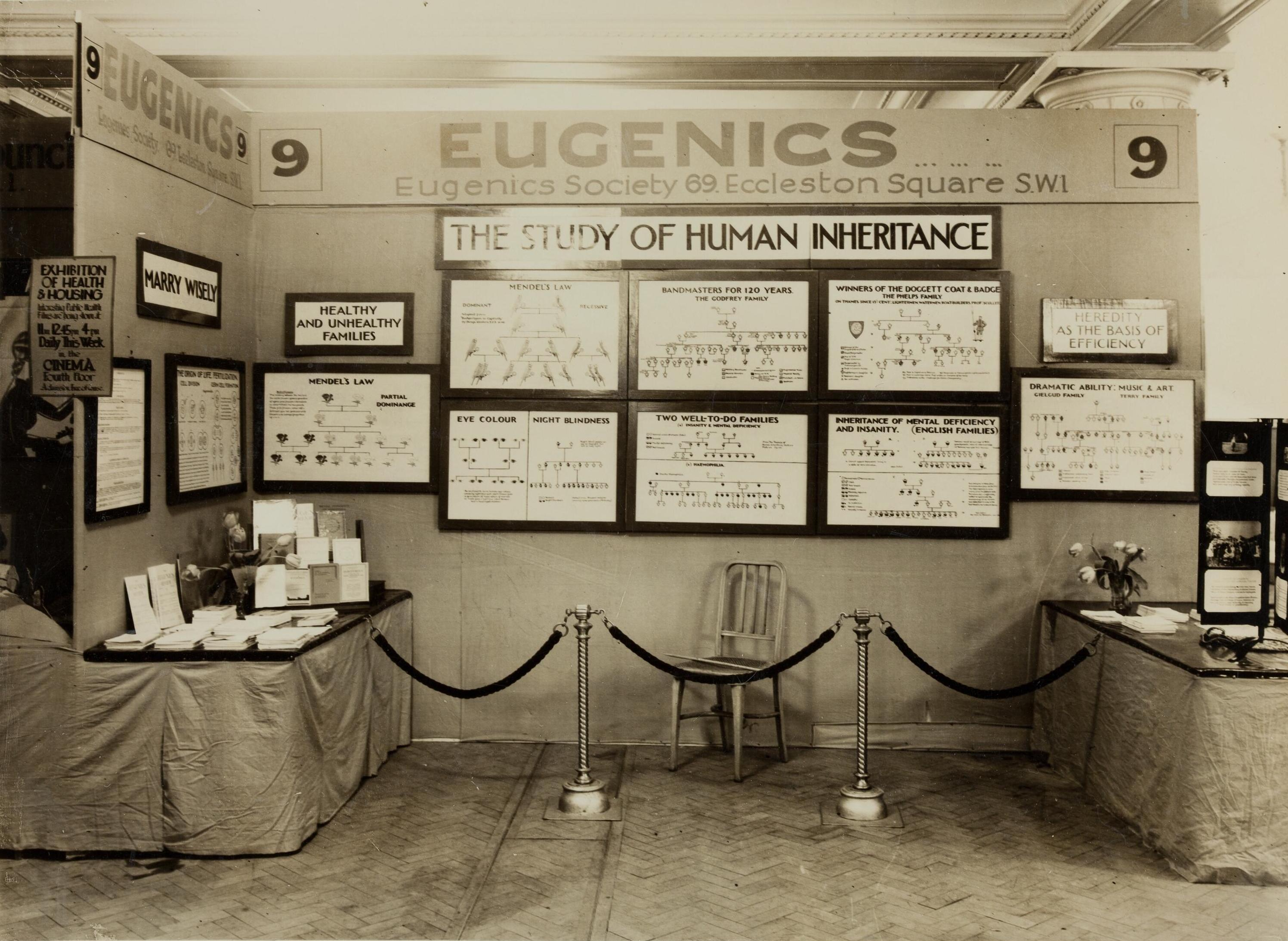
A Eugenics Society exhibit (1930s). Image from the Wellcome Library.

The Eugenics Education Society was renamed the Eugenics Society in 1924 to emphasize its commitment to scientific research extending beyond the role of public education.

In the 1920s and 1930s, members of the Eugenics Society advocated for graded Family Allowances in which wealthier families would be given more funds for having more children, thus incentivizing fertility in the middle and upper classes. Statistician and EES member R. A. Fisher argued in 1932 that existing Family Allowances that only funded the poor were dysgenic, as they did not reward the breeding of individuals the EES viewed as eugenically desirable.

In 1930, the Eugenics Society formed a Committee for Legalising Sterilisation, producing propaganda pamphlets touting sterilisation as their solution for eliminating heritable "feeblemindedness".

During this time period members of the Society such as Julian Huxley expressed support for eutelegenesis, a eugenic proposal to artificially inseminate women with the sperm of men deemed mentally and physically superior in an effort to better the race.

==== 1942 to 1989 ====
The Eugenics Society underwent a hiatus during the Second World War and did not reconvene until 1942, under the leadership of General Secretary Carlos Blacker. In the postwar period, the Society shifted its focus from class differences to marriage, fertility, and the changing racial makeup of the UK.

In 1944, R. C. Wofinden published an article in the Eugenics Review describing the features of "mentally deficient" working-class families and questioning whether mental deficiency led to poverty or vice versa. Blacker argued that poor heredity was the cause of poverty, but other members of the Society, such as Hilda Lewis, disagreed with this view.

Following WWII, British eugenicists concerned by rising divorce rates and falling birth rates attempted to promote marriages between "desirable" individuals while preventing marriages between those deemed eugenically unfit. The British Social Hygiene Council, a group with ties to the Eugenics Society, formed the Marriage Guidance Council, an organization that offered pre-marital counseling to young couples. In 1954, the Eugenics Society was referred to by the North Kensington Marriage Welfare Centre's pamphlet "Eugenic Guidance," as a source for consultation for couples worried about passing on their "weaknesses."

As a result of the British Nationality Act 1948, which enabled Commonwealth citizens to immigrate to the UK, postwar Britain saw an influx of non-white populations. The Eugenics Society became concerned with changes to the racial makeup of the country, exemplified by its publication of G. C. L. Bertram's 1958 broadsheet on immigration from the West Indies. Bertram claimed that races were biologically distinct due to their evolved adaptations to different environments, and that miscegenation should only be permitted between similar races.

In 1952, Blacker stepped down as Secretary of the Eugenics Society to become the administrative chairman of the International Planned Parenthood Federation, or IPPF. The IPPF was sponsored in part by the Eugenics Society and headquartered within the Society's offices in London. Blacker's influence continued in 1962, when he published an article in the Eugenics Review defending voluntary sterilization as humanitarian effort beneficial to mothers and their existing children.

In 1957, Blacker addressed the dwindling membership of the Society (from 768 in 1932 to 456 in 1956) in "The Eugenics Society's Future". He recommended that the Society "pursue eugenic ends by less obvious means, that is by a policy of crypto-eugenics, which was apparently proving successful with the US Eugenics Society." In February 1960, the Council of the Society resolved that their "activities in crypto-eugenics should be pursued vigorously..." and to change its name to "The Galton Society".

The last volume of the Eugenics Review was published in 1968. It was succeeded by the Journal of Biosocial Science. Following the 1960s, the Eugenics Society experienced a loss of support and prestige and eventually shifted its focus from eugenics in Britain to biosocial issues such as fertility and population control in Third World countries. The Eugenics Society changed its name to the Galton Institute in 1989, a reflection of the negative public sentiment towards eugenics following WWII.

==== Crypto-eugenics ====
In 1928, the Society published the first draft of its Sterilization Bill in the Eugenics Review. The following year a Parliamentary Committee for Legalising Eugenic Sterilization was established and, in July 1931, Archibald Church M.P. (a member of both the Committee and of the Eugenics Society) rose in the House of Commons to introduce a bill “to enable mental defectives to undergo sterilizing operations or sterilizing treatment upon their own application, or that of their spouses or parents or guardians.” In his speech, Church said that the bill was "... merely a first step in order that the community as a whole should be able to make an experiment on a small scale so that later on we may have the benefit of the results and experience gained in order to come to conclusions before bringing in a Bill for the compulsory sterilisation of the unfit." Nonetheless, it was defeated.

At this point, “three weighty organisations” joined the campaign and “a concerted petition for an official inquiry was submitted to the then Minister of Health.” This led to the formation of a Departmental Committee on Sterilization (the Brock Committee) in June 1932. The apparent groundswell of support for sterilization was deceptive. According to John Macnicol: “Blacker admitted in private that the lobbying technique of the [Eugenics] society was to make it appear as if the demand for an official enquiry emanated from these large bodies, whereas in fact it was the [Eugenics] society that was masterminding the campaign”. “Between June 1932 and January 1934 the Brock committee held thirty-six meetings and interviewed sixty witnesses. Dominated by its chairman, Laurence Brock, who pulled every string to assist the society in its campaign (thus flagrantly violating civil service neutrality), the committee’s report recommended the legalization of voluntary sterilization for three identifiable categories of patient — mental defectives of the mentally disordered, persons suffering from a transmissible physical disability (for example, hereditary blindness), or persons likely to transmit mental disorder or defect.” Brock also met secretly with Blacker to advise him on how to improve the wording of the society’s draft sterilization bill.

This practice of secrecy became official policy in 1960. In a 1957 memorandum to the Council of the Eugenics Society, Blacker made recommendations on how to promote the eugenic cause in the aftermath of the Second World War and how to fix the Society's dwindling membership (from 768 in 1932 to 456 in 1956). He suggested that they "pursue eugenic ends by less obvious means, that is by a policy of crypto-eugenics, which was apparently proving successful with the US Eugenics Society." In February 1960, the Council resolved that their "activities in crypto-eugenics should be pursued vigorously, and specifically that the Society should increase its monetary support of the FPA [Family Planning Association] and the IPPF [International Planned Parenthood Federation]" and to change its name to "The Galton Society".

== Contemporary position on eugenics ==
As of 2023, the website of the Adelphi Genetics Forum stated that "The Adelphi Genetics Forum rejects outright the theoretical basis and practice of coercive eugenics, which it regards as having no place in modern life." Furthermore, "The Adelphi Genetics Forum wishes to state clearly and unequivocally that it deplores these outmoded and discredited ideas, which should play no part in society today," but also that "Galton's contribution to modern science deserves to be recognised and acknowledged." Former President Veronica van Heyningen has acknowledged that "Galton was a terrible racist," but she believes it is "reasonable to honour him by giving his name to institutions" due to his significant contribution to the field of genetics.

== Finances ==
In 1930, the EES received a substantial endowment from the estate of Henry Twitchin, an English-born farmer who had moved to Western Australia in 1890 and amassed substantial pastoral lease holdings, before retiring to the French Riviera. The EES received the residue of Twitchin's estate, which had been valued at up to £160,000 in 1921 (equivalent to £7,000,000 in 2025). The bequest made the society "financially comfortable, ensured its archives were saved and gave it an influence far beyond its small membership".

== Membership and associated bodies ==
The EES did not exist in isolation, but was rather a part of a large network of Victorian reform groups that existed in Britain at the turn of the twentieth century. Members of the Society were also involved in the National Association for the Care and Protection of the Feeble-minded, the Society for Inebrity, the Charity Organisation Society, and the Moral Education League. The British eugenics movement was a predominantly middle class and professional class phenomenon. Most members of the EES were educated and prominent in their fields – at one point all members were listed in professional directories., Two-thirds of the members were scientists, and the 1914 Council of the EES was dominated by professors and physicians. Women constituted a significant portion of the Society’s members, exceeding 50% in 1913 and 40% in 1937. While the majority of members came from the professional class, there were also a few members from the clergy and aristocracy, such as Reverend William Inge, the Dean of St Paul’s Cathedral, and the Earl and Countess of Limerick.

The Society underwent considerable growth in its early years. By 1911, the London headquarters was supplemented by branches in Cambridge, "Oxford, Liverpool, Manchester, Birmingham, Southampton, Glasgow, and Belfast," as well as abroad in "Australia and New Zealand". The Society found support in leading academic institutions. Statistician R. A. Fisher was a founding member of the Cambridge University Branch, where Leonard Darwin, Reginald Punnett, and Reverend Inge lectured about the eugenic dangers a fertile working class posed to the educated middle class.

In Australia, the Eugenics Education Society of New South Wales was formed in 1912 as a formal affiliate of the British body, with Richard Arthur as president and John Eldridge as secretary. Eldridge was the driving force behind the organisation, which fell into abeyance in 1922 after he became disaffected with the British organisation's hardline policies. By 1914 there were reportedly four EES branches in New Zealand, located in Christchurch, Dunedin, Timaru and Wellington, but they were short-lived. Other eugenics organisations in Australia and New Zealand did not formally affiliate with the EES.

=== Prominent members ===
- Leonard Arthur, tried for murder in 1981 but acquitted
- The 1st Earl of Balfour
- Florence, Lady Barrett
- The 1st Baron Beveridge
- Paul Blanshard
- Sir Walter Bodmer
- The 1st Baron Brain
- Chris Brand
- Sir Cyril Burt
- Neville Chamberlain, British Prime Minister (1937–1940)
- Sir Winston Churchill, Honorary Vice President
- Sir John Cockburn
- David Coleman
- James Herbert Curle
- Archbishop Charles D'Arcy
- Charles Davenport, Vice President (1931)
- Mary Dendy
- Sir Robert Edwards
- Havelock Ellis
- Hans Eysenck
- Sir Ronald Fisher
- Edmund B. Ford
- Agnes Fry
- Sir Francis Galton, after whom the institute was eventually renamed
- Charles Goethe
- Ezra Gosney
- Madison Grant
- David Starr Jordan, Vice President (1916, 1931)
- Franz Josef Kallmann
- John Harvey Kellogg
- The 1st Baron Keynes, Director (1937–1944), Vice President (1937)
- Richard Lynn
- James Meade
- Sir Peter Medawar
- The Baroness Mitchison
- Sybil Neville-Rolfe, née Gotto, founder
- Henry Fairfield Osborn
- Frederick Osborn
- Roger Pearson
- Alfred Ploetz, Vice President (1916)
- Margaret Pyke
- Margaret Sanger
- Eliot Slater
- Marie Stopes
- James Mourilyan Tanner
- Richard Titmuss
- Alice Vickery
- Sir Arnold Wilson
- Frank Yates

== Presidents ==
Eugenics Education Society (1911–1926)

- James Crichton-Browne, President (1908–1909)
- Montague Crackanthorpe, President (1909–1911)
- Leonard Darwin, son of Charles Darwin, President (1911–1929)

Eugenics Society (1926–1989)

- Bernard Mallet, President (1929–1933)
- Humphry Rolleston, President (1933–1935)
- Thomas Horder, President (1935–1949)
- Alexander Carr-Saunders, President (1949–1953)
- Charles Galton Darwin, grandson of Charles Darwin, President (1953–1959)
- Julian Huxley, Vice-president (1937–1944), President (1959–1962)
- James Gray, President (1962–1965)
- Robert Platt, President (1965–1968)
- Alan Parkes, President (1968–1970)
- P. R. Cox, President (1970–1972)
- C. O. Carter, President (1972–1976)
- Harry Armytage, President (1976–1982)
- Bernard Benjamin, President (1982–1987)

Galton Institute

- Margaret Sutherland, President (1987–1993)
- G. Ainsworth Harrison, President (1993–1994)
- Peter Diggory, President (1994–1996)
- Robert Peel, President (1996–1999)
- John Timson, President (1999–2002)
- Steve Jones, President (2002–2008)
- Walter Bodmer, President (2008–2014)
- Veronica van Heyningen, President (2014–2020)
- Turi King, President (2020–2021)

Adelphi Genetics Forum (2021–present)

- Turi King, President (2021–2023)
- Nicholas Wood, President (2023–present)

== Collections ==
The archive of the Adelphi Genetics Forum is held at the Wellcome Collection, London. The collection includes correspondence, governance papers, and administrative files. The archive also contains material relating to Marie Stopes, who left the Forum her birth control clinic and some books in her will.

== See also ==
- American Eugenics Society
- Amy Barrington
- Eugenics
- Human Betterment Foundation
- Arthur Jensen
- Walter Kistler
- Glayde Whitney
- Social hygiene movement
