= Sybil Neville-Rolfe =

Founder of the Eugenics Society (1885–1955)

Sybil Katherine Neville-Rolfe OBE
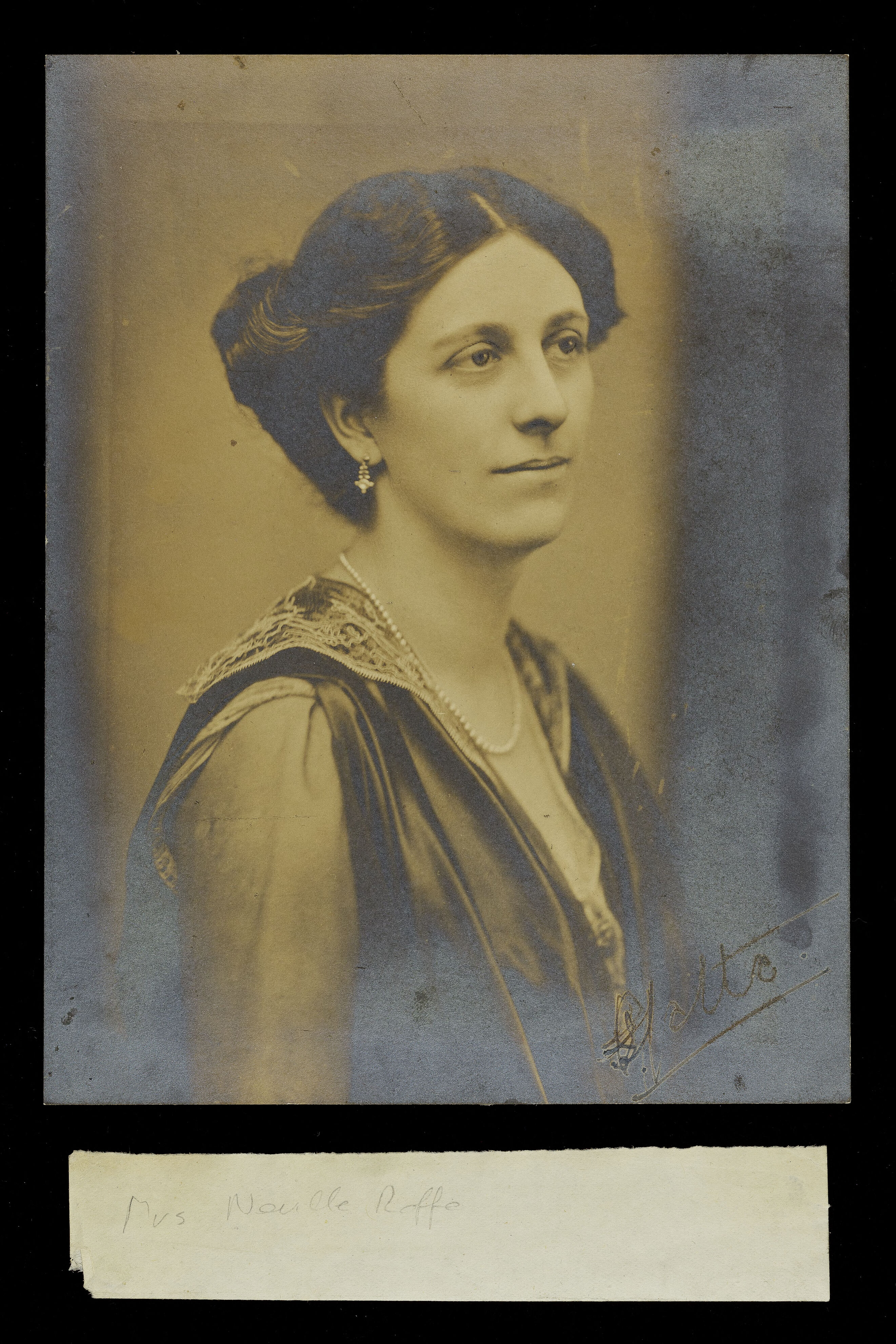
- Born: Sybil Katherine Burney; 22 June 1885; Greenwich, London, England
- Died: 3 August 1955 (aged 70); London, England
- Other name: Sybil Katherine Gotto
- Occupation: Social hygienist
- Relatives: Cecil Burney (father); Dennistoun Burney (brother)

Sybil Neville-Rolfe OBE (22 June 1885 – 3 August 1955) was a social hygienist and founder of the Eugenics Society, and a leading figure in the National Council for Combating Venereal Diseases. She has been described as a feminist and a eugenicist.

== Career ==
Neville-Rolfe and Francis Galton founded the Eugenics Education Society (renamed the Galton Institute in the 1980's, and currently known as the Adelhpi Genetics Forum) in London in 1907, with Galton serving as its first honorary president. She took the role of honorary secretary upon the Society's founding until 1920. The Eugenics Education Society believed that social class and poverty were directly linked to one's genetics and their ideals were closely linked to the Committee of the Moral Education League (1898). She also founded the Imperial Society for Promoting Sex Education and was the Deputy Chair of the Child Welfare Council. Therefore, the Society aimed to reduce poverty in England through reducing the birth rate of the lowest classes and those of low intelligence. In 1912, she was the driving force behind the Society's organisation of the first International Eugenics Congress in South Kensington. After 1920 she acted as the Society Council's vice-president and later was elected to serve on the consultative council, a position that she held until her death in 1955.

Neville-Rolfe implemented the Mental Deficiency Act 1913. She was also one of the establishing members of the National Council for the Unmarried Mother and her Child (now known as Gingerbread) in 1918, where she worked on reforming poor-law institutions and hostels for unmarried mothers and their children. She was also a leading figure in the National Council for Combating Venereal Diseases (NCCVD) which was founded in 1914. Upon the NCCVD's founding she held the position of Honorary Secretary. Later in the NCCVD's life she held the position of secretary-general. The NCCVD changed its name to the British Social Hygiene Council in 1926, and Neville-Rolfe remained working for them until her retirement in 1944.

== Awards ==
Neville-Rolfe was awarded an OBE for her work during the First World War with the War Savings Committee in the Treasury. In 1941, she became both the first woman and the first non-American to receive the Snow Medal from the American Social Hygiene Association, for distinguished services to humanity.

== Beliefs ==
Neville-Rolfe's beliefs concerning eugenics and prostitution developed when she trained and worked as a rescue worker in a shelter for troubled girls. She was determined to study these issues in efforts to eliminate prostitution and venereal disease. She stopped working at the shelter because she felt the staff were not well educated on physiology and reproduction. She then left to find work in Bethnal Green, London, where even there, she thought the staff of rescue workers was not competent or knowledgeable about contraception. Because of this, she insisted they educate themselves further in the area of biological sciences. She also believed that single mothers were not to blame as they had been manipulated and enticed by men. In an effort to prevent this, she was determined to help educate these women on sex and contraception.

=== Eugenics ===
Neville-Rolfe published an article in 1917 titled "The Eugenic Principle in Social Reconstruction" which detailed her beliefs regarding eugenics. She believed that certain people were genetically "superior" to other people within a society, and that these people who were genetically superior to their peers but born into the lower classes would naturally rise up to attain a higher quality of life, as they were inherently more productive and useful people within society, which would be proven by the fact that they were able to achieve financial independence. Conversely, she felt that children born into families of people who had proven themselves to be of a higher genetic status than their peers could also be of a lower genetic worth than their parents and would naturally sink in status through the course of their life, and also never achieve the financial independence that is used in this system to prove one's genetic worth. She called this process eugenic selection.

Throughout her life she made several assertions as to how eugenics could be implemented into the governing bodies and institutions in Britain to preserve the Anglo-Saxon race. She felt that changes needed to be made at both a social and government level to encourage people with better genetics to marry and have children together early in life while also discouraging people who could not attain financial independence, contracted a venereal disease, or were otherwise mentally deficient from having children. To this end she suggested several changes to social norms and the policies of the government, including:

- Discouraging people who lived in workhouses from having children.
- Discouraging homosexual relationships.
- Encouraging young people to obtain financial independence early to allow them to marry and have children early in life.
- Allowing for easier access to divorce, because if young people were going to marry early there would have to be a system in place that would allow for the rectification of mistakes in their choice of partner.
- Changing the policies on illegitimate children to hold fathers accountable, along with the mother, for the care and support of their child even if that child was conceived and born out of wedlock.
- Establishing a ministry of health with a strong department focused on eugenics to collect data and learn about the genetic stock of their country and how best to implement eugenic practices.
- Encouraging eugenicists to participate in government to aid the implementation and understanding of eugenic practices.
- Establishing an economic policy of housing that would address the problems London faced at the time. This suggested policy included setting a minimum housing standard for the government to provide housing to people that could not attain financial independence. She felt that once minimum standard of housing was established all people would naturally wish to live in a better condition than the minimum. To this end the more efficient people of the community who were able to raise their standard of living would have proven that they were genetically superior to the others that could not achieve that goal, and would be encouraged to marry and have children early.
- Establishing programs to teach people about the practice of using birth control to allow women and families more control over how many children they had and the timing of their pregnancies.
- Requiring that people who want to marry submit a health declaration before being allowed to marry. She felt that upon implementation this measure would only be for informational purposes but eventually it would be possible to use this as a part of the process of the selection of citizens who were, or were not, genetically worthy of being allowed to marry and have children.
- Implementing eugenic education in schools. She felt that it was paramount for teachers to learn about eugenic practices and teach their students about the importance of eugenics.
- Implementing taxation system that benefits citizens with children more than those without; for example, giving tax breaks to families while requiring people without children to pay more taxes to make up the difference, thereby providing a financial incentive for couples to have children.

=== Prostitution ===
Throughout her life Neville-Rolfe took a stance against the practice of prostitution and suggested many ways in which this problem could be dealt with, especially within the article she published in 1918 titled "The Changing Moral Standard: Reprinted from The Nineteenth Century and After." Instead of blaming the prostitute for the profession that she ended up in, Neville-Rolfe blames the degeneration of morals and the perpetuation of the profession by three different interest groups associated with the practice: the prostitutes themselves who supply the profession, those that purchase and demand their services, and the middle-men who encourage this practice for their own material gain. Each of these groups have their own distinct subgroups.

==== Supply ====
1. The feeble-minded, who should have been cared for through provisions within the government that existed in this era to help prevent them from needing to turn to prostitution to support themselves.
2. The morally defective, who she felt should have been dealt with through amending the Mental Deficiency Act
3. Women charged and convicted of a crime who had served their sentence but, because of their conviction, find it impossible to return to their profession or be hired into another respectable profession after serving their sentence.
4. Unmarried mothers, who were often disowned by their families and fired from their jobs because of their status of unwed motherhood. The social machinations of the era often prevented these women from being able to find respectable work and many unwed mothers were forced to turn to prostitution to pay for the care of themselves and their child.
5. Normal girls led astray by wanting to have a good time and the relaxation of moral codes that condemn premarital sex.

==== Demand ====
1. Men who only turn to prostitution one or a few times before marriage, then marry and live a normal life.
2. Men who seek prostitutes and extra-marital sex after marriage
3. Men who are considered temperamentally unstable and seek out prostitutes habitually throughout the course of their lives.

==== Middle-men ====
1. The brothel-keeper, which includes women who owned and ran brothels as well as pimps, who made money through bringing together supply with demand.
2. The property owner, who could make more money by renting their property to people who intended to use it for amoral and illegal practices.
3. The liquor and amusement purveyor.

Neville-Rolfe felt that increasingly lax morals of the era were contributing to the problem of prostitution and felt that girls who left the home to take industrial jobs and attain independence were at a particular risk of becoming prostitutes themselves, who would fall under the category of normal girls who were led astray. She felt that without home influences that these girls were liable to fall to the temptation of premarital sex, as there was little provision for recreational activities for women outside of working. This would cause women to go out seeking amusements and, without considering ideas of social responsibility, they would engage in immoral behaviour. To combat this practice she suggested many changes to policy and current legislation, as well as the implementation of new legislation. These ideas included:

- Provision of organised recreation for individuals before marriage regardless of gender.
- Enforcement of the Criminal Law Amendment Act, which was meant to suppress brothels.
- Increased licensing requirements and shorter licence intervals for establishments used for amusement.
- Provisions for the care and maintenance of unwed mothers throughout pregnancy and the child's infancy.
- Provision of education of the dangers of disease and reasons to maintain chastity, including hygienic, social, and ethical reasons.
- Establishment of a police force composed of women.
- Amending the Mental Deficiency Act of 1913 to include the category "Morally Defective."
- Making the establishment of paternity of the children of unwed mothers the responsibility of the state, rather than that of the mother. This would then be used to provide for the woman and her child through the court system by forcing the father to pay for his child.
- Create committees that women who practice prostitution can be referred to who will provide remand homes for women who are tried for prostitution. These homes would provide care, supervision, and when possible professional training to these women to help prevent them from falling back into prostitution.

== Personal life ==
She was born Sybil Katherine Burney in Queen's House, Royal Naval College, Greenwich on 22 June 1885. She was the daughter of Admiral Sir Cecil Burney and Lucinda Marion Burnett. Her brother was Dennistoun Burney, a marine, aeronautical engineer, and Conservative MP. As a child, she often lodged in different naval quarters, but these moves were always temporary. She was home-schooled by French and English women who were privately hired governesses. She knew multiple languages as she travelled to France and Germany as a teenager, however even this knowledge did not compare to her yearning for a University education.

Her first husband was Lieutenant Arthur Corry Gotto, whom she married on 29 December 1905, though this marriage was extremely brief due to his death in a coaling accident in September 1906. Her second marriage was to Commander Clive Neville-Rolfe on 24 March 1917.

== Bibliography ==
- The Changing Moral Standard. Reprinted from "The Nineteenth Century and After", National Council for Combating Venereal Diseases, 1918.
- The mercantile marine and the problem of venereal disease, British Social Hygiene Council, 1924.
- The Relationship between Venereal Disease and the Regulation of Prostitution, British Social Hygiene Council, 1925.
- Poverty and Prostitution. Comprising Economic Conditions in relation to Prostitution, British Social Hygiene Council, 1934.
- Why Marry?, Faber and Faber, 1935.
- Social Biology and Welfare, G. Allen & Unwin, 1949.
- Sex in Social Life, G. Allen & Unwin, 1949.
- The eugenic principle in social reconstruction, The Eugenics Review, 1917.
