= Catherine Panter-Brick =

Medical anthropologist (born 1959)

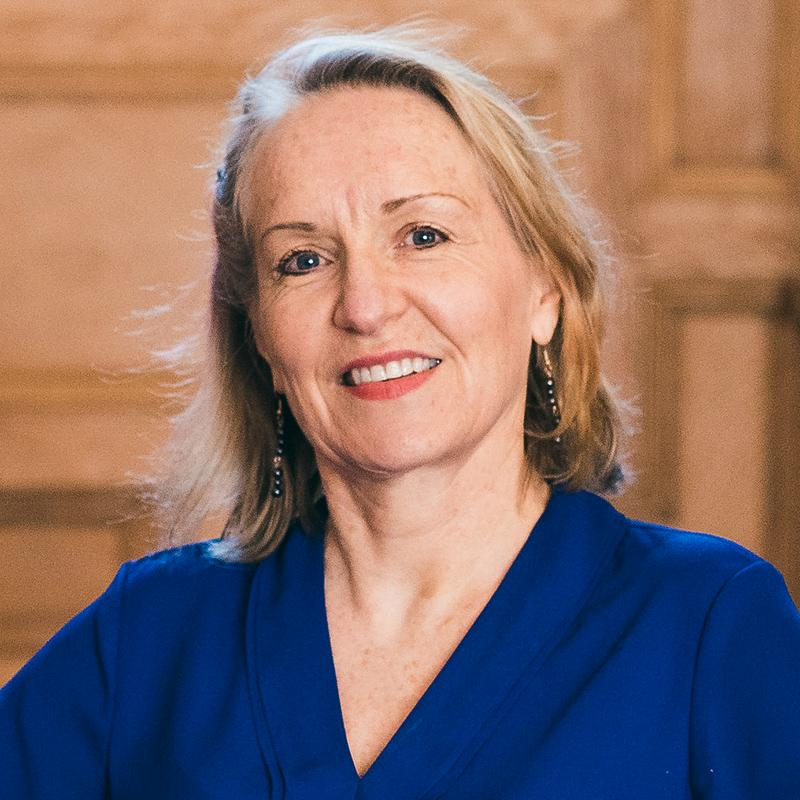
- Panter-Brick in 2017
- Born: 1959 (age 66–67)
- Title: Bruce A. and Davi-Ellen Chabner Professor

Academic background
- Education: University of Oxford (MA, MSc, DPhil)
- Academic advisor: G. A. Harrison

Academic work
- Discipline: Anthropology (medical anthropology); health (public health); global affairs
- Institutions: Durham University; Yale University

Catherine Panter-Brick (born 1959) is a medical anthropologist and Bruce A. and Davi-Ellen Chabner Professor of Anthropology, Health, and Global Affairs at Yale University, where she holds a joint appointment in the Department of Anthropology and the Jackson School of Global Affairs as well as a secondary appointment in the Yale School of Public Health. At Yale, Panter-Brick directs the undergraduate certificate program in global health studies, as well as the MacMillan Center's Program on Conflict, Resilience, and Health. She is also the head of Morse College – one of Yale's 14 residential colleges – and chairs the Council of Heads of Colleges.

Panter-Brick's research is noted for being interdisciplinary; her work includes studies of adolescence and mental health within humanitarian crises. She was recognized in 2011 with the Lucy Mair Medal, awarded by the Royal Anthropological Institute.

== Education and personal life ==
Panter-Brick was born in 1959, and was raised by a French mother and English father. She holds dual nationalities. Educated in both France and the United Kingdom, Panter-Brick graduated with a Baccalauréat from the Lycée Français de Londres in 1977. She subsequently received a B.A. degree (Note: The degree is now marked on her curriculum vitae as an M.A. due to Oxford's tradition of granting the M.A. title to B.A. graduates.) in human sciences from the University of Oxford, followed by an M.Sc. and D.Phil. in human biology and biological anthropology, respectively. She was advised by G. A. Harrison during the course of her D.Phil. degree. Panter-Brick is married to Mark Eggerman, with whom she has two sons.

== Career ==
From 1991 to 2010, Panter-Brick was a faculty member in the anthropology department of Durham University. She left in 2010 to become a professor at Yale University, where she now holds academic appointments in three departments: the Faculty of Arts and Sciences (Department of Anthropology), the Jackson School of Global Affairs, and the School of Public Health (Department of Social and Behavioral Sciences). She also serves as the head of Yale's residential Morse College and as chair of the Council of the Heads of Colleges, a council overseeing the residential college system. She is the director of the Global Health Studies Multidisciplinary Academic Program, a certificate program offered by the Jackson School to undergraduates in Yale College, and also leads the Conflict, Resilience, and Health Program of the MacMillan Center for International and Area Studies and the Peacebuilding Initiative of the Jackson School.

As a public intellectual, Panter-Brick served as the elected president of the Human Biology Association from 2020 to 2022. She is also a leading member of the Early Childhood Peace Consortium, for which she currently works as an expert consultant. (Note: The Early Childhood Peace Consortium includes Yale University and the United Nations within its international community.)

Panter-Brick's teaching experience includes undergraduate and graduate courses under the subjects of public health and social science, including epidemiology, global affairs, and international relations. For example, one of her courses, Global Health Colloquium, has included interdisciplinary learning at the United Nations in New York City as well as speakers from external organizations. Panter-Brick's students are also provided opportunities to write policy briefs commissioned by organizations such as the African Development Bank, Charité, Mercy Corps, and UNICEF.

== Research ==
Panter-Brick's medical anthropology research has a focus on maternal health and early childhood development. While completing her doctoral dissertation, she was a member of a research team from the French Centre national de la recherche scientifique. For this research, she studied "the organization of work patterns in a rural area, the arduousness of work for pregnant and lactating women, and the consequences of this for maternal-child health" in Nepal. Since then, her research has been comparative in nature, drawing from her projects on refugee mental health in Afghanistan and Syria and from her other work in Costa Rica, Ethiopia, The Gambia, India, Jordan, Mauritania, Nepal, Niger, Pakistan, Saudi Arabia, Sri Lanka, and Tanzania.

One project that highlights the scope of Panter-Brick's research was conducted from 2015 to 2017. With Panter-Brick as the principal investigator, Yale University, in collaboration with the Mercy Corps, "[measured] the health and wellbeing impacts of a scalable programme of psychosocial intervention for refugee youth." The project was funded by a grant from Elrha and published as a case study in the Elrha Research for Health in Humanitarian Crises series.

== Awards and honors ==
In recognition of her "excellence in the application of anthropology to the relief of poverty and distress, and to the active recognition of human dignity", Panter-Brick was awarded the 2011 Lucy Mair Medal by the Royal Anthropological Institute of Great Britain and Ireland. In 2014, Panter-Brick was the keynote speaker of a forum on parenting and human development hosted at the United Nations headquarters. She has also been a keynote speaker at the World Bank and World Health Organization.

From 2013 to 2022, Panter-Brick was a senior editor for the medical anthropology section of the journal Social Science & Medicine. Mark Eggerman – who is also Panter-Brick's husband – served as the section's associate editor during her editorship. (Note: Eggerman is also affiliated with Yale University; the two maintained a common email address for their role as the journal's medical anthropology editors.)

== Publications ==
Panter-Brick has published over 180 peer-reviewed articles and has authored or edited eight books, listed below:

- Callan H, Coleman S, eds. (2018). The International Encyclopedia of Anthropology. Wiley. doi:10.1002/9781118924396. (Note: Panter-Brick is an associate editor of The International Encyclopedia of Anthropology.)
- Abramowitz S, Panter-Brick C (2015). Medical Humanitarianism: Ethnographies of Practice. University of Pennsylvania Press. JSTOR j.ctt16xwb48. Project MUSE book 42200.
- Leckman J, Panter-Brick C, Salah R (2014). Pathways to Peace: The Transformative Power of Children and Families. MIT Press. doi:10.7551/mitpress/9780262027984.001.0001. ISBN 978-0-262-54921-9. JSTOR j.ctt1287hff.
- Panter-Brick C, Fuentes A (2010). Health, Risk, and Adversity. Berghahn Books. doi:10.1515/9781845458713. ISBN 978-1-84545-871-3. JSTOR j.ctt9qdbxg.
- Panter-Brick C, Layton RL, Rowley-Conwy P (2001). Hunter-Gatherers: An Interdisciplinary Perspective. Cambridge University Press. ISBN 978-0-521-77210-5.
- Panter-Brick C, Smith M (2000). Abandoned Children. Cambridge University Press. ISBN 978-0-521-77555-7.
- Panter-Brick C, Worthman CM (1999). Hormones, Health and Behavior: A Socio-ecological and Lifespan Perspective. Cambridge University Press. ISBN 978-0-521-10375-6.
- Panter-Brick C (1998). Biosocial Perspectives on Children. Cambridge University Press. ISBN 978-0-521-57595-9.
