= Prince A. Morrow =

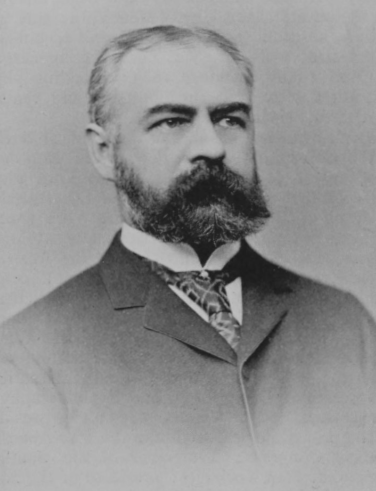
- Born: Prince Albert Morrow; December 19, 1846; Mount Vernon, Christian County, Kentucky
- Died: March 17, 1913 (aged 66); New York, New York
- Occupation(s): Physician, educator
- Spouse: Lucy Bibb Slaughter (m. 1874)
- Children: 6

Prince Albert Morrow (December 19, 1846 – March 17, 1913) was an American dermatologist, venereologist, social hygienist, and early campaigner for sex education.

== Biography ==
Prince A. Morrow was born in Mount Vernon, Christian County, Kentucky on December 19, 1846. He married Lucy Bibb Slaughter in 1874, and they had six children.

Morrow founded the Society of Sanitary and Moral Prophylaxis, the first Social Hygiene association in the United States, in New York City on February 9, 1905. In 1910, this organization joined with various other Social Hygiene association across the country to create the American Federation for Sex Hygiene with Morrow as president. During the 1890s, he opposed plans for the annexation of Hawaii on grounds its population had high rate of leprosy.

He died at his home in Manhattan on March 17, 1913.

== Works (partial list) ==
- Drug Eruptions: A Clinical Study on the Irritant Effects of Drugs upon the Skin (1887)
- Atlas of Skin and Venereal Diseases (1889)
- (ed.) A System of Genito-Urinary Diseases, Syphilology and Dermatology (1893)
- Social Diseases and Marriage (1904)

== See also ==
- Social hygiene movement
- Robert Latou Dickinson
- Maurice Bigelow
