= Sally Moore =

Sally Moore may refer to:

- Sally Moore (tennis) (born 1940), American tennis player
- Sally Falk Moore (1924–2021), American anthropologist
