= Syphilis and Marriage =

1880 book by Jean Alfred Fournier

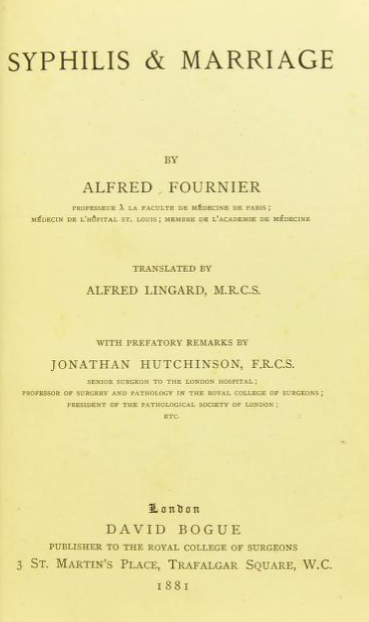
- Title page for Syphilis and Marriage (1881)
- Author: Jean Alfred Fournier
- Language: French
- Genre: Medicine
- Published: 1880
- Publication place: France

Syphilis and Marriage (1880) is a collection of lectures in a book by French physician Jean Alfred Fournier, in which he advocated marriage between a virgin man and woman as the only reliable means of preventing syphilis.

== Publication ==
Syphilis and Marriage was first published in French by Jean Alfred Fournier of the Hôpital Saint-Louis, Paris, in 1880.

In 1881 the book was translated into English by Prince A. Morrow, and that same year, an English translation was also produced by Alfred Lingard.

Syphilis and marriage - lectures delivered at the St. Louis Hospital, Paris, translated by Prince A. Morrow (1881)

== Content ==
In the book Fournier advocated marriage between a virgin man and woman as the only reliable means of preventing syphilis. He did not propose totally banning syphilitic men from marriage, but advised they wait about four years after symptoms first appeared before trying to have children. (Note: In the nineteenth century, doctors believed congenital syphilis, then called hereditary syphilis, was passed to the baby through the father's semen at conception. They thought the infected baby then passed the disease to the mother through the placenta, which explained why mothers often showed no symptoms until after giving birth. This theory was incorrect. Reliable tests for syphilis were not developed until 1906, and it was later discovered that treating a pregnant woman for syphilis could prevent the disease in her baby.)
