= Huxley Memorial Medal and Lecture =

Royal Anthropological Institute honour

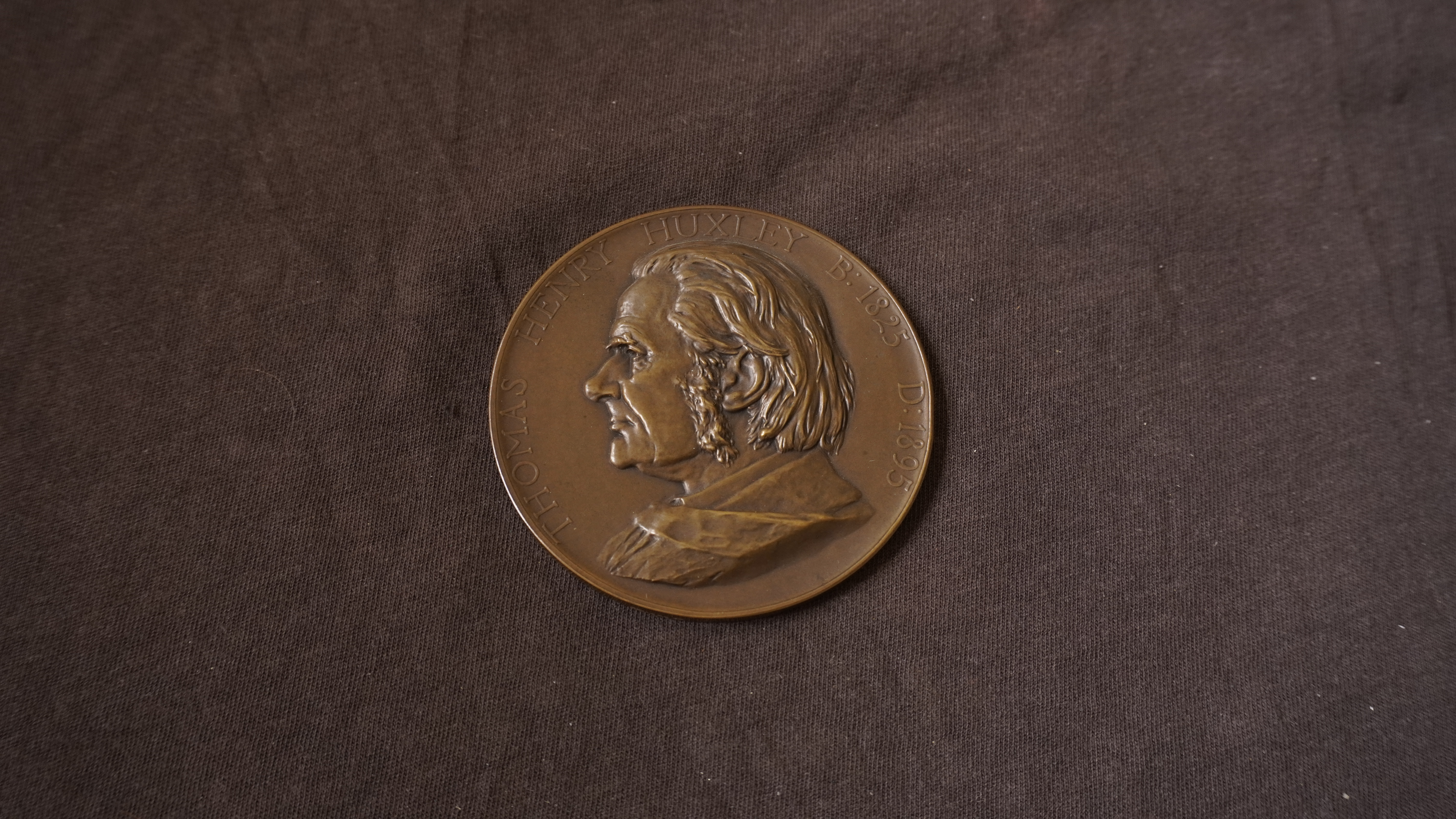
The Huxley memorial medallion in bronze created by Frank Boucher

The Huxley Memorial Medal and Lecture is a lecture and associated medal that was created in 1900 by the Royal Anthropological Institute of Great Britain and Ireland to honour the anthropologist Thomas Henry Huxley. The lecture and medal are awarded annually to any scientist who distinguishes themselves in any field of anthropological research. Thomas Huxley was fortunate to have another memorial lecture named his honour, The Huxley Lecture that was instituted by the members of Charing Cross Hospital Medical School in 1896.

Huxley had been a member of both the Ethnological Society of London (ESL) and the Anthropological Society of London since 1863, and he was President of the ESL during its last two years, and Vice President of the Institute when John Lubbock, Lord Avebury was President. A Huxley Lecture Committee was convened in May 1896, which decided that scientist should be invited to deliver a lecture to honour Huxley.

== Recipients ==
Year	Laureate	Nationality	Title	Date	Ref
1900	Lord Avebury	United Kingdom	"Huxley, the man and his work"	13 November 1900	
1901	Francis Galton	United Kingdom	"The possible improvement of the human breed under existing conditions of law and sentiment"	29 October 1901	
1902	Daniel John Cunningham	United Kingdom	"Right-handedness and left-brainedness"	28 October 1902	
1903	Karl Pearson	United Kingdom	"On the inheritance in man of mental and moral characters, and its relation to the inheritance of physical characters"	16 October 1903	
1904	Joseph Deniker	France	"The six races that make up the current population of Europe"	7 October 1904	
1905	John Beddoe	United Kingdom	"Colour and race"	31 October 1905	
1906	Flinders Petrie	United Kingdom	"Migrations"	1 November 1906"	
1907	Edward Burnett Tylor	United Kingdom	Awarded the Huxley medal on 5 November 1907	5 November 1907	
1908	William Z. Ripley	United States	"The European population of the United States"	13 November 1908	
1909	Gustaf Retzius	Sweden	"The so-called North European race of mankind: a review of and views on the development of some anthropological questions"	5 November 1909	
1910	William Boyd Dawkins	United Kingdom	"The arrival of man in Britain in the Pleistocene age"	22 November 1910	
1911	Felix von Luschan	Austrian Empire	"The early inhabitants of Western Asia"	23 November 1911	
1912	William Gowland	United Kingdom	"The metals in antiquity"	19 November 1912	
1913	William Johnson Sollas	United Kingdom	Paviland Cave: an Aurignacian station in Wales	14 November 1913	
1914	James George Frazer	United Kingdom	For the presentation of the Huxley medal		
1915	Émile Cartailhac	France	For the presentation of the Huxley medal		
1916	James George Frazer	United Kingdom	"Ancient stories of a great flood"	14 November 1916	
1917			No medal was given nor lecture held. Likely due to World War I		
1918			No mention of the lecture being held.		
1919			No mention of the lecture being held.		
1920	Alfred Cort Haddon	United Kingdom	"Migrations of cultures in British New Guinea"	23 November 1920	
1921	Henry Balfour	United Kingdom	"The archer's bow in the Homeric poems: an attempted diagnosis"	1 September 1921	
1922	Marcellin Boule	France	"L’oeuvre anthropologique du Prince Albert 1er de Monaco et les récents progrès de la Paléontologie humaine en France"	Never delivered	
1923	Edwin Sidney Hartland	United Kingdom	Hartland was awarded the Huxley Medal in 1922 but was not able to prepare and deliver the Huxley Memorial Lecture owing to his health		
1924	René Verneau	France	"La race de Néanderthal et la race de Grimaldi: leur rôle dans l’Humanité"	25 November 1924	
1925	Arthur John Evans	United Kingdom	"The early Nilotic, Libyan and Egyptian relations with Minoan Crete"	24 November 1925	
1926	William Ridgeway	United Kingdom	The death of William Ridgeway meant the Huxley Memorial Lecture was not delivered		
1927	Aleš Hrdlička	United States	"The Neanderthal phase of man"	Unknown	
1928	Arthur Keith	United Kingdom	"The evolution of the human races"	27 November 1928	
1929	Erland Nordenskiöld	Sweden	"The American Indian as an inventor"	26 November 1929	
1930	Archibald H. Sayce	United Kingdom	"The antiquity of civilized man"	18 November 1930	
1931	Georg Thilenius	Germany	"On some biological view-points in ethnology"	29 September 1931	
1932	Charles Gabriel Seligman	United Kingdom	"Anthropological perspective and psychological theory"	29 November 1932	
1933	John Linton Myres	United Kingdom	"The Cretan labyrinth: a retrospect of Aegean research"	28 November 1933	
1934	Marc Aurel Stein	United Kingdom	"The Indo-Iranian borderlands: their prehistory in the light of geography and of recent explorations"	31 July 1934	
1935	Grafton Elliot Smith	Australia	"The place of Thomas Henry Huxley in anthropology"	26 November 1935	
1936	Edward Westermarck	Finland	"Methods in social anthropology"	27 October 1936	
1937	Herbert John Fleure	United Kingdom	"Racial evolution and archaeology"	9 November 1937	
1938	Marcel Mauss	France	"Une catégorie de l’esprit humain: la notion de personne, celle de ‘moi’: un plan de travail"	29 November 1938	
1939	Robert Ranulph Marett	United Kingdom	"Charity and the struggle for existence"	28 November 1939	
1940	Harold John Edward Peake	United Kingdom	"The study of prehistoric times"	26 November 1940	
1941	Henri Breuil	France	"The discovery of the antiquity of man: some of the evidence"	16 April 1946	
1942	Charles Leonard Woolley	United Kingdom	"North Syria as a cultural link in the ancient world"	24 November 1942	
1943	Frederic Charles Bartlett	United Kingdom	"Anthropology in reconstruction"	23 November 1943	
1944	V. Gordon Childe	Australia	"Archaeological ages as technological stages"		
1945	Alfred Kroeber	United States	"The ancient Oikoumenê as an historic culture aggregate"		
1946	Gertrude Caton Thompson	United Kingdom	"The Aterian industry: its place and significance in the Palaeolithic world"	6 May 1946	
1947	Wynfrid Duckworth	United Kingdom	"Some complexities of human structure"	25 November 1947	
1948	Robert Lowie	United States	"Some aspects of political organization among the American aborigines"		
1949	James Hornell	United Kingdom	Died before delivery of lecture		
1950	Julian Huxley	United Kingdom	"New bottles for new wine: ideology and scientific knowledge"	28 November 1950	
1951	Alfred Radcliffe-Brown	United Kingdom	"The comparative method in social anthropology"		
1952	Peter Buck	New Zealand	Died before delivery of lecture		
1952	Kaj Birket-Smith	Denmark	"The history of ethnology in Denmark"		
1953	Morris Ginsberg	United Kingdom	"On the diversity of morals"	26 November 1953	
1954	Ralph Linton	United States	Died before delivery of lecture		
1954	Henri Victor Vallois	France	"Neanderthals and Praesapiens"	25 November 1954	
1955	Frederic Wood Jones	United Kingdom	Died before delivery of lecture		
1955	Robert Redfield	United States	"Societies and cultures as natural systems"	22 March 1955	
1956	J. B. S. Haldane	United Kingdom	"The argument from animals to men: an examination of its validity for anthropology"	29 November 1956	
1957	Sigvald Linné	Sweden	"Technical secrets of American Indians"	28 November 1957	
1958	Wilfrid Le Gros Clark	United Kingdom	"Bones of contention"	28 November 1957	
1959	Raymond Firth	New Zealand	"Problem and assumption in an anthropological study of religion"		
1960	Samuel Kirkland Lothrop	United States	"Early migration to central and south America"	25 November 1960	
1961	Arthur Mourant	United Kingdom	"Evolution, genetics and anthropology"	24 November 1961	
1962	Dorothy Garrod	United Kingdom	"The middle Palaeolithic of the near east and the problem of Mount Carmel man"	2 November 1962	
1963	E. E. Evans-Pritchard	United Kingdom	"The Zande state"	27 June 1963	
1964	Gustav Heinrich Ralph von Koenigswald	West Germany	"Early man facts and fantasy"	2 April 1964	
1965	Claude Lévi-Strauss	France	"The future of kinship studies"		
1966	J. Eric S. Thompson	United Kingdom	"The Maya central area at the Spanish Conquest and later: a problem in demography"		
1967	Sherwood Washburn	United States	"Behaviour and the origin of man"		
1968	Georges Henri Rivière	France	"My experience at the Musée d’Ethnologie"		
1969	Isaac Schapera	United Kingdom	"The crime of sorcery"		
1970	Daryll Forde	United Kingdom	"Ecology and social structure"		
1971	George Murdock	United States	"Anthropology’s mythology"		
1972	Luigi Luca Cavalli-Sforza	Italy	"Origin and differentiation of human races"		
1973	Klaus Wachsmann	United Kingdom	"Spencer to Hood: a changing view of non-European music"		
1974	J. Desmond Clark	United Kingdom	"Africa in prehistory: peripheral or paramount?"	7 November 1974	
1975	Gerardo Reichel-Dolmatoff	Austria	"Cosmology as ecological analysis: a view from the rain forest"	27 November 1975	
1976	M. N. Srinivas	India	"The changing position of Indian women"	25 November 1976	
1977	Meyer Fortes	South Africa	"Sacrifice, or was your fieldwork really necessary?"	unknown	
1978	Joseph Weiner	United Kingdom	"Beyond physical anthropology"	8 November 1978	
1979	Gordon Willey	United States	"Towards a holistic view of ancient Maya civilizations"	7 November 1979	
1980	Edmund Leach	United Kingdom	"Why did Moses have a sister?"	21 November 1980	
1981	Fei Hsiao-Tung	China	"Some observations on the transformation of rural China"	18 November 1981	
1982	Paul Thornell Baker	United States	"Adaptive limits of human populations"	17 November 1982	
1983	Clifford Geertz	United States	"Culture and change: the indonesian case"	1 February 1983	
1984	Junichiro Itani	Japan	"The evolution of primate social structure"	21 November 1984	
1985	Louis Dumont	France	"Are cultures living beings? German identity in interaction"	14 November 1985	
1986	Lewis Binford	United States	"Data, relativism and archaeological science: looking at, thinking about and inferring the past"	17 September 1986	
1987	G. Ainsworth Harrison	United Kingdom	"Social heterogeneity and biological variation"	18 November 1987	
1988	Daniel Carleton Gajdusek	United States	"New plagues - old scourges: epidemics of brain disease in population isolates in the twentieth century"	2 November 1988	
1989	Fredrik Barth	Norway	"Transmission, and the shaping of culture in Asia and Melanesia"	22 November 1989	
1990	Robert Hinde	United Kingdom	"A biologist looks at anthropology"	21 November 1990	
1991	Colin Renfrew	United Kingdom	"Archaeology, genetics and linguistic diversity: a new synthesis?"	27 November 1991	
1992	Mary Douglas	United Kingdom	Balaam's Place in the Book of Numbers	18 November 1992	
1993	George W. Stocking Jr.	United States	Reading the palimpsest of enquiry: Notes and Queries and the history of social anthropology	16 February 1993	
1994	Sidney W. Mintz	United States	Enduring substances and trying theories: the Caribbean region as Oikumenê	7 December 1994	
1995	Jack Goody	United Kingdom	A kernel of doubt: agnosticism in cultural and cross-cultural perspective	6 December 1995	
1996	Phillip Tobias	South Africa	The ape-like Australopithecus after 70 years: was it hominid?	27 November 1996	
1997	Stanley Tambiah	United States	Transnational movements, multiculturalism and ethnonationalism	18 November 1997	
1998	Marshall Sahlins	United States	Two or three things that I know about culture	18 November 1998	
1999	Sally Falk Moore	United States	Certainties undone: fifty turbulent years of legal anthropology, 1949-1999	27 October 1999	
2000	Pierre Bourdieu	France	Participant objectivation: breaching the boundary between anthropology and sociology – how?	6 December 2000	
2001	John Francis Marchment Middleton	United Kingdom	Merchants: An Essay in Historical Ethnography	14 November 2001	
2002	Jane Goodall	United Kingdom	The scientific study of primates and its impact on contemporary world-views	4 December 2002	
2003	Gananath Obeyesekere	United States	Cannibal talk: dialogical misunderstandings in the south seas	15 July 2003	
2004	Marilyn Strathern	United Kingdom	A Community of Critics? Thoughts on New Knowledge	8 December 2004	
2005	Peter Ucko	United Kingdom	Forms such as never were in nature: forging authenticity	7 December 2005	
2006	Leslie Aiello	United States	Diet, energy and human evolution	7 December 2006	
2007	Adam Kuper	South Africa	Changing the subject – about cousin marriage, among other thing	14 December 2007	
2008	Maurice Godelier	France	Community, society, culture: three keys to understanding today’s conflicted identities	7 November 2008	
2009	Ian Hodder	United Kingdom	Human-thing entanglement: towards an integrated archaeological perspective		
2010	Johannes Fabian	Netherlands	Cultural anthropology and the question of knowledge	4 February 2010	
2011	Bruce Kapferer	Australia	How Anthropologists Think: Refiguring the Exotic	16 December 2011	
2012	Alan Macfarlane	United Kingdom	Anthropology, Empire and Modernity	14 December 2012	
2013	Howard Morphy	United Kingdom	Extended Lives in Global Spaces: The Anthropology of Yolngu Pre Burial Ceremonies		
2014	Tim Ingold	United Kingdom	On Human Correspondence	7 November 2014	
2015	Robin Dunbar	United Kingdom	Dunbar's number(s): constraints on the social world		
2016	Margaret Lock	Canada	Mutable Environments and the Permeable Human Body	11 November 2016	
2017	Margaret Conkey	United States	Field Walking, Walking the Field: Anthropological Archaeology as Viewed from Deep Time		
2018	Anna Tsing	United States	Feral Atlas:The More-than-Human Anthropocene	29 November 2018	
2019	Chris Hann	United Kingdom	Economy and Ethics in the Cosmic Process	18 December 2019	
2020	Stephen Levinson	United Kingdom	The ‘interaction engine’: the evolution of the infrastructure for language	14 December 2020	
2021	Stephen Shennan	United Kingdom	Population and the dynamics of culture change	14 December 2021	
2022	Marcia Langton	No lecture			
2023	Chris Stringer	United Kingdom	Mostly Out of Africa: how, when and where	8 November 2023	
2024	Alex de Waal	United Kingdom			
2025	Didier Fassin				
