= Cedric Carter =

British medical geneticist (1917–1984)

- Born: Cedric Oswald Carter; 26 September 1917; Port Said
- Died: 12 March 1984 (aged 66); Keston, Kent
- Education: Winchester College; The Queen's College, Oxford; St Thomas's Hospital Medical School
- Scientific career
- Fields: Human genetics
- Institutions: University of London

Cedric Oswald Carter (26 September 1917 – 12 March 1984) was a British medical geneticist and eugenicist. According to Peter Harper, Carter was "probably the single person who most influenced the development of medical genetics as a clinical specialty" during the late 1960s and 1970s.

== Early life and education ==
The son of a Royal Navy captain, Carter was born in Port Said in present-day Egypt on 26 September 1917. He was educated in England, specifically at Winchester College, Queen's College, Oxford, and St Thomas's Hospital Medical School. After graduating, he served as a medical officer in the 8th Indian Division of the British Indian Army, where he eventually became a major before leaving the Army in 1946. He then resumed his medical training and achieved his Membership of the Royal Colleges of Physicians of the United Kingdom (MRCP) in 1948.

== Career ==
From 1948 to 1951, Carter was a research fellow at the Great Ormond Street Hospital (then known as the Hospital for Sick Children) in London, England. During the following four years, he was a part-time research fellow in genetics at the same hospital, as well as a part-time secretary for the Eugenics Society. He served as editor of the Eugenics Review from 1950 to 1952 and as secretary of the Eugenics Society from 1952 to 1957. He joined the Medical Research Council’s Clinical Genetics Unit at the Institute of Child Health, London as a staff member in 1957, and succeeded John Alexander Fraser Roberts as the Unit's director in 1964, remaining in this role until his retirement in 1982. He founded the Clinical Genetics Society in 1970 and served as its first president. He became professor of clinical genetics at the University of London in 1975, also holding this position until his retirement. He served as president of the Eugenics Society from 1972 to 1976.

== Recognition ==
Carter was elected a Fellow of the Royal College of Physicians in 1964 and received a gold medal for his services to pediatrics from the Children's Hospital of Philadelphia in 1971. He was named Galton Lecturer by the Eugenics Society in 1971 and Darwin Lecturer by the same society in 1978, and was named an honorary fellow of the Japanese Society of Human Genetics in 1980. The Clinical Genetics Society honoured Carter by establishing the annual Carter Medal and Carter Lecture.

== Personal life and death ==
Carter married Peggy Hope, who had worked at St Thomas' Hospital as a nurse. The couple had seven children and twenty-nine grandchildren. Carter died "suddenly and unexpectedly" on 12 March 1984, at his home in Keston, Kent, England.
