= Necklace of Venus =

- Other names: Venereal necklace, collar of Venus, leucoderma syphiliticum
- Specialty: Dermatology
- Causes: Syphilis

Necklace of Venus describes the white spots on the side of the neck associated with syphilis.

It is a type of leucoderma syphiliticum, appearing around six-months following the onset of syphilis.

It is rare. The term was coined by Jean Alfred Fournier in 1906.

== See also ==
- List of cutaneous conditions
