= American Sexual Health Association =

American non-profit organization

- Abbreviation: ASHA
- Formation: 1914
- Type: NGO
- Purpose: Information and treatment for sexually transmitted diseases (STDS)
- Region served: United States
- Website: www.ashasexualhealth.org

The American Sexual Health Association (ASHA), formally known as the American Social Hygiene Association and the American Social Health Association, is an American nonprofit organization established in 1914, that cites a mission to improve the health of individuals, families, and communities, with an emphasis on sexual health, as well as a focus on preventing sexually transmitted infections and their harmful consequences. ASHA uses tools such as education, communication, advocacy and policy analysis activities with the intent to heighten public, patient, provider, policymaker and media awareness of STI prevention, screening, diagnosis and treatment strategies.

== History ==
In 1913, at a conference in Buffalo, New York, with the advice of John D. Rockefeller Jr., two social hygiene associations, the American Vigilance Association and the American Federation for Sex Hygiene, dedicated to fighting prostitution and venereal disease (VD), joined to form the American Social Hygiene Association. In 1914, ASHA established its national headquarters in New York City. Founders and supporters included Charles Eliot, president of Harvard University; Jane Addams of Chicago's Hull House; Edward Keyes Jr., M.D.; Dr. Thomas N. Hepburn, leader of the Connecticut social hygiene movement; Grace Dodge, philanthropist; John D. Rockefeller Jr., initial financial contributor; and Dr. William Freeman Snow, Stanford University professor and secretary of the California State Board of Health.

=== World War I ===
ASHA's early work focused on education and awareness efforts within the armed forces. ASHA worked with the US War Department during World War I when VD occurrences surged among soldiers. Their efforts included educating soldiers about venereal diseases and their transmission and attempting to eliminate prostitution, which was believed to be the primary vehicle for VD transmission among the armed forces. ASHA was successful in shutting down many of the prostitution rings that traditionally surrounded military bases. Due to its contribution to the war effort, ASHA gained national attention and succeeded in creating public awareness of VD.

=== Between the wars ===
During the 1920s, ASHA served as a central coordinator for the local or regional committees, doctors, public health officials, and social welfare agencies that were combating sexually transmitted infections. In addition, ASHA published the Journal of Social Hygiene and the Social Hygiene Bulletin, conducted studies on the prevalence of syphilis, undertook surveys on VD, published synopses of laws concerning prostitution, and supported legislation that required a premarital exam for syphilis. The program also promoted character and sex education as a means of preventing the spread of STIs. The ASHA educational program emphasized preparation for a wholesome family life, avoiding VD, and physical as well as moral fitness.

ASHA had developed into a mature organization by the 1930s with an effective network of supporting local organizations. ASHA also was involved in cooperative projects with a variety of organizations. In a single year, ASHA collaborated with the Federal Council of Churches and the National Congress of Parents and Teachers to promote sex education programs and materials; provided leadership for efforts by the White House Conference on Child Health and Protection to consider the social hygiene elements of child health; conducted institutes for public health nurses under the auspices of the National Organization of Public Health Nursing; and provided data to the U.S. Bureau of Indian Affairs in preparation for Indian Health Programs.

=== World War II ===
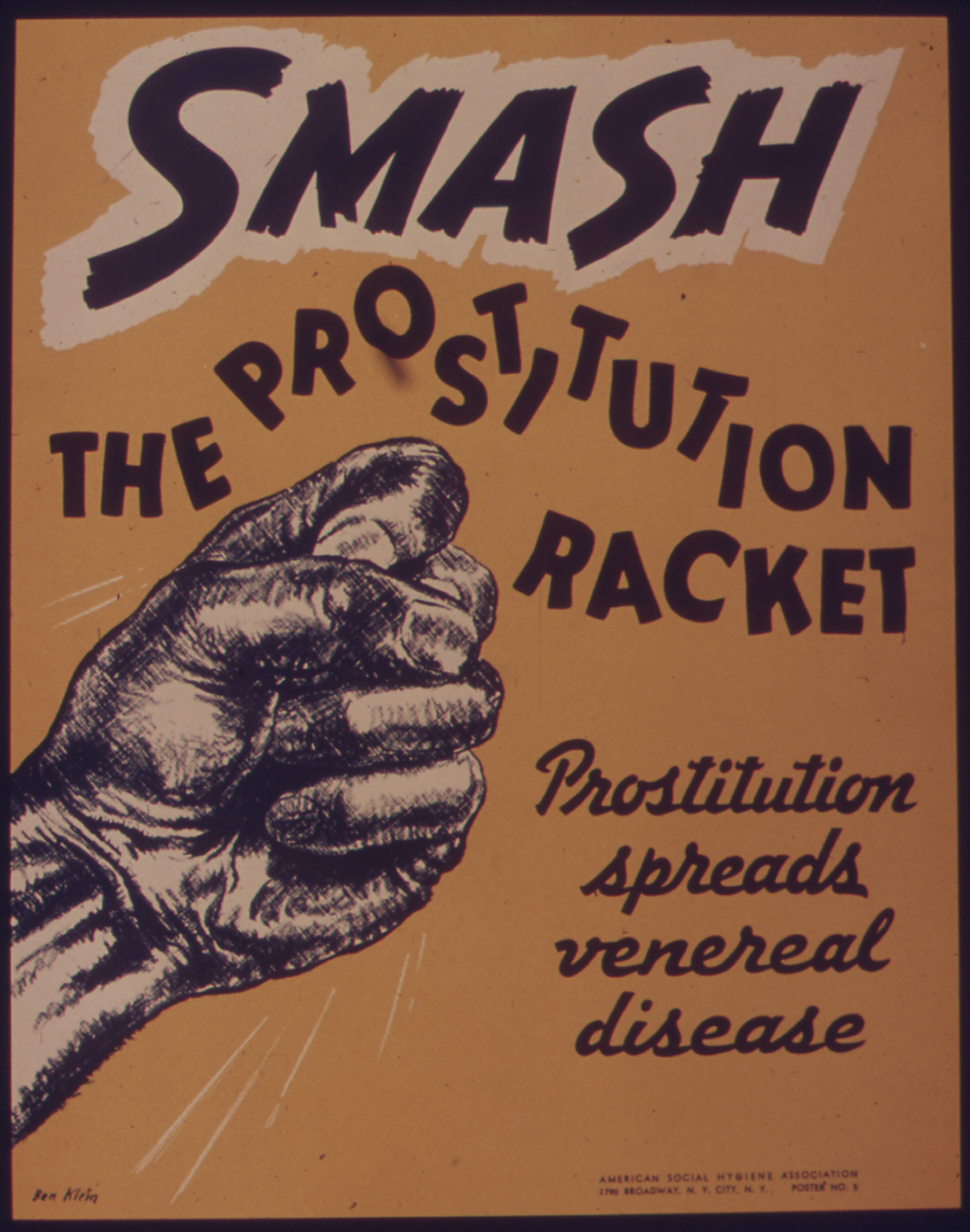
American Social Health Association World War II poster

During World War II, ASHA fulfilled a role reminiscent of its work during World War I, serving on the VD Coordinating Committee for the US military and working against prostitution. ASHA's efforts contributed to a 50% drop in VD infection rates in the military during the first years of the war. In 1944, the military began using penicillin as a cure for syphilis and by the late 1950s it was believed that syphilis was no longer a serious health threat. As a result, the Journal of Social Hygiene discontinued publication.

==== Negro Project ====
During World War II, ASHA launched the Negro Project, also known as the Negro Venereal Disease Education Project. The aim of this project was to address the presence of venereal diseases among African Americans using pamphlets, posters, and motion pictures specifically aimed at the African American community.

In 1942 a proposal was sent to prospective funding agencies. The proposal emphasized two main aspects of the Negro Project, “that the higher rate of prevalence of venereal diseases among the black population was alarming; and two, that this higher prevalence rate was not the fault of the black community.” After being rejected by private funding organizations, the project found support from the Social Protection Division of the Federal Security Agency.

In November 1943, in New York City, the Negro Project held the National Conference on Wartime Problems in Venereal Disease Control. After the national conference in 1943, project officials held meetings at regional level, predominantly in Southern states. However, in 1945 documentation of the project ceased. The Social Protection Division of the Federal Security Agency was dissolved in the 1940s, which may have led to funds for the project disappearing, causing the project to end.

=== Kinsey era ===
The release of the Kinsey reports on sexual behavior in 1948 and 1953 created national controversy. ASHA played a prominent role in the debate, organizing a national conference to bring together leading authorities in the fields of psychology, statistics, education, medicine, law, religion, anthropology and sociology to exchange views as to the significance of Kinsey's new information. The goal was to look at the information as scientific data instead of pornography. As Walter Clark, ASHA president from 1937 to 1951, commented, "The truth never harms ... And it seems reasonable to hope that when today's older generation, conditioned against frankness in sex matters, passes away and today's youth takes over tomorrow's world, the truth about sex shall indeed make them free—free of the diseases, the exploitations, the ignorance and superstitions which for ages have burdened and blighted society."

Also in the 1950s, ASHA began to distribute a comprehensive annual questionnaire to health officers across the country. The responses, tabulated by ASHA and analyzed by the Centers for Disease Control and Prevention, were published annually as Today's VD Control Problem, continuing under ASHA auspices until 1975. Today's VD Control Problem provided the statistical basis for testimony before Congress, as ASHA returned year after year to urge adequate federal appropriations for STD control.

=== The 1960s and 1970s ===
As ASHA began to recognize that the STD issue connected with other issues, it reflected its broader approach in a name change, moving from American Social Hygiene Association to American Social Health Association in 1960. Among the issues of concern identified by ASHA was the link between STDs and drug use. In 1961 ASHA launched a new program that was the first to focus on the prevention of narcotic addiction and the treatment and rehabilitation of drug addicts. The agency evaluated existing programs, issued position papers and informational booklets, maintained a clearinghouse, and sponsored four community-based pilot projects.

By the 1970s, though, additional novel problems led to soaring STD rates, including the sexual revolution, more international travel, gay liberation, birth control for women, and increasing drug use. Scientists were also recognizing more sexually transmitted pathogens, and viral STDs were making an appearance as well, from herpes simplex virus (HSV) to human papillomavirus (HPV). ASHA's public outreach efforts in this era included the creation of the Herpes Resource Center in 1979, the first program in the U.S. for people living with a viral STD. ASHA also established the National VD Hotline, where trained volunteers offers scientifically accurate information and support. ASHA also launched its first modern public awareness campaign, VD is For Everybody. Working with the National Advertising Council, ASHA called attention to the alarming increase in the number of STDs by means of radio, television, and print public service announcements.

During the 1980s, ASHA continued to educate the public about sexually transmitted infections, primarily by means of telephone information and referral hot-lines, such as the National STD Hotline and the National AIDS Hotline. ASHA established the latter hotline in 1986, at that time the largest health-related hotline in the world. By the 1990s, the hotline was answering more than 1.5 million calls per year. The association also continued to advocate for public policies to combat STDS and increased funding for research. The identification of the AIDS virus added a new area of concern to the association's fight against sexually transmitted infections.

== ASHA Today ==
ASHA continues its mission to improve the health of improving the health of individuals, families and communities with a focus on preventing sexually transmitted diseases and their harmful consequences, and has broadened its efforts into the field of sexual health. Its current programs include:

STI Resource Center, which provides information, materials and referrals to the public who have questions or concerns about sexually transmitted infections. Through its telephone hotline and online message boards, the Center answers questions on such topics as transmission, risk reduction, prevention, testing, and treatment and partner communication.

Herpes Resource Center, founded in 1979, continues to provide information and support through its multiple web pages, message board and publications. The center also offers The Helper, a quarterly journal that discusses the latest in herpes information, research, treatment, testing and patient-advocacy.

HPV and Cervical Cancer Prevention Resource Center, established in 1991, offers information and referrals about the human papillomavirus to patients, health care providers, and policy makers. The HPV Resource Center focuses on issues including HPV vaccines, partner communication and cervical cancer screening. The Center also offers a bimonthly electronic journal, HPV News, that covers the latest in HPV research, treatment and testing options, and policy issues.

ASHA's Research division conducts numerous research projects among local, regional, and national constituents focusing on a variety of populations and an assortment of health topics including sexually transmitted infections. ASHA's Washington staff works to educate members of Congress and other important voices in health policy about the urgency of research and frontline programs in the STI field.

Advocacy: ASHA has maintained a policy office in Washington, DC, and has worked in partnership with other organizations in the area of sexual and reproductive health to advocate for proper attention and funding to STD research and programs.

National Cervical Cancer Coalition: NCCC became an ASHA program in the fall of 2011. Founded as a grass-roots organization in 1996, NCCC supports cervical cancer patients/survivors, families, and caregivers. NCCC has chapters across the U.S.

== ASHA milestones ==
Are the following:

- 1914 American Social Hygiene Association was founded
- 1920s John D. Rockefeller Jr. commits funds to support ASHA's mission
- 1927 ASHA establishes the Valentine's Day Committee to promote sexual responsibility
- 1931 Trains field and send them to uncover commercial houses of prostitution, ASHA's leader, Thomas Parran Jr., is appointed Surgeon General by FDR
- 1934 CBS cancels a radio address by Parran, New York Commissioner of Health, because the script includes the word "syphilis"
- 1937 ASHA established First National Social Hygiene Day
- 1938 Eleanor Roosevelt attends ASHA's annual luncheon in honor of the passage of Venereal Disease Control Act
- 1943 Perception shifts from moral to medical interventions to solve the VD problem
- 1945 Joe Louis joins ASHA for a major public awareness campaign
- 1954 ASHA begins to monitor rates of venereal disease by collecting data that was then analyzed by the Center for Disease Control and Prevention "Today's VD Control Problem" published by ASHA until 1970. ASHA testifies before Congress, as it continues to do today, to urge adequate federal appropriations for VD control.
- 1959 ASHA changes its name to the American Social Health Association
- 1970s Dramatic rise in sexually transmitted infection rates because of international travel, the sexual revolution, gay liberation and increasing drug use. Scientists recognizing more and more sexually transmitted pathogens. Genital herpes, human Papillomavirus (HPV), hepatitis B identified.
- 1979 ASHA creates the National Herpes Resource Center, which includes the National Herpes Hotline
- 1986 ASHA opens the National AIDS Hotline, the largest health-related hotline in the world
- 1999 ASHA opens the National HPV and Cervical Cancer Prevention Resource Center with hotline
- 2011 ASHA merges with the National Cervical Cancer Coalition (NCCC) in October NCCC becomes a program of ASHA and expands ASHA's reach to include cervical cancer survivors.
- 2012 ASHA changes its name to the American Sexual Health Association

== See also ==
- Progressive Era § Social hygiene movement
- Maurice Bigelow
- Reproductive health
- Social hygiene movement
