= Maurice Bigelow =

American sex educator

Maurice Alpheus Bigelow (December 8, 1872 in Milford Center, Ohio,-1955) was an American social hygienist, early sex-educator and eugenicist. He received his Ph.D. from Harvard University in 1901. He served as president of the American Eugenics Society from 1940 until 1945, as director of the School of Practical Arts at Columbia University Teacher’s College and was affiliated with the American Federation for Sex Hygiene.

His mother was Hattie R. Bigelow (July 5, 1852 – June 27, 1937), and his father was Alpheus Bigelow.

== See also ==
- Social hygiene movement
- Robert Latou Dickinson
