= Augustin Grisolle =

French physician

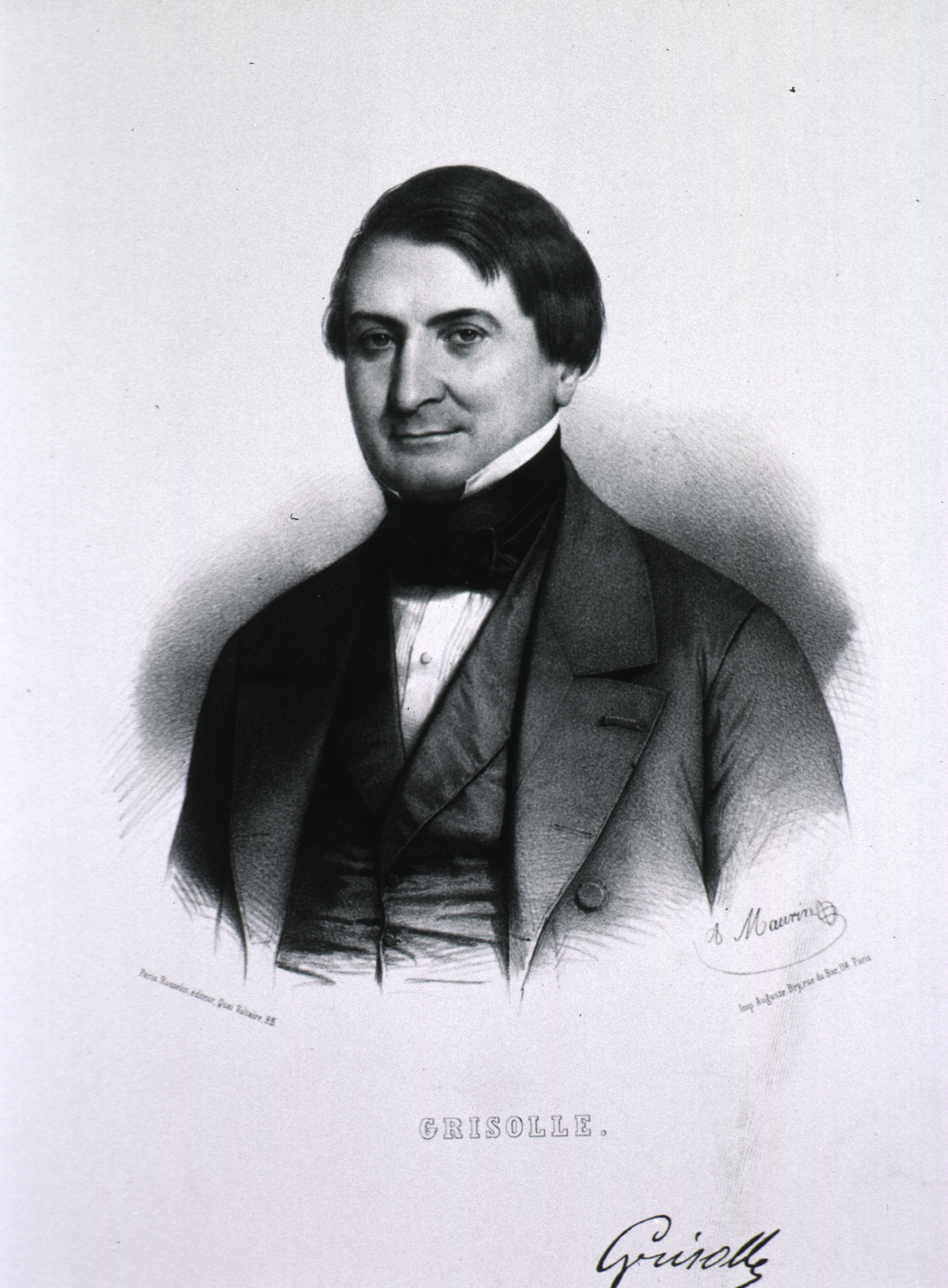
- Born: 10 February 1811; Fréjus
- Died: 9 February 1869 (aged 57)
- Occupation: Physician

Augustin Grisolle (10 February 1811 – 9 February 1869) was a French medical doctor born in Fréjus.

Grisolle was a professor at the Paris faculty of medicine and a member of the Académie de Médecine. He was the author of the two-volume "Traité élémentaire et pratique de pathologie interne" (1844).

His name is associated with "Grisolle's sign", an obsolete sign once affiliated with smallpox. It involved feeling the presence of papules when the skin is stretched.

== Biography ==
He presented a thesis entitled Essay on Lead Colic at the University of Paris Faculty of Medicine on July 10, 1835.

He was a student of Auguste François Chomel. After passing the agrégation exam in 1844, he went on to teach at the Paris Faculty of Medicine (chair of therapeutics and medical science) from 1853 to 1864. He became a member of the Académie nationale de médecine in 1844.

He then became chair of clinical medicine at the Hôtel-Dieu hospital in Paris from 1864 to 1869. From 1867 onwards, he taught Jean Alfred Fournier.

He is known for his Treatise on Pneumonia (1841) and his Elementary Treatise on Internal Pathology (1844), both of which have been reprinted several times. His name is associated with the “Grisolle sign”: “If you pinch the measles papule between two fingers, it disappears because it is soft and elastic, which is not the case with the Smallpox papule, which, although less apparent, is harder and more noticeable to the touch.” This sign has become obsolete.

He is buried in the Père Lachaise Cemetery (68th division).

== Selected writings ==
- Mémoire sur la pneumonie, 1836 (Treatise on pneumonia).
- Histoire des tumeurs phlegmoneuses des fosses iliaques, 1839 (History of phlegmonous iliac fossa tumors).
- Traité élémentaire et pratique de pathologie interne, 1844 (Treatise on internal pathology); seventh edition 1857.
- Discours prononcé au nom de la Faculté de médecine de Paris le 12 avril 1858 sur la tombe de M. Chomel 1858 (Speech on behalf of the Faculty of Medicine in Paris on April 12, 1858, at the grave of Auguste François Chomel 1788–1858).

== Bibliography ==
- Faj-Rues de Frejus Biographical Information (French)
- Eponyms & Syndromes, Dermatology Facts
