= The Huxley Lecture =

Charing Cross Hospital memorial lecture

The Huxley Lecture was a memorial lecture instituted by Charing Cross Hospital Medical School in 1896 to honour Thomas Henry Huxley and is delivered biennially. The Huxley Lecture was one of two memorial lectures created to honour Huxley. The other lecture series is known as The Huxley Memorial Medal and Lecture and was created in 1900 by the Royal Anthropological Institute of Great Britain and Ireland.

== Recipients ==
Year	Name	Rationale or Title	Date	Ref
1896	Michael Foster	"Recent Advances in Science and Their Bearing on Medicine and Surgery"	5 October 1896	
1898	Rudolf Virchow	"The Huxley Lecture of Recent Advances in Science and Their Bearing on Medicine and Surgery"	3 October 1898	
1900	Joseph Lister	"The Huxley Lecture"	2 October 1900	
1902	William H. Welch	"On recent studies of immunity with special reference to their bearing on pathology"	1 October 1902	
1904	William Macewen	"The Huxley Lecture on the Function of the Caecum and Appendix"	3 October 1904	
1906	Ivan Pavlov	"Recent Advances in Science and Their Bearing on Medicine and Surgery"	6 October 1906	
1908	Patrick Manson	"The Huxley Lecture on Recent Advances in Science and Their Bearing on. Medicine and Surgery"	3 October 1908	
1910	Frederick Walker Mott	"Hereditary Aspects Of Nervous And Mental Diseases"	8 October 1910	
1911	Henri Bergson	"Life and Consciousness"	29 May 1911	
1912	Simon Flexner	"On some problems in infection and its control"	31 October 1912	
1914	Ronald Ross	"Malaria and the transmission of diseases"	2 November 1914	
1920	Frederick Gowland Hopkins	"The Huxley Lecture on Recent Advances in Science and Their Bearing on. Medicine and Surgery"	24 November 1920	
1927	Archibald Garrod	"The Huxley lecture on Diathesis"	24 November 1927	
1929	Humphry Rolleston	"The Huxley Lecture on the nature of disease"	12 February 1929	
1935	Thomas Lewis	"The Huxley Lecture on clinical science within the university"	14 March 1935	
1937	Edgar Adrian	"Huxley, the Brain and the Mind"	18 November 1937	
