= John Francis Marchment Middleton =

British anthropologist (1921–2009)

John Francis Marchmant Middleton (22 May 1921 – 27 February 2009) was a British professor of anthropology in the United States, specializing in Africa. He was director of the International African Institute in 1973-74 and in 1980–81. His work on the Lugbara religion is considered a classic of African anthropology.

== Biography ==
Middleton was born and grew up in London, England. He received his bachelor of arts degree from the University of London in 1941. After World War II he returned to school and received his Bachelor of Science degree from Oxford University in 1949, and a doctorate in anthropology in 1953, also from Oxford. Middleton did his field work for his Ph.D. with the Lugbara in Uganda, beginning in 1949.

From 1953 to 1954, Middleton was a lecturer in anthropology at the University of London. From 1954 to 1956, he was a senior lecturer at the University of Cape Town, South Africa. In 1956, he returned to the University of London where he taught until 1963, during fieldwork in Zanzibar in 1958. From 1963 to 1966, he was a professor at Northwestern University in Evanston, Illinois, and he did fieldwork in Nigeria. In 1966 he started teaching at New York University, but that year he was offered a professorship at Yale University, which he accepted, so for a while he taught at both institutions. In 1972, Middleton left Yale to accept appointment as professor of African anthropology at the School of Oriental and African Studies at the University of London. This also enabled him to resume fieldwork, which he did in 1976 and 1977 in Ghana. In 1981, he returned to Yale, doing fieldwork in Kenya in 1986. Middleton continued to teach at Yale as a professor emeritus until his death in 2009.

During his long career, he was a visiting professor at the University of Virginia, the University of Oregon, University of Lagos in Nigeria, and the École pratique des hautes études in Paris. He was editor in chief of the Encyclopedia of Africa South of the Sahara (1997) and of the expanded New Encyclopedia of Africa (2007).

Middleton died on Friday, 27 February 2009, at the Yale-New Haven Hospital of head trauma after falling from a seizure two weeks before.

== Awards ==
- 2001 Thomas Henry Huxley Memorial Medal by the Royal Anthropological Institute
- 2007 Distinguished Africanist Award by the African Studies Association

== Selected works ==
- 1953 The Central Tribes of the North-Eastern Bantu; the Kikuyu, including Embu, Meru, Mbere, Chuka, Mwimbi, Tharaka, and the Kamba of Kenya, London: International African Institute, OCLC 3416265
- 1960 Lugbara religion; ritual and authority among an East African people International African Institute, Oxford University Press, London OCLC 361464
- 1961 Land Tenure in Zanzibar, London: H.M. Stationery Office, OCLC 4170330
- 1965 The Lugbara of Uganda, New York: Holt, Rinehart and Winston, OCLC 492118
- 1992 The World of the Swahili: An African Mercantile Civilization, New Haven: Yale University Press, ISBN 0-300-05219-7
- 2000 The Swahili: The Social Landscape of a Mercantile Society, Blackwell Publishers, ISBN 978-0-631-18919-0 (co-written with Mark Horton)
