= Morse College =

Residential college at Yale University

- Residential college at Yale University
- Yale University
- Coat of arms of Morse College
- Location: 304 York Street
- Coordinates: 41.3126°N 72.9305°W
- Motto: In Deo Non Armis Fido (Latin)
- Motto in English: In God, not arms, I trust (Samuel F.B. Morse family motto)
- Established: 1961
- Named for: Samuel Morse
- Colors: Black, white, red
- Sister college: Mather House, Harvard
- Head: Hwansoo Kim
- Dean: Blake Ellison Trimble
- Undergraduates: 471 (2013–2014)
- Mascot: Walrus
- Website: morse.yalecollege.yale.edu

Morse College is one of the fourteen residential colleges at Yale University, built in 1961 and designed by Eero Saarinen. It is adjacent to Ezra Stiles College and the two colleges share many facilities. The current Head of College is Hwansoo Kim. The Associate Head of College is Sumi Kim. Blake Trimble is the Dean of Morse College.

== Origin ==
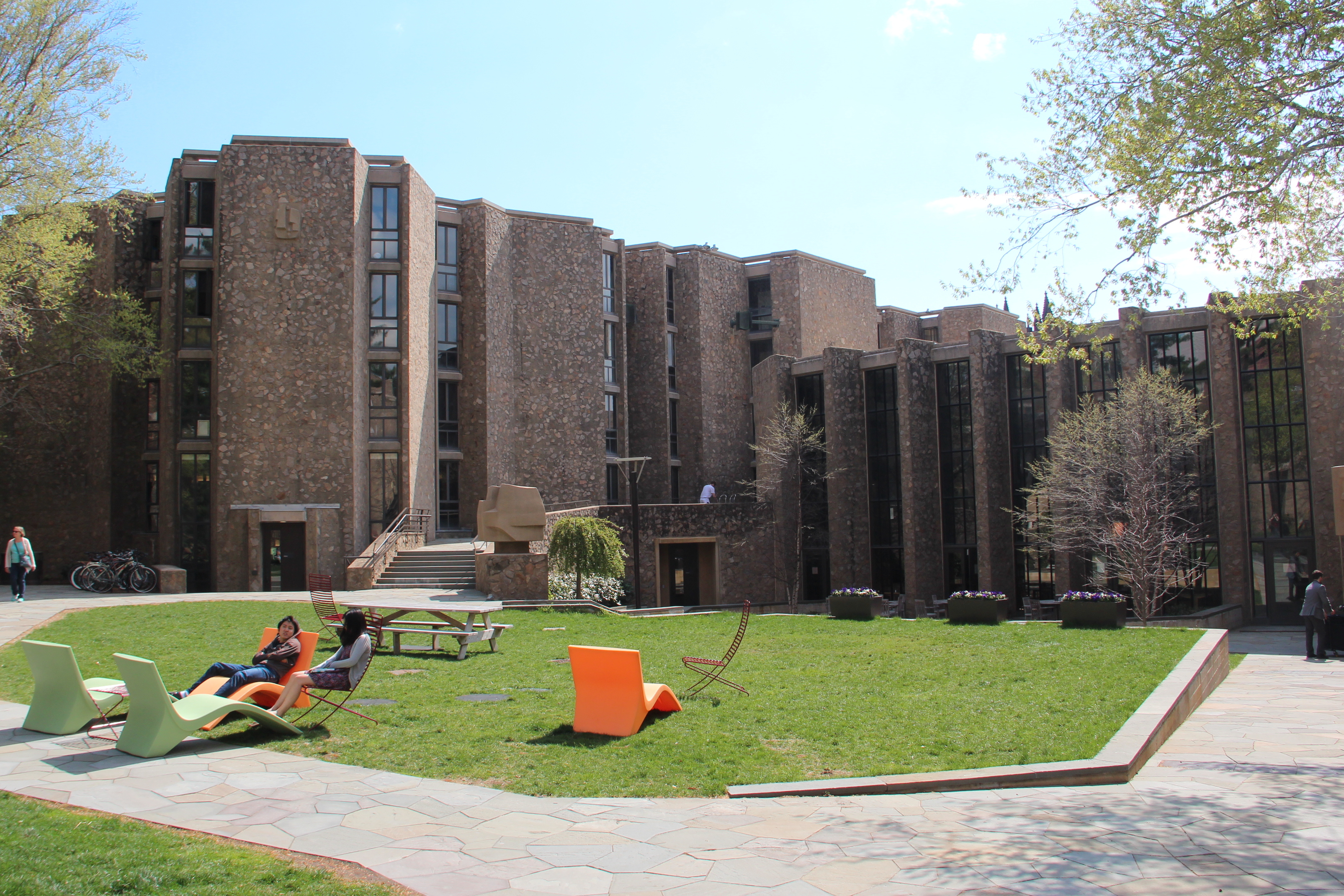
Morse College courtyard

In his report on the year 1955–56, Yale President A. Whitney Griswold announced his intention to add at least one more residential college to the system Yale had launched only two decades earlier. "We have the colleges so full that community life, discipline, education, even sanitation are suffering," he stated. This news bred wild rumors about four or five new colleges being added to Yale's system. Nothing substantial was announced until the spring of 1959 when Eero Saarinen '34 was chosen as the architect, and the Old York Square behind the Graduate School became the designated site. New Haven high schools, Boardman Manual Training School and Hillhouse High School were demolished to make way for the colleges.

The Old Dominion Foundation, established by Paul Mellon '29, provided money to build two "radically different" colleges, which would alleviate the growing strain on the older colleges. Mellon's gift of $15 million led to the development of Morse and its adjacent college, Ezra Stiles College. Morse College is named after Samuel Morse.

== Design ==
Morse College is an eclectic structure built on an odd, angular site with many design features that are reminiscent of Tuscan villages, most notably San Gimignano. The college's original construction consisted almost entirely of single rooms, and in a modern attempt to capture the spirit of Gothic architecture, Saarinen eliminated all right angles from the living areas. (Scully called the design an "anti-Masonic satire in brick and mortar." There are, of course, right angles in every window, between the floors and the walls, and the walls and the ceilings.) This resulted, notoriously, in two rooms which had eleven walls, none of which was long enough to put the bed against and still be able to open the door.

In a 1959 article in the Yale Daily News, Eero Saarinen discussed his design for Morse, noting "[o]ur primary effort was to create an architecture which would recognize the individual as individual instead of an anonymous integer in a group." However, right angles have been reintroduced into the architecture of Morse College after renovation in 2010.

The college provides several amenities to its resident "Morsels." The fourteen-story main tower provides an inspiring view of all of New Haven. The college's common areas include air hockey, pool, ping-pong, foosball, and a big-screen TV. A quieter atmosphere is found in Ericka's Room, a space filled with comfy couches, a TV, and board games. Ericka's Room memorializes Ericka Bishop '97, who was killed by a drunk driver just prior to the start of her junior year in Morse.

Morse has an adjacent "twin" residential college named "Ezra Stiles" which is architecturally similar and was built at the same time. The two distinct colleges share a combined dining hall, over which runs a public walkway to the Payne Whitney Gymnasium. Architecturally, Morse and Stiles differ from their predecessors by having more private space per student, and the lowest ratio of natural light aperture to wall surface of any other colleges. Morse and Stiles have unique architecture that sets them apart from the other colleges and sometimes against each other. The Morse-Stiles rivalry is decades old.

Morse College was entirely renovated during 2009–2010. The top-to-bottom refurbishment updated the facilities of the college to meet growing student needs while preserving the design and style Morse is known for.

The centerpiece of the renovation project is its new underground recreational spaces, including a theater, music practice rooms, a weaving studio, a recording studio, a digital media room, exercise facilities, and spaces for dance and aerobics. The space joins Morse with neighboring Ezra Stiles College via an underground courtyard spanned by a pedestrian bridge. The former 11,699 square feet of shared social space in Morse and Stiles swelled to 15,300 after the renovations. Pierson and Davenport, by comparison, together have 14,638.

Other completed work at Morse includes an upgrade of all mechanical and electrical facilities, a new roof, new windows, updates to meet fire-safety and handicapped-accessibility codes, and air conditioning for public spaces and the Head of College's suite. Student rooms, common rooms, the gallery, game room, and the buttery have also been upgraded to accommodate the goal of Yale's residential college system as a center for social interaction. There has also been a major reconfiguration of the kitchen and servery that expands the capacity of the dining halls in both Morse and Stiles.

Morse College freshmen are housed exclusively in the historic Durfee Hall, which, built in 1871, is among the oldest buildings on Yale's Old Campus. It is known for its unique housing quarters, 80% of which are singles—the highest percentage of any freshman housing. Durfee Hall has twelve-foot vaulted ceilings, hardwood floors, at least two fireplaces per suite, and a unique walk-through suite system that allows residents access to all floors and stairwells of the building. In the 1980s, Morse freshmen lived in Vanderbilt Hall.

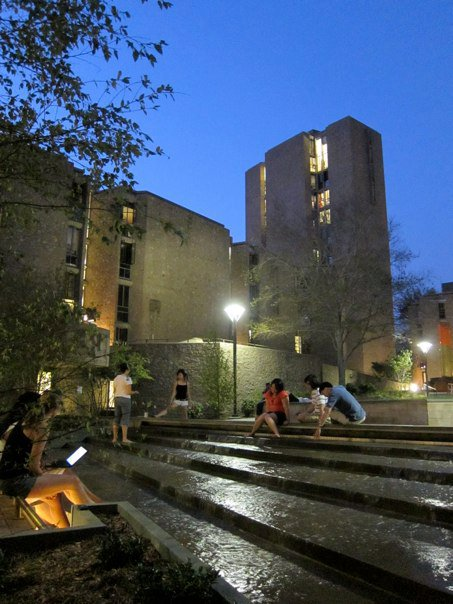
Students sitting near water feature, installed in 2010

== Heads or "Masters" of College ==
- Hwansoo Kim (2026 – current): Professor of Religious Studies
- Catherine Panter-Brick (2015 – 2026): anthropologist
- Amy Hungerford (2012–2015): historian and writer
- Frank Keil (2001–2012): linguist and psychologist
- Stanton Wheeler (1995–2001): law professor and social scientist
- Donald Quinlan (1987–1995): psychologist
- William Halo (1982–1987): professor of Assyriology and Babylonian Literature
- Richard Granger (1975–1982): physician
- Vincent Scully (1969–1975): art historian
- John W. Hall (1967–1969): historian
- Andrew Patterson (1962–1967): chemist

== Notable alumni ==
- Joe Lieberman, 1964, US Senator from Connecticut
- Douglas Warner, 1968, Chairman of J.P. Morgan
- Frank Shorter, 1969, Olympic runner
- Bronson Pinchot, 1981, actor
- Robert C. Lieberman, 1986, political scientist and provost of Johns Hopkins
- Clay Shirky, 1986, cyberculture expert
- Wilhelmina Wright, 1986, federal judge
- Jennifer Beals, 1987, actress
- Robert Dow, 1987, federal judge
- Ben Silbermann, 2003, CEO and co-founder of Pinterest
- Sada Jacobson, 2006, Olympic fencer
- Usha Vance, 2007, Second Lady of the United States, American lawyer
- Kevin Olusola, 2011, cellist and Pentatonix member
- Michaela Jill Murphy, 2017, voice actor of Toph from Avatar: The Last Airbender
