= Harold Peake =

British archaeologist

H. J. E. Peake FSA FRAI
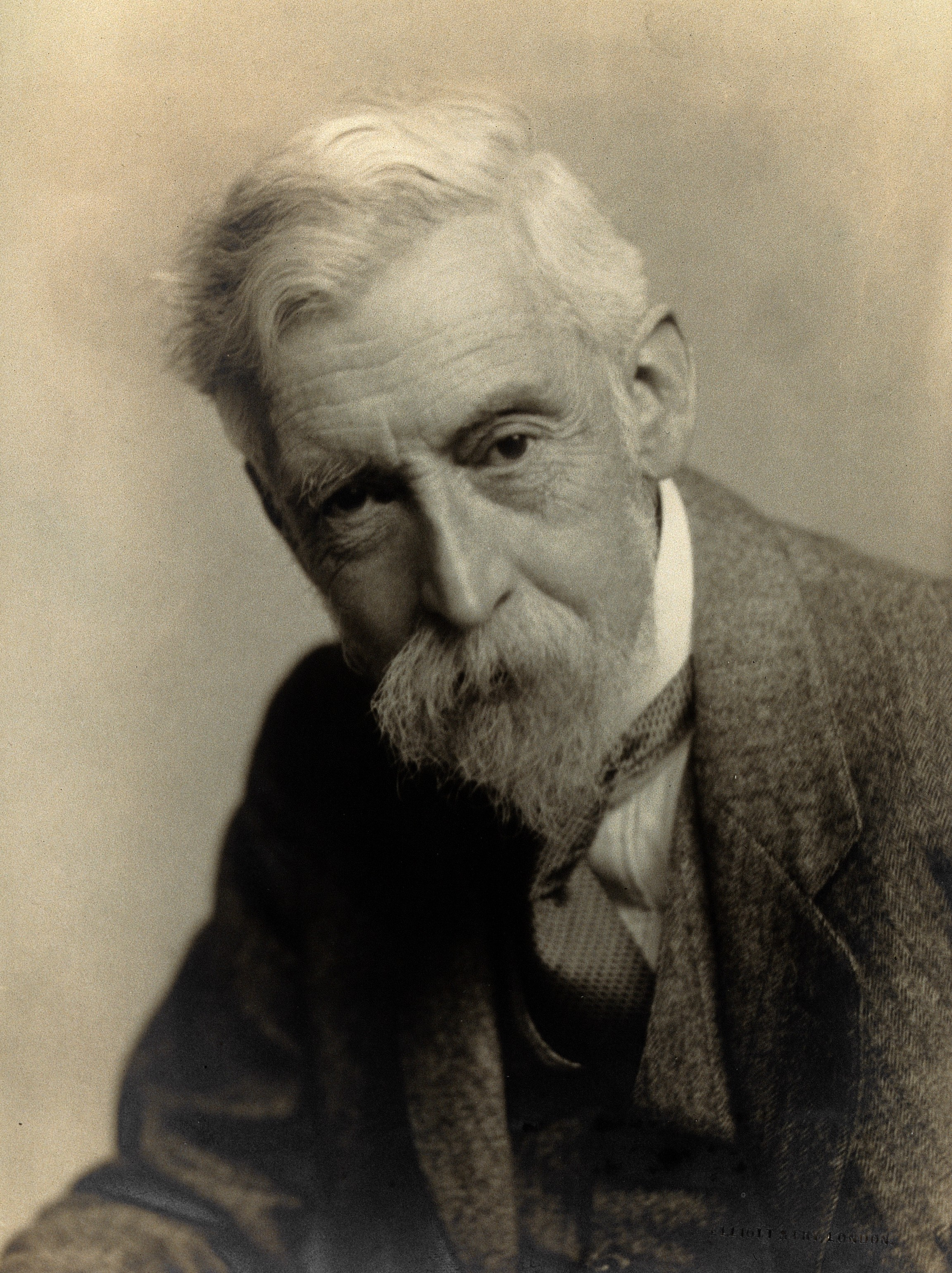
- Born: Harold John Edward Peake; 27 September 1867
- Died: 22 September 1946 (aged 78)

Academic work
- Discipline: Archaeologist
- Sub-discipline: Prehistory; Cultural diffusion; Origins of agriculture; archaeology of Britain
- Institutions: independent scholar

Harold John Edward Peake, FSA, FRAI (27 September 1867 – 22 September 1946) was a British archaeologist, anthropologist, museum curator, and independent scholar.

== Career ==
Peake was honorary curator of the Newbury Museum (now the West Berkshire Museum), which became well known for its pottery and chronological displays. He served as the president of the Royal Anthropological Institute of Great Britain and Ireland for a two-year period from 1926 to 1928. He was also a member of the council of the Society of Antiquaries of London from 1928 to 1930. He was known for his wide interests, from "[pioneering] research into the beginnings of cereal cultivation" in the Levant through to the local archaeology of Berkshire, and his unifying application of anthropological thought and archaeological evidence.

From 1927 through 1936, he was the co-author of the ten volumes of The Corridors of Time with H. J. Fleure, which aimed to cover world prehistory from "the dawn of human life to the periods when written ideas and abstract thought spread far and wide". A tenth volume was published posthumously in 1956 by Fleure who used research and notes they had done together.

He was awarded the Huxley Memorial Medal and Lecture in 1940; the lecture was titled "The study of prehistoric times".

=== Views ===
Peake proposed a "prospector theory" within the school of cultural diffusion: this theorised that the megalithic architecture of Europe such as the dolmens was spread by prospectors from the Eastern Mediterranean, probably originating from the Aegean Islands before 2200 BC, who were seeking commodities such as metal ores. He later argued that the rudiments of megalithic architecture originated in Syria c. 4000BC and from there spread to Egypt in the second pre-dynastic period and the eastern Mediterranean. He suggested that this was not the spread of a single culture within the same millennia, but of slow diffusion over time from mother sites to daughter sites, perhaps linked to a shared cult.

I have endeavoured to show that it is to the north-east of the Aegean that we must look for the centre from which mining prospectors set out for Spain and Brittany, carrying with them the elements of megalithic architecture.

— The Origin of the Dolmen (1916)

This is in contrast to Grafton Elliot Smith who argues for hyperdiffusionism with ancient Egypt as the single source of cultural practices, and to Luis Siret who argued that it was the Phoenicians who borough megaliths to the Iberian Peninsula. Peake suggested that Smith had overemphasised and oversimplified events by centring Egypt as the sole origin of cultural diffusion, and that Siret's argument was only possible because he moved the dates of the Phoenicians from 800 BC to 2000 BC.

== The Cult of Kata ==
Along with a group of others, Harold Peake created a joke religion called The Cult of Kata. The group, calling itself the Kataric Circle, was active from 1908 until the mid-1920s and included Peake and his wife (the illustrator and writer Carli Peake, born Charlotte Bayliff in 1862), the archaeologists O. G. S. Crawford and Richard Lowe Thompson, the musicians Francis Toye and Geoffrey Toye, and the folk revivalist Mary Neal. Very skeptical towards established religion, the Cult advocated "wild worship", connecting archaeology with theatre, music, folk dance and song while promoting (and parodying) utopian artistic projects. It was formed around Peake's home, Westbrook House in Boxford. A wide range of celebrities and intellectuals were drawn to the group, including actress Ina Pelly, celebrity chef Marcel Boulestin, urban planner Patrick Geddes and sociologist Victor Branford. Carli Peake wrote a series of plays known as The Boxford Pastoral Masques, performed by the Katanic Circle annually from 1905 to 1913. Annual performances were revived in Boxford from 2000.

== Selected works ==
- Peake, Harold (1916). "68. The Origin of the Dolmen". Man. 16: 116–121. doi:10.2307/2788934. ISSN 0025-1496.
- Peake, Harold (1922). The Bronze Age and the Celtic World. London: Benn Brothers. ISBN 9789356087347. OCLC 3728495 – via Project Gutenberg.
- Peake, Harold (1922). The English village, the origin and decay of its community; an anthropological interpretation. London: Benn Brothers.
- Peake, Harold (1930). The flood; new light on an old story. New York: Robert M. McBride.
- Peake, Harold (1933). Early steps in human progress. London: Sampson Low Marston.

The Corridors of Time

- Peake, Harold; Fleure, Herbert John (1927). The Corridors of Time, Vol I: Apes and Men. Oxford: Clarendon Press.
- Peake, Harold; Fleure, Herbert John (1927). The Corridors of Time, Vol II: Hunters and Artists. Oxford: Clarendon Press.
- Peake, Harold; Fleure, Herbert John (1927). The Corridors of Time, Vol III: Peasants and Potters. Oxford: Clarendon Press.
- Peake, Harold; Fleure, Herbert John (1927). The Corridors of Time, Vol IV: Priests and Kings. Oxford: Clarendon Press.
- Peake, Harold; Fleure, Herbert John (1928). The Corridors of Time, Vol V: The Steppe and the Sown. Oxford: Clarendon Press.
- Peake, Harold; Fleure, Herbert John (1929). The Corridors of Time, Vol VI: The Way of the Sea. Oxford: Clarendon Press.
- Peake, Harold; Fleure, Herbert John (1931). The Corridors of Time, Vol VII: Merchant Venturers in Bronze. Oxford: Clarendon Press.
- Peake, Harold; Fleure, Herbert John (1933). The Corridors of Time, Vol VIII: The Horse and the Sword. Oxford: Clarendon Press.
- Peake, Harold; Fleure, Herbert John (1936). The Corridors of Time, Vol IX: The Law and the Prophets. Oxford: Clarendon Press.
- Peake, Harold; Fleure, Herbert John (1956). The Corridors of Time, Vol X: Times and Places. Oxford: Clarendon Press.
