= Sally Falk Moore =

American anthropologist (1924–2021)

Sally Falk Moore (January 18, 1924 – May 2, 2021) was a legal anthropologist and professor emerita at Harvard University. She did her major fieldwork in Tanzania and published extensively on cross-cultural, comparative legal theory.

Moore was trained as a lawyer at Columbia Law school and, after working on Wall Street, became a staff attorney at the International Military Tribunal at Nuremberg during the investigation of Nazi war criminals. She then returned to the US and received her PhD in anthropology from Columbia University in 1957. She was chair of the anthropology section of the joint department of sociology and anthropology at the University of Southern California (1963–1977, 1969–1972) and a professor at University of California at Los Angeles (1977–1981) and Yale University (1975–1976) before she joined the Harvard University faculty in 1981. She was dean of the Graduate School at Harvard from 1985 to 1989. In 2010 she was appointed affiliated professor of international legal studies at Harvard Law School.

== Major publications ==
- Power and Property in Inca Peru. Morningside Heights, New York: Columbia University Press, 1958.
- Symbol and Politics in Communal Ideology: Cases and Questions. With Barbara G. Myerhoff, Cornell University Press, 1975. ISBN 0-8014-9157-6
- The Chagga and Meru of Tanzania (Ethnographic survey of Africa : East Central Africa). International African Institute, 1977. ISBN 0-85302-051-5
- Law As Process: An Anthropological Approach London; Boston: Routledge & K. Paul, 1978. ISBN 0-7100-8758-6, second edition 2000.
- Social Facts and Fabrications : "Customary" Law on Kilimanjaro, 1880-1980 (Lewis Henry Morgan Lectures). Cambridge University Press, 1986. ISBN 0-521-31201-9
- Anthropology and Africa: Changing Perspectives on a Changing Scene. Charlottesville : University Press of Virginia, 1994. ISBN 0-8139-1505-8
- "Certainties Undone: Fifty Turbulent Years of Legal Anthropology, 1949-1999," Huxley Memorial Lecture, Journal of the Royal Anthropological Institute, Vol.7, No. 1, March 2001.
- Law and Anthropology: A Reader, (edited), Blackwell, 2004. ISBN 1-4051-0228-4
- Moralizing States and the Ethnography of the Present. American Anthropological Association, 1993. ISBN 0-913167-60-6
- Introduction to The Silicon Empire: Law, Culture And Commerce.by Michael B. Likosky. Ashgate Publishing 2005. ISBN 0-7546-2457-9

== Some awards ==
- Ansley Prize, Columbia University 1957
- Mogan Lectures, University of Rochester, 1981
- Barnard College, Medal of Distinction 1987
- Guggenheim, 1995–1996
- Huxley Memorial Medalist and Lecturer for 1999, by the Royal Anthropological Institute in London. She was only the second woman so honored.
- Harry J. Kalven Jr. Prize, 2005
- Elected a member of the American Philosophical Society in 2005

== Notable students ==
- Craig Calhoun, appointed future director of the London School of Economics and Political Science from September 2012 on.
