= Negro Project =

Contraception awareness initiative

The Negro Project, conceptualized by birth control activist Margaret Sanger and implemented by the Birth Control Federation of America (now Planned Parenthood Federation of America), was an initiative to spread awareness of contraception to lower poverty rates in the South. Once the project received funding, it was taken out of Sanger's hands and taken over by the BCFA, who pushed funding into preexisting clinics. Dr. Clarence Gamble, physician and heir to the Proctor and Gamble soap company fortune, was an influential figure on the project, supervising and partially funding the endeavor. While the original plan for the Negro Project included educational outreach into black communities as well as the establishment of black-operated clinical resources, the project that was implemented deviated from this original design and was ultimately unsuccessful.

The Negro project lasted three years, beginning in 1939 and ending in 1942.

== History of the Negro Project ==
=== Sanger's Vision for the Negro Project ===
As a result of the National Emergency Council’s 1938 Report on the Economic Conditions of the South – a report which cited the region as the nation’s primary economic concern – national attention shifted towards fixing issues of Southern poverty. Birth control activists, including Margaret Sanger, believed that one way to combat Southern poverty was through increased access to birth control, and Sanger aimed to tackle Southern poverty by addressing black Southern poverty in particular.

Drawing upon her previous experience with opening a successful birth control clinic in Harlem, New York, the Harlem Clinic, Sanger conceptualized the Negro Project. The goals of the project, as defined by Sanger in a proposal written to Albert Lasker, an American advertising executive and philanthropist whose $20,000 donation provided much of the funding for the project, were to improve the overall quality of life for Southern blacks by reducing high infant and mother mortality rates, promoting higher education, increasing access to public health clinics, etc.

In the proposal of the Negro Project, Sanger delineated two essential components: that of educational outreach and that of clinical access. In order to facilitate educational outreach, Sanger believed it was imperative to recruit the aid of black ministers and physicians. Sanger noted that their primary responsibility would be to tour the South, dispelling misconceptions about birth control and promoting the use of future clinical resources. Additionally, being aware of the general distrust that existed between black patients and white doctors, Sanger believed that their involvement in outreach would be instrumental in ensuring continued use of the clinical resources. According to Sanger, then, only after a successful educational campaign, should black-operated birth control clinics be established and opened for use.

The BCFA, Birth Control Federation of America, readily accepted Sanger’s proposal.

=== Deviation from Sanger's Plan: The BCFA's Implemented Negro Project ===
Though initially accepting Sanger’s plan for the project, committee members of the BCFA later dismissed her ideas, opting out of establishing black-run clinical services and dropping the concept of an educational campaign altogether. Instead, the BCFA decided to funnel Lasker’s $20,000 contribution into pre-existing clinics, clinics which were typically run by white doctors and nurses.

Between the years 1940 to 1942, the BCFA funded demonstration clinics in many counties across South Carolina as well as in Nashville, Tennessee. The clinical hubs of the BCFA’s activities in Nashville were Fisk University, a historically black college, and Bethlehem Center, a black settlement house. The clinics’ daily operations at Fisk University and Bethlehem Center were conducted by black physicians and nurses.In South Carolina, the BCFA employed black nurses to advocate for the use of contraceptives.

The BCFA touted its projects in South Carolina and Nashville as a success. In actuality, however, the participation rates among black women were low while the recidivism rates were high. Additionally, the BCFA’s Negro Project did not lead to the opening of any more clinics, indicating no lasting impact of the project.
