= Journal of Biosocial Science =

- Discipline: Biology, sociology
- Language: English
- Edited by: Alejandra Núñez-de la Mora

Publication details
- Former name: The Eugenics Review
- History: 1909–present
- Publisher: Cambridge University Press
- Frequency: Bimonthly
- Impact factor: 2.148 (2021)

Standard abbreviations
- ISO 4: J. Biosoc. Sci.

Indexing
- Journal of Biosocial Science
- CODEN: JBSLAR
- ISSN: 0021-9320 (print); 1469-7599 (web)
- LCCN: 72626522
- OCLC no.: 01754471
- The Eugenics Review
- ISSN: 0374-7573

Links
- Journal homepage; Online access; Online archive; The Eugenics Review archive

The Journal of Biosocial Science is a bimonthly peer-reviewed scientific journal covering the intersection of biology and sociology. It is the continuation of The Eugenics Review, published by the Galton Institute from 1909 to 1968. It obtained its current name in 1969, with volume numbering re-starting at 1, and switched publishers to Cambridge University Press. The editor-in-chief is Dr Alejandra Núñez-de la Mora (Universidad Veracruzana).

== Abstracting and indexing ==
The journal is abstracted and indexed in:

- Biological Abstracts
- BIOSIS Previews
- CAB Abstracts
- CINAHL
- Current Contents/Social and Behavioral Sciences
- Embase
- EBSCO databases
- Index Medicus/MEDLINE/PubMed
- International Bibliography of the Social Sciences
- ProQuest databases
- PsycINFO
- Scopus
- Social Sciences Citation Index

According to the Journal Citation Reports, the journal has a 2021 impact factor of 2.148.

== Notable studies ==
In 2006, the journal published a controversial study arguing that Ashkenazi Jews are more intelligent than other ethnic groups as a result of human evolution.

== Past editors ==
- Alan Sterling Parkes (1969–1978)
- Derek F. Roberts (1979–1988)
- C. G. Nicholas Mascie-Taylor (1989–2021)
