= H. J. Fleure =

British scientist

Professor H. J. Fleure FRS FRAI
- Born: Herbert John Fleure; 6 June 1877; Guernsey, Channel Islands
- Died: 1 July 1969 (aged 92)

Academic background
- Education: University of Wales, Aberystwyth

Academic work
- Discipline: Zoology; Geography
- Institutions: University of Wales, Aberystwyth; University of Manchester

Herbert John Fleure, FRS FRAI (6 June 1877 – 1 July 1969) was a British zoologist and geographer. He was secretary of the Geographical Association, editor of Geography, and president of the Cambrian Archaeological Association (1924–25), Royal Anthropological Institute (1945–47) and Geographical Association (1948–49).

== Early years ==
Fleure was born in Guernsey on 6 June 1877, the son of Jean Fleure and Marie Le Rougetel. He often astonished friends and relatives in the mid-twentieth century by recounting how his father had been taken to visit the battlefield of Waterloo shortly after the battle (his father was born in 1803 and died in 1889). In 1897, he attended the University of Wales, Aberystwyth, where he founded the Student Representative Council. He graduated B.Sc. with first-class honours in late 1901 and was offered a University Fellowship. He went on to study at the Zoological Institute in Zurich, Switzerland.

== Career ==
Returning to Wales, Fleure became head of the Department of Zoology at Aberystwyth in 1908. He assisted Professor Patrick Geddes with the mounting of the Cities and Town Planning Exhibition in Dublin in August 1914. From 1914 to 1920 he was president of Aberystwyth Old Students' Association. In 1917, he became Professor of Anthropology and Geography at the university, holding the post until 1930, when he became professor of geography at Victoria University, Manchester. He was elected to membership of the Manchester Literary and Philosophical Society on 2 February 1932 and President of the Society 1940–44. He was made a Fellow of the Royal Society in 1936. Following his retirement in 1944, he was president of the Royal Anthropological Institute from 1945 to 1947.

He was a founder member of the Guernsey Society, which was established in 1943 to represent the interests of the Nazi-occupied island to the British Authorities. After the war, he was a regular contributor to The Quarterly Review, as well as to The Guernsey Farmhouse, a book published by the Society in 1964 celebrating the ancient family houses in the island. He also authored biographies of several scientists including Arthur Robert Hinks, Alfred Cort Haddon, James George Frazer and Emmanuel de Margerie

From 1927 through 1956 he was the co-author of the ten volumes of The Corridors of Time by Harold John Edward Peake.

== Personal life ==
In 1910 Fleure married Hilda Mary Bishop in King's Lynn; they had one son and one daughter. Hilda (1885-1974) survived her husband by five years.

== Honours ==
He was awarded an Honorary Fellowship from the American Geographical Society in 1930, and its Daly Medal in 1939. He was elected to membership of The Manchester Literary and Philosophical Society in 1932. He received the Victoria Medal of the Royal Geographical Society in 1946.

== Works ==
- Human Geography in Western Europe (1918)
- The Peoples of Europe (1922)
- Races of England and Wales (1923)
- French Life and its Problems (1942)
- A Natural History of Man in Britain (1951; revised edition 1969) (New Naturalist series)
- The Guernsey Farmhouse (1964)

== Bibliography ==
- Bowen, E. G. "Professor H. J. Fleure on his 80th birthday: an appreciation of his contributions to Geography", in: Geog.; 42, 1957
- Archives Network Wales - short biography
- Welsh Biography Online

Professional and academic associations
Preceded by John Henry Hutton	President of the Royal Anthropological Institute; 1945–47	Succeeded by Cyril Daryll Forde
Preceded by Douglas Rayner Hartree	President of the Manchester Literary and Philosophical Society; 1940–44	Succeeded by Michael Polanyi
Preceded by Sir John Edward Lloyd	President of the Cambrian Archaeological Association; 1924–25	Succeeded by Hon. Charles Urien Rhys
Preceded by Thomas Jones	President of the Aberystwyth Old Students' Association; 1914–20	Succeeded by Henry Howard Humphreys
