= British Social Hygiene Council =

British organisation

British Social Hygiene Council (BSHC, until 1925 the National Council for Combating Venereal Diseases, NCCVD) was a British organization dedicated to eradicating venereal diseases and educating the public about them. It was founded in 1914.

== History ==
National Council for Combating Venereal Diseases (NCCVD) was founded in 1914, just days before the beginning of World War I. Its members include doctors, scientists, psychologists, sociologists and 'muscular Christians.' It got government funding until 1929.

== See also ==
- Social hygiene movement
