= G. Ainsworth Harrison =

English biological anthropologist

Geoffrey Ainsworth Harrison
- Born: 8 June 1927; Teddington, Middlesex, England
- Died: 14 September 2017 (aged 90); Oxford, England
- Education: Trinity College, Cambridge; University of Oxford
- Awards: 1987 Huxley Memorial Medal from the Royal Anthropological Institute of Great Britain and Ireland
- Scientific career
- Fields: Biological anthropology
- Institutions: University of Liverpool; University of Oxford
- Thesis: Study of growth, body form, and heat tolerance of different strains of mice in hot environments with an analysis of the relative contributions of the genetic and non-genetic factors involved (1958)
- Doctoral advisor: Joseph Weiner

Geoffrey Ainsworth Harrison FRAI (8 June 1927 – 14 September 2017) was an English biological anthropologist who taught at the University of Oxford.

== Early life and education ==
Harrison was born in Teddington, Middlesex, England, on 8 June 1927. He received a 1st class degree from Trinity College, Cambridge, where he read natural sciences. At Cambridge, he became interested in anthropology after attending a lecture on Australopithecus by paleontologist Robert Broom. He received his DPhil from the University of Oxford for his work on the adaptation of mice to warm environments, which he conducted under the supervision of Joseph Weiner.

== Academic career ==
Harrison's first academic position was as a lecturer at the University of Liverpool, where he studied skin pigmentation. In 1963, he joined the faculty at Oxford as Reader in Physical Anthropology, where he was appointed Professor of Biological Anthropology in 1976. As a faculty member at Oxford, he was noted for his central role in the founding of the Human Sciences degree. He also helped to establish Oxford's Diploma in Human Biology, the Department of Biological Anthropology (later the Institute of Biological Anthropology), and the MSc in Human Biology. He retired from Oxford in 1994, though he continued to write and conduct research for an additional 20 years. He received the Huxley Memorial Medal from the Royal Anthropological Institute in 1987 for his work 'Social Heterogeneity and Biological Variation' although no papers on this are held by the institute.

== Professional affiliations ==
Harrison was president of the Royal Anthropological Institute from 1969 to 1970. He was also chair of the Society for the Study of Human Biology and of the Biosocial Society, as well as a member of many learned societies.

== Death ==
Harrison died in Oxford, England, on 14 September 2017.
