= Jean Alfred Fournier =

French dermatologist (1832–1914)

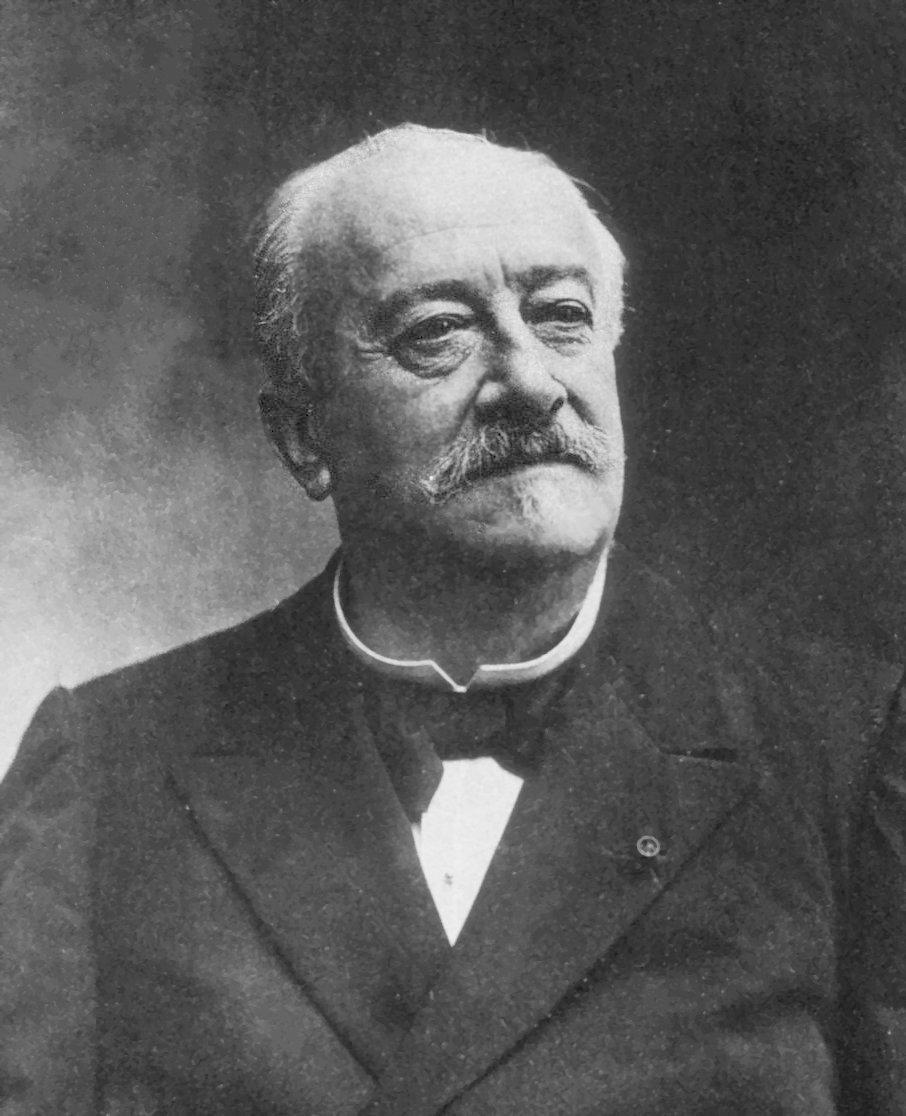
- Born: 21 May 1832; Paris, France
- Died: 23 December 1914 (aged 82); Paris, France
- Medical career
- Profession: physician
- Field: dermatology, venereology
- Institutions: Hôpital Saint-Louis, Académie de Médecine
- Research: clinical dermatology, medical history, syphilis

Jean Alfred Fournier (French pronunciation: [ʒɑ̃ alfʁɛd fuʁnje]; 21 May 1832 – 23 December 1914) was a French dermatologist who specialized in the study of venereal disease.

== Biography ==
As a young man Fournier served as an intern at the Hôpital du Midi as an understudy to Philippe Ricord (1800–1889). In 1863 he became médecine des hôpitaux, and from 1867 worked with Augustin Grisolle (1811–1869) at the Hôtel-Dieu de Paris. In 1876 he was appointed chef de service at the Hôpital Saint-Louis, later becoming a member of the Académie de Médecine (1880).

His main contribution to medical science was the study of congenital syphilis, of which he provided a description of in 1883. In his numerous publications he stressed the importance of syphilis being the cause of degenerative diseases. In addition, in 1901 he founded an organization devoted to spreading knowledge to combat syphilis, called the Société Française de Prophylaxie Sanitaire et Morale.

His name is associated with the following three medical terms:

- Fournier's gangrene: gangrene caused by infection of the scrotum and usually associated with diabetes. Although the condition is named after Fournier after he published a series of five cases, it was first described by a physician named Baurienne in 1764.
- Fournier's sign: scars on the mouth following the healing of lesions in congenital syphilis.
- Fournier's tibia: fusiform thickening and anterior bowing of the tibia in congenital syphilis.

Along with his study of venereal disease, Fournier was also a medical historian, republishing works by erstwhile physicians that included Girolamo Fracastoro (1478–1553), Giovanni de Vigo (1460–1525) and Jacques de Béthencourt.

== Selected publications ==
- Syphilis and Marriage. London: David Bogue. 1881.
