= Social hygiene movement =

Public health movement

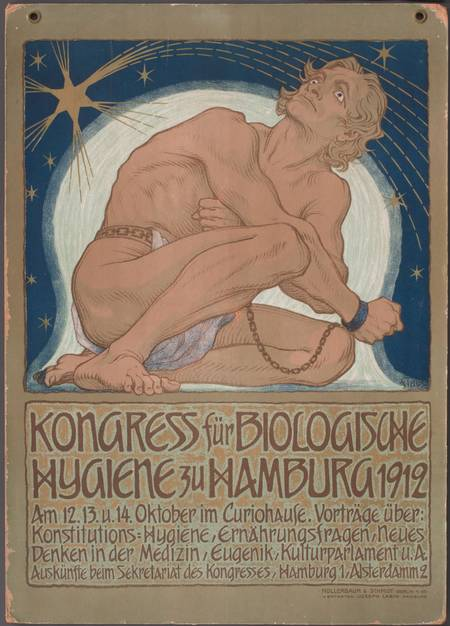
Poster for the Hygiene Congress in Hamburg, 1912

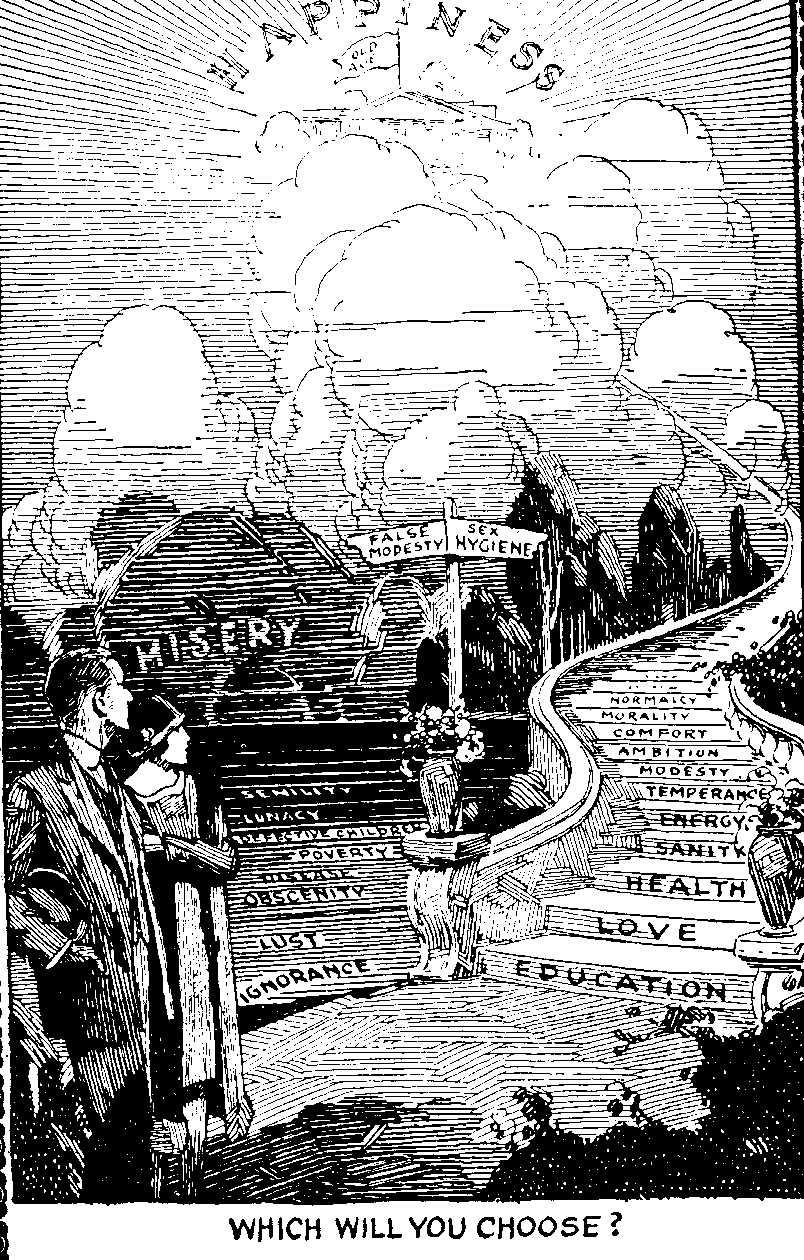
"Sex hygiene" is contrasted with "false modesty" in this frontispiece to an early 20th-century book.

The social hygiene movement was an attempt by reformers in the late 19th and early 20th century to deal with problems that were seen to have a social background, including venereal disease, tuberculosis, alcoholism and mental illness. Social hygienists emphasized strict self-discipline as a solution to societal ills and often blamed problems on rapid urbanization. The movement continued throughout much of the 20th century.

== History ==
People in the social hygiene movement of the late 19th and early 20th aimed to create high standards of what they considered to be moral and sexual responsibility. They wanted to prevent venereal disease, tuberculosis, addiction and mental illness, which were often considered as linked problems.

In some countries, the social hygiene movement represented a rationalized, professionalized version of the earlier social purity movement.

Many social hygienists were also supporters of eugenics. Concerned by degeneration and heredity, they argued for negative eugenics: that some groups should be encouraged or forced to stop procreating.

=== Internationally ===
The League of Nations Health Organization, the International Labour Organization, the Rockefeller Foundation and the Pasteur Institute all supported social hygiene programmes. In Europe, supporters of social hygiene and left-wing politics often overlapped.

Some social hygiene campaign groups such as the International Abolitionist Federation were also active in international campaigning against human trafficking.

=== Australia ===
This link between racial hygiene and social hygiene movements can be seen in Australia, where the Racial Hygiene Association of New South Wales is now named The Family Planning Association.

=== Bulgaria ===
In Bulgaria, the journal Borba discussed social hygiene. Articles suggested that feminism and anti-alcoholism would help to reduce venereal disease but women's involvement in social hygiene campaigns was controversial.

=== France ===
In France, Alfred Fournier ran the Sanitary and Moral Prophylaxis Society. In 1908, they advocated for national sex education. The National Council of French Women also operated a Feminine Education Committee, which sought to provide sex education.

=== Germany ===
Social welfare politics in early 20th-century Germany were dominated by social hygiene and it became a discipline in German medical universities. The chair of Sozialhygiene was created for Alfred Grotjahn at the University of Berlin in 1920.

=== India ===
In 1897, the Indian Contagious Diseases Acts were enacted and social hygiene campaigners campaigned against them. Social hygiene campaigns continued in India into the Interwar period.

=== Soviet Union ===
The social hygiene approach was adopted in medical schools in the Soviet Union in the 1920s and was supported by the Commissariat of Public Health. The definition adopted by Commissar Nikolai Semashko was less focussed on eugenics and more in line with what is now regarded as public health: “study of the influence of economic and social factors on the incidence of disease and on the ways to make the population healthy”.

The State Institute for Social Hygiene opened in 1923. The social hygiene movement declined in the Soviet Union as critiques of social conditions came to be seen as anti-government views. In 1930 the institute was renamed the Institute of Organisation of Health Care and Hygiene.

=== Sweden ===
In Sweden, socialist and feminist groups campaigned for sex hygiene and education from the early 20th century.

=== Switzerland ===
Swiss psychiatrist and entomologist Auguste Forel was an advocate for social hygiene.

=== United Kingdom ===
In the UK, many social hygiene campaign groups aimed to created higher moral standards and fight against government regulation of prostitution. This was linked with women's rights campaigns, as organisations such as Josephine Butler's Ladies' National Association and the Association for Moral and Social Hygiene (AMSH) wanted to make men equally responsible for their sexual morals and behaviour rather than to only punish women sex workers. This approach was a response to the Contagious Diseases Acts. The Acts were repealed in 1886.

Like groups in other locations, social hygienists in the UK also wanted to reduce venereal disease. In 1914, the National Council for Combatting Venereal Disease (NCCVD, renamed the British Social Hygiene Council or BSHC in 1925) was created by people worried about venereal disease outbreaks that might happen as a result of war. Trends in public health campaigning in the mid-1920s led to a focus on prevention rather than treatment of venereal disease.

Advisory Committee on Social Hygiene for the Colonial Office was created in 1924 to advise on sexual morality and venereal disease. William Ormsby-Gore was chair, and membership overlapped with that of the NCCVD and the AMSH.

=== United States ===
During the Progressive Era, physicians and moral reformers worked together to try to manage prostitution and educate people on social hygiene. During the early 20th century, social hygienists in the US successfully campaigned for legal and bureaucratic changes.

The American Vigilance Association was created to fight prostitution, and the American Federation for Sex Hygiene was created to educate people about venereal disease. The two organizations called a meeting in Buffalo, New York which the term “social hygiene” was used to refer to their mutual interests and the organizations merged to become the American Social Hygiene Association (ASHA) in 1914. Its member's ideas were published in journals such as the American Journal of Public Health.

ASHA partnered with the government during World War I. The Association provided social hygiene health and sexual health information to soldiers in hopes that this education would help reduce the number of men who were unable to fight due to the effects of venereal diseases. During World War II, ASHA continued to work with the government, including on a project targeting African American communities.

From the 1940s, social hygienists such as Ruth Beach argued that parents were failing to educate their children in sex hygiene and said that more schools should provide this education. Social hygiene ideas were spread in the form of classroom films about menstruation, sexually transmitted disease, drug abuse and acceptable sexual behavior in addition to an array of pamphlets, posters, textbooks and films.

== See also ==
- Sex education
- History of condoms
- Racial hygiene
