= List of sex hygiene films =

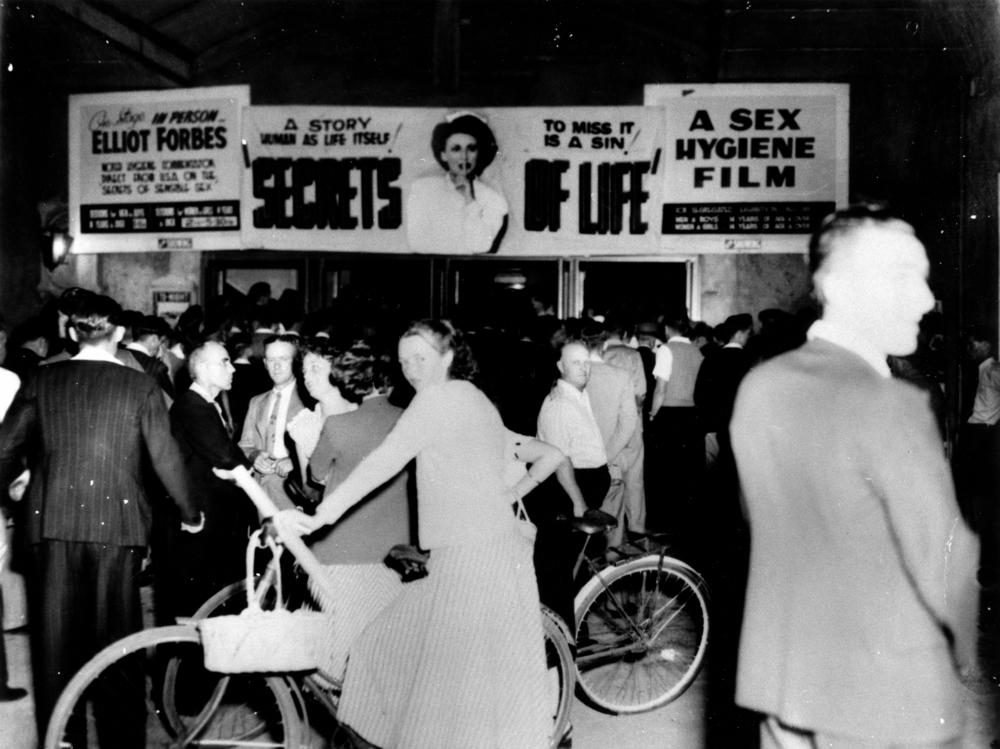
Crowd around an Australian theater showing a sex hygiene film in the 1950s

The sex hygiene film was a genre of film dealing with stories involving sexual health, particularly sexually transmitted disease (hence the slang label "clap opera"), but also sometimes touching on topics such as prostitution, birth control, and illegitimacy. The genre had its origins in the United States around the time of World War I. Early sex hygiene films were created by mainstream studios and, though their treatment of a taboo topic was controversial, they were perceived as having positive educational value. By the 1920s, sex hygiene films had begun to include graphic depictions of human anatomy, and the genre evolved into an early example of exploitation films. A 1928 article noted that there were 15 to 20 films in circulation, but that some were composed of splices from other films, whose purpose was to allow sex hygiene and medical education books to be sold in the lobby.

Sex hygiene films were publicly exhibited at theatres and often drew large audiences, though attendance was sometimes limited to adults, or to only one sex. Sometimes the promoter would have up to three versions of the film available in the theater and, upon a signal indicating that police or authorities were present, would show the more acceptable version of the film.

== List of sex hygiene films ==
List of sex hygiene films
Title	Year	Notes
A Victim of Sin	1913	The film's plot closely follows the play Damaged Goods, and was likely an attempt to capitalize on the play's success.
Damaged Goods	1914	Adaptation of the play Les Avariés written by Eugène Brieux in 1901, and performed on Broadway under the English title Damaged Goods in 1913. Richard Bennett played the lead in both the Broadway play and the film.
Where Are My Children?	1916	US film about birth control and abortion directed by Lois Weber.
S.O.S.	1917	Released by American Standard, the film follows Harold, a rakish young man who contracts venereal disease and steals away Ruth, the fiancée of his brother John. Ruth and Harold have a child who is born "a hopeless cripple and a degenerate".
Let There Be Light (Es werde Licht!)	1917	One of the first German sexual hygiene films.
Fit to Fight	1918	An anti-venereal disease film produced for the U.W. War Department Commission and initially shown to members of the military. Later re-edited and released theatrically to the public under the title Fit to Win.
The Spreading Evil	1918	Produced by James Keane. A wartime story dealing with the spread of venereal disease. Praised by Josephus Daniels, secretary of the US Navy.
On doit le dire	1918	A seven-minute animated short directed by Jean Comandon. Included microscopic footage of the spirochete bacteria causing syphilis as well as images of syphilitic chancres. One of the first sexual hygiene films produced in France.
The Scarlet Trail	1918 or early 1919	Tells the story of a quack doctor, Ezra Grafton, selling phony cures for venereal disease, whose son, Bob, is planning to marry. When Bob discovers he has congenital syphilis, he commits suicide. Praised in the press for its "clean" treatment of the topic of venereal disease.
Wild Oats (also known as Some Wild Oats)	1919	Deals with syphilis. Criticized by one reviewer for its "coating of vulgar humor".
Open Your Eyes	1919	An early production of the Warner brothers, dealing with syphilis.
The End of the Road	1919	Produced by the American Social Hygiene Association, targets young women with warnings about premarital sex and venereal disease.
The Solitary Sin	1919	Reissued in 1924 as The Naked Truth. Produced by Samuel Cummins. A cautionary tale about "the dangers and results of association with lewd women", the film follows the lives of three young men as they mature from boys to men. The film depicted nudity, including graphic images of diseased genitalia, and was censored in the United States.
Die Geschlechtskrankheiten und ihre Folgen	1919/1920	Directed by Nicholas Kaufmann and produced by the education department of the Universum Film AG (UFA).
False Shame (Falsche Scham)	1926	
Feind im Blut	1931	
Damaged Lives	1933	Canadian exploitation film adaptation of the syphilis drama Les Avariés (or Damaged Goods).
Mom and Dad	1945	Added to the National Film Registry in 2005

== See also ==
- Pre-Code sex films
- Sexploitation film
- Social hygiene movement
- Social guidance film
- Social problem film
- Sex Hygiene (1942)
- To the People of the United States (1944)
