= Damaged Goods (1937 film) =

1937 film

- Directed by: Phil Goldstone
- Written by: Joseph Hoffman
- Based on: Les Avariés by Eugène Brieux
- Produced by: Phil Goldstone; Irving Starr
- Starring: Pedro de Cordoba; Phyllis Barry; Douglas Walton
- Cinematography: Ira H. Morgan
- Edited by: Holbrook N. Todd
- Production company: Criterion Pictures
- Distributed by: Grand National Pictures
- Release date: May 22, 1937
- Running time: 61 minutes
- Country: United States
- Language: English

Damaged Goods is a 1937 American drama film directed by Phil Goldstone and starring Pedro de Cordoba, Phyllis Barry and Douglas Walton. It is based on the play Les Avariés by Eugène Brieux and the subsequent adapted novel Damaged Goods by Upton Sinclair. A silent film adaptation Damaged Goods had been made in 1914.

The film's sets were designed by the art director Frank Dexter.

== Plot ==
A young lawyer, engaged to the daughter of a Congressman, attends a party where he has a fling with another woman. Two weeks later he suspects that he has contracted syphilis from her.

== Cast ==
- Pedro de Cordoba as Dr. Edward B. Walker
- Phyllis Barry as Margie
- Douglas Walton as George Dupont
- Arletta Duncan as Henrietta Allen
- Ferdinand Munier as Congressman Allen
- Esther Dale as Mrs. Dupont
- Clarence Wilson as Dr. N.R. Shryer
- Greta Meyer as Bertha
- Frank Melton as Jack
- Gretchen Thomas as Woman Patient
- Dorothy Short as Table Dancer

== Bibliography ==
- Schaefer, Eric. "Bold! Daring! Shocking! True!": A History of Exploitation Films, 1919-1959. Duke University Press, 1999.
