= Commission on Training Camp Activities =

World War I agency of the U.S. Department of War

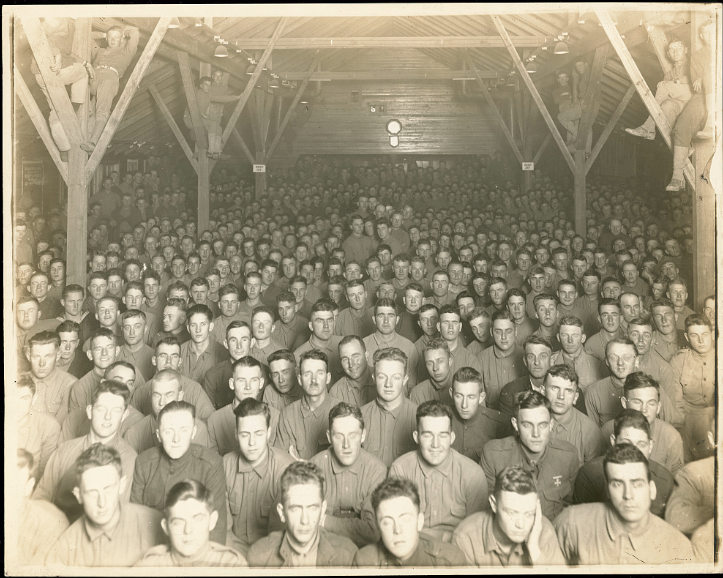
Commission on Training Camp Activities photograph of recruits at a training camp

The Commission on Training Camp Activities (CTCA), also popularly known as the Fosdick Commission, was an umbrella agency within the United States Department of War during World War I that provided recreational and educational activities for soldiers as they trained for combat. Established in April 1917, the CTCA had the mandate to keep American troops "physically healthy and morally pure", while also motivating them to fight.

== Formation ==
The Department of War established the Commission on Training Camp Activities on April 17, 1917, less than two weeks after the U.S. entered World War I. Secretary of War Newton D. Baker appointed Raymond B. Fosdick to lead the new agency. Fosdick was the author of an August 1916 report which found that problems with alcohol and prostitution were rife at the military training camps on the Mexican border during the Mexican Expedition. To improve the moral aspects of camp life, Fosdick had recommended public condemnation of the "illicit trades" and making alternative forms of recreation available to soldiers.

Both President Woodrow Wilson and Secretary Baker sought to build support for American entry into World War I by defining the objectives of the war in terms that appealed to progressives. In the international sphere, Wilson had argued that Americans would be making the world "safe for democracy" and that the U.S. was "but one of the champions of the rights of mankind". Domestically, American soldiers would be part of a reform program that would fight the forces of degradation that had traditionally plagued military training camps. Wilson sought to reassure the public that they could entrust their young men to the military, stating:

The Federal Government has pledged its word that as far as care and vigilance can accomplish the result, the men committed to its charge will be returned to the homes and communities that so generously gave them with no scars except those won in honorable conflict.

By keeping alcohol and prostitutes away from soldiers, the CTCA aimed to cultivate the "man-power and manhood" of the American troops.

A "twin" Commission on Training Camp Activities was later created for the Department of the Navy at the request of Secretary of the Navy Josephus Daniels.

== Programs ==
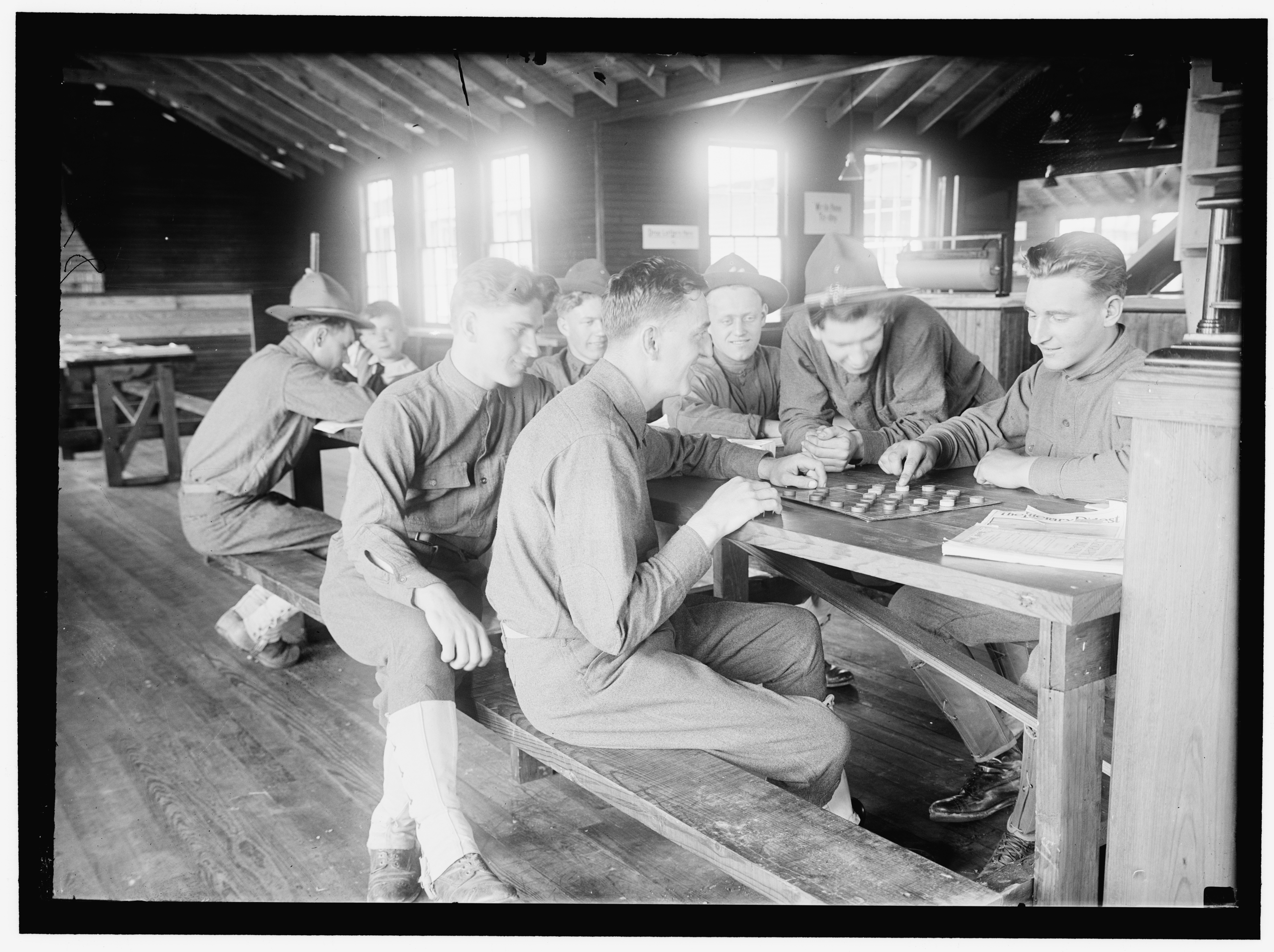
Soldiers engaged in recreation at a YMCA hut in a training camp

The CTCA's primary objective from the start was to prevent the spread of venereal disease among American soldiers. To address this, it introduced programs in social hygiene, education, recreation, law enforcement, and prophylaxis.

Tasked with raising the morals and the morale of troops in military training camps across the U.S., the CTCA sponsored activities, including athletics, singing, movies, theatre, libraries, and lectures, as well as sex education.

The CTCA cooperated with voluntary organizations, particularly the YMCA, which established "huts" where soldiers could engage in social activities, such as playing cards, writing letters, or attending lectures or performances. Similar camp establishments were also created by the National Jewish Welfare Board and the Knights of Columbus.

The agency's ideology was characterized by the Progressive Era, which strived against prostitution, alcoholism, "social diseases", and poor sanitary conditions in major cities. While attempting to eradicate these problems from training camps, the CTCA also aimed to "socialize and Americanize" native-born and foreign-born soldiers to meet the expected level of social standards and to integrate them into the armed forces. However, sources found that ethnic organizations and community leaders from these groups pushed back and attempted to preserve their own cultures.

=== Sex education ===
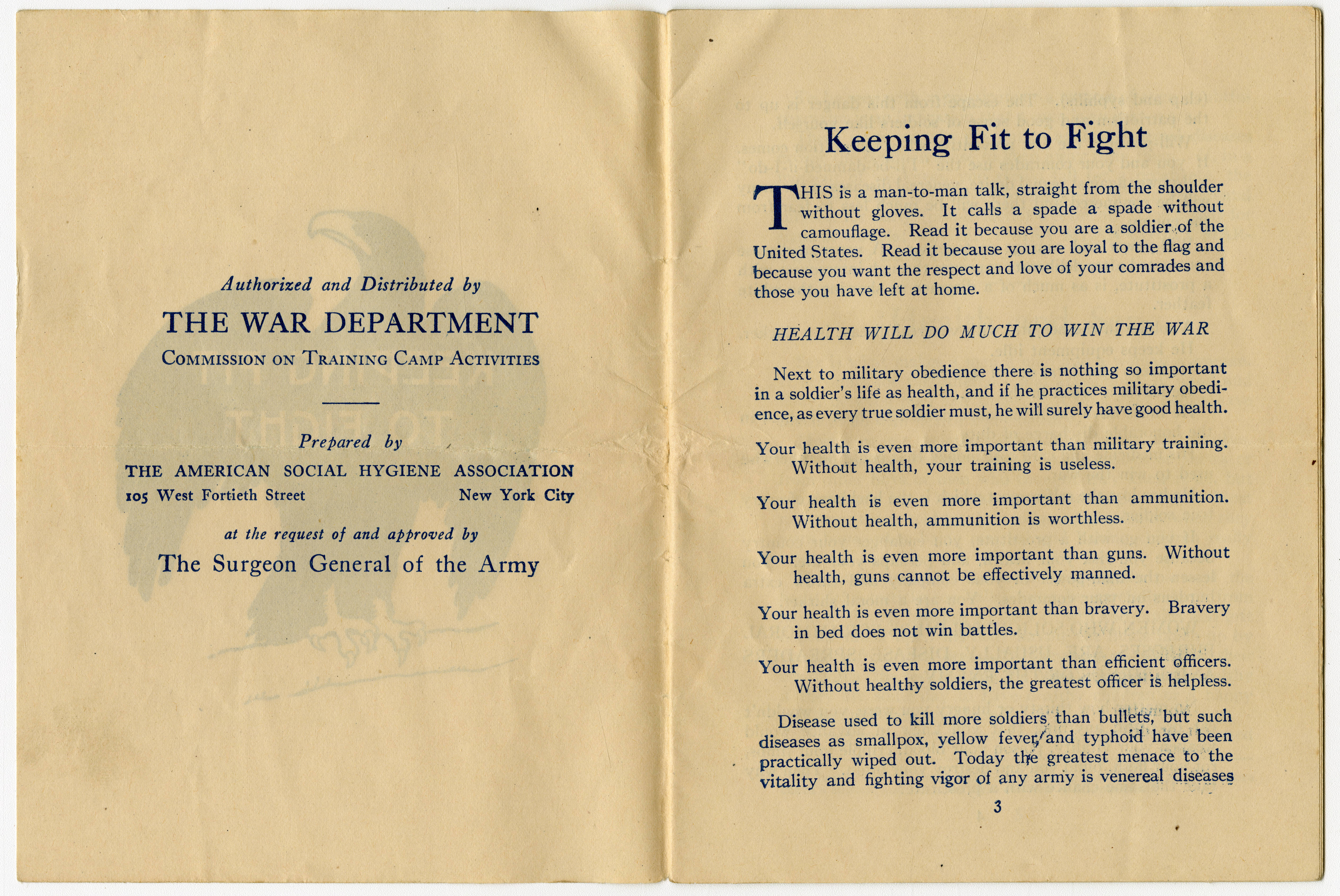
The inside cover and first page of "Keeping Fit to Fight", the CTCA's most widely distributed pamphlet

Raymond Fosdick appointed Walter Clarke of the American Social Hygiene Association to head the Social Hygiene Instruction Division of the CTCA, which created educational materials for troops such as lectures and pamphlets, with the goal of encouraging sexual continence to reduce the spread of venereal disease.

Whereas venereal diseases were, at the time, commonly treated as a symptom of moral or spiritual degeneration, the CTCA's instruction took a scientific, rational approach. Lecturers were advised to avoid "words of semitheological connotation, as well as all words with a sentimental or 'sob' tinge."

The CTCA's instruction urged sexual continence (i.e. abstinence from sex), in opposition to the sexual double standard which had prevailed in the previous century, in which women were expected to remain chaste until marriage, but it was tolerated for men to exercise their sexual energy with multiple partners. Some military officers and politicians opposed this progressive angle, and clung to the notion that men needed sexual outlets to maintain their morale or vigour. Samuel Gompers, a leader in the American labor movement, and a member of the Council of National Defense gave a spirited denunciation of the tack at a meeting of the council:

What have you been doing? Sold out to the so-called "social hygienists" and the prohibition fanatics, long-haired men and short-haired women? You shall not make the war an opportunity for these complacent so-called "reformers" to accomplish their nefarious work! When have fighting men been preached to on the beneficence of continence? The millennium has not arrived and until it does your pronouncements of yesterday will not be accepted. Real men will be men.

Among the tools used by CTCA educators to promote continence were gruesome imagery and stories demonstrating the consequences of venereal disease infections. Educators also pointed to what progressive physicians at the time termed "innocent infections"—that is, the potential for men to contract a disease during service and later transmit them to their wives, who may in turn transmit them to their newborn children. They also sought to dispel the notion that continued sexual activity served to maintain or strengthen a man's sexual potency, positing instead that the opposite was the scientific reality: that men had finite sexual reserves, and could weaken themselves by an excess of sexual exertion.

=== Films ===
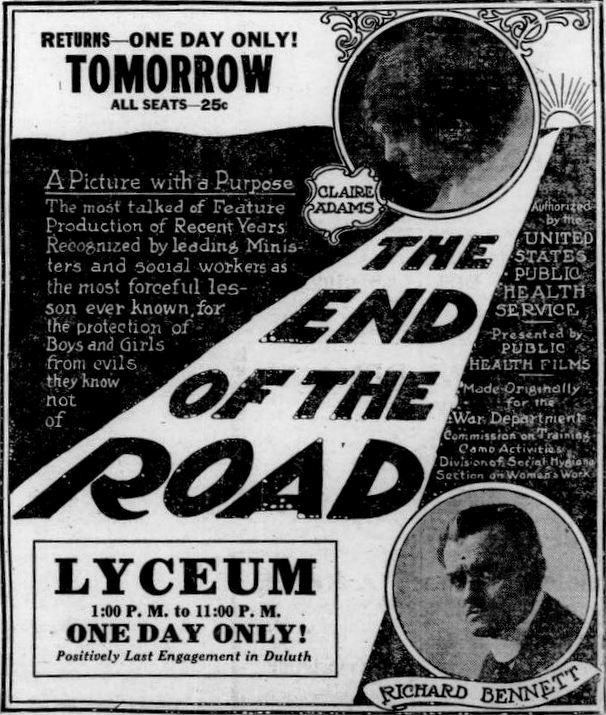
Advertisement for The End of the Road, one of the anti-VD films created by the CTCA

The CTCA produced two feature length silent dramas relating to sexual hygiene in 1917, both directed by Edward H. Griffith: Fit to Fight and The End of the Road. Fit to Fight was screened for more than one million military men during the war. The End of the Road was aimed at women, and was screened privately for women's groups in the US.

After the war, the CTCA gave the rights to the films to the American Sexual Health Association, which screened them commercially (Fit to Fight was edited and released under the new title Fit to Win) through the distributor Public Health Films. The films were controversial upon public release, facing censorship attempts and criticism for their graphic imagery and mentions of prophylaxis. The backlash faced by The End of the Road and Fit to Win, along with a cohort of other 1919 sex hygiene films, ultimately led to more studio censorship and were a factor in the emergence of exploitation films as a distinct niche.

== Modern historians' opinions ==
World War I propaganda poster for enlistment in the U.S. Army

For native-born and foreign-born troops, the result was portrayed as allowing these citizens to retain their cultures while integrating into American culture. Although a stated aim of the CTCA was to establish adequate recreational facilities for troops in camps, studies have demonstrated its programs sought to control soldiers' and women's sex lives to prevent venereal diseases and to uphold social morality. The CTCA has been portrayed as "one of the last stands of an older generation of moral reformers against the onrush of a liberalizing sexual culture". Historian Eric Wycoff Rogers, however, argues the agency used sexuality and sexual denial to motivate soldiers to fight harder. Their efforts have been described as both altruistic and propagating conservative social ideology.

== See also ==
- Chamberlain–Kahn Act
- John T. McCutcheon
- Kate Waller Barrett
- Library War Service
- Paul Popenoe
- Peter W. Dykema
- United States in World War I
