= The End of the Road (1919 film) =

1919 American silent film

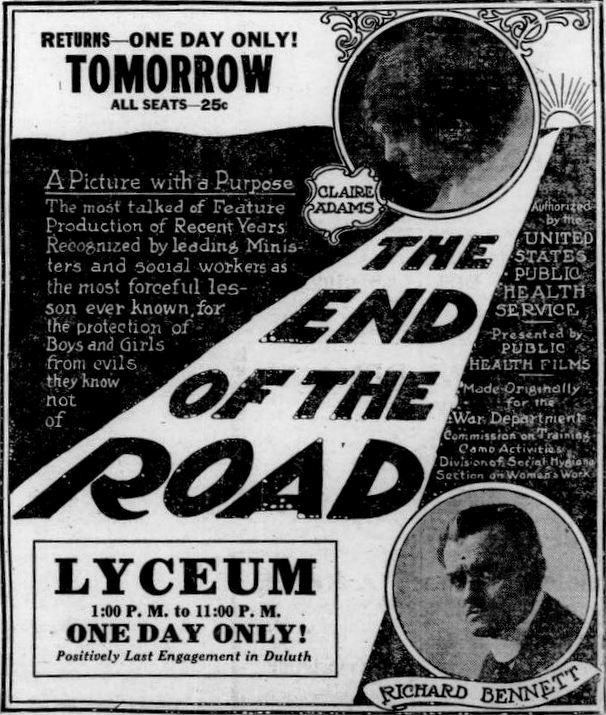
- Newspaper advertisement for film
- Directed by: Edward H. Griffith
- Written by: Edward H. Griffith
- Screenplay by: Katharine Bement Davis
- Produced by: American Social Hygiene Association
- Starring: Richard Bennett; Claire Adams
- Production company: American Social Hygiene Association/Famous Players–Lasky/United States Department of War
- Distributed by: Public Health Films
- Release date: February 16, 1919
- Running time: 7 reels
- Country: United States
- Language: Silent (English intertitles)

The End of the Road is a 1919 American silent drama film produced by the American Social Hygiene Association. The film was directed by Lieutenant Edward H. Griffith for the purposes of health propaganda. The plot follows the lives of two young women - one raised by "the right kind of mother" and the other by a mother that is judged to be wrong. This film was targeted at young women with warnings about premarital sex and venereal disease and was notably produced during World War I.

A complete restoration of the film has been created by the National Film Preservation Foundation and may be viewed online.

== Plot ==
As described with colorful language in a film magazine, Mary Lee (Adams), at the age of seven, is told the truth about life by her mother. Vera Lynch (Fair), her playmate, is deceived by her parents in the approved manner. At graduation time Mary is sought in marriage by Paul Horton, but she puts him off to study nursing. Vera's mother sends her off to New York City with instructions to make a money marriage. Mary also goes to New York City to work in a hospital and becomes acquainted with Dr. Bell, who falls in love with her. They rescue Vera from a drunken companion on one occasion, but are unable to prevent her from accepting the unlawful love of the same wealthy young man later on. When she develops a loathsome disease, they ensure that she receives proper medical care. Dr. Bell and Mary go to France for the war in the medical service. Paul Horton previously had made a disgraceful proposition to Mary, and she now accepts Dr. Bell's proposal of marriage. There are numerous subplots involving other characters in the film.

== Cast ==
- Richard Bennett as the Doctor
- Claire Adams as Mary Lee
- Joyce Fair as Vera Lynch
- Raymond McKee
- Maude Hill
- Robert Cain
- Arthur Housman
- Alice Brady
- Helen Ferguson

== Production and release ==
The End of the Road was sponsored by the Commission on Training Camp Activities (CTCA), a US agency created in 1917 with the primary goal of reducing the spread of venereal disease among US troops. The CTCA produced another film with an anti-VD message, Fit to Fight (later released to the public as Fit to Win), aimed at a male audience.

The film was directed by Edward H. Griffith, who was then director of motion pictures for CTCA. Its writer, Katharine Bement Davis, was a sociologist and director of the Committee on Protective Work for Girls, under the United States Department of War. It was filmed on the Rockefeller family estate in Pocantico Hills, New York by US army cameramen.

The End of the Road was originally intended to be screened for small private audiences of women such as church groups or at YWCAs, with a lecturer speaking through the viewing and guiding discussion, and it was exhibited in this way during the war. After the war, the CTCA allowed the film to be commercially exhibited to the public, through agreements with the American Social Hygiene Association and Public Health Films.

== Reception and censorship ==
The End of the Road was a popular success, but was subject to censorship efforts. The film was banned in Pennsylvania, and the National Association of the Motion Picture Industry ran a campaign attempting to have it banned from Chicago. Reviewers criticized "the graphic nature" of the film, which included depictions of syphilitic lesions.

== See also ==
- List of sex hygiene films
