= Katharine Bement Davis =

American criminologist and social reformer

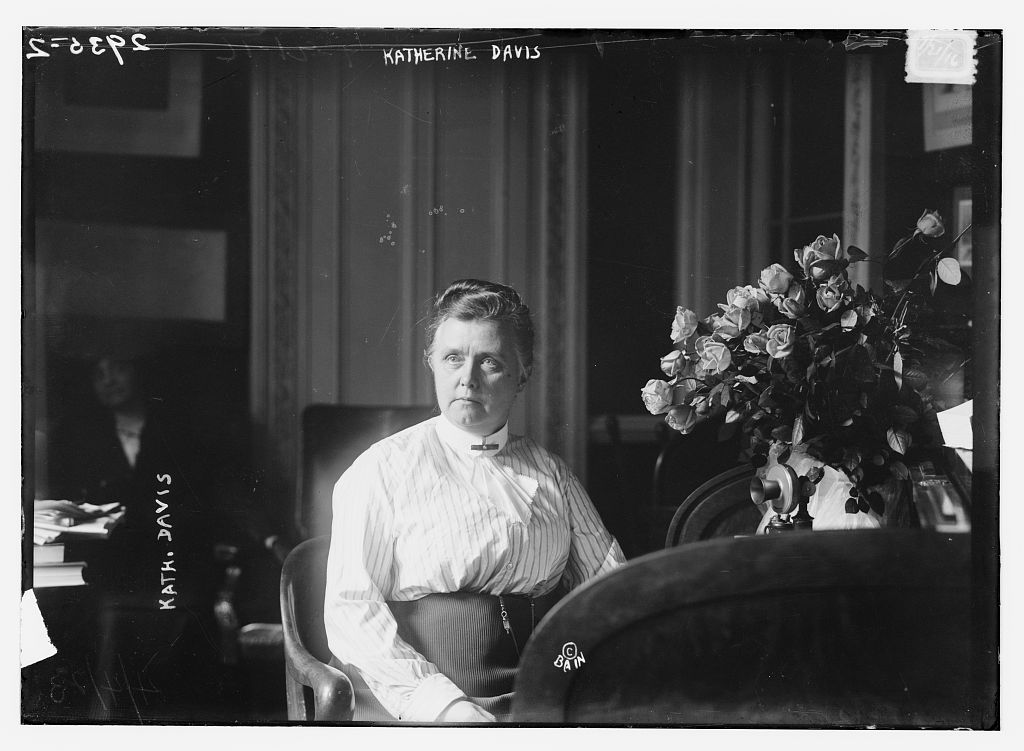
- Davis in 1913
- Born: January 15, 1860; Buffalo, New York
- Died: December 10, 1935 (aged 75); Pacific Grove, California
- Education: Rochester Free Academy; Vassar College; Barnard College; University of Chicago
- Occupations: Progressive Era social reformer and criminologist
- Employer(s): Dunkirk Academy, Brooklyn Heights Seminary for Girls, Philadelphia's College Settlement House, New York State Reformatory for Women, New York City Department of Correction, New York City Bureau of Social Hygiene
- Known for: Correction Commissioner; the first woman to head a major New York City agency; research in female sexuality
- Parent(s): Oscar Bill Davis and Frances Freeman
- Relatives: Two brothers, two sisters
- Awards: Designated "one of the three most distinguished women in America" by the Panama-Pacific Exposition; honorary degrees from Mount Holyoke College, Western Reserve and Yale

Katharine Bement Davis (January 15, 1860 – December 10, 1935) was an American Progressive Era social reformer and criminologist who became the first woman to head a major New York City agency when she was appointed Correction Commissioner on January 1, 1914. Davis was a former school teacher from upstate New York, who later became one of the nation's first female doctorates when she received her Ph.D. in economics from the University of Chicago in 1901. Davis was also known for her work as an American penologist and a writer who had a long-lasting effect on American penal reform in the late 19th and early 20th centuries.

Katharine Bement David was designated as one of the three most distinguished women in America by the Panama-Pacific Exposition, alongside Zelia Nuttall and Jane Addams. Davis was also remembered for her pioneering science-based prison reform and groundbreaking research about female sexuality. She was also the first woman to run for a New York statewide office on a major party ticket, on the Progressive party's 1914 slate for State Constitutional Convention seat. For her relief work during the 1908 Messina earthquake, she was honored with the Red Cross Medal presented to her by President Taft, receiving honors also from Pope Pius X and from King Victor Emmanuel.

== Biography ==
She was born in Buffalo, New York, on January 15, 1860, to Oscar Bill Davis and Frances Freeman. She was the oldest of five children—three girls and two boys. Katharine's mother Frances was a strong proponent of women's rights and a zealous advocate for women's suffrage.

The Davis family lived in Dunkirk, New York, during most of her childhood. Both of her parents were active in community organizations in Dunkirk. Oscar Davis worked for Bradstreet company, and when Katharine was seventeen he relocated to Rochester, New York, to manage a regional office there.

=== Education and early careers ===
In 1879, Davis graduated from Rochester Free Academy, a public high school. Since her family was unable to afford the tuition for college, she taught at Dunkirk Academy. There she established a women's equality club and led a women's literacy group.

After teaching high school chemistry for ten years, Davis saved enough money to continue her schooling full-time. In 1890, she enrolled in Vassar College, a center of progressive education for women. Davis combined her interests in science and social reform by studying food chemistry and nutritional studies. Taking this course of study gave Davis the opportunity for a career in a public health agency after graduation.

After graduating from Vassar, Davis continued her studies at Columbia University's Barnard College, a separate women's college within the university, while teaching at Brooklyn Heights Seminary for Girls. She continued studying the chemistry of food.

While studying at Barnard, Davis managed a project to develop a model home for New York State's display at the Chicago World Fair. As a result of the success of the home display, she was offered a job running a settlement house in Philadelphia.

=== Philadelphia's College Settlement House ===
The settlement house movement began in the late 19th century to socialize the poor and uneducated residents that occupied immigrant neighborhoods in a city to American values and customs. In the United States, "college settlements" were run by young women graduates of progressive colleges who as "workers" moved into a neighborhood house in order to Americanize the local residents.

The College Settlement on Philadelphia's St. Mary's Street served a district of indigent blacks and Russian immigrants. Davis moved into the house as "head worker". While in Philadelphia, Davis worked with W. E. B. Du Bois, who was then at the University of Pennsylvania conducting groundbreaking research on blacks in urban America. Davis noted in the Settlement's annual report that "the investigation into the condition of the colored people of . . . the seventh ward which contains about 10,000 Negroes, nearly one fourth the entire number in the city" would be carried out "by means of house-to-house canvass."

=== Chicago ===
Davis first began her journey to Chicago in 1893 when she directed a diet and living standard exhibit in the World's Columbian Exposition in Chicago. In 1897, Davis quit her job at the Philadelphia College Settlement House and moved to Chicago, Illinois. Here she attended the University of Chicago, where she was the first female Fellow in Political Science-Economics to earn a Ph.D. Davis studied political economy under Thorstein Veblen and minored in sociology under George E. Vincent. She also received a traveling fellowship, in which she went to Berlin and Vienna. Davis earned her Ph.D. in economics in 1901 and decided to take the New York civil service exam. Shen then took a job at Bedford Hills Reformatory.

== Corrections career ==
=== Bedford Hills Reformatory ===
The New York State Reformatory for Women at Bedford Hills, New York, opened in May 1901 with Davis as the superintendent. Educating and giving more opportunities to women was her primary goal as she believed that a lack of opportunity drove women to criminal and immoral activities. Davis was in favor of arresting suspected prostitutes and had little regard for whether an innocent women would be wrongfully accused. Besides the administration building, the campus included "a reception hall, four cottages, a laundry building, a powerhouse, a gate house, and a stable". The reception hall had two wings, one wing modeled after a traditional prison with three tiers of 24 cells each, and the other wing contained rooms accommodating 42 inmates. The women at Bedford ranged in ages of sixteen to thirty; they had been arrested for various reasons such as prostitution or public intoxication. When Davis began working at Bedford, approximately one quarter of the women were non-native, but by the end of her career African-American women made up one fifth of the population. In the beginning Davis fashioned the reformatory to be more likely a boarding school than a prison, as she wanted to help women start a new life. However, when she saw more offenders, she began to associate immorality with criminality and mental capacity; this lead her to a eugenicist line of thinking.

=== Pre-sentencing evaluations ===
In 1909, Davis arranged for the New York Public Education Association to do a psychological study at Bedford. Davis believed that the results of her tests indicated more "mental deficiencies" in delinquent women. The physiological tests did not take into account the education levels of the inmates. In 1910, Davis advocated for judges to have access to pre-sentencing background research and evaluations so that they could make appropriate placements. Because Davis associated mental deficiency with criminality, she posited that criminals should serve life rather than set sentences for each crime. She gave the inmates indeterminate sentences so they would have hope for the future and change but she would keep them separate from society. In 1913, Davis wrote up her ideas in a pamphlet, A Rational Plan for the Treatment of Women Convicted in the Courts of New York City, that was widely distributed to people affiliated with criminal justice system in New York City. Davis left Bedford in 1914 when Mayor John Purroy Mitchel selected Davis to head the Correction Commission making her the first woman to lead an agency in New York City. Based on her role in the suffragist community and position as commissioner, Davis was on the Progressive party's 1914 slate for State Constitutional Convention seat, making her the first woman to run for a New York statewide office on a major party ticket.

== Bureau of Social Hygiene ==
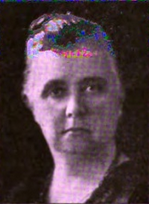
Davis in 1919

The Bureau of Social Hygiene in New York City was an agency incorporated by John D. Rockefeller Jr. in 1913 for "the study, amelioration, and prevention of those social conditions, crimes, and diseases which adversely affect the well-being of society, with special reference to prostitution and the evils associated therewith." Rockefeller established the agency as a result of his appointment in 1911 to a special grand jury to investigate white slavery in New York City. The Bureau's work was influenced by the view that there was a biological basis for crime. During the Bureau's early years the main focus was on prostitution, vice, and political corruption. During later years, the Bureau shifted its emphasis towards criminology. The Bureau stopped granting new appropriations in 1934, and by 1937, all prior commitments were completed.

When the Bureau was first launched, Davis served as a member of the Bureau's first advisory board. In 1918 Davis became the head of the Bureau. It would be due to Davis that the Bureau would slowly become interested in sexual behavior. It is at this point that Rockefeller would become less involved in the Bureau. In 1927, Rockefeller would terminate Davis's employment due to the direction in which the Bureau was going. Davis had hoped to continue work at the Bureau until her age of retirement, but Rockefeller made it clear that there was no room in the Bureau for her. The reason for her firing from the Bureau is not fully understood, but it was clear that her growing non-judgmental attitude towards sex and her desire to turn the Bureau into a research organization to study human sexuality was off-putting to Rockefeller and his male advisors. Gender discrimination in the organization played an important role as many male colleagues under her disliked her and some even actively sought to end her leadership.

=== Sexuality research ===
During the 1910s, Davis was a proponent of strict moral standards regarding sex. She criticized men and women for engaging in nonmarital sex and even supported the federal government's crusade against prostitution and the spread of sexually transmitted diseases. Therefore, women's sexual misconducts would be the main focus of Davis's early research. However, by the 1920s, Davis's focus shifted to examine actual sexual behaviors. At the Bureau of Social Hygiene, Davis arranged for ground-breaking research on the sexuality of "normal" females. Around 5000 women, whose names were found from club memberships directories and college alumnae lists, were asked to participate in the research. They were surveyed about "auto-erotic practices, the frequency of sexual desire, homosexual experiences, use of contraceptives, frequency of sexual intercourse, and pre-marital and extra-marital sexual experiences." The results of this research would help her compile and publish Factors in the Sex Life of Twenty-Two Hundred Women in 1929. Scandalous for the time, it contested the Victorian notion of female "passionlessness" and shocked readers due to its liberal discussion of masturbation. More than two decades later, Davis's work would influence Dr. Alfred Kinsey's research. In 1921, Davis co-founded the National Research Council’s Committee for Research on the Problems of Sex to further study human sexuality. Overall, today Katherine Bement Davis is known to be one of the most influential people when it comes to research regarding human sexuality and sex.

=== Eugenics ===
Compulsory sterilization was seen by many as a way to reduce the incidence of mental illness and mental retardation in the general population of the United States. Davis was a eugenicist and during her tenure as General Secretary, she affiliated the Bureau with leaders in the field of eugenics such as Harry Laughlin, Charles Davenport and E. S. Gosney, director of The Human Betterment Foundation in California. Due to Davis's focus on morals, she would increasingly go towards eugenic explanations for criminality and immorality. Davis was not always leaning towards eugenics however, she first gave equal weighting to heredity and environment, describing the two as "hopelessly entangled." In 1909, Davis would show her support of eugenics as she warned of "bad heredity" was the cause of problems made by "moral imbeciles." Davis would soon equate "moral inbeciles" with mental incapacity. She would soon believe that treatment should fit the criminal and not the crime. Since, to her, intelligence was fixed and inheritable, she started to believe that some offenders should be confined for life in custodial institutions. In 1924, Davis accepted a position on the Committee on Eugenics of the United States' Advisory Council.

=== Retirement ===
Back in 1928, Katherine Bement Davis was not able to continue her activities due to her worsened health, in regards to her gallbladder specifically. Consequently, by the year of 1928, she retired from the Bureau of Social Hygiene. After her retirement, she was honored for her contributions. Consequently, on February 2, 1928, the Waldorf-Astoria ballroom was filled with Progressive Era reformers to honor Davis at a testimonial dinner. The guests including Eleanor Roosevelt, Jane Addams, Carrie Chapman Catt, Rev. Harry Emerson Fosdick, Walter Lippman, Judge William McAdoo, John D. Rockefeller Jr., Lillian Wald and Felix Warburg.

== Later life, death, and legacy ==
During her lifetime Davis was honored numerous times by a variety of organizations. The Panama-Pacific Exposition designated her one of the three most distinguished women in America. With this she was invited to an exposition, and there became known for her lectures. Davis also received honorary degrees from Mount Holyoke College, Western Reserve and Yale universities.

Davis's research on female sexuality and her founding of the United States' first committee for studying sexual behaviors made her a pioneering sexologist during a time when Victorian standards of sexuality was being challenged.

Davis retired to Pacific Grove, California, with her sisters. She died in her home, on December 10, 1935, from cerebral arteriosclerosis and complications with her heart and gallbladder.

King Victor Emmanuel and the Pope gave honor to Davis for providing aid to refugees of the 1908 Italian earthquake. In Palermo, a system of road she sponsored is named after her.

Throughout her life, Davis was an advocate for social reforms. A poll in 1921 sponsored by the League of Women Voters would name her of the twelve greatest living Americans of her sex.

== Selected works ==
- (1925) A Study of Certain Auto-Erotic Practices
- (1929) Factors in the Sex Life of Twenty-Two Hundred Women

== See also ==
- The End of the Road (1919)
