= Olive Templeton =

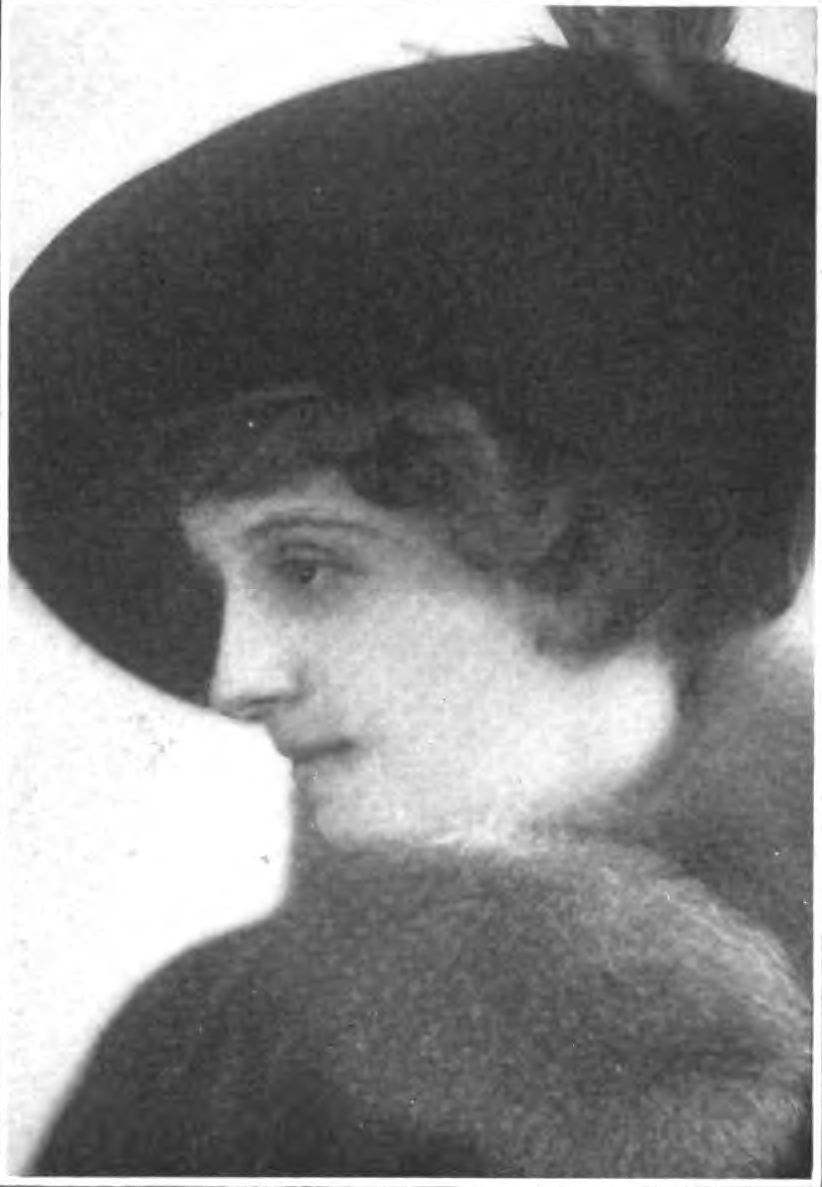
- Born: October 19, 1883
- Died: May 29, 1979 (aged 95); New York City

Olive Templeton (October 19, 1883 – May 29, 1979) was an American stage, television, and film actress.

Olive Templeton was born Olive MacMackin, on October 19, 1883.

She made her stage debut in the 1899 touring production of Ibsen's Peer Gynt. She went on to appear in numerous stage productions and several silent films. In 1919, she married John L. Flannery, who died in 1937. After her marriage, she retired from the stage, but returned to acting in the 1940s. She appeared in productions of The Philadelphia Story (1946), Chekov's Uncle Vanya (1956), and alongside Ethel Merman in The Swan (1945) and Happy Hunting (1955).

Templeton starred in a number of television programs, including Playhouse 90, Goodyear Television Playhouse, Lux Video Theatre, and Armstrong Circle Theatre. She had a recurring role on Mister Peepers and was on the original cast of Leave It to Larry before she and most of the others were replaced.

Olive Templeton died on May 29, 1979 in New York City.

== Filmography ==
- Damaged Goods (1914)
- His Sad Awakening (1915)
- An Innocent Thief (1915)
- Jack Kennard, Coward (1915)
