= Fit to Fight (film) =

1919 film by Edward H. Griffith

- Directed by: Edward H. Griffith
- Written by: Edward H. Griffith
- Production company: Commission on Training Camp Activities
- Distributed by: Public Health Films
- Release date: March 2, 1919
- Country: United States
- Language: Silent

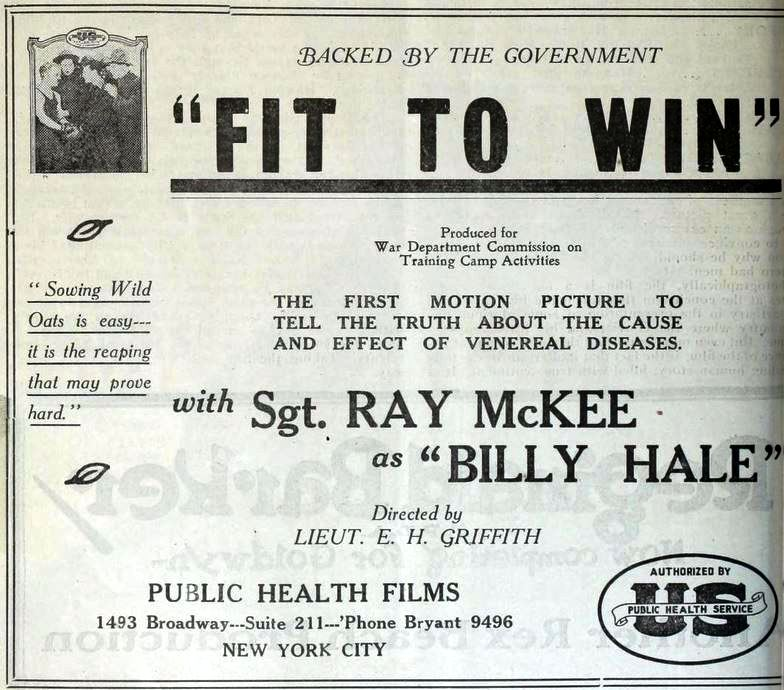
An advertisement for Fit to Win in The Film Daily

Fit to Fight is a silent sex hygiene film about the dangers of venereal disease written and directed by Edward H. Griffith. It was produced by the Commission on Training Camp Activities (making it the first film to be produced by the US government) and initially shown to American World War I soldiers. After the war, a slightly edited version was commercially released to the public in 1919, under the title Fit to Win. The film proved controversial due to its graphic imagery and its limited support for prophylaxis. It was subject to censorship attempts, and contributed to the emergence of the exploitation film as a distinct niche.

It tells the story of five recruits who exhibit varying degrees of compliance with the sexual health advice given to them at training camp and suffer corresponding consequences. The three men who have contact with prostitutes without seeking immediate medical treatment suffer venereal disease symptoms of varying severity. Ultimately, Billy, the only man who completely avoids contact with a prostitute, is held up as a model of ideal behaviour, and receives the admiration of his peers.

No footage from the film survives today.

== Plot ==
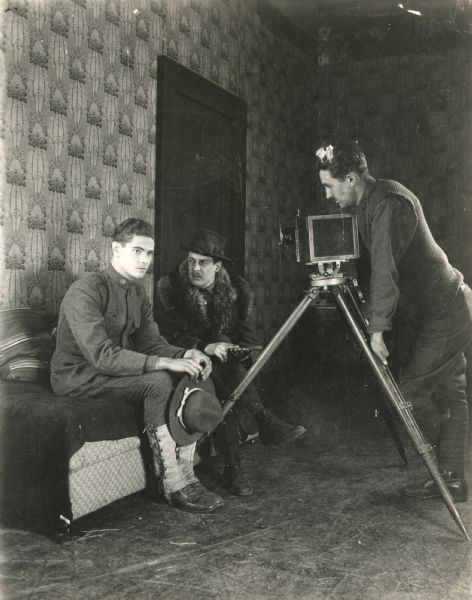
A production still from the film showing Paul Kelly as Hank Simpson, sitting with director Edward H. Griffith

The film begins with a prologue (comprising 1,000 feet of film), showing photographs of the lesions caused by venereal disease, before entering into the main story.

The film's story follows five men drafted into World War I:

- Billy Hale (played by Sgt. Raymond McKee), a college football quarterback
- Chick Carlton (played by Harry Gripp), a college student from a wealthy family
- Kid McCarthy, a boxer and womanizer given to drink
- Hank Simpson (played by Paul Kelly), a simple farm boy
- Jack Garvin, a cosmopolitan cigar salesman

The five of them attend the same training camp. At the camp, they receive a lecture on the dangers of venereal disease, with varying reactions. Later the men travel to a nearby town and drink bootlegged liquor. They are solicited by prostitutes; Billy declines, but the other four follow the women into a brothel. Hank goes no further than a kiss, but the other three engage in intercourse. Kid McCarthy heads immediately to the camp's prophylaxis station to receive a chemical prophylaxis, recalling the earlier instructions of their lecturer. Jack visits the station the next day, and Chick never goes.

All the men other than Billy and Kid McCarthy subsequently suffer from some degree of venereal disease. Chick, who never sought treatment at the prophylaxis station, suffers a bad case of gonorrhea which eventually leaves him physically disabled. Jack and Hank are both infected with syphilis, with Hank bearing a lesion on his lip as a result of the kiss.

Kid McCarthy taunts Billy, accusing him of being too cowardly to patronize a prostitute. Billy knocks McCarthy out with a punch, telling him that he is "not a coward because he won't go with a dirty slut". McCarthy sees the error in his ways, and he and the rest of the men at the camp gain a new respect for Billy's chastity.

The film ends with Billy and Kid McCarthy saluting Sandy Hook as they're transported overseas to fight for the US, while the other three men are shown confined to hospital.

The commercially released Fit to Win adds an epilogue to the end of the film, taking place after the war. In the epilogue, Kid McCarthy has been killed in service. Billy Hale returns home and delivers McCarthy's medal for bravery to his girlfriend. He visits with Jack and Hank, who had both been infected with syphilis. He tells them that they are now likely cured, and advises them to avoid prostitutes in the future. Chick Carlton, who had been infected with gonorrhea, is shown at home with his distraught parents. In the end, Billy marries his sweetheart.

== Production and release ==
Fit to Fight was produced by the Commission on Training Camp Activities (CTCA). It was written and directed by Edward H. Griffith (who, at the time, had the rank of lieutenant), and photographic work was performed by the Army Medical Museum's instruction laboratory.

The film was initially screened only for US soldiers. After the war, the CTCA transferred the rights for the film (along with another CTCA production, The End of the Road) to the American Social Hygiene Association (ASHA). The ASHA reached an agreement with Isaac Silverman's Public Health Films to distribute the films to American theatres, with ASHA to receive 25% of the profits.

Fit to Win initially had the support of the US Public Health Service. Assistant surgeon general C. C. Pierce issued a letter requesting that state and local governments provide the film forbearance from their normal censorship practices, given its educational value. As part of Public Health Films' release strategy, screenings would be segregated by sex, and forbidden to children under 16. It was released on March 2, 1919.

== Reception ==
The release of Fit to Win (along with a similar CTCA production aimed at a female audience, The End of the Road) marked a turning point in how sex hygiene films were received in the United States. Whereas previous films in the genre had been generally well received by critics and praised for their delicate handling of the topic of venereal disease, Fit to Win faced denunciation and censorship attempts from many sides.

US surgeon general Rupert Blue announced in a September 1919 ad in The Moving Picture World that:

the Public Health Service has withdrawn its indorsement of the films, Fit to Win, End of the Road, and Open Your Eyes, and all other pictures dealing with venereal diseases that have been shown or are to be shown commercially.

The film was condemned by the Catholic Church and conservative social hygienists for its advocacy of chemical prophylaxis (albeit as a last resort).
