= Damaged Goods (1914 film) =

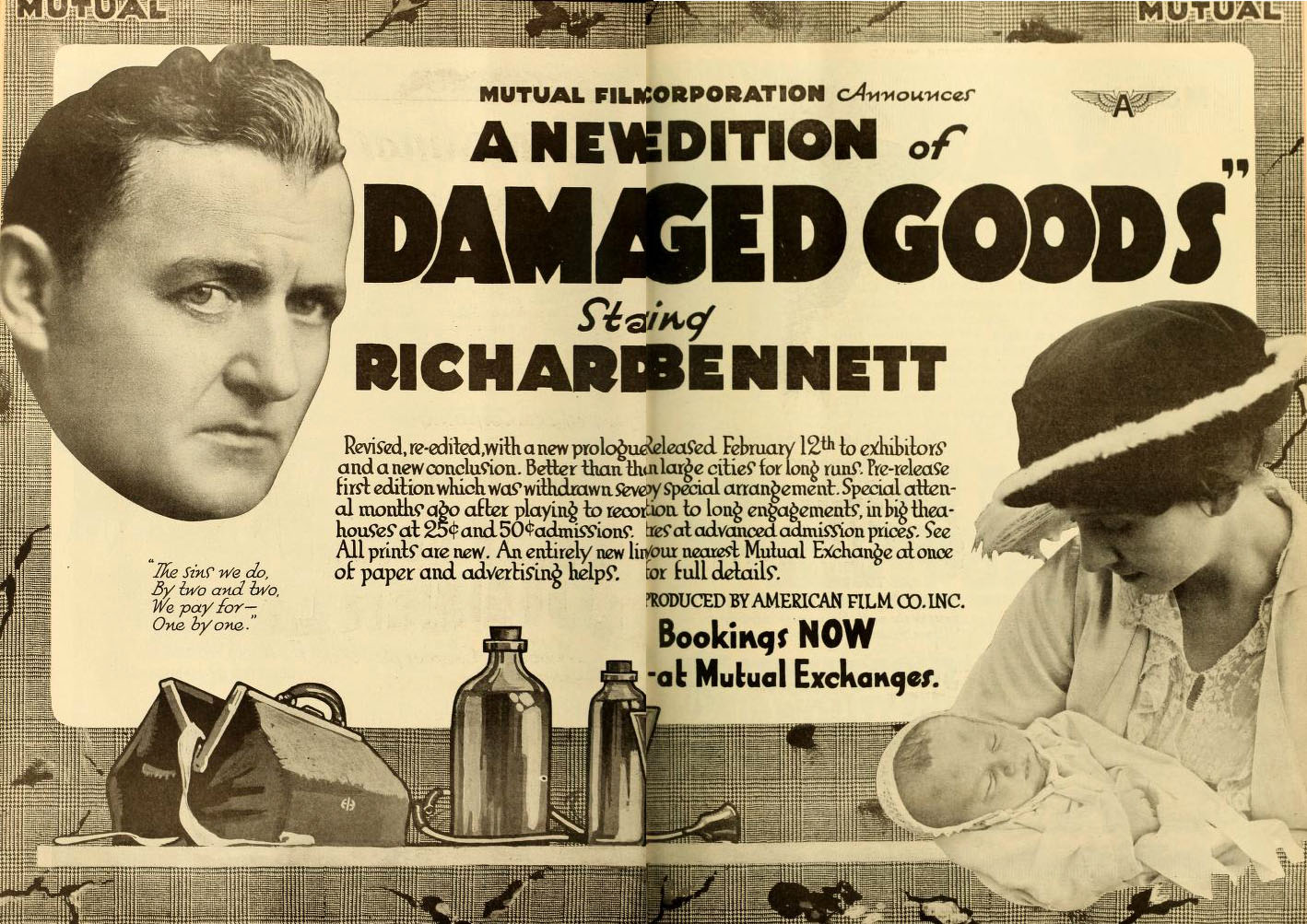
- Advertisement for the 1917 edition
- Directed by: Tom Ricketts
- Written by: Harry A. Pollard (adaptation)
- Based on: Les Avariés by Eugène Brieux
- Starring: Richard Bennett; Adrienne Morrison
- Cinematography: Thomas B. Middleton
- Production company: American Film Manufacturing Company
- Distributed by: Mutual Film Corporation
- Release date: September 1, 1914
- Running time: 7 reels
- Country: United States
- Language: Silent (English intertitles)

Damaged Goods (1914) is an American silent drama film directed by Tom Ricketts, starring Richard Bennett. It is based on Eugène Brieux's play Les Avariés (1901) about a young couple who contract syphilis. No print of the film is known to exist, making it a lost film, although according to the silent film survival database a fragment survives. It is believed to have begun the sex hygiene/venereal disease film craze of the 1910s.

The play was adapted into a British silent film Damaged Goods in 1919. A sound film based on the Brieux play, also titled Damaged Goods (1937) was directed by Phil Goldstone, released by Grand National Pictures.

== Cast ==
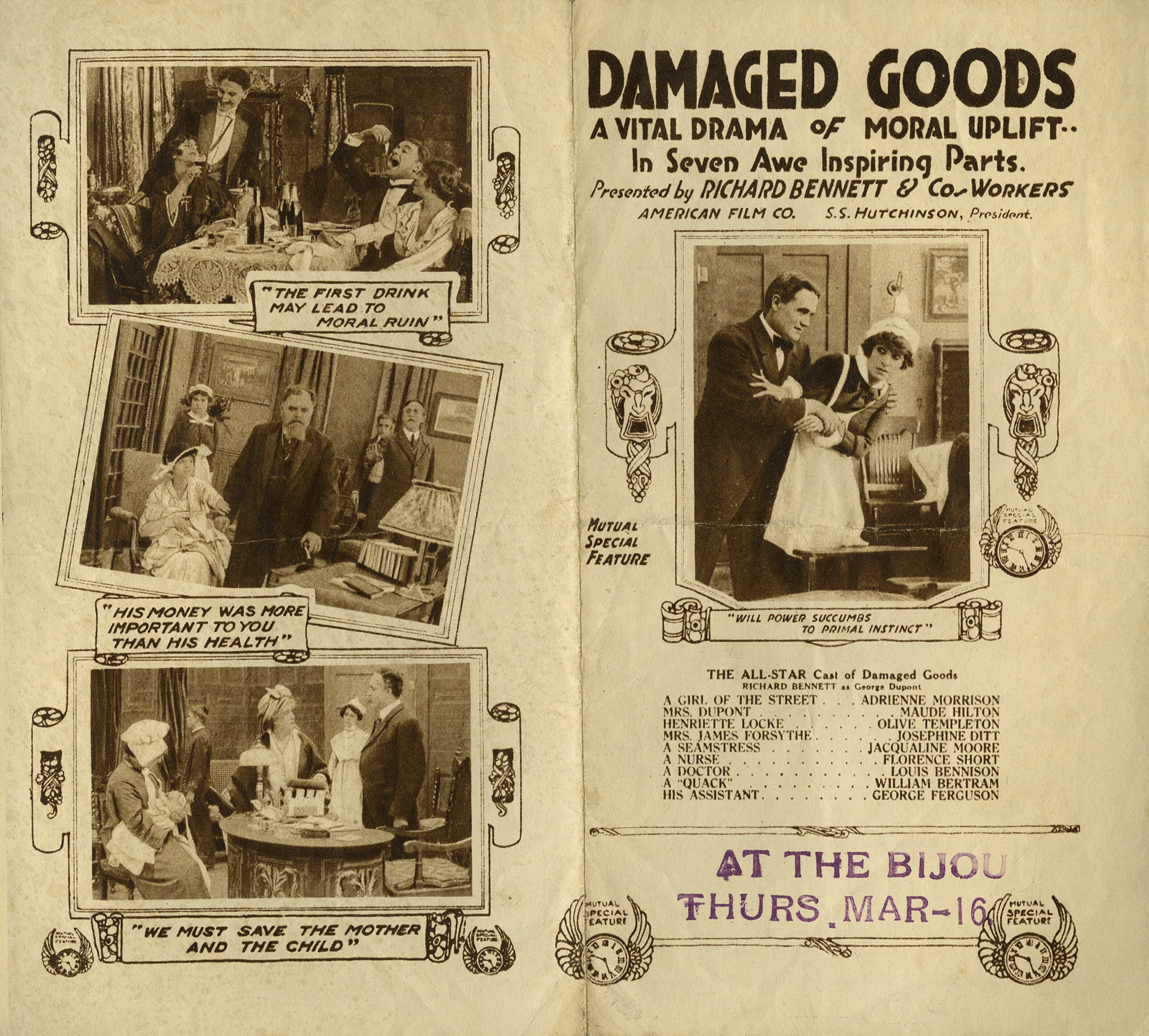

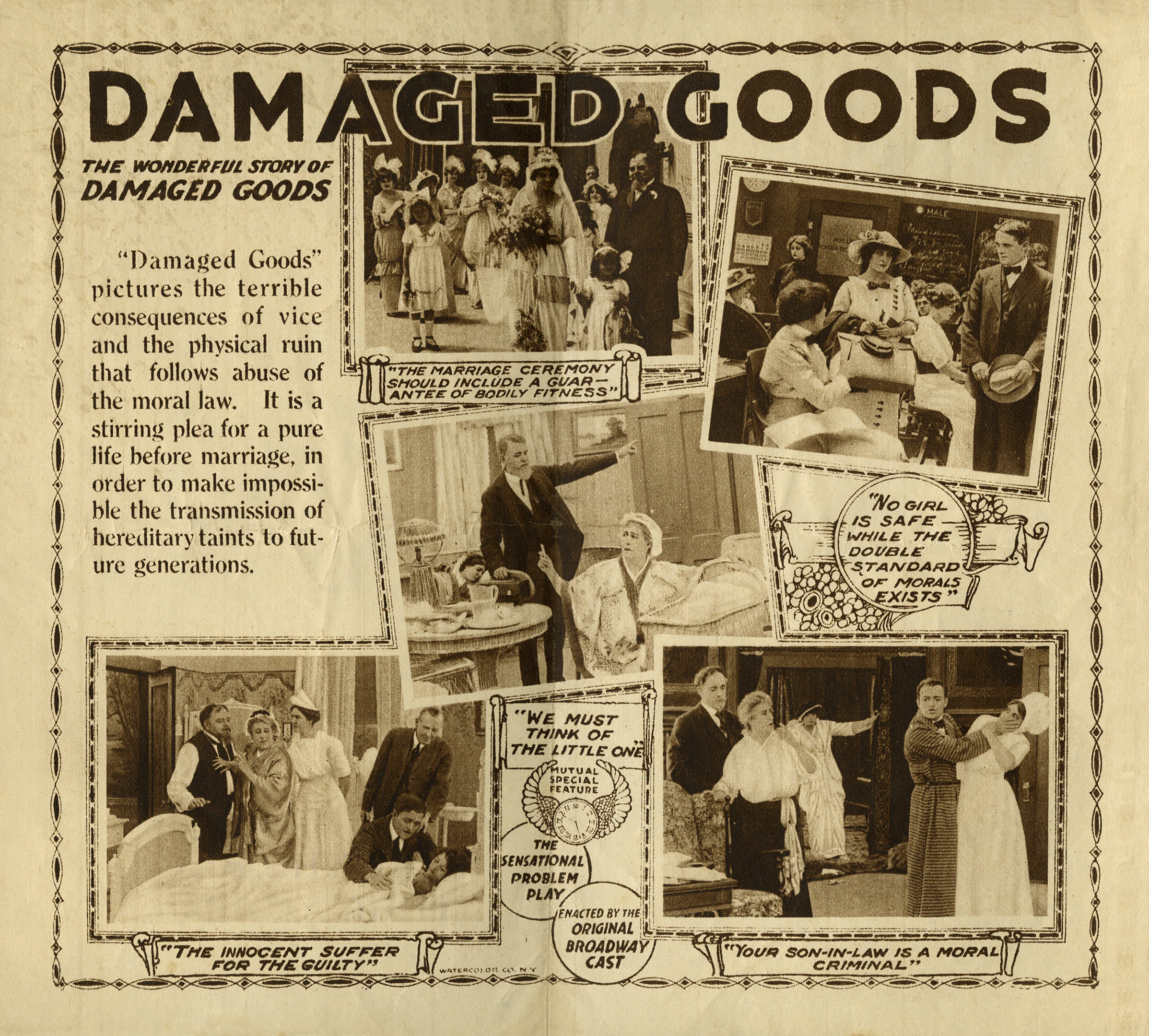
Herald for Damaged Goods (1914)

- Richard Bennett as George Dupont
- Adrienne Morrison as a Girl of the Streets
- Maud Milton as Mrs. Dupont
- Olive Templeton as Henriette Locke
- Josephine Ditt as Mrs. James Forsythe
- Jacqueline Moore as Seamstress
- Florence Short as Nurse
- Louis Bennison as Dr. Clifford
- John Steppling as Senator Locke
- William Bertram as a Quack Doctor
- George Ferguson as the Quack's Assistant
- Charlotte Burton as Mrs. Lester

== Production and release history ==
Film historian Terry Ramsaye stated that the film was "pretentiously made" for a cost of less than $50,000, including marketing, and that "its states' rights ... sold for $600,000, thus indicating a box-office take of probably more than $2,000,000". According to a 1915 account, audience demand for the film in Detroit was so great that police were required to control the crowds at the theater.

Damaged Goods was re-released in a "new edition" in 1917, perhaps in response to concerns about the spread of venereal disease among World War I soldiers. It was re-released again in 1919.

In 1929 a synchronized soundtrack was reportedly added to the film for a states' rights re-release.

== Reception ==
The film was positively received by critics. Reviews in Variety and The Moving Picture World praised it as morally salubrious.

== Censorship ==
When Damaged Goods was released in the United States, many states and cities in the United States had censor boards that could require cuts or other eliminations before the film could be shown. Although the Ohio Board of Censors had passed the film on November 14, 1927, it later revoked its permit effective June 1, 1929, ending a road show exhibition run by Albert Dezel.

== See also ==
- List of lost films
- The Fight(1915)
