= Taconic Correctional Facility =

Women's prison in Bedford, New York

Coordinates: 41.24°N 73.68°W

- Interactive map of Taconic Correctional Facility
- Location: 250 Harris Road Bedford Hills, New York
- Status: open
- Security class: medium
- Capacity: 387
- Population: 167
- Opened: 1973
- Managed by: New York State Department of Corrections and Community Supervision
- Director: Emily Williams

Taconic Correctional Facility is a medium/minimum security women's prison in Bedford, New York operated by the New York State DOCCS.

== Location ==
Taconic is located in Westchester County, approximately fifty miles north of New York City. It lies across the street from the Bedford Hills Correctional Facility, a New York State maximum security women's prison. Despite having a Bedford Hills postal address, the prison lies just outside of the Bedford Hills census-designated place. Compared to most New York State prisons, Taconic and Bedford Hills are relatively accessible by public transportation: Metro North Railroad's Harlem line has station stops about 1.5 miles away, and the Westchester County bus system serves the area.

== Incarcerated population ==
Taconic is a designated women's prison with about 170 people incarcerated in 2021, ranging from 20 to 74 years old. Despite the designation as a women's prison, there are also nonbinary people and transgender men incarcerated there. The population of 170 represents a steep decline from 2019, when there were almost twice as many as the present number, at a count of 315. As of 2021, there were more staff at Taconic than people incarcerated New York State Department of Corrections and Community Supervision, with at least 218 staff members in 2021. This is highly unusual nationwide; New York State's ratio of prison guards to incarcerated people was highest among all fifty states in 2010.

== History ==
The facility opened in 1901 as the New York State Reformatory for Women for those ages 15 to 30. Its first director was Katherine Bement Davis, a progressive politician, prison reformer, and the first woman to earn a PhD in Economics/Political Science at the University of Chicago.

The Department of Corrections took over the administration of the reformatory in 1926, and in 1933 it was merged it with the newly opened Bedford Hills Correctional Facility for Women. For the next four decades, the reformatory operated as part of Bedford Hills, still the state's only maximum-security prison for females.

In 1973, Taconic began operations as an autonomous medium-security prison. During 1971 and 1972, Bedford Hills was a correctional facility with separate male and female units. In 1973 the male inmates were transferred before the unit closed in June; the unit reopened in December as the Taconic Correctional Facility.

A cemetery on the prison's grounds has been in use since the 1920s, with about 100 graves, most of them infants and women who died at the facility. The graveyard has marked areas for Christian, Jewish and Muslim decedents. The most recent burials, in the 2010s, were for men who died while incarcerated at prisons where the graveyards had no more space for burials.
