= Richard Bennett (actor) =

American actor (1870–1944)

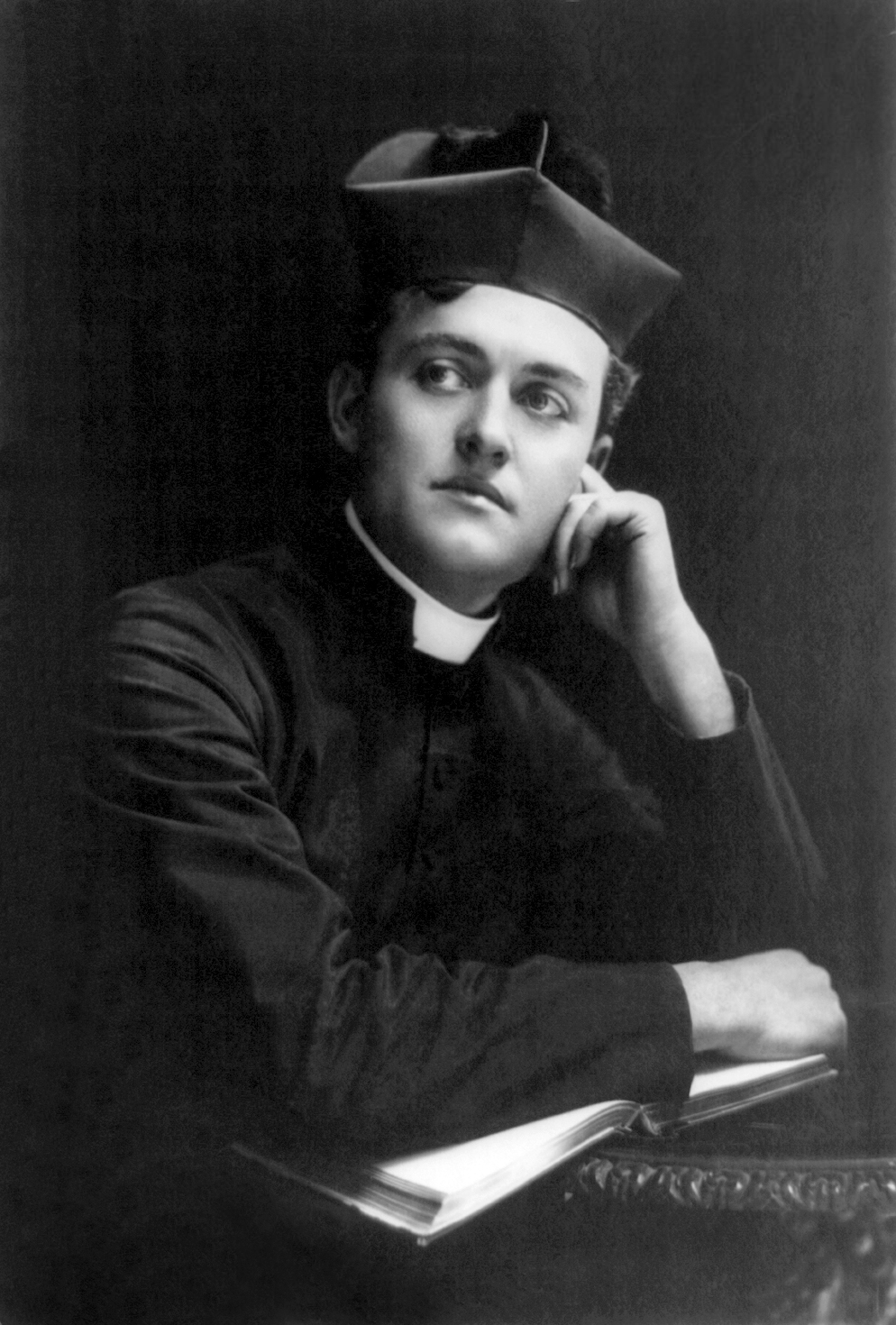
- As Father Anselm in A Royal Family; Photograph by Otto Sarony, 1900
- Born: Clarence Charles William Henry Richard Bennett; May 21, 1870; Deer Creek Township, Cass County, Indiana, U.S.
- Died: October 22, 1944 (aged 74); Los Angeles, California, U.S.
- Occupation: Actor
- Years active: 1891–1943
- Spouses: Grena Heller (m. 1901; div. 1903) Adrienne Morrison (m. 1903; div. 1925) Aimee Raisch (m. 1927; div. 1937)
- Children: Constance Bennett; Barbara Bennett; Joan Bennett
- Relatives: Morton Downey Jr. (grandson)

Clarence Charles William Henry Richard Bennett (May 21, 1870 – October 22, 1944) was an American actor who became a stage and silent screen actor over the early decades of the 20th century. He was the father of actresses Constance Bennett, Barbara Bennett and Joan Bennett with actress Adrienne Morrison, his second wife.

== Biography ==
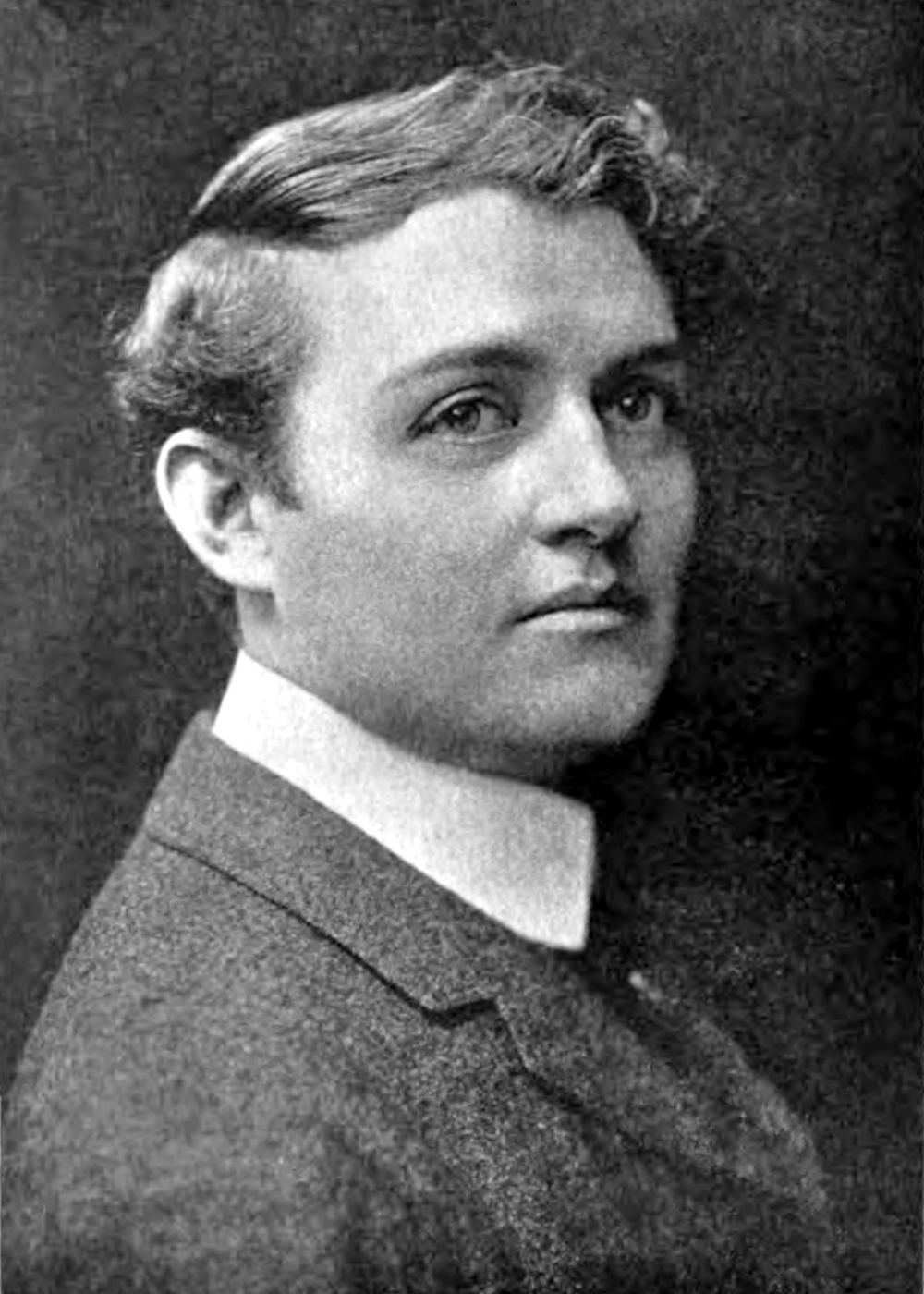
Richard Bennett in 1908

Bennett was born in Deer Creek Township, Cass County, Indiana, in May 1870. (Note: Some sources erroneously state Bennett's year of birth as 1872 or 1873. Bennett deliberately confused his year of birth and his specific place of birth, which many sources state as Deacon's Mills, Indiana. The most accurate source of information is the 1870 Federal Census.) Called Clarence until he was 10, he was the eldest child of George Washington Bennett and Eliza Leonora Bennett. His younger sister was Ina Blanche Bennett. For a time, he was a sailor on Great Lakes steamer, a professional boxer, medicine showman, troubadour and night clerk in a hotel in Chicago. Bennett made his stage debut on May 10, 1891, in Chicago, in The Limited Mail. He went to New York City, where his Broadway debut was in His Excellency the Governor (1899), which was produced by Charles Frohman. In his third Broadway production, he played the role of Father Anselm in Frohman's production of A Royal Family (1901–02).

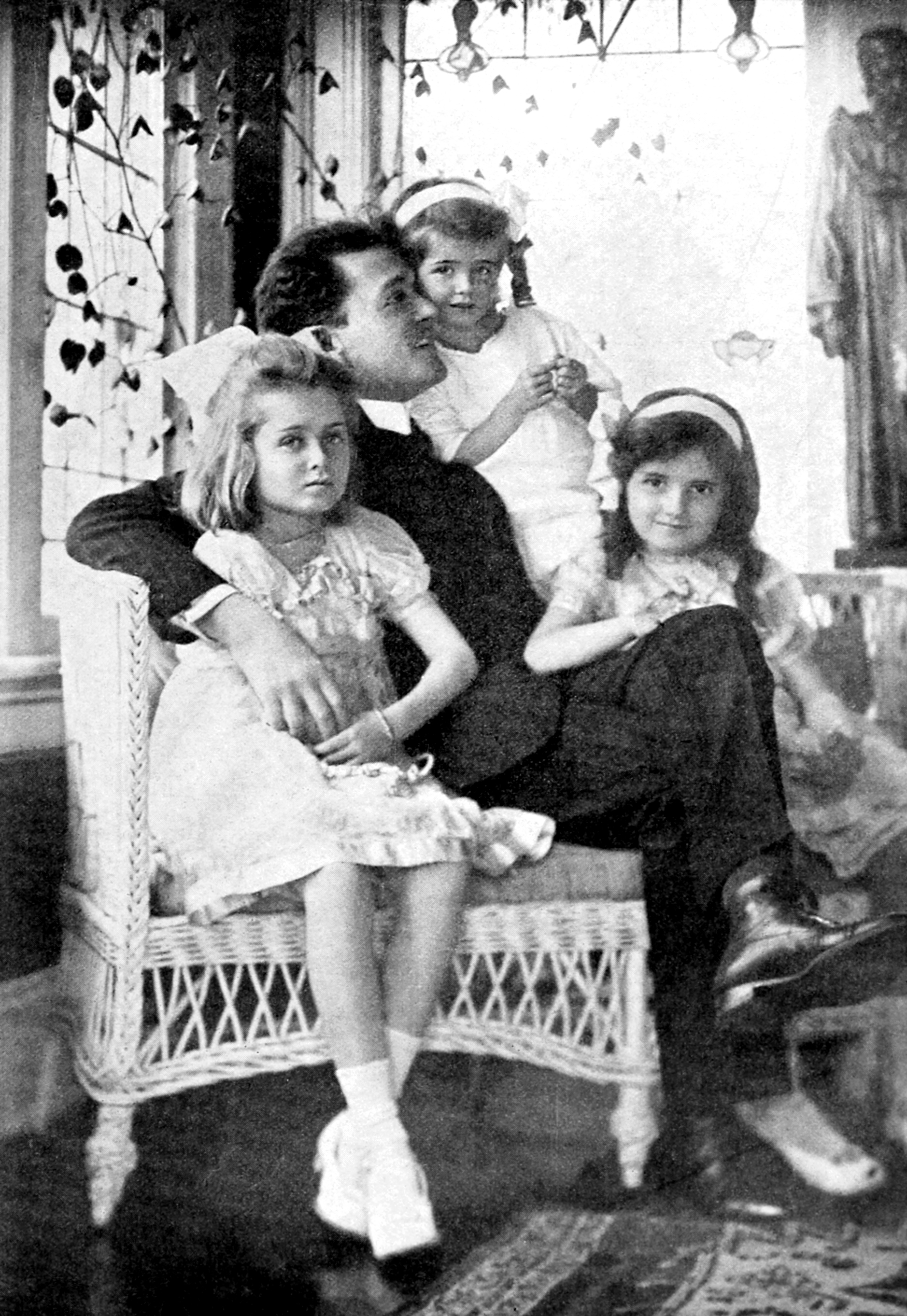
Bennett with his daughters, (from left) Constance, Joan and Barbara (1918)

Bennett was married to Grena Heller in 1901 in San Francisco. They soon separated and were divorced in 1903. Using her married name, she starred in a few plays on Broadway and went on to a successful career as a music critic for Hearst's New York American.

On November 8, 1903, Bennett and actress Adrienne Morrison were married in Jersey City. They had three daughters, all notable actresses: Constance Bennett, Barbara Bennett and Joan Bennett.

In 1905, Bennett won fame as the leading man, Hector Malone, Jr., in Shaw's Man and Superman. That was followed by his successful appearance as Jefferson Ryder in Charles Klein's hit play The Lion and the Mouse (1905).

A series of spectacular roles followed. In 1908, he played the role of John Shand opposite Maude Adams in J. M. Barrie's What Every Woman Knows. Frequent quarrels between the stars occurred during the run of the play, and when Adams opened in Peter Pan, Bennett telegraphed his congratulations "on achieving your long ambition to be your own leading man."

Bennett is also known for adapting socially conscious works of Eugène Brieux, including Maternity.

In 1913, Bennett had a theatrical success starring as Georges Dupont in the stage drama Damaged Goods, which he also co-produced. He won a reputation for his curtain harangues, which friends—and critics—said were at least as good as his stage portrayals when he wound up an appearance by stepping in front of the curtain and castigating the police and courts for "narrow-mindedness". He developed this penchant until his ab-lib speeches won greater applause than many of the plays in which he acted.

Bennett reprised his stage role for his feature film debut, Damaged Goods (1914), which co-starred his wife, Adrienne Morrison. He helped adapt the screenplay and direct the drama. In the drama The Valley of Decision (1916), which he wrote, Bennett appeared on the screen with his wife Morrison and his three daughters.

In 1922, Bennett starred in Broadway's English-language version of Leonid Andreyev's melodrama He Who Gets Slapped, playing the title role as He. The success of the play led to a film adaptation by Metro-Goldwyn-Mayer, with Lon Chaney in Bennett's role.

Bennett and Morrison appeared together on stage in the 1923 play The Dancers. They were divorced in April 1925.

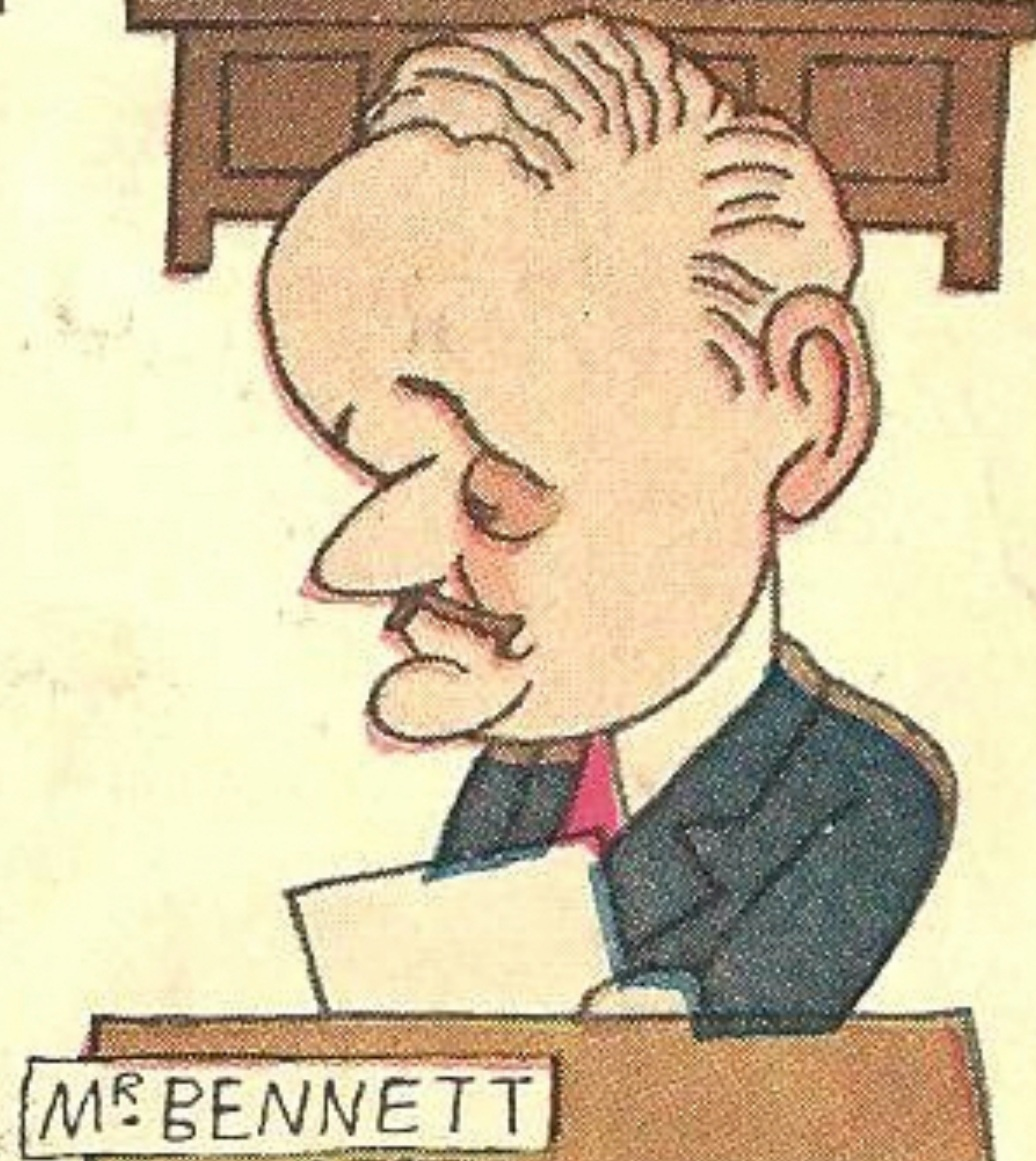
Caricature by Ralph Barton, 1925

In 1925, he became acquainted with Aimee Raisch in San Francisco, during the production of Creoles, in which she played a minor role. She was a young socialite and aspiring actress who was divorcing her millionaire clubman and polo player husband, Harry G. Hastings.

Bennett and Raisch were married on July 11, 1927, in Chicago.

His daughter Joan made her stage debut acting with Bennett in Jarnegan (1928). This play, in which he played Jack Jarnegan, provided one of his favorite roles—that of a belligerent, drunken movie director given to acidulous and profane comments on Hollywood.

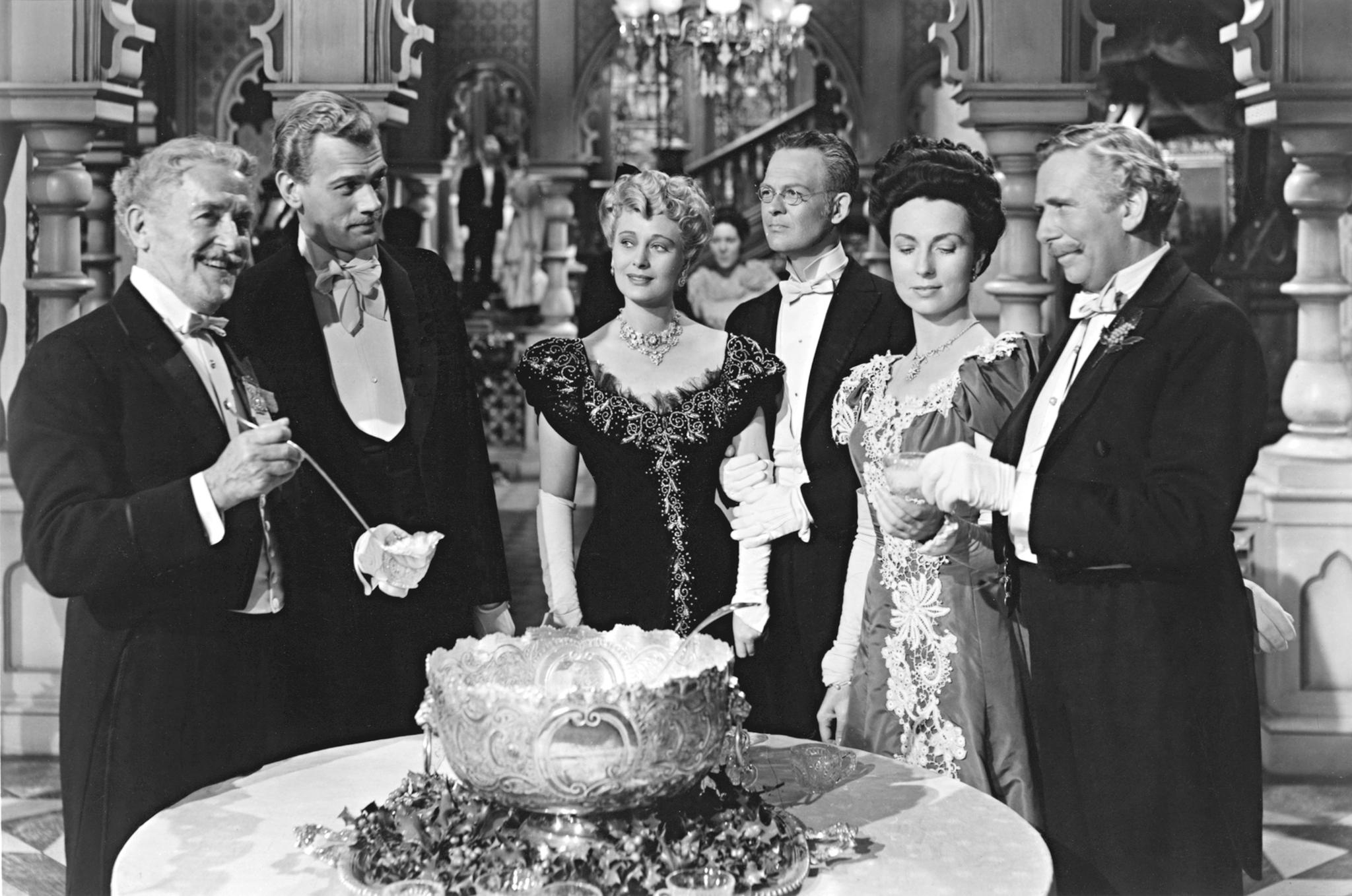
The Magnificent Ambersons (1942) Richard Bennett, Joseph Cotten, Dolores Costello, Don Dillaway, Agnes Moorehead, Ray Collins

He and Raisch separated April 3, 1934, and were divorced in 1937. (Note: Raisch died in San Francisco in 1955.)

With the advent of sound film, the middle-aged Bennett found a niche as a character actor. In 1931 he appeared with his daughter Constance Bennett in Bought. He played the dying millionaire John Glidden in the episodic If I Had a Million (1932) distributing million dollar checks to characters played by Gary Cooper, George Raft, and Charles Laughton, which also stars W. C. Fields. Bennett is probably best known for his role as Major Amberson in Orson Welles's second feature film, The Magnificent Ambersons (1942). Journey into Fear (1943), Welles's next production, was Bennett's final film.

Richard Bennett died at age 74 from a heart attack at Good Samaritan Hospital in Los Angeles. Episcopal funeral services were conducted on October 24, 1944, in Beverly Hills. He is interred in Pleasant View Cemetery, Lyme, Connecticut, beside his second wife and mother of his daughters.

Bennett was fond of saying that the movie industry was not a business, but a madhouse.

== Select theatre credits ==
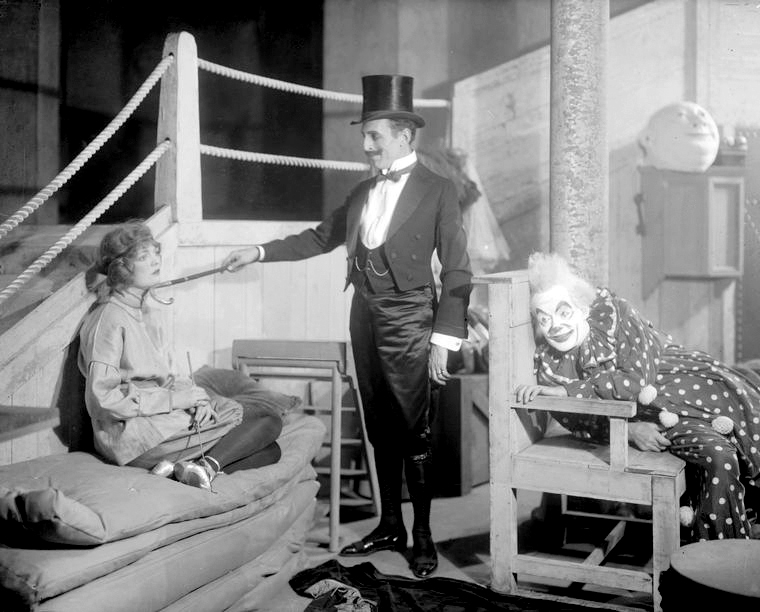
Margalo Gillmore, Frank Reicher and Richard Bennett in the Broadway production of He Who Gets Slapped (1922)

Date	Title	Role	Notes
May 10, 1891	The Limited Mail	Tombstone Jake	Standard Theatre, Chicago; First appearance on the professional stage, beginning in a small role but eventually playing the lead Production is on the road for a total of 54 weeks New York debut November 16, 1891 at Niblo's Garden
May 1897	A Round of Pleasure	Harry Spaulding	Knickerbocker Theatre, New York
October 4, 1897–	The Proper Caper	Achille	Hoyt's Theatre, New York; Produced by Gustave Frohman; Cast includes Henry Bergman, Amelia Bingham, Alice Fischer
November 22, 1897–	The White Heather	Dick Beach	Academy of Music, New York; Written by Cecil Raleigh and Henry Hamilton, produced by Charles Frohman
February 13–March 25, 1899	Her Atonement	Charles Le Roy	Academy of Music, New York; Produced by Charles Frohman
March 29, 1899–	At the White Horse Tavern	Frederick Siedler	Wallack's Theatre, New York; Produced by Charles Frohman; Bennett replaces Joseph Holland
May 9, 1899–	His Excellency the Governor	Captain Rivers	Lyceum Theatre, New York; Written by Robert Marshall, produced by Charles Frohman
March 26–April 1900	Twelve Months Later	Frederick Siedler	Hoyt's Theatre, New York; Sequel to At the White Horse Tavern
September 5, 1901–February 1902	A Royal Family	Father Anselm	Lyceum Theatre, New York; Written by Robert Marshall, produced by Charles Frohman
December 30, 1901–February 1902	Sweet and Twenty	Villain	Hoyt's Theatre, New York; Written by Basil Hood, produced by Charles Frohman
October 20–November 1902	His Excellency the Governor	Captain Rivers	Garrick Theatre, New York
November 17, 1902–January 1903	Imprudence	Jimmy Greaves	Empire Theatre, New York
October 19–December 1903	The Best of Friends	The Boer Boy	Academy of Music, New York; Written by Cecil Raleigh, produced by Charles Frohman; Cast includes Lionel Barrymore
December 29, 1903–May 1904	The Other Girl	Mr. Taylor	Criterion Theatre, Empire Theatre, Lyceum Theatre, New York; Cast includes Lionel Barrymore (Mr. Sheldon), Elsie de Wolfe (Estelle Kitteridge), Frank Worthing (Dr. Clifton Bradford)
September 5, 1905–	Man and Superman	Hector Malone, Jr.	Hudson Theatre, New York; Written by George Bernard Shaw, produced by Charles Dillingham; Cast includes Edward Abeles (Henry Straker), Clara Bloodgood (Violet Robinson), Fay Davis (Anne Whitefield), Alfred Hickman (Octavius Robinson), Robert Loraine (John Tanner)
November 20, 1905–	The Lion and the Mouse	Jefferson Ryder	Lyceum Theatre, Grand Opera House, Hudson Theatre, Academy of Music, New York; Written by Charles Klein, produced by Henry B. Harris; Cast includes Edmund Breese (John Burkett Ryder)
August 30, 1906–February 1907	The Hypocrites	Lennard Wilmore	Hudson Theatre, New York; Written by Henry Arthur Jones, produced by Charles Frohman; Cast includes Viva Birkett, W. H. Denny, Leslie Faber, Doris Keane, Jessie Millward
January 20–March 1908	Twenty Days in the Shade	Henri, Comte de Merville	Savoy Theatre, New York; Produced by Charles Frohman; Cast includes Pauline Frederick
September 5–September 1908	Diana of Dobson's	Victor Bretherton	Savoy Theatre, New York; Written by Cicely Hamilton, produced by Charles Frohman
December 23, 1908–June 1909	What Every Woman Knows	John Shand	Empire Theatre, New York; Written by J.M. Barrie, produced by Charles Frohman; Cast includes Maude Adams (Maggie Wylie), David Torrence (David Wylie), Lumsden Hare (Charles Venables)
August 11–September 1910	The Brass Bottle	Horace Ventimore	Lyceum Theatre, New York; Written by F. Anstey, produced by Charles Frohman
January 9–May 1911	The Deep Purple	William Lake	Lyric Theatre, New York
September 14–December 1911	Passers-by		Criterion Theatre, New York
December 25, 1912–May 1913	Stop Thief	Jack Doogan	Gaiety Theatre, New York
March 14–May 1913	Damaged Goods	Georges Dupont	Fulton Theatre, New York; Produced by Richard Bennett and Wilton Lackaye, Jr.
January 6–January 1915	Maternity		Princess Theatre, New York; Written by Eugene Brieux, adapted by Richard Bennett
April 4–May 1916	Rio Grande		Empire Theatre, New York; Written by Augustus Thomas
February 13–March 1917	The Morris Dance		Little Theatre, New York
April 9–May 1917	Bosum Friends		Liberty Theatre, New York
August 9–August 1917	The Very Idea	Alan Camp	Astor Theatre, New York; Written by William LeBaron
September 14, 1918–May 1919	The Unknown Purple		Lyric Theatre, New York; Written by Roland West and Carlyle Moore
April 8–May 1919	A Good Bad Woman		Harris Theatre, New York; Written by William Anthony McGuire, directed by Richard Bennett
December 19, 1919–May 1920	For the Defense	Christopher Armstrong	Playhouse Theatre, New York; Written by Elmer Rice
February 2–May 1920	Beyond the Horizon	Robert Mayo	Morosco Theatre, New York; Written by Eugene O'Neill, directed by Homer Saint-Gaudens
September 5–November 1921	The Hero	Andrew Lane	Belmont Theatre, New York
January 9–June 1922	He Who Gets Slapped	He	Garrick Theatre, New York
October 17, 1923–February 1924	The Dancers	Tony	Broadhurst Theatre, New York; Written by Gerald Du Maurier; Cast includes Barbara Bennett
November 24, 1924–October 1925	They Knew What They Wanted	Tony	Garrick Theatre, New York; Written by Sidney Howard
December 17, 1926–February 1927	Oh, Please	Sammy Sands	Fulton Theatre, New York; Written by Maurice Hennequin and Pierre Veber; Cast includes Helen Broderick, Beatrice Lillie, Charles Winninger
September 24, 1928–January 1929	Jarnegan	Jack Jarnegan	Longacre Theatre, New York; Directed by Richard Bennett; Cast includes Joan Bennett (stage debut)
October 14–November 1930	Solid South	Major Bruce Follonsby	Lyceum Theatre, New York; Directed by Rouben Mamoulian; Cast includes Bette Davis, Jessie Royce Landis
September 25, 1935–March 1936	Winterset	Judge Gaunt	Martin Beck Theatre, New York; Written by Maxwell Anderson, directed by Guthrie McClintic; Cast includes Burgess Meredith

== Selected filmography ==
Date	Title	Role	Notes
1914	Damaged Goods	George Dupont	Cast: Adrienne Morrison, John Steppling
1916	And the Law Says	Lawrence Kirby	Cast: George Periolat, Adrienne Morrison, William Carroll
1916	Philip Holden — Waster	Philip Holden	Cast: George Periolat, Adrienne Morrison, Rhea Mitchell, Clarence Burton, Orral Humphrey
1916	The Sable Blessing	George Slocum	Cast: Rhea Mitchell, Adrienne Morrison, George Newton, George Periolat
1916	The Valley of Decision	Young Manhood/Arnold Gray	Cast: Adrienne Morrison, George Periolat
1917	The Gilded Youth	John Slocum	Cast: Rhea Mitchell, Adrienne Morrison, George Periolat, Charles Newton
1919	Secret Marriage	—	Screenwriter
1919	The End of the Road	Doctor	Cast: Claire Adams, Alice Brady
1921	R.S.V.P.	—	Technical director
1921	The Barnstormer	—	Technical director
1924	The Eternal City	Bruno	Cast: Barbara La Marr, Bert Lytell
1924	Youth for Sale	Montgomery Breck	Cast: May Allison, Sigrid Holmquist, Charles Emmett Mack, Dorothy Allen
1925	Lying Wives	Ted Stanhope	Cast: Clara Kimball Young, Madge Kennedy, Edna Murphy, Niles Welch, J. Barney Sherry
1928	The Home Towners	Vic Arnold	Cast: Doris Kenyon, Robert McWade, Robert Edeson, Gladys Brockwell, John Miljan, Vera Lewis
1931	Five and Ten	John Rarick	Cast: Marion Davies, Leslie Howard
1931	Bought	David Meyer	Cast: Constance Bennett, Ben Lyon
1931	Arrowsmith	Gustav Sondelius	Cast: Ronald Colman, Helen Hayes
1932	This Reckless Age	Donald Ingals	Cast: Buddy Rogers, Peggy Shannon
1932	No Greater Love	Surgeon	Cast: Dickie Moore
1932	Madame Racketeer	Elmer Hicks	Cast: Alison Skipworth, George Raft
1932	Strange Justice	Kearney	Cast: Marian Marsh, Reginald Denny
1932	If I Had A Million	John Glidden	Cast: Gary Cooper, Charles Laughton, May Robson
1933	Big Executive	Commodore Richardson	Cast: Ricardo Cortez
1934	Nana	Gaston Greiner	Cast: Anna Sten, Lionel Atwill
1935	This Woman is Mine	Korn	Gregory Ratoff, John Loder, Benita Hume
1942	The Magnificent Ambersons	Major Amberson	Cast: Joseph Cotten, Dolores Costello, Anne Baxter, Tim Holt
1943	Journey into Fear	Ship's Captain	Cast: Joseph Cotten, Dolores del Río
