= Damaged Lives =

1933 film

- Directed by: Edgar G. Ulmer
- Written by: Edgar G. Ulmer (screenplay); Donald Davis (dialog)
- Based on: play Les Avariés by Eugène Brieux (uncredited)
- Produced by: J. J. Allen (producer); Maxwell Cohn (producer); Nat Cohn (producer)
- Starring: See below
- Cinematography: Allen G. Siegler
- Edited by: Otto Meyer
- Production company: Weldon Pictures Corporation
- Distributed by: Weldon Pictures (Columbia Pictures)
- Release dates: 22 May 1933 (Toronto, Ontario); 19 August 1933 (London, England); 15 September 1933 (Boston, Massachusetts)
- Running time: 61 minutes
- Countries: Canada; United States
- Language: English
- Budget: $18,000

Damaged Lives is a 1933 Canadian/American pre-Code exploitation film directed by Edgar G. Ulmer. The screenplay is based on the French play Les Avariés (1901) by Eugène Brieux.

The film was shot at General Service Studios, Hollywood, California for the Canadian Social Health Council and premiered in Toronto, Ontario.

Damaged Lives was initially released in Canada and a few cities in the United States but screenings were blocked by censors in most American towns. In 1937, the film was re-released as The Shocking Truth with a 29-minute supplementary lecture on VD added onto the end of the film to satisfy censors. Most current video releases do not include this extra material.

== Plot ==
The film hinges on a casual sexual encounter.

A boss insists that a young executive, with an important job and a long-term girlfriend, go out for the evening with an important client. They go to a swank party, where he meets the businessman's escort. Their personalities connect, and after the businessman leaves with another woman, they leave together and have a casual sexual encounter. The next day, the executive proposes to his girlfriend, they marry, and she becomes pregnant. The escort subsequently learns that she has syphilis from the businessman and summons the executive. She informs him of the situation, then kills herself.

Later, a medical exam on the wife reveals that her unborn child has syphilis, indicating that one or both of the parents are syphilitic. The executive reveals that he passed it on from the escort. Their friends, while supportive, now want to avoid physical contact with the pair. The distraught wife then tries to kill herself and her husband, thinking that they could never live a normal life.

The husband tries to console his wife...explaining how treatments are available and that they can be cured. When another friend calls the wife to say she also has syphilis and her worries are so trivial, the wife finally realizes she will be all right.

== Cast ==
- Diane Sinclair as Joan Bradley
- Lyman Williams as Donald Bradley Jr.
- Harry Myers as Nat Franklin
- Marceline Day as Laura Hall
- Jason Robards Sr. as Dr. Bill Hall
- Charlotte Merriam as Elise Cooper
- Murray Kinnell as Dr. Vincent Leonard
- George Irving as Donald Bradley Sr.
- Cecilia Parker as Rosie
- Almeda Fowler as Mrs. Bradley

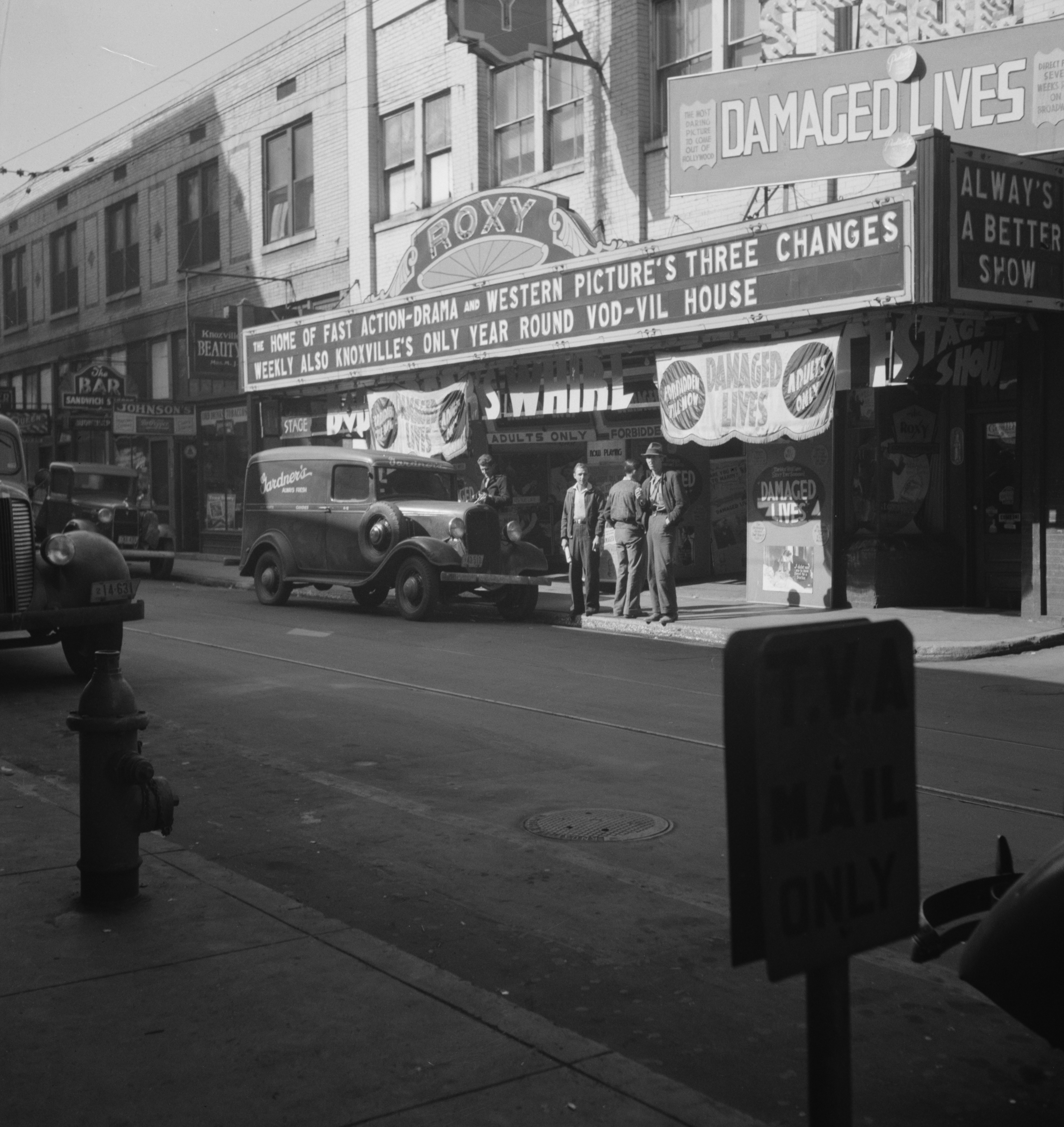
The Roxy Theater in Knoxville, Tennessee, showing the film in 1941 on a "adults only" basis.

== Production ==
Filmed in 1933, this cautionary tale was distributed under the name Weldon Pictures, because Columbia did not want to be associated with the topic of the film. The end title of the Internet Archive print says the film was an Educational Film Exchanges, Inc. release.

Although some scenes in the film were cut by state film censor boards in Maryland and Ohio, it was still very popular in the United States. For example, in Baltimore 65,000 people saw the film, representing approximately 10% of the population.

Damaged Lives was distributed in Britain through the British Social Hygiene Council (BSHC), which claimed a total viewership of around four million people between August 1933 and May 1934. The BSHC also claimed to have distributed more than 126,000 pamphlets to audience members with information on syphilis treatment.
