= Eugène Brieux =

French dramatist (1858–1932)

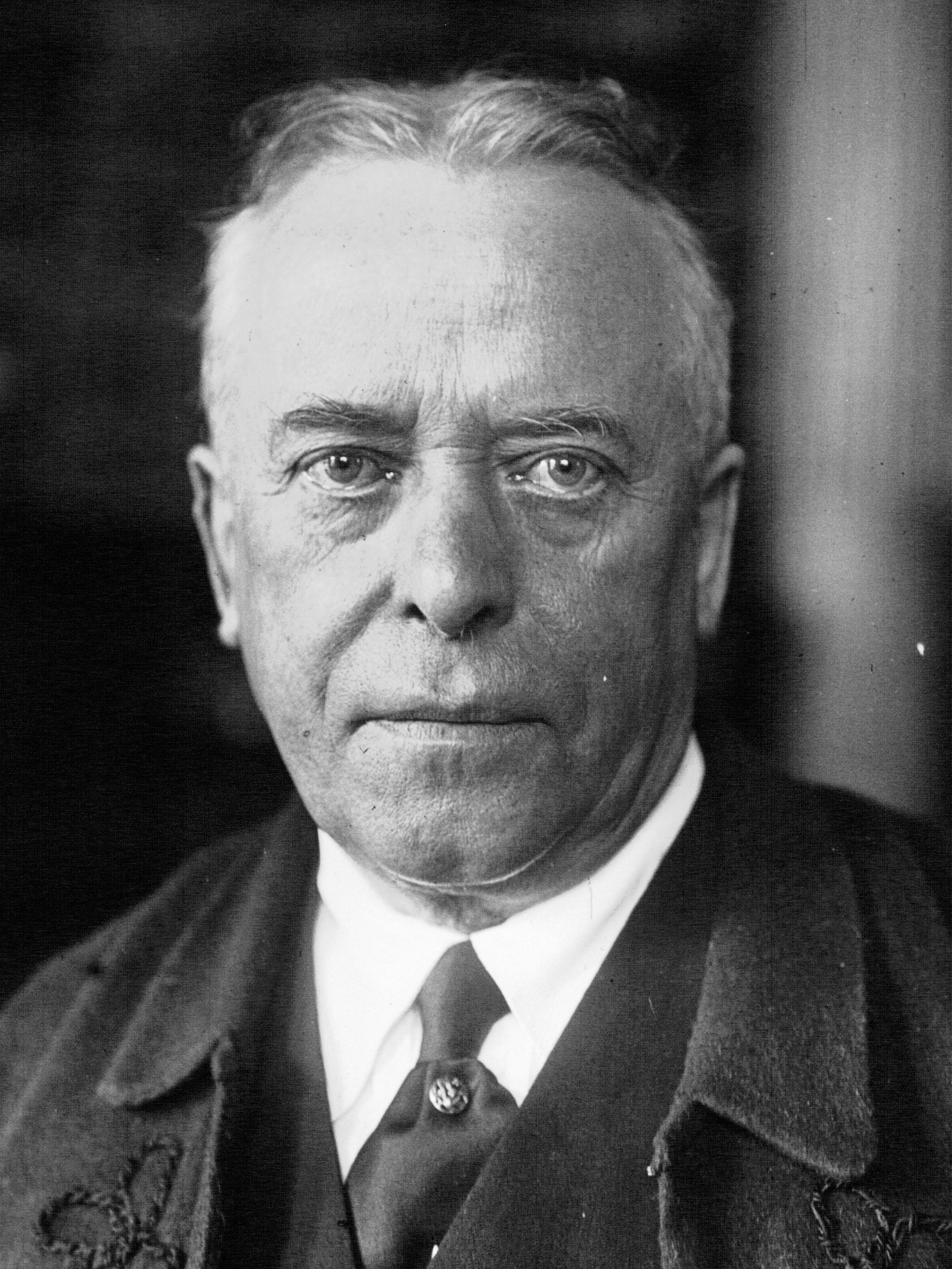
Eugène Brieux in 1923

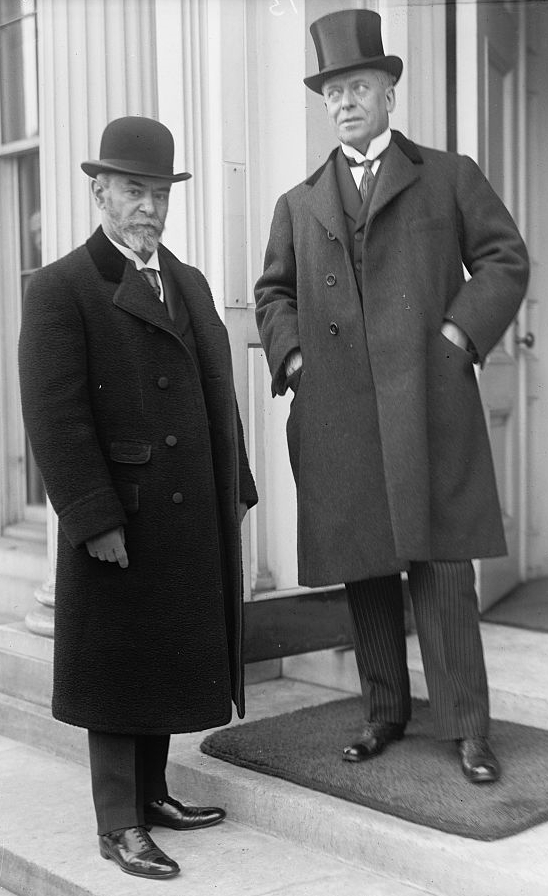
Jean Jules Jusserand (left) and Eugène Brieux (1914).

Eugène Brieux (French: [øʒɛn bʁijø]; 19 January 1858 – 6 December 1932) was a French dramatist.

== Biography ==
Brieux grew up as the son of a carpenter in modest circumstances in the Temple District of Paris (3rd Arrondissement). His schooling was limited to attending the "École communale" and "École primaire supérieure" ("École Turgot"), which he completed at the age of 13. Nonetheless, he was very interested in literature, read a lot and wrote his first play at the age of 15. For many years, in which he unsuccessfully offered his manuscripts to various theaters, he earned his living as a bank clerk. For the first time one of his plays, Bernard Palissy, was performed in 1879, at the theater in Cluny, but only once.

On the basis of this limited success, Brieux first decided to try his hand at journalism. After a few years as a reporter in Dieppe, he became editor-in-chief of Le Nouvelliste in Rouen. In Rouen he also staged some less important plays without losing sight of a career in Paris. He found encouragement when his play Ménage des Artistes was performed at the Théâtre Libre in 1890. But it was only two years later that he finally made his breakthrough with the play Blanchette, which was performed over a hundred times by the theater manager and actor André Antoine and also toured the provinces.

On that basis Brieux returned to Paris, where he wrote articles for Patrie, Gaulois and Le Figaro. Between 1893 and 1899 he also worked as a theater and music critic for La Vie Contemporaine. Above all, however, he now wrote play after play. At first his works emphasized the comic, but his so-called 'Sturm und Drang [‘Storm and Stress’] period' began with the play Les Trois Filles de M. Dupont in 1897. In plays such as Le Berceau (1898), La Robe Rouge (1900), Les Avariés (1901) and Maternité (1903), he critically examined social problems such as poverty, political corruption, divorce, venereal diseases, the death penalty and parenthood. Later dramas like Les Hannetons (1906) or Simone (1908), on the other hand, were again more optimistic.

By the outbreak of World War I, Brieux had written over forty plays and reached the peak of his fame. His drama Les Avariés (1903), translated in German as Die Schiffbrüchigen [the “shipwrecked”] [and English as Damaged Goods], which dealt with syphilis and its consequences and which was censored in various countries because of its medical details, was considered the most discussed play of the decade and the greatest contribution of theater to the good of mankind. In particular, sex reform groups propagated the educational play, in Germany, for example, by the German Society for Combating Venereal Diseases. It was seen by an audience of millions between 1910 and 1920 in Germany alone. In the United States, Upton Sinclair wrote a novelized version of the play in 1913. In 1918, Jacob and Luise Fleck filmed the play under the title Die Geissel der Menschheit [The Scourge of Humanity]; Edgar G. Ulmer adapted it in 1933 under the title Damaged Lives."

Brieux increasingly withdrew to the countryside. His villa in Agay, near Cannes, became a local tourist attraction, prompting him to move to an even more remote region in the Loire department, where he spent his time fishing and farming. He was made a Knight of the Legion of Honor and in 1908 campaigned for the Académie française, to succeed Ludovic Halévy. In 1909 his wish came true when he was admitted. He prevailed over Alfred Capus and Georges de Porto-Riche.

Brieux was the best known and most popular French playwright of his time. George Bernard Shaw called him "incomparably the greatest writer France has produced since Molière" and maintained that after the death of Henrik Ibsen there was no more important playwright west of Russia. For others he was "the Tolstoy of the Faubourg du Temple". After the First World War, however, interest in his plays, whose didactic impetus was no longer considered up-to-date, waned sharply.

== Works ==
A one-act play, Bernard Palissy, written in collaboration with M. Gaston Salandri, was produced in 1879, but he had to wait eleven years before he obtained another hearing, his Ménage d'artistes being produced by André Antoine at the Théâtre Libre in 1890.

His plays are essentially didactic, being aimed at some weakness or iniquity of the social system. Blanchette (1892) pointed out the civic results of the education of girls of the working classes; Monsieur de Réboval (1892) was directed against pharisaism; L'Engrenage (1894) against corruption in politics; Les Bienfaiteurs (1896) against the frivolity of fashionable charity; and L'Évasion (1896) satirized an indiscriminate belief in the doctrine of heredity.

Les trois filles de M. Dupont (1897) is a powerful, somewhat brutal, study of the miseries imposed on poor middle-class girls by the French system of dowry; Le Résultat des courses (1898) shows the evil results of betting among the Parisian workmen; La Robe rouge (1900) was directed against the injustices of the law; Les Remplaçantes (1901) against the practice of putting children out to nurse.

Les Avariés (1901), Damaged Lives in English, was banned by the censor, due to its medical details of syphilis, was read privately by the author at the Théâtre Antoine. It tells how a young lawyer infected with syphilis declines his physician's advice to take a long course of mercurial treatment and postpone his marriage. It was dedicated to Jean Alfred Fournier, Europe's foremost expert on syphilis.

Petite amie (1902) describes the life of a Parisian shop-girl. Later plays are La Couvée (1903, acted privately at Rouen in 1893), Maternité (1904), La Déserteuse (1904), in collaboration with M. Jean Sigaux, and Les Hannetons, a comedy in three acts (1906).

Brieux wrote four more plays in the ensuing decade. The first was La Foi, for which Camille Saint-Saëns wrote incidental music in 1909. It was presented in Monte Carlo on 10 April, and at Her Majesty's Theatre, London, on 20 September. This was followed by La Femme Seule (1913), Le Bourgeois aux champs (1914), and Les Américains chez nous (1920). He also wrote some travelogues: Voyages aux Indes et à Indo-Chine (1910) and Au Japon par Java, la Chine, la Corée (1914). He also wrote wartime pamphlets, paying special attention to the care of those blinded by their wounds.

Eugène Brieux died in 1932 and was interred in the Cimetière du Grand Jas in Cannes on the French Riviera.

== Filmography ==
- Damaged Goods, directed by Tom Ricketts (1914, based on the play Les Avariés)
- Die Geißel der Menschheit, directed by Luise Kolm and Jacob Fleck (1918, based on the play Les Avariés)
- Simone, directed by Camille de Morlhon (1918, based on the play Simone)
- A Métely, directed by Mihály Fekete (1918, based on the play Les Avariés)
- Damaged Goods, directed by Alexander Butler (1919, based on the play Les Avariés)
- Blanchette, directed by René Hervil (1921, based on the play Blanchette)
- The Cradle, directed by Paul Powell (1922, based on the play Le Berceau)
- L'Avocat, directed by Gaston Ravel (1925, based on the play L'Avocat)
- Simone, directed by Émile-Bernard Donatien (1926, based on the play Simone)
- Damaged Lives, directed by Edgar G. Ulmer (1933, based on the play Les Avariés)
- The Red Robe, directed by Jean de Marguenat (1933, based on the play La Robe rouge)
- Blanchette, directed by Pierre Caron (1937, based on the play Blanchette)
- Damaged Goods, directed by Phil Goldstone (1937, based on the play Les Avariés)
- Coup de feu dans la nuit, directed by Robert Péguy (1943, based on the play L'Avocat)
