= Florence Roberts (actress, born 1871) =

American actress

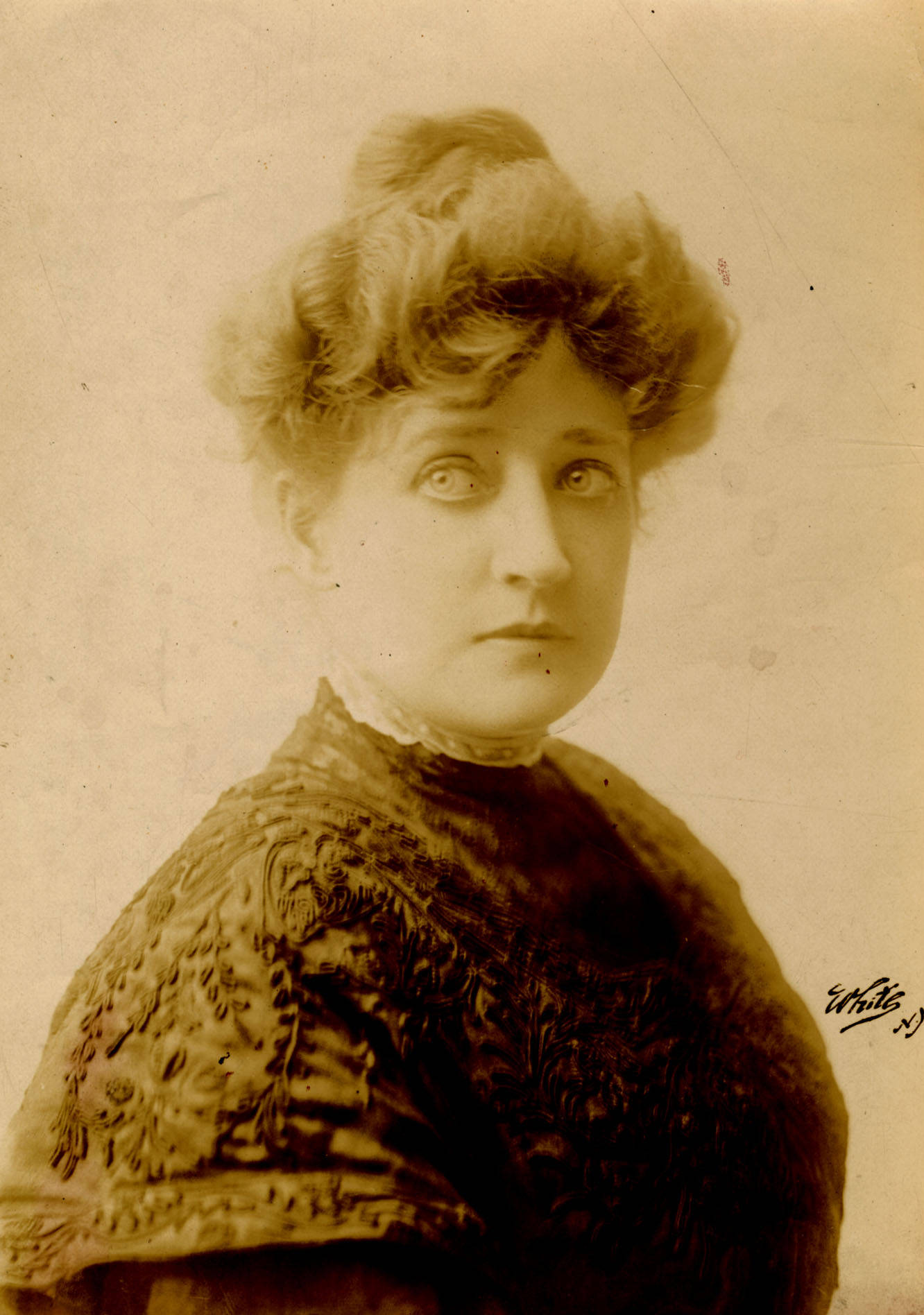
- Roberts in 1908
- Born: February 14, 1871; New York City, U.S.
- Died: July 17, 1927 (aged 56); Los Angeles, California, U.S.
- Occupation: Actress
- Years active: 1889–1925
- Spouses: Lewis Morrison (m. 1892; died 1906) Frederick Vogeding (m. 1920)
- Relatives: Theodore Roberts (cousin)

Florence Roberts (February 14, 1871 – July 17, 1927) was an American stage actress and the second wife of actor Lewis Morrison.

== Biography ==
Roberts was born in New York but raised in California and had early success in the San Francisco area beginning in 1889. She performed at the Baldwin Theatre and the Alcazar Theatre often playing Shakespearean parts. In 1905 she toured a play called Ana La Mont under the management of John Cort.

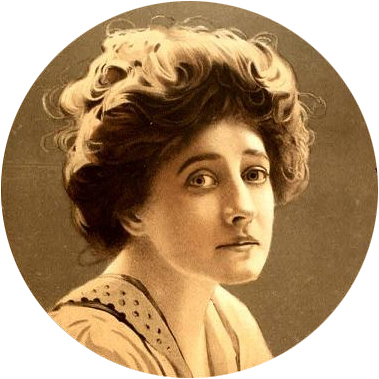
Florence Roberts c.1906

She toured plays in the Western United States but seldom to New York. After World War I she toured South Africa in the stage adaptation of Mrs. Wiggs of the Cabbage Patch. After returning to the United States she appeared in a few silent films then retired. She died in Los Angeles in 1927, aged 56, after emergency surgery.

== Personal life ==
She was the second wife of actor Lewis Morrison, the father of actress Adrienne Morrison and grandfather of Joan Bennett, Constance Bennett and Barbara Bennett, thus making Roberts step-mother to Adrienne Morrison. Roberts was a cousin to character actor Theodore Roberts with whom she had appeared on the stage. Roberts' greatest stage success was in The Strength of the Weak, performed on Broadway in 1906. That same year Lewis Morrison died and she later remarried, to an actor named Frederick Vogeding.

== Later years ==
In 1912 she was one of the first famous stage stars to appear in a film version of a famous play, in this case an independent production of Sapho which had made actress Olga Nethersole famous in the early 1900s. Roberts appeared in four more silent pictures up to 1925 before dying in 1927.

== Other noted actress with the same name ==
Another stage and screen actress of the same name began her screen career in 1930 with Mack Sennett.
