= Rosabel (name) =

Rosabel is a feminine given name. Notable people with the name include:

- Rosabel Espinosa (born 1976), Spanish rhythmic gymnast
- Rosabel Morrison (1869–1911), American actress
- Rosabel Tan, New Zealand writer and strategist
- Rosabel Watson (1865–1959), English conductor and musician
