= Rose Wood =

American actress (1845–1932)

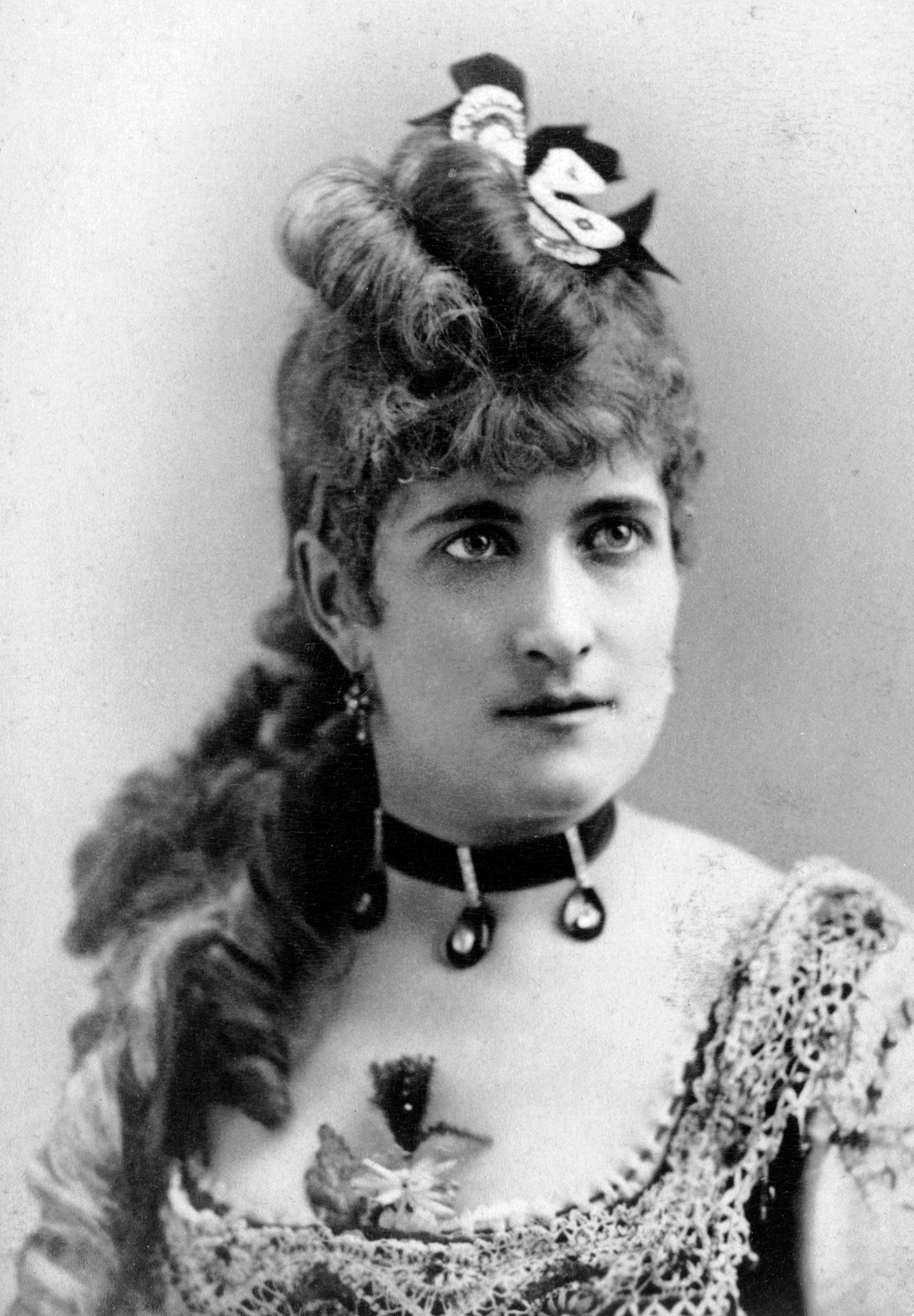
- Born: Rosabel Wood; June 21, 1845; New York, U.S.
- Died: March 7, 1932 (aged 86); Tenafly, New Jersey, U.S.
- Spouse: Lewis Morrison (m. 1877; div. 1890)
- Children: 3, including Rosabel and Adrienne

Rosabel Wood Morrison (June 21, 1845 – March 7, 1932) was an American actress and dancer who performed under the name Rose Wood. She was the grandmother of the Bennett sisters Constance, Barbara, and Joan, all stars of early Hollywood.

Rosabel Wood was born on June 21, 1845 in New York, the daughter of actor and pantomimist William F. Wood and actress Sarah Campbell. She made her stage debut at age three as La Petite Rosabel, dancing in The Dumb Man of Manchester at the Chestnut Street Theatre in Philadelphia, going on to regularly appear as a dancer in Philadelphia theaters for over a decade. Her New York debut was at the Winter Garden Theatre, dancing in The Naiad Queen. In 1864, she turned to acting, appearing as Madelain in Satan in Paris at the Varieties Theatre in New Orleans.

In 1865 she married Lewis Morrison, a fellow actor in her troupe. They had three children, Rosabel, Adrienne, and Victor. Their two daughters went on to become actresses and Adrienne was the mother of the Bennett sisters. In 1886, Rose Wood successfully sued for divorce on the grounds of adultery.

Rose Wood appeared in at least one film, starring as Pearl in Sylvia on a Spree (1918).

Rose Wood died on 7 March 1932 at Tenafly, New Jersey.

== Filmography ==
- Sylvia on a Spree (1918)
