= James B. Pinker =

Literary agent (1863–1922)

James Brand Pinker (1863 – February 8, 1922) was a literary agent who represented James Joyce, Joseph Conrad, Ford Madox Ford, Henry James, Stephen Crane, H.G. Wells, D.H. Lawrence, and many of the other leading British and American writers of the age. He is considered one of the first literary agents in the modern sense and to have placed relations between authors and publishers on a more professional and fairer basis.

Pinker established an office in Arundel Street in central London in 1896. Joseph Conrad engaged Pinker as his agent in August 1899. His novella Typhoon, which was published in The Pall Mall Magazine was the first piece of writing by Conrad to be handled by Pinker. Conrad's engagement of an agent to represent him was seen as violating a gentlemanly code of conduct by William Blackwood, publisher of Blackwood's Edinburgh Magazine, the periodical in which several of Conrad's important early works, including Heart of Darkness, had been published.

Following J. B. Pinker's death, his sons Eric Seabrooke Pinker (1891–1973) and James Randolph "Ralph" Pinker (1900–1959) took over the literary agency, which they ran with considerably less success than their father; the business failed in 1944. Both Eric and Ralph eventually faced imprisonment for differing charges related to diverting authors' royalties into their own pockets: Eric in New York and Ralph in London. Eric married twice: first to Margit Vibege Watney née Dietrichson, a Norwegian widow. Upon her death in 1927, he married the actress Adrienne Morrison, mother of the Bennett sisters (Barbara, Constance, and Joan). Morrison too predeceased him; she died in 1940. He did not remarry. The second wife of Eric's stepson John Basil Watney (biographer of the Churchills) was theatre scene designer Antoinette Rose Pratt Barlow (1917–1981).
