= Children of the Ghetto (1899 play) =

1899 play by Israel Zangwill

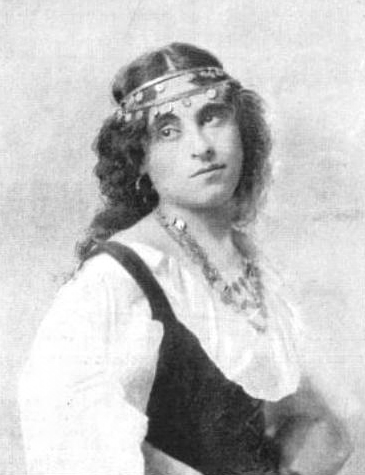
- Rosabel Morrison in the original production of Children of the Ghetto
- Original language: English
- Written by: Israel Zangwill
- Based on: Children of the Ghetto: History of a Peculiar People by Israel Zangwill (1892)
- Music by: William Furst
- Subject: Love and religious law
- Genre: Drama
- Setting: Jewish quarter of London, c. 1874

Premiere
- Date: October 16, 1899
- Place: Herald Square Theatre
- Directed by: James A. Herne

Children of the Ghetto is an 1899 play written by British author Israel Zangwill. It is loosely based on Zangwill's 1892 novel of the same name. (Note: The titles of both the novel and the play are sometimes erroneously given an initial "The".) It is a drama in four acts, each with a subtitle and its own setting. The play is set around 1874, within the Jewish Quarter of London. The main plot centers on the love-affair of a young couple, thwarted from marrying by an obscure religious law and an unfortunate joke. The action of the play spans a hundred days time starting at Hanukkah.

It was first produced by Liebler & Company on Broadway, staged by James Herne, and starred Wilton Lackaye, Blanche Bates, and Frank Worthing.

Though successful in tryouts, the play and its author drew negative reactions from New York reviewers and the local Jewish community during its Broadway run. It closed after two months, and the production then moved to London during December 1899 but lasted only a week. The following US national tour had mixed success, garnering some praise but eventually losing money. The play was never revived on Broadway, though a Yiddish adaptation was produced in the Bowery during December 1904. It was also adapted for the screenplay of a 1915 motion picture of the same name.

While it did not return its backers investment, scholar Edna Nahshon wrote that Children of the Ghetto "should not be judged by the conventional standards of theatrical success or failure". Its legacy was as the "first Jewish play presented on the Anglo-American English language stage".

== Characters ==
Only the principal speaking parts are given. Characters are listed in order of appearance within their scope.

Lead

- Melchitsedek Pinchas is an importuning Galician poet and self-proclaimed paragon of learning.
- Hannah Jacobs is Reb Schmeul's pretty daughter, who loves and honors her father.
- Reb Schmeul Jacobs is an Orthodox rabbi, strict in belief, but generous and kind-hearted.
- David Borden is a young man of the quarter who has returned from years in Cape Town.

Supporting

- Michael Birnbaum is 30, president of a Reformed Synagogue, married to the much older Malka.
- Ephraim Phillips is a businessman of Polish heritage, married to Malka's daughter Milly.
- Sam Levine is a successful and hearty commercial traveler, engaged to Malka's daughter Leah.
- Milly Phillips is Malka's daughter by her first husband, and Ephraim's wife.
- Leah is Malka's other daughter by her first husband, engaged to Sam Levine.
- Malka is a widowed businesswoman, now remarried and head of her extended family.
- Esther Ansell is 12, daughter of Moses, outspoken and brave, mother to her younger siblings.
- Moses Ansell is an unworldly impoverished widower, a Yiddish-speaking peddler of great learning.

Featured

- Guedalyah the Greengrocer is a Zionist neighbor to Milly and Ephraim.
- Simon Wolf is a labor-leader, for whom everything is political in nature.
- Sugarman the Shadchan is the quarter's matchmaker who usually works on commission.
- Shosshi Schmendrik is a shy carpenter, socially awkward, who unwisely has paid Sugarman in advance.
- Mrs. Belcovitch is a dried-up older lady with many maladies but energetic in dancing and disputes.
- Becky is Mrs. Belcovitch's buxom daughter, who refuses to honor the marriage contract with Shosshi.
- Mrs. Jacobs is Hannah's mother, who despairs of Reb Schmeul's generosity and Hannah's single state.
- Widow Finkelstein redeems Shosshi's belief that he too can find love.

== Synopsis ==
The play was never published during the author's lifetime, its first print appearance being in Edna Nahshon's From the Ghetto to the Melting Pot: Israel Zangwill's Jewish Plays (2006), which is the source for this synopsis.

Act I: The Letter of the Law (At Milly's house at the feast of Hanukkah.) Michael, Ephraim, and Milly greet Sam, who has returned from a business trip bringing a ring for his fiancé, Leah. The four are interrupted by Pinchas, who flogs his books and cadges a meal in the kitchen. Malka and Esther return from the market, followed shortly by Leah. Hannah arrives to collect donations for a charity. Sam shows everyone the ring, then jokingly puts it on Hannah's finger and recites the marriage vow. Pinchas warns them this was a valid marriage. He rushes off to bring Reb Schmeul while Esther fetches her father. Reb Schmeul says a Get must be prepared and Sam must give it to Hannah to effect a divorce. Moses Ansell prepares the document while Reb Schmeul instructs Sam in how to deliver it. The divorce is validated as the act ends. (Curtain)

Act II: The Spirit of Love (A ball at the People's Club, at Purim, 72 days later.) At the Purim ball Malka decries the secularisation of the modern holiday, as Leah and Milly waltz with men other than their husbands. Soon Michael comes to lead her into the dancing, while Sam Levine greets his old school friend David Borden, just back from Cape Town with a modest fortune from years of prospecting. Simon Wolf leaves the celebration to visit the labor hall. A little side story plays out involving Sugarman, Shosshi, Mrs. Belcovitch, and Becky. David rescues Hannah from a tipsy Pinchas; he has heard something of her from Sam, and she soon teases him with the story of her quick marriage and divorce. They like one another, but when David asks if her hypothetical future lover might feign piety, she replies that Truth must be the bedrock of any liaison. (Curtain)

Act III: The Letter and the Spirit (Reb Schmeul's study, on the Great Sabbath, 25 days later.) (Note: During this act occasional sounds of rocks being thrown against the house and mutterings of "Jew, Jew" are heard from outside the door. Also, three times during the act an old Irish woman enters the house after tapping at the door. She ignores and is ignored by others present. This is the Sabbath Fire Woman; at each visit she extinguishes a few more candles, until at the end of the act the stage is left in darkness.) Reb Schmeul, Mrs. Jacobs, and Hannah have finished their Sabbath meal. Mrs. Belcovitch and Shosshi come to discuss a money quarrel, but are turned away as it is the Sabbath. Pinchas and Guedalyah ask Reb Schmeul to head up a fund for Jewish resettlement in Palestine. Hannah takes Mrs. Jacobs upstairs at Pinchas' entry. Guedalyah is told by Reb Schmuel he will consider it. Pinchas lingers to press his suit for Hannah, which her father sidesteps. Once Pinchas is gone, Hannah comes downstairs to tell her father of her betrothment with David. Reb Schmeul gives his permission then goes up to bed. Esther drops by next, to solicit Hannah's goodwill for her little brother. As she leaves, David surprises Hannah in the open doorway. She tells him the good news. Reb Schmeul, hearing the commotion comes down, and the three decide to celebrate. But a chance remark by David, that he is a descendent of Aaron and hence a Kohen, ruins the mood. Reb Schmeul cites the law: a Kohen may not marry a divorced woman. Sam's joke has destroyed Hannah and David's chance for happiness. David rages against this obscure law but is rebuked by Reb Schmeul. Hannah proclaims her love for David, but will not go with him in defiance of her religion. (Curtain)

Act IV: Love and Law (At the ghetto marketplace in front of Reb Schmeul's house, three days later.) The waning hours of the street market are shown before sundown on Friday. Many of the minor characters have their little moments getting ready for the Sabbath. Reb Schmeul gives all his money and even his coat to beggars. A noisy labor march comes through the street, led by Simon Wolf and Pinchas, embittered by Hannah's rejection. They mock the faithful getting ready for services and in turn are mocked by the pious. Reb Schmeul leaves the Synagogue to remonstrate with them, and they move off. David catches Hannah outside her house. He begs her to elope with him to America. She first agrees then relents, then agrees again, but when her father returns from services, she cannot bear to leave him. As the curtains are closed at the Jacobs' house, David hurls a rock in frustration. Hearing it strike, Mrs. Jacobs says it was a Christian rough. Reb Schmeul, thinking of the labor marchers, replies, "It is worse-- it is some Jewish rough". Hannah, sent to close the shutters, is confronted once more by David, but sends him away, while her father recites a prayer. (Slow Curtain)

== Differences from novel ==
The multi-threaded storyline of the novel was consolidated down to the romance of Hannah Jacobs and David Brandon. The character of Esther Anstell occupied a major place in the novel, but was reduced for the play. The role of Melchitsedek Pinchas was expanded in the drama by assigning him the actions of several minor characters from the novel, principally Old Hyams. The character of Levi Jacobs, Hannah's brother in the novel, was eliminated for the play, and that of Mrs. Jacobs reduced, to strengthen the relationship between Hannah and her father.

== Original production ==
=== Background ===
Liebler & Company had a successful production with The Christian, an 1898 drama adapted from a novel by its author, Hall Caine. Looking for another novel to dramatise, partners T. A. Liebler and George C. Tyler came across Children of the Ghetto (1892). Tyler said they had been warned about Zangwill, that he was a polarising figure in the Jewish world (Note: Neither partner was of Jewish heritage. Tyler's informant was likely Abe Erlanger, with whom he had a close working relationship for many years.) and that he had antagonised American drama critics with an 1898 lecture tour. But Liebler & Company were sparing no expense, paying director James A. Herne $500 a week, and casting ten popular stars of the day to woo audiences. There would eventually be forty-one speaking parts, and up to 150 people on stage during the fourth act marketplace scene.

The author was very much involved with casting and the play's production. The overall scenic design was by the author's brother, artist Mark Zangwill, while the settings were built by Frank E. Gates and E. A. Morange. William Furst composed a prelude, and incidental music for Act IV, drawing on traditional Hebrew songs. In order to establish the English copyright, the first performance of the play was done in near secrecy at Deal, England, on July 25, 1899.

Zangwill arrived in America by August 20, 1899, to begin working with director James A. Herne on staging Children of the Ghetto. Rehearsals began that week; a cast list from then shows actor Wilson Deal started in the role of Michael Birnbaum. By September 12, 1899, his name was replaced in advertising by Emil Hoch. Advertising in the weeks before the first tryout featured the play's title in extra large font, but by the day of the first tryout had been superseded by ads with "The Zangwill Play" in large font followed by the title within paranthese and in much smaller font. The ostensible reason for the switch was the September debut of a play called The Ghetto by Herman Heijermans, but which a critic in New York would ascribe to the author's vanity.

=== Cast ===
Principal cast for the tryouts and during the original Broadway and London runs.
Role	Actor	Dates	Notes and sources
Melchisedak Pinchas	William Norris	Sep 18, 1899 - Dec 16, 1899	Zangwill wanted David Warfield for this role, which Nahson says was "central to his vision of the play".
Hannah Jacobs	Blanche Bates	Sep 18, 1899 - Nov 25, 1899	
Hannah Jacobs	Rosabel Morrison	Dec 11, 1899 - Dec 16, 1899	For the London run only, Morrison who usually played "Leah", took the female lead.
Reb Shmeul	Wilton Lackaye	Sep 18, 1899 - Dec 16, 1899	
David Borden	Frank Worthing	Sep 18, 1899 - Nov 25, 1899	
David Borden	Robert Edeson	Dec 11, 1899 - Dec 16, 1899	Edeson played the role only for the London run.
Michael Birnbaum	Emil Hoch	Sep 18, 1899 - Dec 16, 1899	
Ephraim Phillips	Frank Cornell	Sep 18, 1899 - Dec 16, 1899	
Sam Levine	Fred Lotto	Sep 18, 1899 - Dec 16, 1899	
Milly Phillips	Laura Almosnino	Sep 18, 1899 - Dec 16, 1899	
Leah	Rosabel Morrison	Sep 18, 1899 - Nov 25, 1899	
Leah	Ellen Burg	Dec 11, 1899 - Dec 16, 1899	Burg played the role for the London run only.
Malka	Ada Dwyer	Sep 18, 1899 - Dec 16, 1899	
Esther Ansell	Mabel Taliaferro	Sep 18, 1899 - Dec 16, 1899	Taliaferro was, like her character, 12 years old during the production.
Moses Ansell	Adolph Lestina	Sep 18, 1899 - Dec 16, 1899	
Guedalyah	Gus Frankel	Sep 18, 1899 - Dec 16, 1899	
Simon Wolf	Claude Brooke	Sep 18, 1899 - Dec 16, 1899	
Sugarman	Charles Stanley	Sep 18, 1899 - Dec 16, 1899	
Shosshi Schmendrick	Richard Carle	Sep 18, 1899 - Dec 16, 1899	
Mrs. Belcovitch	Madame Cottrelly	Sep 18, 1899 - Dec 16, 1899	
Becky	Ada Curry	Sep 18, 1899 - Dec 16, 1899	
Mrs. Jacobs	Louise Muldener	Sep 18, 1899 - Dec 16, 1899	
Widow Finkelstein	Sadie Stringham	Sep 18, 1899 - Dec 16, 1899	

=== Tryouts ===
Children of the Ghetto had its first tryout on September 18, 1899, at the National Theater in Washington, D.C. The reviewer for The Evening Times called it the "most important production of the Washington season", but said a "success Children of the Ghetto may be, but never in its present form". They felt the superfluous situations and characters of the first two acts, and the lack of dramatic substance until the third act, weakened the play despite the overall excellence of the performances.

The production then moved to Ford's Opera House in Baltimore starting September 25, 1899. The Baltimore Sun review said Children of the Ghetto was a rare dramatization that achieved both popular and artistic success.

The play had its final tryout in Philadelphia, at the Walnut Street Theatre starting on October 2, 1899. Zangwill, when visiting the city for the tryout, denied a rumor that changes had been made in the play since Washington, D.C. The reviewer for The Philadelphia Inquirer noted "it was less dramatic than it is pictorial" but felt the weak drama was compensated for by depictions of Jewish life and customs. They also praised the acting of Wilton Lackaye, Frank Worthing, Blanche Bates, Richard Carle, and Mabel Taliaferro, but thought William Norris' Pinchas exaggerated. The Philadelphia Times reviewer concurred in the latter judgement, but also felt Carle's interpretation of Schmendrick too clownish. Both Philadelphia critics said the play was very well received by the audience, with Zangwill making a few remarks at the final curtain.

=== Premiere and reception ===
The play premiered on Broadway at the Herald Square Theatre on October 16, 1899. For New York only, Zangwill had a printed prologue distributed to the audience, something that no reviewer mentioned as happening at the tryouts. This work of forty rhymed lines was a preview of the play's theme and storyline.

New York drama critics remembered Zangwill's 1898 lecture tour disparaging their craft, and let him know it in their opening night columns. The Brooklyn Daily Times reviewer admired Zangwill's dialogue and "large number of contrasting characters", but felt the latter had preoccupied the author to the detriment of dramatic structure, "this sample of his abilities as a dramatist hardly justifies the position he has assumed as criterion of the play-making art." The review complimented the acting and noted the audience's favorable reaction to the play, then concluded by saying "Mr. Zangwill obtruded his picturesque personality" on stage after the final curtain. The New York Times review said the play "was found to justify the expectations of its worth", but noted the audience applause at the final climax "was clearly of a purely perfunctory sort".

The review for the Brooklyn Daily Eagle featured a bit of animus that focused on the author as much as the play. “The play has several titles… It is modestly termed, in the very largest type, The Zangwill Play. The 'The' refers to Zangwill, and not to the play. It is then sub-termed Children of the Ghetto. And it is declared to be 'An Original Drama, by Mr. Israel Zangwill, Founded on his World Famous Novel of the same Title'. The regret that no credit whatsoever is given to Mr. Zangwill in all this elusive announcement will be extreme. We regret to say, it is not a play at all. It is a panorama set in four scenes. And if it were a pantomime as well as a panorama, the appearance of many people in it would be improved…"

The Standard Union by contrast gave good notices to the production without reference to the author's personality, its only caveat being the lengthy fourth act discussions of religion in a play that had already lasted over two hours. The Sun also carried a positive review, calling Children of the Ghetto "a play of words and not of deeds".

Severe criticism came two days after the premiere from an editorial in The New York Times. It accused Zangwill of not keeping faith with his fellow practitioners of Judaism in Children of the Ghetto: "Its author presents the most sacred of Jewish rites, not in their highest, but in their lowest phases, not as a plea for respect, but as an excuse for laughter. This is disloyalty."

=== Broadway closing ===
Children of the Ghetto closed on November 25, 1899, at the Herald Square Theatre. Liebler & Company then took the production company to London, where the play opened on December 11, 1899, at the Adelphi Theatre. It lasted only a week, which producer George C. Tyler ascribed to British gloom over the Second Boer War. English reviewers, though recognizing the play's originality and merit, cited the incongruous accents of the all-American cast in portraying London Jews, the weak drama springing from a joke, and the use of anti-climax as weaknesses.

== Adaptations ==
=== Stage ===
Children of the Ghetto was translated into Yiddish by Leon Kobrin and presented at the People's Theatre in the Bowery starting December 23, 1904. It starred Sigmund Feinman as Reb Schmeul, with Boris Thomashefsky as David Brandon, and Bessie Thomashefsky as Hannah Jacobs.

=== Film ===
During November 1914, it was reported that a film of Children of the Ghetto was being made by the Box Office Attraction Company in arrangement with Liebler & Company (Note: This was one month before Liebler & Company went bankrupt and was placed into receivership.) at a cost of $75,000. Wilton Lackaye reprised his role as Reb Schmeul Jacobs for this five-reel (Note: Some advertisements stated it was in six parts.) 1915 release. The film was started in late December 1914, at the Pathe Studio in New York. It was produced by Frank Powell and distributed by William Fox.

== Bibliography ==
- Edna Nahshon, From the Ghetto to the Melting Pot: Israel Zangwill's Jewish Plays (Wayne State University Press), 2006. ISBN 978-0-8143-2955-9
- George C. Tyler and J. C. Furnas. Whatever Goes Up. Bobbs Merrill, 1934.
