= Rosabel Morrison =

American stage actor (1869–1911)

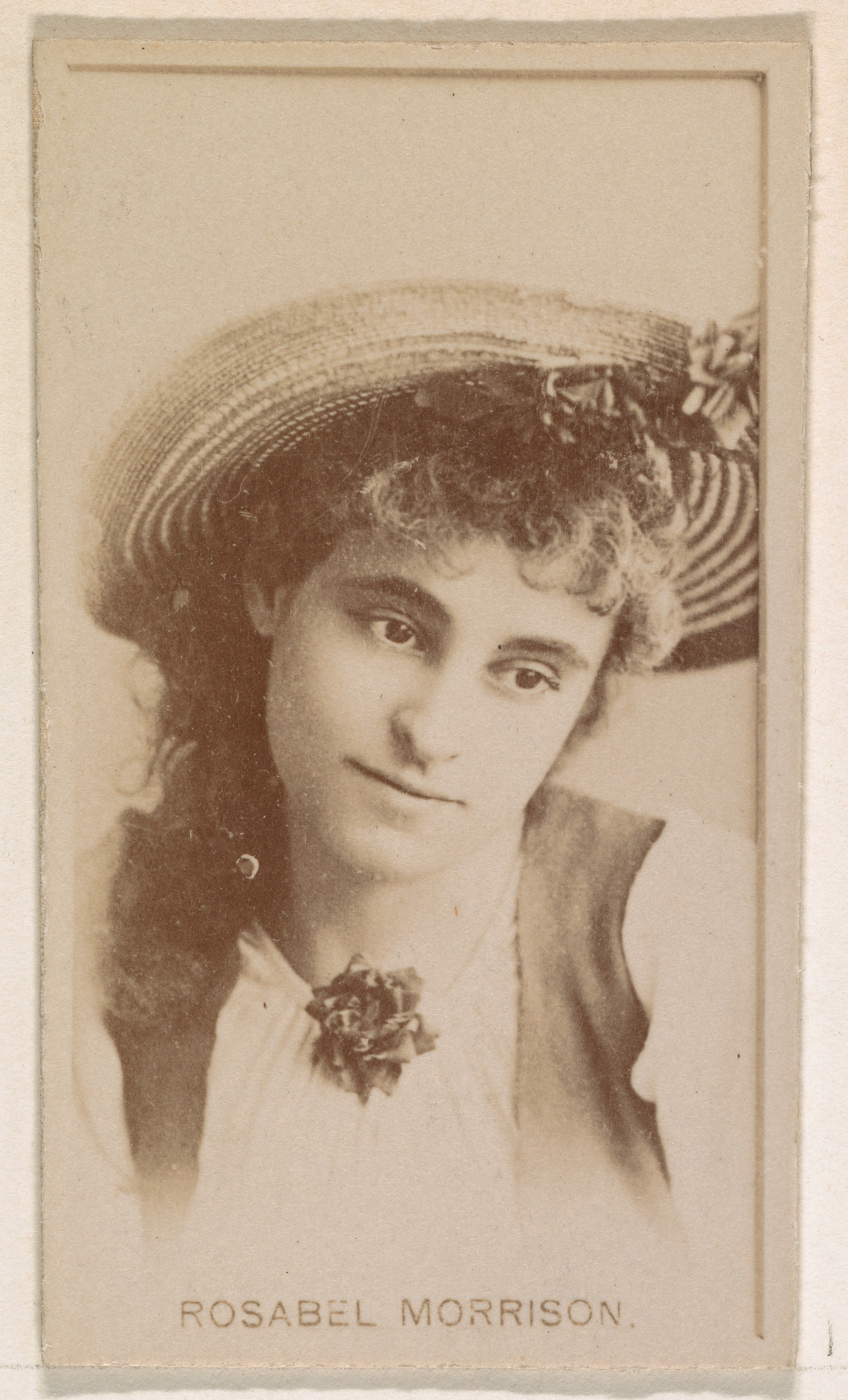
- Born: 1869; New Orleans
- Died: December 19, 1911 (aged 41–42); New York
- Occupation: Actor
- Spouse(s): Edward Abrams, Mitchell Lewis
- Children: Lewis Morrison, Harry Morrison
- Parent(s): Lewis Morrison; Rose Wood
- Relatives: Adrienne Morrison

Rosabel Morrison (1869 – December 19, 1911) was an American stage actor.

Rosabel Morrison was born on 1869 in New Orleans, the daughter of stage actors Rose Wood and Lewis Morrison. Morrison began acting as a teenager in 1885, appearing alongside her father as Adrienne in A Celebrated Case and Marguerite in Faust. One of her most prominent roles was in the railroad play The Danger Signal (1891) by Henry C. de Mille. A fellow cast member, musician Paul Dresser, became infatuated with Morrison and dedicated two songs to her: "Rosie, Sweet Rosabel" and "I Told Her the Same Old Story." In 1899, Morrison originated the role of Leah in Children of the Ghetto by Israel Zangwill at the Herald Square Theatre.

While performing as Dago Annie in A Romance of the Underworld at Hammerstein's Theatre Rosabel Morrison fainted in her dressing room. She died the next day, 19 December 1911.

== Personal life ==
Rosabel Morrison married Edward Abrams; they divorced in 1907. Their children Lewis and Harry took her last name. Her second husband was actor Mitchell Lewis; they married in 1910.
