= Star of Burma =

83-carat cabochon-cut star ruby

- 1935 Vogue advertisement for the Star of Burma ruby
- Type of stone: Ruby
- Weight: 83 carats (16.6 g)
- Color: Pigeon blood
- Cut: Cabochon
- Country of origin: Burma
- Owner: Trabert & Hoeffer-Mauboussin

The Star of Burma is an 83-carat (16.6 g) cabochon-cut star ruby. In 1935, the Burmese ruby was purchased by Howard Hoeffer of jeweler Trabert & Hoeffer-Mauboussin, whereupon it was used in several Hollywood films in the 1930s, including the musical comedy Vogues of 1938. Trabert & Hoeffer-Mauboussin sold the jewel on September 14, 2004.

== Description ==
The 83-carat Star of Burma is a cabochon-cut star ruby with a pigeon-blood color. The color, common to Burmese rubies, is among the most coveted of ruby colors. The jewel's setting was never signed. An advertisement for the jeweler in the 1935 issue of Vogue depicted the ruby as mounted in a platinum pendant or brooch, surrounded by diamonds, and described that "in all the world there is not another like it".

== History ==
The ruby came from a mine in Burma, present-day Myanmar. At the time, Burmese rubies were considered the finest in the world. Trabert & Hoeffer had formed a working partnership with the French jeweler Mauboussin from 1935 to 1953; this partnership allowed Trabert & Hoeffer access to European jewels. Around this time, the Netherlands' House of Orange-Nassau quietly sold numerous gems to jewelers including Trabert & Hoeffer-Mauboussin, including the Star of Burma, to Howard Hoeffer of Trabert & Hoeffer-Mauboussin in 1935. At a diamond fashion show and preview of the film Rhodes of Africa in 1936, Mary Lewis wore the Star of Burma set in a necklace's pendant, which also contained 6,000 diamonds and 150 rubies.

The 1937 film Vogues of 1938 showcased costumes using name brands, including clothes by Omar Kiam, designer furs by Jaeckel, shoes by I. Miller & Sons, handbags and hats by John Fredericks and Sally Victor, and jewels by Trabert & Hoeffer-Mauboussin. The title sequence was of Joan Bennett's gloved hand wearing a diamond and platinum bracelet with the Star of Burma, pulling open curtains to reveal the opening credits. The gem was also worn in the 1937 film Hollywood Hotel, and as a pendant from a ruby and diamond necklace by Tamara Geva in the 1937 film Manhattan Merry-Go-Round.

The Jewels of Trabert & Hoeffer-Mauboussin, published in 2014, describes that the jeweler's most valuable gems, including the Star of Burma, were lent and sometimes sold after Howard Hoeffer established stores in resort communities in the late 1930s. The jewel was sold at fine art and jewelry auctioneer Doyle New York, at a September 14, 2004 auction, where the jewel was the primary highlight of the event.

== See also ==
- 1930s in Western fashion
- Cinema of the United States
