= Children of the Ghetto (film) =

1915 silent film by Frank Powell

- Directed by: Frank Powell
- Screenplay by: Edward José
- Based on: The Children of the Ghetto: A Study of a Peculiar People by Israel Zangwill
- Produced by: William Fox
- Starring: Wilton Lackaye; Ruby Hoffman; Ethel Kaufman; Frank Andrews
- Production company: Box Office Attraction Co.
- Distributed by: Box Office Attraction Co. Fox Film Corp.
- Release date: 1915
- Country: United States
- Language: English

Children of the Ghetto is a 1915 William Fox film with Broadway star Wilton Lackaye. Israel Zangwill wrote the story. Production of the film by the Box Office Attractions Company began in late December 1914 at the Pathe Studio in New York. When presented for exhibition in late January 1915, it comprised five reels.

Children of the Ghetto in scrollable PDF format (open file to view)

Frank Powell directed. Advertisements for the film are extant.

The film was based on Zangwill's The Children of the Ghetto: A Study of a Peculiar People by Israel (London, 1892) and his play Children of the Ghetto (New York, October 16, 1899).

== See also ==
- The Girls of the Ghetto
