= Lorinda Roland =

American sculptor (1938-2022)

- Born: April 21, 1938; Manhattan, New York, U.S.
- Died: August 31, 2022 (aged 84)
- Education: Finch College (AA); Cranbrook Academy of Art (BFA)
- Parents: Gilbert Roland (father); Constance Bennett (mother)
- Relatives: Richard Bennett and Adrienne Morrison (grandparents); Barbara Bennett and Joan Bennett (aunts); Henry de La Falaise (stepfather)
- Awards: Guggenheim Fellowship (1963)

Lorinda Roland (April 21, 1938 – August 31, 2022) was an American sculptor. Born to an acting family, she became interested in sculpture while attending Finch College and studied art during her youth. A 1963 Guggenheim Fellow, she created sculptures made of bronze and copper. She later lived in Orcas Island for the last 35 years of her life, holding a few solo exhibitions there.

== Biography ==
=== Early life and education ===
Lorinda Roland was born on April 21, 1938, in Manhattan. She was the daughter of actors Constance Bennett and Gilbert Roland, and had two siblings. Her maternal grandparents were actors Richard Bennett and Adrienne Morrison, her maternal aunts were actresses Barbara Bennett and Joan Bennett, and her stepfather was filmmaker and noble Henry de La Falaise.

After studying at a Swiss boarding school, Roland graduated from Holton-Arms School. She obtained an AA from Finch College in 1957 and a BFA from the Cranbrook Academy of Art in 1960. She also studied at the Skowhegan School of Painting and Sculpture in 1959, as well as the Art Students League of New York. She was a 1961-1962 Louis Comfort Tiffany Foundation Scholar.

Roland became interested in sculpture while attending Finch, having gotten into clay at an art supply store after remembering some childhood memories. She was awarded a 1963 Guggenheim Fellowship for sculpture, and she won $100 at the 12th Annual All-City Art Festival in June 1964. She once exhibited at the Audubon Artists Annual Exhibition.

=== Life in Los Angeles ===
Roland's opening exhibition was held in Silvan Simone Gallery in West Los Angeles in April 1966, with her father attending. It featured Roland's bronze and copper sculptures collectively titled Earth Children, drawing inspiration from the poem The Wanderings of Oisin. Jeanne Good remarked that Roland's talent "defies the traditional treatment of an art review". In 1981, she created a three-dimensional brass wall sculpture for the then-newly-opened Desert Horizons Country Club. She also created the sculptures in Ken Harrison’s studio for the film Whose Life Is It Anyway?, also released that year.

Roland's work focused on animals, and Good noted that her work "causes animal grace and alertness and man's strength and beauty to remain constant in the forever of bronze and copper." In addition to bronze and copper, she also used gold, silver, and Dutch metal in her work. Her work was also in the private collections of celebrities like actress Cloris Leachman.

A native of Los Angeles, Roland was briefly based in Manhattan during her art career. She often appeared on the media in light of her familial connections to Hollywood; Jack O'Brian reported in 1966 that her "sculptures have a $7,500 top tag on 'em and she isn't even dead a few hundred years," and she appeared on Norma Lee Browning's 1968 Chicago Tribune Magazine feature on the non-showbiz children of Hollywood celebrities, being described as a "very good" sculptor. In 1984, a life partner died in a motorcycle accident.

=== Life in Orcas Island and death ===
In February 1987, Roland moved to Orcas Island after going on a trip there with a friend from Seattle the year before. In August 1990, she held another solo exhibition at Orcas Center. In 1992, she and painter Billy Davis designed the set for the annual Whale of a Show stage production at Orcas Center; The Islands' Sounder called her and Davis "two of the island’s finest artists". She also had another show, Forms of the Body, the Earth and the Mind, held at Clarion Gallery in Eastsound in November 1993. She also taught children as part of the Washington State Arts Commission-funded Leaning to See program.

In March 1992, Roland's bronze statue The Warrior, depicting a nude sexually-aroused man with upraised arms, became a subject of controversy due to its sexually explicit nature. Roland defended the statue as "meant to express inward joy and positive, healthy sexuality" and denied that it was meant to be sexual in nature, and the board of trustees of Orcas Center (who hosted the statue at their lobby) decided to keep the statue. The statue was later stolen from the Orcas Center premises, before being found with minor damage to its ankle.

A long-time lover of animals, Roland also worked in wildlife rehabilitation. She coordinated a program for the Animal Protection Society of the San Juans to provide foster care for lost pets on Orcas. She was Orcas Island's representative for the Wolf Hollow Wildlife Rehabilitation Center. She attempted to place an initiative for the restoration of car tab fees on the ballot, but it failed to get enough signatures for the 2005 Washington elections. In 2006, she was elected to the San Juan Citizens County Salary Commission.

Living with two caregivers during her later years, Roland died in her sleep on August 31, 2022.
