= Manhattan Merry-Go-Round (film) =

1937 film by Charles Reisner

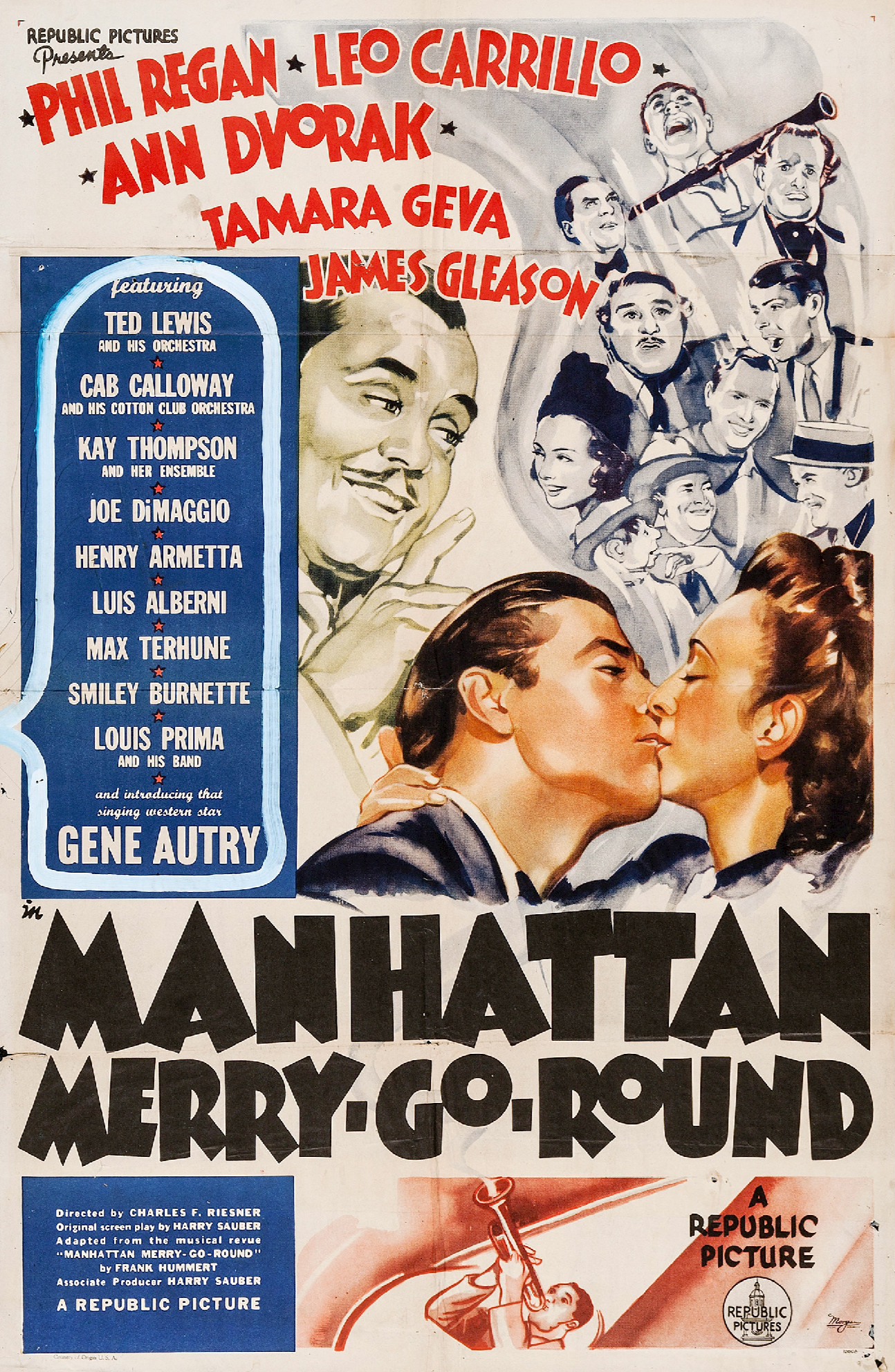
- Manhattan Merry-Go-Round promotional film poster
- Directed by: Charles Reisner
- Written by: Frank Hummert (musical revue); Harry Sauber (screenplay)
- Produced by: Harry Sauber (associate producer)
- Starring: Phil Regan; Leo Carrillo; Ann Dvorak
- Cinematography: Jack A. Marta
- Edited by: Ernest J. Nims
- Music by: Alberto Colombo
- Production company: Republic Pictures
- Distributed by: Republic Pictures
- Release date: November 26, 1937 (United States)
- Running time: 89 minutes
- Country: United States
- Language: English

Manhattan Merry-Go-Round is a 1937 American comedy film directed by Charles Reisner and starring Phil Regan, Leo Carrillo and Ann Dvorak. It was produced and distributed by Republic Pictures. It was nominated for an Academy Award for Best Art Direction by John Victor Mackay.

The film is also known as Manhattan Music Box in the United Kingdom.

== Plot summary ==
A group of gangsters take over a record company, now they strong-arm various celebrities into making records.

== Cast ==
- Phil Regan as Jerry Hart
- Leo Carrillo as Tony Gordoni
- Ann Dvorak as Ann Rogers
- Tamara Geva as Madame "Charlie" Charlizzini
- James Gleason as Danny The Duck
- Ted Lewis and His Orchestra as Themselves
- Cab Calloway and His Cotton Club Orchestra as Themselves
- Kay Thompson and Her Ensemble as Themselves
- Joe DiMaggio as himself - the Baseball Player
- Henry Armetta as Spadoni
- Luis Alberni as Martinetti, the Impresario
- Max Terhune as himself, Alibi - the Ventriloquist
- Smiley Burnette as Frog - Accordion Player
- Louis Prima and His Band as Themselves
- Gene Autry as himself - the Cowboy Star

Louis Prima, Jack Adair, Dorothy Arnold, Stanley Blystone, Hal Craig, Gennaro Curci, Virginia Dabney, Anna Demetrio, Neal Dodd, Ralph Edwards, Elmer, Sam Finn, Al Herman, Jack Jenney and His Orchestra, Selmer Jackson, Kay Thompson, Eddie Kane, Joe King, The Lathrops, but Whitey's Lindy Hoppers, Frankie Marvin, Nellie V. Nichols, Moroni Olsen, Bob Perry, Al Rinker, Rosalean and Seville, Gertrude Short and Thelma Wunder also appear.

== Soundtrack ==
- "Manhattan Merry-Go-Round" (Music by Saul Chaplin, lyrics by Sammy Cahn)
- Joe DiMaggio - "Have You Ever Been to Heaven" (Music by Peter Tinturin, lyrics by Jack Lawrence)
- Ted Lewis and His Orchestra and sung by Phil Regan - "Have You Ever Been to Heaven"
- Phil Regan and chorus with Gene Autry's band - "Have You Ever Been to Heaven"
- Louis Prima and His Band and sung by Phil Regan - "I Owe You" (Music by Peter Tinturin, lyrics by Jack Lawrence)
- Phil Regan and by Kay Thompson with Jack Jenney and His Orchestra - "I Owe You"
- Ted Lewis and His Orchestra - "When My Baby Smiles at Me" (Music by Bill Munro, lyrics by Ted Lewis and Andrew Sterling)
- Ted Lewis and played by his orchestra - "I'm a Musical Magical Man" (Music by Saul Chaplin, lyrics by Sammy Cahn)
- Jack Jenney and His Orchestra and Kay Thompson on piano and sung by Kay Thompson and Her Ensemble - "All Over Nothing at All" (Music by Peter Tinturin, lyrics by Jack Lawrence)
- Cab Calloway and His Cotton Club Orchestra - "Minnie the Moocher" (Written by Cab Calloway, Irving Mills and Clarence Gaskill)
- Cab Calloway and played by Cab Calloway and His Cotton Club Orchestra - "Mama, I Wanna Make Rhythm" (Written by Jerome Jerome, Richard Byron and Walter Kent)
- Phil Regan - "Mama, I Wanna Make Rhythm"
- Gene Autry's band with Gene Autry and Smiley Burnette - "It's Round Up Time in Reno" (Written by Gene Autry, Jack Owens and Jack Lawrence)

== See also ==
- Manhattan Merry-Go-Round
- Star of Burma
