= Shelley Hull =

American actor

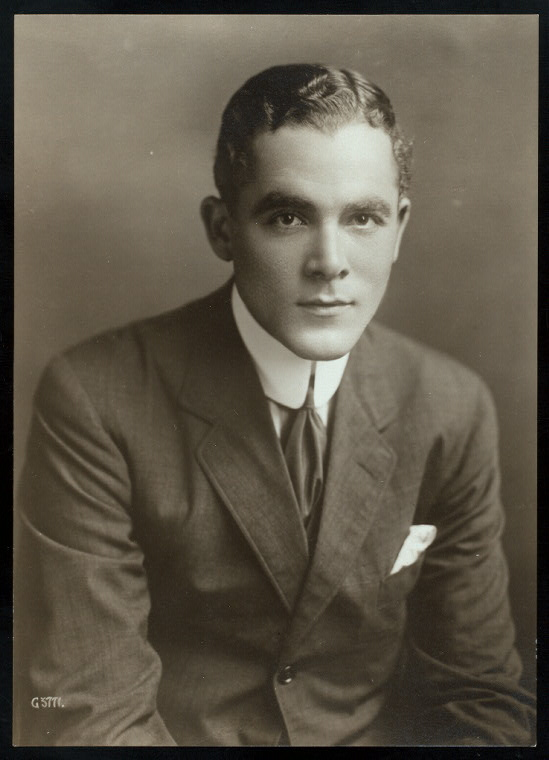
- Born: Shelley Vaughan Hull; June 17, 1884; Louisville, Kentucky, U.S.
- Died: January 14, 1919 (aged 34); New York City, U.S.
- Resting place: Newton Cemetery and Crematory, Newton, Massachusetts
- Other name: Shelley Hull
- Occupation: Actor
- Years active: 1903–1919
- Spouse: Josephine Sherwood (m. 1910)
- Relatives: Henry Hull (brother); Margaret Anglin (sister-in-law)

Shelley Vaughan Hull (June 17, 1884 – January 14, 1919) was an American stage actor who also appeared in two silent motion pictures. His Broadway popularity as a suave handsome leading man was continually on the rise until his early death at age 34 in the Influenza pandemic of 1918.

== Early life ==
Hull was born in Louisville, Kentucky, the middle son of William Madison Hull, a theater manager and drama critic, and his wife, Elinor Bond Vaughn. After the family moved to New York City in 1902, the three sons eventually went into the theater business: the eldest, Howard, married acclaimed actress Margaret Anglin, and younger brother Henry Hull, became a well-known actor on stage and in Hollywood films.

In 1910, Hull married actress Josephine Sherwood, who, as Josephine Hull, was a successful stage performer throughout her long life and became an Oscar-winning character actress.

== Career ==
For fifteen years, from 1903 to 1918, Hull appeared in 17 Broadway plays, enhancing his acting reputation in comedy and serious drama with each production. A frequent description of his stage work is that he "combined boyishness with an incontestable manliness, and grace with a telling force, as the best young actor in his field." Hull was a particular favorite of the young Billie Burke and costarred with her in three consecutive plays over a year's time. In 1917, he costarred in Why Marry?, the first play to win the Pulitzer Prize for Drama. In Bertie Thomas's Under Orders, a British import that opened in August 1918, he impressed critics with his dual casting as an American (Arthur Ford) and his German cousin (Captain Hartzmann of the Imperial Guards), who find themselves fighting on either side of The Great War before taking refuge in each other's countries. His ability to portray both young men as decent human beings trapped in the fog of war won critical raves from, for one, Dorothy Parker, who wrote, "If the author had let Shelley Hull get killed, not a woman in the audience would ever have smiled again."

A decade into his stage career, he appeared in the first of his two silent films, Sapho (1913). His second and last film, An Honorable Cad (1919), was released nine months after his death that January.

== Death ==
Four and a half months into the run of Under Orders—his biggest hit to date—he fell ill and died of influenza, age 34, on January 14, 1919. The production closed due to his death. Lamenting the loss to the theater profession, one critic commented that, "had Hull lived longer, he might have become an American Leslie Howard." Hull is buried in Newton, Massachusetts.

== Broadway plays ==
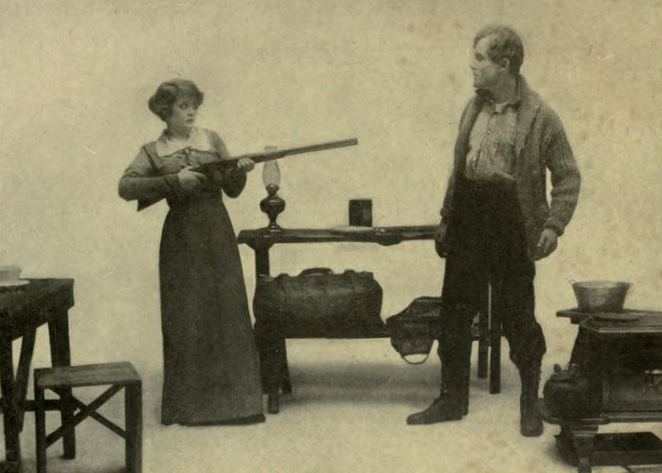
Billie Burke and Shelley Hull in The Land of Promise

- Sweet Kitty Bellairs (1903)
- The Crossing (1906)
- The Bridge (1909)
- Electricity (1910)
- The Foolish Virgin (1910)
- Seven Sisters (1911) (with Laurette Taylor)
- Lady Patricia (1912) (with Mrs. Fiske)
- Chains (1912)
- The Amazons (1913) (with Billie Burke)
- The Land of Promise (1913) (with Billie Burke) (*filmed by Burke and Thomas Meighan in 1917 as The Land of Promise and again by Meighan in 1926 as The Canadian)
- Jerry (1914) (with Billie Burke)
- The Cinderella Man (1916)
- The Willow Tree (1917) (with Fay Bainter)
- The Lassoo (1917)
- Why Marry? (1917)
- Laurette Taylor in Scenes from Shakespeare (1918) (as Petruchio)
- Under Orders (1918)
