= Sapho (1913 film) =

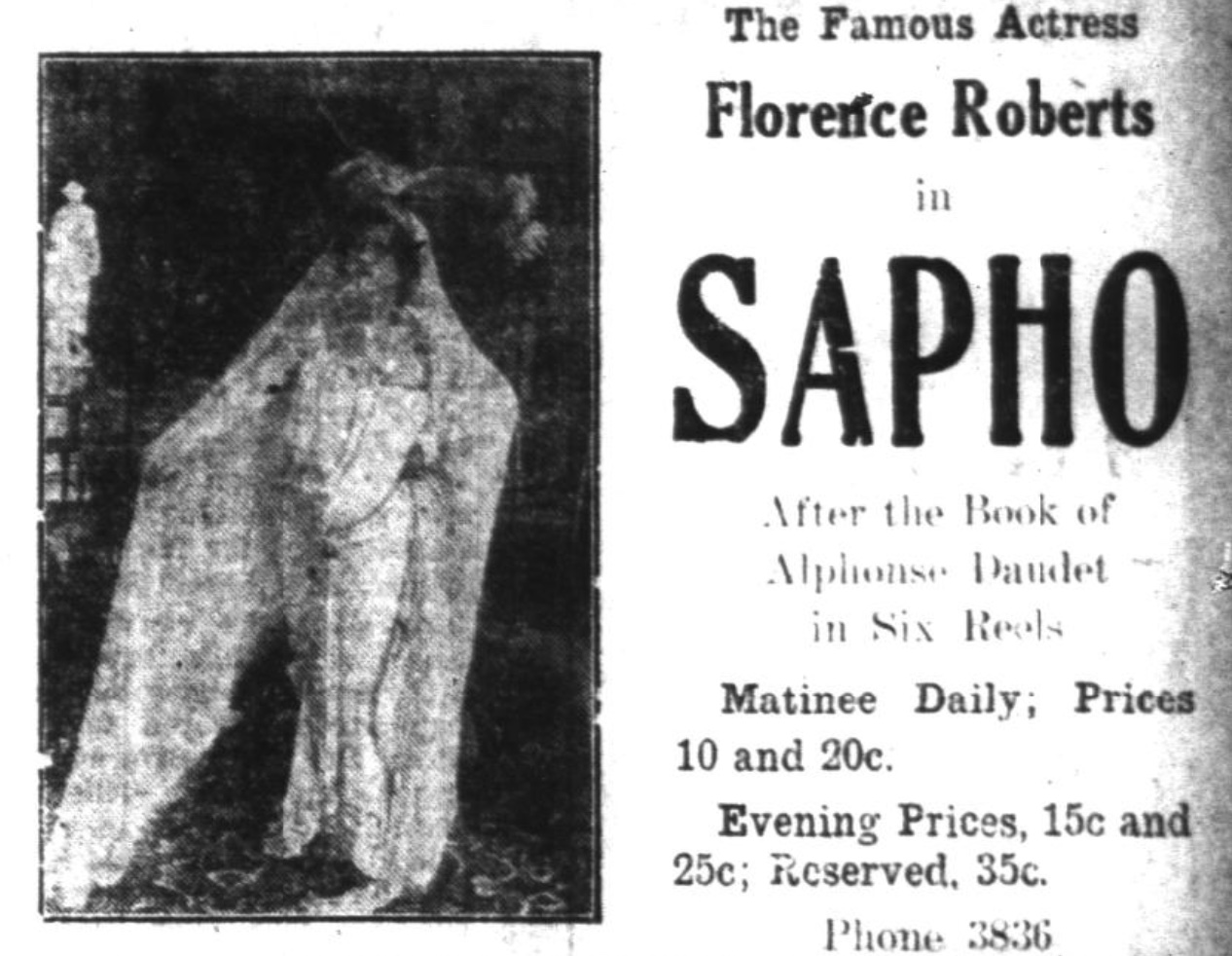
- Contemporary advertisement
- Directed by: Lucius Henderson
- Written by: Daniel Carson Goodman
- Based on: novel, Sappho, by Alphonse Daudet and Adolphe Belot
- Produced by: Majestic Motion Picture Company
- Starring: Florence Roberts; Shelley Hull
- Distributed by: State Rights (*World's Special Films)
- Release date: October 1913
- Running time: 6 reels
- Country: USA
- Languages: Silent; English titles

Sapho is a 1913 silent film feature drama directed by Lucius Henderson and is based on the novel by Alphonse Daudet and its stage adaptation by Daudet and Adolphe Belot. It stars stage actress Florence Roberts and Shelley Hull. It was produced by the Majestic Motion Picture Company and released by World's Special Films. As with Queen Elizabeth (1912) and Resurrection (1912), the film was one of the first features to star a major actress known by name. It competed with a four-reel French film that same year, 1913.

Sapho as a play, written by Clyde Fitch, was produced by Olga Nethersole on Broadway in 1900 to acclaim but also tinged with scandal as the play ran afoul of the New York Police Department, who shut it down for a time and arrested its stars Olga Nethersole and Hamilton Revelle.

The play was next filmed in 1917 as Sapho starring Pauline Frederick.

== Cast ==
- Florence Roberts - Fanny Le Grand/Sapho
- Shelley Hull - Jean
- Arthur Cadwell Jr. - Joseph
- Lamar Johnstone - *uncredited

== Preservation ==
Sapho is currently presumed lost. In February of 2021, the film was cited by the National Film Preservation Board on their Lost U.S. Silent Feature Films list.
