= Frank Worthing =

American actor (1866–1910)

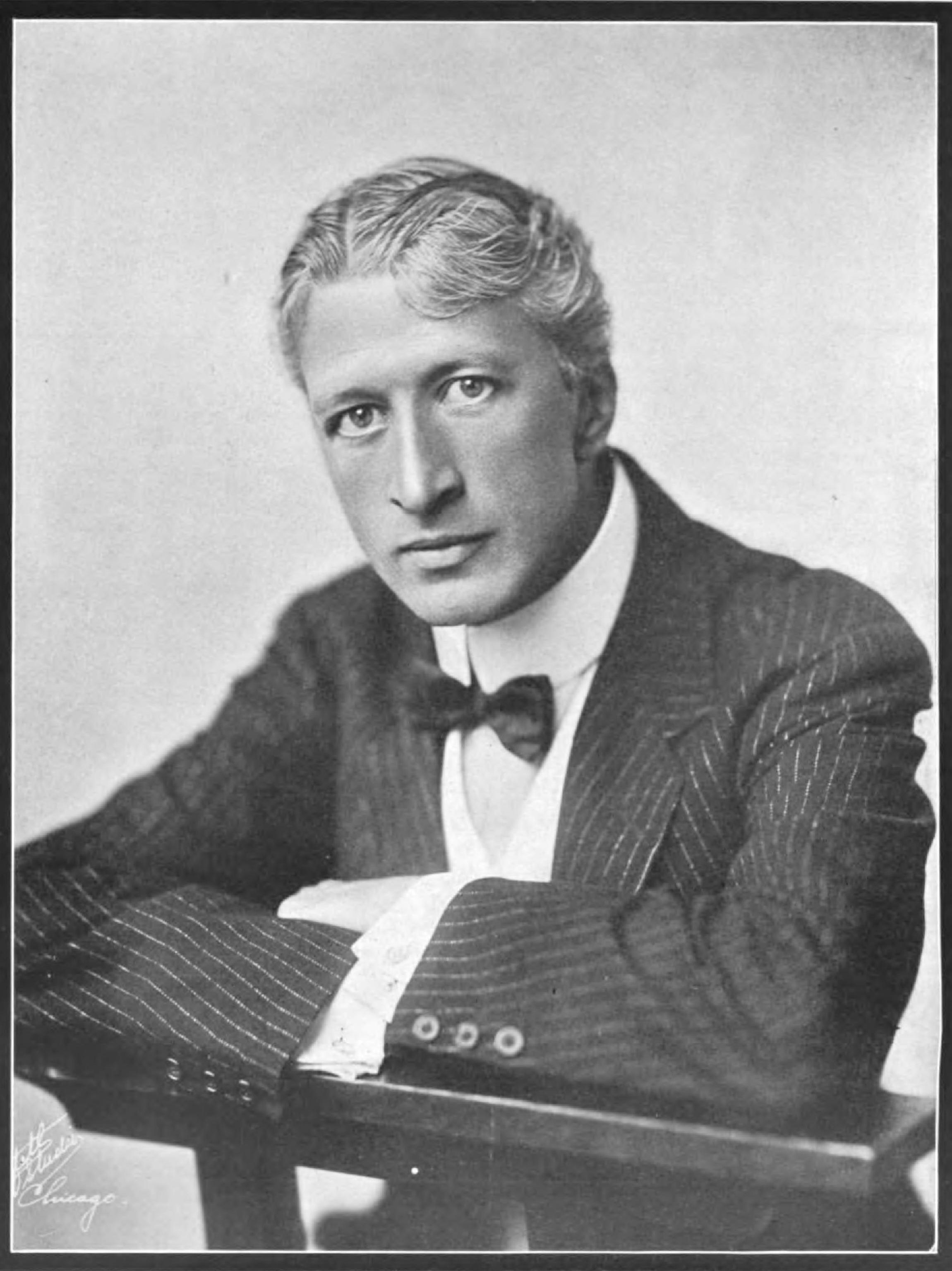
- ca. 1909
- Born: George Francis Pentland; October 12, 1866; Edinburgh, Scotland
- Died: December 27, 1910 (age 44); Detroit, Michigan
- Occupation: Actor

Frank Worthing (October 12, 1866 – December 27, 1910) was a Scottish born American stage actor. He was well respected on the Broadway stage and his early death at 44 brought considerable mourning from his fellow actors and costars. He worked for producers Charles Dillingham, William A. Brady and David Belasco and starred opposite Amelia Bingham and Clara Bloodgood in The Climbers by Clyde Fitch.

== Life ==
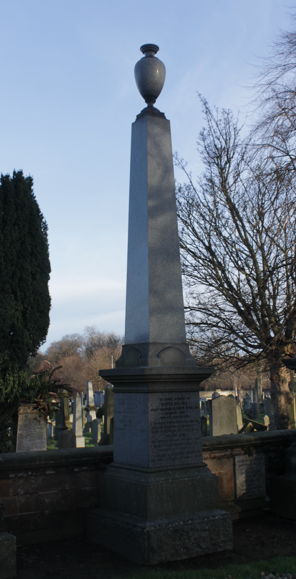
The Pentland grave in Rosebank Cemetery in Edinburgh

He was born Francis (Frank) George Pentland the seventh of fourteen children to Young Johnston Pentland (d.1906) and his wife Jeanie Muir (d.1905) of 13 Spence's Place in Leith north of Edinburgh. Spence's Place was later renamed Bonnington Road. The family ran a cooperage serving Leith's whisky trade. Frank originally studied medicine at Edinburgh University but abandoned this. He was a member of the Edinburgh Dramatic Society. A friend, Walter Hatton of the Theatre Royal in Edinburgh, obtained a post at 15 shillings a week as prompter and support actor with a repertory company in South Shields. After treading the boards with several companies he went to Worthing to study at the Academy of Acting there. Here he decided to take the stage name Frank Worthing, also distancing himself from his actor brother David Nicol Pentland.

He made his London debut in 1888 and drew the positive attention of the critics. In 1890 he was chosen by Mrs Patrick Campbell to play Orlando against her performance of Rosalind in "As You Like It" at the Shaftesbury Theatre. He was then selected by Lily Langtry to join a touring company and played Marc Anthony in "Caesar and Cleopatra", Pygmalion in "Pygmalion and Galetea" and Charles Surface in "The School for Scandal" the last becoming a much-repeated role. After a brief spell with Henry Irving he signed a contract with Charles Wyndham at the Criterion Theatre.

In 1894 he was encouraged by his friend Olga Nethersole to join Augustin Daly's company on a tour to New York. Thereafter he played roles alternatively in London and New York. In London his further roles included Armand Duval in "Camille - The Lady of the Camelias" for Mrs Patrick Campbell in London and Lt Pinkerton in Madame Butterfly in New York with Blanche Bates in 1900 (preceding the more famous opera written in 1904 based on this play). In New York he had a swanky apartment overlooking Central Park. He occasionally visited his family in Edinburgh who had moved to "The Cottage", a villa at 50 East Trinity Road in the Trinity district.

In 1896 he fell in love with Maxine Elliott while playing with the Daly Company in San Francisco. She returned to New York with him and both played roles in "The Two Escutcheons. However, the comedian Nat Goodwin also loved Maxine and made her "an offer she could not refuse" to act with him in Australia, removing her as far as possible from Frank. Frank fainted when he heard the news. Thereafter he put all effort into his acting. At some point in the early 20th century he contracted tuberculosis. In 1908 he was in hospital with pneumonia and was told he would never work again. He did not cease. He made one final trip to Edinburgh, returning to New York on the new (but later ill-fated) RMS Lusitania.

His final role was to be in "Sauce for the Goose" opposite Grace George. A touring show in left New York late in December 1910. He suffered a haemorhage of the lung soon after leaving New York. Nevertheless, he made one performance on 26 December at the Garrick Theatre in Detroit. On the evening of 27 December, preparing to perform, he collapsed at the stage door. He died 20 minutes later. His body was returned to New York for burial. The service was conducted at the Little Church Around The Corner on 30 December and he was buried in a family plot with Pentland siblings in Greenwood Cemetery, Brooklyn.

A year after his death he was the subject of a biography titled In Memory of Frank Worthing, actor by Harvard theatre critic William Winter.

== Memorials ==
Other than his own grave in Brooklyn he is also memorialised on the family grave in Edinburgh at Rosebank Cemetery. The large granite obelisk topped by an urn, stands in the centre of the cemetery just west of the set of steps rising to the central raised area.
