= Rosabel Tan =

New Zealand writer and creative artist

- Education: University of Auckland, Victoria University of Wellington
- Occupations: Writer, strategist, creative producer, researcher, editor
- Employer(s): Director of Satellites, founding editor of The Pantograph Punch
- Website: https://rosabeltan.com/

Rosabel Tan is a New Zealand writer, strategist and creative producer of Peranakan Chinese descent. She advocates for the arts in New Zealand, specifically highlighting the work of Asian diaspora artists. Tan's key roles include being a director of Satellites and a founding editor of Pantograph Punch (2010-2024).

== Life and career ==
Tan moved to New Zealand at the age of eight. She used drama and creative arts as a vehicle for self-expression and connection with others.

Later she completed a Master of Arts in Psychology with the University of Auckland, and a Master of Arts with distinction in Creative Writing through the International Institute of Modern Letters Writing Programme at Victoria University of Wellington. As a University of Auckland Liggins Institute Research Assistant, she had two psychology papers published in the academic journals Personal Relationships and Journal of Personality and Social Psychology. Additionally in 2016 she worked as a Senior Research Analyst at Morris Hargreaves McIntyre (a UK-based research consultancy) to expand her knowledge on communication between the arts sector and their audiences.

Tan was also a recipient of the Lancewood/Horoeka Reading Grant in 2015, a summer programme where she strengthened skills surrounding analysis of works and providing critiques. However she first fed her passion for writing in 2009 as theatre and arts editor for the University of Auckland's student magazine, Cracuum. She then became a founding editor of Pantograph Punch arts and culture journal in late 2010, alongside Matt Harnett and Joe Nunweek, until approximately 2016. During her time at Pantograph Punch she held a range of roles including director from 2010 - 2019, a board member from 2013 - 2024, and Mema Poari Secretary from 2017-2024.

Tan has collaborated with other creatives to produce installations, written publications, panel discussions, and events, as well as exhibiting and publishing her own solo works. Her level of engagement has seen her in the following roles: contributing editor at Paperboy in 2018, a Talks programmer for Auckland Arts Festival from 2019 - 2020, a guest judge in residency as Studio One Toi Tū in 2021, Curator Asia for the Auckland Writers Festival in 2022, a co-programmer for Verb Festival, and a programme manager for The Next Page. Tan has contributed her time to multiple governance groups including Pantograph Punch, Silo Theatre, The Public Art Advisory Panel for Auckland Council, and Te Rōpū Mana Toi Creative New Zealand Advocacy Advisory.

She is a director of Satellites, an online platform advocating for and supporting New Zealand artists of Asian descent.

== Projects ==
Many of her projects have been presented at the Auckland Arts Festival, Te Papa Tongarewa, Taranaki Arts Festival, CubaDupa, and Hamilton Gardens Arts Festival.

Creative Productions
Year	Project	Medium	Source
2018	The Claw	Playable claw machine installation in a shop	^^^
2020	Maree Sheehan's Ōtairongo	Aural portraits of mana wāhine Māori	^^^
2021	Hit Me Baby One More Rhyme	Poetry karaoke installation	^^^
	Harvest	Interactive ceramic installation	^^^
2025	An Inheritance	Installation by children of Greater Manchester collaborating with Andy Field, Beckie Darlington, and Rosabel Tan	^^^

The Claw was curated by Tan and a team of artists including Hanna Shim, Adam Ben Dror, Michael McCabe, Amelia Murray, Angus Muir, Hayden Eastmond-Mein, Louis Olsen, Scott Satherley, Frith Walker/Panuku, Dawn Sacayan, and Helen Sheehan. The work was originally commissioned by Auckland Council for an empty storefront in Northcote, Auckland but its meaning evolved over time. It was later on show at Aigantighe Art Gallery, Timaru, from 16 March to 5 May 2019. Artist Michael McCabe described it as an interactive innovation that matched the changing landscape of the area and activated the space for passersby. In 2018 the exhibition was awarded Gold by the Designers Institute of New Zealand Best Design Awards in the Spatial Exhibition and Temporary Structures category.

This theme of applying a youthful feel to a thought provoking installation is also seen in An Inheritance by Rosabel Tan, Andy Field, Beckie Darlington and over 500 Year 5 kids from Greater Manchester. The installation was presented at the Manchester Art Gallery for the Manchester International Festival 2025, and remained for viewing from 4 July to 2 November 2025. The exhibitions brings together the ideas of the younger generation on what 2125 could be like and how they wish to leave something behind for that future generation. The gallery states that this compilation of physical goods, written ideas and thoughts were all brought together and then put away at the end of the summer like a time capsule for the next 100 years. Additionally to ensure that the collection remains secure for that period of time a 'special ceremony' with city officials was held to sign on the matter.

Alongside her creative productions, her written works have been published in various magazines and media including Sport, Hue & Cry, 1972, Metro Mag, The Spinoff, and Tell You What: Great New Zealand Non-Fiction 2017.

Written Publications
Date	Title	Site	Genre	Source
13/10/10	The New Zealand Story?	The Pantograph Punch	Article	^^^
2011	Let's talk about us: Attachment, Relationship-focused disclosure, relationship quality	Personal Relationships	Research Paper	^^^
2011	The costs and benefits of sexism: Resistance to influence during relationship conflict	Journal of Personality and Social Psychology	Research Paper	^^^
02/03/11-26/10/13	Constantinople	Te Whare Tapere Tirohanga Hou Theatreview	Theatre Review	^^^
2012	The Souls They Saved	Hue & Cry Journal no. 6, p. 141-150	Short story in issue 'An exercise in optimism'	^^^
08/03/12-01/12/12	Richard Meros Salutes The Southern Man	Te Whare Tapere Tirohanga Hou Theatreview	Theatre Review	^^^
17/03/12-07/04/12	In The Next Room (Or The Vibrator Play)	Te Whare Tapere Tirohanga Hou Theatreview	Theatre Review	^^^
20/03/12-24/03/12	Little Histories Of The Life Ordinary	Te Whare Tapere Tirohanga Hou Theatreview	Theatre Review	^^^
23/02/12-18/03/12	Top Girls	Te Whare Tapere Tirohanga Hou Theatreview	Theatre Review	^^^
18/04/12-02/03/13	Mrs Van Gogh	Te Whare Tapere Tirohanga Hou Theatreview	Theatre Review	^^^
30/05/12-10/06/12	Copenhagen	Te Whare Tapere Tirohanga Hou Theatreview	Theatre Review	^^^
28/06/12-22/07/12	Black Confetti	Te Whare Tapere Tirohanga Hou Theatreview	Theatre Review	^^^
10/08/12-01/09/12	The Pride	Te Whare Tapere Tirohanga Hou Theatreview	Theatre Review	^^^
04/09/14	Real Housewives, True Detectives, and the Purgatory in Between	The SpinOff	Review	^^^
29/10/14	MacGyver's Tips for Answering the Tough Questions	The SpinOff	Interview	^^^
17/11/14	Review: Pure and Deep	The Pantograph Punch	Review	^^^
17/12/14	Inside Armageddon's Ice-Cream Eating Competition	The Pantograph Punch	Internet Histories	^^^
22/12/14	Ten Plays We Loved in 2014: Auckland Edition	The Pantograph Punch	Performance	^^^
09/04/15	The Critic in New Zealand	NZ Poetry Shelf	Essay	^^^
07/11/16	The Pantograph Punch Relaunches	The Pantograph Punch	News	^^^
11/07/16	Critic's Day: Duncan Greive wrote a horrible review of Open Souls. The band recorded a song about him. Years later, they talked it out	The SpinOff	Review	^^^
08/02/17	Lee Mingwei on Creating Acts of Kindness	The Pantograph Punch	Profile	^^^
26/02/17	Strange and Empty Plots: A Review of Spirit House	The Pantograph Punch	Performance review	^^^
20/09/20	How to Feed a Hungry Ghost	City Gallery Wellington Te Whare Toi	Blog post	^^^
23/11/23	New Mirrors: Strengthening Arts and Culture Media for Aotearoa New Zealand	Creative NZ	Report	^^^
Nov 2023	I've polished this anger and now it's a knife - A Conversation	Fine Print Magazine, Issue 33: Complicity	Article	^^^
06/03/24	New Waves: Meeting the Growing Hunger for Asian Art in Aotearoa	Asia New Zealand Foundation	Report	^^^

Panels/Talks
Date	Title	Location	People	Source
09/10/15	Tell Them What You Think - Reviewing Workshop	Enjoy Contemporary Art Space	Rosabel Tan	^^^
Feb-Apr 2016	Intermission - 2016 Auckland Arts Festival podcast series	RNZ	Justin Gregory and Rosabel Tan	^^^
29/10/16-30/10/16	Seen and Heard: Public Displays and Public Discourses a critical writing workshop covened by The Physics Room - Panel Discussion: Writing for a 'general' audience	The Physics Room Contemporary Art Space	Dr Lara Strongman, Anthony Byrt, Sally Blundell, Rosabel Tan	
22/09/18	Making Things Happen	AAAH2018 (Asian Aotearoa Arts) Symposium at Te Papa	Eric Ngan, Allan Xia, Lynda Chanwai-Earle, Rosabel Tan	^^^
02/05/18	She Claims: Art Matters	Auckland Art Gallery	Julia Croft, Rosabel Tan	^^^
24/10/19	Te Whāinga: A Culture Lab on Civility Workshops - At the bottom of every wishing well is a mother asking if you've had lunch	Silo Park, Auckland - Auckland Museum & Smithsonian Asia Pacific American Centre (APAC)	Kerry Ann Lee, Rosabel Tan	^^^
09/11/19	LitCrawl: Ways of Seeing	City Gallery Wellington Te Whare Toi	Sinead Gleeson, Vanessa Crofskey, Mary Macpherson, Megan Dunn, Rosabel Tan	^^^
07/08/22	Rosabel Tan: We Can Build a New Utopia	Ngā Toi Advocacy Network Podcast	Rosabel Tan	^^^
11/10/22-23/12/22	Rūbarū Digital Series: Ling Ma with Rosabel Tan	Verb Wellington (Festival)	Ling Ma, Rosabel Tan	^^^
05/05/23	Rosabel Tan explains the importance of a strong vision for the future	Creative New Zealand YouTube	Rosabel Tan	^^^
13/04/24	On Being Chinese - The Panel	Auckland Art Gallery	Rosabel Tan, Bev Moon, Cindy Huang, Alice Canton	^^^
09/07/25	MIF Artist Talk: An Inheritance	Festival Square (The Social), Aviva Studios, Water Street, Manchester	Andy Field and Rosabel Tan speaking with Low Kee Hong	^^^
