= Lewis Morrison =

Jamaican-born American actor (1844–1906)

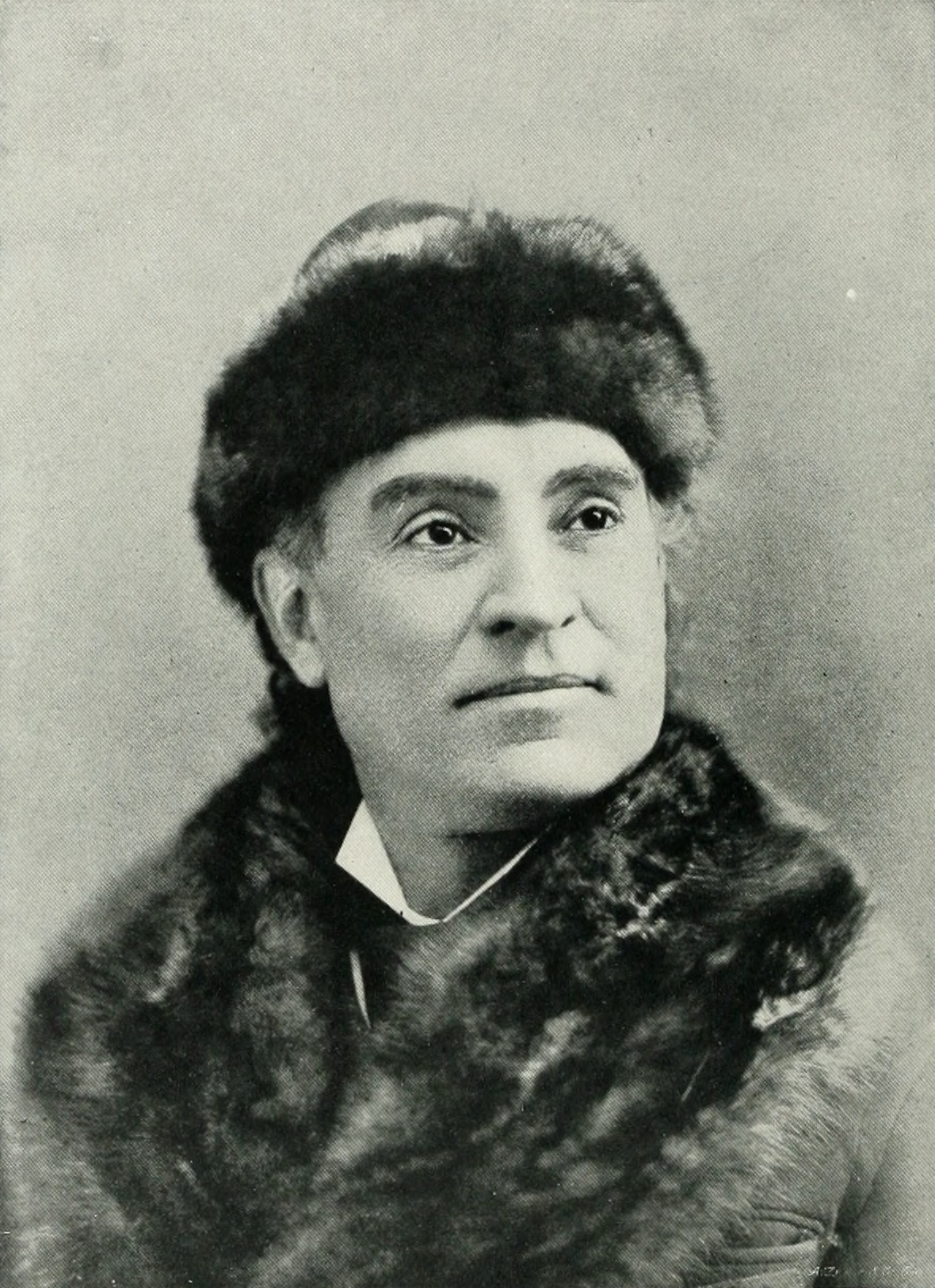
- Lewis Morrison in 1894
- Born: Morris W. Morris; September 4, 1844; Jamaica, British West Indies
- Died: August 18, 1906 (aged 61); Yonkers, New York, United States
- Occupation: Actor
- Spouse(s): Rose Wood (married 1877–1890); Florence Roberts (married 1892–1906)
- Children: 3, including Adrienne Morrison

Lewis Morrison (September 4, 1844 – August 18, 1906) was a Jamaican-born American stage actor and theatrical manager, born Moritz (or Morris) W. Morris. He was best known for his portrayal of Mephistopheles in his own production of Faust, which he performed from 1885 to 1906. He was the father of actress Adrienne Morrison, and grandfather of Constance, Barbara and Joan Bennett.

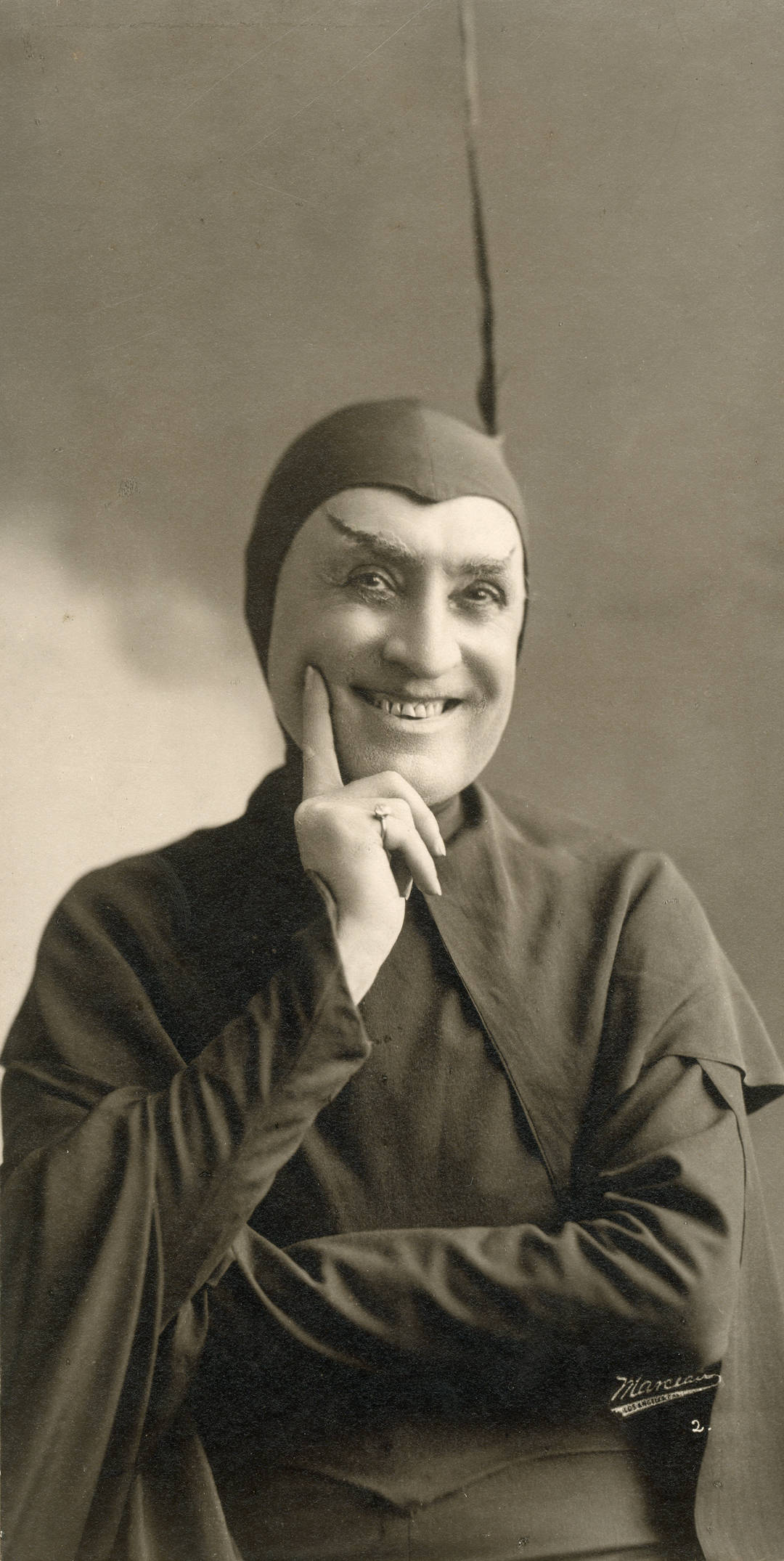
Morrison as Mephistopheles in Faust

== Career ==
Prior to his acting career, Morris W. Morris served as a soldier in the American Civil War As a fresh Jamaican-born immigrant, in 1861, he briefly served as an officer in the Confederate Louisiana militia, with the 1st Louisiana Native Guard (Confederate). He subsequently subsequently served for six weeks in the 1st Louisiana Native Guard (Union). He was unique in that he was of Jewish ancestry, making him both the only black Jewish Confederate officer and the only black Jewish Union officer.

== Personal life ==
Morrison was married first to American actress Rose Wood. He was the father of actresses Rosabel Morrison and Adrienne Morrison; grandfather of actresses Constance, Barbara and Joan Bennett; and great-grandfather of television talk show host Morton Downey Jr.

Morrison and Rose Wood were divorced in 1890. He married the much younger stage actress Florence Roberts in 1892.
