= Adrienne Morrison =

American stage actress (1883–1940)

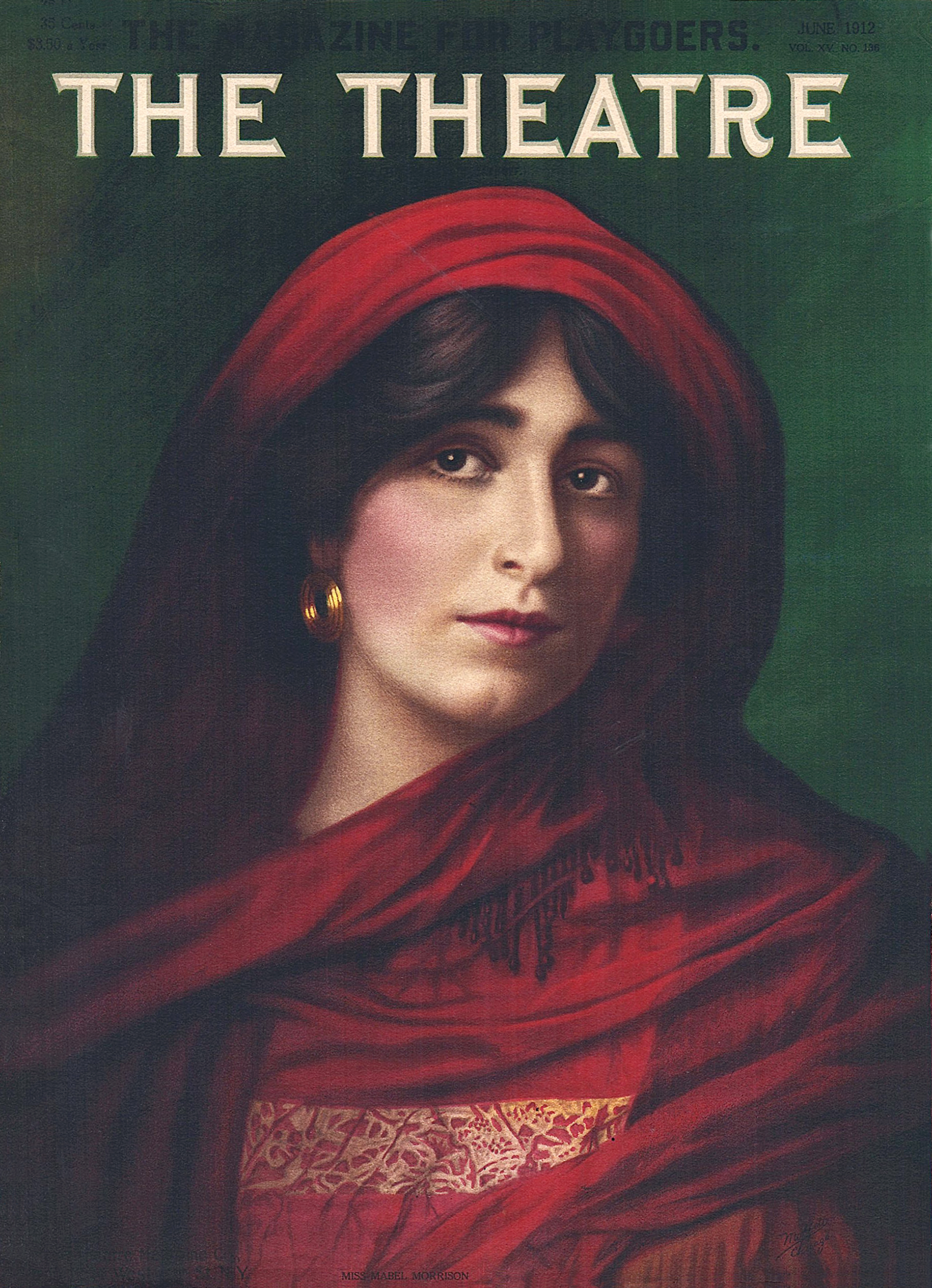
- Morrison on the cover of Theatre Magazine (June 1912)
- Born: Mabel Adrienne Morrison; March 1, 1883; New York, U.S.
- Died: November 20, 1940 (aged 57); New York, U.S.
- Spouses: Richard Bennett (m. 1903; div. 1925) Eric Pinker (m. 1927)
- Children: Constance Bennett; Barbara Bennett; Joan Bennett
- Father: Lewis Morrison
- Relatives: Morton Downey Jr. and Lorinda Roland (grandchildren)

Mabel Adrienne Morrison (March 1, 1883 – November 20, 1940) was an American stage actress of the early 20th century. She married actor Richard Bennett, with whom she had three daughters who later would become actresses.

== Early years ==
Adrienne Morrison was a daughter of actress Rose Wood and actor Lewis Morrison. Her lineage through her mother made Morrison "the seventh generation of an English theatrical family."

Morrison first appeared on stage at 6 months of age when her mother held her during a production of The Cricket on the Hearth. She was educated at St. Gabriel's Convent and the Convent of the Sacred Heart before returning to the stage at 14 years of age to portray Juliet.

== Career ==
In 1905, she appeared as Nat-u-ritch, an Aboriginal American woman, in the play The Squaw Man with William Faversham. From September 1910 through May 1911 she appeared with her husband Richard Bennett in The Deep Purple. She also performed in Damaged Goods, Hamlet, Love for Love, and The Servant in the House.

Morrison retired from the theater in 1926, but made a brief return in May 1940 to appear in Grey Farm at the Hudson Theatre.

From 1930 to 1932, Morrison directed Children's Players, a company of adult actors who presented plays for children in the New York City area, Connecticut, and New Jersey.

== Personal life and death ==
Morrison and actor Richard Bennett married In Jersey City on November 8, 1903, but she retained her maiden name. Their daughters, Barbara Bennett, Constance Bennett, and Joan Bennett, would all become film actresses. Of the three, Joan would become the best known in acting, although both she and Constance would see wide success. Barbara never achieved the success of her sisters in acting, but married Morton Downey, and the couple had five children, with their first born being Morton Downey Jr. Despite Bennett's earnings, he became bankrupt. Another grandchild, Constance's daughter Lorinda Roland, was a sculptor.

In April 1925, she and Richard Bennett divorced. On January 19, 1927, she married Eric Seabrooke Pinker, a dramatic and literary agent, son to James B. Pinker, in an art gallery in New York City. That marriage produced no children, but lasted until her death in her apartment in New York City of a heart attack in 1940. She was buried in a family plot in Pleasant Valley Cemetery in Old Lyme, Connecticut.

== Legal problems ==
On June 7, 1939, Pinker was sentenced to a term of 2 1/2 to five years in Sing Sing prison for theft of approximately $30,000 from two clients. An investigation by the office of District Attorney Thomas E. Dewey indicated that Pinker used money owed to those clients to pay money due to other clients. The audit also indicated that Pinker had taken about $109,000 from other writers whom he represented. Morrison had been a partner in the firm, Eric S. Pinker & Adrienne Morrison, Inc., dealing with drama clients while Pinker handled literary clients. She resigned from the business on June 2, 1937. Pinker said that Morrison was not involved with the theft, but at the time of Pinker's sentencing, an assistant district attorney told the judge that a complaint had been made against Morrison and "we are considering ... whether there should be a prosecution."

In October, 1939, Morrison's residence in Lyme, Connecticut, was attached as a result of a $25,000 suit by a playwright who alleged that she "failed to report all proceeds" from a play.
