= Joan Bennett =

American actress (1910–1990)

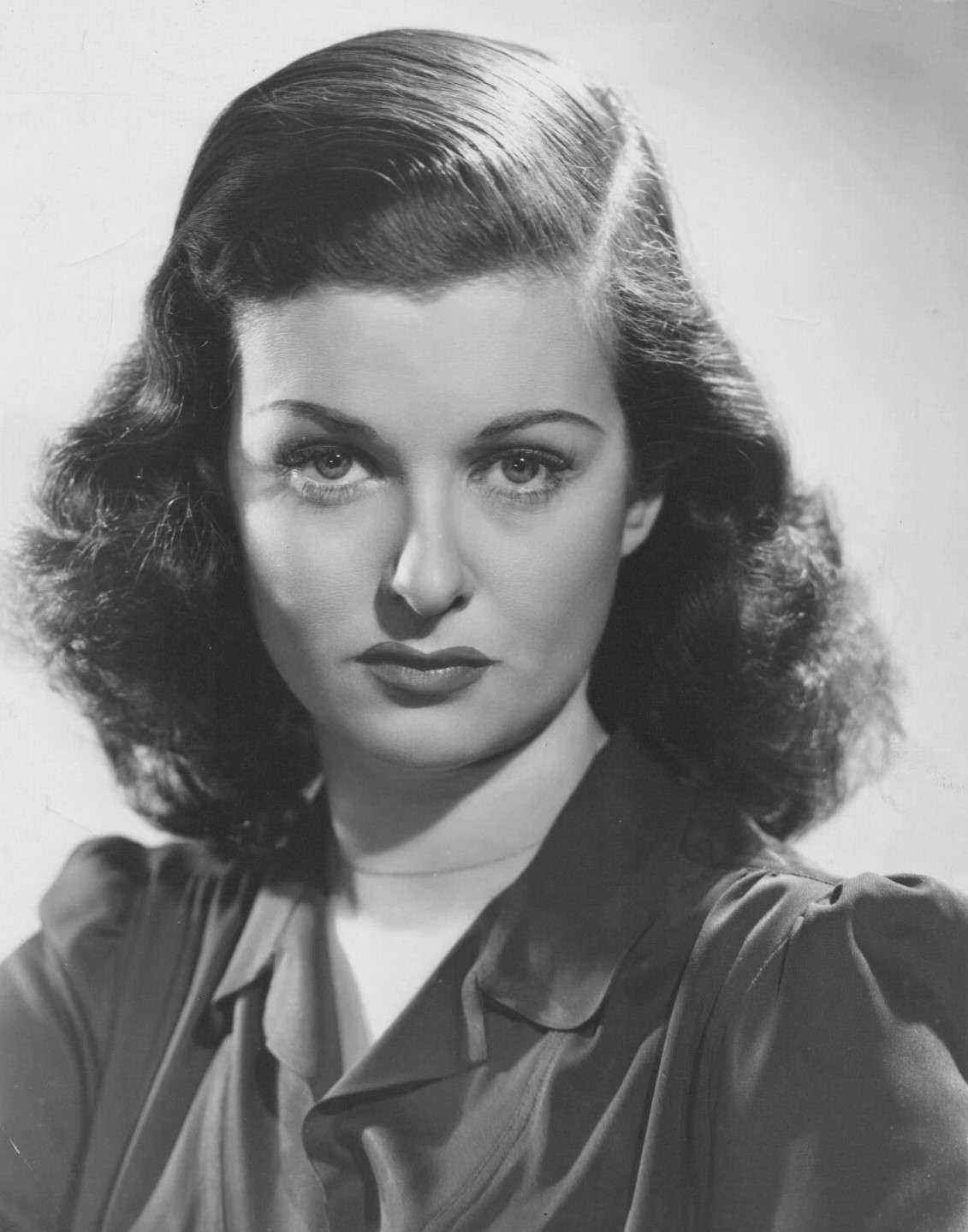
- c. 1944
- Born: Joan Geraldine Bennett; February 27, 1910; Fort Lee, New Jersey, U.S.
- Died: December 7, 1990 (aged 80); Scarsdale, New York, U.S.
- Resting place: Pleasant View Cemetery, Lyme, Connecticut, U.S.
- Occupation: Actress
- Years active: 1916–1982
- Spouses: John Marion Fox (m. 1926; div. 1928) Gene Markey (m. 1932; div. 1937) Walter Wanger (m. 1940; div. 1965) David Wilde (m. 1978)
- Children: 4
- Parent(s): Richard Bennett; Adrienne Morrison
- Relatives: Lewis Morrison (grandfather); Constance Bennett (sister); Barbara Bennett (sister); Lorinda Roland (niece); Morton Downey Jr. (nephew)

Joan Geraldine Bennett (February 27, 1910 – December 7, 1990) was an American stage, film, and television actress, one of three acting sisters from a show-business family. Beginning her career on the stage, Bennett appeared in more than 70 films from the era of silent films, well into the sound era. She is best remembered for her film noir femme fatale roles in director Fritz Lang's films, including Man Hunt (1941), The Woman in the Window (1944), and Scarlet Street (1945), and for her television role as matriarch Elizabeth Collins Stoddard (and ancestors Naomi Collins, Judith Collins Trask, and Flora Collins in various timelines) in the gothic 1960s soap opera Dark Shadows, for which she was nominated for an Emmy Award for Outstanding Achievement in Daytime Programming at the 20th Primetime Emmy Awards in 1968.

Bennett's career had three distinct phases: First, she was a winsome blonde ingenue, then was a sensuous brunette femme fatale (with looks that movie magazines often compared to those of Hedy Lamarr), and finally, she w as a warmhearted wife-and-mother figure.

In 1951, Bennett's screen career was marred by scandal after her third husband, film producer Walter Wanger, shot and injured her agent Jennings Lang. Wanger suspected that Lang and she were having an affair, a charge that she denied adamantly. She married four times.

For her final film role, as Madame Blanc in Dario Argento's cult horror film Suspiria (1977), she was nominated for the Saturn Award for Best Supporting Actress at the 5th Saturn Awards.

== Early life and family ==
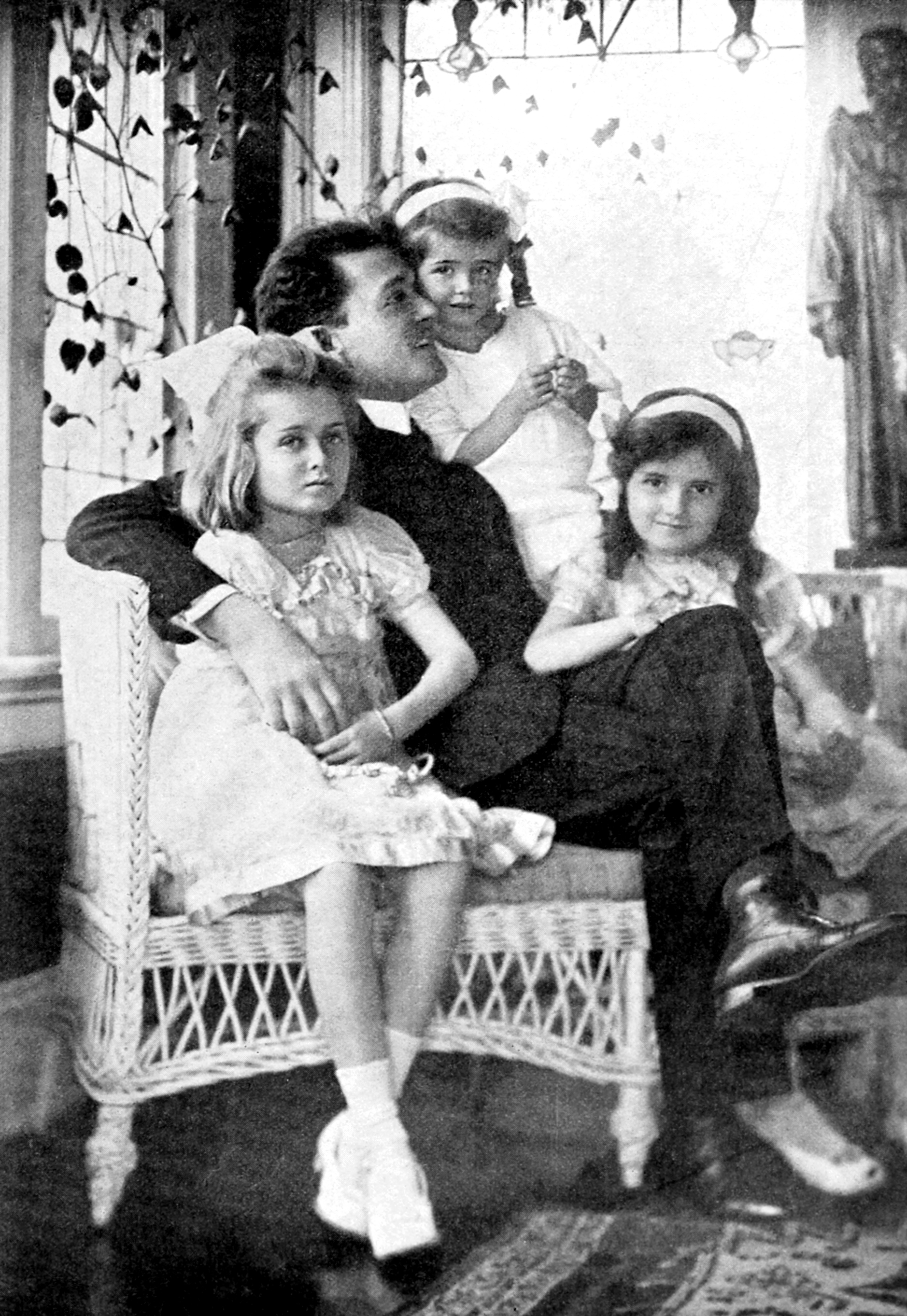
Richard Bennett with his three daughters (from left), Constance, Joan, and Barbara (c. 1913)

Joan Geraldine Bennett was born in the Palisade section of Fort Lee, New Jersey, on February 27, 1910, the youngest of three daughters of actor Richard Bennett and actress and literary agent Adrienne Morrison. Joan's parents had expected her to be a boy and had agreed on the name John, after her father's character John Shand in his hit play What Every Woman Knows with actress Maude Adams. She later said, "I guess I was forgiven for emerging as a female, since father declared later I was 'a rosebud blooming in the sun and it was love at first sight.' As for my name, Maude Adams's Scottish-accented pronunciation of 'John' was very close to 'Joan' and the matter was settled in that way." She was given the middle name Geraldine after the Bennetts' lawyer, Gerald Stalter.

Her elder sisters were actress Constance Bennett, who was the mother of sculptor Lorinda Roland, and actress and dancer Barbara Bennett, who was the first wife of singer Morton Downey and the mother of Morton Downey Jr..

Bennett's father was the first member of his family to become a professional actor. Her paternal ancestors, the Bennetts, were sawmill operators. According to Joan, her great-great-grandfather Moses Bennett started the family tradition of becoming a preacher: "He became one of the class of unordained, lay preachers known as community circuit riders, who traveled the surrounding country on horseback, and without fee, preached for the glory of God and the salvation of men." She believed acting came naturally to her father because "the Bennetts were powerful speakers and given to histrionics in the pulpit", noting that "a good preacher also had to be a good actor."

On her mother's side, Bennett was the fifth generation of a family of actors. The first actor in her family was her great-great-grandfather William Wodin (b. c. 1770), a Welshman who moved to London, changed his surname to Wood, and became a strolling player. His son, William F. Wood (b. 1799), Bennett's great-grandfather, specialized in pantomime. The younger William married a Scottish dancer named Sarah Campbell, a descendant of the Duke of Argyll. William, Sarah, and their two sons relocated to New York in 1838. Their daughter, Rosabel "Rose" Wood (b. 1845), Bennett's maternal grandmother, became an actress and dancer. In 1865, Rose married Jamaica-born actor Lewis Morrison, Bennett's maternal grandfather, the son of an English planter and a woman of Spanish descent. The Morrisons acted in Shakespearean plays, Restoration comedies, and popular dramas of the time.

Bennett first appeared in a silent film as a child with her parents, sisters, and aunt Blanche in her father's drama The Valley of Decision (1916), which he adapted and directed for the screen. It was filmed in Santa Barbara, California, and her sisters and she portrayed "unborn souls" in the film's prelude. She attended Miss Hopkins School for Girls in Manhattan, then St. Margaret's, a boarding school in Waterbury, Connecticut, and L'Hermitage, a finishing school in Versailles, France.

== Career ==
=== Blonde roles ===
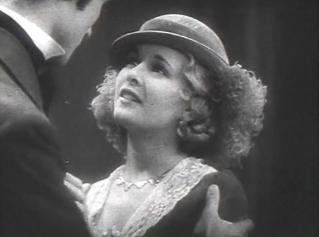
Bennett in the trailer for Disraeli (1929)

Bennett's stage debut was at age 18, acting with her father in Jarnegan (1928), which ran on Broadway for 136 performances and for which she received good reviews. By the time she turned 20 she had become a movie star through such roles as Phyllis Benton in Bulldog Drummond starring Ronald Colman, which was her first important role, and Lady Clarissa Pevensey opposite George Arliss in Disraeli (both 1929).

She moved quickly from movie to movie throughout the 1930s. Bennett appeared as a blonde (her natural hair color) for several years. She starred in the role of Dolores Fenton in the United Artists musical Puttin' on the Ritz (1930) opposite Harry Richman and as Faith Mapple, Captain Ahab Ceely's beloved, opposite John Barrymore in an early sound version of Moby-Dick (1930) at Warner Bros.

Under contract to Fox Film Corporation, she appeared in several movies. She played the role of Jane Miller opposite Spencer Tracy in She Wanted a Millionaire (1932), receiving top billing. She was billed second, after Tracy, for her role as Helen Riley, a personable waitress who trades wisecracks, in Me and My Gal (1932).

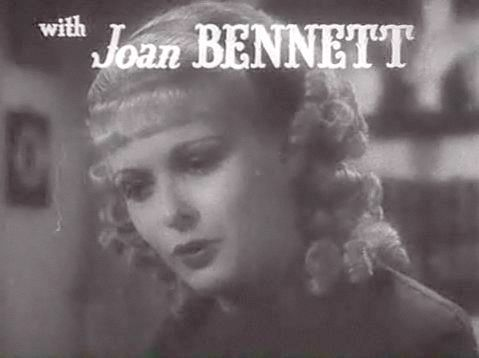
Bennett in the trailer for Little Women (1933)

Bennett left Fox to play Amy March, a pert sister competing with Katharine Hepburn's Jo in Little Women (1933), which was directed by George Cukor for RKO. This movie brought Bennett to the attention of independent film producer Walter Wanger, who signed her to a contract and began managing her career. She played the role of Sally MacGregor, a psychiatrist's young wife slipping into insanity, in Private Worlds (1935) with Joel McCrea, who played her husband Dr. Alex MacGregor. Bennett starred in the film Vogues of 1938 (1937), including the title sequence, in which she donned a diamond-and-platinum bracelet set with the Star of Burma ruby. Wanger and director Tay Garnett persuaded her to change her hair from blonde to brunette as part of the plot for her role as Kay Kerrigan in the scenic Trade Winds (1938) opposite Fredric March.

=== Brunette roles ===
With her change in appearance, Bennett began an entirely new screen career as her persona evolved into that of a glamorous, seductive femme fatale. She played the role of Princess Maria Theresa in The Man in the Iron Mask (1939), opposite Louis Hayward, and the role of the Grand Duchess Zona of Lichtenburg in The Son of Monte Cristo (1940), opposite Hayward.

During his search for an actress to play Scarlett O'Hara in Gone with the Wind, producer David O. Selznick asked Bennett if she could make a screen test. She agreed because Scarlett was "such a plum role". She worked on her Southern accent for several weeks with dialogue director Bill Price. Bennett's test consisted of three scenes, and she impressed Selznick to such an extent that she became one of the four actresses who were tested in color, along with Jean Arthur, Paulette Goddard, and Vivien Leigh. According to Bennett, Leigh and she were Selznick's last two choices, but he sent her a letter that read, "The Scarlett hour has arrived; and the decision, unfortunately, is against our Joanie. I am more grateful than I can say for your effort, which was magnificent."

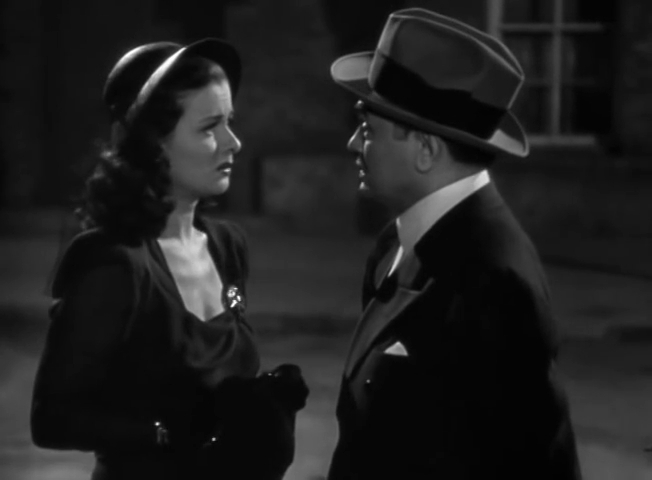
Bennett and Edward G. Robinson in The Woman in the Window (1944)

Combined with her sultry eyes and husky voice, Bennett's new brunette look gave her an earthier, more arresting persona. She won praise for her performances as Brenda Bentley in The House Across the Bay (1940), also featuring George Raft, and as Carol Hoffman in the anti-Nazi drama The Man I Married, a film in which Francis Lederer also starred.

Bennett's first film for Fritz Lang was the 20th Century-Fox production Man Hunt (1941), co-starring Walter Pidgeon. She considered Lang "the incomparable director" and described Man Hunt as "a circumstance that would be an important boost for me as an actress." She was cast as a Cockney woman named Jerry Stokes, and for weeks before filming began, she practiced her accent with English actress Queenie Leonard. Bennett later said, "It was the only movie I ever made in which I knew the entire script, like a play, beforehand." In her autobiography, she wrote about her working relationship with Lang:

Fritz was terribly exacting and demanding and working with him was sometimes abrasive, but he commanded great respect, and I performed better under his direction than at any other time in my career. Almost always I did what I was told, and we developed a great working rapport.

Bennett was Henry Fonda's leading lady in Wild Geese Calling (1941). Lang was going to direct Bennett again in the 20th Century-Fox film Confirm or Deny (1941), but he quarreled with the studio heads and walked out after one week of filming. She played the female leads in three comedies released in 1942: The Wife Takes a Flyer, with Franchot Tone; Twin Beds, with George Brent; and Girl Trouble, with Don Ameche. Otto Preminger directed her in the drama Margin for Error (1943).

Bennett replaced Merle Oberon in the title role of Fritz Lang's film noir The Woman in the Window (1944), co-starring Edward G. Robinson and featuring Dan Duryea. It was her second film with Lang, and she later remembered, "Its success equaled that of Man Hunt, and ours seemed a most fortuitous working relationship. Bennett also accepted the role Oberon left vacant in the Technicolor musical Nob Hill (1945), co-starring George Raft. She told Louella Parsons, "It looks as if I am inheriting all Merle Oberon's cast offs. First, The Woman in the Window, and now Nob Hill."

Walter Wanger, Fritz Lang, and Bennett formed an independent production company named Diana Productions. Their first film was Scarlet Street (1945), Bennett's second film with Robinson and Duryea. It was another box-office hit. There were plans for a third Robinson-Bennett film, Mauve Decade, but it was never made.

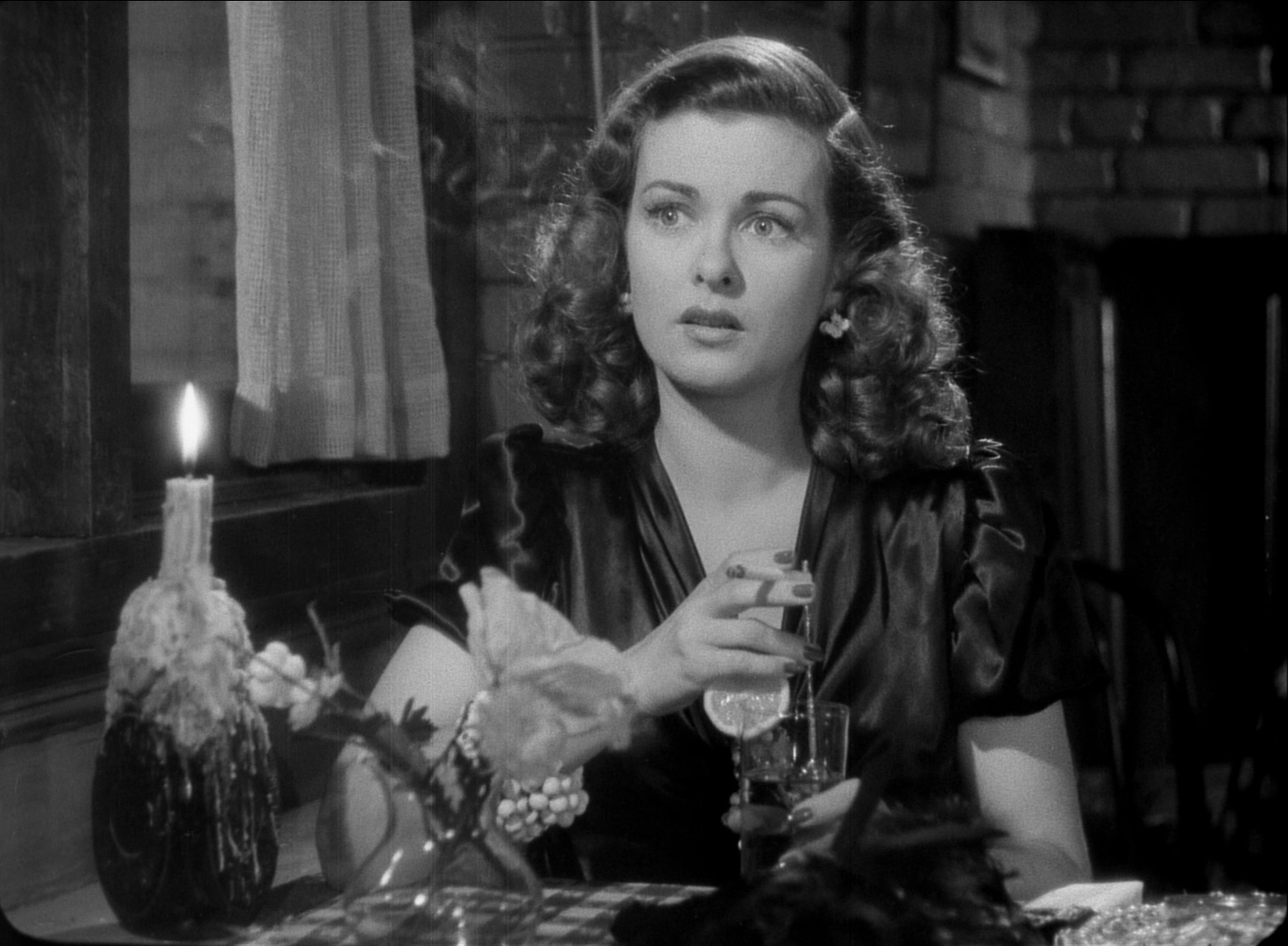
Bennett in Scarlet Street (1945)

Bennett was the shrewish, cuckolding wife, Margaret Macomber, in Zoltan Korda's The Macomber Affair (1947) opposite Gregory Peck, as deceitful wife Peggy Butler, in Jean Renoir's The Woman on the Beach (also 1947) opposite Robert Ryan and Charles Bickford, and as tormented Lucia Harper in Max Ophüls' The Reckless Moment (1949) as the victim of Martin Donnelly, a blackmailer played by James Mason. Then, easily shifting images again, she changed her screen persona to that of an elegant, witty, and nurturing wife and mother in two comedies directed by Vincente Minnelli. Playing the role of Ellie Banks, the wife of Stanley Banks (Spencer Tracy) and mother of Kay Banks (Elizabeth Taylor), Bennett appeared in both Father of the Bride (1950) and Father's Little Dividend (1951).

Bennett made a number of radio appearances from the 1930s to the 1950s, performing on such programs as The Edgar Bergen and Charlie McCarthy Show, Duffy's Tavern, The Jack Benny Program, Ford Theater, Suspense, and the anthology series Lux Radio Theater and Screen Guild Theater.

With the increasing popularity of television, Bennett made five guest appearances in 1951, including an episode of Sid Caesar and Imogene Coca's Your Show of Shows. A restored kinescope of her April 26, 1951, appearance on episode four of James Melton's Ford Festival TV show (alongside Victor Borge and Dorothy Warenskjold) is viewable online.

=== Blacklisting ===
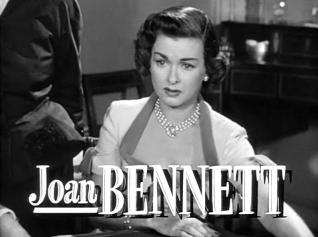
Bennett in the trailer for Father's Little Dividend (1951)

Bennett made only five movies in the decade that followed the 1951 shooting incident, and only two films in the 1970s, for the incident was a stain on her career, and she became virtually blacklisted. Blaming the scandal that occurred for destroying her career in the motion picture industry, Bennett once said, "I might as well have pulled the trigger myself." Although Humphrey Bogart, a longtime friend, pleaded with Paramount Pictures on her behalf to keep her after her role as Amelie Ducotel in We're No Angels (1955).

As the movie offers dwindled after the scandal, Bennett continued touring in stage successes, such as Susan and God, Once More, with Feeling, The Pleasure of His Company, and Never Too Late. Her next TV appearance was in the role of Bettina Blane in "You Are Only Young Once", an episode of General Electric Theater in 1954. Her other roles included Honora in Climax! (1955) and Vickie Maxwell in Playhouse 90 (1957). In 1958, she appeared as Mary Blake, the mother to teenagers Pam (Brigid Bazlen) and Johnny (Martin Huston) in the short-lived television comedy/drama Too Young to Go Steady. She starred on Broadway in the comedy Love Me Little (1958), which ran for only eight performances.

Of the scandal, in a 1981 interview, Bennett contrasted the judgmental 1950s with the sensation-crazed 1970s and 1980s. "It would never happen that way today," she said, laughing. "If it happened today, I'd be a sensation. I'd be wanted by all studios for all pictures."

=== TV and final roles ===
Despite the shooting scandal and the damage it caused Bennett's film career, Wanger and she remained married until 1965. She continued to work steadily on the stage and in television, including a guest role as Denise Mitchell in "Who Killed Mr. Colby in Ladies' Lingerie?", an episode of TV's Burke's Law (1965).

Bennett in the TV series Dark Shadows

Bennett received star billing in the gothic soap opera Dark Shadows for its entire five-year run, 1966 to 1971, receiving an Emmy Award nomination for Outstanding Achievement in Daytime Programming at the 20th Primetime Emmy Awards in 1968 for her performance as Elizabeth Collins Stoddard, mistress of the haunted Collinwood Mansion. Her other roles in Dark Shadows were Naomi Collins, Judith Collins Trask, Elizabeth Collins Stoddard PT (parallel time, as the show described its alternate reality), Flora Collins, and Flora Collins PT. In 1970, she appeared as Elizabeth in House of Dark Shadows, the feature-film adaptation of the series. However, she declined to appear in the sequel Night of Dark Shadows, and her character Elizabeth was mentioned therein as being recently deceased.

Her other TV guest appearances include roles as Joan Darlene Delaney in 'Check the Check", an episode of The Governor & J.J. (1970) and as Edith in "Love and the Second Time", an episode of Love, American Style (1971). She starred in five made-for-TV movies between 1972 and 1982.

Bennett also appeared in one more feature film, as Madame Blanc in director Dario Argento's horror film Suspiria (1977), for which she received a 1978 Saturn Award nomination for Best Supporting Actress.

== Personal life ==
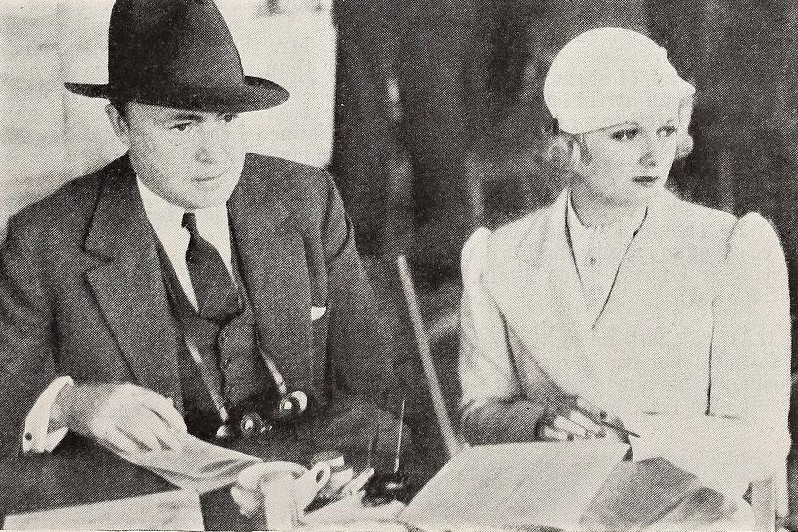
Joan Bennett with her second husband, Gene Markey, in 1933

On September 15, 1926, 16-year-old Bennett married John M. Fox in London. They divorced in Los Angeles on July 30, 1928, based on charges of his alcoholism. They had one child, Adrienne Ralston Fox (born February 20, 1928), for whom Bennett fought successfully in court to rename Diana Bennett Markey when the child was eight years old (she had married Gene Markey in 1932), and the child's name was changed to Diana Bennett Wanger in 1944 after her mother married Walter Wanger in 1940.

On March 16, 1932, she married screenwriter/film producer Gene Markey in Los Angeles, but the couple divorced in Los Angeles on June 3, 1937. They had one child, Melinda Markey (born February 27, 1934, on Bennett's 24th birthday).

On January 12, 1940, Bennett and producer Walter Wanger were married in Phoenix, Arizona. They were divorced in September 1965 in Mexico. The couple had two children together, Stephanie Wanger (born June 26, 1943) and Shelley Wanger (born July 4, 1948). The following year, on March 13, 1949, Bennett became a grandmother at age 39.

=== Scandal ===
For 12 years, Bennett was represented by agent Jennings Lang, the onetime vice president of the Sam Jaffe Agency, who then headed MCA's West Coast television operations. Lang and she met on the afternoon of December 13, 1951, to talk over an upcoming TV show.

Bennett parked her Cadillac convertible in the lot at the back of the MCA offices, at Santa Monica Boulevard and Rexford Drive, across the street from the Beverly Hills Police Department, and Lang and she drove off in his car. Meanwhile, her husband Walter Wanger drove past about 2:30 pm and noticed his wife's car parked there. Half an hour later, he again saw her car there and stopped to wait. Bennett and Lang drove into the parking lot a few hours later, and he walked her to her convertible. As she started the engine, turned on the headlights, and prepared to drive away, Lang leaned on the car, with both hands raised to his shoulders, and talked to her.

In a fit of jealousy, Wanger walked up and twice shot and wounded the unsuspecting agent. One bullet hit Jennings in the right thigh, near the hip, and the other penetrated his groin. Bennett said she did not see Wanger at first. She said she suddenly saw two vivid flashes, then Lang slumped to the ground. As soon as she recognized who had fired the shots, she told Wanger, "Get away and leave us alone." He tossed the pistol into his wife's car.

The parking lot's service-station manager and she took Lang to the agent's doctor. He was then taken to a hospital, where he recovered. The police station was located across the lot, officers had heard the shots, and came to the scene and found the gun in Bennett's car when they took Wanger into custody. Wanger was booked and fingerprinted, and underwent lengthy questioning.

"I shot him because I thought he was breaking up my home," Wanger told Clinton Anderson, the police chief of Beverly Hills. He was booked on suspicion of assault with intent to commit murder. Bennett denied a romance. "But if Walter thinks the relationships between Mr. Lang and myself are romantic or anything but strictly business, he is wrong," she declared. She blamed the trouble on financial setbacks involving film productions Wanger was involved with, and said he was on the verge of a nervous breakdown. The following day, Wanger, out on bond, returned to their Holmby Hills home, collected his belongings, and moved out. Bennett, however, said there would not be a divorce.

On December 14, Bennett issued a statement in which she said she hoped her husband "will not be blamed too much" for wounding her agent. She read the prepared statement in the bedroom of her home to a group of newspapermen while TV cameras recorded the scene.

Wanger's attorney, Jerry Giesler, mounted a "temporary insanity" defense. He then decided to waive his right to a jury, and threw himself on the mercy of the court. Wanger served a four-month sentence in the County Honor Farm at Castaic, California, 39 miles north of downtown Los Angeles, quickly returning to his career to make a series of successful films.

Meanwhile, Bennett went to Chicago to appear on the stage in the role as the young witch Gillian Holroyd in [Bell, Book and Candle , then went on national tour with the production.

=== Political views ===
She was a very active member of both the Hollywood Democratic Committee and the Hollywood Anti-Nazi League and donated her time and money to many liberal causes (such as the civil rights movement) and political candidates (including Franklin D. Roosevelt, Henry A. Wallace, Adlai Stevenson II, John F. Kennedy, Robert F. Kennedy, and Jimmy Carter) during her lifetime.

=== Later years and death ===
Bennett's autobiography The Bennett Playbill, written with Lois Kibbee, was published in 1970.

Bennett and retired publisher/movie critic David Wilde were married on February 14, 1978, 13 days before her 68th birthday, in White Plains, New York. Their marriage lasted until her death in 1990.

Celebrated for not taking herself too seriously, Bennett said in a 1986 interview, "I don't think much of most of the films I made, but being a movie star was something I liked very much."

Bennett died of heart failure on Friday evening, December 7, 1990, aged 80, at her home in Scarsdale, New York.

== Awards and honors ==
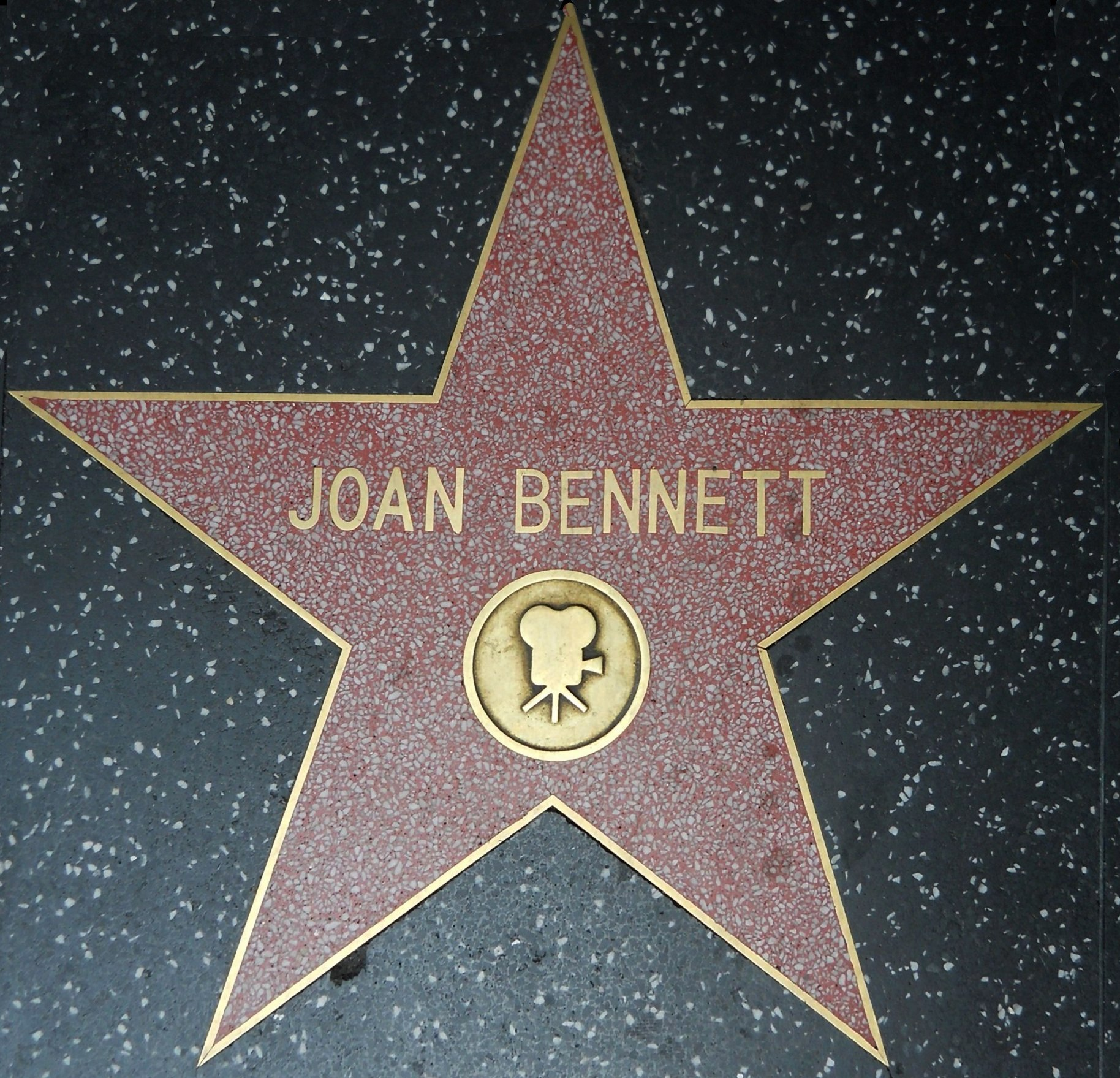
Bennett's star on the Hollywood Walk of Fame at 6300 Hollywood Blvd

- 4th best-dressed Hollywood actress of 1936 in a Screen & Radio Weekly poll
- 1937 plaque from the Professional Dress Models Association for giving "new dignity to the modeling profession by appearing in" the film Vogues of 1938
- 1939 nomination for the d'Orsay Gold Medal for Hollywood's best groomed woman
- 1981 Westchester Community College's Communications and Media Arts Award
- 1983 National Mother's Day Committee's Outstanding Mother Award
- 1983 National Film Society's Artistry in Cinema Award
- Bennett has a motion pictures star on the Hollywood Walk of Fame for her contributions to the film industry. Her star is located at 6300 Hollywood Boulevard, a short distance from the star of her sister Constance.

== Filmography ==
Bennett appeared in many movies and television productions, listed below in their entirety.

=== Film ===
Year	Title	Role	Notes
1916	The Valley of Decision	unborn soul	
1923	The Eternal City	Page	uncredited
1928	Power	a dame	
1929	The Divine Lady	extra	uncredited
1929	Bulldog Drummond	Phyllis Benton	
1929	Three Live Ghosts	Rose Gordon	
1929	Disraeli	Lady Clarissa Pevensey	
1929	The Mississippi Gambler	Lucy Blackburn	
1930	Puttin' On the Ritz	Delores Fenton	
1930	Crazy That Way	Ann Jordan	
1930	Moby Dick	Faith Mapple	
1930	Maybe It's Love (a.k.a. Eleven Men and a Girl)	Nan Sheffield	
1930	Scotland Yard	Lady Xandra Lasher	
1931	Many a Slip	Pat Coster	
1931	Doctors' Wives	Nina Wyndram	
1931	Hush Money	Joan Gordon	
1932	She Wanted a Millionaire	Jane Miller	
1932	Careless Lady	Sally Brown	
1932	The Trial of Vivienne Ware	Vivienne Ware	
1932	Week Ends Only	Venetia Carr	
1932	Wild Girl	Salomy Jane	
1932	Me and My Gal	Helen Riley	
1933	Arizona to Broadway	Lynn Martin	
1933	Little Women	Amy March	
1934	The Pursuit of Happiness	Prudence Kirkland	
1934	The Man Who Reclaimed His Head	Adele Verin	
1935	Private Worlds	Sally MacGregor	
1935	Mississippi	Lucy Rumford	
1935	Two for Tonight	Bobbie Lockwood	
1935	She Couldn't Take It	Carol Van Dyke	
1935	The Man Who Broke the Bank at Monte Carlo	Helen Berkeley	
1936	Big Brown Eyes	Eve Fallon	
1936	Thirteen Hours by Air	Felice Rollins	
1936	Two in a Crowd	Julia Wayne	
1936	Wedding Present	Monica "Rusty" Fleming	
1937	Vogues of 1938	Wendy Van Klettering	
1938	I Met My Love Again	Julie Weir Shaw	
1938	The Texans	Ivy Preston	
1938	Artists and Models Abroad	Patricia Harper	
1938	Trade Winds	Kay Kerrigan	
1939	The Man in the Iron Mask	Princess Maria Theresa	
1939	The Housekeeper's Daughter	Hilda Kreemhild	
1940	Green Hell	Stephanie Richardson	
1940	The House Across the Bay	Brenda Bentley	
1940	The Man I Married	Carol Hoffman	
1940	The Son of Monte Cristo	Grand Duchess Zona of Lichtenburg	
1941	She Knew All the Answers	Gloria Winters	
1941	Man Hunt	Jerry Stokes	
1941	Wild Geese Calling	Sally Murdock	
1941	Confirm or Deny	Jennifer Carson	
1942	The Wife Takes a Flyer	Anita Woverman	
1942	Twin Beds	Julie Abbott	
1942	Girl Trouble	June Delaney	
1943	Margin for Error	Sophia Baumer	
1944	The Woman in the Window	Alice Reed	
1945	Nob Hill	Harriet Carruthers	
1945	Scarlet Street	Katharine "Kitty" March	
1946	Colonel Effingham's Raid	Ella Sue Dozier	
1947	The Macomber Affair	Margaret Macomber	
1947	The Woman on the Beach	Peggy Butler	
1947	Secret Beyond the Door...	Celia Lamphere	
1948	Hollow Triumph (aka The Scar)	Evelyn Hahn	
1949	The Reckless Moment	Lucia Harper	
1950	Father of the Bride	Ellie Banks	
1950	For Heaven's Sake	Lydia Bolton	
1951	Father's Little Dividend	Ellie Banks	
1951	The Guy Who Came Back	Kathy Joplin	
1954	Highway Dragnet	Mrs. Cummings	
1955	We're No Angels	Amelie Ducotel	
1956	There's Always Tomorrow	Marion Groves	
1956	Navy Wife	Peg Blain	
1960	Desire in the Dust	Mrs. Marquand	
1970	House of Dark Shadows	Elizabeth Collins Stoddard	
1972	Gidget Gets Married	Claire Ramsey	ABC Movie of the Week
1972	The Eyes of Charles Sand	Aunt Alexandria Sand	ABC Movie of the Week
1977	Suspiria	Madame Blanc	

=== Television ===
- The Nash Airflyte Theater (1951) episode: Peggy
- Your Show of Shows (1951) 1 episode
- Danger (1951) episode: A Clear Case of Suicide
- Somerset Maugham TV Theatre (1951) episode: Smith Serves
- Somerset Maugham TV Theatre (1951) episode: The Dream
- General Electric Theater (1954) episode: You Are Young Only Once, as Bettina Blane
- The Best of Broadway (1954) episode: The Man Who Came to Dinner, as Lorraine Sheldon
- Climax! (1955) episode: The Dark Fleece, as Honora
- The Ford Television Theatre (1955) episode: Letters Marked Personal, as Marcia Manners
- The Ford Television Theatre (1956) episode: Dear Diane, as Marion
- Playhouse 90 (1957) episode: The Thundering Wave, as Vickie Maxwell
- The DuPont Show of the Month (1957) episode: Junior Miss, as Grace Graves
- Pursuit (1958) episode: Epitaph for a Golden Girl
- Too Young to Go Steady (1959) (own series), as Mary Blake
- Burke's Law (1965) episode: Who Killed Mr. Colby in Ladies' Lingerie?, as Denise Mitchell
- Dark Shadows (1966–1971) (series regular, 386 episodes), as Elizabeth Collins Stoddard / Naomi Collins / Judith Collins Trask / Flora Collins / Flora Collins (PT) / Elizabeth Collins Stoddard (PT)
- The Governor & J.J. (1970) episode: Check the Check, as Joan Darlene Delaney
- Love, American Style (1971) episode segment: Love and the Second Time, as Edith
- Dr. Simon Locke (1972) episode: The Cortessa Rose, as Cortessa

=== Made-for-TV movies ===
- Gidget Gets Married (1972) as Claire Ramsey
- The Eyes of Charles Sand (1972) as Aunt Alexandra
- Suddenly, Love (1978) as Mrs. Graham
- This House Possessed (1981) as Rag Lady
- Divorce Wars: A Love Story (1982) as Adele Burgess

=== As herself ===
- Screen Actors (1950) (uncredited)
- The Colgate Comedy Hour (1951) 1 episode
- What's My Line? (1951) 1 episode
- The Ken Murray Show (1951) 1 episode
- Ford Festival (1951)
- I've Got A Secret (1953)
- Climax! (1956) episode: The Louella Parsons Story
- To Tell the Truth (1958) 1 episode
- The Mike Douglas Show (1964, 1967, 1970, 1970, 1977) 5 episodes
- The Merv Griffin Show (1967) 1 episode
- Personality (1968) 1 episode
- The Hollywood Squares (1970) 1 episode
- The Virginia Graham Show (1970) 1 episode
- The Hollywood Greats (1977) 2 episodes: Humphrey Bogart; Spencer Tracy
- The Guiding Light (1982) 1 episode
- The Spencer Tracy Legacy: A Tribute by Katharine Hepburn (1986)

=== Short subject ===
- Screen Snapshots (1932)
- Hollywood on Parade No. A-12 (1933)
- The Fashion Side of Hollywood (1935)
- Hollywood Party (1937)
- Screen Snapshots Series 19, No. 9: Sports in Hollywood (1940)
- Hedda Hopper's Hollywood, No. 6 (1942)
- Screen Actors (1950) (uncredited)

=== Radio appearances ===
Year	Program	Episode/source
1941	Philip Morris Playhouse	Girl in the News
1946	Screen Guild Players	Experiment Perilous
1947	Suspense	"Overture in Two Keys"
