= Otto Meyer (film editor) =

American film editor

- Born: July 12, 1901; San Francisco, California, United States
- Died: April 18, 1980 (aged 78); California, United States
- Occupation: Film editor

Otto Meyer (1901–1980) was an American film editor.

Meyer was born in San Francisco, began working as a film editor in 1931, and edited about 80 films and television shows through the 1960s. He was nominated for the Academy Award for Best Film Editing twice, once for Theodora Goes Wild in 1936, and The Talk of the Town in 1942.

== Filmography ==
Editor
Year	Film	Director	Notes	Other notes
1931	Branded	D. Ross Lederman	First collaboration with D. Ross Lederman	
1931	Border Law	Louis King		
1931	The One Way Trail	Ray Taylor		
1931	The Fighting Marshal	D. Ross Lederman	Second collaboration with D. Ross Lederman	
1932	The Fighting Fool	Lambert Hillyer	First collaboration with Lambert Hillyer	
1932	Texas Cyclone	D. Ross Lederman	Third collaboration with D. Ross Lederman	
1932	The Riding Tornado	D. Ross Lederman	Fourth collaboration with D. Ross Lederman	
1932	Two-Fisted Law	D. Ross Lederman	Fifth collaboration with D. Ross Lederman	
1932	Daring Danger	D. Ross Lederman	Sixth collaboration with D. Ross Lederman	
1932	Cornered	B. Reeves Eason		
1932	Fighting for Justice	Otto Brower	First collaboration with Otto Brower	
1932	The Western Code	John P. McCarthy		
1932	End of the Trail	D. Ross Lederman	Seventh collaboration with D. Ross Lederman	
1933	Man of Action	George Melford		
1933	Treason	George B. Seitz		
1933	Silent Men	D. Ross Lederman	Eighth collaboration with D. Ross Lederman	
1933	The Whirlwind	D. Ross Lederman	Ninth collaboration with D. Ross Lederman	
1933	Damaged Lives	Edgar G. Ulmer		
1933	Rusty Rides Alone	D. Ross Lederman	Tenth collaboration with D. Ross Lederman	
1933	Police Car 17	Lambert Hillyer	Second collaboration with Lambert Hillyer	
1933	Hold the Press	Phil Rosen		
1933	Before Midnight	Lambert Hillyer	Third collaboration with Lambert Hillyer	
1933	Straightaway	Otto Brower	Second collaboration with Otto Brower	
1934	The Crime of Helen Stanley	D. Ross Lederman	Eleventh collaboration with D. Ross Lederman	
1934	Hell Bent for Love	D. Ross Lederman	Twelfth collaboration with D. Ross Lederman	
1934	A Man's Game	D. Ross Lederman	Thirteenth collaboration with D. Ross Lederman	
1934	Beyond the Law	D. Ross Lederman	Fourteenth collaboration with D. Ross Lederman	
1934	Girl in Danger	D. Ross Lederman	Fifteenth collaboration with D. Ross Lederman	
1934	Against the Law	Lambert Hillyer	Fourth collaboration with Lambert Hillyer	
1934	White Lies	Leo Bulgakov	First collaboration with Leo Bulgakov	
1935	The Best Man Wins	Erle C. Kenton	First collaboration with Erle C. Kenton	
1935	In Spite of Danger	Lambert Hillyer	Fifth collaboration with Lambert Hillyer	
1935	After the Dance	Leo Bulgakov	Second collaboration with Leo Bulgakov	
1935	Escape from Devil's Island	Albert S. Rogell	First collaboration with Albert S. Rogell	
1935	Super Speed	Lambert Hillyer	Sixth collaboration with Lambert Hillyer	
1936	Hell-Ship Morgan	D. Ross Lederman	Sixteenth collaboration with D. Ross Lederman	
1936	Roaming Lady	Albert S. Rogell	Second collaboration with Albert S. Rogell	
1936	Meet Nero Wolfe	Herbert Biberman		
1936	Adventure in Manhattan	Edward Ludwig		
1936	Theodora Goes Wild	Richard Boleslawski		
1937	Women of Glamour	Gordon Wiles		
1937	Racketeers in Exile	Erle C. Kenton	Second collaboration with Erle C. Kenton	
1937	The Frame-Up	D. Ross Lederman	Seventeenth collaboration with D. Ross Lederman	
1937	It Happened in Hollywood	Harry Lachman	First collaboration with Harry Lachman	Uncredited
1937	Counsel for Crime	John Brahm	First collaboration with John Brahm	
1937	I'll Take Romance	Edward H. Griffith		
1938	No Time to Marry	Harry Lachman	Second collaboration with Harry Lachman	
1938	The Lone Wolf in Paris	Albert S. Rogell	Third collaboration with Albert S. Rogell	
1938	Holiday	George Cukor		
1938	Girls' School	John Brahm	Second collaboration with John Brahm	
1938	Adventure in Sahara	D. Ross Lederman	Eighteenth collaboration with D. Ross Lederman	
1939	The Lone Wolf Spy Hunt	Peter Godfrey		
1939	The Lady and the Mob	Benjamin Stoloff	Second collaboration with Benjamin Stoloff	
1939	Blind Alley	Charles Vidor	First collaboration with Charles Vidor	
1939	Golden Boy	Rouben Mamoulian		
1939	The Taming of the West	Norman Deming		
1939	Blondie Brings Up Baby	Frank R. Strayer	First collaboration with Frank R. Strayer	
1940	Music in My Heart	Joseph Santley		
1940	Too Many Husbands	Wesley Ruggles	First collaboration with Wesley Ruggles	
1940	Arizona	Wesley Ruggles	Second collaboration with Wesley Ruggles	
1941	Penny Serenade	George Stevens	First collaboration with George Stevens	
1941	You'll Never Get Rich	Sidney Lanfield		
1942	Blondie Goes to College	Frank R. Strayer	Second collaboration with Frank R. Strayer	
1942	The Talk of the Town	George Stevens	Second collaboration with George Stevens	
1943	Something to Shout About	Gregory Ratoff	First collaboration with Gregory Ratoff	
1943	The More the Merrier	George Stevens	Third collaboration with George Stevens	
1943	My Kingdom for a Cook	Richard Wallace		
1943	The Heat's On	Gregory Ratoff	Second collaboration with Gregory Ratoff	
1944	Nine Girls	Leigh Jason		
1944	The Black Parachute	Lew Landers		
1944	Louisiana Hayride	Charles Barton		
1944	Ever Since Venus	Arthur Dreifuss		
1944	Together Again	Charles Vidor	Second collaboration with Charles Vidor	
1945	A Guy, a Gal and a Pal	Budd Boetticher		
1945	Over 21	Charles Vidor	Third collaboration with Charles Vidor	
1945	Song of the Prairie	Ray Nazarro		
1952	And Now Tomorrow	William Watson		
1952	Face to Face	John Brahm; Bretaigne Windust	Third collaboration with John Brahm	
1956	The Tahitian	James Knott		

Editorial department
Year	Film	Director	Role	Notes
1945	Lawless Empire	Vernon Keays	Editorial supervisor	Uncredited
1947	Prairie Raiders	Derwin Abrahams	Supervising film editor	Uncredited

Actor
Year	Film	Director	Role	Notes	Other notes
1920	Sundown Slim	Val Paul	Bud Shoop		
1925	The Gambling Fool	J. P. McGowan	Stringy Hawkins		
1931	Not Exactly Gentlemen	Benjamin Stoloff	Teamster	First collaboration with Benjamin Stoloff	Uncredited
1931	Women of All Nations	Raoul Walsh	Busher		Uncredited

Shorts

Editor
Year	Film	Director
1949	Hello Out There	James Whale

Actor
Year	Film	Director	Role	Notes
1911	The Redemption of Rawhide	William F. Haddock	Alkali Ike	
1911	The Immortal Alamo	William F. Haddock	—	
1912	A Four-Footed Hero	—	Broncho Rider	Uncredited
1914	The Sheriff's Story	—	—	
1914	The Fight in Lonely Gulch	—	—	
1914	A Frontier Romance	—	—	
1919	By Indian Post	John Ford	Swede	
1919	Gun Law	John Ford	Gang Member	

TV pilots

Editor
Year	Film	Director
1958	Cool and Lam	Jacques Tourneur

TV series

Editor
Year	Title	Notes
1954	Mr. and Mrs. North	1 episode
1954−55	The Halls of Ivy	2 episodes
1956	My Friend Flicka	4 episodes
1956	The Count of Monte Cristo	1 episode
1956−57	The 20th Century Fox Hour	12 episodes
1956−58	Broken Arrow	17 episodes
1958	Man Without a Gun	2 episodes
1957−58	How to Marry a Millionaire	4 episodes
1959	The Third Man	3 episodes
1960	Hotel de Paree	1 episode
1960	The Texan	1 episode
1957−61	Perry Mason	22 episodes
1959−67	Gunsmoke	128 episodes
2018	The Forsaken Westerns	1 episode

Editorial department
Year	Title	Role	Notes
1957	How to Marry a Millionaire	Film editor	1 episode
