= Bradley Page =

American actor (1901–1985)

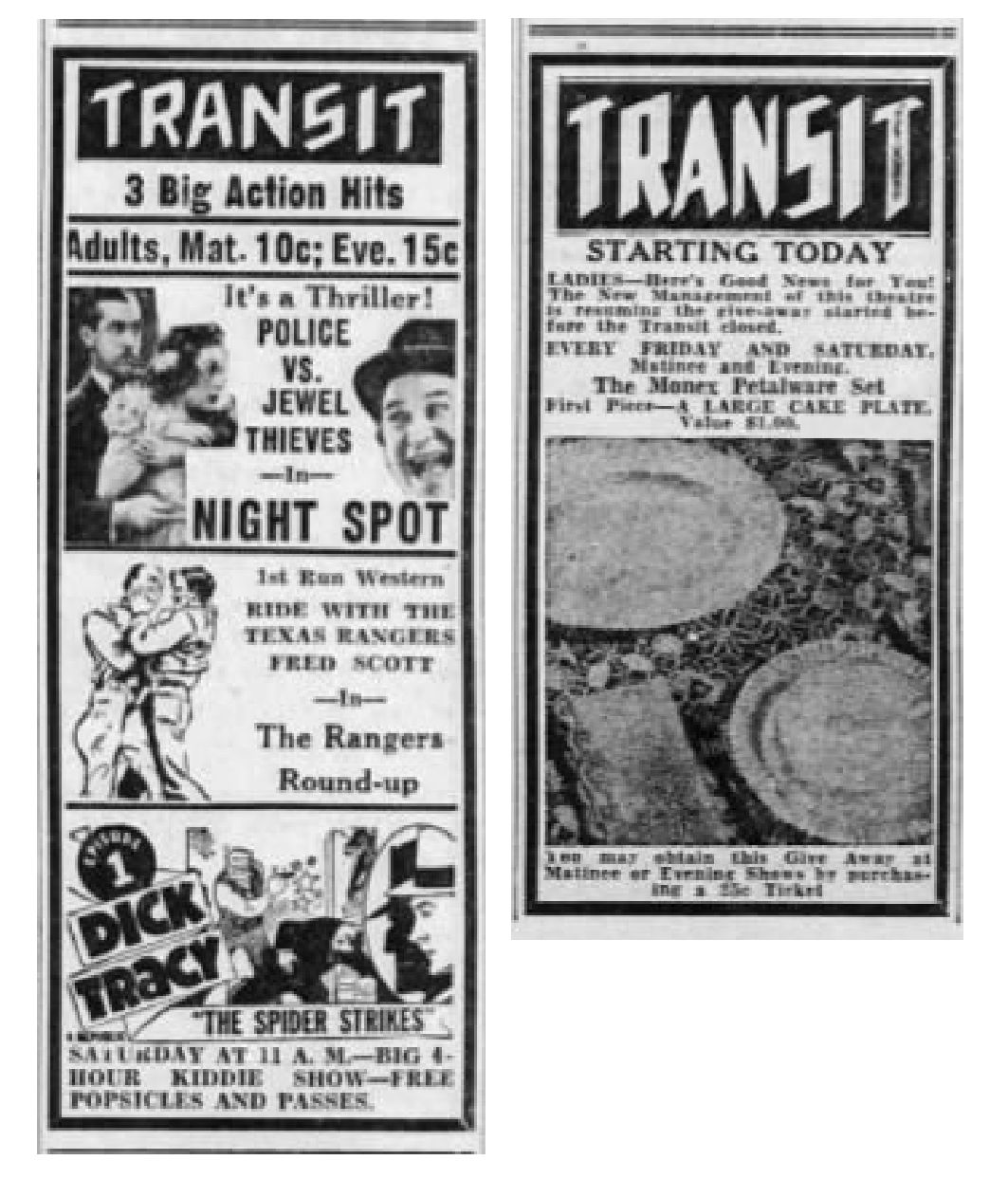
- Bradley Page (upper left) in a newspaper advertisement for Night Spot (1938)
- Born: September 8, 1901; Seattle, Washington, United States
- Died: December 8, 1985 (aged 84); Brookings, Oregon, United States
- Occupation: Actor
- Years active: 1931–1943

Bradley Page (September 8, 1901 – December 8, 1985) was an American film actor. He appeared in more than 100 films from 1931 to 1943.

== Selected filmography ==
- Sporting Blood (1931) - Eddie Frazier (uncredited)
- X Marks the Spot (1931) - District Attorney Harry B. Miles (uncredited)
- The Final Edition (1932) - Sid Malvern
- Love Affair (1932) - Georgie Keeler
- The Wet Parade (1932) - Frankie - Bootlegger (uncredited)
- Attorney for the Defense (1932) - Nick Quinn
- They Call It Sin (1932) - Ford's Nightclub Friend (uncredited)
- Night After Night (1932) - Frankie Guard
- Sundown Rider (1932) - Jim Hunter
- Goldie Gets Along (1933) - Frank Hawthorne
- From Hell to Heaven (1933) - Jack Ruby
- Love Is Dangerous (1933) - Dean Scarsdale
- Central Airport (1933) - Scotty Armstrong (uncredited)
- Hell Below (1933) - Seaman Gardner (uncredited)
- Song of the Eagle (1933) - Los Angeles Racket Boss (uncredited)
- The Life of Jimmy Dolan (1933) - One of Dolan's Backers (uncredited)
- This Day and Age (1933) - Toledo
- Stage Mother (1933) - Tom Banton (uncredited)
- Broken Dreams (1933) - Minor Role (uncredited)
- Hold the Press (1933) - Mike Serrano
- The Chief (1933) - Dapper Dan
- From Headquarters (1933) - Reporter (uncredited)
- Blood Money (1933) - District Attorney (uncredited)
- Before Midnight (1933) - Howard B. Smith
- East of Fifth Avenue (1933) - Nick
- Shadows of Sing Sing (1933) - Slick Hale
- Search for Beauty (1934) - Joe Garrett
- Six of a Kind (1934) - Ferguson
- The Fighting Ranger (1934) - The Cougar
- Good Dame (1934) - Regan
- Looking for Trouble (1934) - George Martin, Associate (uncredited)
- The Crime of Helen Stanley (1934) - George T. Noel
- I Hate Women (1934) - Powell
- He Was Her Man (1934) - Dan 'Danny' Curly
- Hell Bent for Love (1934) - 'Trigger' Talano
- Name the Woman (1934) - Dave Evans
- Once to Every Bachelor (1934) - District Attorney Jerry Landers
- Million Dollar Ransom (1934) - Easy
- Take the Stand (1934) - Ernie Paddock
- Against the Law (1934) - Mike Eagan
- Gentlemen Are Born (1934) - Al Ludlow
- One Hour Late (1934) - Jim (uncredited)
- The Best Man Wins (1935) - Silk (uncredited)
- Red Hot Tires (1935) - Curley Taylor
- Shadow of Doubt (1935) - Len Haworth
- The Nut Farm (1935) - Hamilton T. Holland - Acting School
- The Unwelcome Stranger (1935) - Lucky Palmer
- Baby Face Harrington (1935) - Dave
- Mister Dynamite (1935) - Felix
- The Texas Rambler (1935) - Cabin henchman (uncredited)
- Chinatown Squad (1935) - Claude Palmer
- Champagne for Breakfast (1935) - Wayne Osborne
- Cheers of the Crowd (1935) - Blake Walton
- The Public Menace (1935) - Louie
- Cappy Ricks Returns (1935) - Spencer Winton
- King Solomon of Broadway (1935) - Roth
- Forced Landing (1935) - Steven Greer
- Woman Trap (1936) - Harry Flint
- Three of a Kind (1936) - Rodney Randall
- The Princess Comes Across (1936) - The Stranger
- Two in a Crowd (1936) - Tony Bonelli
- Wedding Present (1936) - Givens (uncredited)
- Ellis Island (1936) - Solo
- Woman-Wise (1937) - Mac (uncredited)
- Don't Tell the Wife (1937) - Hagar - Salesman
- Trouble in Morocco (1937) - Branenok
- Her Husband Lies (1937) - 'Pug, ' Gunman
- The Outcasts of Poker Flat (1937) - Sonoma
- There Goes My Girl (1937) - Joe Rethburn - Nightclub Owner
- Fifty Roads to Town (1937) - Pinelli
- You Can't Beat Love (1937) - Dwight Parsons
- Super-Sleuth (1937) - Ralph Waring
- The Toast of New York (1937) - Vanderbilt Associate (uncredited)
- Hideaway (1937) - Al Miller
- Music for Madame (1937) - Rollins
- Crashing Hollywood (1938) - Thomas 'Tom' Darcy / 'The Hawk'
- Night Spot (1938) - Marty Davis
- Go Chase Yourself (1938) - Frank
- Crime Ring (1938) - Lionel Whitmore
- The Affairs of Annabel (1938) - Howard Webb
- Fugitives for a Night (1938) - Dennis Poole
- Annabel Takes a Tour (1938) - Howard Webb, Chief of Wonder Pictures
- The Law West of Tombstone (1938) - Doc Howard
- Twelve Crowded Hours (1939) - Tom Miller
- Fixer Dugan (1939) - A.J. Barvin, Circus Owner
- Cafe Hostess (1940) - Al
- Enemy Agent (1940) - Francis
- Girl from Havana (1940) - Cort
- Beyond the Sacramento (1940) - Cord Crowley a.k.a. Hank Bradley
- Scattergood Baines (1941) - McKettrick
- Footlight Fever (1941) - Harvey Parker (uncredited)
- The Big Store (1941) - Duke
- Scattergood Meets Broadway (1941) - H. C. Bard
- Badlands of Dakota (1941) - Jesse Chapman (uncredited)
- Roaring Frontiers (1941) - Hawk Hammond
- Mr. District Attorney in the Carter Case (1941) - Elliott Carter
- Freckles Comes Home (1942) - Nate Quigley
- The Bugle Sounds (1942) - Second Adjutant (uncredited)
- Top Sergeant (1942) - Tony Gribaldi
- Sons of the Pioneers (1942) - Frank Bennett
- Isle of Missing Men (1942) - George Kent
- King of the Mounties (1942, Serial) - Blake
- War Dogs (1942) - Judge Roger Davis
- The Traitor Within (1942) - Al McGonigle
- Silent Witness (1943) - District Attorney Robert Holden
- Sherlock Holmes in Washington (1943) - Cady
- What's Buzzin', Cousin? (1943) - Pete Hartley (uncredited)
- Find the Blackmailer (1943) - Mitch Farrell
