= Edward Keane (actor) =

American actor (1884–1959)

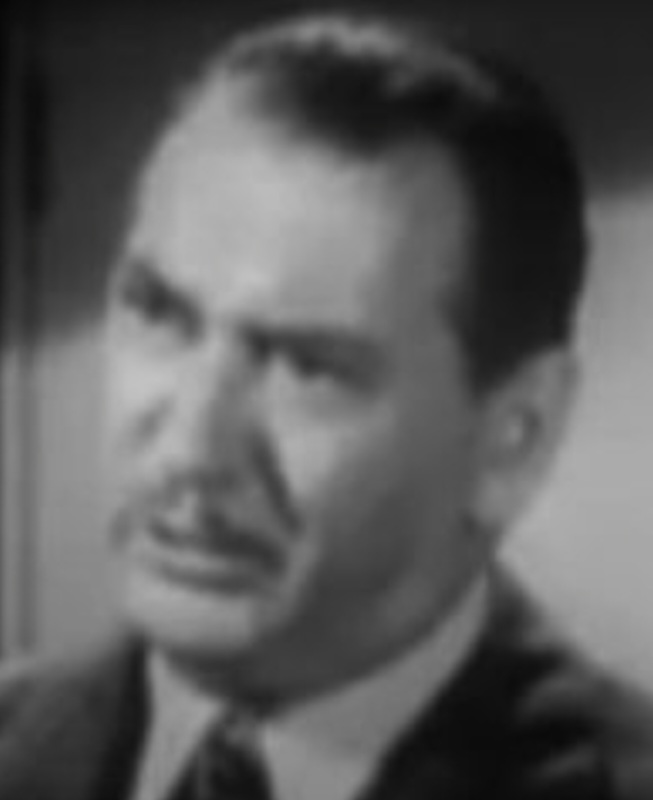
- Keane in Submarine Alert (1943)
- Born: May 28, 1884; New York City, U.S.
- Died: October 12, 1959 (aged 75); Los Angeles, California, U.S.
- Occupation: Actor
- Years active: 1921–1955

Edward Keane (May 28, 1884 – October 12, 1959) was an American film actor. He appeared in more than 300 films between 1921 and 1955.

== Selected filmography ==
- The Supreme Passion (1921) – Dr. Jennings
- The Runaway Bride (1930) – Policeman (uncredited)
- Fast and Loose (1930) – Maitre d' (uncredited)
- Stolen Heaven (1931) – Detective Morgan
- Secrets of a Secretary (1931) – Albany Hotel Manager (uncredited)
- His Woman (1931) – Boatswain (uncredited)
- The Cheat (1931) – Defense Attorney
- Ann Carver's Profession (1933) – Harrison (uncredited)
- I Have Lived (1933) – Leading Man
- Headline Shooter (1933) – Joe Burnett (uncredited)
- One Year Later (1933) – Grant (uncredited)
- Bureau of Missing Persons (1933) – Hotel Manager (uncredited)
- I Loved a Woman (1933) – Businessman at Meeting (uncredited)
- Aggie Appleby, Maker of Men (1933) – Construction Boss (uncredited)
- After Tonight (1933) – Spy R9 (uncredited)
- College Coach (1933) – Shoe Company Executive (uncredited)
- Female (1933) – Department Head (uncredited)
- From Headquarters (1933) – Detective (uncredited)
- Blood Money (1933) – Pool Player – $1000 Bettor (uncredited)
- Havana Widows (1933) – El Havana Hotel Desk Clerk (uncredited)
- I Am Suzanne! (1933) – Theatre Manager
- Massacre (1934) – Prosecutor (uncredited)
- Wonder Bar (1934) – Captain (uncredited)
- Gambling Lady (1934) – The Duke (uncredited)
- Registered Nurse (1934) – Gossip at Club (uncredited)
- The Crime of Helen Stanley (1934) – Mr. Richardson – Studio Manager (uncredited)
- Born to Be Bad (1934) – Admirer at Nightclub (uncredited)
- The Merry Frinks (1934) – Truant Officer
- Now I'll Tell (1934) – Gangster (uncredited)
- Green Eyes (1934) – Raynor
- Stamboul Quest (1934) – Annemarie's Kabarett 'Date' (uncredited)
- Midnight Alibi (1934) – Special Officer in Flashback (uncredited)
- The Count of Monte Cristo (1934) – Bertrand (uncredited)
- Housewife (1934) – William's Lawyer (uncredited)
- One Exciting Adventure (1934) – Hotel manager
- One Night of Love (1934) – Metropolitan Stage Director (uncredited)
- Desirable (1934) – First Playgoer (uncredited)
- Girl in Danger (1934) – Thornton
- Kansas City Princess (1934) – Plaza Garden Captain (uncredited)
- British Agent (1934) – Dr. S. Prohoroff (uncredited)
- A Lost Lady (1934) – The Murderer (uncredited)
- Wake Up and Dream (1934) – (uncredited)
- Gentlemen Are Born (1934) – First Broker (uncredited)
- Jealousy (1934) – District Attorney (uncredited)
- I Am a Thief (1934) – Second Train Conductor (uncredited)
- Broadway Bill (1934) – Headwaiter (uncredited)
- Sing Sing Nights (1934) – Chang (uncredited)
- Mills of the Gods (1934) – Morgan
- Behind the Evidence (1935) – Hackett
- Red Hot Tires (1935) – Defense Attorney (uncredited)
- The Woman in Red (1935) – Horse Show Ring Master (uncredited)
- The Whole Town's Talking (1935) – U.S. Deputy Attorney (uncredited)
- Naughty Marietta (1935) – Major Bonnell (uncredited)
- Public Opinion (1935) – Paul's Attorney
- Circumstantial Evidence (1935) – Judge Samuels
- G Men (1935) – Bank Teller (uncredited)
- Go Into Your Dance (1935) – Producer #3 (uncredited)
- Whispering Smith Speaks (1935) – Rebstock
- Border Brigands (1935) – Inspector Jim Barry, RCMP
- Stranded (1935) – Doctor (uncredited)
- Hard Rock Harrigan (1935) – Dr. Wagner
- Front Page Woman (1935) – Reporter (uncredited)
- The Murder Man (1935) – Joe – Editor (uncredited)
- The Irish in Us (1935) – Doctor (uncredited)
- Orchids to You (1935) – Banker (uncredited)
- Manhattan Butterfly (1935)
- Page Miss Glory (1935) – Advertising Man (uncredited)
- Shipmates Forever (1935) – Doctor on Airplane (uncredited)
- Metropolitan (1935) – Throat Specialist (uncredited)
- The Case of the Missing Man (1935) – Photo Customer (uncredited)
- Three Kids and a Queen (1935) – Gangster (uncredited)
- The Payoff (1935) – Frank (uncredited)
- A Night at the Opera (1935) – Ship's Captain
- Another Face (1935) – Casting Director (uncredited)
- Stars Over Broadway (1935) – Ford (uncredited)
- Frisco Kid (1935) – Contractor (uncredited)
- Show Them No Mercy! (1935) – Doctor (uncredited)
- Man of Iron (1935) – Mortgage Man
- Dangerous (1935) – Doctor (uncredited)
- Exclusive Story (1936) – Al Brown (uncredited)
- It Had to Happen (1936) – Politician (uncredited)
- The Farmer in the Dell (1936) – Robert F. 'Bob' Heath (uncredited)
- Colleen (1936) – Mr. Edwards (uncredited)
- The Singing Kid (1936) – IRS Agent Potter (uncredited)
- Mr. Deeds Goes to Town (1936) – Board Member (uncredited)
- The Drag-Net (1936) – Asst. District Attorney Arthur Hill
- For the Service (1936) – Captain Murphy
- The Princess Comes Across (1936) – Chief Purser (uncredited)
- The Golden Arrow (1936) – Bixby (uncredited)
- Parole! (1936) – District Attorney (uncredited)
- The Devil-Doll (1936) – Gendarme (uncredited)
- Anthony Adverse (1936) – Officer (uncredited)
- Jailbreak (1936) – Attorney (uncredited)
- Missing Girls (1936) – District Attorney
- Down the Stretch (1936) – Fred Yates (uncredited)
- The Man Who Lived Twice (1936) – Police Commissioner (uncredited)
- Gambling with Souls (1936) – Attorney
- Mummy's Boys (1936) – Ship's Captain (uncredited)
- Legion of Terror (1936) – Governor (uncredited)
- Can This Be Dixie? (1936) – Mr. Hancock (uncredited)
- California Mail (1936) – Thompson
- The Boss Rider of Gun Creek (1936) – Lawyer
- We Who Are About to Die (1937) – Ed Stanley (uncredited)
- Westbound Mail (1937) – 'Gun' Barlow
- Once a Doctor (1937) – Captain Littlejohn, S.S. Orlando
- Time Out for Romance (1937) – Stanhope (uncredited)
- When You're in Love (1937) – Stage Manager (uncredited)
- Her Husband Lies (1937) – Second Investigator (uncredited)
- Seventh Heaven (1937) – Gendarme
- I Promise to Pay (1937) – Mike Reardon
- Charlie Chan at the Olympics (1937) – Army Colonel (uncredited)
- San Quentin (1937) – 2nd Detective (uncredited)
- The Californian (1937) – Marshal Morse
- High, Wide and Handsome (1937) – Jones (uncredited)
- Reported Missing (1937) – Inspector Rhinock (uncredited)
- Confession (1937) – Cabaret Manager (voice, uncredited)
- That Certain Woman (1937) – Opposing Counsel (scenes deleted)
- The Firefly (1937) – French Chief of Staff (uncredited)
- Fit for a King (1937) – Reception Guest (uncredited)
- Dangerously Yours (1937) – Bronson (uncredited)
- Madame X (1937) – Gendarme at Villa (uncredited)
- Alcatraz Island (1937) – U.S. Attorney Crandall (uncredited)
- Hollywood Round-Up (1937) – Lew Wallace
- Submarine D-1 (1937) – Captain on Battleship (uncredited)
- Checkers (1937) – Paddock Judge (uncredited)
- Missing Witnesses (1937) – District Attorney (uncredited)
- You're a Sweetheart (1937) – Backstage Reporter (uncredited)
- Wells Fargo (1937) – Salmon P. Chase – Secretary of the Treasury (uncredited)
- Sergeant Murphy (1938) – Major Biddle (uncredited)
- In Old Chicago (1938) – Politician in Jack's Office (uncredited)
- The Invisible Menace (1938) – Officer at Dolman's Hearing (uncredited)
- International Settlement (1938) – Captain (uncredited)
- Gold Is Where You Find It (1938) – San Francisco Bar Patron (uncredited)
- The Baroness and the Butler (1938) – Guard (uncredited)
- Love on a Budget (1938) – Bank Manager (uncredited)
- Extortion (1938) – Brooks (uncredited)
- Alexander's Ragtime Band (1938) – Army Major (uncredited)
- Josette (1938) – Doorman (uncredited)
- Speed to Burn (1938) – Police Chief (uncredited)
- Border G-Man (1938) – Colonel Christie
- The Toy Wife (1938) – Auctioneer (uncredited)
- Marie Antoinette (1938) – General (uncredited)
- The Shopworn Angel (1938) – Army Captain (uncredited)
- I Am the Law (1938) – Witness (uncredited)
- You Can't Take It with You (1938) – Board Member (uncredited)
- Slander House (1938) – George Horton
- Shadows Over Shanghai (1938) – American Consul
- Girls on Probation (1938) – Mr. Bob Brian (uncredited)
- The Great Waltz (1938) – Officer (uncredited)
- I Demand Payment (1938) – District Attorney
- Torchy Gets Her Man (1938) – Henchman Stoneham (uncredited)
- Nancy Drew... Detective (1938) – Adam Thorne
- Kentucky (1938) – Man at Race Track (uncredited)
- Stand Up and Fight (1939) – Donnelly (uncredited)
- Devil's Island (1939) – Duval, Camp Doctor
- Wings of the Navy (1939) – Psychology Examiner (uncredited)
- Three Smart Girls Grow Up (1939) – Stock Broker (uncredited)
- The Story of Alexander Graham Bell (1939) – Banker at Demo (uncredited)
- Mr. Moto in Danger Island (1939) – Washington Official (uncredited)
- Frontier Pony Express (1939) – Senator Calhoun Lassister
- Confessions of a Nazi Spy (1939) – FBI Agent (uncredited)
- Union Pacific (1939) – Man (uncredited)
- Ex-Champ (1939) – Clerk (uncredited)
- My Wife's Relatives (1939) – Jarvis
- The Sun Never Sets (1939) – DNXY Radio Operator (uncredited)
- They All Come Out (1939) – Social Service Director (uncredited)
- When Tomorrow Comes (1939) – Man Announcing End Of Strike (uncredited)
- Chicken Wagon Family (1939) – Bank Manager (uncredited)
- The Angels Wash Their Faces (1939) – Defense Attorney (uncredited)
- Rio (1939) – Mr. Albert (uncredited)
- The Escape (1939) – Captain of Detectives (uncredited)
- The Roaring Twenties (1939) – Henderson
- Heroes in Blue (1939) – Moran
- The Big Guy (1939) – Lait (uncredited)
- The Green Hornet (1940, Serial) – Williams [Ch. 13] (uncredited)
- The Man Who Wouldn't Talk (1940) – Warden (uncredited)
- Hidden Enemy (1940) – Newspaper Editor
- I Take This Woman (1940) – Dr. Harrison (uncredited)
- Charlie Chan in Panama (1940) – Dr. Fredericks
- Virginia City (1940) – Officer (uncredited)
- Midnight Limited (1940) – Capt. Harrigan
- And One Was Beautiful (1940) – Prosecuting Attorney (uncredited)
- 'Til We Meet Again (1940) – Ship Officer (uncredited)
- Edison, the Man (1940) – Lecturer (uncredited)
- A Fugitive from Justice (1940) – Partridge
- Winners of the West (1940, Serial) – John Hartford
- Sailor's Lady (1940) – Captain's Aide (uncredited)
- The Golden Fleecing (1940) – Barney – Fender's Lawyer (uncredited)
- Money and the Woman (1940) – Mr. Kaiser
- City for Conquest (1940) – Gaul
- A Dispatch from Reuters (1940) – Reporter (uncredited)
- The Son of Monte Cristo (1940) – Turnkey
- Ride, Kelly, Ride (1941) – Steward (uncredited)
- Road Show (1941) – Newton (uncredited)
- Meet John Doe (1941) – Relief Administrator (uncredited)
- Knockout (1941) – Indianapolis Athletic Commission Official (uncredited)
- Men of Boys Town (1941) – District Attorney (scenes deleted)
- South of Panama (1941) – Colonel Stoddard
- Her First Beau (1941) – Mr. Wharton (uncredited)
- Broadway Limited (1941) – Man Reading Newspaper (uncredited)
- Blossoms in the Dust (1941) – Second Businessman (uncredited)
- Double Cross (1941) – Commissioner Bob Trent
- Sergeant York (1941) – Oscar of the Waldorf (uncredited)
- They Meet Again (1941) – Prosecuting Attorney (uncredited)
- Harmon of Michigan (1941) – City Editor (uncredited)
- Riders of the Timberline (1941) – Preston Yates
- Sea Raiders (1941, Serial) – Elliott Carlton [Chs. 1–7]
- Blues in the Night (1941) – Drunk Saying, 'It's a Scream' (uncredited)
- They Died with Their Boots On (1941) – Congressman (uncredited)
- Man with Two Lives (1942) – Dr. Richard Clark
- Kid Glove Killer (1942) – Forsythe – Second Politician (uncredited)
- Who Is Hope Schuyler? (1942) – Judge
- Yankee Doodle Dandy (1942) – Critic #2 (uncredited)
- I Live on Danger (1942) – Chief Investigator E.G. Lambert (uncredited)
- The Old Homestead (1942) – Inspector O'Brien (uncredited)
- Wildcat (1942) – Oil Investor (uncredited)
- Who Done It? (1942) – Carter (uncredited)
- Pittsburgh (1942) – Headwaiter (uncredited)
- The Traitor Within (1942) – Davis
- Ice-Capades Revue (1942) – Gabby Haskoff (uncredited)
- The Adventures of Smilin' Jack (1943, Serial) – Hon. George Hill [Chs. 8–12] (uncredited)
- G-Men vs. the Black Dragon (1943) – Gordon (uncredited)
- It Comes Up Love (1943) – Headwaiter (uncredited)
- Truck Busters (1943) – Elliott
- Submarine Alert (1943) – J.D. Deerhold's Boss (uncredited)
- Let's Have Fun (1943) – James Bradley
- Mission to Moscow (1943) – Isolationist (uncredited)
- A Stranger in Town (1943) – Blaxton's Lawyer
- Dr. Gillespie's Criminal Case (1943) – Stiles (uncredited)
- I Escaped from the Gestapo (1943) – Domack – Head of Gestapo Gang
- The Good Fellows (1943) – Brother Lewis (uncredited)
- Someone to Remember (1943) – College Trustee (uncredited)
- Sweet Rosie O'Grady (1943) – Little (uncredited)
- Government Girl (1943) – Irate Man (uncredited)
- Death Valley Manhunt (1943) – Ross (uncredited)
- Klondike Kate (1943) – Sullivan (uncredited)
- The Song of Bernadette (1943) – Policeman (uncredited)
- California Joe (1943) – Gov. Glynn (uncredited)
- Sing a Jingle (1944) – Philip Jonas (uncredited)
- Captain America (1944, Serial) – Agent 33 [Ch. 15]
- Voodoo Man (1944) – District Attorney (uncredited)
- The Navy Way (1944) – Randall Guest (uncredited)
- The Lady and the Monster (1944) – Manning (uncredited)
- Bermuda Mystery (1944) – Police Inspector (uncredited)
- A Night of Adventure (1944) – Assistant District Attorney (uncredited)
- Take It Big (1944) – Customer (uncredited)
- Goodnight, Sweetheart (1944) – Trial Judge (uncredited)
- South of Dixie (1944) – Mr. Platt
- A Fig Leaf for Eve (1944) – Horace Sardham
- Wilson (1944) – Hughes Campaign Orator (uncredited)
- When Strangers Marry (1944) – Middle – Aged Husband on Train
- Haunted Harbor (1944, Serial) – Fredrick Vorhees [Ch. 1]
- One Mysterious Night (1944) – Police Commissioner Howard (uncredited)
- Rogues' Gallery (1944) – Gentry – City Editor
- Nothing but Trouble (1944) – Police Chief Smith (uncredited)
- Fashion Model (1945) – Jacques Duval
- Boston Blackie Booked on Suspicion (1945) – Dr. Barclay (uncredited)
- Nob Hill (1945) – Politician (uncredited)
- Scarlet Street (1945) – Detective (uncredited)
- Colonel Effingham's Raid (1946) – Dr. Evans (uncredited)
- Night Editor (1946) – Police Chief Burns (uncredited)
- If I'm Lucky (1946) – Golfer (uncredited)
- Roll on Texas Moon (1946) – Frank B. Wilson
- Angel on My Shoulder (1946) – Prison Yard Captain (uncredited)
- Sister Kenny (1946) – Reporter (uncredited)
- The Jolson Story (1946) – Winter Garden Director (uncredited)
- Out California Way (1946) – E.J. Pearson
- Boston Blackie and the Law (1946) – Andrews, Bank Manager (uncredited)
- It's a Wonderful Life (1946) – Tom (Bldg. & Loan)
- Trail to San Antone (1947) – Sheriff Jones
- Calendar Girl (1947) – Battalion Chief (uncredited)
- Undercover Maisie (1947) – Police Chief (uncredited)
- Saddle Pals (1947) – Doctor (uncredited)
- The Perils of Pauline (1947) – Bond Buyer (uncredited)
- The Unfinished Dance (1947) – Clock Customer (uncredited)
- Key Witness (1947) – Police Chief Crandall (uncredited)
- The Invisible Wall (1947) – Marty Floyd
- On the Old Spanish Trail (1947) – Mr. Burnett (uncredited)
- Desire Me (1947) – The Baker (uncredited)
- The Hat Box Mystery (1947) – District Attorney
- Roses Are Red (1947) – Jim Locke
- The Judge Steps Out (1948) – Judge (uncredited)
- The Gallant Blade (1948) – Admiral Breeze (uncredited)
- Chicken Every Sunday (1949) – Joe (uncredited)
- The Lucky Stiff (1949) – Headwaiter (uncredited)
- Hellfire (1949) – Edwards (uncredited)
- It Happens Every Spring (1949) – Jack Bell (uncredited)
- Madame Bovary (1949) – Presiding Judge (uncredited)
- The Story of Seabiscuit (1949) – The $15K Bidder (uncredited)
- The Baron of Arizona (1950) – Surveyor General Miller
- A Woman of Distinction (1950) – Police Desk Sergeant (uncredited)
- The Good Humor Man (1950) – Doctor (uncredited)
- The Invisible Monster (1950) – Warren Madison (uncredited)
- Twilight in the Sierras (1950) – Judge Wiggins
- A Modern Marriage (1950) – Dr. Connors
- Belle Le Grand (1951) – Carter (uncredited)
- Show Boat (1951) – Hotel Manager (uncredited)
- Deadline – U.S.A. (1952) – Mr. Blake, Mrs. Garrison's Lawyer (uncredited)
- The Court-Martial of Billy Mitchell (1955) – Court-Martial Judge (uncredited)
