= Otto Meyer =

Otto Meyer may refer to:

- Otto Meyer (SS officer) (1912–1944), officer in the Waffen SS awarded the Knight's Cross with Oakleaves
- Otto Meyer (film editor) (1901–1980), American film editor
- Otto Meyer (gymnast), French Olympic gymnast
