= Get That Girl =

Get That Girl may refer to:

- Get That Girl (1932 film), an American film directed by George Crone
- The British title of Caryl of the Mountains, a 1936 American film directed by Bernard B. Ray
