= The Little Giant (1933 film) =

1933 film by Roy Del Ruth

- Theatrical release poster
- Directed by: Roy Del Ruth
- Written by: Robert Lord; Wilson Mizner
- Produced by: Raymond Griffith
- Starring: Edward G. Robinson; Mary Astor; Helen Vinson
- Cinematography: Sidney Hickox; M. A. Anderson
- Edited by: George Marks; Ray Curtiss
- Music by: Leo F. Forbstein
- Production company: First National Pictures
- Distributed by: Warner Bros. Pictures
- Release date: May 20, 1933
- Running time: 76 minutes
- Country: United States
- Language: English

The Little Giant is a 1933 American pre-Code crime comedy romance. It follows the attempts of an ex-gangster to make his way into high society.

The film was directed by Roy Del Ruth and starring Edward G. Robinson and Mary Astor. It was produced by First National Pictures while being distributed by Warner Bros. Pictures.

The Library of Congress has preserved a print of this film.

== Plot ==
Mobster Jim (Bugs) Ahearn, realizing that the end of prohibition is only months away, decides to quit the bootlegging racket and work to elevate his culture and status by reading books and investing in art, and ultimately by leaving Chicago for Santa Barbara, where he attempts to fit into the upper crust of society. He invests in polo ponies, joins a polo team (he's terrible, but is tolerated because of his money), and falls in love with Polly Cass while being blind to the woman who truly loves him, Ruth Wayburn. After sinking a massive amount of cash into Polly's father's investment firm, which, unbeknownst to Bugs, is crooked and on the verge of bankruptcy, the Cass family discovers Bugs' criminal past. They cancel his engagement to Polly and plan to flee to Europe. When Bugs finds out, he calls in his old gang from Chicago, who, through a variety of means, retrieve Bugs' money from the crooked investors. He ultimately realizes that Ruth is the girl for him, and we close on the couple watching his uncouth mobsters playing a most unorthodox version of a polo game.

== Cast ==
- Edward G. Robinson as Bugs Ahearn
- Mary Astor as Ruth Wayburn
- Helen Vinson as Polly Cass
- Russell Hopton as Al Daniels
- Kenneth Thomson as John Stanley
- Shirley Grey as Edith Merriam
- Berton Churchill as Donald Hadley Cass
- Donald Dillaway as Gordon Cass
- Louise Mackintosh as Mrs. Dudley Hadley Cass
- Adrian Morris as Seated Milano Hood
