= The Girl Who Came Back (1935 film) =

1935 film by Charles Lamont

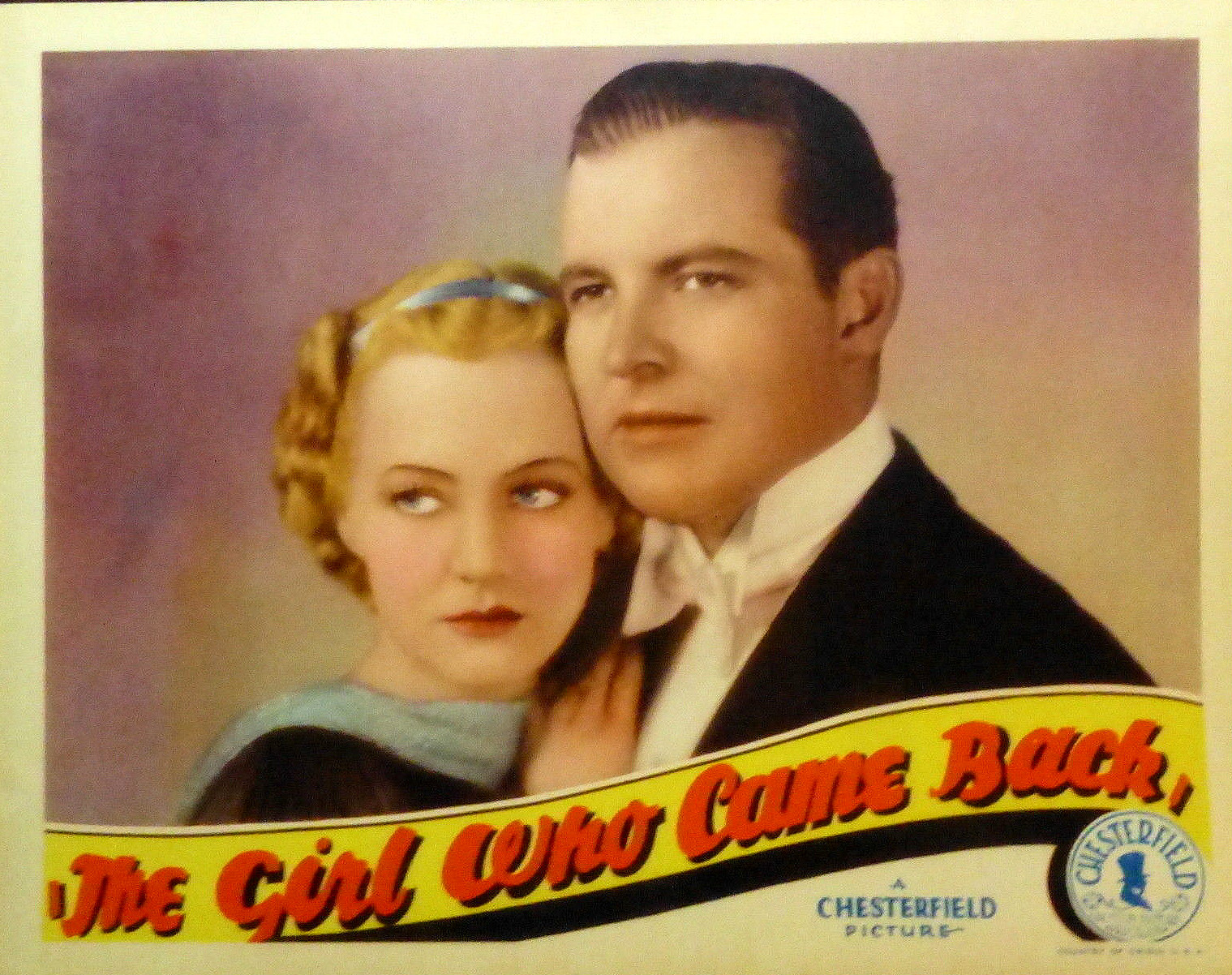
- Lobby card
- Directed by: Charles Lamont
- Written by: Ewart Adamson
- Produced by: George R. Batcheller
- Starring: Shirley Grey; Sidney Blackmer; Noel Madison
- Cinematography: M.A. Anderson
- Edited by: Roland D. Reed
- Music by: Sidney Cutner
- Production company: Chesterfield Pictures
- Distributed by: Chesterfield Pictures
- Release date: June 21, 1935
- Running time: 65 minutes
- Country: United States
- Language: English

The Girl Who Came Back is a 1935 American crime film directed by Charles Lamont and starring Shirley Grey, Sidney Blackmer, and Noel Madison.

== Plot ==
New York City jewel thief Gilda Gillespie is determined to go straight, much against the wishes of her male gang who bully and goad her by calling her a coward into doing one last robbery. She sets up the robbery, but returns the jewels to the victim, then heads to Hollywood where she becomes a bank president's secretary with the president eyeing her romantically.

Her gang tracks her down and coerces her to use her position to facilitate a bank robbery.

== Cast ==
- Shirley Grey as Gilda Gillespie aka Mary Brown
- Sidney Blackmer as Bill Rhodes
- Noel Madison as Brewster
- Matthew Betz as Smoky
- Torben Meyer as Zarabella
- May Beatty as Aunty
- Frank LaRue as Detective Burke
- Ida Darling as Mrs. Rhodes
- Robert Adair as Charles Matthews
- Edward Martindel as Chester Madison
- John Dilson as Wadsworth

== Bibliography ==
- Michael R. Pitts. Poverty Row Studios, 1929–1940: An Illustrated History of 55 Independent Film Companies, with a Filmography for Each. McFarland & Company, 2005.
