= Ethel Hill =

American screenwriter and race horse owner

- Born: April 6, 1898; Sacramento, California, U.S.
- Died: May 17, 1954 (aged 56); Hollywood, California, U.S.
- Occupation: Screenwriter
- Years active: 1914-1946

Ethel Hill (1898–1954) was an American screenwriter and race horse owner. One of her best-known scripts is for The Little Princess (1939), starring Shirley Temple.

== Early life ==
Ethel was born in Sacramento, California, the eldest daughter of Charles Hill and Susie Marston. The family moved to Los Angeles when Ethel was young, and she and her younger sister Garna attended high school in Santa Monica.

== Career ==
=== Hollywood ===
When Dore Schary first went to work for Columbia Pictures as a new screenwriter, he was paired with the veteran Hill to learn from her; together, they wrote the screenplay for Fury of the Jungle (1933). Hill was described by Marc Norman in his book What Happens Next: A History of American Screenwriting as "an extremely dear and generous woman [who] had an interest in horses and often wore jodhpurs and riding gear to the studio." Fellow screenwriter Gertrude Walker—who worked with Hill toward the end of her career at Republic Pictures—described her as "a sweet old lady" who always wore a shawl and bedroom slippers.

=== Horse racing ===
Hill bought the Thoroughbred race horse War Knight, a son of Preakness winner High Quest, as a foal "with her $1500 life savings". He went on to win 10 of 28 starts, including the 1944 Arlington Handicap. He was injured in 1945 and did not win any of his five 1946 starts leading up to the $100,000 added Santa Anita Handicap, which he proceeded to win in a photo finish. He retired to stud afterward.

== Partial filmography ==
As screenwriter, unless otherwise indicated.

- The Level (1914 short)
- The Guilt of Silence (1918)
- The Eagle (1918)
- Every Man's Wife (1925, story)
- Dollar Down (1925, story)
- The Masquerade Bandit (1926)
- Driven from Home (1927)
- Young Whirlwind (1928)
- Fangs of the Wild (1928)
- Dog Justice (1928)
- Law of Fear (1928)
- The Scarlet Brand (1932)
- Virtue (1932, story)
- Fury of the Jungle (1933)
- Ship of Wanted Men (1933)
- Whirlpool (1934)
- Side Streets (1934, story)
- Blind Date (1934)
- Party Wire (1935)
- Eight Bells (1935)
- The Public Menace (1935)
- The Best Man Wins (1935)
- More Than a Secretary (1936, story)
- When You're in Love (1937, story)
- It Happened in Hollywood (1937)
- Just Around the Corner (1938)
- The Little Princess (1939)
- Maryland (1940)
- For Beauty's Sake (1941)
- Dance Hall (1941)
- Small Town Deb (1941)
- Maisie Gets Her Man (1942)
- In Old Oklahoma (1943)
- The Fighting Seabees (1945, uncredited contributing writer)
- Twice Blessed (1945)
- Two Smart People (1946)
