= Ridin' for Justice =

1932 film

- Film poster
- Directed by: D. Ross Lederman
- Written by: Harold Shumate
- Produced by: Irving Briskin
- Starring: Buck Jones; Mary Doran; Russell Simpson
- Cinematography: Benjamin H. Kline
- Edited by: Maurice Wright
- Distributed by: Columbia Pictures Corporation
- Release date: January 4, 1932
- Running time: 61 minutes
- Country: United States
- Language: English

Ridin' for Justice is a 1932 American pre-Code Western film directed by D. Ross Lederman and starring Buck Jones, Mary Doran, and Russell Simpson.

== Plot ==
Buck Randall, a carefree cowboy whose popularity with the local saloon girls becomes the talk of the town. The new marshal, Joseph Slyde, gets on Buck's bad side by enforcing a "no gun" rule. Buck returns the favor by falling in love with the marshal's mistreated wife, Mary, and she asks her husband for a divorce so she can marry Buck.

== Cast ==
- Buck Jones as Buck Randall
- Mary Doran as Mary Slyde
- Russell Simpson as Marshal Joseph Slyde
- Walter Miller as Deputy Alex Frame
- Robert McKenzie as Judge Septimus P. Spear (as Bob McKanzie)
- Will Walling as Ranch Boss Tom Wilson (as William Walling)
- Billy Engle as Sam - the Stutterer
- Hank Mann as Pete - The Drunk
