= Fury of the Jungle =

1933 film

- Directed by: Roy William Neill
- Written by: Ethel Hill; Horace McCoy; Dore Schary
- Produced by: Robert North
- Starring: Donald Cook; Peggy Shannon; Alan Dinehart
- Cinematography: John Stumar
- Edited by: Ray Curtiss
- Production company: Columbia Pictures
- Distributed by: Columbia Pictures
- Release date: October 23, 1933
- Running time: 68 minutes
- Country: United States
- Language: English

Fury of the Jungle is a 1933 American pre-Code adventure film directed by Roy William Neill and starring Donald Cook, Peggy Shannon and Alan Dinehart. It was co-written by Dore Schary from a story by Horace McCoy.

== Plot ==
A love triangle story set in Malango, a remote jungle village in South America harboring a diverse assortment of European expats and criminal types, controlled by the cruel Taggart (Alan Dinehart). The heroine, Joan Leesom (Peggy Shannon), arrives on a river steamer with her brother, Arthur, in search of a lost city. Arthur has contracted a febrile illness and they are forced to disembark in the village, staying in the hut of "Lucky" Allen (Donald Cook), an escaped convict and former Marine who seemingly cannot abide women. Taggart, wanting to possess Joan, sees that the local doctor, Parrish (Dudley Digges), fails to help Arthur in time to save his life, leaving Joan alone with Lucky, with whom she falls in love. Lucky, feeling sympathy for Joan, endeavors to secure his passage with her out of the village by heading into the bush to collect animal pelts. Meanwhile, Taggart duels a convicted murderer, Frenchy, over Joan, killing him. On Lucky's return, Taggart attempts to frame him for the theft of a wallet. Parrish intervenes and is thrown to the crocodiles. Finally, Chita (Toshia Mori), a local woman ill-used by Taggart, reveals to her people the extent of Taggart's machinations, with the result that the villagers ensure that he receives Parrish's fate. Joan and Lucky then are able to escape from Malango and marry.

== Cast ==
- Donald Cook as "Lucky" Allen
- Peggy Shannon as Joan
- Dudley Digges as 'Doc' Parrish
- Alan Dinehart as Taggart
- Harold Huber as Gaston Labelle aka Frenchy
- Toshia Mori as Chita
- Fredrik Vogeding as Captain Peterson
- Clarence Muse as Sunrise
- Charles Stevens as Kimba
