= Shirley Grey =

American actress (1902–1981)

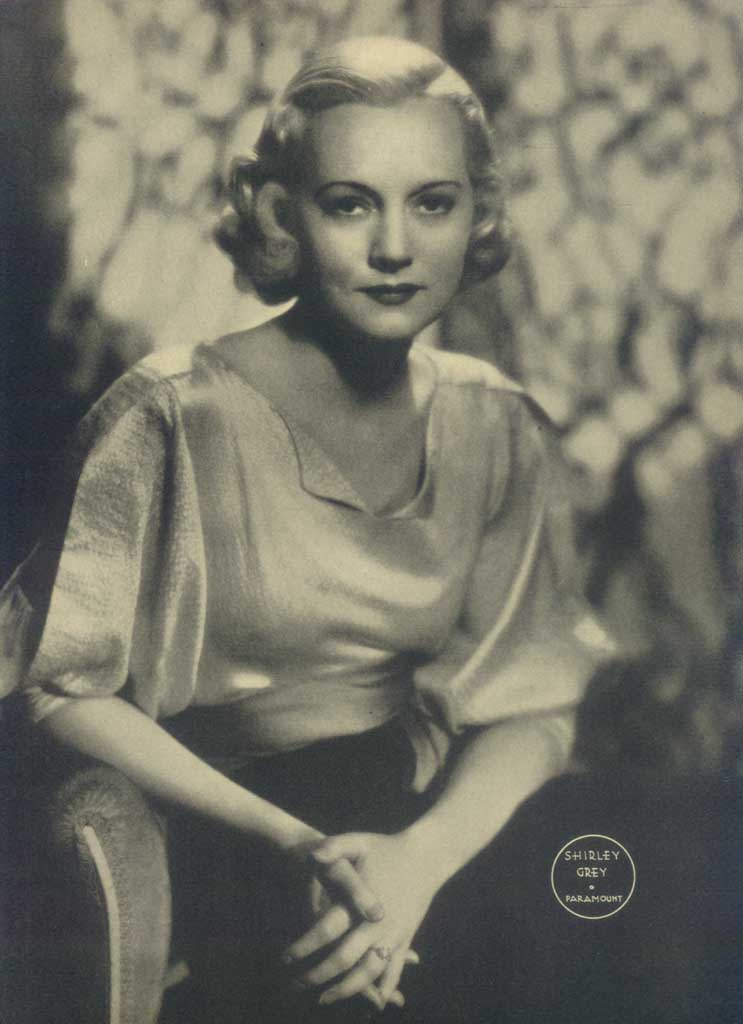
- Grey in 1933
- Born: Agnes Evangeline Zetterstrand; April 3, 1902; Naugatuck, Connecticut, U.S.
- Died: August 12, 1981 (aged 79); Jacksonville Beach, Florida, U.S.
- Occupation: Actress
- Years active: 1930–1935
- Spouses: Foster Williams (m. 1921; div. 1925) Arthur Margetson (m. 1936; died 1951)

Shirley Grey (born Agnes Evangeline Zetterstrand; April 3, 1902 – August 12, 1981) was an American actress. She appeared in more than 40 films between 1930 and 1935.

== Early years ==
Born in Naugatuck, Connecticut, Grey was the daughter of Ernst Adrian Zetterstrand, a minister, who died when she was eight years old. Thereafter, her mother raised Grey and her six siblings. She graduated from Waterbury High School, where she was active in the Dramatic Club.

== Career ==
Grey began her acting career with the Poli Players. She went on to act with companies in New Orleans, Louisiana; Jacksonville, Florida; San Francisco, California, and Nova Scotia. She had her own acting troupe, the Shirley Grey Players, in the late 1920s. In 1931, she starred in the comedy-drama Chicago at the Fulton Theater in Oakland, California. It was the third play of Grey's "limited season".

Grey's work in stock theater led to her career in films. A talent scout who worked for film producer Samuel Goldwyn saw Grey performing in a stock production in Oakland and arranged for her to take a screen test, which led to her signing a contract with Goldwyn. Most of her movie roles were in the Pre-Code era, where she had notable supporting roles in such movies as The Little Giant (1933) and The Life of Jimmy Dolan (1933).

== Personal life ==
On August 28, 1921, Grey married actor Foster Williams, known professionally as Frank McCarthy. They had one son. She filed for divorce from him on September 30, 1925. In 1936, Grey married English actor Arthur Margetson, who died in 1951.

In her later years, Grey was a semi-recluse, living with her sisters before moving to a Jacksonville Beach, Florida, convalescent home where she died.

== Partial filmography ==
- The Golf Specialist (1930, Short) - House Detective's Wife (uncredited)
- The Public Defender (1931) - Barbara Gerry
- Secret Service (1931) - Miss Edith Varney
- Air Eagles (1931) - Eve
- One Man Law (1932) - Grace Duncan
- Texas Cyclone (1932) - Helen Rawlings
- The Riding Tornado (1932) - Patsy Olcott
- Get That Girl (1932) - Ruth Dale
- The Hurricane Express (1932) - Gloria Martin / Gloria Stratton
- Cornered (1932) - Jane Herrick
- Drifting Souls (1932) - Greta Janson
- Back Street (1932) - Francine
- Virtue (1932) - Gert
- Uptown New York (1932) - Patricia Smith
- Treason (1933) - Joan Randall
- From Hell to Heaven (1933) - Winnie Lloyd
- Private Jones (1933) - Helen Jones
- Out All Night (1933) - Kate
- Terror Aboard (1933) - Lili Kingston
- The Little Giant (1933) - Edith Merriam
- The Girl in 419 (1933) - Nurse Irene Blaine
- The Life of Jimmy Dolan (1933) - Goldie West
- Don't Bet on Love (1933) - Goldie Williams
- Too Much Harmony (1933) - Lilyan
- Hold the Press (1933) - Edith White
- Murder on the Campus (1933) - Lillian Voyne
- Twin Husbands (1933) - Chloe Werrenden
- Bombay Mail (1934) - Beatrice Jones aka Sonia Smeganoff
- I Like It That Way (1934) - Peggy
- Sisters Under the Skin (1934) - Gilda Gordon
- The Crime of Helen Stanley (1934) - Betty Lane
- One Is Guilty (1934) - Sally Grey
- Green Eyes (1934) - Jean Kester
- The Defense Rests (1934) - Mabel Wilson
- His Greatest Gamble (1934) - Bernice Solon
- Beyond the Law (1934) - Helen Glenn
- Girl in Danger (1934) - Gloria Gale
- Wednesday's Child (1934) - Louise
- Transatlantic Merry-Go-Round (1934) - Anya Rosson
- Public Opinion (1935) - Joan Nash
- Circumstantial Evidence (1935) - Adrienne Grey
- The People's Enemy (1935) - Ann Griffin
- The Girl Who Came Back (1935) - Gilda Gillespie aka Mary Brown
- The Public Menace (1935) - Mimi LaVerne
- The Mystery of the Mary Celeste (1935) - Sarah Briggs
