= The Final Hour (film) =

1936 film

- Directed by: D. Ross Lederman
- Written by: Harold Shumate
- Starring: Ralph Bellamy; Marguerite Churchill; John Gallaudet
- Cinematography: Lucien Ballard
- Edited by: John Rawlins
- Distributed by: Columbia Pictures
- Release date: July 7, 1936
- Running time: 57 minutes
- Country: United States
- Language: English

The Final Hour, also released as San Francisco Nights, is a 1936 American drama film directed by D. Ross Lederman.

== Plot ==
A disgraced attorney is rescued by a former gangster and girlfriend whom he later clears of murder.

== Cast ==
- Ralph Bellamy as John Vickery
- Marguerite Churchill as Flo Russell
- John Gallaudet as Red McLarnen
- George McKay as Charlie
- Elisabeth Risdon as Fortune Teller
- Marc Lawrence as Mike Magellon
- Lina Basquette as Belle
