= Ralph Bellamy =

American actor (1904–1991)

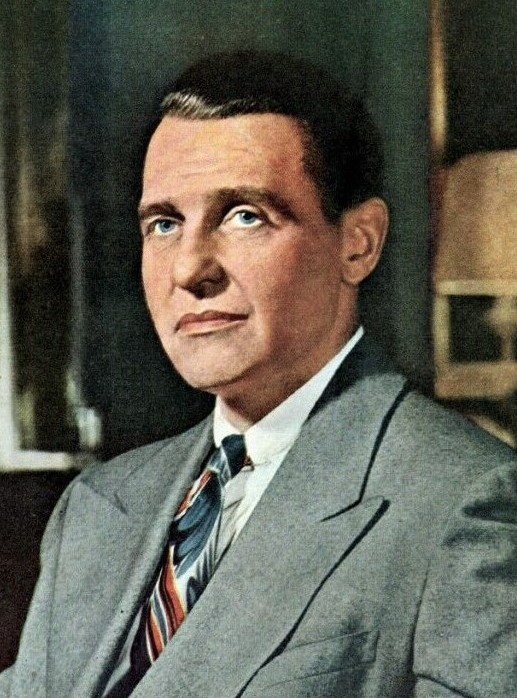
- Bellamy in 1945
- Born: Ralph Rexford Bellamy; June 17, 1904; Chicago, Illinois, U.S.
- Died: November 29, 1991 (aged 87); Santa Monica, California, U.S.
- Resting place: Forest Lawn Memorial Park, Hollywood Hills
- Occupation: Actor
- Years active: 1925–1990
- Political party: Democratic
- Spouses: Alice Delbridge (m. 1927; div. 1930) Catherine Willard (m. 1931; div. 1945) Ethel Smith (m. 1945; div. 1947) Alice Murphy (m. 1949)

7th President of the Actors' Equity Association
- In office 1952–1964
- Preceded by: Clarence Derwent
- Succeeded by: Frederick O'Neal

Ralph Rexford Bellamy (June 17, 1904 – November 29, 1991) was an American actor whose career spanned 65 years on stage, film, and television. During his career, he played leading roles as well as supporting roles, garnering acclaim and awards, including a Tony Award for Best Actor in a Play for Sunrise at Campobello as well as Academy Award for Best Supporting Actor nomination for The Awful Truth (1937). In 1986, Bellamy was awarded with an Academy Honorary Award.

He gained prominence for his roles in Boy Meets Girl (1938), His Girl Friday (1940), Flight Angels (1940), The Wolf Man (1941), and Sunrise at Campobello (1960). He is also known for his later roles in Rosemary's Baby (1968), Oh, God! (1977), Trading Places (1983), and Pretty Woman (1990).

== Early life ==
Bellamy was born on June 17, 1904, in Chicago, Illinois. He was the son of Lilla Louise (née Smith), a native of Canada, and Charles Rexford Bellamy. He ran away from home when he was 15 and managed to gain employment in a road show. He toured with road shows before finally landing in New York City. He began acting on stage there and, by 1927, owned his own theater company. In 1931, he made his film debut and worked constantly throughout the decade both as a lead and as a capable supporting actor. He co-starred in five films with Fay Wray.

== Career ==
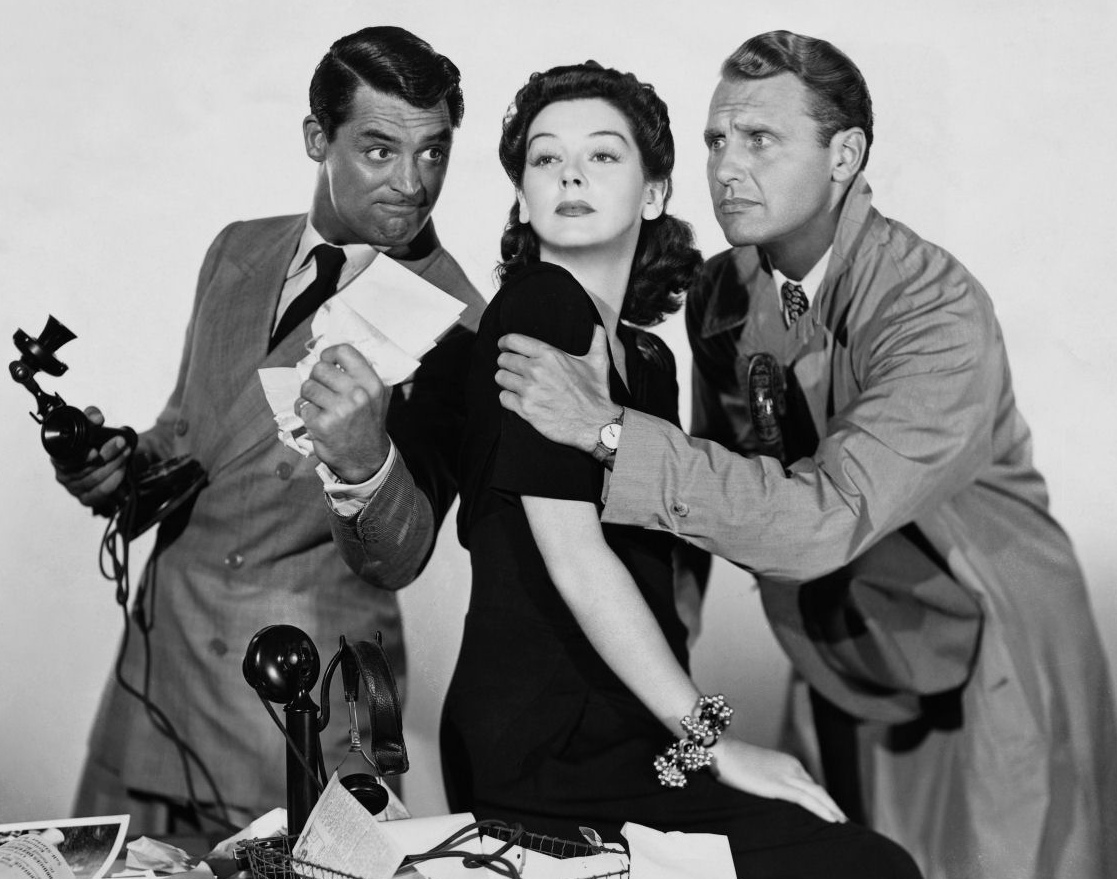
Cary Grant, Rosalind Russell and Bellamy in a publicity shot for His Girl Friday (1940)

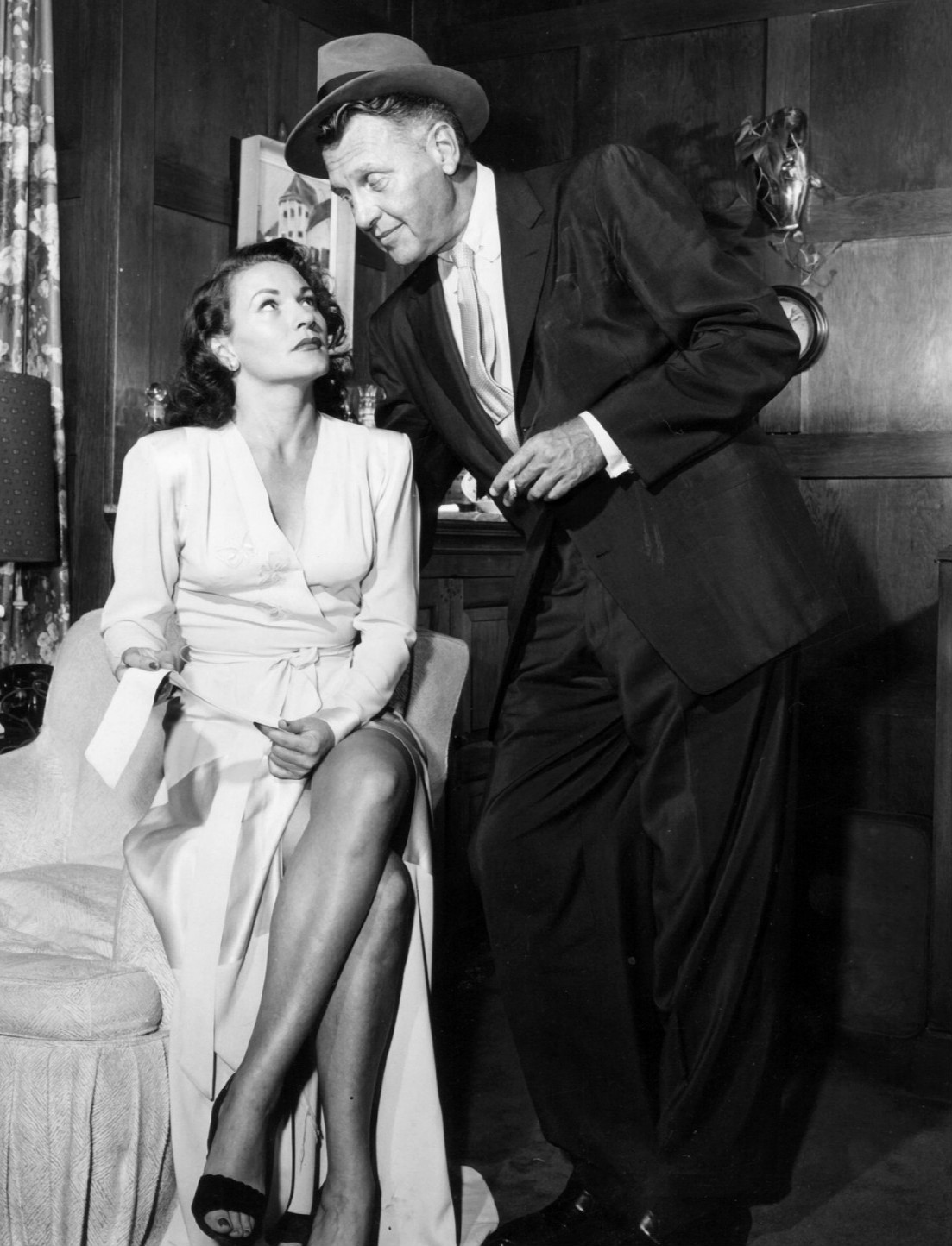
Gloria McGehee and Ralph Bellamy in Man Against Crime (1953)

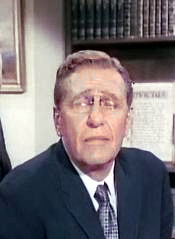
As Franklin D. Roosevelt in the film Sunrise at Campobello (1960)

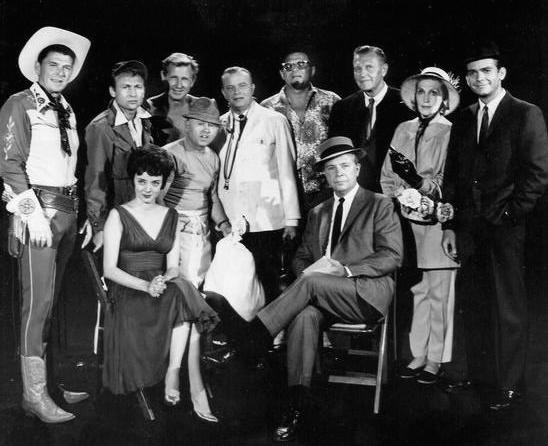
Guest stars for the 1961 premiere episode of The Dick Powell Show, "Who Killed Julie Greer?". Standing, from left: Ronald Reagan, Nick Adams, Lloyd Bridges, Mickey Rooney, Edgar Bergen, Jack Carson, Ralph Bellamy, Kay Thompson, Dean Jones. Seated, from left: Carolyn Jones and Dick Powell.

His film career began with The Secret Six (1931), starring Wallace Beery and featuring Jean Harlow and Clark Gable. By the end of 1933, he had already appeared in 22 movies, including Rebecca of Sunnybrook Farm (1932) and the second lead in the action film Picture Snatcher with James Cagney (1933). He played in seven more films in 1934 alone, including Woman in the Dark, based on a Dashiell Hammett story, in which Bellamy played the lead, second billed under Fay Wray. Bellamy received a nomination for the Academy Award for Best Supporting Actor for his role in The Awful Truth (1937) with Irene Dunne and Cary Grant, and played a similar part, that of a naive boyfriend competing with Grant's sophisticated character, in His Girl Friday (1940). He portrayed detective Ellery Queen in a few films during the 1940s, but as his film career did not progress, he returned to the stage, where he continued to perform throughout the 1950s. Bellamy appeared in other movies during this time, including Dance, Girl, Dance (1940) with Maureen O'Hara and Lucille Ball, and the horror classic The Wolf Man (1941) with Lon Chaney Jr. and Evelyn Ankers. He also appeared in The Ghost of Frankenstein (1942) with Chaney and Bela Lugosi.

Bellamy appeared on Broadway as Franklin Delano Roosevelt in Sunrise at Campobello, winning a Tony Award for the role in 1957. He reprised the role in the 1960 film version.

In the summer of 1961, Bellamy hosted nine original episodes of Frontier Justice. In 1950, Bellamy became a member of The Lambs, an actors club located in New York.

Bellamy appeared in Death Valley Days ("The Vintage Years", 1962) as Daniel Quint, a minister. In the story, a young woman whom Quint befriends on a stagecoach ride, Lorna Erickson (Merry Anders), sets him up to be robbed by her paramour (William Bryant).

Highly regarded within the industry, Bellamy served four terms as the president of Actors' Equity from 1952 to 1964. On film, Bellamy starred in The Professionals (1966) as an oil tycoon, and in Roman Polanski's Rosemary's Baby (1968) as an evil physician. He turned to television during the 1970s. He played many roles in numerous shows, sometimes as a series regular. In 1970, he played the lead role of Ethan Arcane in the series The Most Deadly Game. Bellamy portrayed Adlai Stevenson in the TV movie The Missiles of October (1974), a treatment of the Cuban Missile Crisis. He was a member of the cast of the short-lived series Hunter in 1977.

An Emmy Award nomination for the mini-series The Winds of War (1983)—in which Bellamy reprised his Sunrise at Campobello role of Franklin D. Roosevelt—brought him back into the spotlight. This role was followed by his role as Randolph Duke, a conniving millionaire commodities trader in Trading Places (1983). The Eddie Murphy film Coming to America (1988) included a brief cameo by Bellamy and Don Ameche, reprising their roles as the Duke brothers. Around this time, he again portrayed Franklin Roosevelt in War and Remembrance (1988), the sequel to The Winds of War.

Among his later roles was an appearance as a once-brilliant but increasingly senile lawyer sadly skewered by Jimmy Smits' character on an episode of L.A. Law. Bellamy continued working regularly and gave his final performance in Pretty Woman (1990).

== Personal life ==
Throughout the 1930s and 1940s, Bellamy was seen socially with a select circle of friends known affectionately as the Irish Mafia, but they preferred the less sensational Boy's Club as its name. This group consisted of a group of Hollywood A-listers who were mainly of Irish descent (despite Bellamy having no Irish family connections). Others included James Cagney, Pat O'Brien, Spencer Tracy, Lynne Overman, Frank Morgan and Frank McHugh. Bellamy opened the Palm Springs Racquet Club in Palm Springs, California, with fellow actor Charles Farrell in 1934.

Bellamy was married four times: first to Alice Delbridge (1927–1930), then to Catherine Willard (1931–1945), then to organist Ethel Smith (1945–1947), and finally to Alice Murphy (1949–1991; his death).

A Democrat, Bellamy was in attendance at the 1960 Democratic National Convention in Los Angeles.

== Death ==
On November 29, 1991, Bellamy died from a lung ailment at Saint John's Health Center in Santa Monica, California. He was 87 years old.

== Awards and honors ==
In 1984, Bellamy was presented with a Life Achievement Award from the Screen Actors Guild, and in 1987, he received an Honorary Academy Award "for his unique artistry and his distinguished service to the profession of acting." Bellamy has a star on the Hollywood Walk of Fame at 6542 Hollywood Boulevard. In 1992, a Golden Palm Star on the Walk of Stars was dedicated to him.

In a 2007 episode of Boston Legal, footage of The Defender, a 1957 episode of Studio One, was used. The episode featured Bellamy and William Shatner as a father-and-son lawyer duo. This was used in the present day to explain the relationship between Shatner's Denny Crane character and his father in the show.

== Filmography ==
=== Film ===
Year	Title	Role	Notes
1931	The Secret Six	Johnny Franks	
1931	The Magnificent Lie	Bill Childers	
1931	West of Broadway	Mac, the Ranch Foreman	
1931	Surrender	Captain Ebbing	
1932	Forbidden	Holland	
1932	Disorderly Conduct	Captain Tom Manning	
1932	Young America	Judge Blake	
1932	The Woman in Room 13	John Bruce	
1932	Rebecca of Sunnybrook Farm	Dr. Ladd	
1932	Almost Married	Deene Maxwell	
1932	Wild Girl	Jack Marbury	
1932	Air Mail	Mike Miller	
1933	Second Hand Wife	Carter Cavendish	
1933	Parole Girl	Joseph B. 'Joe' Smith	
1933	Below the Sea	McCreary	
1933	Destination Unknown	Stowaway	
1933	Picture Snatcher	McLean	
1933	The Narrow Corner	Eric Whittenson	
1933	Flying Devils	'Speed' Hardy	
1933	Headline Shooter	Hal Caldwell	
1933	Blind Adventure	Jim Steele	
1933	Ace of Aces	Captain/Major Blake	
1933	Ever in My Heart	Jeff	
1933	Before Midnight	Inspector Steve Trent	
1934	Spitfire	George Fleetwood	
1934	Once to Every Woman	Dr. Barclay	
1934	This Man Is Mine	Jim Dunlap	
1934	The Crime of Helen Stanley	Inspector Steve Trent	
1934	One Is Guilty	Inspector Steve Trent	
1934	Girl in Danger	Inspector Steve Trent	
1934	Woman in the Dark	John Bradley	
1935	Helldorado	J.F. Van Avery	
1935	Rendezvous at Midnight	Commissioner Robert Edmonds	
1935	Gigolette	Terry Gallagher	
1935	The Wedding Night	Fredrik Sobieski	
1935	Eight Bells	Steve Andrews	
1935	Air Hawks	Barry Eldon	
1935	The Healer	Dr. Holden	
1935	Navy Wife	Dr. Quentin Harden	
1935	Hands Across the Table	Allen Macklyn	
1936	Dangerous Intrigue	Tony Halliday	
1936	Roaming Lady	Daniel S. 'Dan' Bailey	
1936	The Final Hour	John Vickery	
1936	Straight from the Shoulder	Curt Hayden	
1936	The Man Who Lived Twice	Dr. James Blake/'Slick' Rawley	
1936	Wild Brian Kent	Brian Kent	
1936	Counterfeit Lady	Johnny Pierce	
1937	Let's Get Married	Kirk Duncan	
1937	It Can't Last Forever	Russ Matthews	
1937	The Awful Truth	Daniel Leeson	
1938	The Crime of Dr. Hallet	Dr. Paul Hallet	
1938	Fools for Scandal	Phillip Chester	
1938	Boy Meets Girl	C. Elliott Friday	
1938	Carefree	Stephen Arden	
1938	Girls' School	Michael Hendragin	
1938	Trade Winds	Ben Blodgett	
1939	Smashing the Spy Ring	John Baxter	
1939	Let Us Live	Lieutenant Everett	
1939	Blind Alley	Dr. Shelby	
1939	Coast Guard	Lt. Raymond 'Ray' Dower	
1940	His Girl Friday	Bruce Baldwin	
1940	Flight Angels	Bill Graves	
1940	Brother Orchid	Clarence P. Fletcher	
1940	Queen of the Mob	FBI Agent Scott Langham	
1940	Dance, Girl, Dance	Steve Adams	
1940	Public Deb No. 1	Bruce Fairchild	
1940	Meet the Wildcat	Lt. Brad Williams	
1940	Ellery Queen, Master Detective	Ellery Queen	
1941	Footsteps in the Dark	Dr. Davis	
1941	Ellery Queen's Penthouse Mystery	Ellery Queen	
1941	Affectionately Yours	Owen Wright	
1941	Dive Bomber	Lance Rogers	
1941	Ellery Queen and the Perfect Crime	Ellery Queen	
1941	Ellery Queen and the Murder Ring	Ellery Queen	
1941	The Wolf Man	Colonel Montford	
1942	The Ghost of Frankenstein	Erik Ernst	
1942	Lady in a Jam	Stanley Gardner	
1942	Men of Texas	Major Lamphere	
1942	The Great Impersonation	Sir Edward Dominey / Baron Leopold von Ragenstein	
1943	Stage Door Canteen	Ralph Bellamy	
1944	Guest in the House	Douglas Proctor	
1945	Delightfully Dangerous	Arthur Hale	
1945	Lady on a Train	Jonathan Waring	
1955	The Court-Martial of Billy Mitchell	Congressman Frank R. Reid	
1960	Sunrise at Campobello	Franklin Delano Roosevelt	
1966	The Professionals	Grant	
1968	Rosemary's Baby	Dr. Abraham Sapirstein	
1971	Doctors' Wives	Jake Porter	
1972	Cancel My Reservation	John Ed	
1975	The Log of the Black Pearl	Captain Fitzsimmons	
1977	Oh, God!	Sam Raven	
1980	The Memory of Eva Ryker	William E. Ryker	
1983	Trading Places	Randolph Duke	
1983	The UnBob	Police Officer	
1983	Little House on the Prairie	Dr. Marvin Haynes	
1984	Terror in the Aisles	(Archival footage)	
1987	Disorderlies	Albert Dennison	
1987	Amazon Women on the Moon	Mr. Gower	Segment: "Titan Man"
1988	Coming to America	Randolph Duke	cameo
1988	The Good Mother	Frank, Grandfather	
1990	Pretty Woman	James Morse	

=== Television ===
Year	Title	Role	Notes
1949	Follow that Man	Leading Role: PI Mike Barnett	All Episodes: 1949-1954
1966	The F.B.I.	Captain Jennerson	episode: "The Death Wind"
1961	Rawhide	Judge Quince	S4:E4, "Judgment at Hondo Seco"
1961	Checkmate	Governor Tom Barker	episode: "Portrait of a Running Man"
1965	Rawhide	Marshal Hanson Dickson	S8:E9, "The Pursuit"
1967	The Invaders	Morgan Tate	episode: "The Condemned"
1967	Gunsmoke	Sheriff Bassett	episode: "Rope Fever"
1968	The F.B.I.	Dryden	episode: "The Butcher"
1968	The Virginian	Jeremiah	season 7 episode 01 (The saddle warmer)
1974	The Missiles of October	U.N. Ambassador Adlai Stevenson	television film
1976	Once an Eagle	Ed Caldwell	TV miniseries
1976	The Moneychangers	Jerome Patterton	TV miniseries
1976	The Boy in the Plastic Bubble	Dr. Huber	TV Movie
1977	The Bob Newhart Show	Professor Alan Dreeben	episode: "You're Fired, Mr. Chips"
1977	Testimony of Two Men	Dr. Jim Spaulding	TV miniseries
1978	Wheels	Lowell Baxter	TV miniseries
1980	Condominium	Lee Messenger	Television film
1984	The Winds of War	Franklin D. Roosevelt	TV miniseries
1984	The Love Boat	Harold Fleming	episode: Aerobic April/The Wager/Story of the Century
1986	The Twilight Zone	Emile Francis Bendictson	episode: "Monsters!"
1987	Matlock	Sen. Lambert Crawford	"The Power Brokers" parts 1 and 2 (season 2, episodes 5 and 6)
1988	War and Remembrance	Franklin D. Roosevelt	TV miniseries
1988	L.A. Law	August Redding	S2:E15, "The Bald Ones"
1989–1990	Christine Cromwell	Cyrus Blain	four episodes
2007	Boston Legal	Walter Crane	episode: "Son of the Defender" (posthumous role; archive footage)

=== Short subjects ===
- Screen Snapshots Series 15, No. 7 (1936)
- Screen Snapshots Series 16, No. 12 (1937)
- Breakdowns of 1938 (1938)
- What's My Line?, the "mystery guest" three times (in March 1952, January 1958 and September 1960)

=== Radio ===
Year	Program	Episode/source
1944	Lady Esther Screen Guild Theatre	Phantom Lady

== Bibliography ==
- Lamparski, Richard. Whatever Became Of ....? – Third Series. New York: Crown Publishers, Inc., 1970. ISBN 978-0-51750-443-7 .
- Maltin, Leonard. "Ralph Bellamy". Leonard Maltin's Movie Encyclopedia. New York: Dutton, 1994. ISBN 0-525-93635-1.
- Nieman, Greg. Palm Springs Legends: Creation of a Desert Oasis. San Diego, California: Sunbelt Publications, 2006. ISBN 978-0-932653-74-1.
- Rippingale, Sally Presley. The History of the Racquet Club of Palm Springs. Yucaipa, California: US Business Specialties, 1984. ISBN 978-0-932653-74-1.

== See also ==
- List of people from California
- List of people from Palm Springs, California
