= Public Opinion (1935 film) =

1935 film by Frank R. Strayer

- Directed by: Frank R. Strayer
- Written by: Karen DeWolf
- Produced by: Maury M. Cohen
- Starring: Lois Wilson; Crane Wilbur; Shirley Grey
- Cinematography: M.A. Anderson
- Edited by: Roland D. Reed
- Production company: Invincible Pictures
- Distributed by: Chesterfield Pictures
- Release date: March 15, 1935
- Running time: 71 minutes
- Country: United States
- Language: English

Public Opinion is a 1935 American drama film directed by Frank R. Strayer and starring Lois Wilson, Crane Wilbur and Shirley Grey.

== Plot ==
A scientist's obsessive jealousy about his wife, a professional opera singer, endangers their marriage.

== Cast ==
- Lois Wilson as Mona Trevor / Anne Trevor
- Crane Wilbur as Paul Arnold
- Shirley Grey as Joan Nash
- Luis Alberni as Caparini
- Andrés de Segurola as Enrico Martinelli
- Paul Ellis as Carlos Duran
- Ronnie Cosby as Tommy Arnold
- Florence Roberts as Mrs. Buttons
- Gertrude Sutton as Martha, the Maid
- Erville Alderson as Mr. Trevor
- Edward Keane as Paul's Attorney
- Mildred Gover as Maid
- Edward LeSaint as Judge
- Richard Carlyle as Dr. Rand

== Bibliography ==
- Michael R. Pitts. Poverty Row Studios, 1929–1940: An Illustrated History of 55 Independent Film Companies, with a Filmography for Each. McFarland & Company, 2005.
