= Daring Danger (1932 film) =

1932 film

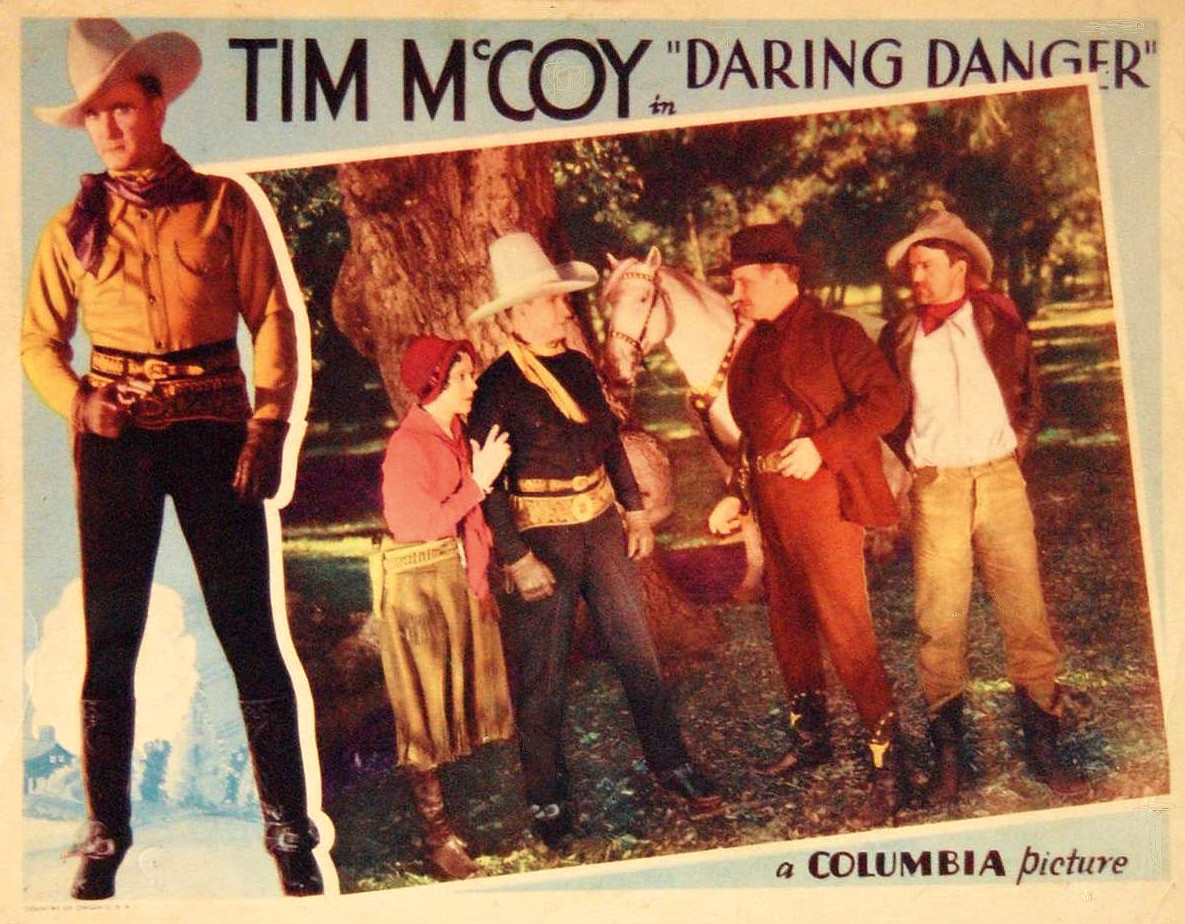
- Lobby card
- Directed by: D. Ross Lederman
- Written by: Michael Trevellian; William Colt MacDonald
- Starring: Tim McCoy; Alberta Vaughn; Wallace MacDonald
- Cinematography: Benjamin H. Kline
- Edited by: Otto Meyer
- Distributed by: Columbia Pictures Corporation
- Release date: July 27, 1932
- Running time: 57 minutes
- Country: United States
- Language: English

Daring Danger is a 1932 American pre-Code Western directed by D. Ross Lederman.

== Plot ==
Tim Madigan (Tim McCoy), a cowboy coming to the aid of Gerry Norris (Alberta Vaughn), whose father (Murdock MacQuarrie) is in trouble with a gang of cattle rustlers. The leaders of the rustlers, Hugo Distang (Robert Ellis) and Bull Bagley (Richard Alexander), prove to be the very same villains Madigan was trailing.

== Cast ==
- Tim McCoy as Tim Madigan
- Alberta Vaughn as 'Gerry' Norris
- Wallace MacDonald as Jughandle
- Robert Ellis as Hugo DuSang
- Richard Alexander as Bull Bagley
- Murdock MacQuarrie as 'Pa' Norris
- Vernon Dent as Bartender Pee Wee
- Edward LeSaint as First Ranch Owner
