= Find the Blackmailer =

1943 film

- Directed by: D. Ross Lederman
- Written by: Robert E. Kent; G. T. Fleming-Roberts
- Produced by: William Jacobs
- Starring: Jerome Cowan; Faye Emerson
- Cinematography: James Van Trees
- Edited by: Harold McLernon
- Production company: Warner Bros. Pictures
- Distributed by: Warner Bros. Pictures
- Release date: November 6, 1943
- Running time: 55 minutes
- Country: United States
- Language: English
- Budget: $81,000
- Box office: $307,000

Find the Blackmailer is a 1943 American crime film directed by D. Ross Lederman. According to Warner Bros records the film earned $230,000 domestic and $77,000 foreign.

== Cast ==
- Jerome Cowan as D. L. Trees
- Faye Emerson as Mona Vance
- Gene Lockhart as John M. Rhodes
- Marjorie Hoshelle as Pandora Pines
- Robert Kent as Mark Harper
- Wade Boteler as Detective Lieutenant Cramer
- John Harmon as Ray Hickey
- Bradley Page as Mitch Farrell
- Lou Lubin as Mr. Olen
- Ralph Peters as Mr. Coleman

== Home media ==
In 2010, the film was released by Warner Archive as part of the six-film DVD-R collection Warner Bros. Horror/Mystery Double Features.
