= Hold the Press =

1933 film

- Directed by: Phil Rosen
- Written by: Horace McCoy
- Starring: Tim McCoy; Shirley Grey; Wheeler Oakman
- Cinematography: Benjamin Kline
- Edited by: Otto Meyer
- Production company: Columbia Pictures
- Release date: October 25, 1933 (US)
- Running time: 63 minutes
- Country: United States
- Language: English

Hold the Press is a 1933 American pre-Code crime drama film, directed by Phil Rosen. It stars Tim McCoy, Shirley Grey, and Wheeler Oakman, and was released on October 25, 1933.

== Cast ==
- Tim McCoy as Tim Collins
- Shirley Grey as Edith White
- Wheeler Oakman as Abbott
- Henry Wadsworth as Frankie White
- Oscar Apfel as Bishop
- Bradley Page as Mike Sereno
- Jack Long as Abbott's secretary
- Samuel S. Hinds as Taylor
