= Midnight Limited =

- Theatrical release poster
- Directed by: Howard Bretherton
- Screenplay by: Harrison Carter; Charles Williams
- Produced by: T.R. Williams
- Starring: John 'Dusty' King; Marjorie Reynolds; George Cleveland; Edward Keane; Monte Collins; I. Stanford Jolley
- Cinematography: Harry Neumann
- Edited by: Russell F. Schoengarth
- Production company: Monogram Pictures
- Distributed by: Monogram Pictures
- Release date: March 20, 1940
- Running time: 62 minutes
- Country: United States
- Language: English

Midnight Limited is a 1940 American mystery film directed by Howard Bretherton and written by Harrison Carter and Charles Williams. The film stars John 'Dusty' King, Marjorie Reynolds, George Cleveland, Edward Keane, Monte Collins and I. Stanford Jolley. It was released on March 20, 1940 by Monogram Pictures.

== Plot ==
Full film (public domain)

== Cast ==
- John 'Dusty' King as Val Lennon
- Marjorie Reynolds as Joan Marshall
- George Cleveland as Prof. Van Dillon
- Edward Keane as Capt. Harrigan
- Monte Collins as Abel Krantz
- I. Stanford Jolley as Frenchie
- Pat Flaherty as Train Conductor
- Herbert Ashley as Trainman
- Lita Chevret as Mae Krantz
