= Before Midnight (1933 film) =

1933 film

- Directed by: Lambert Hillyer
- Screenplay by: Robert Quigley
- Produced by: Irving Briskin
- Starring: Ralph Bellamy; June Collyer br>Claude Gillingwater
- Cinematography: John Stumar
- Edited by: Otto Meyer
- Production company: Columbia Pictures
- Distributed by: Columbia Pictures
- Release date: November 18, 1933
- Running time: 63 minutes
- Country: United States
- Language: English

Before Midnight is a 1933 American pre-Code mystery crime film directed by Lambert Hillyer and starring Ralph Bellamy, June Collyer and Claude Gillingwater. Produced and distributed by Columbia Pictures, it was the first in a series of four films featuring Inspector Steve Trent of the NYPD. Bellamy featured in all three sequels One Is Guilty, The Crime of Helen Stanley and Girl in Danger.

== Plot ==
NYC Police Inspector Steve Trent is called to the estate of wealthy Edward Arnold around sixty miles outside NYC on a stormy night. Arnold has had a premonition that he is going to be murdered that night.

== Cast ==
- Ralph Bellamy as Police Inspector Steve Trent
- June Collyer as Janet Holt
- Claude Gillingwater as John Fry
- Bradley Page as Howard B. Smith
- Betty Blythe as Mavis Fry
- Arthur Pierson as Dr. David R. Marsh
- George Cooper as Stubby
- William Jeffrey as Edward Arnold
- Joseph Crehan as Police Capt. Frank Flynn
- Otto Yamaoka as Kono
- Kit Guard as Jack
- Bob Kortman as Plainclothesman
- Edward LeSaint as Harry Graham
- Fred 'Snowflake' Toones as Taxi Driver

== Bibliography ==
- Backer, Ron. Mystery Movie Series of 1930s Hollywood. McFarland, 2012.
