= The Frame-Up =

1937 film

- Directed by: D. Ross Lederman
- Written by: Richard Wormser; Harold Shumate
- Starring: Paul Kelly
- Cinematography: Benjamin Kline
- Edited by: Otto Meyer
- Distributed by: Columbia Pictures
- Release date: May 2, 1937
- Running time: 59 minutes
- Country: United States
- Language: English

The Frame-Up is a 1937 American crime film directed by D. Ross Lederman.

== Cast ==
- Paul Kelly as Mark MacArthur
- Julie Bishop as Betty Lindale (as Jacqueline Wells)
- George McKay as Joe Lavery
- Robert Emmett O'Connor as Larry Mann aka John Mench
- Ray Bennett as Franey Forrester (as Raphael Bennett)
- Wade Boteler as Police Captain Donovan
- Edward Earle as Ellery Richards
- C. Montague Shaw as James (J.R.) Weston
- John Tyrrell as Soapy Connor (as Johnny Tyrrell)
- Ted Oliver as Spud Gitale
- Horace Murphy as Dr. Phillips
