= One Man Law =

1931 film by Lambert Hillyer

- Directed by: Lambert Hillyer
- Written by: Lambert Hillyer
- Starring: Buck Jones; Shirley Grey; Robert Ellis
- Cinematography: Mack Stengler
- Edited by: Harry Marker
- Production company: Columbia Pictures
- Distributed by: Columbia Pictures
- Release date: December 4, 1931
- Running time: 61 minutes
- Country: United States
- Language: English

One Man Law is a 1931 American pre-Code Western film directed by Lambert Hillyer. The film stars Buck Jones, Shirley Grey, and Robert Ellis. It was produced and distributed by Columbia Pictures. It was filmed on location at the Walker Ranch in Placerita Canyon.

== Plot ==
A sheriff finds out about a real-estate scam and stops it.

== Cast ==
- Buck Jones as Brand Thompson
- Shirley Grey as Grace Duncan
- Robert Ellis as Jonathan P. Streeter
- Murdock Mcquarrie as Grimm
- Harry Todd as Hank
- Henry Sedley as Dye
- Ernie Adams as Stubb
- Richard Alexander as Sorenson
