= Harold Shumate =

American screenwriter (1893–1983)

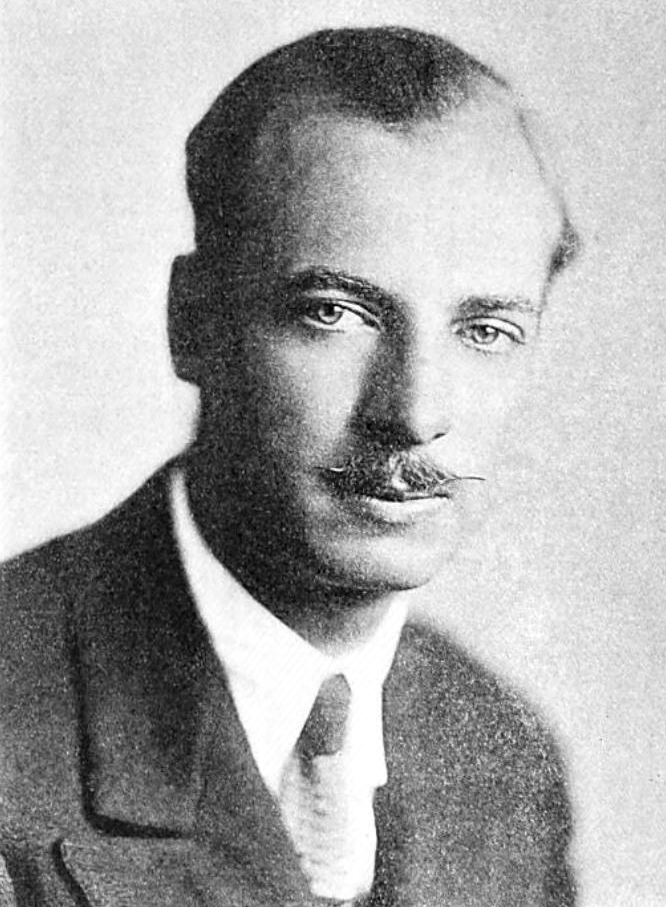
- Born: September 7, 1893; Austin, Texas, US
- Died: August 5, 1983 (aged 89); Thousand Oaks, California, US
- Occupation: Screenwriter
- Years active: 1917–1954

Harold Shumate (September 7, 1893 – August 5, 1983) was an American screenwriter. He wrote for 100 films between 1917 and 1954. He was born in Austin, Texas and died in Thousand Oaks, California on August 5, 1983.

== Selected filmography ==
- Fighting Back (1917)
- Hitchin' Posts (1920)
- The White Sin (1924)
- Sealed Lips (1925)
- Miss Brewster's Millions (1926)
- Meet the Prince (1926)
- The Wrong Mr. Wright (1927)
- The Rose of Kildare (1927)
- The Tigress (1927)
- After the Storm (1928)
- The River Woman (1928)
- United States Smith (1928)
- The Head of the Family (1928)
- San Francisco Nights (1928)
- Companionate Marriage (1928) (unconfirmed co-director with Erle C. Kenton)
- Hold Your Man (1929)
- The Voice of the Storm (1929)
- Heritage of the Desert (1932)
- Ridin' for Justice (1932)
- High Speed (1932)
- The Crime of Helen Stanley (1934)
- Hell Bent for Love (1934)
- A Man's Game (1934)
- One Is Guilty (1934)
- Beyond the Law (1934)
- Girl in Danger (1934)
- Against the Law (1934)
- Square Shooter (1935)
- Super Speed (1935)
- Behind the Evidence (1935)
- Hell-Ship Morgan (1936)
- Pride of the Marines (1936)
- Panic on the Air (1936)
- The Final Hour (1936)
- Counterfeit Lady (1936)
- End of the Trail (1936)
- Killer at Large (1936)
- Counsel for Crime (1937)
- The Frame-Up (1937)
- The Main Event (1938)
- Man of Conquest (1939)
- Cafe Hostess (1940)
- Trail of the Vigilantes (1940)
- The Man with Nine Lives (1940)
- The Forest Rangers (1942)
- Buccaneer's Girl (1950)
- Saddle Tramp (1950)
- Pride of the Blue Grass (1954)
