= Branded (1931 film) =

1931 film

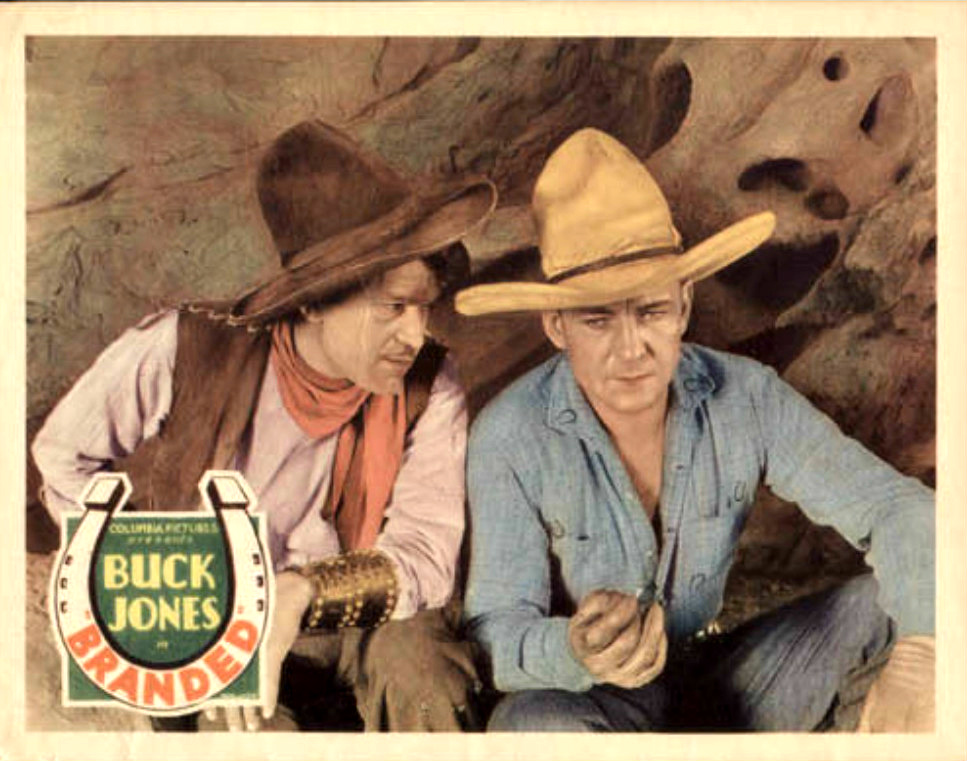
- Lobby card
- Directed by: D. Ross Lederman
- Written by: Randall Faye
- Produced by: Harry Cohn
- Starring: Buck Jones; Ethel Kenyon; Wallace MacDonald
- Cinematography: Elmer Dyer; Benjamin H. Kline
- Edited by: Otto Meyer; Gene Milford
- Distributed by: Columbia Pictures Corporation
- Release date: September 1, 1931
- Running time: 61 minutes
- Country: United States
- Language: English

Branded is a 1931 American pre-Code Western film directed by D. Ross Lederman.

== Plot ==
Dale and sidekick 'Swede' break up a stage robbery only to be arrested for the robbery. Escaping to a new town they make an enemy of Moore.

== Cast ==
- Buck Jones as Cuthbert Chauncy Dale
- Ethel Kenyon as Lou Preston
- Wallace MacDonald as Stage Robber (as Wallace McDonald)
- Philo McCullough as Mac - Fall City Sheriff
- Albert J. Smith as Joe Moore (as Al Smith)
- [John Oscar as Ole 'Swede' Swenson
- Clark Burroughs as Mr. Preston
- Fred Burns as Prestonville Sheriff
