= One Is Guilty =

1934 film

- Directed by: Lambert Hillyer
- Written by: Harold Shumate
- Produced by: Irving Briskin
- Starring: Ralph Bellamy; Shirley Grey; Rita La Roy
- Cinematography: John Stumar
- Production company: Columbia Pictures
- Distributed by: Columbia Pictures
- Release date: March 31, 1934
- Running time: 63 minutes
- Country: United States
- Language: English

One Is Guilty is a 1934 American pre-Code mystery crime film directed by Lambert Hillyer and starring Ralph Bellamy, Shirley Grey and Rita La Roy. It is the second in a series of four films featuring Bellamy as Inspector Steve Trent following Before Midnight. Two further films, The Crime of Helen Stanley and Girl in Danger, were released later in the year.

== Plot ==
The body of a championboxer is found in an apartment complex. Various suspects appear to have had the opportunity and the motive to kill the fighter.

== Cast ==
- Ralph Bellamy as Police Inspector Steve Trent
- Shirley Grey as Sally Grey
- Warren Hymer as 'Knock-Out' Walters
- Rita La Roy as Lola Deveroux
- J. Carrol Naish as Jack Allen
- Wheeler Oakman as Toledo Eddie Marchetti
- Ruth Abbott as Miss Mabel Kane
- Willard Robertson as Wells Deveroux
- Ralph Remley as 'Pop' Daley
- Vincent Sherman as William Malcolm
- Harry Todd as Danny O'Keefe
- Sam Flint as Coroner

== Bibliography ==
- Backer, Ron. Mystery Movie Series of 1930s Hollywood. McFarland, 2012.
