= Circumstantial Evidence (1935 film) =

1935 film by Charles Lamont

- Directed by: Charles Lamont
- Written by: Ewart Adamson; Tom Terriss
- Produced by: George R. Batcheller
- Starring: Chick Chandler; Shirley Grey; Arthur Vinton
- Cinematography: M.A. Anderson
- Edited by: Roland D. Reed
- Production company: Chesterfield Pictures
- Distributed by: Chesterfield Pictures
- Release date: March 30, 1935
- Running time: 67 minutes
- Country: United States
- Language: English

Circumstantial Evidence is a 1935 drama film directed by Charles Lamont and starring Chick Chandler, Shirley Grey and Arthur Vinton.

== Cast ==
- Chick Chandler as James Richard 'Jim' Baldwin
- Shirley Grey as Adrienne Grey
- Arthur Vinton as Fred Stevens
- Claude King as Ralph Winters
- Dorothy Revier as Bernice Winters
- Lee Moran as Spike Horton
- Carl Stockdale as George Malone
- Eddie Phillips as Harris
- Edward Keane as Judge Samuels
- Robert Frazer as District Attorney
- Huntley Gordon as The Governor
- Lew Kelly as Detective Taylor
- Barbara Bedford as Mrs. Goodwin
- Al Bridge as John Cassidy
- Don Brodie as The Bailiff
- Ralph Brooks as Joe
- Eddy Chandler as Prison Guard Henderson
- Phyllis Crane as A Dumb Dame
- Charles Doretya s Prison Guard
- Robert Elliott as Detective Brown
- Henry Hall as Prison Warden
- Lloyd Ingraham as Judge Robertson
- Charles McAvoy as Prison Guard Kelly
- Lafe McKee as Jury Foreman
- Spec O'Donnell as Sydney
- Rose Plumer as Member of the Jury
- Al Thompson as Mosher

== Bibliography ==
- Michael R. Pitts. Poverty Row Studios, 1929–1940: An Illustrated History of 55 Independent Film Companies, with a Filmography for Each. McFarland & Company, 2005.
