= Vincent Sherman =

American film director (1906–2006)

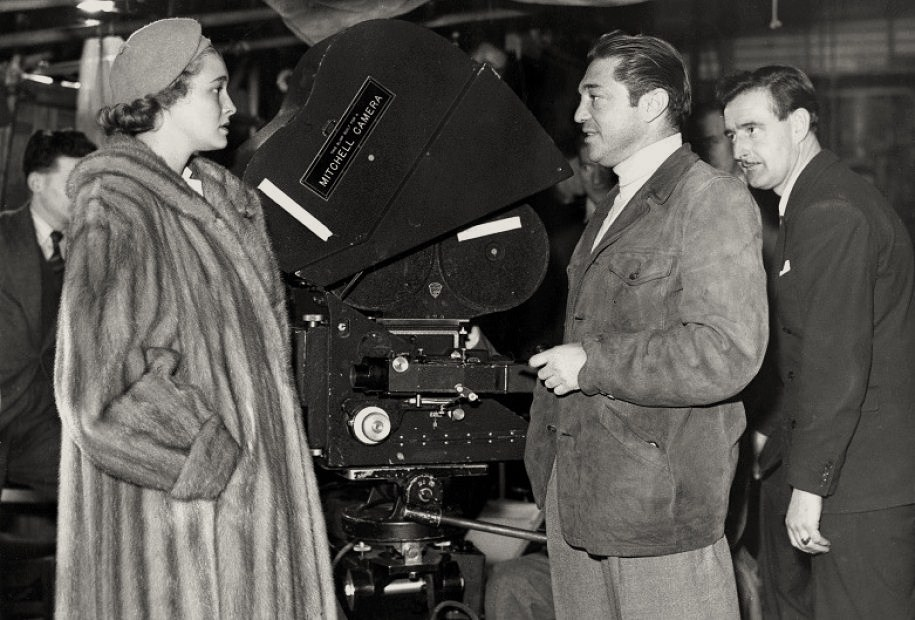
- On set of The Hasty Heart (1949), L–R: Patricia Neal, Vincent Sherman and Wilkie Cooper (cinematographer)
- Born: Abraham Orovitz; July 16, 1906; Vienna, Georgia, USA
- Died: June 18, 2006 (aged 99); Los Angeles, California
- Years active: 1928–1983
- Spouse: Hedda Comorau (1931–1984; her death)
- Children: 2
- Website: www.vincentsherman.com

Vincent Sherman (born Abraham Orovitz, July 16, 1906 – June 18, 2006) was an American director and actor who worked in Hollywood. His movies include Mr. Skeffington (1944), Nora Prentiss (1947), and The Young Philadelphians (1959).

He began his career as an actor on Broadway and later in film. He directed B-movies for Warner Bros. and then moved to directing to A-pictures. He was a good friend of actor Errol Flynn, whom he directed in Adventures of Don Juan (1949). He directed three Joan Crawford movies: The Damned Don't Cry (1950), Harriet Craig (1950), and Goodbye, My Fancy (1951).

== Early life ==
Sherman was born Abraham Orovitz to Jewish parents. He was born and raised in the small town of Vienna, Georgia, where his father was a dry-goods salesman. Not long after graduating from Oglethorpe University in Atlanta, he became a professional actor.

== Career ==
Sherman arrived in New York City to sell a play and soon became a stage director and actor. As a stage actor, he made his Broadway debut in the ensemble of Eugene O’Neill’s Marco Millions (1928). He arrived in Hollywood during the early sound era, where he appeared in William Wyler's 1933 film Counsellor at Law starring John Barrymore. In 1938, Sherman signed on at Warner Bros. as a director. His first film as a director was the 1939 horror film The Return of Doctor X, which starred Humphrey Bogart. The 2006 release of The Return of Doctor X included a director's commentary that Sherman had recorded that year at the age of 99.

Sherman quickly built a reputation for his ability to rewrite any script he was given and turn it into the basis for a successful film. It was these skills that led him to much bigger and star-studded pictures. Sherman was initially known as a "woman's director" during the mid 1940s, but his range expanded as his career developed.

After his film career wound up, Sherman ended his career in television. In 2004, he was the oldest of 21 individuals interviewed in the documentary film Imaginary Witness, a work that chronicled 60 years of film-making about the Holocaust.

== Personal life ==
Sherman was married to Hedda (née Comorau) from 1931 until her death in 1984. The Shermans had two children together, a son, Eric Sherman, and a daughter, Hedwin Naimark.

Sherman had a number of high-profile affairs during his life, including on-set affairs with Bette Davis and a three-year relationship with Joan Crawford. In his memoir Studio Affairs: My Life as a Film Director, he described his relationships with Crawford and Rita Hayworth. Until his death in 2006, he had been in a decade-long relationship with actress Francine York.

== Death ==
Sherman died on June 18, 2006, at age 99, at the Motion Picture and Television Country House and Hospital in Woodland Hills, California.

== Filmography ==
=== Director (feature film) ===
| Year | Title | Notes |
|---|---|---|
| 1939 | The Return of Doctor X | |
| 1940 | Saturday's Children | |
| 1940 | The Man Who Talked Too Much | |
| 1941 | Flight from Destiny | |
| 1941 | Underground | |
| 1942 | All Through the Night | |
| 1942 | Across the Pacific | |
| 1943 | The Hard Way | |
| 1943 | Old Acquaintance | |
| 1943 | The Present with a Future | Short film |
| 1944 | In Our Time | |
| 1944 | Mr. Skeffington | |
| 1945 | Pillow to Post | |
| 1946 | Janie Gets Married | |
| 1947 | Nora Prentiss | |
| 1947 | The Unfaithful | |
| 1948 | Adventures of Don Juan | Alternative title: The New Adventures of Don Juan |
| 1949 | The Hasty Heart | |
| 1950 | Backfire | |
| 1950 | The Damned Don't Cry | |
| 1950 | Harriet Craig | |
| 1951 | Goodbye, My Fancy | |
| 1952 | Lone Star | |
| 1952 | Affair in Trinidad | |
| 1957 | The Garment Jungle | |
| 1958 | The Naked Earth | |
| 1959 | The Young Philadelphians | |
| 1960 | Ice Palace | |
| 1961 | A Fever in the Blood | |
| 1961 | The Second Time Around | |
| 1967 | Cervantes | Alternative title: Young Rebel |

=== Actor ===
| Year | Title | Role | Notes |
|---|---|---|---|
| 1933 | Counsellor at Law | Harry Becker | |
| 1934 | Speed Wings | Mickey | |
| 1934 | The Crime of Helen Stanley | Karl Williams | |
| 1934 | One Is Guilty | William Malcolm | |
| 1934 | Hell Bent for Love | Johnny Frank | |
| 1934 | Midnight Alibi | Black Mike | |
| 1934 | Girl in Danger | Willie Tolini | |
