= Virtue (film) =

1932 film

- Directed by: Edward Buzzell
- Screenplay by: Robert Riskin
- Story by: Ethel Hill
- Produced by: Harry Cohn
- Starring: Carole Lombard; Pat O'Brien; Shirley Grey
- Cinematography: Joseph Walker
- Edited by: Maurice Wright
- Production company: Columbia Pictures
- Distributed by: Columbia Pictures
- Release date: October 25, 1932
- Running time: 69 minutes
- Country: United States
- Language: English

Virtue is a 1932 American Pre-Code romantic drama film directed by Edward Buzzell and starring Carole Lombard, Pat O'Brien and Shirley Grey. It was produced and distributed by Columbia Pictures.

== Plot ==
New York City streetwalker Mae (Carole Lombard) is told by police to leave New York. However, she gets off the train at a suburban station, taking the cab of Jimmy Doyle (Pat O'Brien). He says he knows women well and does not think much of them. She slips away without paying the fare, as she is penniless. Fellow prostitute Lil (Mayo Methot) advises her to find honest work.

Receiving a loan, Mae goes to pay Jimmy the fare. They argue, but are mutually attracted and he finds her a job. By coincidence, Gert (Shirley Grey), another ex prostitute, also works there. Jimmy and Mae marry, but Mae has not told him about her past. When a policeman appears to arrest Mae for breaking bail conditions, Jimmy leaves to think things over. He then says he will try to make the marriage work, on condition that Mae has given up prostitution and avoids her old friends.

Jimmy has saved money to become a partner in a gas station. When Gert asks for money for a doctor, Mae takes it from Jimmy's savings. She learns Gert has lied and, when Jimmy tells her he will need the money, Mae finds Gert who promises to get her it. However, Gert has given the money to her boyfriend Toots (Jack La Rue), who is also Lil's pimp. When Gert tries to steal it back from him, Toots catches her and accidentally kills her. He hides the body, then watches from hiding as Mae shows up; she finds the money and leaves.

The police arrest Mae because she left her bag in Gert's apartment. However, a mistrustful Jimmy had been following Mae and knows a man was with Gert. He learns that it was Toots, but Lil gives Toots an alibi. Lil convinces Toots to go to the DA's office and lodge a complaint against Jimmy, but when they are there she rats Toots out for the murder of Gert. Toots is taken into custody and Mae is exonerated.

== Cast ==
- Carole Lombard as Mae
- Pat O'Brien as Jimmy
- Ward Bond as Frank
- Shirley Grey as Gert
- Mayo Methot as Lil
- Jack La Rue as Toots
- Willard Robertson as MacKenzie
- Lew Kelly as Magistrate
- Fred Santley as Hank
- Arthur Wanzer as Flanagan
- Jessie Arnold as Landlady
- Edwin Stanley as District Attorney

== Bibliography ==
- Dick, Bernard F. The Merchant Prince of Poverty Row: Harry Cohn of Columbia Pictures. University Press of Kentucky, 2015.
- Kendall, Elizabeth. The Runaway Bride: Hollywood Romantic Comedy of the 1930s. Cooper Square Press, 2002.
