= John Stumar =

Hungarian-American cinematographer (1892–1962)

- Born: John S. Stumar; May 30, 1892; Budapest, Hungary
- Died: October 27, 1962 (aged 70); Los Angeles, California (United States)
- Other names: John M. Stumar; John S. Stumar
- Years active: 1917-1947

John Stumar (30 May 1892 – 27 October 1962) was a Hungarian-American cinematographer. He was a brother of cinematographer Charles J. Stumar. He worked as a cinematographer on 130 films between 1917 and 1947.

== Selected filmography ==
- The Vamp (1918)
- A Burglar for a Night (1918)
- Prisoners of the Pines (1918)
- The Marriage Ring (1918)
- Quicksand (1918)
- Hard Boiled (1919)
- Black Is White (1920)
- The Song of the Soul (1920)
- Pardon My French (1921)
- Anne of Little Smoky (1921)
- Cardigan (1922)
- Blaze Away (1922)
- The Kingdom Within (1922)
- The Super-Sex (1922)
- Dollar Devils (1923)
- Temporary Marriage (1923)
- A Lady of Quality (1924)
- The Family Secret (1924)
- The Tornado (1924)
- Fifth Avenue Models (1925)
- The Love Thief (1926)
- Down the Stretch (1927)
- The Claw (1927)
- Wild Beauty (1927)
- 13 Washington Square (1928)
- Home, James (1928)
- Second Choice (1930)
- Left Over Ladies (1931)
- Above the Clouds (1933)
- Fury of the Jungle (1933)
- Before Midnight (1933)
- The Most Precious Thing in Life (1934)
- Name the Woman (1934)
- One Is Guilty (1934)
- The Unwelcome Stranger (1935)
- The Best Man Wins (1935)
- Devil's Squadron (1936)
- End of the Trail (1936)
- Counterfeit (1936)
- Intimate Relations (1937)
- Parents on Trial (1939)
- The Secret Seven (1940)
- The Lone Wolf Takes a Chance (1941)
- Two Latins from Manhattan (1941)
- Tramp, Tramp, Tramp (1942)
- Caribbean Enchantment (1947)
