= The Public Menace =

1935 film by Erle C. Kenton

- Directed by: Erle C. Kenton
- Written by: Ethel Hill; Lionel Houser
- Starring: Jean Arthur; George Murphy; Douglass Dumbrille
- Cinematography: Henry Freulich
- Edited by: Gene Milford
- Production company: Columbia Pictures
- Distributed by: Columbia Pictures
- Release date: September 24, 1935 (New York)
- Running time: 72-73 minutes
- Country: United States
- Language: English

The Public Menace is a 1935 American black-and-white romantic drama film starring Jean Arthur, George Murphy and Douglass Dumbrille. A newspaper reporter keeps losing and regaining his job due to a manicurist he is persuaded to marry.

== Plot ==
"Red" Foster (George Murphy) and other reporters board an ocean liner arriving from Europe. Red has been sent to cover a seemingly routine suicide. Cassie (Jean Arthur), the ship's manicurist, is homesick for America, but has somehow become a Greek citizen and not American. The captain (Thurston Hall) becomes aware of her plan to jump ship, and tells her she will be watched closely. She tells Red that she has a suicide note that reveals that man held by the police for a sensational murder is innocent and names the true killer. However, she will only give it to him if he marries her and makes her an American citizen again. He reluctantly agrees, and the captain marries them. Afterward, however, he learns that she has lied; the note is merely a letter of recommendation.

Meanwhile, the other reporters learn that notorious gangster Tonelli (Douglass Dumbrille) is being brought back to the United States to face a number of charges. When they locate his cabin, they barge in on him and his police escorts. Then they are all forced at gunpoint by Tonelli's henchman to help in his escape. The reporters do not mind, as they have a great front-page story for their newspapers. All that is, except Red. Frentrup (Robert Middlemass), Red's city editor, fires him for missing it.

Neither Red nor Cassie have any money, so he lets her stay at his apartment. They find new jobs and save money for their divorce, though Cassie does her best to get Red to change his mind about splitting up.

When Cassie reads about two dead gangsters who have been burned too badly to be identified, she hits upon a scheme to get Red his old job back. She telephones Frentrup and claims to be able to identify one as Tonelli by a tattoo mentioned in the newspaper, but insists on talking only to Red. Frentrup reinstates the reporter.

However, Tonelli is still alive, and when he discovers that his girlfriend, Mimi (Shirley Grey), has quickly found herself another man, he guns them down in cold blood. Before he dies, the man is able to tell the police that Tonelli is responsible. Red gets fired again.

Cassie is taken in to be interrogated on suspicion that she is Tonelli's accomplice. The police allow Cassie to be released on bail, in the hope that she will lead them to the fugitive. Tonelli does indeed send for her. When he realizes the block is surrounded by policemen, Cassie persuades him to let her call her "brother" (actually Red) and have him bring "his" ambulance, so the gangster can try to sneak out on a stretcher. The plan works, except Cassie and Red take him not to a new hideout, but to Red's newspaper. Trapped, Tonelli starts shooting and is killed by the police. In the middle of the gunfight, Frentrup once again rehires Red to write the unfolding story.

At the divorce court, Red decides to stay married to Cassie.

== Cast ==
- Jean Arthur as Cassie Nicholls
- George Murphy as Edward "Red" Foster
- Douglass Dumbrille as Tonelli
- George McKay as Dildy
- Robert Middlemass as Frentrup
- Victor Kilian as Joe
- Charles C. Wilson as Detective #1
- Gene Morgan as Cox
- Murray Alper as Stiglitz
- Shirley Grey as Mimi
- Bradley Page as Louie
- Arthur Rankin as Tommy
- Thurston Hall as Captain of ocean liner
- Fred Kelsey as Mike

== Home media ==
The film is available on DVD as part of the Jean Arthur Comedy Collection, released by Sony Pictures Home Entertainment.
