= Against the Law (1934 film) =

1934 film

- Directed by: Lambert Hillyer
- Written by: Harold Shumate
- Produced by: Irving Briskin
- Starring: Johnny Mack Brown; Sally Blane; Arthur Hohl
- Cinematography: Allen G. Siegler
- Edited by: Otto Meyer
- Production company: Columbia Pictures
- Distributed by: Columbia Pictures
- Release date: October 25, 1934
- Running time: 61 minutes
- Country: United States
- Language: English

Against the Law is a 1934 American crime drama film directed by Lambert Hillyer and starring Johnny Mack Brown, Sally Blane and Arthur Hohl. It was produced and distributed by Columbia Pictures.

== Plot ==
Los Angeles ambulance driver Steve is a rival with his friend Bill, a doctor, for the romantic attentions of nurse Martha Gray. However, when he discovers that Bill has become ensnared by racketeers over gambling debts, he sets out to battle the mob.

== Cast ==
- Johnny Mack Brown as Steve Wayne
- Sally Blane as Martha Gray
- Arthur Hohl as Kelly
- George Meeker as Bert Andrews
- James Bush as Bill Barrie
- Bradley Page as Mike Eagan
- Ward Bond as Tony Rizzo
- Hooper Atchley as O'Brien
- Al Hill as Reardon
- Joseph Crehan as Capt. Elliott

== Bibliography ==
- Fetrow, Alan G. . Sound films, 1927-1939: a United States Filmography. McFarland, 1992.
- Hanson, Patricia King. The American Film Institute Catalog of Motion Pictures Produced in the United States: Feature Films, 1931-1940, Volumes 1-3. University of California Press, 1993.
