= Out All Night (1933 film) =

1933 film by Sam Taylor

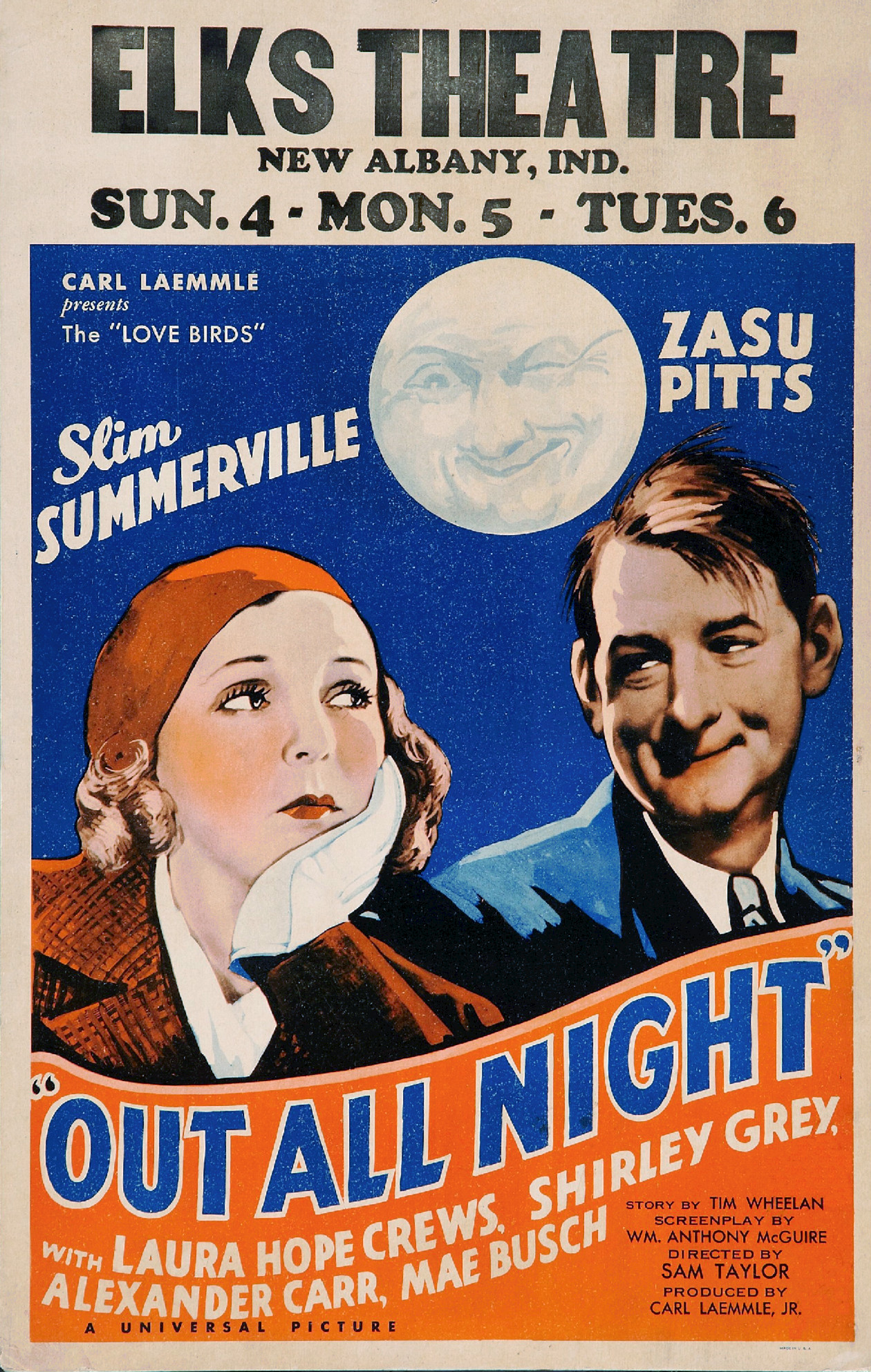
- Theatrical release poster
- Directed by: Sam Taylor
- Screenplay by: William Anthony McGuire
- Story by: Tim Whelan
- Produced by: Carl Laemmle, Jr.
- Starring: Slim Summerville; ZaSu Pitts; Laura Hope Crews; Shirley Grey
- Cinematography: Jerome Ash
- Edited by: Bernard W. Burton
- Music by: David Klatzkin
- Production company: Universal Pictures
- Distributed by: Universal Pictures
- Release date: April 8, 1933
- Running time: 68 minutes
- Country: United States
- Language: English

Out All Night is a 1933 American pre-Code comedy film directed by Sam Taylor and written by William Anthony McGuire. The film stars Slim Summerville, ZaSu Pitts, Laura Hope Crews, Shirley Grey, Alexander Carr and Rollo Lloyd. The film was released April 8, 1933, by Universal Pictures.

== Plot ==
A mama's boy falls for a spinster who works at a nursery in a department store.

== Cast ==
- Slim Summerville as Ronald Colgate
- ZaSu Pitts as Bunny
- Laura Hope Crews as Mrs. Jane Colgate
- Shirley Grey as Kate
- Alexander Carr as Mr. Rosemountain
- Rollo Lloyd as David Arnold
- Billy Barty as Child
- Edward Peil Jr. as Eddie
- Shirley Temple as Child
- Philip Purdy as Child
- Gene Lewis as Tracy
