= Hell Bent for Love =

1934 film

- Film poster
- Directed by: D. Ross Lederman
- Written by: Harold Shumate
- Starring: Tim McCoy
- Distributed by: Columbia Pictures
- Release date: May 19, 1934
- Running time: 65 minutes
- Country: United States
- Language: English

Hell Bent for Love is a 1934 American Pre-Code crime film directed by D. Ross Lederman and starring Tim McCoy and Lilian Bond.

== Cast ==
- Tim McCoy as Police Captain Tim Daley
- Lilian Bond as Millicent 'Millie' Garland
- Bradley Page as 'Trigger' Talano
- Vincent Sherman as Johnny Frank
- Lafe McKee as Dad Daley
- Harry C. Bradley as Professor
- Wedgwood Nowell as Attorney Kelly Drake
- Eddie Sturgis as Major Dawson
- Ernie Adams as Henchman Joe Barnard
- Hal Price as Duke Allen
- Max Wagner as Ernest Dallas
- Guy Usher as Police Chief O'Brien
- Edward LeSaint as Judge (as Ed LeSaint)
