= The Crime of Helen Stanley =

1934 film

- Film poster
- Directed by: D. Ross Lederman
- Written by: Charles R. Condon; Harold Shumate
- Starring: Ralph Bellamy; Shirley Grey; Gail Patrick
- Cinematography: Allen G. Siegler
- Edited by: Otto Meyer
- Distributed by: Columbia Pictures
- Release date: April 20, 1934
- Running time: 58 minutes
- Country: United States
- Language: English

The Crime of Helen Stanley is a 1934 American pre-Code crime film directed by D. Ross Lederman and starring Ralph Bellamy, Shirley Grey and Gail Patrick. The film is also known as Murder in the Studio. It was the third in a series of four films featuring Bellamy as Inspector Trent of the NYPD following on from Before Midnight and One Is Guilty. The final film Girl in Danger in the sequence was released later in the year.

== Plot ==
Inspector Trent (Bellamy) investigates the death of film star Helen Stanley (Patrick) on the set. Another actor in the film, Wallach (Stephen Chase, uncredited) believes he has killed Stanley after he put a live bullet into a prop gun when he "shot" her, and commits suicide after confessing. However the live bullet was still in Wallach's gun.

Other suspects are the cameraman, Stanley's lover Lee Davis (Richmond), her sister, Betty Lane (Grey), who is having an affair with Davis. Also in the mix are Stanley's business manager, George Noel (Page) who owed her $60,000, the director Gibson (Prival) who Stanley knew was an illegal alien, and Stanley's bodyguard, Karl Williams (Sherman), who was blackmailing her. Trent solves the mystery by reenacting the murder, where the true killer is revealed.

== Cast ==
- Ralph Bellamy as Inspector Steve Trent
- Shirley Grey as Betty Lane
- Gail Patrick as Helen Stanley
- Kane Richmond as Lee Davis
- Bradley Page as George T. Noel
- Vincent Sherman as Karl Williams
- Phillip Trent as Larry King (as Clifford Jones)
- Lucien Prival as Gibson
- Ward Bond as Jack Baker

== Bibliography ==
- Backer, Ron. Mystery Movie Series of 1930s Hollywood. McFarland, 2012.
