= A Man's Game =

1934 film

- Film poster
- Directed by: D. Ross Lederman
- Written by: Harold Shumate
- Starring: Tim McCoy; Evalyn Knapp
- Distributed by: Columbia Pictures
- Release date: June 16, 1934
- Running time: 56 minutes
- Country: United States
- Language: English

A Man's Game is a 1934 American drama film directed by D. Ross Lederman. Released by Columbia Pictures, the film stars Tim McCoy, Evalyn Knapp and Ward Bond.

== Plot ==
A pair of firemen and friends, Tim Bradley and Dave Jordan, are both attracted to court stenographer Judy Manners after a rescue from a fire. Judy, involved against her will in an embezzlement scheme, ends up starting a fire to chase away the embezzlers as the firemen try to save her from both the flames and the crooks.

== Cast ==
- Tim McCoy as Tim Bradley
- Evalyn Knapp as Judy Manners
- Ward Bond as Dave Jordan
- DeWitt Jennings as Chief Jordan (as De Witt Jennings)
- Stephen Chase as Kelton (as Alden Chase)
- John Dilson as John T. Bradley
- Wade Boteler as Captain O'Hara
- Nick Copeland as T.W. Jackson
- Bob Kortman as Kane
- Edward LeSaint as Judge (uncredited)
