= End of the Trail (1932 film) =

1932 film

- Directed by: D. Ross Lederman
- Written by: Stuart Anthony; Zane Grey
- Starring: Tim McCoy
- Distributed by: Columbia Pictures
- Release date: December 19, 1932
- Running time: 61 minutes
- Country: United States
- Language: English

End of the Trail is a 1932 American Pre-Code Western film directed by D. Ross Lederman.

== Cast ==
- Tim McCoy as Captain Tim Travers
- Luana Walters as Luana (as Luanna Walters)
- Wheeler Oakman as Major Jenkins
- Wade Boteler as Sergeant O'Brien
- Lafe McKee as Colonel John Burke
- Wally Albright as Jimmy 'Sonny' Travers
- Chief White Eagle as Chief Grey Bear
