= The Life of Jimmy Dolan =

1933 film

- Theatrical release poster
- Directed by: Archie Mayo
- Screenplay by: David Boehm; Erwin S. Gelsey
- Based on: Sucker; 1933 play by Bertram Millhauser; Beulah Marie Dix
- Produced by: Hal B. Wallis
- Starring: Douglas Fairbanks Jr. Loretta Young; Aline MacMahon; Guy Kibbee; Lyle Talbot; Fifi D'Orsay; Harold Huber
- Cinematography: Arthur Edeson
- Edited by: Herbert I. Leeds
- Music by: Leo F. Forbstein
- Production company: Warner Bros. Pictures
- Distributed by: Warner Bros. Pictures
- Release date: June 3, 1933
- Running time: 88 minutes
- Country: United States
- Language: English

The Life of Jimmy Dolan, released in the UK as The Kid's Last Fight, is a 1933 American pre-Code sports drama film starring Douglas Fairbanks Jr. and Loretta Young. John Wayne has a small supporting role as a frightened boxer. The story was based on a 1933 play called Sucker by Bertram Millhauser. The film was remade in 1939 as They Made Me a Criminal.

== Plot ==
Southpaw boxer Jimmy Dolan claims that he believes in clean living outside the ring, but is a cynic when no one's looking. Blonde vixen Goldie West gets him drunk after a fight. Then when reporter Magee plans to write about Jimmy's behavior, a punch in the face accidentally kills Magee.

With the fighter certain to face charges and possible incarceration, his manager Doc Woods makes off with Jimmy's money and watch. Driving away with Goldie, they end up in a fiery car crash and are killed. Doc's face is unrecognizable, and because he's wearing Jimmy's watch, it is believed the boxer is dead.

A detective, Phlaxer, is unconvinced. He needs a big score to restore his career and get his pension, and Jimmy is the man who will bring him that success. The watch is on the wrong wrist for a left-hander. Jimmy, trying to take advantage of the situation and begin a new life, disappears. On the verge of starvation, he comes across a farm run for crippled children by a young woman named Peggy and her aunt, Auntie. He helps them with the kids as thanks for their hospitality.

A charity match against fearsome boxer King Cobra is arranged to raise badly needed money for the farm's mortgage. A photograph of Dolan under the assumed name of Jack Daugherty makes it obvious to Phlaxer that fugitive Jimmy Dolan is very much alive. The fight starts badly, but Jimmy continues, earning more money for the farm with each round he is able to fight. After being knocked down at the edge of the ring, Jimmy sees Phlaxer in the front row, who smiles and tells Jimmy, "I know who you are, southpaw!" Jimmy responds by getting up, furiously winning the round, and returning to his corner at the bell. Despite the strong round, Jimmy is exhausted, and is knocked out the following round.

Jimmy awakens groggily in the hospital with a doctor examining him and Phlaxer standing nearby. Auntie tearfully cries over Jack, telling him how he's saved the farm and helped them all, and begging him to recover. Peggy and the kids arrive, and Jimmy, not wanting to reveal that Phlaxer is there to take him into custody, tells her he needs to go. He tells her that he is going on a barnstorming boxing tour, earning money by fighting on tour with Phlaxer as his manager. She asks to go with them, but he tells her he has out go alone and will come right back to her. Phlaxer interjects, "in about 10 years." Jimmy and Peggy say goodbye with a tearful kiss.

Phlaxer takes him into custody and they arrive at the train station for a 3-day ride to where Jimmy will face trial. Phlaxer talks with Jimmy, and as they are boarding the train, he stops and tells Jimmy a story about how he, back in 1894, worked in a poor traveling theater company working for pennies giving tear-jerker shows. One show in particular was about a hero helping a family and a "poor honest gal" pay off their mortgage. He says, "I was the leading man, and I got the gal."

Seeing Jimmy has changed for the better, Phlaxer says, "Jimmy Dolan gone soft." With a glint in his eye, Phlaxer suggests that maybe he got the wrong man. Phlaxer jumps on the train as it starts to move, and leaves Jimmy to go to Peggy, telling him, "Go on. Beat it! Keep that kisser of yours off the camera. You don't photograph good. So long....Daugherty!"

== Cast ==
- Douglas Fairbanks Jr. as Jimmy Dolan
- Loretta Young as Peggy
- Aline MacMahon as Auntie (Mrs. Moore)
- Guy Kibbee as Phlaxer
- Edward Arnold as Inspector Ennis, Phlaxer's boss (uncredited)
- Lyle Talbot as Doc Woods
- Fifi D'Orsay as Budgie
- Harold Huber as Reggie Newman
- Shirley Grey as Goldie West (uncredited)
- George Meeker as Charles Magee (uncredited)
- John Wayne as Smith, a boxer
- Arthur Hohl as Herman Malvin (uncredited)
- Mickey Rooney as Freckles (uncredited)
- George Chandler as Boxing Handler
- Allen Hoskins as Sam (uncredited)

== See also ==
- List of boxing films
- John Wayne filmography
