= D. Ross Lederman =

American film and television director (1894–1972)

- Born: David Ross Lederman; December 12, 1894; Lancaster, Pennsylvania, United States
- Died: August 24, 1972 (aged 77); Hollywood, California, US
- Occupations: Film director, producer, writer
- Years active: 1925–1960
- Spouse: June Lederman

David Ross Lederman (December 12, 1894 – August 24, 1972) was an American film director noted for his Western, action, and adventure films of the 1930s and 1940s.

Starting out as an extra in Mack Sennett's Keystone Cops series, Lederman worked his way through the ranks of film production, and first made his mark as a second-unit director. He directed several B-Western serials in the early 1930s, such as Two-Fisted Law and Texas Cyclone both 1932, in which he worked with Tim McCoy and a young John Wayne. Becoming a full feature director in the late 1930s, Lederman specialized in action films and especially westerns, continuing to produce films with McCoy at Columbia Pictures.

== Style ==
By most accounts Lederman was regarded as a somewhat brusque man with an aversion to retakes and prima donna behavior and he clashed with McCoy on more than one occasion. He was renowned for his strict filming regimen and for bringing in films on time and under budget, which could only have helped to ensure his constant employment as a director, but was often criticised by critics in that several of his films looked rushed. Lederman's films have been described as having a "dystopian view of life" and a "relentless, inexorable narrative drive".

In the 1950s Lederman, like many of his "B" picture colleagues, concentrated on series television, and directed 31 episodes of the Captain Midnight television series as well as many episodes of Annie Oakley (1954), Buffalo Bill, Jr. and Range Rider, among others. He retired in the early 1960s.

== Personal life ==
He was married from the mid-'40s through the mid-'50s to June Lederman and was stepfather to her son Rusty, born about 1943. Lederman died in 1972.

== Filmography ==
=== Films ===
- Sheiks in Bagdad (1925) (Short) (as Ross Lederman)
- A Dog of the Regiment (1927) (as Ross Lederman)
- A Race for Life (1928)
- Rinty of the Desert (1928)
- Shadows of the Night (1928)
- The Million Dollar Collar (1929)
- The Man Hunter (1930) (as Ross Lederman)
- The Phantom of the West (1931)
- The Texas Ranger (1931)
- Branded (1931)
- The Fighting Marshal (1931)
- The Range Feud (1931)
- Ridin' for Justice (1932) (as Ross Lederman)
- Texas Cyclone (1932)
- High Speed (1932)
- The Riding Tornado (1932)
- Two-Fisted Law (1932)
- Daring Danger (1932)
- McKenna of the Mounted (1932)
- Speed Demon (1932)
- End of the Trail (1932)
- State Trooper (1933)
- Silent Men (1933)
- Soldiers of the Storm (1933)
- The Whirlwind (1933)
- Rusty Rides Alone (1933)
- The Crime of Helen Stanley (1934)
- Hell Bent for Love (1934)
- A Man's Game (1934)
- Beyond the Law (1934)
- Girl in Danger (1934)
- Murder in the Clouds (1934)
- Red Hot Tires (1935)
- Dinky (1935)
- Case of the Missing Man (1935)
- Moonlight on the Prairie (1935)
- Too Tough to Kill (1935)
- Hell-Ship Morgan (1936)
- Pride of the Marines (1936)
- Panic on the Air (1936)
- The Final Hour (1936)
- Alibi for Murder (1936)
- Come Closer, Folks (1936)
- Counterfeit Lady (1936)
- Motor Madness (1937)
- I Promise to Pay (1937)
- The Frame-Up (1937)
- A Dangerous Adventure (1937)
- The Game That Kills (1937)
- Tarzan's Revenge (1938)
- Juvenile Court (1938)
- Adventure in Sahara (1938)
- The Little Adventuress (1938)
- North of Shanghai (1939)
- Racketeers of the Range (1939)
- Military Academy (1940)
- Glamour for Sale (1940)
- Thundering Frontier (1940)
- Father's Son (1941)
- Across the Sierras (1941)
- Shadows on the Stairs (1941)
- Strange Alibi (1941)
- Here Comes the Cavalry (1941) (Short) (as Ross Lederman)
- Passage from Hong Kong (1941)
- The Body Disappears (1941)
- Bullet Scars (1942)
- I Was Framed (1942)
- Escape from Crime (1942)
- Busses Roar (1942)
- The Gorilla Man (1943)
- Adventure in Iraq (1943)
- Find the Blackmailer (1943)
- Gun to Gun (1944) (Short)
- The Racket Man (1944)
- Three of a Kind (1944)
- The Last Ride (1944)
- Navy Nurse (1945) (Short)
- Out of the Depths (1945)
- The Notorious Lone Wolf (1946)
- The Phantom Thief (1946)
- Dangerous Business (1946)
- Sing While You Dance (1946)
- Boston Blackie and the Law (1946)
- The Lone Wolf in Mexico (1947)
- Key Witness (1947)
- The Return of the Whistler (1948)
- Military Academy with That Tenth Avenue Gang (1950)
