= The Riding Tornado =

1932 film

- Film poster
- Directed by: D. Ross Lederman
- Written by: Kurt Kempler; William Colt MacDonald
- Distributed by: Columbia Pictures
- Release date: May 4, 1932
- Running time: 64 minutes
- Country: United States
- Language: English

The Riding Tornado is a 1932 American Pre-Code Western film directed by D. Ross Lederman.

== Cast ==
- Tim McCoy as Tim Torrant
- Shirley Grey as Patsy Olcott
- Montagu Love as Walt Corson
- Wheeler Oakman as Hatch Engall
- Wallace MacDonald as Dick Stark (Olcott's foreman)
- Russell Simpson as Sheriff
- Vernon Dent as Bartender Hefty
- Lafe McKee as Hiram Olcott
