= Get That Girl (1932 film) =

1933 film

- 1935 French poster
- Directed by: George Crone
- Written by: Charles R. Condon
- Produced by: Richard Talmadge
- Starring: Richard Talmadge; Shirley Grey; Fred Malatesta
- Cinematography: Harry Jackson; Jack Stevens
- Production company: Richard Talmadge Productions
- Distributed by: Mercury Pictures; Ideal Films (UK)
- Release date: July 1, 1932
- Running time: 67 minutes
- Country: United States
- Language: English

Get That Girl is a 1932 American pre-Code mystery film directed by George Crone and starring Richard Talmadge, Shirley Grey and Fred Malatesta.

== Plot ==
Dick Bartlett encounters Ruth Dale on a train and they gradually bond despite her initial suspicions of him. She has recently received a warning telegram and at first thinks he may be following her. When she disappears from the train, he discovers that she is due for a large inheritance and has been kidnapped to prevent her claiming it. Ruth has been taken to an isolated sanatorium run by a mad doctor who tries to turn women into mannequins. If she is held there long enough she was forfeit the inheritance, but Dick manages to trail her there in order to stage a rescue.

== Cast ==
- Richard Talmadge as Dick Bartlett
- Shirley Grey as Ruth Dale
- Fred Malatesta as Dr. Sandro Tito
- Carl Stockdale as Leader of the Kidnap Plot
- Lloyd Ingraham as John, the Gardener
- Geneva Mitchell as Mme. Nedra Tito
- Victor Metzetti as Henchman Schultz
- Billy Jones as Mike - Short Hencman
- James Guilfoyle as The Plumber
- Lydia Knott as Old Lady on Train
- Arthur Metzetti as Henchman
- Otto Metzetti as Henchman

== Bibliography ==
- Pitts, Michael R. Poverty Row Studios, 1929–1940: An Illustrated History of 55 Independent Film Companies, with a Filmography for Each. McFarland & Company, 2005.
- Rigby, Jonathan. American Gothic: Sixty Years of Horror Cinema. Reynolds & Hearn, 2007.
