= Rusty Rides Alone =

1933 film

- Film poster
- Directed by: D. Ross Lederman
- Written by: Walter J. Coburn; Robert Quigley
- Starring: Tim McCoy
- Distributed by: Columbia Pictures
- Release date: May 26, 1933
- Running time: 58 minutes
- Country: United States
- Language: English

Rusty Rides Alone is a 1933 American Pre-Code Western film directed by D. Ross Lederman and starring Tim McCoy. The film was remade in 1939 as Riders of the Sage.

== Cast ==
- Tim McCoy as Tim Burke
- Silver King the Dog as Silver - Tim's dog
- Barbara Weeks as Mollie Martin
- Dorothy Burgess as Mona Quillan
- Wheeler Oakman as Poe Powers
- Rockliffe Fellowes as Bart Quillan (as Rockcliffe Fellows)
- Edmund Burns as Steve Reynolds
- Clarence Geldart as Jim Martin (as Clarence Geldert)
- Jay Wilsey (uncredited)
