= Girl in Danger =

1934 film

- Film poster
- Directed by: D. Ross Lederman
- Written by: Harold Shumate
- Starring: Ralph Bellamy; Shirley Grey; Arthur Hohl
- Production company: Columbia Pictures
- Distributed by: Columbia Pictures
- Release date: September 11, 1934
- Running time: 57 minutes
- Country: United States
- Language: English

Girl in Danger is a 1934 American crime film directed by D. Ross Lederman and starring Ralph Bellamy, Shirley Grey and Arthur Hohl. Produced and distributed by Columbia Pictures, it was the fourth and final entry in a series featuring Bellamy as NYPD Inspector Steve Trent. The three previous films were Before Midnight, One Is Guilty and The Crime of Helen Stanley.

== Cast ==
- Ralph Bellamy as Inspector Steve Trent
- Shirley Grey as Gloria Gale
- Arthur Hohl as Albert Beckett
- Charles Sabin as Daniel S. Terrence
- J. Carrol Naish as Mike Russo (as Carrol Naish)
- Ward Bond as Wynkoski
- Edward LeSaint as Chief O'Brien (as Ed Le Saint)
- Vincent Sherman as Willie Tolini
- Edward Keane as Thornton

== Production ==
The working title of the film was By Persons Unknown.

== Bibliography ==
- Backer, Ron. Mystery Movie Series of 1930s Hollywood. McFarland, 2012.
