= Charming Sinners =

1929 American pre-Code comedy film

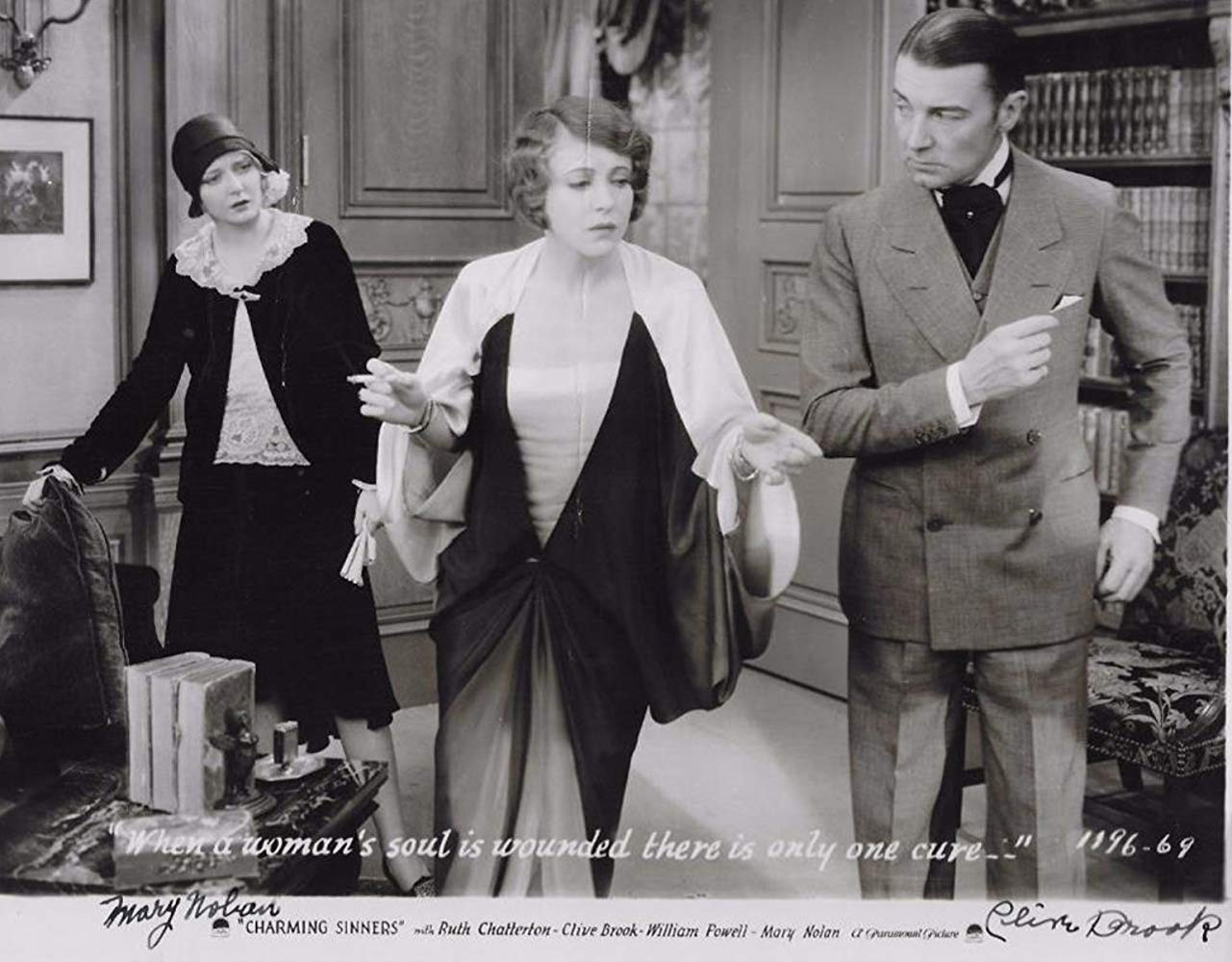
- Directed by: Robert Milton; Dorothy Arzner (uncredited)
- Screenplay by: Doris Anderson
- Based on: The Constant Wife by W. Somerset Maugham
- Starring: Ruth Chatterton; Clive Brook; Mary Nolan; William Powell; Laura Hope Crews; Florence Eldridge
- Cinematography: Victor Milner
- Edited by: Verna Willis
- Music by: Karl Hajos; W. Franke Harling
- Production company: Paramount Pictures
- Distributed by: Paramount Pictures
- Release date: July 6, 1929
- Running time: 66 minutes
- Country: United States
- Language: English

Charming Sinners is a 1929 American pre-Code comedy film directed by Robert Milton and Dorothy Arzner (who was uncredited), with a screenplay by Doris Anderson adapted from the 1926 play The Constant Wife written by W. Somerset Maugham. The film stars Ruth Chatterton, Clive Brook, Mary Nolan, William Powell, Laura Hope Crews and Florence Eldridge. The film was released on August 17, 1929, by Paramount Pictures.

It has been described as a "splendid example of the early talkie period" with use of static camera and dialogue-heavy scenes.

== Plot ==
The full film

In London, aware of her husband's longstanding affair and feeling neglected, Kathryn Miles flirts with a former flame in a plot to teach her husband a lesson without endangering their marriage.

== Cast ==
- Ruth Chatterton as Kathryn Miles
- Clive Brook as Robert Miles
- Mary Nolan as Anne-Marie Whitley
- William Powell as Karl Kraley
- Laura Hope Crews as Mrs. Carr
- Florence Eldridge as Helen Carr
- Montagu Love as George Whitley
- Juliette Crosby as Margaret
- Lorraine MacLean as Alice
- Claud Allister as Gregson

== See also ==
- List of early sound feature films (1926–1929)
- The Constant Wife, a 1962 West German film adaptation directed by Tom Pevsner

== Bibliography ==
- Bryant, Roger. William Powell: The Life and Films. McFarland, 2014.
- Mayne, Judith. Directed by Dorothy Arzner. Indiana University Press, 1995
