= Dale Ishimoto =

American actor (1923–2004)

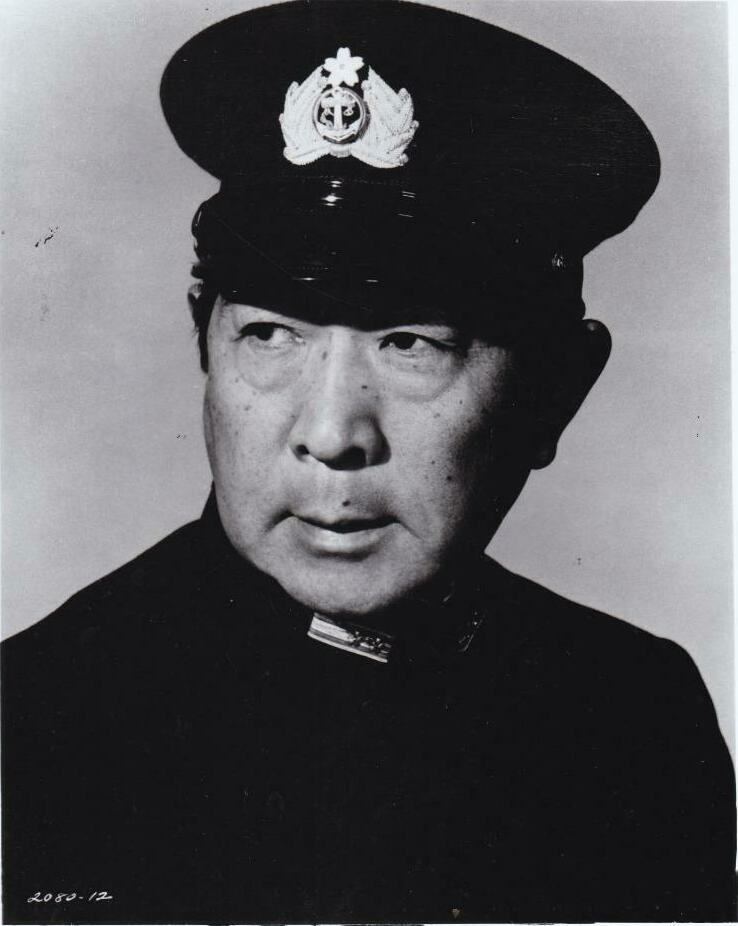
- Ishimoto in a publicity photo for Midway (1976)
- Born: Dale Isamu Ishimoto; April 3, 1923; Delta, Colorado, U.S.
- Died: March 4, 2004 (aged 80); Culver City, California, U.S.
- Years active: 1957–1998
- Spouse: Miiko Taka (m. 1944; div. 1958)
- Military career
- Allegiance: United States
- Branch: United States Army
- Service years: 1943-1945
- Unit: 442nd Regimental Combat Team
- Conflicts: World War II

Dale Isamu Ishimoto (April 3, 1923 – March 4, 2004) was an American actor of Japanese descent.

== Early life ==
A second-generation Japanese American (Nisei), Ishimoto was born in Delta, Colorado in 1923 and was raised in Guadalupe, California.

=== Military service ===
After being sent to the Gila River internment camp in Arizona, Ishimoto volunteered to fight in World War II, joining the 442nd Regimental Combat Team. After two years, he was awarded a Purple Heart and given a medical discharge.

== Career ==
After starting a business in Chicago, he moved back to California, where he grew up, and started his acting career at the Altadena Playhouse. He became a "familiar figure" for playing "villainous Japanese soldiers".

Over the course of his career, he acted in a wide variety of movies, such as a Japanese army captain in Beach Red (1967), a Korean doctor in MASH (1970), a karate instructor in Superchick (1973), and as Vice Admiral Boshiro Hosogaya in Midway (1976).

He became known in the late 1990s for his appearances in television commercials for Nissan in which he portrayed Yutaka Katayama, the company's former president. He also appeared in one episode of Wanted: Dead or Alive.

Ishimoto also co-founded the Canyon Theatre Guild in Santa Clarita, and taught acting at the Pasadena Playhouse. After retiring from acting in 1998, he chaired local charters of the American Red Cross and Boys & Girls Clubs of America.

== Personal life ==
Ishimoto married Miiko Taka, an actress and the long-time interpreter for Toshiro Mifune and Akira Kurosawa, in Baltimore in 1944. They had two children: a son and a daughter. They divorced in 1958. Ishimoto was Methodist.

=== Death ===
Ishimoto died in Culver City, California on March 4, 2004, aged 80.

== Filmography ==
- The King and I (1956) - Crewman (uncredited)
- Tokyo After Dark (1959) - Reporter (uncredited)
- Battle of the Coral Sea (1959) - Japanese Guard (uncredited)
- Never So Few (1959) - Scout (uncredited)
- The Wackiest Ship in the Army (1960) - Japanese Pilot (uncredited)
- The Great Impostor (1961) - Korean Soldier (uncredited)
- Operation Bottleneck (1961) - Matsu
- Battle at Bloody Beach (1961) - Blanco
- A Majority of One (1961) - Taxi Driver (uncredited)
- Sea Hunt (1961) - Season 4, Episode 17
- The Nun and the Sergeant (1962) - Pak
- PT 109 (1963) - Commander (uncredited)
- McHale's Navy (1964) - Japanese Captain
- Moro Witch Doctor (1964) - Manuel Romblon
- King Rat (1965) - Yoshima
- Walk, Don't Run (1966) - Plainclothesman (uncredited)
- The Sweet and the Bitter (1967) - Dick Kazanami
- Beach Red (1967) - Captain Tanaka
- MASH (1970) - Korean Doctor (uncredited)
- The Games (1970) - Japanese Doctor
- Superchick (1973) - Karate Instructor
- When the North Wind Blows (1974) - Yermak
- Sharks' Treasure (1975) - Ishi
- Midway (1976) - Vice Admiral Boshiro Hosogaya
- Enter the Ninja (1981) - Komori
- Cracking Up (1983) - Japanese Mechanic
- Cannonball Run II (1984) - Japanese Businessman (uncredited)
- Ninja III: The Domination (1984) - Okuda
- Come See the Paradise (1990) - Mr. Ogata
- Beverly Hills Ninja (1997) - Old Japanese Man
- Inconceivable (1998) - Mr. Akiyama (final film role)

== Selected television ==
Year	Title	Role	Notes
1962	Have Gun - Will Travel	Temuchin - Paladin's Fencing Instructor	Episode "The Mark of Cain"
1962-63	McHale's Navy	Japanese Officer	3 Episodes
1961	Wanted: Dead or Alive	Taro Yamamoto	Season 3, Episode 24 "The Long Search"
1961	The Twilight Zone	Sgt. Yamazaki	Season 3, Episode 15 "A Quality of Mercy"
