= The Constant Wife =

1926 play by W. Somerset Maugham

- Original language: English
- Written by: W. Somerset Maugham
- Characters: Mrs. Culver; Bentley; Martha Culver; Barbara Fawcett; Constance Middleton; Marie-Louise Durham; John Middleton FRCS; Bernard Kersal; Mortimer Durham
- Genre: comedy of manners
- Setting: A house in Harley Street, 1920s

Premiere
- Date: November 1, 1926
- Place: Ohio Theatre, Cleveland, Ohio

The Constant Wife, a play written in 1926 by W. Somerset Maugham, is a comedy whose modern and amusing take on marriage and infidelity gives a quick-witted, alternative view on how to deal with an extramarital affair.

A "sparkling comedy of ill manners", The Constant Wife features the resourceful and charming Constance Middleton, who has long known that her husband had been having an affair with her best friend, Marie-Louise. When the affair is publicly acknowledged, rather than reprimanding or divorcing him, she embraces the opportunity to create an independent life, starting a new job, paying her husband for room and board, and taking on her own lover.

The Constant Wife was later published for general sale in April 1927.

== Plot ==
Called one of Maugham's "most clever and captivating creations", Constance is the calm, intelligent, and self-possessed wife of John Middleton, a successful London doctor. Knowing full well of her husband's infidelity with her best friend Marie-Louise, Constance purposefully pretends that she has no idea of the affair. When Marie-Louise's jealous husband publicly confronts Constance about their spouses' affair, Constance protects both her husband and Marie-Louise by cleverly lying to disprove his evidence. She later reveals to her family that she has known of the affair all along, and further confounds them by demonstrating a total lack of sentiment on the subject of matrimony. Resolving to establish her own economic independence ("which she considers the only real independence"), she goes into business as an interior decorator with her friend Barbara. After taking London by storm in her new role, she determines to pay her husband for her room and board, and then announces she is going off for an Italian vacation with a longtime admirer. Her husband is, in turn, shocked and outraged at this turn of events, but finally capitulates to her outrageous charm—and to their unusual arrangement—as the curtain falls.

== Production history ==
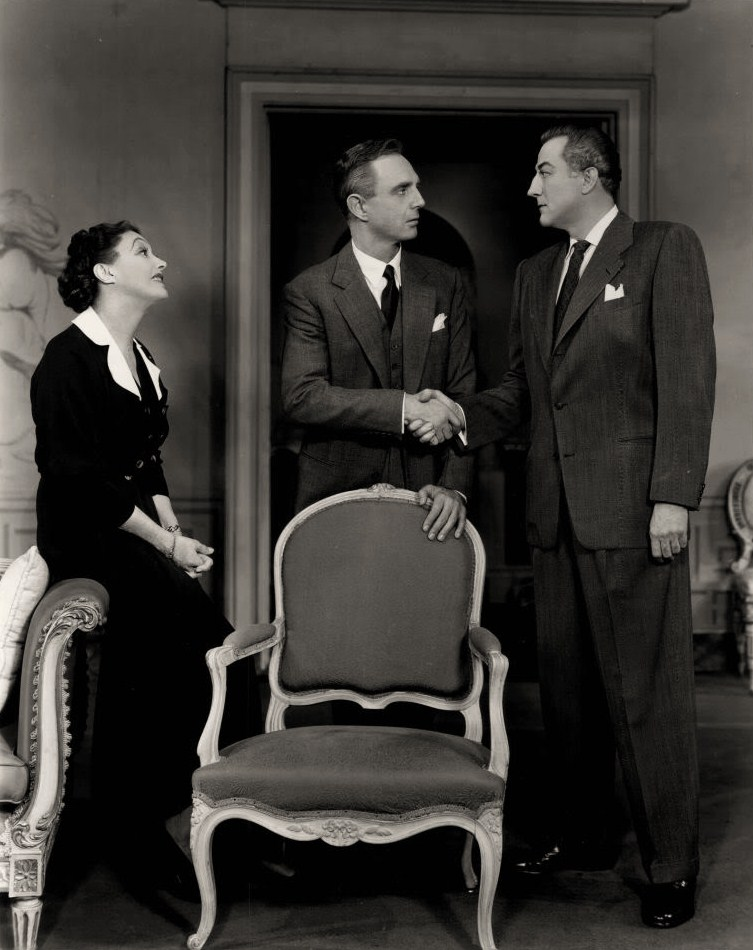
Katharine Cornell, Robert Flemyng and John Emery in The Constant Wife (1953)

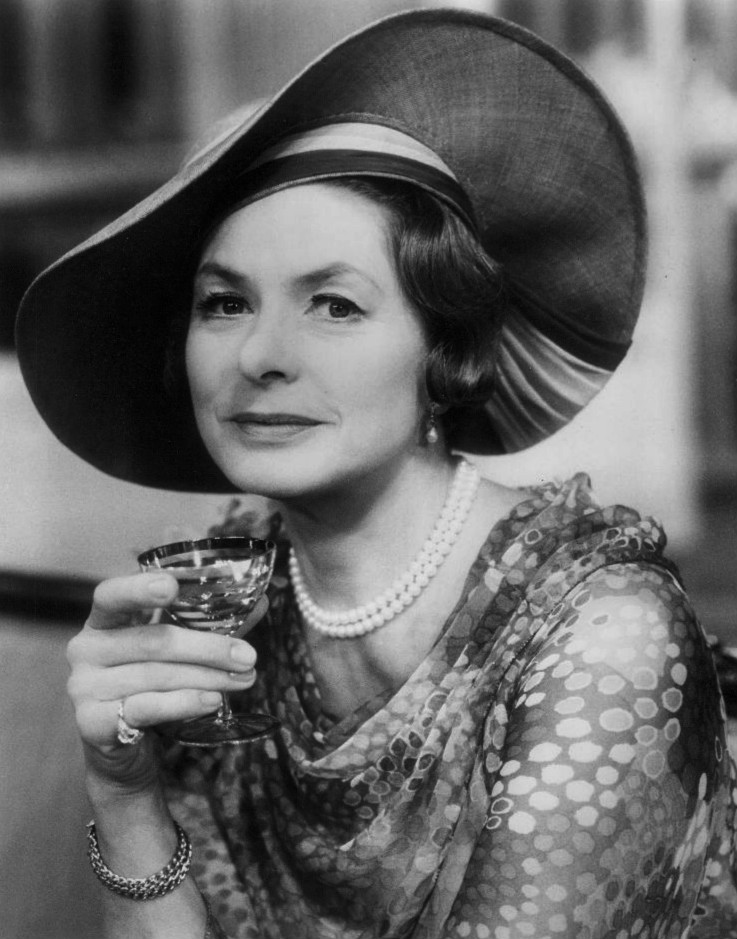
Ingrid Bergman in The Constant Wife (1975)

The play was first produced in Cleveland, Ohio, at the Ohio Theatre, on November 1, 1926, with Ethel Barrymore playing the title role, and Mabel Terry-Lewis and C. Aubrey Smith in support. It subsequently opened on Broadway, running for 295 performances, and was successfully toured by Ms. Barrymore afterwards. When the first edition of the play was published in 1927, Maugham dedicated it to her. Years later, he said that her performance was the best he had seen in any of his plays.

The Constant Wife has been produced multiple times in London—Ruth Chatterton (Globe Theatre, 1937); Ingrid Bergman (Albery Theatre, September 1973), Jenny Seagrove (Apollo Theatre, April 2002, then transferring to the Lyric Theatre, June 2002)—despite a rocky premier starring Fay Compton at the Strand Theatre in April 1927, in part due to the theatre's muddling of seating arrangements and Ms. Compton's insulting the audience.

In December 1951, a U.S. revival starring Katharine Cornell was staged for a summer festival in Colorado. It was such a success that Cornell took the production to the National Theatre on Broadway starring herself and Brian Aherne. It grossed more money for Cornell's production company than any play she and her husband-director Guthrie McClintic ever produced.

In addition to the 2005 revival on Broadway, other revivals include John Gielgud's staging, also starring Ingrid Bergman and Jack Gwillim, at the Shubert Theatre on Broadway (1975), Minneapolis (2005), Charleston, SC (2007), and the Gate Theatre, Dublin (2016) starring Tara Blaise.

The Constant Wife was most recently on Broadway in 2005, where Variety described it as "an antecedent to the women of 'Desperate Housewives' and 'Sex and the City'". At the 60th Tony Awards, Kate Burton (Constance Culver Middleton) and Lynn Redgrave (Mrs. Culver) were both nominated for Best Leading Actress in a Play.

The Royal Shakespeare Company staged an adapted production in 2025 at the Stratford Swan Theatre starring Rose Leslie, followed by a recast 2026 UK tour starring Kara Tointon, including a presentation on board a transatlantic ship, prior to a West End residency. This production was adapted by Laura Wade, directed by Tamara Harvey and produced by David Pugh, with set and costumes designed by Anna Fleischle and Cat Fuller, and a score by Jamie Cullum.

== Film adaptations ==
It was adapted as the American film Charming Sinners (1929), with William Powell, Clive Brook, Ruth Chatterton and Mary Nolan, directed by Robert Milton, It was produced and distributed by Hollywood studio Paramount Pictures. In 1962 a West German film adaption The Constant Wife was produced, directed by Tom Pevsner and starring Lilli Palmer and Peter van Eyck.

== Awards and nominations ==
=== 1975 Broadway revival ===
Year	Award	Category	Nominee	Result
1975	Drama Desk Award	Outstanding Actress in a Play	Caroline Lagerfelt	Nominated

=== 2005 Broadway revival ===
Year	Award	Category	Nominee	Result
2006	Tony Award	Best Revival of a Play		Nominated
2006	Tony Award	Best Actress in a Play	Kate Burton	Nominated
2006	Tony Award	Best Actress in a Play	Lynn Redgrave	Nominated
2006	Tony Award	Best Costume Design of a Play	Michael Krass	Nominated
2006	Drama Desk Award	Outstanding Actress in a Play	Lynn Redgrave	Nominated
