= Registered Nurse (film) =

1934 film

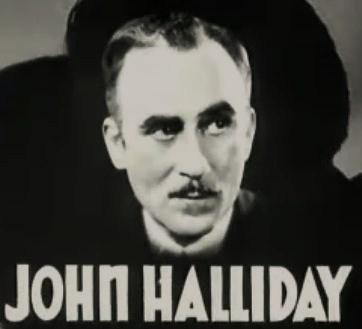
- John Halliday in the film trailer
- Directed by: Robert Florey
- Screenplay by: Peter Milne; Lillie Hayward
- Based on: Miss Benton, R.N. (1930 play) by Florence Johns; Wilton Lackaye Jr.
- Produced by: Samuel Bischoff (uncredited)
- Starring: Bebe Daniels
- Cinematography: Sidney Hickox
- Edited by: Jack Killifer
- Music by: Heinz Roemheld (uncredited)
- Production company: First National Pictures
- Distributed by: Warner Bros. Pictures
- Release date: April 7, 1934
- Running time: 63 minutes
- Country: United States
- Language: English

Registered Nurse is a 1934 American pre-Code drama film produced by First National Pictures and released through its parent company Warner Bros. Pictures. The film was directed by Robert Florey and stars Bebe Daniels in her final role for Warner Bros.

== Plot ==
Sylvia Benton is married to belligerent drunk but after a violent quarrel which results in a car crash, she decides to go back to nursing. Three years later Benton is the best nurse at the hospital, all the doctors think so including dedicated surgeon Dr. Hedwig and chronic skirt chaser Dr. Connolly.

Sylvia has a secret, after the car crash her husband went insane and is now in an asylum. That's why she is keeping the doctors at arm's length whenever they mention marriage. Suddenly he escapes and finds himself at the same hospital where Sylvia is stationed (he doesn't know that) wanting an operation to return his sanity so he can make up to his wife for all those bitter years. A chance conversation with an interfering patient give Jim Benton the idea to leap out of the hospital window to his death, paving the way for Sylvia to find happiness with Dr. Hedwig.

== Cast ==
- Bebe Daniels as Sylvia Benton
- Lyle Talbot as Dr. Greg Connolly
- John Halliday as Dr. Hedwig
- Irene Franklin as Sadie Harris
- Sidney Toler as Frankie Sylvestrie
- Gordon Westcott as Jim Benton
- Minna Gombell as Nurse Beulah Schloss
- Beulah Bondi as Nurse McKenna
- Vince Barnett as Jerry
- Phillip Reed as Bill
- Mayo Methot as Nurse Gloria Hammond
- Edward Gargan as Officer O'Brien
- Lester Dorr as Attendant (uncredited)
- Dennis O'Keefe as Interne (uncredited)

== Preservation status ==
Registered Nurse is preserved at the Library of Congress.

== Home media ==
The film was released on the Warner Archive Collection home label, double-billed with the Ruth Chatterton film The Crash.
