= Eva Lang =

Eva Lang may refer to:

- Eva Lang (economist)
- Eva Lang (actress)
- Eva Lang (writer)
