= The Sweet and the Bitter =

The Sweet and the Bitter may refer to:

- The Sweet and the Bitter (2007 film), an Italian crime-drama film
- The Sweet and the Bitter (1967 film), a Canadian film
