= The Impatient Maiden =

1932 film

- Mae Clark and John Halliday
- Directed by: James Whale
- Written by: Richard Schayer; Winifred Dunn; James Mulhauser (additional dialogue)
- Produced by: Carl Laemmle Jr. E.M. Asher (associate producer) (uncredited)
- Starring: Lew Ayres; Mae Clarke
- Cinematography: Arthur Edeson
- Edited by: Clarence Kolster
- Distributed by: Universal Pictures
- Release date: March 1, 1932
- Running time: 72 minutes
- Country: United States
- Language: English

The Impatient Maiden is a 1932 American pre-Code drama film directed by James Whale, starring Lew Ayres and Mae Clarke, and released by Universal Pictures. The screenplay was written by Richard Schayer and Winifred Dunn, based on the novel The Impatient Virgin, by Donald Henderson Clarke.

== Cast ==
- Lew Ayres as Dr. Myron Brown
- Mae Clarke as Ruth Robbins
- Una Merkel as Betty Merrick
- Andy Devine as Clarence Howe
- John Halliday as Albert Hartman
- Oscar Apfel as Dr. Wilcox
- Ethel Griffies as Nurse Lovett
- Helen Jerome Eddy as Mrs. Gilman
- Bert Roach as Mr. Gilman
- Cecil Cunningham as Mrs. Rosy
- Lorin Raker as Mr. Rosy
- Blanche Payson as Mrs. Thomas
- Arthur Hoyt as Mr. Thomas
- Monte Montague as ambulance driver

== Critical Response ==
International photographer was reserved in its praise: "Universal seems to have overestimated the possibilities of the novel by Donald Henderson Clarke from which the adaptation was made" but singled Whale for his "capable direction" and Divine for his "very amusing characterization."
