= Teru Shimada =

Japanese-American actor(1905–1988)

- Teru Shimada in You Only Live Twice, 1967
- Born: Akira Shimada; November 17, 1905; Mito, Ibaraki, Japan
- Died: June 19, 1988 (aged 82); Los Angeles, California, U.S.
- Citizenship: American (1954–death)
- Occupation: Actor
- Years active: 1932–1975

Japanese name
- Kanji: 島田 輝
- Hiragana: しまだ てる
- Katakana: シマダ テル
Transcriptions
- Romanization: Shimada Teru

Japanese name
- Kanji: 島田 明
- Hiragana: しまだ あきら
- Katakana: シマダ アキラ
Transcriptions
- Romanization: Shimada Akira

Teru Shimada (島田輝 Shimada Teru, born Akira Shimada (島田明 Shimada Akira); November 17, 1905 – June 19, 1988) was a Japanese-American actor.

A Nikkeijin (first-generation Japanese-American), Shimada emigrated to the United States in the early 1930s to follow in the footsteps of his idol Sessue Hayakawa, where he began acting in theatre before finding a steady career playing supporting roles in Hollywood films. After being interned during World War II, Shimada found a career resurgence starring opposite Humphrey Bogart in the 1949 film, Tokyo Joe.

Shimada subsequently appeared in many films and television series throughout the 1950s and 60s. He also appeared in an episode ("And Five of Us are Left") of the 1960s American television series Voyage to the Bottom of the Sea in 1965. That year, he also made a guest appearance on Perry Mason as Dr. Maseo Tachikawa in "The Case of the Baffling Bug" and as Ito Kumagi in the 1962 episode "The Case of the Capricious Corpse". In 1970, he had had a leading role in an episode of Hawaii Five-O ("The Reunion"). Arguably his most well-known role came in 1967, when he was cast as Mr. Osato, a SPECTRE agent in the 1967 James Bond film, You Only Live Twice.

He later retired in the mid-1970s following appearances in Barnaby Jones and The Six Million Dollar Man and died in Encino, Los Angeles, California in 1988.

== Early life ==
Shimada was born Akira Shimada (JP: 島田明) in the city of Mito, Ibaraki Prefecture, in the Kantō region of Japan. His birth date has been variously reported as both 1905 and 1906.

Shimada was intrigued from early childhood by the tales of the entertainers who would visit the home of his artist grandfather, whom he visited frequently and briefly lived with. The young Shimada regularly went to the movies, and idolized cowboy star Tom Mix. After seeing Japanese expatriate actor Sessue Hayakawa in a Hollywood film, Shimada decided to emigrate to the United States to become an actor. He arrived in San Francisco in March 1924, knowing no English, on a student visa.

While Shimada ultimately attended two years of college, his determination to become an actor never changed, and he remained in the United States after leaving college (during which time he was technically an illegal alien). He worked for some time as a janitor at the Granada Theatre, where he began taking acting lessons. In the following years, he moved to Los Angeles, where he supported himself as a hotel clerk and then a pressman for a Japanese-language newspaper.

== Career ==
=== 1930s ===
Shimada's first professional acting role was as a valet in a Los Angeles production of Hale Hamilton's play Dear Me in 1929. He enrolled in acting courses at the studio of Katherine Hamil, and subsequently starred in a student production of The Flower of Edo, a one-act play about Japan. In June 1931, he headlined a class show in Los Angeles's Jinnistan Grotto theater, performing scenes from Melchior Lengyel's play The Typhoon.

As the American film industry shifted to sound films, Shimada took English and speech classes, while supporting himself through odd jobs as a butler, gardener, clerk, and dishwasher. He first broke into films with a brief role in The Night Club Lady (1932), directed by Irving Cummings. Shortly afterward, he auditioned for Cecil B. DeMille. Shimada later recalled that in his first interview with the great director, DeMille stated that he was looking for a "young, strong husky man who can climb a rope" for his Pacific Island epic, Four Frightened People, and he invited Shimada to climb a rope hanging in his office. After demonstrating his athletic prowess, Shinada was hired to play a "sakai" native guide, one who clambered up the tall palms to get food and scan the horizon. He sailed to Hawaii with the cast and crew for several weeks of filming.

After his work with DeMille, Shimada was hired for numerous extra roles and bit parts, mainly uncredited, as houseboys and valets. He was cast as a martial artist in the 1934 potboiler Charlie Chan's Courage. In Midnight Club, made shortly after, he was a member of a gang of jewel thieves, and he then played a gangster henchman in Public Hero ﹟1. He appeared briefly the Claudette Colbert-Louise Beavers version of the film Imitation of Life (1934) and in Mae West's film, Klondike Annie (1936).

Yearning for better roles, Shimada's was cast in his first featured part as a comic Yokohama teahouse proprietor in Oil for the Lamps of China (1935), swiftly followed by a role as a showy servant in Revolt of the Zombies (1936). That same year, he played his first serious part, in the independently produced film White Legion. The film dramatizes the adventures of a group of heroic doctors who travel to Panama during the building of the Panama Canal in search of a cure for yellow fever. Shimada's character Dr. Nogi (based on the celebrated Japanese-born bacteriologist Hideyo Noguchi) has special powers to resist pain and treat illness. Shimada's last prewar role of importance was in the 1939 thriller Mr. Moto's Last Warning, in which his character was a decoy who impersonated the eponymous Japanese spy (played, ironically, by a non-Japanese, Austrian-born actor Peter Lorre).

=== World War II and internment ===
Shimada was taken by surprise by Executive Order 9066 and the mass removal of Japanese Americans. He dreamed of relocating to New York and establishing himself in the Manhattan theater world, but was unable to get away from the West Coast in time before resettlement was "frozen" in late March. Instead, in May 1942 he was removed to the Poston War Relocation Center.

Still only in his mid-thirties and fluent in English, Shimada was a rare figure among the Issei in camp. Because of his fame as an actor, he was named production manager of a Nisei drama group, the Poston Drama Guild. The Guild performed in mess halls, putting on skits and comic sketches of camp life, including "Coming to Boilton" and "The Blockhead's Nightmare". In fall 1942, the Guild announced a forthcoming original three-act comedy, "Postonese", depicting life in camp, to be written and directed by Shimada and his fellow actor Wilfred Horiuchi. Shimada took over an entire barrack and designed a stage for the dramatic department.

An article in the Poston News-Chronicle stated that the stage had "a synchronized platform, footlight, spotlights, ceiling and natural wood furniture." Shimada noted, "We don't know anything about building a stage—it isn't in our line. But we are forced to do it because this is Poston." The group was also forced to construct its own chairs for the theater. However, materials were scarce and the work on the theater was slow. Worse yet, during the hiatus of the construction, the Guild's original actors went into other jobs or began leaving camp, and Shimada was forced to re-cast his show—he thought of recruiting high school students. By early 1943, the little theater was nearly completed. However, one day a fire broke out in a neighboring mess hall, and swept through the barracks and consumed the stage and seats. The entire theater, the product of months of labor, was destroyed almost instantly.

Stunned and distraught by the loss, Shimada nonetheless resolved to carry on. Armed with a certificate from the American Red Cross that authorized him to give classes in swimming and lifeguard training, he joined Captain Tetsuo Sakamoto to champion a "build a pool" project. Such a swimming pool, Shimada announced, would "cool off the griddled brains of the old-timers" and would offer all the children in the camp a chance to learn how to swim. Shimada helped recruit a group of volunteers to dig a pool and put up shade around it. (The workers also built a large diving platform—so large, in fact, that it would ultimately be converted for use as a makeshift outdoor stage for skits by the drama group as well).

The new pool turned out to be wildly popular. Over the next months, Shimada supervised nineteen lifeguards who held swimming classes and cared for thousands of young Nisei swimmers. They even held a series of water carnivals with races, diving competitions, and talent shows. At the request of John W. Powell, chief of Poston's community management division, Shimada was appointed Unit I Community Activities Coordinator. "Mr. Shimada's proven leadership of the younger men, and his sympathetic understanding of the needs and interests of the older people, will be of great value to the enjoyment and harmony of the residents of Unit I," Powell told the Poston News-Chronicle. In February 1945, Shimada's residence block elected him as a block leader, and he resigned his other positions.

While he felt pride in his community activities, Shimada loathed the heat and hardships of Poston and yearned to return to acting. Ironically, during the war Hollywood had produced numerous films with villainous Japanese characters, but all were played by Chinese or Korean or white actors. Even after the end of World War II and the return of Japanese Americans to the West Coast, the other Nikkei actors who had worked in Hollywood in the 1920s and 1930s (apart from Sessue Hayakawa) would disappear from view.

=== Post-war career ===
In summer 1945, while still confined at Poston, Shimada was cast as a Filipino scout in a war propaganda film for 20th Century Fox, to be entitled American Guerilla in the Philippines. However, once Japan surrendered and the war ended in late summer 1945, the project was shelved indefinitely. Shimada later claimed that he was summoned back to Hollywood by a telegram from Paul Wilkins, former casting director at MGM, and that he swiftly made the trip back from Poston to Culver City in a milk truck, but was unable to find work once he arrived. He thus returned to his previous idea of moving to New York. Once there took up residence at the Cherrie Lane Theatre in Greenwich Village. There he stayed backstage and studied theatrical technique, even as he searched for agents and pounded the pavements for work.

After several weeks of searching, Shimada found a golden opportunity. He was cast in The First Wife, a play written by the Nobel laureate Pearl S. Buck based on her own story, and performed by The Chinese Theatre, a troupe of Chinese actors that she sponsored. Shimada's role was that of Yuan, a young Chinese man who returns to his family in China after spending several years studying in the United States, and clashes with his wife because of her traditional ways. To obscure his Japanese origins, Shimada was billed under a Chinese-sounding name, "Shi Ma-Da". After a run in New York, he joined the show for an extended tour of the United States, and remained with the production for two years. When the show played New Orleans in February 1946, local critic Gilbert Cosulich described Shimada's lead performance as "intelligently though a bit stiffly portrayed."

=== Tokyo Joe ===
In 1949, Shimada was recruited back to Hollywood by Robert Lord, who had joined leading man Humphrey Bogart to form the production company Santana Productions. The two started work on Tokyo Joe, a new motion picture starring Bogart that would be set in Occupation-era Japan, and sought Japanese actors to play in it. The producers located Sessue Hayakawa, by then long absent from Hollywood and living in France, and he agreed to make a comeback role as the main villain. Meanwhile, Lord remembered Teru Shimada from Oil for the Lamps of China, on which he had been a writer, and sought him out as well.

Shimada's first appearance in Tokyo Joe is near the beginning of the film. Bogart's character Joe Barrett, who had run a bar in Tokyo before the war, comes back to occupied Japan after 7 years away to take care of some unfinished business. He visits his bar, though it is formally off limits to Allied personnel. There Bogart's Joe is reunited with his old friend and partner Ito, played by Shimada, who now runs the "joint". While Shimada's role was originally intended to be small, as work on the film progressed he was given increasingly more to do. In fact, in the final film, Joe and Ito have a friendly judo match, and Ito succeeds in flooring his opponent. Shimada later stated that Tokyo Joe had been his most enjoyable film experience, as even people who did not know his name recognized him as the man who had beaten Bogart in a fair fight.

=== 1950s ===
Shimada's performance in Tokyo Joe led to a revival of his career in Hollywood. Soon after, he was cast as a brutal Japanese officer in Fox's Three Came Home and a villainous captain of a Chinese junk in Smuggler's Island. In The Bridges at Toko-Ri he plays a man who brings his wife and children to a Japanese bath and is surprised to find William Holden and his family already in the tub. In House of Bamboo (1955) Shimada played the uncle of Yoshiko Yamaguchi's lead character—the film also offered him his first chance to work together with his childhood idol Sessue Hayakawa. During this period, Shimada auditioned for the role of Sakini, an Okinawan interpreter, in the 1956 film version of the hit play The Teahouse of the August Moon, but was disappointed when Caucasian Hollywood star Marlon Brando was awarded the role.

One notable Shimada role during this period was in the low-budget feature Battle of the Coral Sea (1959). In it he plays Commander Mori, a Japanese naval officer of integrity who is tasked with interrogating his American prisoners. Abandoning torture, he tries using psychological methods to gain information from his captives. Mori displays sympathy for his victims but does not allow his feelings to interfere with his duty and loyalty to Japan.

A more positive role for Shimada was in independent producer Sam Fuller's 1959 drama Tokyo After Dark. There Shimada plays Sen-Sei, a blind instructor and mentor to the geisha Sumi who is a master of the Japanese musical instrument called the koto (in fact performed by Kimio Eto). Sumi brings her American boyfriend Bob, who has been accused of murder and is on the lam, to hide at Sen-Sei's house. Sen-Sei has a lengthy conversation with Bob, explains to him with kindness how badly he's been behaving, and persuades him to show faith in Japanese justice and his financée's love by surrendering himself to the authorities, rather than letting himself be smuggled out of the country.

In addition to his film roles, Shimada worked steadily in TV dramas during the "Golden Age of Television". Most notably, he played a lead role in The Kotaro Suto Story. In "The Pearl", an episode of the anthology series The Loretta Young Show, he appeared as a Japanese fisherman who finds a valuable pearl, but attempts to conceal this fact from his Japanese wife (played by Young). The program was so successful that "An Innocent Conspiracy", another episode with the same characters, was presented the following season. Shimada enjoyed the challenge of playing opposite Young, an experienced actress and former Oscar-winner, though he was generally ambivalent about working in television.

=== 1960s ===
During the 1960s, Shimada worked primarily in television guest spots, including one in the adventure series Voyage to the Bottom of the Sea (s2 e3). According to one of the show's actors, it was a difficult experience, as Shimada had trouble pronouncing English words, and was berated on the set by the show's producer, Irwin Allen. He also played a few film roles. He had a small part in James Clavell's drama The Sweet and the Bitter (filmed in 1962 but not released until 1967).

He also played a supporting role as Mr. Kurawa in the 1966 drama Walk, Don't Run. The film, set in Tokyo at the time of the 1964 Olympics, would become chiefly notable in film history as the final role of Hollywood star Cary Grant. Shimada made a different kind of notable film appearance as the narrator of the documentary "My Garden Japan", a film tour of notable public and private gardens around Japan that was screened regularly at the United Nations Pavilion at Montreal's Expo 67 World's Fair.

He also had a small but memorable role in the Adam West-starring Batman (1966), a feature film version of the television series of the same name. Shimada played a Japanese delegate to the "United World Security Council" (a thinly veiled analogue for the United Nations Security Council), whose mind is invariably swapped with one of his foreign colleagues.

=== You Only Live Twice ===
It was at this time, in early 1967, that Shimada won the role for which he would be best known, that of Mr. Osato in the James Bond film You Only Live Twice. Mr. Osato, an independently wealthy and well-respected Japanese businessman, runs Osato Chemicals, a chemical and engineering company that is in fact a front for the international crime syndicate SPECTRE.

When Bond (Sean Connery) comes to see him, the suave Osato politely warns him, "You should give up smoking. Cigarettes are very bad for your chest." Mr. Osato wishes Bond well as he departs his office, then waits a few seconds, turns to his "Confidential Secretary" Helga Brandt (Karin Dor) and utters the succinct icy command: "Kill him!"

Shimada acted the role with relish, and received positive media attention for it. Shooting took place in Japan, and Shimada returned to his homeland for the first time in nearly 50 years. Fuji TV filmed a program recording Shimada's visit to his childhood home of Mito.

=== Later career ===
In his later years, Shimada appeared on a number of episodes of popular television series, including I Spy, Mannix, Have Gun – Will Travel, The Doris Day Show, and The Six Million Dollar Man. One of his most notable appearances was in Hawaii Five-O. Shimada played Mr. Shigato, a millionaire Japanese businessman accused by three former prisoners of war of being the officer responsible for extreme physical and mental cruelty toward them during World War II.

== Retirement ==
Shimada retired in his 70s, and lived in Encino. He supported himself by buying and renting out an apartment complex.

== Personal life ==
Shimada never married (on the draft card he was issued in 1940, he listed Anna Snyder as "next-of-kin"). He became a U.S. citizen in 1954, and began receiving Social Security in 1970.

== Death ==
Shimada died on June 19, 1988, at his home in Encino. He is buried at Forest Lawn Cemetery.

== Filmography ==
- The Washington Masquerade (1932) - Japanese Dignitary (uncredited)
- The Night Club Lady (1932) - Ito Mura (uncredited)
- Gabriel Over the White House (1933) - Japanese Admiral at Debt Conference (uncredited)
- Midnight Club (1933) - Nishi (uncredited)
- Four Frightened People (1934) - Native
- Murder at the Vanities (1934) - Koto (uncredited)
- Charlie Chan's Courage (1934) - Jiu Jitsu Man
- Imitation of Life (1934) - Japanese Customer in Pancake Shop (uncredited)
- Bordertown (1935) - Law School Graduate (uncredited)
- Let 'Em Have It (1935) - Chinese Houseboy (uncredited)
- Public Hero#1 (1935) - Sam - Sonny's Japanese Houseboy (uncredited)
- Oil for the Lamps of China (1935) - Tea House Owner (uncredited)
- The Affair of Susan (1935) - Spieler (uncredited)
- Revolt of the Zombies (1936) - Buna
- White Legion (1936) - Dr. Nogi
- Mr. Moto's Last Warning (1939) - Fake Mr. Moto (uncredited)
- They Met in Bombay (1941) - Japanese Colonel (uncredited)
- Dragon Seed (1944) - Villager (uncredited)
- Tokyo Joe (1949) - Ito
- Emergency Wedding (1950) - Ho (uncredited)
- The War of the Worlds (1953) - Japanese Diplomat (uncredited)
- The Snow Creature (1954) - Subra
- The Bridges at Toko-Ri (1954) - Japanese Father (uncredited)
- House of Bamboo (1955) - Nagaya (uncredited)
- Navy Wife (1956) - Mayor Yoshida
- Battle Hymn (1957) - Korean Official
- The Delicate Delinquent (1957) - Togo's Japanese Interpreter (uncredited)
- Run Silent, Run Deep (1958) - Japanese Submarine Commander (uncredited)
- The Geisha Boy (1958) - Osakawa, Japanese Detective (uncredited)
- Tokyo After Dark (1959) - Sen-Sei
- Battle of the Coral Sea (1959) - Comm. Mori
- The Wackiest Ship in the Army (1961) - Maj. Samada
- The Horizontal Lieutenant (1962) - Master of Ceremonies at Show (uncredited)
- The Prize (1963) - Japanese Correspondent (uncredited)
- King Rat (1965) - The Japanese General
- One Spy Too Many (1966) - President Sing-Mok
- Walk Don't Run (1966) - Mr. Kurawa
- Batman (1966) - Japanese Delegate (uncredited)
- You Only Live Twice (1967) - Mr. Osato
- The Sweet and the Bitter (1967) - Tom Hirata
- The Hardy Boys: The Mystery of the Chinese Junk (1967) - Mr. Pan
- Which Way to the Front? (1970) - Japanese Naval Officer (uncredited)
