= Donald Henderson Clarke =

American writer and journalist

Donald Henderson Clarke (August 24, 1887 – March 27, 1958) was an American writer and journalist, known for his romantic novels, mystery fiction, and screenplays.

== Biography ==
Clarke was born August 24, 1887, in South Hadley, Massachusetts. He studied at Harvard but was twice dismissed. He spent his early career as a reporter, working for the New York World, The New York Times and the New York American. He started writing racy books about gangsters and women of easy vitue. His publisher, Vanguard Press, estimated he sold over 8 million books. His book Louis Beretti (1929), about a bootlegger, was made into the film Born Reckless (1930). Impatient Virgin (1931) was also filmed as The Impatient Maiden (1932). His book Female (1933) was ruled obscene.

He died March 27, 1958, in Delray Beach, Florida.

== Bibliography ==
=== Novels ===
- Louis Beretti (1929) Also published as Louis Beretti: The Story of a Gunman.(A. A. Knopf: London, 1930.)
  - Basis of his screenplay for the 1930 film, Born Reckless
  - Translated into French as Louis Beret (1933) and as Un nommé Louis Beretti (1949)
  - Translated into German as Louis Beretti (1933)
  - Translated into Spanish as Un hombre llamado Louis Beretti (1981)
- In the Reign of Rothstein (1929)
  - Review, by Helen Gregory MacGill American Journal of Sociology, Sep., 1931, vol. 37, no. 2, p. 345
- Millie (1930)
  - Basis of the 1931 film Millie
- Impatient Virgin (1931)
  - Filmed as The Impatient Maiden (1932)
  - Translated into Czech as Nedočkavá panna : Román dívky (1933) OCLC 85513940
  - Translated into German as Ruth, die es nicht erwarten kann (1933) OCLC 72099467
- Young and Healthy (1931)
- John Bartel, Jr. (1932)
- Female (1933)
  - Basis of the 1933 film Female
  - Translated into Czech as Samička : Román ženy (1934)
- Pilgrimage (1933)
  - Basis of the 1933 film Pilgrimage
- Alabama (1934)
  - Translated into Czech as Missis Alabam (1934)
- Kelly (1935)
- Lady Ann (1935)
- Nina (1935)
- Confidential (1936)
  - Translated into French as Strictement confidentiel (1981)
- Millie's Daughter (1939)
  - Basis of 1947 film Millie's Daughter and of the 1956 episode "Millie's Daughter" in Lux Video Theater
- A Lady Named Lou (1946)
  - Translated into Dutch as Lou, een vrouw met temperament (1949)
- Tawny (1946)
- The Chastity of Gloria Boyd (1946)
- The Housekeeper's Daughter (1947)
  - Basis of the 1939 film The Housekeeper's Daughter
- That Mrs. Renney. (1947)
- Regards to Broadway (1947)
- The Regenerate Lover (1948)
- Murderer's Holiday (1948) translated into French as Berretti pas mort! (1953)
- Joe and Jennie (1949)
- Kelly, etc. (1960)
- 青春の秘密 / Seishun no himitsu (Secret of Youth) Chinese translation of ?? (1951)
- Address mezarlık (Address Cemetery) Turkish translation of ?? (1981)

=== Screenplays ===
- Born Reckless (1930 film) from his novel of the same name
- The Women Men Marry (1937) from story by Matt Taylor
- The Ghost Ship (1943 film) from story by Leo Mittler

== Autobiography ==
- Man of the World; Recollections of an Irreverent Reporter (1951)
  - Reviewed in the New York Times Book Review,
