= Arsène Lupin Returns =

1938 film by George Fitzmaurice

- Theatrical release poster
- Directed by: George Fitzmaurice
- Screenplay by: James Kevin McGuinness; Howard Emmett Rogers; George Harmon Coxe
- Story by: James Kevin McGuinness; Howard Emmett Rogers; George Harmon Coxe
- Based on: L’Aiguille creuse ("The Hollow Needle"); 1909 novel by Maurice Leblanc
- Produced by: John W. Considine Jr.
- Starring: Melvyn Douglas; Virginia Bruce; Warren William; John Halliday; Nat Pendleton; Monty Woolley
- Cinematography: George J. Folsey
- Edited by: Ben Lewis
- Music by: Franz Waxman
- Production company: Metro-Goldwyn-Mayer
- Distributed by: Loew's Inc.
- Release date: February 25, 1938
- Running time: 81 minutes
- Country: United States
- Language: English

Arsène Lupin Returns is a 1938 American mystery film directed by George Fitzmaurice and written by James Kevin McGuinness, Howard Emmett Rogers, and George Harmon Coxe. The film stars Melvyn Douglas, Virginia Bruce, Warren William, John Halliday, Nat Pendleton, and Monty Woolley. The film was released on February 25, 1938 by Metro-Goldwyn-Mayer.

== Plot ==
After being asked to resign from the FBI, a publicity-hungry detective goes into private business. His first job is to protect a very precious jewel belonging to the Grissac family, which is the object of a failed robbery attempt in New York City. When he accompanies the Grissacs back to France, he encounters a friend of the family, Rene Farrand, who he rapidly comes to suspect is the master thief Arsène Lupin, someone believed to have been killed several years before.

== Cast ==
- Melvyn Douglas as Rene Farrand
- Virginia Bruce as Lorraine de Grissac
- Warren William as Steve Emerson
- John Halliday as Count de Grissac
- Nat Pendleton as Joe Doyle
- Monty Woolley as Georges Bouchet
- E. E. Clive as Alf
- George Zucco as Prefect of Police
- Rollo Lloyd as Duval
- Vladimir Sokoloff as Ivan Pavloff
- Ian Wolfe (credited as Ien Wulf) as Le Marchand
- Tully Marshall as Monelle
- Jonathan Hale as F.B.I. Special Agent

== Bibliography ==
- Backer, Ron. Mystery Movie Series of 1930s Hollywood. McFarland, 2012.
