= The Crash (1932 film) =

1932 film

- Directed by: William Dieterle
- Screenplay by: Earl Baldwin; Larry Barretto
- Based on: Children of Pleasure; 1932 novel by Larry Barretto
- Produced by: Raymond Griffith
- Starring: Ruth Chatterton; George Brent
- Cinematography: Ernest Haller
- Edited by: Owen Marks
- Production company: First National
- Distributed by: Warner Bros. Pictures
- Release date: October 9, 1932
- Running time: 58 minutes
- Country: United States
- Language: English

The Crash is a 1932 American pre-Code drama film directed by William Dieterle. The film is based on the 1932 novel Children of Pleasure written by Larry Barretto, and stars Ruth Chatterton as a luxury-loving wife devastated by the Wall Street crash of 1929.

== Plot ==
Linda Gault comes from a poverty-stricken family and is determined never to be poor again. She is now a philandering elitist who casually seduces men for their money. Her stockbroker husband Geoffrey has found out about his wife's infidelities, and encourages her to collect investment recommendations from her latest lover, high-profile financier John Fair. Linda is unamused with her husband's desire, claiming that finances have killed their loving marriage. Nevertheless, she does as her husband asks, and afterwards feels ashamed about it.

Having tired of Fair, she breaks off their affair. Unaware of this, Geoffrey insists she get the latest inside information from Fair, as the stock market is behaving very strangely. Suspicious of Linda's rapid about face, Fair refuses to tell her anything. Not wanting to admit that she was unable to charm her ex-lover, Linda lies to her husband, telling him the market will rise. As a result, Geoffrey loses all of his money in the Wall Street crash of 1929. Unwilling to deal with being impoverished, Linda persuades her husband to pay for her extended stay in Bermuda, using some of the money he needs to try to recover.

There, she is romanced by Ronnie Sanderson, an Australian sheep rancher. Ronnie proposes that Linda live with him in Australia, but she hesitates to, feeling Australia has nothing to offer her. However, when she learns about her husband having become broke, she is eager to profit from Ronnie in every way possible. Linda is able to manipulate Ronnie into falling for her and he expresses his interest in marrying her if she first returns to New York City to divorce her husband.

Once in New York and announcing the divorce, Geoffrey reacts in laughter, telling her she will never marry a sheep rancher. Meanwhile, Linda's maid Celeste steals Linda's jewelry to save her boyfriend Arthur from jail. Linda now realizes she is completely broke and lands a job as a clothing store's clerk. She is surprised by a visit from Ronnie, who insists on taking her to Australia immediately. Geoffrey, who is not willing to let go his wife, warns Ronnie about Linda's spoiled character, but Ronnie does not feel threatened.

On the evening Linda is leaving, Geoffrey confronts Fair with losing all of his money because of Fair's supposed statement to Linda. They initially quarrel, but in the end, Geoffrey receives some of the money he lost as a loan. Back home, he receives a visit from Linda, who has come to say goodbye. They realize the faults they have made in the past and are reconciled. Linda tears up Fair's check.

== Cast ==
- Ruth Chatterton as Linda Gault
- George Brent as Geoffrey Gault
- Lois Wilson as Marcia Peterson
- Barbara Leonard as Celeste, the maid
- Paul Cavanagh as Ronald 'Ronnie' Sanderson
- Henry Kolker as John 'Jack' Fair
- Hardie Albright as Arthur Pringle
- Ivan F. Simpson as Hodge, the butler
- Skippy as Dog eating bone in kitchen

== Home media ==
It is available on DVD from the Warner Archive Collection paired as a double feature with Registered Nurse.
