= Millie (film) =

1931 film

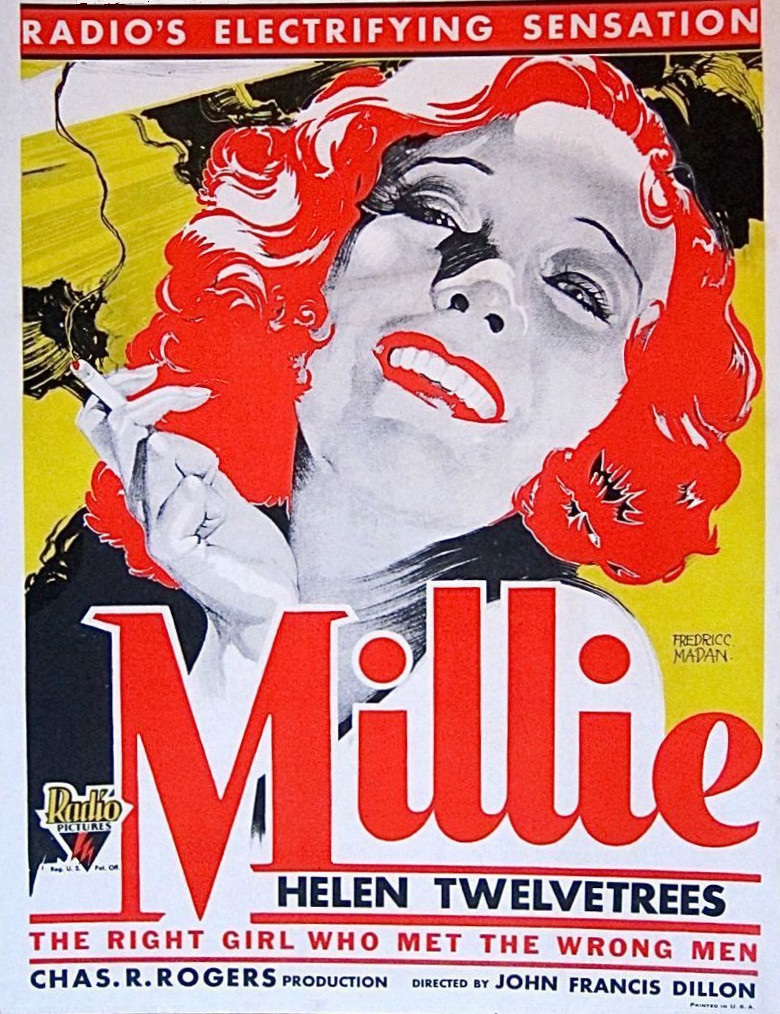
- Theatrical release poster
- Directed by: John Francis Dillon
- Written by: Charles Kenyon; Ralph Morgan
- Based on: Millie; 1930 novel by Donald Henderson Clarke
- Produced by: Charles R. Rogers; Harry Joe Brown (assoc.)
- Starring: Helen Twelvetrees
- Cinematography: Ernest Haller
- Edited by: Fred Allen
- Music by: Arthur Lange; Nacio Herb Brown
- Production company: RKO Radio Pictures
- Distributed by: RKO Radio Pictures
- Release dates: February 6, 1931 (Premiere-New York City); February 8, 1931 (US)
- Running time: 85 minutes
- Country: United States
- Language: English

Millie is a 1931 American pre-Code drama film directed by John Francis Dillon from a screenplay by Charles Kenyon and Ralph Morgan, based on a novel of the same name by Donald Henderson Clarke. The film was an independent production by Charles R. Rogers, distributed by RKO Radio Pictures, after their acquisition of Pathé Exchange. It stars Helen Twelvetrees in one of her best roles, with a supporting cast that includes Lilyan Tashman, James Hall, Joan Blondell, John Halliday and Anita Louise.

== Plot ==
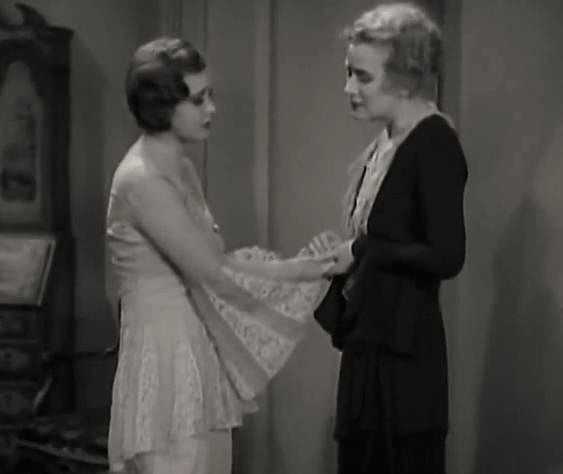
Helen Twelvetrees (left) and Charlotte Walker in Millie

Millie (1931) by John Francis Dillon

Millie is a naïve young woman who marries a wealthy man from New York, Jack Maitland. Three years later, unhappy in her marriage due to her husband's continued infidelity, she asks for and receives a divorce. Because of her pride, she does not want his money, but she also does not want to deprive her daughter of a comfortable lifestyle. She allows Jack and his mother to retain custody of her daughter Connie.

Focusing on her career, she rises through the hierarchy of the hotel where she is employed, shunning the attention of the rich banker Jimmy Damier, preferring the attentions of the reporter Tommy Rock, although, due to her prior sour relationship, she refuses to marry him. Eventually, Millie is promoted to the head of operations for the hotel. At the same time, Tommy is offered a lucrative position at the bank by Damier as a favor to Millie. However, at the celebration party, Millie discovers that Tommy, just like Maitland, is cheating on her.

Betrayed a second time, Millie becomes very bitter. With her female cohorts, Helen and Angie, she becomes a woman who loves a good time, floating from man to man. This goes on for several years, until she hears that Damier has taken an interest in her teen-age daughter, Connie, who bears a striking resemblance to her. Millie warns Damier to leave her daughter alone, but, although he promises to stay away from Connie, he ignores Millie's warning and takes Connie to a remote lodge to groom her. Millie is tipped off, goes to the lodge with a gun, confronts Jimmy and kills him.

In the ensuing murder trial, Millie tries to keep her daughter's name out of the press and claims not to remember why she shot Jimmy. She says that another woman ran out of the lodge after the shot, but claims that she did not see who the woman was and has no idea as to her identity. The prosecution thus claims that Millie's motive was jealousy of Jimmy's romantic relationship with this unknown other woman. Millie's friends, however, help to bring out the truth, and when the jury finds out that Millie's true motive was to protect her daughter from Jimmy's lascivious intentions, they acquit her. In the end, Millie is reunited with her daughter and her estranged husband's family.

== Cast ==
- Helen Twelvetrees as Millie Blake Maitland
- Lilyan Tashman as Helen Riley
- Robert Ames as Tommy Rock
- James Hall as Jack Maitland
- John Halliday as Jimmy Damier
- Joan Blondell as Angie Wickerstaff
- Anita Louise as Connie Maitland
- Edmund Breese as Bob O'Fallon
- Frank McHugh as Johnny Holmes
- Charlotte Walker as Mrs Maitland
- Franklin Parker as Spring
- Charles Delaney as Mike
- Harry Stubbs as Mark Marks

(Cast as per AFI's database)

== Production ==
Donald Henderson Clarke finished his novel Millie during summer 1930. The novel was first offered to Metro-Goldwyn-Mayer, who passed on it due to its racy content. In August of that year, it was reported that Charles R. Rogers had purchased the film rights to the novel, and had signed Charles Kenyon to adapt it into a screenplay, as well as selecting John Francis Dillon to direct. Although Rogers had signed an agreement to distribute his independent films through RKO, it was reported that he would be overseeing the production on the Universal lot. Even though he incorrectly was identified as "Ralph Murphy", Ralph Morgan was signed to collaborate with Kenyon on the screenplay adaptation in September. Less than a week later, Helen Twelvetrees signed on for the titular role; and it was reported that the screenplay adaptation had been completed. Rogers would choose Ernest Haller to shoot the film and sign him for the project in the beginning of October.

In January, RKO announced the film would be released in February, and it was released on February 8, 1931.

== Notes ==
The film was an independent production by Charles Rogers, but became the property of RKO when Rogers agreed to become its production chief.

The theme song "Millie" had words and music by Nacio Herb Brown.

In 1959, the film entered the public domain in the United States because the claimants did not renew its copyright registration in the 28th year after publication.

The film's tagline was "Torn from Her Arms ... Child of Love a Woman Can Give but Once."
