= Hell-Ship Morgan =

1936 film

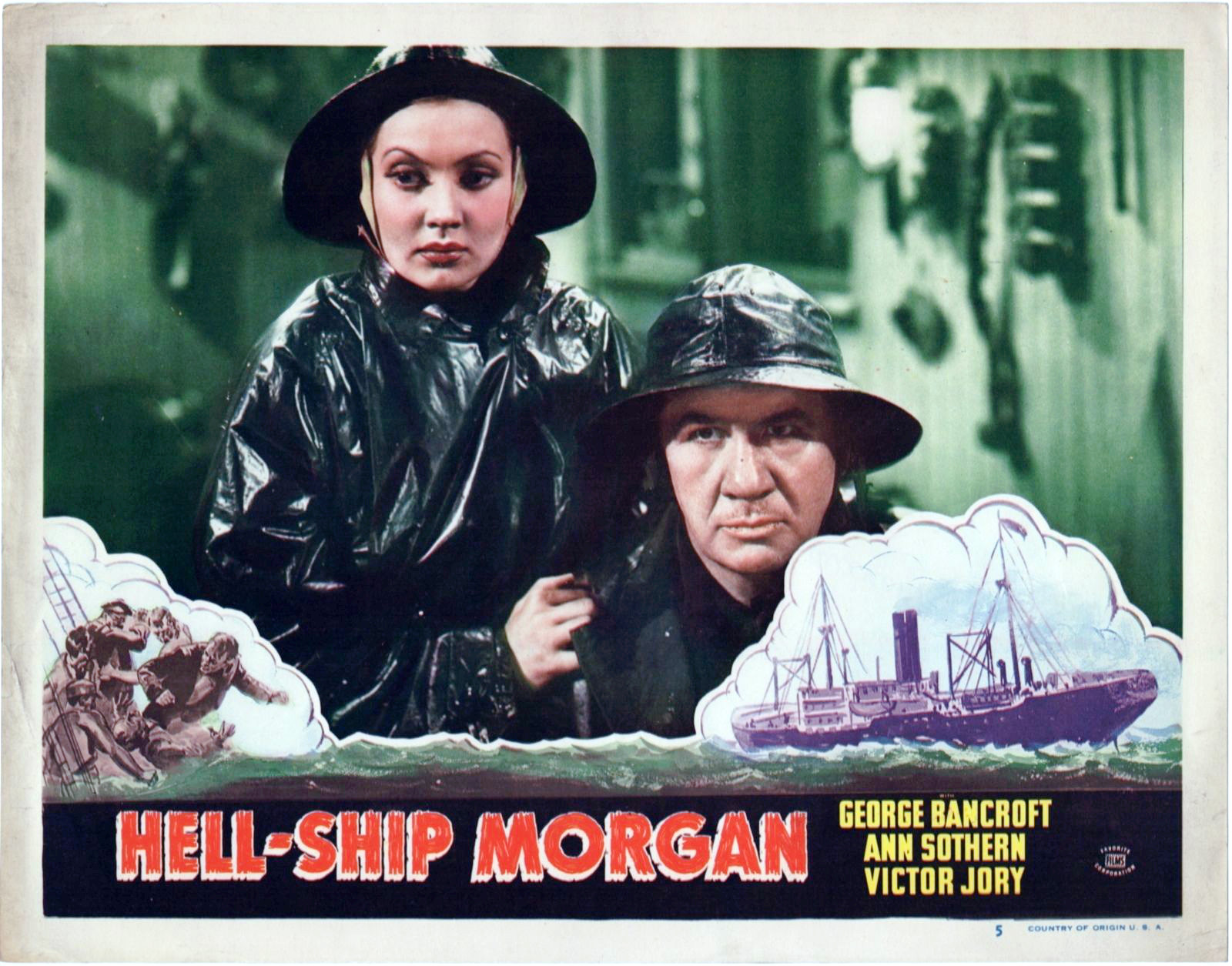
- Lobby card
- Directed by: D. Ross Lederman
- Written by: Harold Shumate
- Produced by: Irving Briskin
- Starring: George Bancroft; Ann Sothern; Victor Jory
- Cinematography: Henry Freulich
- Edited by: Otto Meyer
- Distributed by: Columbia Pictures
- Release date: February 8, 1936
- Running time: 65 minutes
- Country: United States
- Language: English

Hell-Ship Morgan is a 1936 American romantic drama film directed by D. Ross Lederman and written by Harold Shumate.

== Cast ==
- George Bancroft as Captain Ira 'Hell-Ship' Morgan
- Ann Sothern as Mary Taylor
- Victor Jory as Jim Allen
- George Regas as Covanci
- Howard Hickman as Cabot
- Ralph Byrd as Dale
- Rollo Lloyd as Hawkins
- Fred Toones as Ship Cook Pittsburgh
- Harry Bradley as Minister
- Helen Lynch as Waterfront Cafe Girl
