= Rollo Lloyd =

American actor

- Born: March 22, 1883; Akron, Ohio
- Died: July 24, 1938 (aged 55); Los Angeles, California
- Occupation: Actor

Rollo Lloyd (March 22, 1883 – July 24, 1938) was an American actor who appeared in about 65 films. His films include Today We Live, Strictly Personal, The Lives of a Bengal Lancer, Mad Love, Magnificent Obsession, The Devil-Doll, Anthony Adverse, Seventh Heaven, Armored Car, The Last Train from Madrid, Souls at Sea and The Lady in the Morgue, among others.

In 1920, Lloyd was selected as the Director and a leading actor for the summer at the Elitch Theatre. He was tasked with hiring the summer stock cast and selecting the plays for the season.

== Partial filmography ==
- Midnight at Maxim's (1915) - Mr. Shye
- The Call of the Dance (1915) - Brace - Fisk's Lieutenant
- Pals First (1918) - The Squirrel
- Prestige (1931) - Capt. Emil de Fontenac
- Okay, America! (1932) - Joe Morton
- Flaming Gold (1932) - Harry Banning
- Laughter in Hell (1933) - Zeb
- Today We Live (1933) - Major
- Strictly Personal (1933) - Jerry O'Conner
- Destination Unknown (1933) - Dr. Fram
- Out All Night (1933) - David Arnold
- Carnival Lady (1933) - Harry
- Sitting Pretty (1933) - Film Director (uncredited)
- Madame Spy (1934) - Baum
- Private Scandal (1934) - Insurance Agent Henry Lane
- Whom the Gods Destroy (1934) - Henry Braverman
- The Party's Over (1934) - Fred (uncredited)
- The Man Who Reclaimed His Head (1934) - Jean - de Marnay's Butler (uncredited)
- The Lives of a Bengal Lancer (1935) - The Ghasi - a Prisoner (uncredited)
- The Gilded Lily (1935) - City Editor (uncredited)
- The Mystery Man (1935) - Reporter (uncredited)
- Murder on a Honeymoon (1935) - Hotel Clerk (uncredited)
- Bride of Frankenstein (1935) - Neighbor (uncredited)
- Mad Love (1935) - Varsac - Fingerprint Expert (uncredited)
- Hot Tip (1935) - Henry Crumm
- His Night Out (1935) - Dryer (uncredited)
- Barbary Coast (1935) - Wigham
- Professional Soldier (1935) - Cabinet Member
- Magnificent Obsession (1935) - Panhandle Pete (uncredited)
- I Conquer the Sea! (1936) - (uncredited)
- Hell-Ship Morgan (1936) - Hawkins
- Desire (1936) - Clerk to Perform Wedding (uncredited)
- The Ex-Mrs. Bradford (1936) - North's 'Landlord' (717 Cosicosco St.) (uncredited)
- Parole! (1936) - Butcher (uncredited)
- The Devil-Doll (1936) - Detective
- Anthony Adverse (1936) - Napoleon Bonaparte
- Straight from the Shoulder (1936) - Mr. Blake
- Yellowstone (1936) - Franklin Ross
- White Legion (1936) - The Colonel
- The Man I Marry (1936) - Woody Ryan
- Come and Get It (1936) - Train Steward (uncredited)
- Love Letters of a Star (1936) - Sigurd Repellen
- The Accusing Finger (1936) - Dr. Simms
- Four Days' Wonder (1936) - The Tramp
- History Is Made at Night (1937) - Reservations Man at Victor's (uncredited)
- Seventh Heaven (1937) - Matoot
- Girl Loves Boy (1937) - Dr. Williams
- Armored Car (1937) - Organist
- The Last Train from Madrid (1937) - Hernandez (uncredited)
- The Emperor's Candlesticks (1937) - Jailer (uncredited)
- Souls at Sea (1937) - Parchy (uncredited)
- The Women Men Marry (1937) - Peter Martin
- Partners in Crime (1937) - Ex-Convict (uncredited)
- The Westland Case (1937) - Amos Sprague
- Stand-In (1937) - Scriptwriter (uncredited)
- Night Spot (1937) - Vail
- Arsène Lupin Returns (1938) - Duval
- Goodbye Broadway (1938) - Merriweather
- The Lady in the Morgue (1938) - Coroner
- The Saint in New York (1938) - Bartender (uncredited)
- Crime Ring (1938) - Mr. E.J. Goshen (uncredited)
- Smashing the Rackets (1938) - Sam Schwartz - Butcher (uncredited)
- Spawn of the North (1938) - Fisherman (uncredited) (final film role)
