= The Housekeeper's Daughter =

1939 film by Hal Roach

- Directed by: Hal Roach
- Written by: Rian James; Gordon Douglas; Jack Jevne (uncredited); Claude Martin (uncredited)
- Based on: The Housekeeper's Daughter; 1938 novel by Donald Henderson Clarke
- Produced by: Hal Roach
- Starring: Joan Bennett; Adolphe Menjou; John Hubbard; William Gargan; George E. Stone; Peggy Wood; Donald Meek; Victor Mature
- Cinematography: Norbert Brodine
- Edited by: William H. Ziegler
- Music by: Amedeo De Filippi; Lucien Moraweck
- Production company: Hal Roach Studios
- Distributed by: United Artists
- Release date: October 26, 1939
- Running time: 80 minutes
- Country: United States
- Language: English
- Box office: $713,437

The Housekeeper's Daughter is a 1939 comedy/drama film directed and produced by Hal Roach. The film stars Joan Bennett, Adolphe Menjou and John Hubbard. The screenplay was written by Rian James, Gordon Douglas, Jack Jevne and Claude Martin, based on a novel by Donald Henderson Clarke.

The Housekeeper's Daughter was the film debut of Victor Mature.

== Plot ==
Hilda Kreemhild is the girlfriend of a mobster named Floyd. Her mother Olga works as the housekeeper for the educated Randall Family. Tired of being around Floyd, Hilda goes to visit her mother. Meanwhile, Professor and Mrs. Randall leave on vacation, leaving their adult son Robert at home., where he meets Hilda. Robert's ambition is to become a reporter.

Meanwhile, Floyd is upset that Hilda has left him. He forces a showgirl, Gladys Fontaine, to accompany him to his houseboat. Benny the flower vendor sees Gladys being taken away by Floyd and decides to follow them. Fearing for Gladys' life and angry at Floyd, Benny sneaks aboard the boat and poisons Floyd's cup of coffee. However, Gladys drinks it instead and dies of poisoning. A horrified Benny watches Floyd tosses Gladys' body into the river.

The next morning, Robert reads about Gladys' death and decides to cover the story. He attaches himself to ace criminal reporter Deakon Maxwell and photographer Ed O'Malley. At a police interrogation session, they witness Benny confess to Gladys' murder. Taking pity on Berry, Robert befriends him.

After a night of drinking with Deakon and Ed, Benny reveals that Gladys was thrown from a houseboat. Robert then phones in the story to the newspaper. Waking up the next morning with a hangover, Robert has no memory of the evening's events. However, he is informed that his story on Glady scooped the other newspapers and that he is being hailed as a hero.

After reading Robert's story, Floyd thinks that Robert saw him dump Gladys' body off the houseboat. He orders his gang to go to the Randall house and murder him. However, Robert, Deakon, Ed and Benny learn about the plot. Benny poisons the gangsters' coffee. As the gang approaches the house, Deakon and Ed shoot fireworks from the roof, convincing the gangsters that it is gunfire. and, believing that the fireworks are the sound of gunshots, the gangsters open fire. At the same time, the gangster start dropping due to the poisoned coffee. The police finally arrive to the rescue. At the end of the film, Robert announces his engagement to Hilda

== Cast ==
- Joan Bennett as Hilda Kreemhild
- Adolphe Menjou as Deakon Maxwell
- John Hubbard as Robert Randall
- William Gargan as Ed O'Malley
- George E. Stone as Benny
- Peggy Wood as Olga Kreemhild
- Donald Meek as Editor Wilson
- Marc Lawrence as Floyd
- Lilian Bond as Gladys Fontaine
- Victor Mature as Lefty
- John Hyams as Professor Randall
- Leila McIntyre as Mrs. Randall
- Luis Alberni as Tony Veroni
- Rosina Galli as Mrs. Veroni
- Tom Dugan as Gangster
- Gene Morgan as Gangster

== Production ==
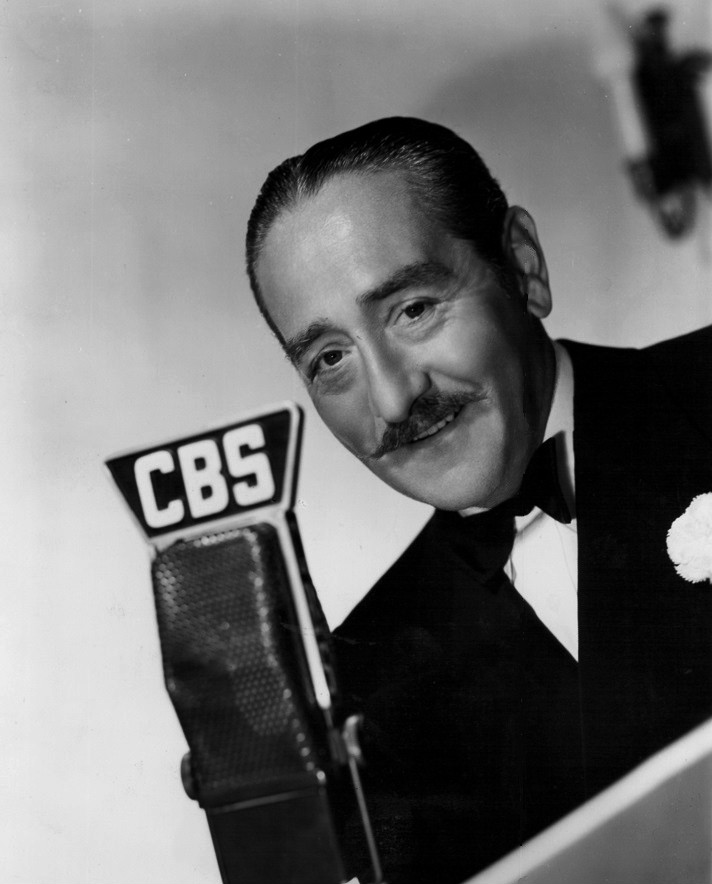
Adolphe Menjou as Deakon Maxwell

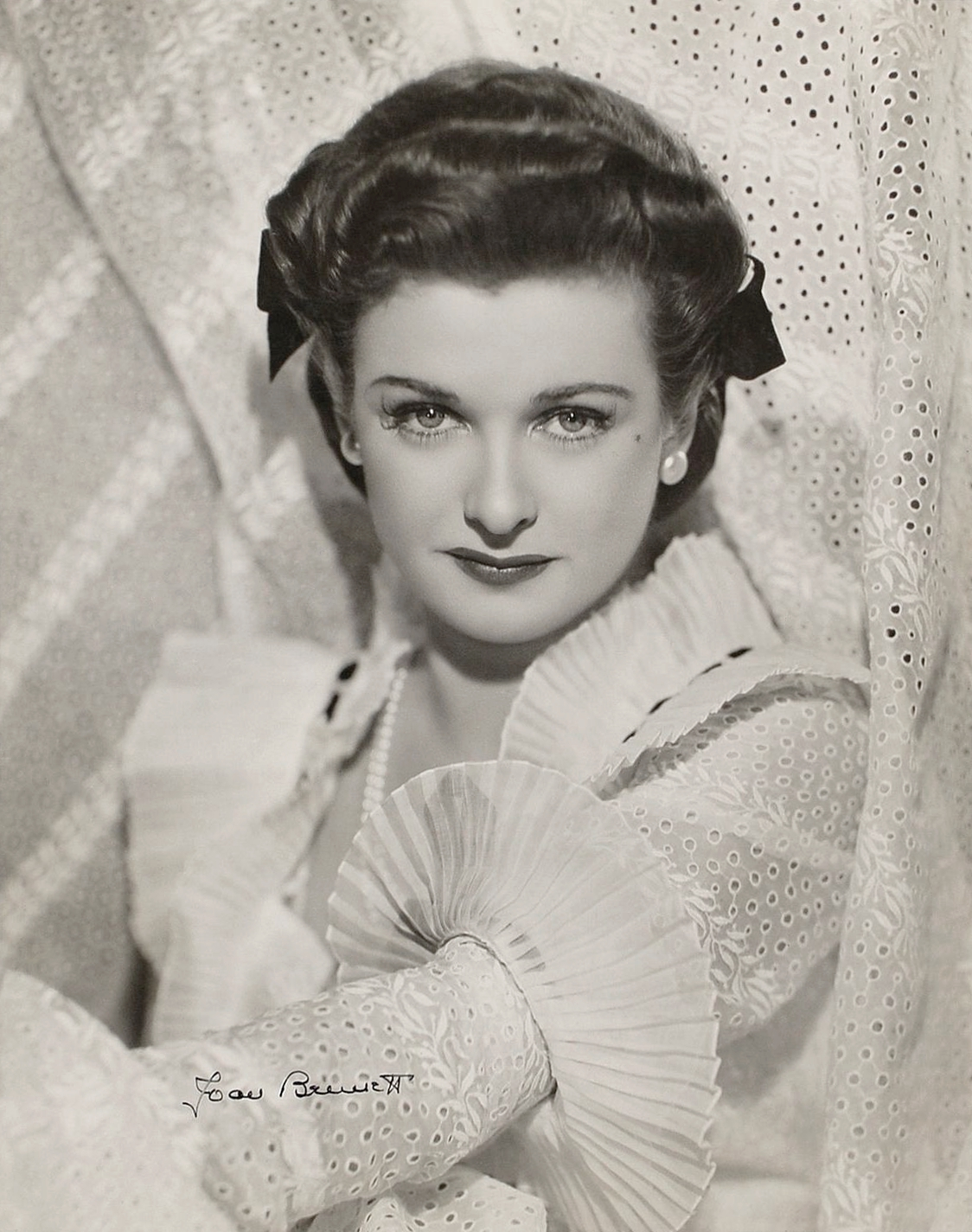
Joan Bennett as Hilda Kreemhild

The Housekeeper's Daughter film was based on a novel, The Housekeeper's Daughter by Donald Henderson Clarke, published in 1938. The New York Times said the book had a "good mystery" and "delightful love story."The film rights to the novel were bought by Hal Roach. Sigrid Gurie was discussed as a possible lead. In December 1938, Jack Jevne was reportedly working on the script.

Roach tried to get Lee Tracy in the film. The role of Robert Randall eventually went to [John Hubbard] and Joan Bennett was given the female lead. By May 1939, Rian James was working on the script.

The Housekeeper's Daughter was the first of a five-picture deal between Roach and United Artists (UA). In June 1939, UA announced Roach would direct the film and Joan Bennett and Peggy Wood would star in it. Victor Mature was cast in a supporting role after being spotted in a stage play, To Quito and Back. He impressed Roach so much that Roach cast Mature in the lead for One Million Years B.C.

== Reception ==
The Los Angeles Times said the The Housekeeper's Daughter,

"bears the earmarks of a flicker from the early 1920s. Its characters are two dimensional its continuity hit and miss and its action fast and foolish."

The Housekeeper's Daughter initially did not perform well at the box office. Roach and United Artists launched a new marketing campaign that played up the more salacious aspects of the story. It used ad lines like "the housekeeper's daughter did things she hadn't oughter." This marketing approach annoyed Bennett, who threatened to sue the studio if Roach did not change it. Roach refused any changes. Bennett then wrote to 3,000 women's clubs, arguing she had been maligned in the advertising. She asked the women to boycott the film. However, the resulting publicity helped make the film a box office success.

In 1957, it was announced Hal Roach Jr. would remake The Housekeeper's Daughter as a musical. However this never happened.
