= The Women Men Marry =

1937 film by Errol Taggart

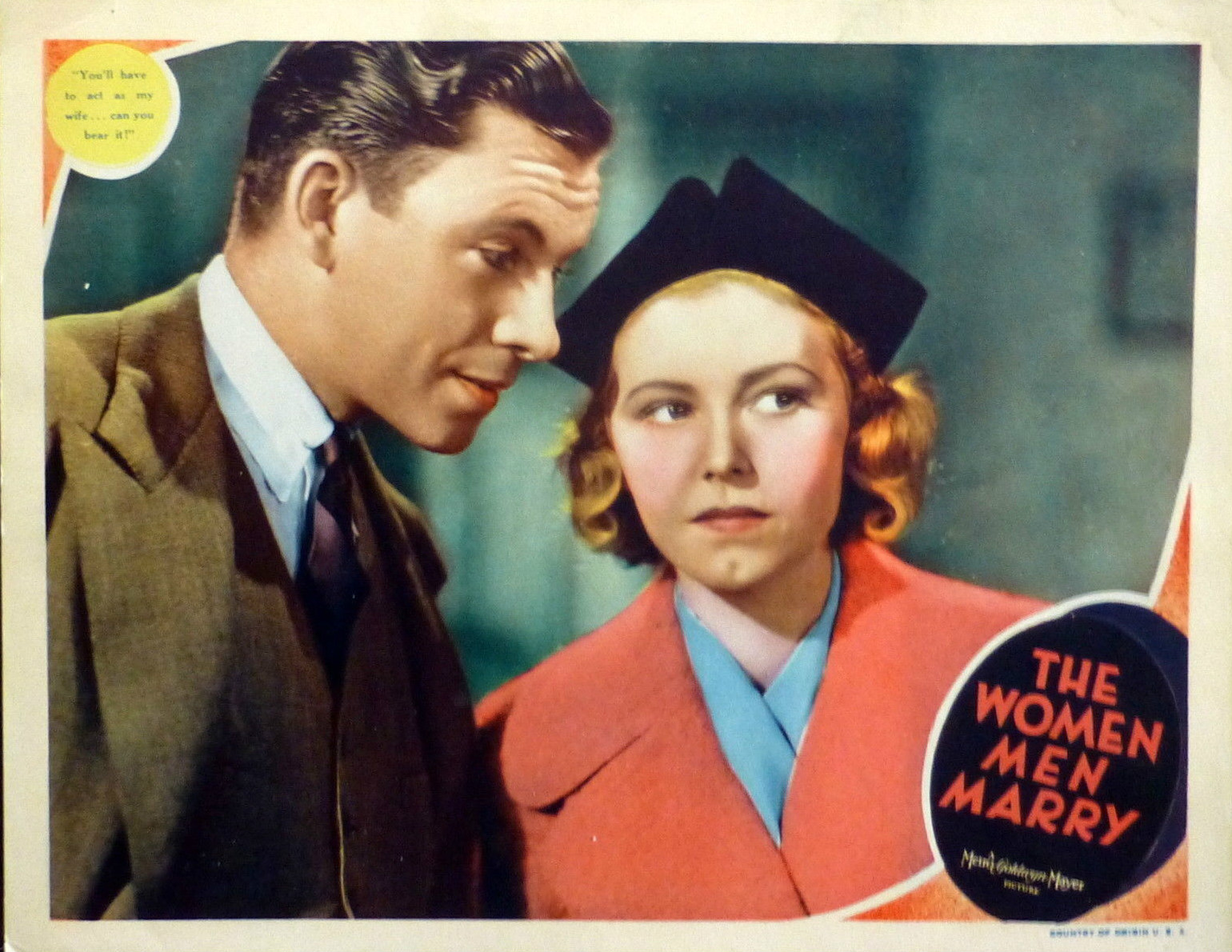
- Lobby card featuring George Murphy and Josephine Hutchinson
- Directed by: Errol Taggart
- Written by: Harry Ruskin; Donald Henderson Clarke; James Edward Grant
- Based on: story by Matt Taylor
- Produced by: Michael Fessier
- Starring: George Murphy; Josephine Hutchinson
- Cinematography: Lester White
- Edited by: George Boemler
- Music by: Edward Ward
- Production company: Metro-Goldwyn-Mayer
- Distributed by: Loew's Inc.
- Release date: September 10, 1937
- Running time: 61 minutes; 6 reels
- Country: United States
- Language: English

The Women Men Marry is a 1937 American drama film directed by Errol Taggart and starring George Murphy, Josephine Hutchinson, Claire Dodd and Toby Wing. The film's script is credited to Donald Henderson Clarke.

== Cast ==
- George Murphy as Bill Raeburn
- Josephine Hutchinson as Jane Carson
- Claire Dodd as Claire Raeburn
- Sidney Blackmer as Walter Wiley
- Cliff Edwards as Jerry Little
- John Wray as Brother Nameless
- Peggy Ryan as Mary Jane
- Helen Jerome Eddy as Sister Martin
- Rollo Lloyd as Peter Martin
- Edward McWade as Brother Lamb
- Toby Wing as Sugar
- Leonard Penn as Quinn
- Walter Walker as "Pop"
- Donald Douglas as Auctioneer McVey
- Winifred Harris as Dowager
- Charles Dunbar as Taxi driver
- Margaret Bert as Wiley's Secretary
- James Blaine as Timothy
- Edwin Stanley as Charley
- Hooper Atchley as Arnold, Wiley's
