= Lionel Pape =

English actor (1877–1944)

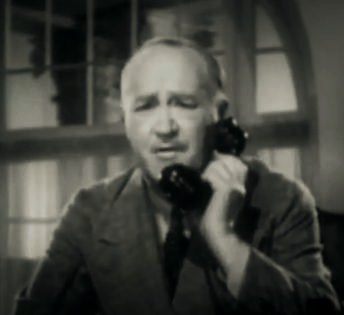
- in Eternally Yours (1939)
- Born: Edward Lionel Pape; 17 April 1877; Brighton, Sussex, England
- Died: 21 October 1944 (aged 67); Woodland Hills, California, U.S.
- Years active: 1915-1942

Edward Lionel Pape (17 April 1877 – 21 October 1944) was an English-born stage and screen actor. His acting career begun in his native UK with eventual migration to the US. He appeared on the Broadway stage in over 20 productions between 1912 and 1935. The beginning of his screen career goes back to the silent film era. Between the 1930s and early 1940s, he played supporting roles and bit parts in over 50 Hollywood movies. He played in numerous films of directors like John Ford, Ernst Lubitsch and George Cukor. Pape portrayed Katharine Hepburn's butler in The Philadelphia Story (1940) and appeared as the oppressive coal mine owner in How Green Was My Valley (1941).

== Partial filmography ==
- The Pursuing Shadow (1915) - Viscount Acheson
- Evidence (1915) - Bertie Stavely
- Flame of Passion (1915)
- The Pearl of the Antilles (1915) - Murray Carson
- The Sporting Duchess (1920) - Captain Cyprian Streatfield
- The Fatal Hour (1920) - The Duke of Exmoor
- The New York Idea (1920) - Sir Wilfrid Darby
- Nobody (1921) - Noron Ailsworth
- Two for Tonight (1935) - Lord Ralston (uncredited)
- The Man Who Broke the Bank at Monte Carlo (1935) - Third Assistant Director
- Sylvia Scarlett (1935) - Sergeant Major (uncredited)
- Little Lord Fauntleroy (1936) - Party Guest (uncredited)
- The White Angel (1936) - War Minister (uncredited)
- Mary of Scotland (1936) - Burghley
- White Legion (1936) - Dr. Travis
- A Woman Rebels (1936) - William C. White (uncredited)
- Camille (1936) - General (uncredited)
- Beloved Enemy (1936) - Crump
- The Plough and the Stars (1936) - Englishman (uncredited)
- The King and the Chorus Girl (1937) - Prof. Kornish
- The Prince and the Pauper (1937) - Second Lord
- Slave Ship (1937) - Commander (uncredited)
- Wee Willie Winkie (1937) - Maj. Allardyce
- The Emperor's Candlesticks (1937) - 210£ Bidder (uncredited)
- Saratoga (1937) - Horse Owner at Party (uncredited)
- Angel (1937) - Lord Davington (uncredited)
- Man-Proof (1938) - Man Cracking Nuts (uncredited)
- Outside of Paradise (1938) - Mr. Stonewall
- The Big Broadcast of 1938 (1938) - Lord Droopy
- Bluebeard's Eighth Wife (1938) - Monsieur Potin
- Fools for Scandal (1938) - Photographer (uncredited)
- The Rage of Paris (1938) - Uncle Josephus (uncredited)
- The Young in Heart (1938) - Wombat Customer (uncredited)
- Booloo (1938) - 2nd Governor
- Midnight (1939) - Edouart (uncredited)
- The Hound of the Baskervilles (1939) - Coroner
- It Could Happen to You (1939) - Alumni Member (uncredited)
- 5th Ave Girl (1939) - Mr. Pape - Man in Nightclub (uncredited)
- Rio (1939) - Jeweler (uncredited)
- Eternally Yours (1939) - Mr. Howard
- Drums Along the Mohawk (1939) - General (uncredited)
- Rulers of the Sea (1939) - First Secretary (uncredited)
- Raffles (1939) - Lord Melrose
- Congo Maisie (1940) - British Consul
- Zanzibar (1940) - Michael Drayton
- Cross-Country Romance (1940) - Miller - Mrs. North's Butler (uncredited)
- The Long Voyage Home (1940) - Mr. Clifton (uncredited)
- Arise, My Love (1940) - Lord Kettlebrook
- A Dispatch from Reuter's (1940) - Stock Exchange Chairman (uncredited)
- Tin Pan Alley (1940) - Lord Stanley
- The Philadelphia Story (1940) - Edward
- Hudson's Bay (1941) - Groom of the Chamber (uncredited)
- Scotland Yard (1941) - Hugh Burnside
- Charley's Aunt (1941) - Hilary Babberly
- Dr. Jekyll and Mr. Hyde (1941) - Mr. Marley (uncredited)
- How Green Was My Valley (1941) - Evans
- Almost Married (1942) - Mr. Marvin (final film role)
