= A Woman's Man =

1934 film directed by Edward Ludwig

- Directed by: Edward Ludwig
- Written by: Frances Hyland; Adela Rogers St. Johns
- Produced by: William T. Lackey
- Starring: John Halliday; Marguerite De La Motte; Wallace Ford
- Cinematography: Joseph A. Valentine
- Edited by: Carl Pierson
- Production company: Monogram Pictures
- Distributed by: Monogram Pictures
- Release date: February 7, 1934
- Running time: 70 minutes
- Country: United States
- Language: English

A Woman's Man is a 1934 American pre-Code comedy film directed by Edward Ludwig and starring John Halliday, Marguerite De La Motte and Wallace Ford.

== Plot ==
A film star diva storms off the film set and begins a romance with a publicity-hungry boxer.

== Cast ==
- John Halliday as Tom Cleary - Director
- Marguerite De La Motte as Gloria Jordan - Star
- Wallace Ford as Joe Flynn - Prizefighter
- Kitty Kelly as Molly Evans - Secretary
- Jameson Thomas as Roger Pentley - Playboy
- Tom Dugan as Pete Miller - Trainer
- Wallis Clark as Ralph Mallon- Studio Chief
- Donald Douglas as Walter Payson - Horseback Rider
- Leigh Allen as Crane - Leading Man
- George Mayo as Assistant Director
- Harrison Greene as Fight Announcer
- Jack Perry as Joe Ferrera
- Billie Van Every as Blonde

== Bibliography ==
- Langman, Larry. Destination Hollywood: The Influence of Europeans on American Filmmaking. McFarland, 2000.
