= John Halliday (actor) =

American actor (1880–1947)

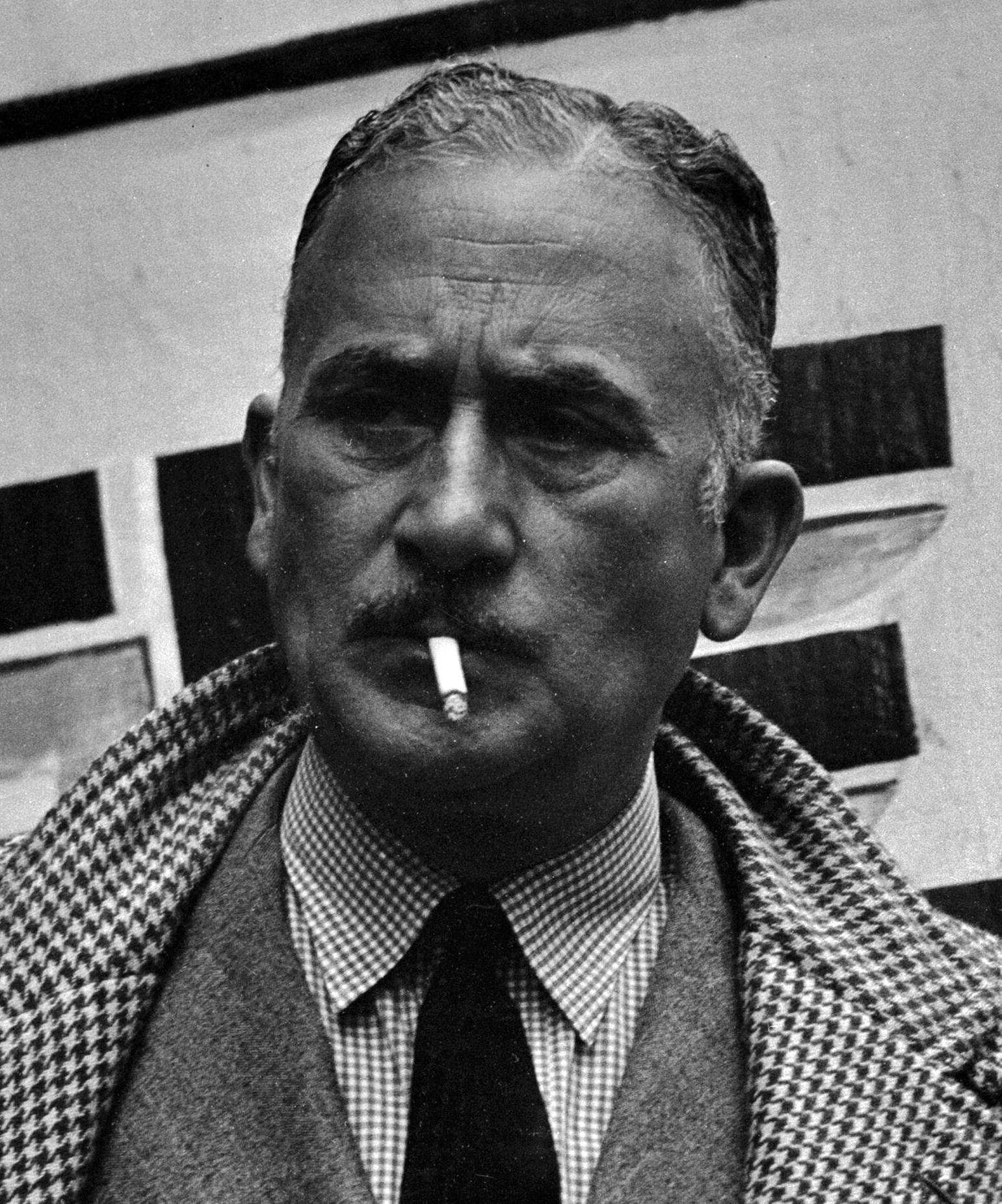
- Halliday in 1935
- Born: September 14, 1880; Brooklyn, New York, U.S.
- Died: October 17, 1947 (aged 67); Honolulu, Hawaii, U.S. Territory
- Other name: Jack Halliday
- Occupation: Actor
- Years active: 1912–1941
- Spouse(s): Camille Personi (?–?) (divorced); Eva Lang (1918–1928) (divorced); Eleanor Griffith (1929–1947) (his death)
- Children: 1

John Halliday (September 14, 1880 – October 17, 1947) was an American actor of stage and screen, who often played suave aristocrats and foreigners.

== Biography ==
Halliday was born in Brooklyn, New York. In infancy, he moved with his parents to Europe, and he lived abroad until he was 18.

He served with the British Army 1901–02 in the Boer War in South Africa. In 1905 Halliday, a civil/mining engineer from before his South Africa adventure, migrated to Nevada and dug up a fortune in gold nuggets and managed to lose the lot.

After losing his money in the stock market in Sacramento, Halliday became an actor with a stock theater company headed by Nat Goodwin. He progressed from that group to touring the world as leading man in a troupe headed by T. Daniel Frawley.

Making his Broadway debut in 1912 in Cecil Raleigh and Henry Hamilton's The Whip, he became a familiar presence there, especially in sophisticated comedies such as W. Somerset Maugham's The Circle (1921), Vincent Lawrence's Sour Grapes (1926), Louis Verneuil's Jealousy (1928) and S. N. Behrman's Rain from Heaven (1934).

He was also well known for his film roles. He was one of the leading actors in the drama film Millie. His best-known movie appearance was as "Seth Lord", father of Tracy Lord (Katharine Hepburn) in the film adaptation of Philip Barry's The Philadelphia Story (1940). The following year he played his final role in Lydia (1941).

== Personal life ==
In 1912, Halliday's wife, Camille Personi, sued May Buckley for alienation of affections. "'May Buckley has broken up my home and ruined my life,' Mrs. Halliday said, 'and I am determined that she shall suffer.'"

His second wife was actress Eva Lang; they married in 1917, and divorced in 1928. In 1929, Halliday married actress Eleanor Griffith in Greenwich, Connecticut.

He died from a heart ailment at the age of 67 on October 17, 1947, in Honolulu, Hawaii.

== Partial filmography ==
- The Devil's Toy (1916) – Paul La France
- The Woman Gives (1920) – Daniel Garford
- The Blue Pearl (1920) – Richard Drake
- The Love Expert (1920) – Jim Winthrop
- Masked Lover (1928)
- East Side Sadie (1929)
- Recaptured Love (1930) – Brentwood Parr
- Scarlet Pages (1930) – John Remington
- Once a Sinner (1931) – Richard Kent
- Captain Applejack (1931) – Ambrose Applejohn
- Millie (1931) – Jimmy Damier
- 50 Million Frenchmen (1931) – Michael Cummins
- Father's Son (1931) – Dr. Franklin
- The Spy (1931) – Sergei Krasnoff
- Transatlantic (1931) – Henry D. Graham
- Smart Woman (1931) – Sir Guy Harrington
- Consolation Marriage (1931) – Jeff Hunter
- The Ruling Voice (1931) – Dexter Burroughs
- Men of Chance (1931) – Dorval
- The Impatient Maiden (1932) – Albert Hartman
- Week Ends Only (1932) – Arthur Ladden
- The Man Called Back (1932) – Gordon St. Claire
- Bird of Paradise (1932) – Mac
- The Age of Consent (1932) – Prof. David Mathews
- Perfect Understanding (1933) – Ivan Ronnson
- The Woman Accused (1933) – Stephen Bessemer
- Terror Aboard (1933) – Maximilian Kreig
- Bed of Roses (1933) – Stephen Paige
- The House on 56th Street (1933) – Lyndon Fiske
- A Woman's Man (1934) – Tom Cleary – Director
- Registered Nurse (1934) – Dr. Hedwig
- The Witching Hour (1934) – Jack Brookfield
- Finishing School (1934) – Mr. Frank S. Radcliff
- Return of the Terror (1934) – Dr. John Redmayne
- Housewife (1934) – Paul
- Desirable (1934) – Austin
- Happiness Ahead (1934) – Henry Bradford
- Mystery Woman (1935) – Dr. Theodore Van Wyke
- The Dark Angel (1935) – Sir George Barton
- Peter Ibbetson (1935) – The Duke of Towers
- The Melody Lingers On (1935) – Marco Turina
- Desire (1936) – Carlos Margoli
- Fatal Lady (1936) – Martan Fontes
- Three Cheers for Love (1936) – Charles Dormant
- Hollywood Boulevard (1936) – John Wellington Blakeford
- Arsène Lupin Returns (1938) – Count de Grissac
- Blockade (1938) – Andre Gallinet
- That Certain Age (1938) – Gilbert Fullerton
- Hotel for Women (1939) – John Craig
- Intermezzo (1939) – Thomas Stenborg
- Escape to Glory (1940) – John Morgan
- The Philadelphia Story (1940) – Seth Lord
- Lydia (1941) – Fitzpatrick (final film role)
