= White Legion (film) =

1936 American drama film

- Theatrical release poster
- Directed by: Karl Brown
- Screenplay by: Karl Brown
- Produced by: B. F. Zeidman
- Starring: Ian Keith; Tala Birell; Ferdinand Gottschalk; Suzanne Kaaren; Lionel Pape; Rollo Lloyd; Teru Shimada; Nigel De Brulier
- Cinematography: Harry Jackson
- Edited by: W. Duncan Mansfield
- Music by: Hugo Riesenfeld
- Production company: B. F. Ziedman Film
- Distributed by: Grand National Films Inc.
- Release date: October 25, 1936
- Running time: 81 minutes
- Country: United States
- Language: English

White Legion is a 1936 American drama film written and directed by Karl Brown. The film stars Ian Keith, Tala Birell, Ferdinand Gottschalk, Suzanne Kaaren, Lionel Pape, Rollo Lloyd, Teru Shimada and Nigel De Brulier. The film was released on October 25, 1936, by Grand National Films Inc.

== Plot ==
In the early 1900s, as the Panama Canal is being built, a group of doctors try to discover a cure for yellow fever, a disease that is decimating the workers constructing canal.

== Cast ==
- Ian Keith as Dr. Julian Murray
- Tala Birell as Dr. Sterne
- Ferdinand Gottschalk as Dr. Fontaine
- Suzanne Kaaren as Gloria Blank
- Lionel Pape as Dr. Travis
- Rollo Lloyd as The Colonel
- Teru Shimada as Dr. Nogi
- Nigel De Brulier as Father Gonzales
- Nina Campana as Maria
- Warner Richmond as Burke
- Ferdinand Munier as Sen. Blank
- Harry Allen as McKenzie
- Don Barclay as Miggs
- Snub Pollard as Baker
- Robert Warwick as Capt. Parker
