= The Doctor's Secret (1929 film) =

1929 film

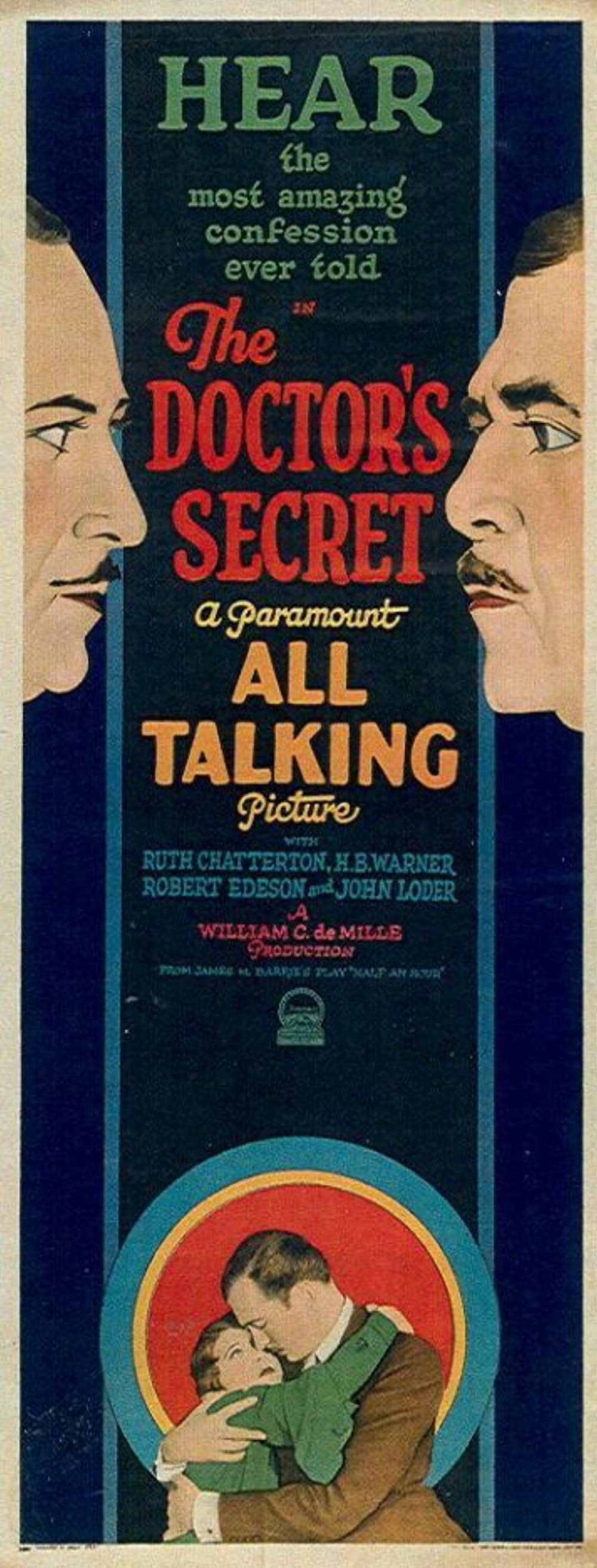
- Poster
- Directed by: William C. deMille
- Screenplay by: William C. deMille
- Based on: Half an Hour by J. M. Barrie
- Produced by: Jesse L. Lasky; Adolph Zukor
- Starring: Ruth Chatterton; H. B. Warner; John Loder; Robert Edeson; Wilfred Noy; Ethel Wales
- Cinematography: J. Roy Hunt
- Edited by: Merrill G. White
- Music by: Seymour Burns
- Production company: Paramount Pictures
- Distributed by: Paramount Pictures
- Release date: January 26, 1929
- Running time: 61 minutes
- Country: United States
- Language: English

The Doctor's Secret is a 1929 American drama film directed by William C. deMille and written by William C. deMille. The film stars Ruth Chatterton, H. B. Warner, John Loder, Robert Edeson, Wilfred Noy, and Ethel Wales. It is based on the 1913 play Half an Hour by J. M. Barrie. The film was released on January 26, 1929, by Paramount Pictures. As part of the policy of multiple-language versions during the early sound era, a separate Swedish version was produced at the Joinville Studios in Paris and released the following year.

== Plot ==
Young Englishwoman Lillian Garson is unhappy with her marriage and decides to elope with another man. However he is killed in a car accident and she returns home to her husband and tries to carry on as if nothing had happened. Only the doctor who shows up at their house for dinner that night, and who dealt with the crash, knows the truth.

== Cast ==
- Ruth Chatterton as Lillian Garson
- H. B. Warner as Richard Garson
- John Loder as Hugh Paton
- Robert Edeson as Dr. Brodie
- Wilfred Noy as Mr. Redding
- Ethel Wales as Mrs. Redding
- Nanci Price as Susie
- Frank Finch Smiles as Wethers

== Preservation ==
The Doctor's Secret is a lost film.

== See also ==
- List of early sound feature films (1926–1929)

== Bibliography ==
- Crafton, Donald. The Talkies: American Cinema's Transition to Sound, 1926-1931. University of California Press, 1999.
