= Michi Kobi =

American actress

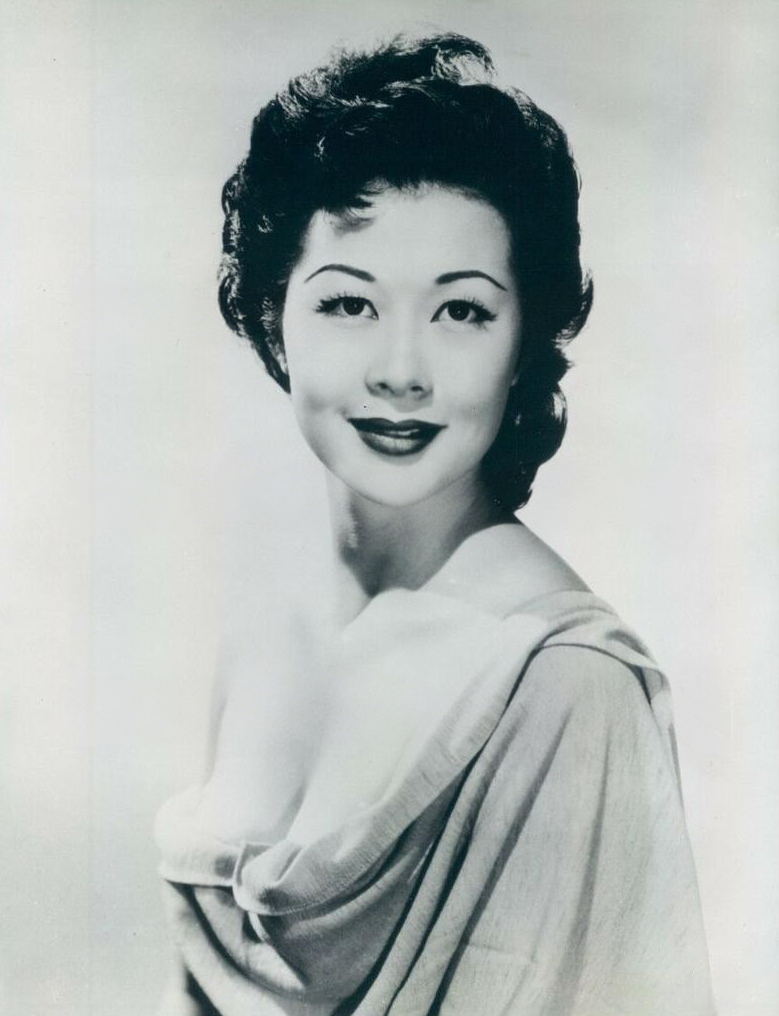
- Kobi c. 1959
- Born: Machiko Kobinata Okamoto; November 2, 1924; Sacramento, California
- Died: March 1, 2016 (aged 91); Manhattan, New York City, New York
- Education: New York University
- Occupations: Actor; model; secretary; translator

Michi Kobi (2 November 1924 – 1 March 2016), born Machiko Kobinata Okamoto, was an American actress.

== Life ==
Kobi was born 2 November 1924 in Sacramento, California as Machiko Kobinata Okamoto. Her father, Rikikazu Okamoto, came to America at age 17 in 1902 and became a doctor. In 1923 her father went to Japan, married Ito Kobinata, and brought her to Sacramento. During World War II, following the signing of Executive Order 9066, Kobi and her mother were sent to Tanforan Assembly Center and then Topaz War Relocation Center.

After the war she went to New York City, seeking to become an actor, and lived there the rest of her life. She studied acting at New York University. In addition to acting on stage, screen, and television, she worked as a model, secretary, and translator. As a translator she worked for the Japan External Trade Organization (JETRO). She was very outspoken about the sanitized depictions of the conditions in the World War II internment camps and also campaigned for an apology and reparations. She left acting due to the few quality roles for Asian women. She died in Manhattan, New York City on 1 March 2016.

== Filmography ==
- 1954: The New Adventures of China Smith (TV)
- 1959: Tokyo After Dark playing Sumi Fukita
- 1960: 12 to the Moon playing Dr. Hideko Murata
- 1960: Hell to Eternity playing Sono
- 1961: Cry for Happy playing Hanakichi
- 1991: American Rickshaw playing Old Madame Luna
- 2004: Law & Order (TV) episode "Gaijin", playing Mrs. Ito

== Theater ==
- 1963–1964: original Broadway production of "One Flew Over the Cuckoo's Nest" playing 'Nurse Nakamura'

== See also ==
- Hiroaki Sato, who knew Kobi for 30 years and wrote an article upon her death
