= Female (novel) =

1933 novel by Donald Henderson Clarke

- Author: Donald Henderson Clarke
- Language: English
- Publisher: Vanguard Press
- Publication date: 1933
- Publication place: United States
- Media type: Hardcover, paperback
- Pages: 310

Female is a 1933 novel by Donald Henderson Clarke. It was translated into Czech as Samička : Román ženy (1934).

The novel was used as the basis of the feature film Female, produced the same year by Warner Bros. and directed by Michael Curtiz.

== Plot ==
The story is about the rise of determined, emotionally hardened Margy Kane (daughter of a fencer and a parlor maid) from the back alleys of New England to her married life on Park Avenue.

== Reception ==
The book was declared obscene by the Brooklyn Appellate Division of the New York Supreme Court in 1935.
