= Journal of a Crime =

1934 film by William Keighley

- Poster
- Directed by: William Keighley
- Based on: Une vie perdue 1933 play by Jacques Deval
- Produced by: Hal B. Wallis
- Starring: Ruth Chatterton; Adolphe Menjou; Claire Dodd
- Cinematography: Ernest Haller
- Edited by: William Clemens; James Gibbon
- Music by: Leo F. Forbstein
- Production company: First National Pictures
- Distributed by: Warner Bros. Pictures
- Release date: March 1934
- Running time: 64-65 minutes
- Country: United States
- Language: English

Journal of a Crime is a 1934 American pre-Code crime drama film produced by First National Pictures. It was directed by William Keighley and stars Ruth Chatterton, Adolphe Menjou and Claire Dodd. The film is a remake of the 1933 French film Une vie perdue, written by Jacques Deval.

== Plot ==
Francoise is a jealous wife who spies on her playwright husband Paul one evening after a play and overhears Paul and his lover Odette, the star of the show, quarreling. Odette demands that Paul leave Francoise, but he does not want to hurt his wife. Paul returns home at 3 a.m. and finds Francoise waiting for him. She pretends that she knows nothing of the affair and then attempts to seduce him but fails.

Francoise consults a lawyer to prevent Paul from divorcing her, but she learns that she cannot legally compel Paul to remain in the marriage. That night at the theater, Paul tries to tell Odette why he was not able to tell Francoise that he is leaving her but promises to do so later that night. Later during the rehearsal, a shot is heard and Odette falls to the floor dead. The police are summoned and arrest Costelli, a man who killed a bank teller just before hiding in the theater. However, he denies any involvement in Odette's murder.

Paul finds his own gun in a bucket and immediately knows that Francoise committed the murder. Later that evening, he confronts her and calls her a fiend. He first threatens to report her to the police but then resolves to stay with her and watch her crumble under the weight of her guilt.

As Paul had predicted, Francoise's guilty conscience begins to deeply trouble her. When she learns that Costelli has been sentenced to death for the murder of Odette, she visits him in prison and confesses to him that she had murdered Odette. Costelli advises her to never again mention her complicity, as he would have been executed for killing the bank teller regardless of the murder of Odette.

Six months later, Paul convinces Francoise to surrender to the authorities and promises to support her. While walking to the attorney general's office, she runs into the street to save a boy from an oncoming truck but is hit by the truck and sustains a serious head injury. The doctor tells Paul that although Francoise will live, she has suffered total amnesia and will need to be reeducated as if she were a child. Francoise's amnesia means that she will not recall the murder or her guilt, so Paul takes her to the south of France to help her recuperate, convinced that it is God's plan.

== Cast ==
- Ruth Chatterton as Francoise
- Adolphe Menjou as Paul
- Claire Dodd as Odette
- George Barbier as Chautard
- Douglas Dumbrille as Cartier
- Noel Madison as Costelli
- Henry O'Neill as Doctor
- Phillip Reed as Man at Party
- Henry Kolker as Henri Marcher
- Walter Pidgeon as Florestan
- Clay Clement as The Police Inspector

== Reviews ==
- Movie review: Journal of a Crime (1934) Murder Backstage. by B.R.C. New York Times Published: April 28, 1934

== Additional sources ==
- The American Film Institute Catalog of Motion Pictures Feature Films, 1931–1940
- Zsófia Anna Tóth. "The Merry Murderers": The Farcical (Re)Figuration of the Femme Fatale in Maurine Dallas Watkins' Chicago (1927) and its various adaptations. Ph.D. dissertation, University of Szeged, 2010.
