= Female (1933 film) =

1933 film

- Theatrical release poster
- Directed by: Michael Curtiz; William Dieterle (uncredited); William A. Wellman (uncredited, 17 scenes)
- Written by: Gene Markey; Kathryn Scola
- Based on: Female; 1933 novel by Donald Henderson Clarke
- Produced by: Robert Presnell Sr.
- Starring: Ruth Chatterton; George Brent
- Cinematography: Sidney Hickox
- Edited by: Jack Killifer
- Music by: Sammy Fain (uncredited)
- Production company: Warner Bros. Pictures
- Distributed by: Warner Bros. Pictures
- Release date: November 11, 1933
- Running time: 60 minutes
- Country: United States
- Language: English

Female is a 1933 American pre-Code romantic drama film directed by Michael Curtiz and starring Ruth Chatterton and George Brent. It is based on the 1933 novel of the same name by Donald Henderson Clarke.

== Plot ==
Alison Drake is the wealthy owner and hard-driving, no-nonsense head of a large automobile company, inherited from her father. Her work has caused her to lose her youthful romanticism, and she has casual affairs with men, including her own employees.

Alison hosts a party at her mansion, but becomes fed up with the men out to either sell her things or marry her for her money. She dresses down and goes to an amusement park, where she picks up a man at a shooting gallery. They have fun together, but he refuses her offer to go home with her.

The next day, they meet again at her factory. To their mutual astonishment, he turns out to be Jim Thorne, a gifted engineer she has ordered her underlings to hire away from her competition. Saying that she has no time now, Alison has him come to her mansion that night, supposedly to discuss his plans for the company in detail. She attempts to seduce him, but he rejects her as anything other than his employer.

Annoyed, she turns to her assistant, Pettigew, for advice. He tells her that men want women who are softer and less independent, so she adjusts her tactics. She tricks Jim into a picnic and wears him down. In the end, he succumbs to her charms.

The next day, he shows up at her office with a marriage license, but she informs him that she likes their relationship just the way it is. Outraged, he quits.

Alison has another problem on her hands. Her company needs more financing to survive, but another firm is intent on taking advantage of the situation to take over and has gotten the local banks to turn her down. She sets up an appointment to meet with bankers in New York City, but then breaks down when she realizes that she cannot live without Jim.

She has the police track down which way he went and drives off after him. She eventually finds him (at another shooting gallery) and tells him that she is willing to get married. Then, he realizes that they can fly to New York in time to save her company. Even so, she tells him that he will run the firm, while she desires to have nine children.

== Cast ==
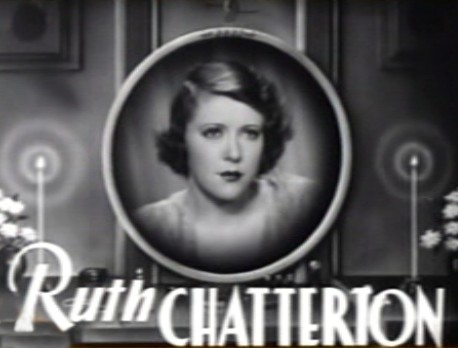
Ruth Chatterton in the trailer for Female

- Ruth Chatterton as Alison Drake
- George Brent as Jim Thorne
- Lois Wilson as Harriet Brown, a school friend of Drake
- Johnny Mack Brown as George Cooper, an employee Drake invites to her mansion
- Ruth Donnelly as Miss Frothingham, Drake's new secretary, after she decides that male ones are too distracting
- Ferdinand Gottschalk as Pettigrew, Drake's office manager
- Phillip Reed as Claybourne
- Kenneth Thomson as Red
- Douglass Dumbrille as Mumford, one of Drake's car dealers, who proposes a sort of business merger
- Spencer Charters as Tom
- Robert Greig as James, Drake's butler (uncredited)
- Rafaela Ottiano as Della, Alison's Maid (uncredited)

== Production ==
Three directors worked on this film. William Dieterle began it, and William Wellman took over to complete it when Dieterle became ill. When Warner's production head, Jack L. Warner, decided he did not like an actor in the film, Wellman was not available because he had started shooting College Coach, so Michael Curtiz was brought in to re-shoot with Johnny Mack Brown as the replacement. Curtiz ended up with the sole screen credit.

The film, which cost between $260,000 and $286,000 to make, and brought in $451,000 worldwide, was made at Warners' Burbank studios, with exterior shots of Chatterton's house filmed at Frank Lloyd Wright's Ennis House in the Hollywood Hills.

== Reception ==
Mordaunt Hall wrote that "although it possesses its reprehensible moments, it has the saving grace of having been produced with a sense of humor." He also approved of the performances of Chatterton, Brent and Gottschalk.

== See also ==
- National Recovery Administration (NRA), the logo displayed at start of film
