= Eva Lang (actress) =

American actress

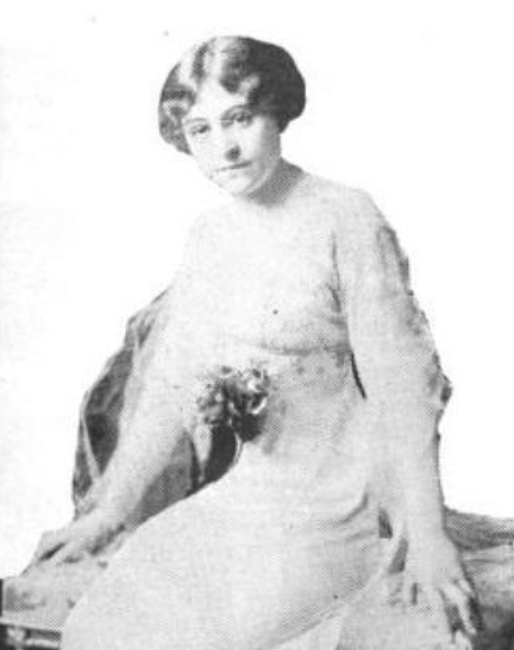
- Eva Lang, from a 1916 publication
- Born: Eva Clara Lang; September 11, 1884; Columbus, Ohio
- Died: April 7, 1933 (aged 48); Los Angeles, California
- Occupation: Actress
- Spouse: John Halliday

Eva Clara Lang (September 11, 1884 – April 7, 1933) was an American actress.

== Early life ==
Lang was born in Columbus, Ohio and raised in Kansas City, Missouri. Her mother, Minnie B. Lang, was a physician who practiced in Kansas City for twenty years. Her sister Marie Gertrude Pearce was also an actress, known professionally as "Marie Hudson".

== Career ==
Lang was a stage actress, and the leading lady of stock companies. In 1910, she was one of the first American actresses to play Peter Pan on stage. In 1917, The Dramatic Mirror reported that Lang was "the most popular stock actress Omaha has ever known." "In Kansas City during the 1900s," notes one theatre historian, "the young women would go home after the play to practice in front of a mirror the Eva Lang gestures and the Eva Lang walk." Her stage costumes were described in detail in magazines. She toured in Japan, China, India, and the Philippines in Daniel Frawley's repertoire company in 1917.

Lang appeared in several silent films, including A Desperate Tenderfoot (1920), A Western Feud (1921), The Golden Lure (1921), and The Outlaw's Revenge (1921), all directed by Otis B. Thayer. In 1930, after a brief retirement, she made a comeback appearance in Kansas City, in Her Friend, the King.

== Personal life ==
Lang was married to actor John Halliday from 1917 until they divorced in 1928. She died in 1933, aged 48 years, in Los Angeles, California.
