= The Sweet and the Bitter (1967 film) =

1967 Canadian film directed by James Clavell

- Directed by: James Clavell
- Written by: James Clavell
- Starring: Yoko Tani
- Production company: Panorama
- Release date: 1967
- Country: Canada
- Language: English

The Sweet and the Bitter, also known as Savage Justice, is a Canadian film directed by James Clavell. It was shot in 1962 but not released until 1967.

== Cast ==
- Yōko Tani as Mary Ota
- Paul Richards as Rob MacRoy
- Torin Thatcher as Duncan MacRoy
- Jane Mallett as Mrs. MacDonald
- Dale Ishimoto as Dick Kazanami
- Teru Shimada as Tom Hirata

== Production ==
In 1962 Clavell signed a two-picture deal with Panorama, a Canadian company, to produce and direct Circle of Greed in April and The Bitter and the Sweet in June. The former was not made. The film was the first production from a Canadian Company, Commonwealth, established by Oldřich Václavek, a Czech immigrant to Canada. The budget of CA $325,000 was raised from Canadian sources.

Filming started 4 June 1962 in Vancouver at Commonwealth's Hollyburn Studios (later known as Panorama Studios).

"I want to tell a story", said Clavell at the time. "If my story doesn't hold people, doesn't touch their emotions, then it is of no use. I go to the theatre and watch the reactions of the audience to my lines. They are quick to respond if a line is right. If they don't, I know something is wrong. King Rat is my first published novel and to write it I used what I had learned."

Clavell enjoyed Vancouver and bought a house there. It was there he wrote King Rat.

The film was a "production nightmare". The producers and the studio owners wound up in a five-year legal battle that resulted in RCA stripping $350,000 worth of sound equipment from the dubbing stage. The studio would be barely used over the next few years, making only The Trap (1966), The Clan of the Cave Bear (1986), The Hitchhiker (TV Series) (1985,1986) and The Littlest Hobo.

== Reception ==
The film was not released until 1967.
