= Tokyo After Dark =

1959 film

- Theatrical release poster
- Directed by: Norman T. Herman
- Written by: Norman T. Herman; Marvin Segal
- Produced by: Norman T. Herman; Marvin Segal
- Starring: Michi Kobi; Richard Long; Lawrence Dobkin; Paul Dubov; Teru Shimada; Bob Okazaki
- Cinematography: William Margulies
- Edited by: Robert Lawrence
- Music by: Alexander Courage
- Production company: Nacirema Productions
- Distributed by: Paramount Pictures
- Release date: February 1959
- Running time: 80 minutes
- Country: United States
- Language: English

Tokyo After Dark is a 1959 American drama film directed by Norman T. Herman, written by Norman T. Herman and Marvin Segal, and starring Michi Kobi, Richard Long, Lawrence Dobkin, Paul Dubov, Teru Shimada and Bob Okazaki. It was released in February 1959, by Paramount Pictures.

== Plot ==
A military policeman accidentally kills a Japanese teenager and attempts to escape Japanese authorities.

== Cast ==
- Michi Kobi as Sumi Fujita
- Richard Long as Sgt. Robert Douglas
- Lawrence Dobkin as Maj. Bradley
- Paul Dubov as Jesse Bronson
- Teru Shimada as Sen-Sei
- Bob Okazaki as Store Proprietor
- Carlyle Mitchell as Mr. Johnson
- Frank Kumagai as Nakamura
- John Brinkley as 2nd G.I.
- Edo Mita as Kojima
- Lowell Brown as 1st G.I.
- Don Keigo Takeuchi as Toshio
- Jerry Adler as Sgt. Williams
