= Ruth Chatterton =

American actress and novelist (1892–1961)

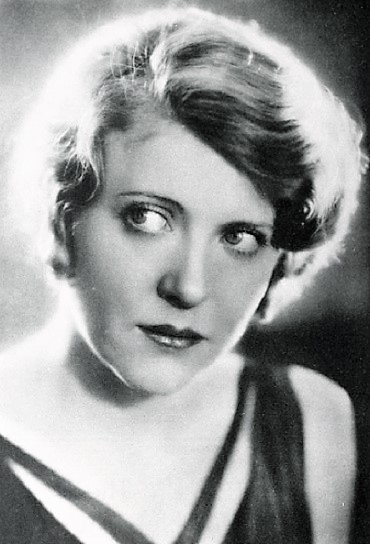
- Chatterton in 1930
- Born: December 24, 1892; New York City, U.S.
- Died: November 24, 1961 (aged 68); Norwalk, Connecticut, U.S.
- Resting place: Beechwoods Cemetery
- Occupations: Actress, novelist
- Years active: 1908–1953
- Spouses: Ralph Forbes (m. 1924; div. 1932) George Brent (m. 1932; div. 1934) Barry Thomson (m. 1942; died 1960)

Ruth Chatterton (December 24, 1892 – November 24, 1961) was an American stage, film, and television actress, aviator and novelist. She was at her most popular in the early to mid-1930s, and in the same era gained prominence as an aviator, one of the few female pilots in the United States at the time. In the late 1930s, Chatterton retired from film acting but continued her career on the stage. She had several TV roles beginning in the late 1940s and became a successful novelist in the 1950s.

== Early life ==
Chatterton was born in New York City on December 24, 1892 to Walter, an architect, and Lillian (née Reed) Chatterton. She was of English and French extraction. Her parents separated while she was young. Chatterton attended Mrs. Hagen's School in Pelham, New York.

In 1908, Chatterton and her friends were attending a play in Washington, D.C. Chatterton later criticized the acting of the lead actress to her friends, who challenged her to become a stage actress herself or "shut up". Chatterton accepted the challenge, and a few days later, joined the chorus of the stage show. She soon dropped out of school to pursue a stage career. Aged 16, Chatterton joined the Friend Stock Company in Milwaukee, Wisconsin, where she remained for six months.

== Career ==
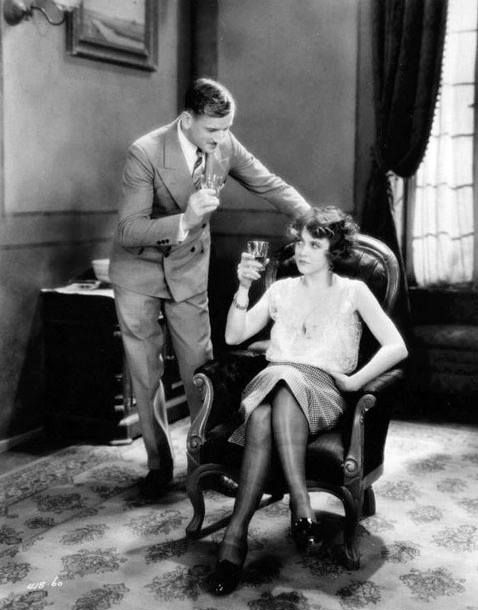
Ullrich Haupt and Chatterton in Madame X (1929)

In 1911, Chatterton made her Broadway stage debut in The Great Name. Her greatest success onstage came in 1914, when she starred in the play Daddy Long Legs, adapted from the novel by Jean Webster.

Chatterton married her first husband, actor Ralph Forbes, on December 19, 1924, in Manhattan. They moved to Los Angeles. With the help of Emil Jannings, she was cast in her first film role in Sins of the Fathers in 1928. That same year, she was signed to a contract by Paramount Pictures. Chatterton's first film for Paramount was also her first sound film, The Doctor's Secret, released in 1929. Chatterton was able to make the transition from silents to sound because of her stage experience.

Later in 1929, Chatterton was loaned to Metro-Goldwyn-Mayer, where she starred in Madame X. The film was a critical and box-office success, and effectively launched Chatterton's career. For her work in the film, Chatterton received her first nomination for an Academy Award for Best Actress. The following year, she starred in Sarah and Son, portraying an impoverished housewife who rises to fame and fortune as an opera singer. The film was another critical and financial success, and Chatterton received a second Academy Award nomination for Best Actress. Later that year, Chatterton was voted the second female star of the year, behind only Norma Shearer, in a poll conducted by the West Coast film exhibitors.

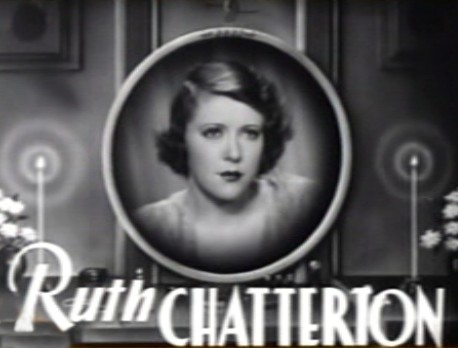
Chatterton in the trailer for Female (1933)

In 1933, Chatterton starred in the successful Pre-Code comedy-drama Female, in which she plays the head of an automobile factory who uses handsome men in her employ for sex and then drops them. When she left Paramount Pictures, her initial home studio, for Warner Bros., along with Kay Francis and William Powell, the brothers Warner were said to then need an infusion of "class". Chatterton's last picture for Warner Brothers was the 1934 drama Journal of a Crime, co-starring Adolphe Menjou and Claire Dodd. In this late pre-Coder, Chatterton plays a jealous wife who murders her husband's mistress. Chatterton is well-remembered for the types of roles that came to an end with implementation of the Production Code in July 1934, but she went on to co-star in the film Dodsworth (1936), for Samuel Goldwyn. This is widely regarded as her finest film, with what many considered an Oscar-worthy performance, although she was not nominated. Due to her age and the studios' focus on younger, more bankable stars, she moved to England and made only two more pictures, ending with A Royal Divorce (1938). She came back in 1948 to appear on television until 1953.

== Later years ==
By 1938, Chatterton had tired of motion picture acting and retired from films. She moved back to the Eastern United States, where she lived with her third husband, Barry Thomson. In 1940 she returned to the Broadway stage to star in John Van Druten's Leave Her to Heaven. She continued acting in Broadway productions and appeared in the London production of The Constant Wife, for which she received good reviews. Chatterton also raised French poodles and began a successful writing career. Her first novel, Homeward Borne, was published in 1950 and became a best seller. She went on to write three more novels: The Betrayers (1953), The Pride of the Peacock (1954), and The Southern Wild (1958).

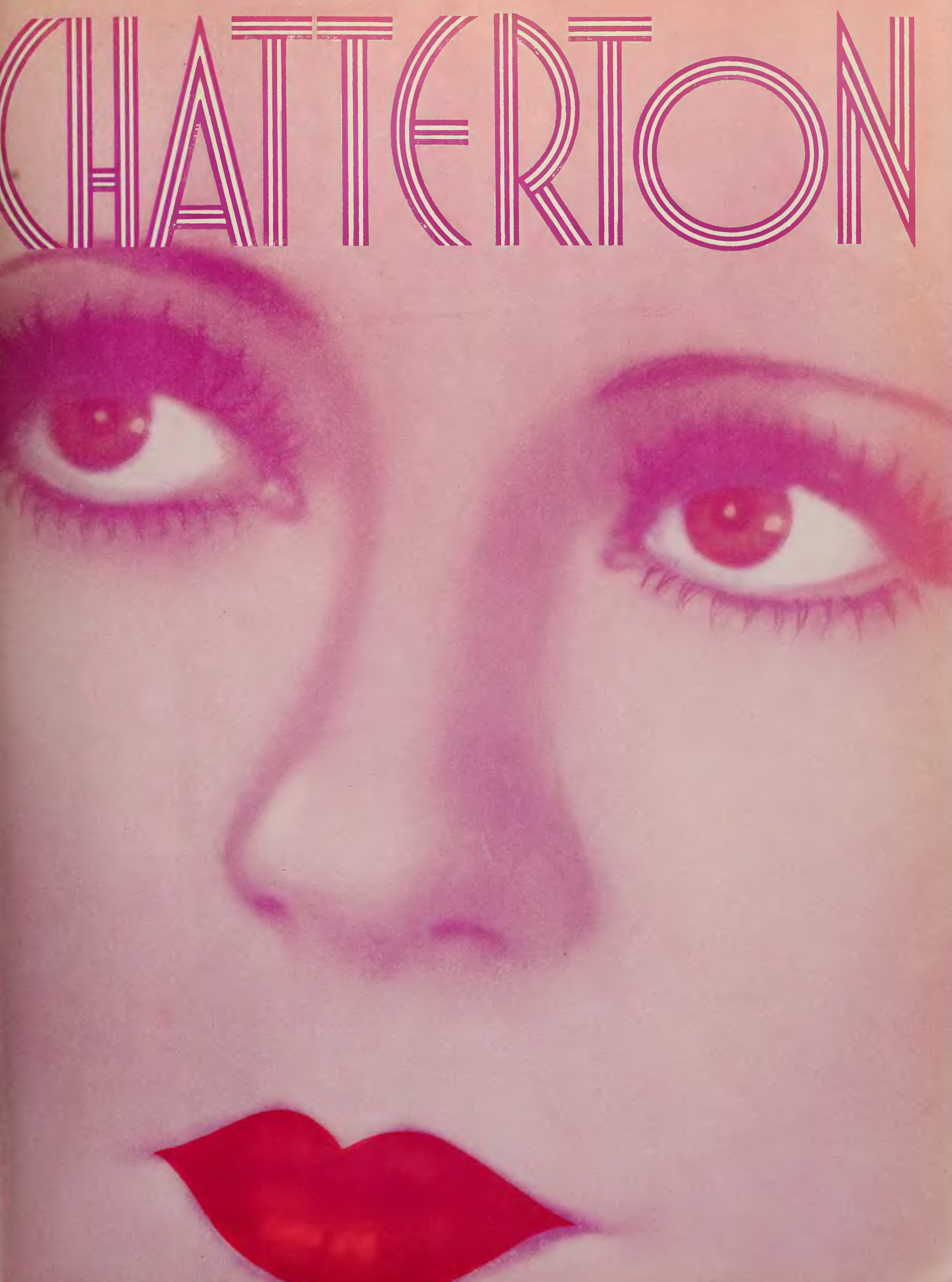
Ruth Chatterton ad from The Film Daily, 1932

In 1947 she narrated a four-sided 78 rpm disc set, The Revolt of the Alphabet, written by John Byrne, with music by Vladimir Selinsky.

Chatterton came out of retirement in the 1950s, and appeared on U.S. television in several plays, including a TV adaptation of Dodsworth on Prudential Playhouse, alongside Mary Astor and Walter Huston. Her last television appearance was as Gertrude in a 1953 adaptation of Hamlet, with Maurice Evans in the title role, on the anthology series Hallmark Hall of Fame.

== Personal life ==
=== Flying ===
Chatterton was one of the few woman aviators of her era, and was good friends with Amelia Earhart. She flew solo across the U.S. several times, and served as sponsor of the Sportsman Pilot Mixed Air Derby and the annual Ruth Chatterton Air Derby during the 1930s; she also opened the National Air Races in Los Angeles in 1936. She taught British film and stage actor Brian Aherne to fly, an experience he described at length in his 1969 autobiography A Proper Job.

=== Marriages ===
Chatterton was married three times and had no children. In 1924, she married British actor Ralph Forbes, who starred opposite her that same year in The Magnolia Lady, a musical version of the A.E. Thomas and Alice Duer Miller hit Come Out of the Kitchen. Their divorce was finalized on August 12, 1932. The following day, August 13, Chatterton married George Brent, her The Rich Are Always with Us and The Crash co-star, in Harrison, New York. The couple separated in March 1934 and were divorced in October 1934.

Chatterton married actor Barry Thomson in 1942. They remained married until his death in 1960.

== Death ==
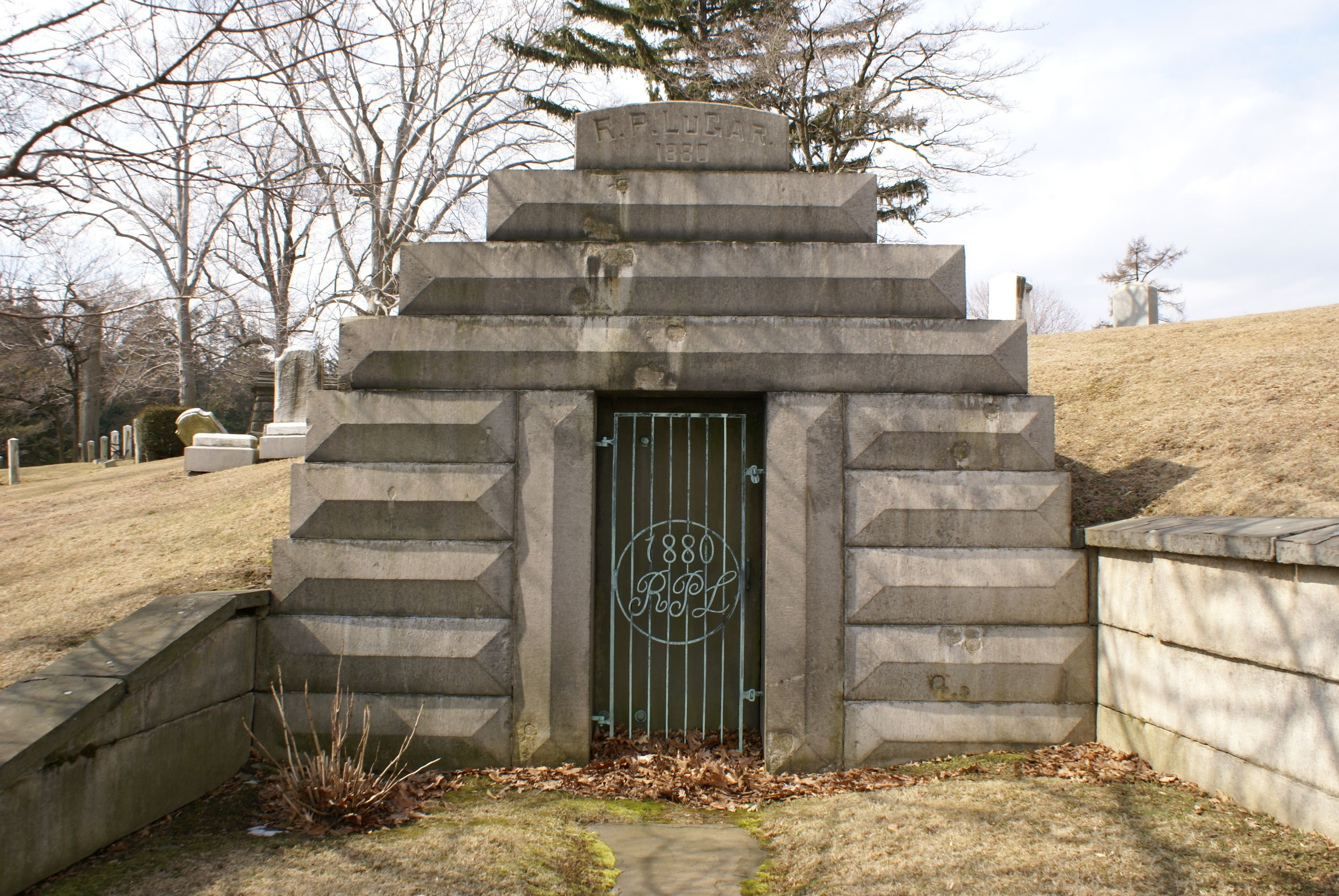
The Lugar Mausoleum where Chatterton's remains are interred

After the death of her third husband in 1960, Chatterton lived alone in the home they shared in Redding, Connecticut. On November 21, 1961, she suffered a cerebral hemorrhage while friends were visiting her home. She was taken to Norwalk Hospital in Norwalk, Connecticut, where she died on November 24, aged 68. She was cremated and is interred in a niche in the Lugar Mausoleum (Section 11, Lot 303) at Beechwoods Cemetery in New Rochelle, New York.

== Honors ==
For her contribution to the motion-picture industry, Ruth Chatterton has a star on the Hollywood Walk of Fame, at 6263 Hollywood Blvd. She is also a member of the American Theater Hall of Fame.

== Filmography ==
=== Film ===
Year	Title	Role	Notes
1928	Sins of the Fathers	Greta Blanke	Lost film
1929	The Doctor's Secret	Lillian Garson	Lost film
1929	The Dummy	Agnes Meredith	
1929	Madame X	Jacqueline	Alternative title: Absinthe; Nominated: Academy Award for Best Actress
1929	Charming Sinners	Kathryn Miles	
1929	The Laughing Lady	Marjorie Lee	
1930	Sarah and Son	Sarah Storm	Nominated: Academy Award for Best Actress
1930	Paramount on Parade	Floozie (The Montmartre Girl)	
1930	The Lady of Scandal	Elsie	
1930	Anybody's Woman	Pansy Gray	
1930	The Right to Love	Brooks Evans / Naomi Kellogg	
1931	Unfaithful	Lady Fay Kilkerry	
1931	The Magnificent Lie	Poll	
1931	Once a Lady	Anna Keremazoff	
1932	Tomorrow and Tomorrow	Eve Redman	
1932	The Rich Are Always with Us	Caroline Grannard	
1932	The Crash	Linda Gault	
1932	Frisco Jenny	Frisco Jenny Sandoval	
1933	Lilly Turner	Lilly "Queenie" Turner Dixon	
1933	Female	Alison Drake	
1934	Journal of a Crime	Francoise Moliet	
1936	Lady of Secrets	Celia Whittaker	
1936	Girls' Dormitory	Professor Anna Mathe	
1936	Dodsworth	Fran Dodsworth	
1937	The Rat	Zelia de Chaumont	
1938	A Royal Divorce	Josephine de Beauharnais	

=== Television ===
Year	Title	Role	Notes
1948	The Philco Television Playhouse		Episode: "Suspect"
1950	Prudential Family Playhouse	Fran Dodsworth	Episode: "Dodsworth"
1951	Celanese Theatre	Kit Marlowe	Episode: "Old Acquaintance"
1952	Pulitzer Prize Playhouse	Alison Stanhope	Episode: "Alison's House"
1952	Kraft Television Theatre		Episode: "Paper Moon"
1953	Hamlet	Gertrude	Television film, (final film role)

== See also ==
- List of actors with Academy Award nominations

== Works ==
- Homeward Borne: A Novel (1950)
- The Betrayers (1953)
- The Pride of the Peacock (1954)
- The Southern Wild (1958)
- Lady's Man (1961)
