= The Constant Wife (film) =

1962 film

- Directed by: Tom Pevsner
- Written by: Peter Goldbaum; Charles-Ferdinand Vaucher
- Based on: The Constant Wife by Somerset Maugham
- Produced by: Peter Goldbaum; Henrick Kaestlin
- Starring: Lilli Palmer; Peter van Eyck; Carlos Thompson
- Cinematography: Friedl Behn-Grund
- Edited by: Alice Ludwig
- Music by: Tibor Kasics
- Production companies: Cine Custodia Film; Peter Goldbaum Produktion
- Distributed by: Europa Filmverleih
- Release date: 30 March 1962
- Running time: 84 minutes
- Countries: Switzerland; West Germany
- Language: German

The Constant Wife (German: Finden Sie, daß Constanze sich richtig verhält?) is a 1962 Swiss-West German comedy film directed by Tom Pevsner and starring Lilli Palmer, Peter van Eyck and Carlos Thompson. It is an adaptation of the 1926 play of the same title by Somerset Maugham. It was shot at the Wandsbek Studios in Hamburg and on location in the apline resort of St. Moritz. The film's sets were designed by the art directors Albrecht Becker and Herbert Kirchhoff.

== Synopsis ==
Doctor Calonder has a successful medical practice in a ski resort, but his wife Constanze is irritated by the attention he pays to the wealthy female visitors to the resort as well as to her friend Marie-Louise. In order to make him jealous she decides to arrange a rendezvous with the poet Bernard Somerset.

== Cast ==
- Lilli Palmer as Constanze Calonder
- Peter van Eyck as Dr. Fred Calonder
- Carlos Thompson as Bernard Somerset
- Dorian Gray as Marie-Louise Jörgensen
- Max Lichtegg as Sven Jörgensen
- Agnes Windeck as Frau Professor Dietz
- Elvira Schalcher as Martha Dietz
- Vittorio Bertolini as Antonio Baffi
- Eva Langraf as Barbara

== Bibliography ==
- Frischknecht, Jürg, Kramer, Thomas & Schweizer, Werner. Filmlandschaft: Engadin, Bergell, Puschlav, Münstertal. Verlag Bündner Monatsblatt, 2003.
- Goble, Alan. The Complete Index to Literary Sources in Film. Walter de Gruyter, 1999.
