= Battle of the Coral Sea (film) =

1959 film

- Original film poster
- Directed by: Paul Wendkos
- Written by: Stephen Kandel; Daniel B. Ullman
- Produced by: Charles H. Schneer
- Starring: Cliff Robertson; Gia Scala; Patricia Cutts
- Cinematography: Wilfred M. Cline
- Edited by: Chester W. Schaeffer
- Music by: Ernest Gold
- Production company: Morningside Productions
- Distributed by: Columbia Pictures
- Release date: November 1959
- Running time: 86 minutes
- Country: United States
- Language: English

Battle of the Coral Sea is a 1959 American war film directed by Paul Wendkos and starring Cliff Robertson, Gia Scala and Patricia Cutts. It was distributed by Columbia Pictures.

== Plot ==
The crew of an American submarine are on a reconnaissance mission, photographing Japanese installations through a periscope camera. When attacked by the Japanese (with similarities to USS Perch) the submarine is scuttled and the crew is captured. Tortured by the Japanese, with the help of British and Australian prisoners the submarine's officers make an escape bid to get their information to the Allies. The film ends with footage of the Battle of the Coral Sea (1942), which according to the film was made possible through the information brought back by the submariners.

== Cast ==
- Cliff Robertson as Lieutenant Commander Jeff Conway
- Gia Scala as Karen Philips
- Teru Shimada as Commander Mori
- Patricia Cutts as Lieutenant Peg Whitcomb
- Gene Blakely as Lieutenant Len Ross
- L. Q. Jones as Yeoman Halliday
- Robin Hughes as Major Jammy Harris
- Tom Laughlin as Ensign Franklin
- George Takei as Japanese Radio Operator (uncredited)

== Filming locations ==
Filming started March 1959. Location filming was done on Santa Catalina Island and the Channel Islands off the coast of California.
