= Tom Pevsner =

British film producer and assistant director (1926–2014)

- Born: Thomas Pevsner; 2 October 1926; Dresden, German Reich
- Died: 18 August 2014 (aged 87); Fife, Scotland
- Education: University of Cambridge
- Occupations: Assistant film director and producer
- Years active: 1953–95
- Parents: Sir Nikolaus Pevsner (father); Lola Pevsner (mother)

Thomas Pevsner (2 October 1926 – 18 August 2014) was a British assistant film director and producer whose career spanned more than four decades.

He was the second of three children born to Sir Nikolaus Pevsner, an architectural historian of Russian Jewish origin. The family emigrated from Germany in 1933 to escape the Nazi regime.

Pevsner served in the British Army from 1944 to 1948 before studying modern languages at Trinity College, Cambridge. At Cambridge he edited The Cambridge Review, and was a member of the St John's College Film Society and the undergraduate committee of the Cambridge Film Society, where he served alongside Otto Plaschkes and Michael Birkett. After graduating he went to work at the Film Finance Corporation.

Tom Pevsner's notable credits include assistant director on The Ladykillers (1955) The Longest Day (1962) and The Private Life of Sherlock Holmes (1970) and as producer for Dracula (1979). He worked as associate, then executive producer on every James Bond film from For Your Eyes Only to GoldenEye. His contribution to the Bond series is acknowledged in the later Bond film Spectre, when Q states that he is staying at a hotel named Pevsner. In 1962 he directed the West German film The Constant Wife.

He died in 2014 aged 87. He was included in the In Memoriam tribute during the broadcast of the 87th Academy Awards on 22 February 2015.
