= Frank Shellenback =

American baseball player (1898–1969)

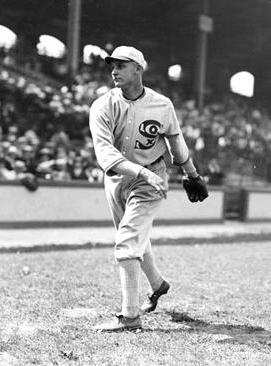
- Pitcher
- Born: December 16, 1898; Joplin, Missouri, U.S.
- Died: August 17, 1969 (aged 70); Newton, Massachusetts, U.S.
- Batted: Right Threw: Right

MLB debut
- May 8, 1918, for the Chicago White Sox

Last MLB appearance
- July 5, 1919, for the Chicago White Sox

MLB statistics
- Win–loss record: 10–15
- Earned run average: 3.06
- Strikeouts: 57
- Stats at Baseball Reference

Teams
- Chicago White Sox (1918–1919)

Frank Victor Shellenback (December 16, 1898 – August 17, 1969) was an American pitcher, pitching coach, and scout in Major League Baseball. As a pitcher, he was famous as an expert spitballer when the pitch was still legal in organized baseball; however, because Shellenback, then 21, was on a minor league roster when "trick pitches" was outlawed after the 1919 season, he was banned from throwing the pitch in the major leagues.

As a result, Shellenback spent 19 years (1920–38) — the remainder of his active career — throwing the spitball legally in the Pacific Coast League. He won a record 296 PCL games and was elected to the Pacific Coast League Hall of Fame in 1943.

Shellenback was a born in Joplin, Missouri, the son of a machinist. When he was 11 years old, his family moved to Los Angeles, where he graduated from Hollywood High School.

== Playing career ==
Shellenback threw and batted right-handed and stood 6 ft 2 in (1.88 m) tall and weighed 200 pounds (91 kg). After attending the University of Santa Clara, he became a professional baseball player during World War I and was acquired by the Chicago White Sox at age 19 during the 1918 season. In 36 American League games during 1918–19, Shellenback won ten games and lost 15, with an earned run average of 3.06 in 2172/3 innings pitched.

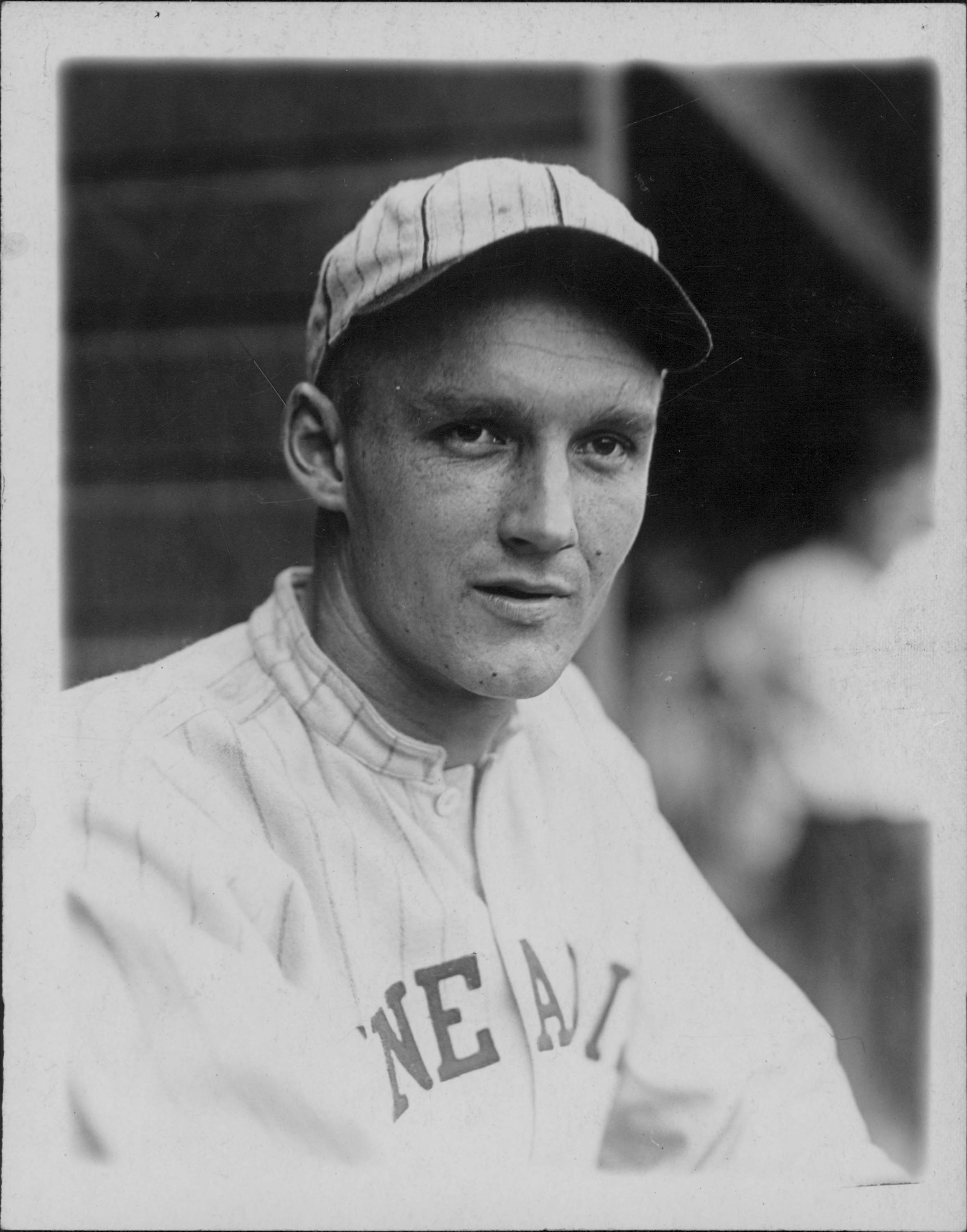
Shellenback with the Minneapolis Millers

He appeared in his last MLB game on July 5, 1919, before his contract was transferred to the Minneapolis Millers of the American Association. Although Shellenback posted a 7–3 record there, because of his minor league status, he was not included on a list of "grandfathered" spitball hurlers who would be allowed to continue to use the pitch at the major-league level. He would never again pitch in the majors, but was permitted to continue his career legally in minor league baseball.

Minneapolis sent Shellenback to the Vernon Tigers of the Pacific Coast League at the close of the 1919 campaign, and Shellenback began his long career in the circuit. He would hurl for Vernon, the Sacramento Solons, Hollywood Stars, and San Diego Padres, and win more than 20 games five times, with two 18-game and three 19-game winning seasons as well. All told, as a minor league pitcher, Shellenback won 315 games and lost 192 (for a winning percentage of .621), with an ERA of 3.55 over 4,5141/3 innings. Shellenback's long tenure with Los Angeles-based teams even led to a brief movie career; he had roles in the comedies Fireman, Save My Child (1932) and Alibi Ike (1935). Both films starred comedian and baseball enthusiast Joe E. Brown, whose son would become known as a successful baseball executive.

== Manager, coach and longtime scout ==
Shellenback had a long career as a manager, coach, and scout as well. In 1935, still an active pitcher, he took over the managerial reins of the Stars and moved with them to San Diego the following season. There, in 1936, he helped discover and groom one of the greatest hitters of all time, Ted Williams, who signed with the Padres as a 17-year-old pitcher-outfielder out of San Diego's Hoover High School. Williams was soon acquired by the Boston Red Sox, while Shellenback remained manager of the Padres through 1938, winning the 1937 PCL championship.

He then became a pitching coach for the St. Louis Browns (1939), Red Sox (1940–44), Detroit Tigers (1946–47), and New York Giants (1950–55), working on two pennant winners and one World Series champion with the Giants of Leo Durocher.

Shellenback overcame serious health setbacks (a heart attack in 1948 and an abdominal infection in 1951) to continue his coaching career. He became a Giants scout and roving minor league pitching instructor in 1956 and continued in that role until his death at age 70 in Newton, Massachusetts. Survivors included six children and 45 grandchildren.

Sporting positions
Preceded by Oscar Vitt	Hollywood Stars/San Diego Padres (PCL) manager 1935–1938	Succeeded by Cedric Durst
Preceded by Herb Pennock	Boston Red Sox pitching coach 1940–1944	Succeeded by Bill McKechnie (1952)
Preceded by Tom Sheehan	Minneapolis Millers manager 1948	Succeeded by Billy Herman
Preceded by Freddie Fitzsimmons	New York Giants pitching coach 1950–1955	Succeeded by Bucky Walters
