= The Phantom City =

1928 film directed by Albert S. Rogell

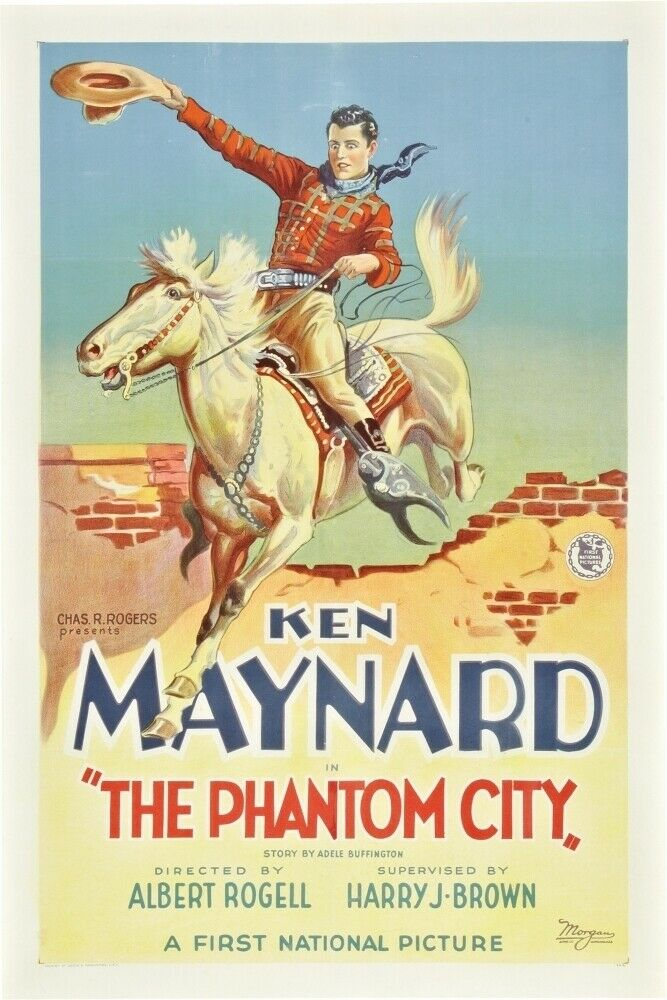
- Theatrical release poster
- Directed by: Albert S. Rogell
- Screenplay by: Adele Buffington; Fred Allen
- Produced by: Harry Joe Brown
- Starring: Ken Maynard; Eugenia Gilbert; James Mason; Charles Hill Mailes; Jack McDonald; Blue Washington
- Cinematography: Ted McCord
- Production company: Charles R. Rogers Productions
- Distributed by: First National Pictures; Warner Bros. Pictures
- Release date: December 23, 1928
- Running time: 65 minutes
- Country: United States
- Languages: Silent; English intertitles

The Phantom City is a 1928 American silent Western film directed by Albert S. Rogell and written by Adele Buffington and Fred Allen. The film stars Ken Maynard, Eugenia Gilbert, James Mason, Charles Hill Mailes, Jack McDonald and Blue Washington. The film was released on December 23, 1928, by First National Pictures.

== Plot ==
The film takes place in the American West, specifically a ghost town called “Gold City,”

Once a bustling mining camp, it's now a desolate ruin with a haunted reputation. The town is mostly uninhabited, except for the mysterious old-timers Benedict and Simon. But the past stirs to life when three strangers are summoned there under strange circumstances.

Sally Ann Drew and Joe Bridges are the legal owners of the abandoned Sally Ann Mine, thought to be worthless. The third newcomer is Tim Kelly, a rugged young adventurer who soon discovers that the mine holds more than memories.

Bridges, driven by greed, sends men to break into the mine—but they are stopped by an unseen force. Their horses return riderless, carrying grim warnings pinned to their saddles. Bridges suspects Benedict and Simon know more than they admit. Just as tensions mount, Tim arrives with his trusty sidekick Blue, and breaks up the conflict. At Benedict's cabin, Tim meets the spirited and brave Sally Ann, who is under Benedict's guardianship.

Tim learns he is the son of Jim Kelly, the original discoverer of the mine, who was believed dead for years—framed and imprisoned long ago. As he begins to piece together the truth, Tim is warned off by the eerie “phantom” figure haunting the mine.

To draw Bridges into the open, Tim sends Blue to a nearby town to withdraw $1,000, knowing Bridges will take the bait. Sure enough, Blue is held up and robbed. At a rickety saloon, Bridges and his gang celebrate—until Tim bursts in, revealing his identity and demanding justice. He forces Bridges to sign over his share of the mine as compensation for the stolen gold, letting him keep the thousand dollars as the “price.”

But as Tim tries to leave, he falls through a rotting floorboard and is captured. Bridges and his men break into the mine and unmask the mysterious phantom—none other than Jim Kelly, Tim's long-lost father. Jim had secretly extracted a fortune in gold, guarding it for his son's return.

Bridges plans a fast getaway with the gold. He locks Tim, Sally Ann, and Benedict inside, but Blue returns just in time to free them. Leaping onto his powerful horse Tarzan, Tim takes off in pursuit of Bridges, who flees in Sally Ann's stolen automobile.

In a pulse-pounding climax, Tim races across open fields, down slopes, and overtakes the speeding car. The two men grapple in a brutal fight on the running board. As the car skids off a bank, Tim leaps to safety—but Bridges is hurled into a deadly tumble.

With the gold recovered and justice served, the past is buried for good. Tim embraces Sally Ann, claiming both his rightful legacy—and his future.

== Cast ==
- Ken Maynard as Tim Kelly
- Eugenia Gilbert as Sally Ann Drew
- James Mason as Joe Bridges
- Charles Hill Mailes as Benedict
- Jack McDonald as Simon
- Blue Washington as 'Blue'
- Ben Corbett as Gang Member
- Tarzan as Tarzan the horse

== Production ==
Ken Maynard had earlier mixed the horror and western genres with his 1926 film The Haunted Ranch, and its success led to The Phantom City. Phantom City was regarded as one of Ken Maynard's best silent films, but in 1932 when the film was remade with sound as Haunted Gold (starring John Wayne), the silent version dropped out of circulation. Both versions featured African American actor Blue Washington doing his racially offensive "scared Negro" routine. The John Wayne remake used a much stock footage from the Ken Maynard version. Director Rogell later moved into directing television westerns such as Broken Arrow in the 1950s.
