= Alibi Ike =

1935 film by Ray Enright, Ring Lardner

- Lobby card
- Directed by: Ray Enright
- Screenplay by: William Wister Haines
- Based on: "Alibi Ike"; 1915 story in The Saturday Evening Post by Ring Lardner
- Produced by: Edward Chodorov
- Starring: Joe E. Brown; Olivia de Havilland; William Frawley
- Cinematography: Arthur L. Todd
- Edited by: Thomas Pratt
- Music by: Leo F. Forbstein
- Production company: Warner Bros. Pictures
- Distributed by: Warner Bros. Pictures
- Release date: June 15, 1935 (US)
- Running time: 72 minutes
- Country: United States
- Language: English

Alibi Ike is a 1935 American romantic comedy film directed by Ray Enright and starring Joe E. Brown, Olivia de Havilland and William Frawley. Based on the short story of the same name by Ring Lardner, first published in the Saturday Evening Post on July 31, 1915, the film is about an ace baseball player nicknamed "Alibi Ike" for his penchant for making up excuses. Lardner is said to have patterned the character after baseball player King Cole.

Alibi Ike was the most successful of Joe E. Brown's "baseball trilogy" of films, which also included Elmer, the Great and Fireman, Save My Child. It is considered one of the best baseball comedies of all time. Alibi Ike was the first feature film released starring Olivia de Havilland, although she made two previous films that were released later that year—The Irish in Us and the all-star Shakespeare epic A Midsummer Night's Dream, which also starred Joe E. Brown in a key role.

A print of the film is held by the Library of Congress.

== Plot ==
Frank X. Farrell is an ace baseball player, although he compulsively downplays his achievements, claiming he could do even better except if it weren't for factors like the weather, or a cold, or other issues beyond his control. And on occasions where he does make a mistake—whether on or off the field—he can't ever let it go without an often ridiculously implausible explanation. His obsessive insistence on making excuses earns him the nickname "Alibi Ike." In the course of his first season with the Chicago Cubs, Farrell falls in love with Dolly Stevens, sister-in-law of the team's manager. Farrell's "alibi" habit prompts Dolly to walk out on him, after which he goes into a slump—which coincides with attempts by gamblers to get Farrell to throw the World Series.

== Production ==
A portion of the film was shot at Amerige Park in Fullerton, CA.

== Cast ==
- Joe E. Brown as Frank X. Farrell
- Olivia de Havilland as Dolly Stevens
- William Frawley as Cap
- Ruth Donnelly as Bess
- Roscoe Karns as Carey
- Eddie Shubert as Jack Mack
- Paul Harvey as Lefty Crawford
- Joe King as Johnson, the owner
- G. Pat Collins as Lieutenant
- Spencer Charters as Minister
- Gene Morgan as Smitty

Cast notes:

- Several popular Major League Baseball players make cameo appearances in the film, including Guy Cantrell, Dick Cox, Cedric Durst, Mike Gazella, Wally Hood, Don Hurst, Smead Jolley, Lou Koupal, Bob Meusel, Wally Rehg, and Jim Thorpe.

== See also ==
- List of baseball films
