= Arthur Aylesworth =

American actor (1883–1946)

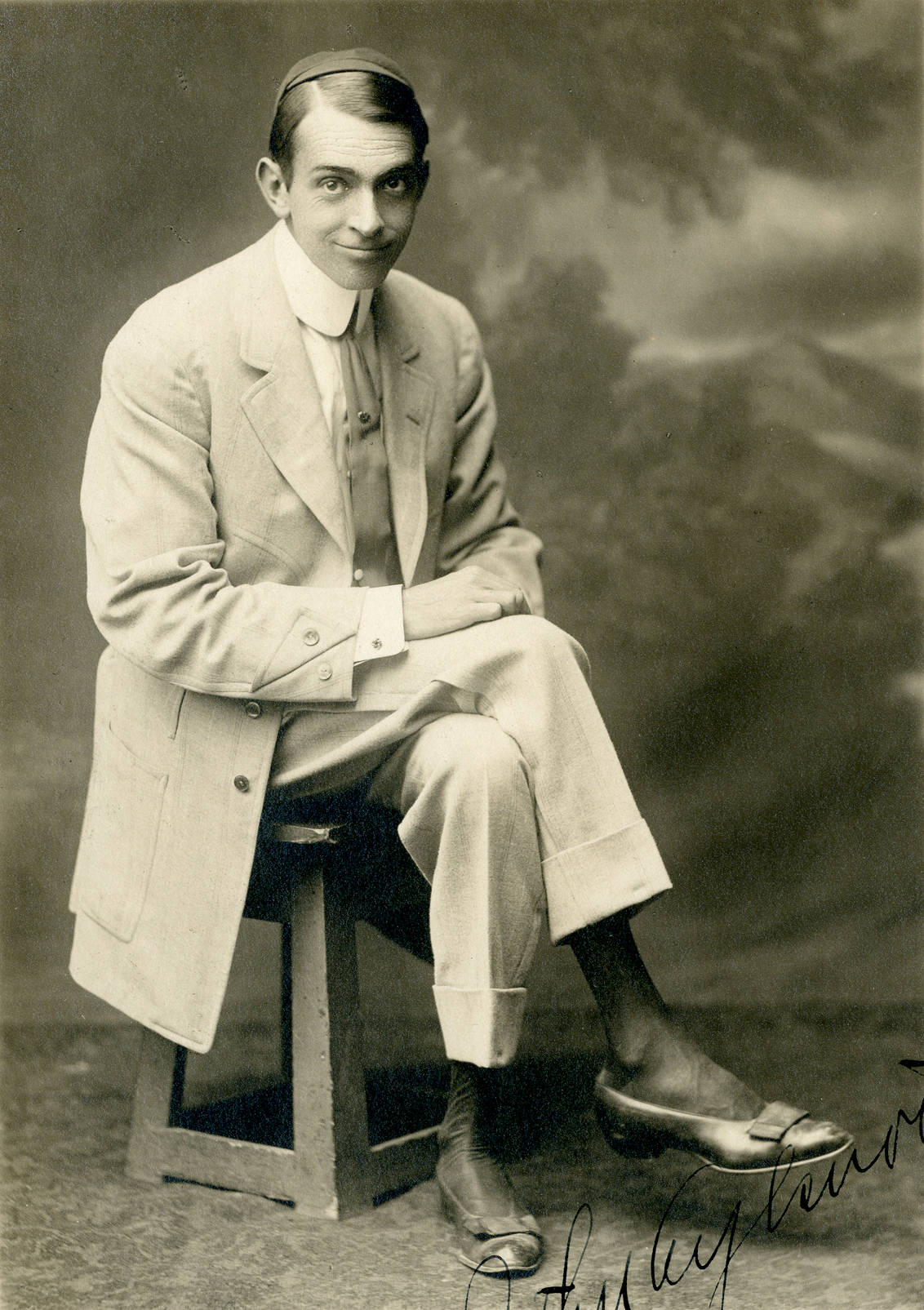
- Aylesworth in 1912
- Born: Arthur Preston Aylesworth; August 12, 1883; Apponaug, Rhode Island, U.S.
- Died: June 26, 1946 (aged 62); Los Angeles, California, U.S.
- Resting place: Chapel of the Pines Crematory
- Occupation: Actor
- Years active: 1915–1946
- Spouses: Elizabeth Aylesworth; Sadie Harris

Arthur Preston Aylesworth (August 12, 1883 – June 26, 1946) was an American stage and film actor.

== Life and career ==
The son of Georgia Aylesworth (née Howard), Arthur Preston Aylesworth was born in Apponaug, Rhode Island August 12, 1883. He came from a military family with his father and his grandfather graduates of the United States Military Academy. Aylesworth himself attended the academy for two years. He married Sadie Harris on June 19, 1912.

In his early career Aylesworth portrayed the role of Grampis in a 1907 revival of George Ade's musical Peggy from Paris in a theatre troupe led by Helen Byron for performances in Pennsylvania. He then joined the cast of Henry W. Savage's 1907 revival of The Prince of Pilsen by Gustav Luders. This show began its tour in Long Branch, New Jersey and then made its way west to Chicago where it played at the Studebaker Theater. It then toured to Missouri, and onwards west to California. After this tour he became a member of Henry Woodruff's theatre company with whom he toured the Western United States; appearing as Sylvester Temple in William M. Hough and Frank R. Adams's musical The Prince of Tonight (1909).

Aylesworth made his Broadway debut at the hotel clerk in Over Night (1911). His other Broadway appearances included the musical Follow Thru (1929), and his last show there was Yankee Point (1942). He was on the stage for over a quarter of a century and acted in many productions. In the 1930s, he became a contract player at Warner Brothers working in character actors, often uncredited. Aylesworth played in over 130 films almost exclusively from the early 1930s onwards.

Aylesworth died on June 26, 1946 in Los Angeles, California. His grave is located at Chapel of the Pines Crematory in Los Angeles.

== Selected filmography ==
- Over Night (1915)
- Dames (1934)
- The Key (1934)
- Midnight Alibi (1934)
- The Dragon Murder Case (1934)
- British Agent (1934)
- The Case of the Howling Dog (1934)
- Gentlemen Are Born (1934)
- I Am a Thief (1934)
- 6 Day Bike Rider (1934)
- Babbitt (1934)
- The Secret Bride (1934)
- Show Kids (1935 Vitaphone short)
- The Nitwits (1935)
- King of the Pecos (1936)
- The Plot Thickens (1936)
- Too Many Wives (1937)
- I Cover the War (1937)
- Fifty Roads to Town (1937)
- Speed to Spare (1937)
- Marry the Girl (1937)
- Slave Ship (1937)
- Of Human Hearts (1938)
- The Strange Case of Dr. Meade (1938)
- Test Pilot (1938) as Mr. Frank Barton
- Jesse James (1939)
- King of the Underworld (1939) as Dr. Sanders
- 6,000 Enemies (1939)
- The Oklahoma Kid (1939) as Judge Morgan
- The Return of Doctor X (1939) as Guide
- Granny Get Your Gun (1940)
- Dangerously They Live (1941)
- Sin Town (1942)
- Moontide (1942)
- Crime Doctor's Warning (1945)
