= Fury Below =

- Theatrical release poster
- Directed by: Harry L. Fraser
- Screenplay by: Phil Dunham
- Story by: G.R. Mercader
- Produced by: G.R. Mercader
- Starring: Russell Gleason; Maxine Doyle; LeRoy Mason; Sheila Terry; Matthew Betz; Rex Lease; John Merton
- Cinematography: Paul Ivano
- Edited by: Arthur A. Brooks
- Production company: George Mercader Productions
- Distributed by: Treo Film Exchanges
- Release date: November 23, 1936
- Running time: 67 minutes
- Country: United States
- Language: English

Fury Below is a 1936 American action film directed by Harry L. Fraser and written by Phil Dunham. The film stars Russell Gleason, Maxine Doyle, LeRoy Mason, Sheila Terry, Matthew Betz, Rex Lease and John Merton. The film was released on November 23, 1936, by Treo Film Exchanges.

== Cast ==
- Russell Gleason as Jim Cole III
- Maxine Doyle as Mary Norsen
- LeRoy Mason as Fred Johnson
- Sheila Terry as Claire Johnson
- Matthew Betz as Dorsky
- Rex Lease as Joe Norsen
- John Merton as Emil
- Ruth Findlay as Molly Hendricks
- Phil Dunham as Cole, Sr.
- Elliott Sullivan as Coal Miner
