= Silent Men =

1933 film

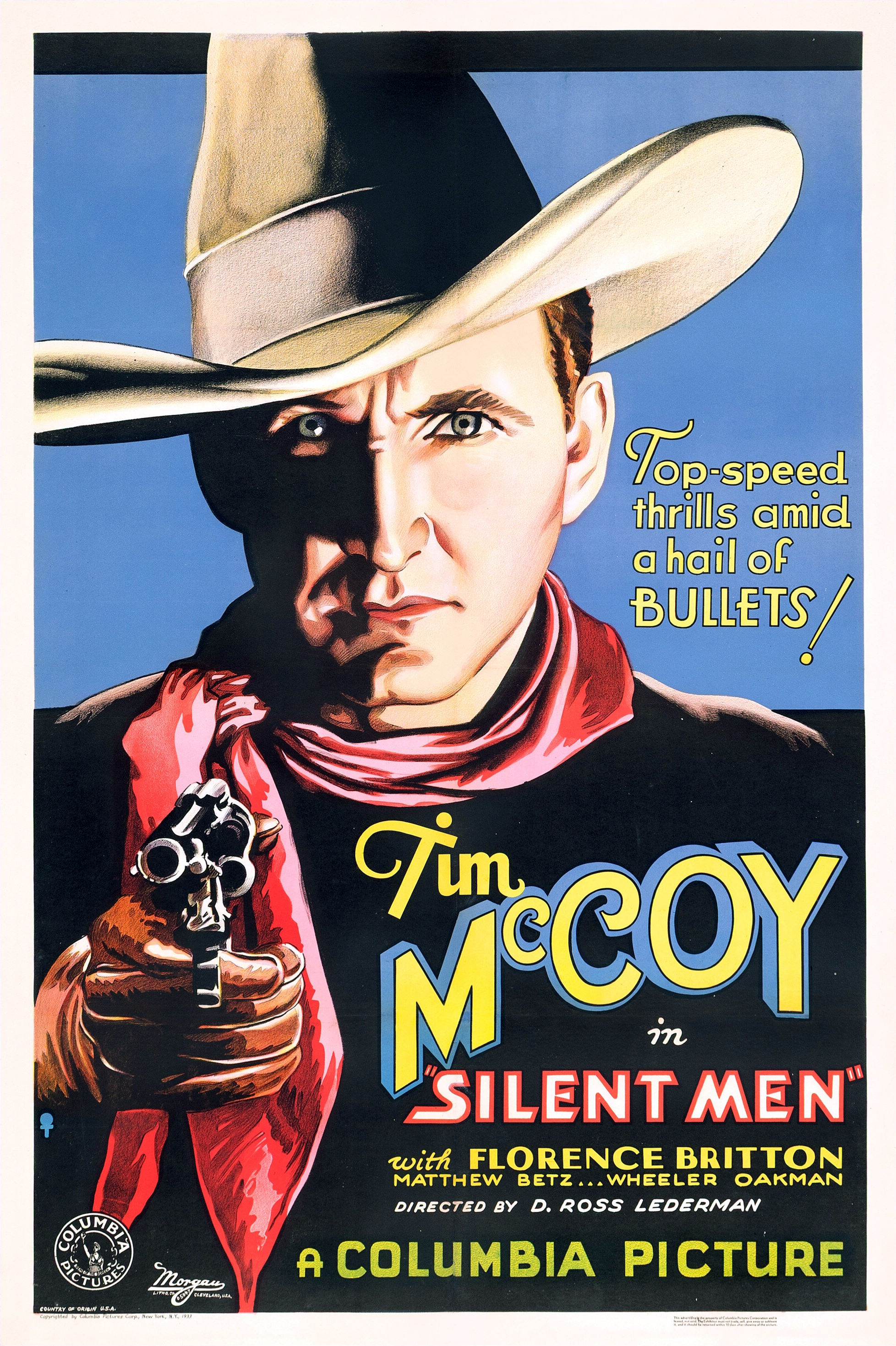
- Theatrical release poster
- Directed by: D. Ross Lederman
- Written by: Walter J. Coburn; Stuart Anthony
- Starring: Tim McCoy
- Cinematography: Benjamin H. Kline
- Edited by: Otto Meyer
- Distributed by: Columbia Pictures
- Release date: March 3, 1933
- Running time: 58 minutes
- Country: United States
- Language: English

Silent Men is a 1933 American Pre-Code Western film directed by D. Ross Lederman and starring Tim McCoy.

== Cast ==
- Tim McCoy as Tim Richards
- Florence Britton as Gwen Wilder
- J. Carrol Naish as Jack Wilder (as J. Carroll Naish)
- Wheeler Oakman as Ed Wilder
- Matthew Betz as Carl Lawler
- William V. Mong as Lawyer Oscar Sikes
- Joseph W. Girard as Two Block Burkett (as Joseph Girard)
- Syd Saylor as "Coyote Carter" (as Sid Saylor)
