= Lucky Fugitives =

- Directed by: Nick Grinde
- Written by: Robert Watson
- Produced by: Kenneth J. Bishop
- Starring: David Manners; Maxine Doyle; Reginald Hincks
- Cinematography: William Beckway; William C. Thompson
- Production company: Central Films
- Distributed by: Columbia Pictures
- Release date: 1936
- Running time: 69 minutes
- Country: Canada
- Language: English

Lucky Fugitives is a 1936 Canadian drama film directed by Nick Grinde and starring David Manners, Maxine Doyle and Reginald Hincks.

== Cast ==
- David Manners as Jack Wycoff / Cy King
- Maxine Doyle as Aline McLain
- Reginald Hincks as Donald McLain
- James McGrath as Sheriff
- Garland B. Davidson as Moriarity
- Arthur Legge-Willis as Chief of Police
- Doreen Wilson as Molly King
- Fred Bass as Kelly
- Pat Carlyle as Prince Alexis Gregory Timenoff

== Bibliography ==
- Oeter Morris. Embattled Shadows: A History of Canadian Cinema, 1895-1939. McGill-Queen's Press, 1992.
