= Motive for Revenge =

1935 American mystery film

- Directed by: Burt P. Lynwood
- Written by: Stuart Anthony
- Produced by: Larry Darmour
- Starring: Donald Cook; Irene Hervey; Doris Lloyd
- Cinematography: Herbert Kirkpatrick
- Edited by: Dwight Caldwell
- Music by: Lee Zahler
- Production company: Larry Darmour Productions
- Distributed by: Majestic Pictures
- Release date: May 15, 1935
- Running time: 60 minutes
- Country: United States
- Language: English

Motive for Revenge is a 1935 American mystery film directed by Burt P. Lynwood, written by Stuart Anthony and starring Donald Cook, Irene Hervey and Doris Lloyd.

== Plot ==
After being released from prison, a former bank teller imprisoned for embezzlement is suspected of murdering his former wife's new husband.

== Cast ==
- Donald Cook as Barry Webster
- Irene Hervey as Muriel Webster King
- Doris Lloyd as Mrs. Fleming
- Edwin Maxwell as William King
- Le Strange Millman as District Attorney Milroy
- Russell Simpson as McAllister
- John Kelly as Detective Larkin
- Edwin Argus as Detective Red
- Billy West(silent film actor) as roy
- Wheeler Oakman as Doane
- Frank LaRue as Warden
- Fern Emmett as Mrs. Kenilworthy - Housekeeper
- Dorothea Wolbert as Annie - Maid
