= The Whirlwind (1933 film) =

1933 film

- Film poster
- Directed by: D. Ross Lederman
- Written by: Walter J. Coburn; Stuart Anthony
- Starring: Tim McCoy
- Distributed by: Columbia Pictures
- Release date: April 14, 1933
- Running time: 62 minutes
- Country: United States
- Language: English

The Whirlwind is a 1933 American Pre-Code Western film directed by D. Ross Lederman and starring Tim McCoy.

== Cast ==
- Tim McCoy as Tim Reynolds
- Alice Dahl as Mollie Curtis
- Pat O'Malley as Pat Patrick
- J. Carrol Naish as 'Injun' (as Carol Naish)
- Matthew Betz as Sheriff Tate Hurley
- Joseph W. Girard as Mr. Reynolds (as Joseph Girard)
- Mary Gordon as Mrs. Curtis
