= Matthew Betz =

American actor (1881–1938)

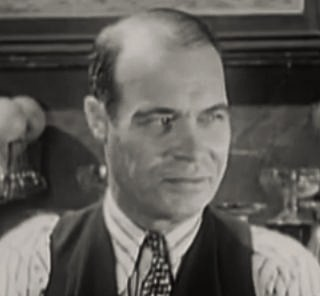
- From Broadway to Cheyenne (1932)
- Born: September 13, 1881; St. Louis, Missouri, U.S.
- Died: January 26, 1938 (aged 56); Sawtelle, California, U.S.
- Occupation: Actor
- Years active: 1914-1937

Matthew Betz (September 13, 1881 – January 26, 1938) was an American film actor. Betz was born in St. Louis, Missouri, in 1881. Following an extended career in the U.S. Cavalry, Betz spent eight years in Vaudeville. His first stage play was Ellis Island. He appeared in more than 120 films between 1914 and 1937. He died in 1938.

== Partial filmography ==
- Putting One Over (1919)
- Good References (1920)
- Pirate Gold (1920)
- Salvation Nell (1921)
- The Single Track (1921)
- Burn 'Em Up Barnes (1921)
- Boomerang Bill (1922)
- My Old Kentucky Home (1922)
- Sawdust (1923)
- The Self-Made Wife (1923)
- Anna Christie (1923)
- Let's Go (1923)
- Love's Whirlpool (1924)
- The Siren of Seville (1924)
- The Family Secret (1924)
- The Lighthouse by the Sea (1924)
- The Heart Bandit (1924)
- The Way of a Girl (1925)
- White Fang (1925)
- The White Desert (1925)
- The Unholy Three (1925)
- Oh! What a Nurse! (1926)
- The Exquisite Sinner (1926)
- Shipwrecked (1926)
- The Flame of the Yukon (1926)
- Broadway After Midnight (1927)
- The Patent Leather Kid (1927)
- The Shepherd of the Hills (1928)
- The Big City (1928)
- The Terror (1928)
- The Wedding March (1928)
- Sins of the Fathers (1928)
- Fugitives (1929)
- The Girl in the Glass Cage (1929)
- Girls Gone Wild (1929)
- Outside the Law (1930)
- Her Man (1930)
- Shooting Straight (1930)
- The Squealer (1930)
- The Single Sin (1931)
- Stout Hearts and Willing Hands (1931)
- Salvation Nell (1931)
- The Fighting Marshal (1931)
- Dynamite Denny (1932)
- The Hurricane Express (1932)
- Alias Mary Smith (1932)
- Broadway to Cheyenne (1932)
- The Western Code (1932)
- Speed Madness (1932)
- State Trooper (1933)
- Silent Men (1933)
- Under Secret Orders (1933)
- Via Pony Express (1933)
- Mystery of the Wax Museum (1933)
- Tarzan the Fearless (1933)
- The Whirlwind (1933)
- The Woman Who Dared (1933) as Racketeer
- Men of the Night (1934)
- Mississippi (1935)
- On Probation (1935)
- The Girl Who Came Back (1935)
- The E-Flat Man (1935)
- The Fighting Coward (1935)
- Fury Below (1936)
- Racing Blood (1936)
- Just My Luck (1936)
- Jail Bait (1937)
- Outcast (1937)
- Jungle Menace (1937)
