= Blue Washington =

American actor (1898–1970)

- Born: Edgar Hughes Washington; February 26, 1898; Los Angeles, California, U.S.
- Died: September 15, 1970 (aged 72); Los Angeles, California, U.S.
- Occupation: Film actor
- Years active: 1919–1961
- Baseball career
- First Baseman / pitcher
- Batted: Unknown Threw: Unknown

debut
- 1915, for the Chicago American Giants

Last appearance
- 1920, for the Kansas City Monarchs

Teams
- Chicago American Giants (1915-1916); Kansas City Monarchs (1920)

Edgar Hughes "Blue" Washington (26 February 1898 – 15 September 1970) was an American actor and baseball player who played in the Negro leagues from 1915 to 1920 as a pitcher and first baseman.

== Baseball career ==
Washington started his baseball career as a pitcher with the Chicago American Giants in 1915. He remained with Chicago in 1916. He later played with the Kansas City Monarchs in 1920, appearing in 24 documented major league games.

== Acting career ==
He appeared in 74 films between 1919 and 1957, mostly playing small, uncredited roles as a porter, a bartender, an African native (as in King Kong (1933) and Tarzan's Magic Fountain (1949), a cook, a chauffeur, a ship's crew member, a Nubian slave, and a doorman. Some of his characters had names such as "Ulambo", "Sambo" (sambo) and "Hambone". In the 1933 film Haunted Gold, he portrayed Clarence, John Wayne's comic sidekick. He had uncredited appearances in The Birth of a Nation (1915) and Gone with the Wind (1939).

== Personal ==
Edgar Hughes Washington was the son of Susie Washington and had three siblings. He became a boxer at age 14 with the stage name of "Kid Blue." His separated from his partner Marian Lenàn when their son Kenny was two years old. He was given the nickname "Blue" by film director Frank Capra when both were kids. Washington's son, Kenny Washington, a standout athlete at UCLA where he was a teammate of Jackie Robinson, broke the color barrier in the National Football League in 1946.

== Filmography ==
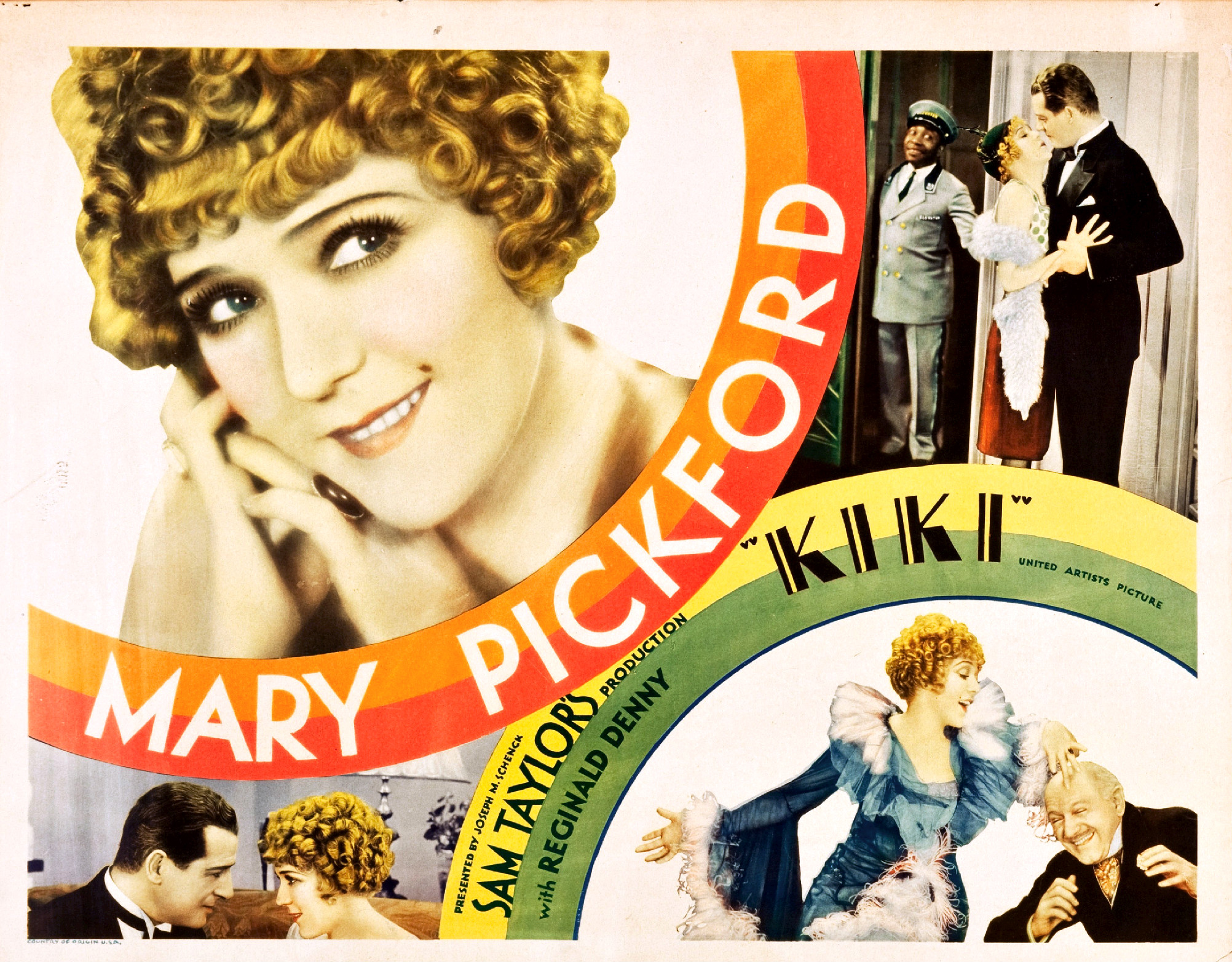
Lobby card for Kiki (1931) with Washington at upper right

- Haunted Spooks (1920, Short) as Butler (film debut) (uncredited)
- A Virginia Courtship (1921)
- The Blood Ship (1927) Minor Role
- By Whose Hand? (1927) as Eli
- The Haunted Ship (1927) as Mose
- The Smart Set (1928) as Polo Fan (uncredited)
- Wyoming (1928) as Mose
- Ransom (1928) as Oliver
- Beggars of Life (1928) as Black Mose
- Do Your Duty (1928) as Dude Jackson
- The Passion Song (1928) as Ulambo
- The Phantom City (1928) as 'Blue'
- Weary River (1929) as Prisoner in Bathtub (uncredited)
- Black Magic (1929) as Unit
- Hallelujah (1929) as Church Member (uncredited)
- Rio Rita (1929) as Fremont Bank Robber (uncredited)
- Welcome Danger (1929) as Thorne's Black Henchman (uncredited)
- Parade of the West (1930) as Sambo
- Lucky Larkin (1930) as Hambone
- Mountain Justice (1930) as Mose (uncredited)
- The Cohens and the Kellys in Africa (1930) as Native Golf Champion (uncredited)
- Desert Vengeance (1931) as Train Porter (uncredited)
- Kiki (1931) (uncredited)
- Guilty Hands (1931) as Johnny (uncredited)
- Haunted Gold (1932) as Clarence
- King Kong (1933) as Warrior (uncredited)
- King of the Arena (1933) as Sambo (uncredited)
- Her Bodyguard (1933) as Chauffeur (uncredited)
- One Year Later (1933) as Train Porter (uncredited)
- Goodbye Love (1933) as Jail Steward (uncredited)
- Roman Scandals (1933) as Litter Bearer (uncredited)
- Belle of the Nineties (1934) as Doorman at Sensation House (uncredited)
- Menace (1934) as Kenya Manservant (uncredited)
- The Whole Town's Talking (1935) as Bank Doorman (uncredited)
- The Crusades (1935) as One of Saladin's Guards (uncredited)
- The Virginia Judge (1935) as 1st Black Man (uncredited)
- Annie Oakley (1935) as Cook (uncredited)
- Escape from Devil's Island (1935) as Convict (uncredited)
- The Prisoner of Shark Island (1936) as Black Soldier at Prison (uncredited)
- The Plainsman (1936) as Black Man Dropping Box (uncredited)
- White Hunter (1936) Minor Role (uncredited)
- Nancy Steele Is Missing! (1937) as Convict (uncredited)
- Souls at Sea (1937) as Ship Slave (uncredited)
- Charlie Chan on Broadway (1937) as Doorman at Hottentot Club (uncredited)
- Ali Baba Goes to Town (1937) as Arab (uncredited)
- Wells Fargo (1937) as Sam - Coachman (uncredited)
- Tarzan's Revenge (1938) as Bearer Bringing Olaf Poison Darts (uncredited)
- Over the Wall (1938) as Convict Playing Guitar (uncredited)
- Too Hot to Handle (1938) as Native (uncredited)
- The Cowboy and the Lady (1938) as Dock Worker (uncredited)
- Kentucky (1938) as Bill (uncredited)
- Charlie Chan in Honolulu (1939) as Crewman (uncredited)
- Twelve Crowded Hours (1939) as First Bartender (uncredited)
- Rose of Washington Square (1939) as Prisoner (uncredited)
- Charlie Chan in Reno (1939) as Man in Line-Up (uncredited)
- Way Down South (1939) as Slave (uncredited)
- Gone with the Wind (1939) as Renegade's Companion (uncredited)
- The Light That Failed (1939) Bit Part (uncredited)
- The Long Voyage Home (1940) as Black Cook on Glencairn (uncredited)
- A Girl, a Guy and a Gob (1941) as Opera House Doorman (uncredited)
- Sundown (1941) as Askari Veteran (uncredited)
- Lady for a Night (1942) as Man Sitting Next to Chloe (uncredited)
- Law of the Jungle (1942) as Native (uncredited)
- Drums of the Congo (1942) as Native Bearer (uncredited)
- It Happened in Flatbush (1942) as Courtroom Spectator (uncredited)
- Tales of Manhattan (1942) as Shantytown Man (Robeson sequence) (uncredited)
- Road to Morocco (1942) as Nubian Slave (uncredited)
- To the Ends of the Earth (1948) as Binda Sha Henchman (uncredited)
- Tarzan's Magic Fountain (1949) as Native Bearer (uncredited)
- Africa Screams (1949) as Native (uncredited)
- Bomba, the Jungle Boy (1949) as Native Bearer (uncredited)
- Pinky (1949) Minor Role (uncredited)
- Tarzan and the Slave Girl (1950) as Randini Bearer Shot by Arrow (uncredited)
- I Was a Communist for the FBI (1951) as Black Man at Union Meeting (uncredited)
- Angels in the Outfield (1951) as Doorman (uncredited)
- Golden Girl (1951) as Lola's Coachman (uncredited)
- Stars and Stripes Forever (1952) as Crowd Spectator (uncredited)
- Siren of Bagdad (1953) as Palace Servant (uncredited)
- The Kid from Left Field (1953) as Train Station Porter (uncredited)
- The Wings of Eagles (1957) as Bartender at Officer's Club (uncredited)
- The Hustler (1961) as Limping Attendant at Ames Billiards (final film) (uncredited)

== Sources ==
- Atwood, Gretchen (September 6, 2016). Lost Champions: Four Men, Two Teams, and the Breaking of Pro Football's Color Line. New York: Bloomsbury USA. ISBN 9781620406007. OCLC 956379043.
