= Round-Up Time in Texas =

1937 film by Joseph Kane

- Theatrical release poster
- Directed by: Joseph Kane
- Written by: Oliver Drake
- Produced by: Nat Levine
- Starring: Gene Autry; Smiley Burnette; Maxine Doyle
- Cinematography: William Nobles
- Edited by: Lester Orlebeck
- Production company: Republic Pictures
- Distributed by: Republic Pictures
- Release date: February 28, 1937 (U.S.)
- Running time: 61 minutes
- Country: United States
- Language: English

Round-Up Time in Texas is a 1937 American Western film directed by Joseph Kane and written by Oliver Drake. The film stars Gene Autry, Smiley Burnette, and Maxine Doyle. Despite its title, the majority of the film takes place in South Africa.

The film is about a cowboy who delivers a herd of horses for his brother, a diamond prospector whose work has attracted the interest of a bunch of badguys.

== Plot ==
After rounding up a large herd of horses in Texas, Gene Autry (Gene Autry) receives a telegram from his brother Tex (Ken Cooper), who is mining diamonds in South Africa. The message states that Tex and his partner, Edward Barclay, have discovered a big strike in the Valley of Suspicion and urges Gene to bring as many horses as possible to Dunbar, South Africa, where he can contact John Cardigan (LeRoy Mason), the saloon owner who grubstaked Tex and Barclay. Gene and his sidekick Frog (Smiley Burnette) quickly arrange for passage overseas and accompany the horses to South Africa.

Meanwhile, Tex and his partner, while on their way back to Dunbar from their mine, are ambushed by Cardigan's men. Barclay is killed and Tex wounded but able to escape. Cardigan wants sole control of the mine. Sometime later, Gene and Frog arrive at Dunbar and hire Barkey McCuskey, a small-time English con artist, as their auctioneer for when they sell their horses. Worried that Tex is not in Dunbar, Gene stoutly defends his brother when Cardigan tells him he is being sought for the murder of Barclay. Gene grows suspicious of Cardigan when he sees that the saloon owner tampered with another telegram from Tex. Cardigan in turn grows jealous as Gene who becomes friendly with saloon singer Gwen (Maxine Doyle), who is Barclay's daughter.

The next day Gene sees Cardigan's servant Namba (Corny Anderson) at the auction wearing the belt buckle that Gene gave to Tex, and Gene becomes more suspicious of Cardigan, whose henchman, Craig Johnson (Dick Wessel), plans to kill the Texans that night. Johnson arranges to have Gene and Frog arrested after he gives uncut diamonds to Frog in return for a horse. The South African Constabulary explain that it is illegal to have uncut diamonds without a license. The next day, while the police take Gene and Frog to Kimberly for trial, the Texans manage to escape. Later they find Cardigan as he is making his way through the jungle with Johnson, Gwen, and Barkey in search of the diamond mine.

The group is captured by natives and brought before Chief Bosuto (Buddy Williams). Just as they are about to be sacrificed, Frog wins the chief over by teaching his children to sing. The chief agrees to let the others go if Frog stays behind to teach his children more music. Frog and Cardigan stay with the natives while Gene, Barkey, and Gwen are led away by Namba. After the police arrive and free Cardigan, and head to Cardigan's jungle hideout, where Tex is being held a slave. Gene arrives and frees his brother and the other workers. Cardigan and Johnson attempt to escape, taken Gwen as a hostage, but Frog catches up with Johnson and Gene fights with Cardigan, who falls from a cliff to his death. The police arrive and capture the rest of Cardigan's gang. Later on the ship returning to Texas, while Frog sings along with Bosuto's children, Gene and Gwen kiss.

== Cast ==
- Gene Autry as Gene Autry
- Smiley Burnette as Frog
- Maxine Doyle as Gwen Barkley
- The Cabin Kids as Chief Bosuto's Children
- Champion the Wonder Horse as Gene's Horse
- LeRoy Mason as John Cardigan
- Earle Hodgins as Barkey McCusky
- Dick Wessel as Henchman Craig Johnson
- Buddy Williams as Chief Bosuto
- Elmer Fain as Chief Bosuto's Son
- Corny Anderson as Namba
- Frankie Marvin as Cowboy / Soldier
- Ken Cooper as Tex Autry

== Production ==
=== Stuntwork ===
- Ken Cooper
- Joe Yrigoyen

=== Filming locations ===
- Iverson Ranch, 1 Iverson Lane, Chatsworth, Los Angeles, California, USA

=== Soundtrack ===
- "When the Bloom Is on the Sage" (Fred Howard, Nat Vincent) by Gene Autry, Smiley Burnette, and cowhands
- "When the Bloom Is on the Sage" (Fred Howard, Nat Vincent) by Gene Autry, Smiley Burnette, The Cabin Kids, and Buddy Williams at the end
- "Old Chisholm Trail (Come a Ti Yi Yippee Yippee Yay)" (Traditional) by Gene Autry and Smiley Burnette
- "Drink Old England Dry" (Traditional) by Maxine Doyle and bar patrons
- "Uncle Noah's Ark" (Gene Autry, Smiley Burnette, Nick Manoloff) by Gene Autry and Smiley Burnette
- "Prairie Rose" (Sam H. Stept, Sidney D. Mitchell) by Gene Autry
- "Jacob Drink" (Traditional Polish folksong) by an unidentified man in the bar
- "Silver Threads Among the Gold" (H.P. Danks) played on a record
- "African Chant" by natives
- "Moon of Desire" by Gene Autry and natives
- "Voice Improvisation" by Smiley Burnette and The Cabin Kids
- "She'll Be Coming 'Round the Mountain" (Traditional)
- "On Revival Day" (Andy Razaf) by The Cabin Kids
- "Caveman" by Gene Autry
- "Dinah" (Harry Akst, Sam Lewis, Joe Young) by Smiley Burnette and The Cabin Kids
