= Son of a Sailor =

1933 film by Lloyd Bacon

- Theatrical release poster
- Directed by: Lloyd Bacon
- Screenplay by: Alfred A. Cohn; Paul Gerard Smith; Ernest Pagano; H. M. Walker
- Starring: Joe E. Brown; Jean Muir; Frank McHugh; Thelma Todd; Johnny Mack Brown; Sheila Terry
- Cinematography: Ira H. Morgan
- Edited by: James Gibbon
- Production company: First National Pictures
- Distributed by: Warner Bros. Pictures
- Release date: December 23, 1933
- Running time: 73 minutes
- Country: United States
- Language: English

Son of a Sailor is a 1933 American comedy film directed by Lloyd Bacon and written by Alfred A. Cohn, Paul Gerard Smith, Ernest Pagano, and H. M. Walker. The film stars Joe E. Brown, Jean Muir, Frank McHugh, Thelma Todd, Johnny Mack Brown, and Sheila Terry. The film was released by Warner Bros. Pictures on December 23, 1933.

== Cast ==
- Joe E. Brown as 'Handsome' Callahan
- Jean Muir as Helen Farnsworth
- Frank McHugh as 'Gaga'
- Thelma Todd as The Baroness
- Johnny Mack Brown as 'Duke'
- Sheila Terry as Genevieve
- George Blackwood as Armstrong
- Merna Kennedy as Isabel
- Kenneth Thomson as Williams
- Samuel S. Hinds as Admiral Farnsworth
- Noel Francis as Queenie
- Arthur Vinton as Vincent
- George Irving as Rear Admiral Lee
- Garry Owen as Sailor Johnson

== Home media ==
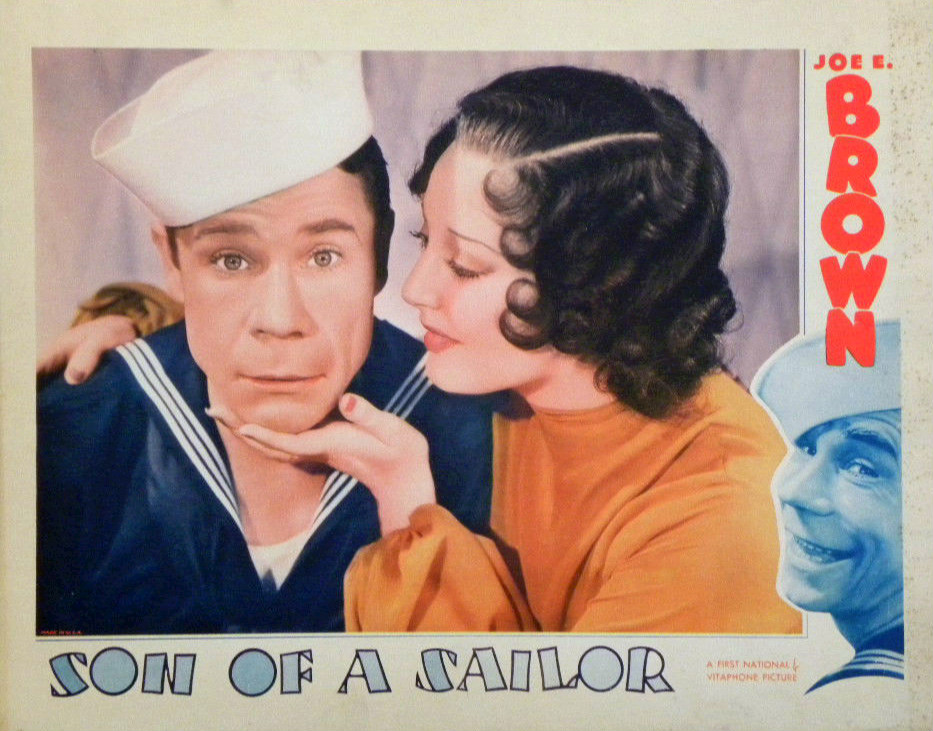
Lobby card for the film
