= 6 Day Bike Rider =

- Theatrical release poster
- Directed by: Lloyd Bacon
- Screenplay by: Earl Baldwin
- Story by: Earl Baldwin
- Produced by: Sam Bischoff
- Starring: Joe E. Brown; Maxine Doyle; Frank McHugh; Gordon Westcott; Arthur Aylesworth; Lottie Williams
- Cinematography: Warren Lynch
- Edited by: George Amy
- Music by: Leo F. Forbstein
- Production company: First National Pictures
- Distributed by: Warner Bros. Pictures
- Release date: October 20, 1934
- Running time: 69 minutes
- Country: United States
- Language: English

6 Day Bike Rider is a 1934 American comedy film directed by Lloyd Bacon, written by Earl Baldwin, and starring Joe E. Brown, Maxine Doyle, Frank McHugh, Gordon Westcott, Arthur Aylesworth and Lottie Williams. The film's production took eleven days from July 9, 1934. There was a multi-bicyclist collision during close-up filming. Reggie McNamara, who was known as the "Iron Man" due to his 108 six-day bicycle races, had his film debut as one of the racers. It was released by Warner Bros. on October 20, 1934.

== Plot ==
While departing from choir practice in their small town one night, Wilfred Simpson and his fiancée Phyllis Jenkins meet trick cyclist Harry St. Clair, who wishes to retrieve his bicycles from the railroad station where Wilfred works as a clerk. At the station, Harry exploits Wilfred's preoccupation by walking Phyllis home. Annoyed, Wilfred furiously vents his anger by hissing at Harry's performance at the town theatre the next evening. Harry challenges him to do better, and when Wilfred accepts, Harry once again vanishes with Phyllis the following night. Mabel, Harry's wife and assistant, jealously misleads Wilfred into believing that Harry has run away to marry Phyllis. Wilfred rouses the entire town to stop them, but is unfortunately exposed as extremely foolish when he discovers they are merely talking on the front porch of the Jenkins family house. Embarrassed, Phyllis breaks off her engagement, causing Wilfred to announce that he is leaving town forever. On the road, he collides with his friend Clinton Hemmings, who reveals his plans to enter the Six Day Bike Race. Having failed at everything he has tried in his life up to that point, Wilfred signs on as his partner, hoping to impress Phyllis and win her back, and the two obtain jobs as bicycle messengers in order to covertly practice for the race. One day, while delivering a meal and a message to Harry's hotel room, Wilfred overhears a female voice coming from inside. Imagining that the woman is Phyllis, he barges in and punches the figure, only to be arrested and jailed when she is revealed as Mabel. On the day of the event, the race begins without him, with Clinton riding alone. Fortunately, having been bailed out of jail by a repentant Phyllis, Wilfred races on a borrowed bike to the velodrome, arriving at the last minute and entering the competition just in time. An ether-saturated cloth, caught in his rear-wheel spokes, also proves advantageous as the other riders are overcome from the fumes when they try to pass him. The race culminates in a showdown between Harry and Wilfred, but despite several setbacks, Wilfred and Clinton ultimately emerge victorious. Wilfred and Phyllis eventually marry and soon their regular bicycle outings include their infant son.

== Cast ==
- Joe E. Brown as Wilfred Simpson
- Maxine Doyle as Phyllis Jenkins
- Frank McHugh as Clinton Hemmings
- Gordon Westcott as Harry St. Clair
- Arthur Aylesworth as Col. Jenkins
- Lottie Williams as Mrs. Jenkins
- Dorothy Christy as Mrs. Mabel St. Clair
- Ward Bond as First officer

== Production ==
Production began on July 9, 1934, by First National Pictures and took eleven days. During production, children could meet the star Joe E. Brown and talk to him. Warner Brothers distributed the film. Bacon based the film on six-day racing, in which a team of two people would circle a wooden track on a bicycle for six days. The team typically consisted of a man and a woman, who took turns riding. Reggie McNamara, known as the “Iron Man” because of his 108 six-day bicycle races, played the part of one of the racers in his film debut.

A multi-cyclist collision started when a bicycle's wheel collapsed, causing 16 bicyclists to hit the motorcycle of a cameraman who was filming close to the action. Nine of the bicyclists were hurt, one of whom was critically injured.

== Release ==
6 Day Bike Rider was released theatrically in 1934 with the featurettes Darling Enemy, starring Gertrude Niesen, the Merrie Melodies cartoon Rhythm in the Bow and recent news. On November 24, 1934, in Plainfield, New Jersey, the film was screened during events that were based around the film. The two-day-long events included a "Recreation Field Day of Joe. E. Brown's 6 Day Bike Rider", a costume bicycle parade, a trick rider, a children's show, and a screening of 6 Day Bike Rider at the Oxford Theater.

== Reception ==
A review in The Owensboro Messenger said, "6 Day Bike Rider is a hilarious comedy of thrills and spills on racing track." An Arizona Daily Star article stated that 6 Day Bike Rider is "said to be one of the most humorous pictures of Joe. E Brown's long comedy career." AllMovie reviewer Hal Erickson wrote in 2020, "Even though the fad which inspired it has passed into history, Six-Day Bike Rider remains fresh and funny today."

A Variety reviewer was unimpressed with the performances, stating that the film has a "foolish story" and concluded their review by saying, "With Director Lloyd Bacon, it was a case of being handed a bowl of tapioca and told to make caviar." A 2017 TV Guide review states, "Unusually poor outing for Brown finds him entering a six-day bicycle race, which he wins, naturally".

== See also ==
- List of films about bicycles and cycling
