= You Said a Mouthful =

1932 film

- Theatrical release poster
- Directed by: Lloyd Bacon
- Screenplay by: Robert Lord; Bolton Mallory
- Story by: William B. Dover
- Produced by: Raymond Griffith
- Starring: Joe E. Brown; Ginger Rogers; Preston Foster; Allen Hoskins; Harry Gribbon; Edwin Maxwell; Sheila Terry
- Cinematography: Richard Towers
- Edited by: Owen Marks
- Production company: First National Pictures
- Distributed by: Warner Bros. Pictures
- Release date: December 8, 1932
- Running time: 70 minutes
- Country: United States
- Language: English

You Said a Mouthful is a 1932 American pre-Code comedy film directed by Lloyd Bacon and written by Robert Lord and Bolton Mallory. The film stars Joe E. Brown, Ginger Rogers, Preston Foster, Allen Hoskins, Harry Gribbon, Edwin Maxwell and Sheila Terry. The film was released by Warner Bros. Pictures on December 8, 1932.

== Plot ==
Joe Holt works for the Armstrong Rubber Goods company and believes that he has invented an unsinkable bathing suit. His colleagues mock Joe behind his back and fool him into thinking that his boss likes the swimsuit idea.

Joe travels to California to inherit his aunt's fortune, which he intends to use to finance the manufacture of his swimsuit. However, his aunt died broke. Joe befriends a servant's son, Sam Wellington, and together take a boat to Santa Catalina Island.

Socialite Alice Brandon mistakes Joe for a famous swimmer with his same name. She has just parted ways with channel swimmer Ed Dover and wants Ed to lose an upcoming channel race, so she persuades Joe to enter. Sam must teach Joe how to swim. The real swimmer Joe Holt finds himself in jail after being accused as an impostor. Joe impresses Alice by winning the race.

== Cast ==
- Joe E. Brown as Joe Holt
- Ginger Rogers as Alice Brandon
- Preston Foster as Ed Dover
- Allen Hoskins as Sam Wellington (credited as "Farina")
- Harry Gribbon as Harry Daniels
- Edwin Maxwell as Dr. Vorse
- Sheila Terry as Cora Norton
- Walter Walker as Tom Brandon
