= Babbitt (1934 film) =

1934 film by William Keighley

- Directed by: William Keighley
- Written by: Mary C. McCall, Jr. Tom Reed (adaptation); Niven Busch (adaptation); Ben Markson (additional dialogue)
- Based on: Babbitt; 1922 novel by Sinclair Lewis
- Produced by: Samuel Bischoff (uncredited)
- Starring: Aline MacMahon; Guy Kibbee; Claire Dodd
- Cinematography: Arthur L. Todd
- Edited by: Jack Killifer
- Music by: Leo F. Forbstein
- Production company: First National Pictures
- Distributed by: First National Pictures
- Release date: December 8, 1934
- Running time: 74-75 minutes
- Country: United States
- Language: English

Babbitt is an American 1934 film adaptation of the novel of the same name by Sinclair Lewis directed by William Keighley and starring Aline MacMahon, Guy Kibbee and Claire Dodd. The screenplay is about a staid small-town businessman who gets ensnared in shady dealings.

== Cast ==
- Aline MacMahon as Myra Babbitt
- Guy Kibbee as George F. Babbitt
- Claire Dodd as Tanis Judique
- Maxine Doyle as Verona Babbitt
- Glen Boles as Ted Babbitt
- Minor Watson as Paul F. Reisling
- Minna Gombell as Zilla Reisling
- Alan Hale as Charlie McKelvey
- Berton Churchill as Judge Virgil Thompson
- Russell Hicks as Commissioner Lyle Gurnee
- Nan Grey as Eunice Littlefield (as Nan Gray)
- Walter Walker as Luke Ethorne
- Arthur Aylesworth as Zeke
- Addison Richards as District Attorney
- Harry Tyler as Martin Gunch
- Arthur Hoyt as Willis Ivans
- Mary Treen as Miss McGoun
- Hattie McDaniel as Rosalie (uncredited)
