= Song of the West =

1930 film

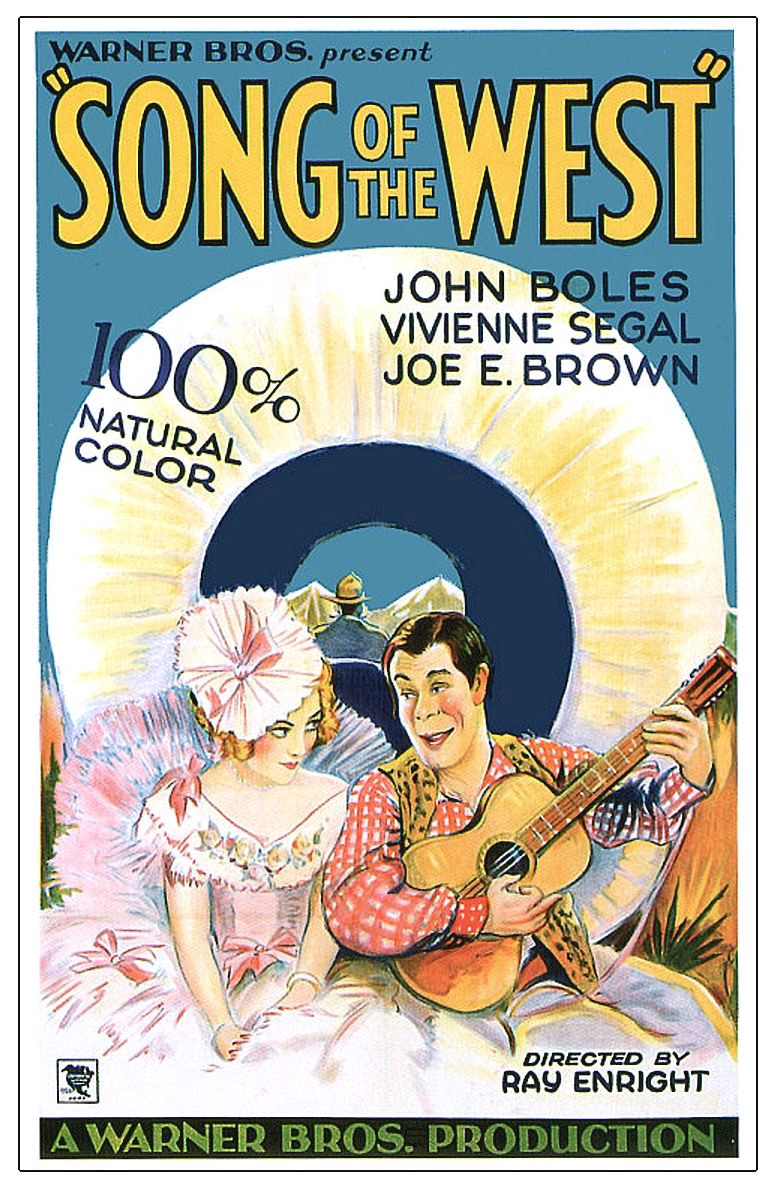
- Directed by: Ray Enright
- Written by: Harvey F. Thew
- Based on: Rainbow by Oscar Hammerstein II and Laurence Stallings
- Starring: John Boles; Vivienne Segal; Joe E. Brown
- Cinematography: Devereaux Jennings (Technicolor)
- Edited by: George Marks
- Music by: Harry Akst; Grant Clarke; Oscar Hammerstein II and Vincent Youmans
- Color process: Technicolor Process 3
- Production company: Warner Bros. Pictures
- Distributed by: Warner Bros. Pictures
- Release date: March 15, 1930
- Running time: 82 minutes
- Country: United States
- Language: English

Song of the West is a 1930 American Pre-Code musical Western film directed by Ray Enright, released by Warner Bros. Pictures, and photographed entirely in Technicolor. It was based on the 1928 Broadway musical Rainbow by Vincent Youmans (music), Oscar Hammerstein II (lyrics) and Laurence Stallings (book). It starred John Boles, Joe E. Brown, and Vivienne Segal, and was the first all-color all-talking feature to be filmed entirely outdoors, as well as being the first all-color all-talking Western feature.

== Plot ==
Set during the late 1840s, when the American West was still largely untamed, Song of the West tells the story of Captain Stanton, a once-promising army officer whose career was ruined by a violent incident stemming from a rivalry with Major Davolo over a woman named Lotta—a flirtatious “light-o’-love” whose divided affections sparked jealousy. During a heated confrontation years earlier, Stanton shot Davolo (or was believed to have), forcing him to flee the army in disgrace before a court-martial could be carried out.

By the time the story begins, Stanton has been living as a rugged scout on the frontier, hardened in appearance with buckskin clothing, long hair, and a beard. He arrives at Fort Independence just as a military dance is underway, on the eve of a wagon train’s departure for California. The festivities are abruptly cut short when orders arrive that troops must escort the caravan due to reports of hostile Native American activity.

At the fort is Virginia, the cultured and idealistic daughter of the commanding colonel. She is admired by both Lieutenant Singleton and Davolo. When Stanton appears, Singleton recognizes him immediately as his former friend, while Virginia is drawn to the mysterious stranger. Stanton, believing himself unrecognizable, is shaken but thrilled to be near army life again—and especially near Virginia, with whom he quickly falls in love.

His past catches up with him almost immediately. Davolo recognizes Stanton, and their long-standing feud reignites. During a violent altercation, Davolo attempts to draw his revolver, but Stanton overpowers him; in the struggle, the gun discharges, killing Davolo. Stanton is arrested and imprisoned at the fort on a murder charge.

While in jail, Stanton reunites with Hasty, a good-natured, comic mule tender who has been locked up for drunkenness. With help from Singleton—who remains loyal despite his own feelings for Virginia—they orchestrate an escape. Their opportunity comes when it is discovered that a newly arrived minister, meant to accompany the wagon train, has broken his leg and cannot travel. Hasty steals the minister’s clothing and persuades Stanton to disguise himself as the clergyman, allowing him to escape custody and remain close to Virginia.

Disguised as the parson, Stanton joins the wagon train as it begins its arduous journey westward through the Rocky Mountains, across desert landscapes, over Truckee Pass, and toward the goldfields of California. Along the way, he and Virginia conduct secret romantic meetings under the cover of night. Though she soon sees through his disguise, she keeps his secret, and their love deepens.

Meanwhile, Singleton’s affection for Virginia grows into anguish when he realizes her heart belongs to Stanton. Concerned for her future—and perhaps motivated by jealousy—he pressures Stanton to leave the wagon train before his true identity is exposed, threatening to reveal him to her father if he does not. Stanton, torn between love and honor, agrees to sacrifice his happiness and leaves the caravan at the mining camp of Red Dog, ending his relationship with Virginia. Lotta, who has reappeared at the fort and later along the trail, attempts to rekindle her relationship with Stanton, but he rejects her.

Virginia, however, quickly senses Stanton’s absence. Refusing to accept his decision, she defies her father and social expectations, returns to Red Dog, and reunites with Stanton, choosing to share his uncertain life on the frontier. The two are married and drift together through a series of rough mining camps.

Eventually settling in San Francisco, Stanton establishes a gaming house with the money he earned from gambling. Though Virginia initially tries to adapt and appears outwardly content, she becomes increasingly disillusioned with the morally questionable environment and longs for the refinement and stability of her former life among the military elite.

Tensions reach a breaking point when members of her old social circle—including soldiers from her father’s regiment—arrive in the city. Virginia urges Stanton to close the gambling establishment to avoid humiliation, but conflict erupts when patrons accuse him of cheating. When the soldiers appear, Virginia is both overjoyed and ashamed of her circumstances. Stanton, recognizing that he has become an obstacle to her happiness, reacts with bitterness and jealousy. He mocks the army, sings its songs contemptuously, and publicly humiliates Virginia. In a final act of spite and self-destruction, he openly embraces Lotta, driving Virginia away.

At Singleton’s urging, Virginia returns to her father, though she remains emotionally devoted to Stanton. Left alone, Stanton spirals downward. He loses his fortune, wanders in search of gold, and eventually becomes a broken derelict. Throughout his decline, Hasty remains steadfastly loyal, protecting him and offering comic relief. In one dramatic episode, Hasty confronts two men seeking to kill Stanton and is fatally shot while defending his friend.

Meanwhile, Stanton’s self-destructive guilt deepens. He even seeks death by provoking fights, hoping someone will kill him, but fails. Ultimately, Singleton finds him and appeals to his sense of honor, insisting that he still has worth and urging him to redeem himself by returning to the army.

Stanton finally accepts this path to redemption. Given the choice between punishment and service, he reenlists as a common soldier, humbly returning to the life he once abandoned. Through discipline and renewed purpose, he regains his dignity.

In the end, Virginia, whose love has remained constant despite everything, is reunited with Stanton. His redemption restores her faith, and she welcomes him back. The story closes on a hopeful note, with the couple reconciled and looking toward a shared future, symbolized by Stanton’s restored place in the army and the enduring ideals of honor, love, and belonging.

== Cast ==
- John Boles as Captain Stanton
- Vivienne Segal as Virginia
- Joe E. Brown as Hasty
- Marie Wells as Lotta
- Sam Hardy as Davolo
- Marion Byron as Penny
- Eddie Gribbon as Sergeant Major
- Edward Martindel as Colonel
- Rudolph Cameron as Lt. Singleton

== Production ==
A portable recording rig was created to record Vitaphone discs for the film, which was being filmed on location at Lone Pine, California. The rig was reported to have cost $300,000 to make. The film was finished in June 1929.

== Reception ==
This was Boles's follow-up to his successful role in The Desert Song (1929). Following a number of dismal previews, however, Warner Bros. Pictures shortened the film by two reels, removing some of the musical content in the process. In spite of being delayed for almost a year before release, the film had a worldwide gross of $920,000 and the featured songs were quite popular, leading RCA Victor to hire Boles, who was then at the height of his popularity, to record "The One Girl" and "West Wind" for commercial release.

== Songs ==
All written by Vincent Youmans and Oscar Hammerstein II unless indicated

- "The One Girl" (sung by Boles)
- "I Like You As You Are" (sung by Boles)
- "Come Back to Me" (sung by Boles and Vivienne Segal) (by Harry Akst and Grant Clarke)
- "The Bride Was Dressed in White" (sung by Joe E. Brown)
- "West Wind" (sung by John Boles) (music by Vincent Youmans, lyric by J. Russell Robinson)
- "Kingdom Coming" (sung by chorus) (authors unknown)

== Preservation ==
Alleged recently discovered fragment showing the wagon train in the film.

Since the 1970s, no complete copies of the film are known to exist. The complete soundtrack survives.

Although the film's copyright was renewed in 1956, it does not appear to have been shown on television. 16mm prints of early Warner Bros. films, including sound-on-disc films, were made in the 1950s for distribution as local television package (see Associated Artists Productions), and some two-color Technicolor films now survive (in black and white) only because of those prints. Some pre-1931 sound films made by Warner Bros. and First National have been lost because United Artists (former rights holder of pre-1950 WB films) donated most films to foreign film preservation or private collectors and presently it is impossible to search for a film after when UA donated to the Library of Congress the earliest surviving preprint material from the pre-1950 (including some pre-1931) film library of Warner Bros. and post-1923 First National library.

In a June 2011 forum discussion, a small fragment, running about a minute, was claimed to have been discovered in the UK and identified as being from the film. It is available on DVD from the Warner Archive Collection. One short fragment of an original color print was found at the BFI National Archive in 2018.

== See also ==
- List of lost films
- List of incomplete or partially lost films
- List of early color feature films
- List of early Warner Bros. sound and talking features
