= The Sphinx (1933 film) =

1933 film by Phil Rosen, Wilfred Lucas

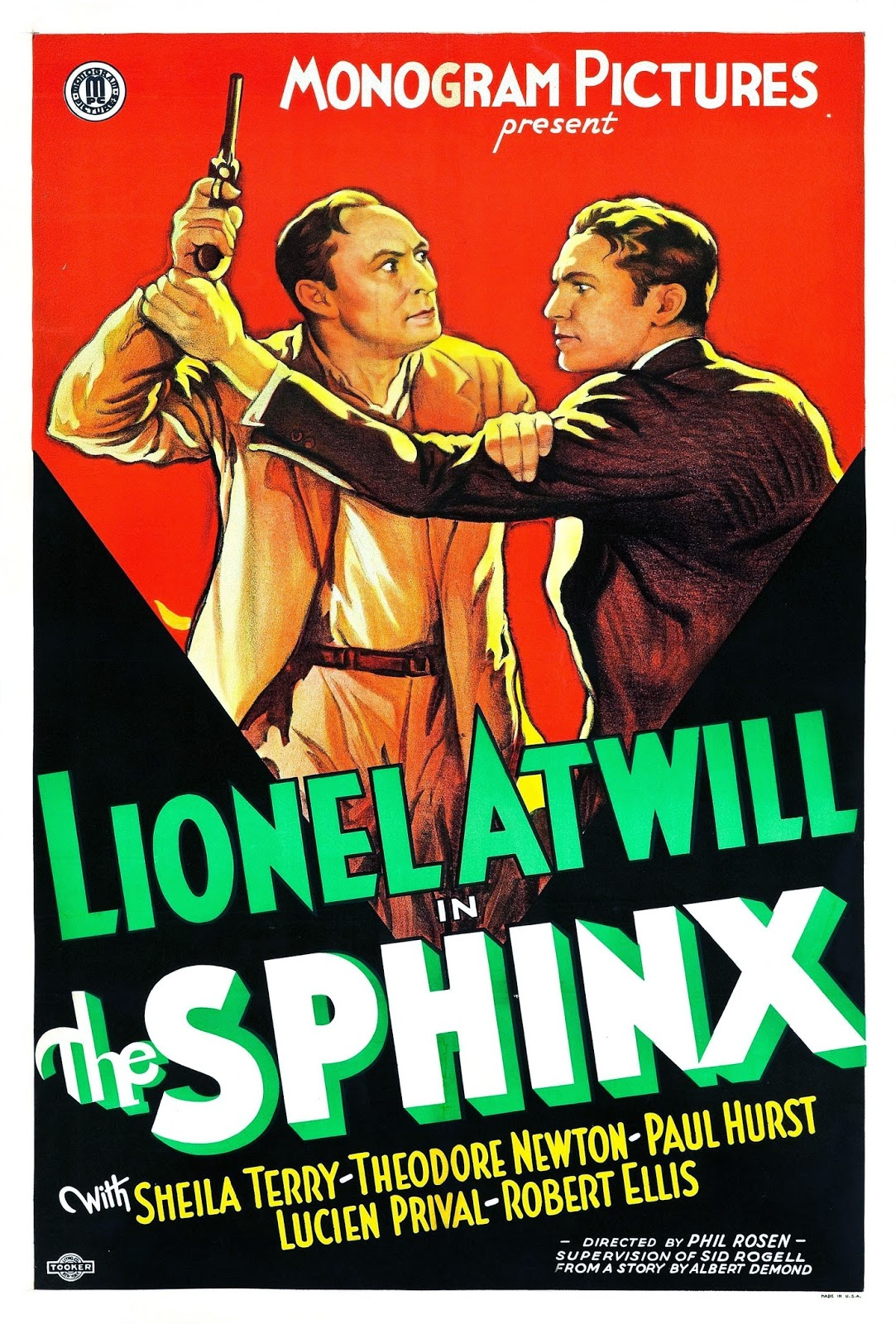
- Film poster
- Directed by: Phil Rosen; Wilfred Lucas (uncredited)
- Written by: Albert DeMond (writer)
- Produced by: Albert S. Rogell (producer)
- Starring: Lionel Atwill; Sheila Terry; Theodore Newton
- Cinematography: Gilbert Warrenton
- Edited by: Doane Harrison
- Production company: Trem Carr Pictures
- Distributed by: Monogram Pictures
- Release date: June 1, 1933
- Running time: 64 minutes
- Country: United States
- Language: English

The Sphinx is a 1933 American pre-Code mystery drama film directed by Phil Rosen. The film was remade by William Beaudine as Phantom Killer in 1942.

== Plot ==
A man comes out of the office of "Garfield Investment Company". He meets the janitor in the stairs and asks him for a match, and then what time it is. "It's nine" the Italian-American janitor Luigi Bacciagalupi answers and wants to know from which apartment he came out. The man leaves without answering. Shortly after, the janitor finds a dead man in the office of "Garfield Investment Company". Newspaperman Burton from the Chronicle is there to talk with the inspector. Before he can see him he talks with the watching police officer, and after a while, realizes that the Garfield Investment Company just that morning went bankrupt. "Another broker went down the flush". The janitor recognizes on the police records the man who came out of the office, Mr. Breen. During the trial he sticks to what he has seen and what he has heard, though two different doctors testify that Mr. Breen is deaf and mute since birth.

Young chronicle newspaperman Jerry Crane, in love with his good-looking girl colleague, has a feeling that Breen is a strange guy and tries to convince her not to go for interview to his house. Meantime a young broker tells him he has a hint, if he gets enough money for it. Breen comes to see the young broker before at half past eight the Burton comes to his house. A second time Mr. Breen asks for the time after seeing his victim. The puzzling case has the parallel love story of the two newspaper-people of the Chronicle. While Burton, who wants to marry Crane, is skeptical about Breen, Crane is fascinated by Breen and writes a series of articles about him. When Inspector Riley thinks he saw Breen hearing the playing of the piano when they are in his house, the next morning a third dead man is on the list.

== Cast ==
- Lionel Atwill as Jerome Breen
- Sheila Terry as Jerry Crane
- Theodore Newton as Jack Burton
- Paul Hurst as Detective Terrence Aloysius Hogan
- Luis Alberni as Luigi Baccigalupi
- Robert Ellis as Inspector James Riley
- Lucien Prival as Jenks, the Butler
- Lillian Leighton as Mother Werner
- Paul Fix as Dave Werner
- George 'Gabby' Hayes as Det. Casey

== Sources ==
- Young, R. G. (2000). The Encyclopedia of Fantastic Film: Ali Baba to Zombies. Bloomsbury Academic. ISBN 1-55783-269-2.
