= Stuart Anthony =

American screenwriter

- Born: April 10, 1891; Tattnall County, Georgia, United States
- Died: April 27, 1942 (aged 51); Beverly Hills, California, United States
- Occupation: Writer
- Years active: 1928-1941 (film)

Stuart Anthony (1891–1942) was an American screenwriter. He worked on the screenplays of two Charlie Chan films.

== Selected filmography ==
- The Floating College (1928)
- Stool Pigeon (1928)
- The Fighting Sheriff (1931)
- Desert Vengeance (1931)
- Police Court (1932)
- Whistlin' Dan (1932)
- End of the Trail (1932)
- Strangers of the Evening (1932)
- Lena Rivers (1932)
- State Trooper (1933)
- Silent Men (1933)
- Love Is Dangerous (1933)
- The Whirlwind (1933)
- Nothing More Than a Woman (1934)
- Frontier Marshal (1934)
- Happy Landing (1934)
- Charlie Chan in London (1934)
- Charlie Chan in Paris (1935)
- Motive for Revenge (1935)
- Mutiny Ahead (1935)
- Burning Gold (1936)
- Desert Gold (1936)
- Illegal Traffic (1938)
- Tom Sawyer, Detective (1938)
- Saga of Death Valley (1939)
- The Biscuit Eater (1940)
- The Ranger and the Lady (1940)
- Along the Rio Grande (1941)
- The Monster and the Girl (1941)
- The Shepherd of the Hills (1941)

== Bibliography ==
- Jeff Jaeckle. Film Dialogue. Columbia University Press, 25 Jun 2013.
