= Maxine Doyle =

American actress

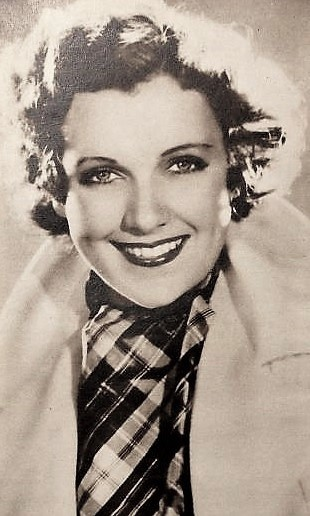
- Doyle in New Movie Magazine in 1934
- Born: January 1, 1915
- Died: May 7, 1973 (aged 58)
- Occupation: Actress
- Years active: 1933-1973
- Spouse(s): William Witney (m.1938-1973; her death)

Maxine Doyle (January 1, 1915 – May 7, 1973) was an American film actress who appeared in almost 40 films between 1933 and 1946. Today's audiences may know Maxine Doyle from her appearance in the Leon Errol musical short Service with a Smile (1934), one of the first films in full Technicolor, which was restored and revived by Warner Bros.

== Early years ==
Doyle had a sister, Adalaide, who was an actress known professionally as Eve March.

== Career ==
By 1928, the 13-year-old Maxine Doyle was singing on radio station KYA in San Francisco, California. A contemporary newspaper article described her as "the sweetheart of KYA".

She was a featured player at Warner Bros., in such films as Babbitt (1934) with Aline MacMahon and Guy Kibbee, and 6 Day Bike Rider (1934) with Joe E. Brown.

She retired from the screen until 1943, when Witney needed an actress to play a minor role in his serial G-Men vs. the Black Dragon. Doyle played a nurse (and received high billing). This reactivated her career, and she continued to play incidental roles in Republic films for the next few years. Her last film was the serial Daughter of Don Q, released in 1946.

== Personal life and death ==
Doyle married William Witney, a film director, in Las Vegas, Nevada, on April 5, 1938. They eloped there after having planned to be married in Los Angeles the following weekend. Known privately as Maxine Doyle Witney, she died at age 58 from complications from cancer.

== Filmography ==
Year	Title	Role	Notes
1933	Footlight Parade	Chorus Girl	Uncredited
1934	Fashions of 1934	Chorus Girl	Uncredited
1934	She Made Her Bed	Flapper	Uncredited
1934	The Key	Pauline O'Connor	
1934	Service with a Smile	Girl in Auto	Short
1934	Good Morning, Eve!	Queen Gwinevere	Short
1934	Dames	Chorus Girl	Uncredited
1934	Kansas City Princess	Silent Outdoor Girl of America	Uncredited
1934	Student Tour	Ann Lippincott - Ethelred's Niece	
1934	6 Day Bike Rider	Phyllis Jenkins	
1934	Babbitt	Verona Babbitt	
1935	The Mystery Man	Anne Ogilvie	
1935	Born to Gamble	Cora Strickland	
1935	Condemned to Live	Marguerite Mane	
1936	It's Up to You	Mary Kane	
1936	Taming the Wild	June Bolton	
1936	Rio Grande Romance	Joan Williams	
1936	Fury Below		
1936	Lucky Fugitives	Aline McLain	
1936	Round-Up Time in Texas	Gwen Barkley	
1936	Put on the Spot	Joan Williams	(archive footage)
1937	Round-Up Time in Texas	Gwen Barkley	
1937	Come On, Cowboys	Ellen Reed	
1937	Thanks for Listening	Toots, Homer's Intended	
1937	S.O.S. Coast Guard	Jean Norman	
1943	G-Men vs. the Black Dragon	Marie	Serial, [Ch. 8]
1943	Shantytown	Secretary	Uncredited
1943	Chatterbox	Dude Ranch Guest	Uncredited
1943	Song of Texas	Cowgirl	Uncredited
1943	Overland Mail Robbery	Mrs. Bradley	Uncredited
1943	Mystery Broadcast	Telephone Operator	Uncredited
1943	Raiders of Sunset Pass	Sally Meehan	
1944	Beneath Western Skies	Mrs. Davis	Uncredited
1944	The Lady and the Monster	Receptionist	Uncredited
1944	Man from Frisco	Woman	Uncredited
1944	Sing, Neighbor, Sing	Maxine	
1944	San Fernando Valley	Cowgirl	Uncredited
1944	End of the Road	Florist	Uncredited
1944	Firebrands of Arizona	Newspaper Reporter	Uncredited
1946	Daughter of Don Q	Knockout Nellie	Serial, Uncredited, (final film role)
