= The Mystery Man (film) =

1935 film by Ray McCarey

- Directed by: Ray McCarey
- Written by: Tate Finn (story); William A. Johnston (adaptation); John W. Krafft (screenplay); Rollo Lloyd (screenplay)
- Produced by: Trem Carr (supervising producer); Paul Malvern (associate producer); George Yohalem (supervising producer)
- Starring: Robert Armstrong; Maxine Doyle
- Cinematography: Harry Neumann
- Edited by: Carl Pierson
- Distributed by: Monogram Pictures
- Release date: 1935
- Running time: 65 minutes
- Country: United States
- Language: English

The Mystery Man is a 1935 American mystery film directed by Ray McCarey and starring Robert Armstrong, Maxine Doyle and Henry Kolker.

== Plot summary ==
A Chicago newspaper man, Larry Doyle, finds himself in St. Louis after a night of drunken revelry. Low on money, he sees a young woman, Anne Olgivie, at a coffee counter. She hasn't got enough money to cover her bill, so he surreptitiously pays for her. Later, after sending a telegram to his boss asking for funds, Larry sees Anne again, trying to send a wire to her mother for money to come home. Unable to pay for the message, she leaves, and Larry recovers her note. Exiting to the street, he thinks he sees Anne throw herself in front of a car, so he grabs her, making it look as if she embraces him wildly. He admits to her that he is broke and that he knows she is, as well. They take a suite in a hotel, pretending to be on their honeymoon and try to raise some money. After being revealed to the hotel manager, Larry receives fifty dollars from his coworkers, which gives them some time. Larry attempts to get a job with a local paper because he has a line on the Eel, a local gangster. But his boss in Chicago denies his identity. Again out of money, Larry pawns a police revolver he was given as an award for solving a case in Chicago. Shortly thereafter, Larry and Anne witness a robbery by the Eel, where a cop is killed. Larry takes the place of the getaway driver and gets the loot before driving off. The next day, Larry describes the robbery to the police, while hiding his involvement. But when the gun used is found, it turns out to be Larry's. Once the police figure out Larry's part in the robbery, he is suspected of murder. When his boss in Chicago finally admits who he is to the police, he is given twenty-four hours to find the Eel. Returning with Anne to the pawn shop, which they have worked out is the meeting place, Larry confronts the pawn broker, reveals he knows of the broker's complicity and they fight. Having knocked out the broker, Larry pretends to be him when the Eel arrives. But the Eel isn't fooled and attempts to shoot him, but is shot by Anne, instead. When the story hits the papers, Larry is worried because they all refer to Anne as "Mrs. Doyle", meaning they'll have to get married, which is fine with them both.

== Cast ==
- Robert Armstrong as Larry Doyle
- Maxine Doyle as Anne Ogilvie
- Henry Kolker as Ellwyn A. "Jo-Jo" Jonas
- LeRoy Mason as The Eel, Gangster
- James Burke as Managing Editor Marvin
- Guy Usher as District Attorney Johnson
- James P. Burtis as Whalen
- Monte Collins as Dunn, Reporter
- Sam Lufkin as Weeks
- Otto Fries as Nate, Pawnbroker
- Norman Houston as T. Fulton Whistler
- Dell Henderson as Mr. Clark, Hotel Manager
- Lee Shumway as Plainclothes Man
- Sam Flint as Jerome Roberts, Publisher
