= The Silk Express =

- Theatrical release poster
- Directed by: Ray Enright
- Screenplay by: Houston Branch; Ben Markson
- Story by: Houston Branch
- Produced by: Henry Blanke
- Starring: Neil Hamilton; Sheila Terry; Arthur Byron; Guy Kibbee; Dudley Digges; Arthur Hohl
- Cinematography: Tony Gaudio
- Edited by: Ralph Dawson
- Music by: Bernhard Kaun
- Production company: Warner Bros. Pictures
- Distributed by: Warner Bros. Pictures
- Release date: June 10, 1933
- Running time: 61 minutes
- Country: United States
- Language: English

The Silk Express is a 1933 American pre-Code drama film directed by Ray Enright and written by Houston Branch and Ben Markson. The film, starring Neil Hamilton, Sheila Terry, Arthur Byron, Guy Kibbee, Dudley Digges and Arthur Hohl, was released by Warner Bros. Pictures on June 10, 1933.

== Plot ==
Donald Kilgore is determined to take a shipment of silk from Seattle to New York City by rail to break a monopoly set up by gangster Wallace Myton. Also aboard the train are Professor Axel Nyberg and his daughter Paula. He is paralyzed (except for the use of his eyes) and needs an operation in New York urgently to save his life. Myton has agents planted on the train to make sure the silk does not arrive in time.

When Kilgore's secretary is found murdered in a sealed railroad car, Detective McDuff sees a chance to finally make a name for himself and insists the train remain where it is until he solves the crime. Kilgore, however, has him knocked out, and the train proceeds at a record-setting pace. Then Clark, the conductor, is also killed. Professor Nyberg has seen something and knows who the killer is; he is finally able, by blinking once for "no" and twice for "yes", to let the others know. Before he can reveal the murderer's identity, the train enters a tunnel. In the darkness, the criminal tries to silence him, but Kilgore spots some movement in the unlit compartment and saves the professor's life. The killer and his accomplice draw their guns, but "tramp" Rusty Griffith turns out to be a Lloyd's of London undercover investigator and bluffs them into surrendering their weapons. The train arrives at its destination in time.

== Cast ==
- Neil Hamilton as Donald Kilgore
- Sheila Terry as Paula Nyberg
- Arthur Byron as Conductor Clark
- Guy Kibbee as Railway Detective McDuff
- Dudley Digges as Professor Axel Nyberg
- Arthur Hohl as Wallace Myton
- Allen Jenkins as Robert 'Rusty' Griffith
- Harold Huber as Train Guard Craft
- G. Pat Collins as Train Guard Harry Burns
- Robert Barrat as Mr. Calhoun, Attorney
- Vernon Steele as Dr. Harold Rolph
- Ivan Simpson as Johnson
- William H. Strauss as Merchant

== Reception ==
Mordaunt Hall of The New York Times praised Enright's direction, characterizing the film as "neatly measured and nicely balanced", as well as the cast's acting.
