= The Circus Clown =

1934 film by Ray Enright

- Directed by: Ray Enright
- Written by: Bert Kalmar; Harry Ruby; Paul Gerard Smith
- Produced by: First National Pictures
- Starring: Joe E. Brown; Patricia Ellis
- Cinematography: Sidney Hickox
- Edited by: Clarence Kolster
- Music by: Leo F. Forbstein
- Distributed by: Warner Bros. Pictures
- Release date: June 30, 1934
- Running time: 63 minutes
- Country: United States
- Language: English

The Circus Clown is a 1934 American Pre-Code comedy film about a man who wants to join the circus against the wishes of his ex-circus clown father, starring Joe E. Brown and Patricia Ellis. The movie was released by Warner Bros. Pictures on June 30, 1934.

== Plot ==
Young Happy Howard has been secretly practicing the skills of a circus clown like his father was. His father, however, has put the circus behind him and discourages him from joining the circus. When the circus comes to town, Happy runs away with it, taking menial jobs while hoping for a chance to perform. Happy becomes infatuated with Alice, a young aerialist, helping her take care of her nephew.

Alice arranges for a place in her aerial act for her alcoholic brother Frank who is recovering from the loss of his wife. On the day of the aerial act's first performance, Happy catches the brother drinking As he tries to stop him from drinking, the sister comes into the room and Happy pretends it is his liquor and drinks it all. Happy is discovered drunk by the circus owner and is fired. He is rejected by the girl and returns home to his father.

He reads in the newspaper that Alice is now a big star. He returns to the circus to try and win her back and explain. Happy arrives to find the brother is drinking and they fight. Happy knocks him out and has to take his place in the show. Happy is a big success to the delight of his father in the audience and is forgiven by Alice.

== Cast ==
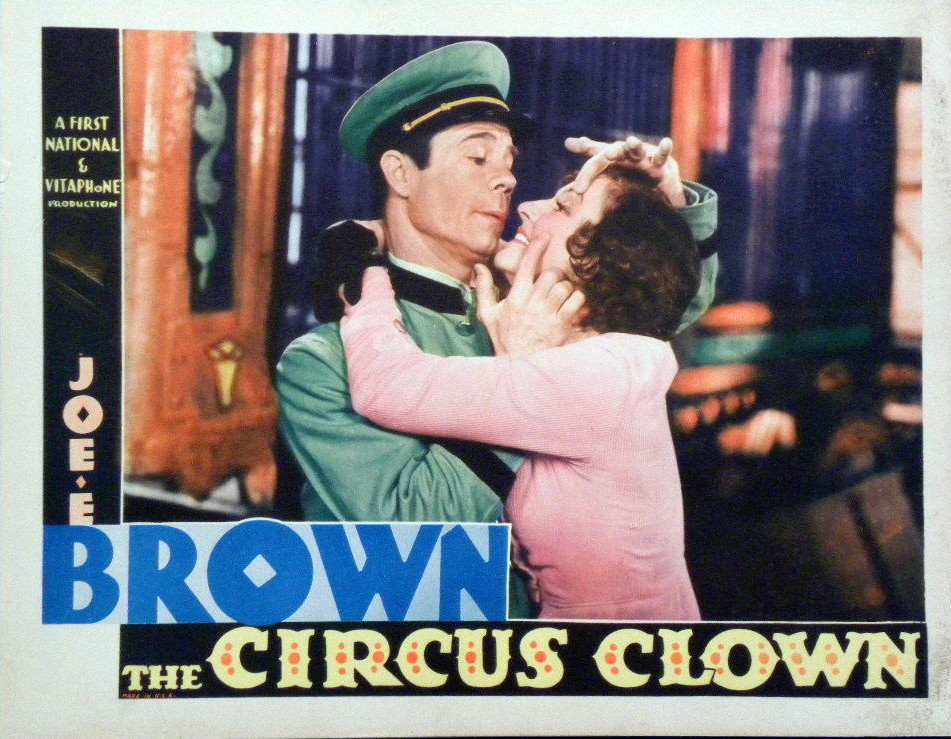
Lobby card

- Joe E. Brown as Happy Howard and H. "Chuckles" Howard (the father)
- Patricia Ellis as Alice
- Dorothy Burgess as Babe
- Don Dillaway as Jack
- Gordon Westcott as Frank
- Charles C. Wilson as Sheldon (as Charles Wilson)
- Harry Woods as Ajax
- John Sheehan as Moxley
- Spencer Charters as Kingsley
- Tom Dugan as Mac (scenes deleted)
- Earle Hodgins as Circus Barker
- Ward Bond as Unimpressed Man in Audience

== Production ==
Although not credited, Joe E. Brown also plays the role of his father throughout the film. Additionally, in two sequences employing the split screen technology process, Joe E. Brown appears as both his father, H. "Chuckles" Howard, and as Happy Howard. The first sequence is when both characters are sitting side by side, fishing. The second is when the two characters are sitting together at the circus. In both cases, the father character is on the left side of the screen.
