= State Trooper (film) =

1933 film

- Directed by: D. Ross Lederman
- Written by: Lambert Hillyer; Stuart Anthony
- Starring: Regis Toomey
- Cinematography: Benjamin H. Kline
- Distributed by: Columbia Pictures
- Release date: February 10, 1933
- Running time: 68 minutes
- Country: United States
- Language: English

State Trooper is a 1933 American pre-Code crime film directed by D. Ross Lederman and starring Regis Toomey.

== Cast ==
- Regis Toomey as Michael Rolph
- Evalyn Knapp as June Brady
- Barbara Weeks as Estelle
- Raymond Hatton as Carter
- Matthew Betz as Jarvis
- Edwin Maxwell as W.J. Brady
- Walter McGrail as Burman
- Lew Kelly as Graber
- Eddy Chandler as Morgan
