= Jail Bait (1937 film) =

1937 film

- Directed by: Charles Lamont
- Written by: Paul Gerard Smith
- Produced by: E. H. Allen; E. W. Hammons
- Starring: Buster Keaton
- Cinematography: Dwight Warren
- Production company: Educational Films
- Distributed by: 20th Century Fox
- Release date: January 8, 1937
- Running time: 18 minutes
- Country: United States
- Language: English

Jail Bait is a 1937 American short comedy film starring Buster Keaton.

== Plot ==
Following a kidnapping and murder, a reporter believes he knows the identity of the murderer, so he asks his roommate, a newspaper boy, to confess to the crime, in order to throw the police off the actual murderer's trail – giving the reporter time to catch the murderer and claim the reward for himself. The newspaper boy is at first reluctant, but then agrees with the condition that his half of the reward be large enough to purchase a ring he wants. Having gotten himself arrested, the newspaper boy learns that his roommate's plane has crashed, killing him and leaving the newspaper boy trapped in a death sentence for a crime he did not commit.

Following a prison break, the newspaper boy finds himself in the hideout of the man, Sawed-off Madison, responsible for the crimes he falsely confessed to. A shoot-out ensues, allowing both the actual murderer and the newspaper boy to escape. Back at the police station it is discovered that the newspaper boy did not commit the murder, and the police know it was Madison. At this time, the newspaper boy carries Sawed-off Madison into the station and claims the reward for his capture. The newspaper boy buys the ring he wanted.

== Cast ==
- Buster Keaton
- Harold Goodwin
- Bud Jamison
- Matthew Betz
- Betty André
- Stanley Blystone as Arresting officer (uncredited)
- Bobby Burns as Warden (uncredited)
- Allan Cavan as Desk Sergeant (uncredited)
- Harry Tenbrook as Prison guard (uncredited)
- Louise Keaton

== Production ==
Buster Keaton's three previous films for Educational Pictures were filmed in New York, and for this one they returned to their Hollywood studios. This meant Buster was working with his regular director Charles Lamont and producer E. H. Allen. Buster was also reunited with writer Paul Gerard Smith who had worked with him a decade prior in the 1926 film Battling Butler.

Filming took place in December 1936 and was "a model of economy" that had enough material to make a feature film.

Buster Keaton was paid $5000 for his role in the film.

== Copyright Status ==
The film's copyright was renewed in 1964, and the work will enter the US public domain in 2033.
