= Sheila Terry (actress) =

American actress (1910–1957)

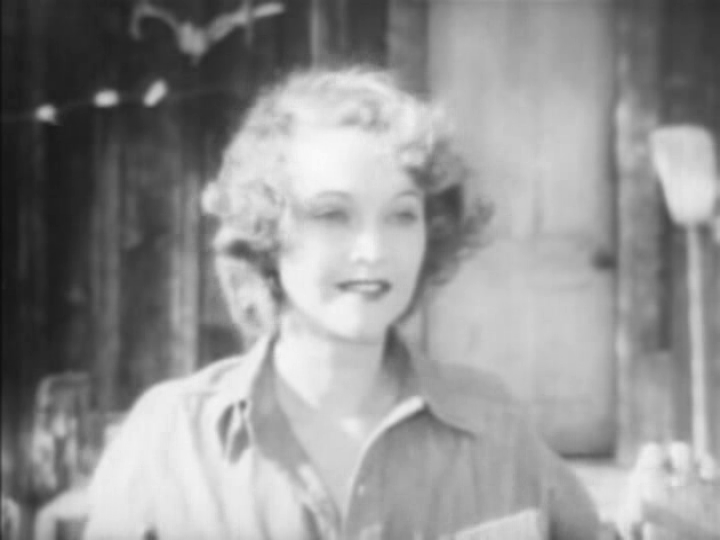
- Terry in The Lawless Frontier (1934)
- Born: Kathleen Eleanor Mulhern; March 5, 1910
- Died: c. January 19, 1957 (aged 46) (date body found); New York City, NY, U.S.
- Resting place: Hart Island, New York, U.S.
- Occupation: Actress
- Years active: 1932–1938
- Spouse(s): Laurence Erastus Clark (m.1928–div.1934); William Adam Magee Jr. (m.1936–div.1937)

Sheila Terry (born Kathleen Eleanor Mulhern; March 5, 1910 – c. January 1957) was an American film actress.

== Early years ==
Although she wanted to be an actress, young "Kay" Mulhern studied to be a teacher in accordance with the desires of a rich uncle. After training as an educator from 1927 to 1929, she taught in a country school to meet the requirement for receiving her inheritance from that uncle. The inheritance was in stocks, however, and its value vanished in the 1929 crash of the stock market.

== Career ==
She first studied dramatics at Dickson-Kenwin academy, a Toronto school affiliated with London's Royal Academy. For approximately seven months, she acted in stock theater in Toronto. Later she moved to New York, where she continued her studies and appeared in a number of plays. A film scout saw her on Broadway in The Little Racketeer and offered her a test that resulted in a contract with Warner Bros.

She appeared in such films as You Said a Mouthful, Scarlet Dawn, and Madame Butterfly (all 1932). She appeared with John Wayne in the Western films as Haunted Gold (1932), 'Neath the Arizona Skies (1934), and The Lawless Frontier (1934). In 1933, she left Hollywood briefly for the New York stage.

== Personal life ==
She married Major Laurence Clark, a wealthy Toronto socialite, on August 16, 1928. They separated on August 15, 1930, and she divorced him on February 15, 1934. In 1937, she married William Magee of San Francisco, and retired from show business. After his death, Terry wanted to return to show business, but couldn't find a job.

== Death ==
In January 1957, her body was discovered in her third floor apartment, which was both her home and office. A friend and neighbor, Jerry Keating, went to her apartment after he failed to reach her on the telephone. The door was locked, and Terry did not answer the bell. Keating called the police, who broke in and found Terry's body on the bedroom floor, her back leaning against the bed, with five empty capsules on the floor beside her. Friends told the police that she had returned from a trip to Mexico some time before her death and that she was ill when she came home. It was later discovered that she died broke, leaving only a scant wardrobe. She was 46 years old. She was buried on Hart Island, New York.

== Partial filmography ==
- Week-End Marriage (1932) - Connie
- Jewel Robbery (1932) - Blonde Decoy (uncredited)
- Crooner (1932) - Hat Check Girl (uncredited)
- Two Against the World (1932) - Miss Edwards - Norton's Secretary (uncredited)
- Big City Blues (1932) - Lorna St. Clair (uncredited)
- A Scarlet Week-End (1932) - Marjorie Murphy
- They Call It Sin (1932) - Telephone Operator (uncredited)
- Three on a Match (1932) - Naomi (uncredited)
- Scarlet Dawn (1932) - Marjorie
- I Am a Fugitive from a Chain Gang (1932) - Allen's Secretary (uncredited)
- You Said a Mouthful (1932) - Cora Norton
- Lawyer Man (1932) - Flo - Gilmurry's Moll (uncredited)
- Haunted Gold (1932) - Janet Carter
- Madame Butterfly (1932) - Mrs. Pinkerton
- 20,000 Years in Sing Sing (1932) - "Babe" Saunders - Bud's Wife (uncredited)
- The Match King (1932) - Blonde Telephone Operator (uncredited)
- Parachute Jumper (1933) - Weber's Secretary (uncredited)
- The Sphinx (1933) - Jerry Crane
- The Silk Express (1933) - Paula Nyberg
- Private Detective 62 (1933) - Mrs. Wright (uncredited)
- The Mayor of Hell (1933) - Blonde with Mike
- Son of a Sailor (1933) - Genevieve
- The House on 56th Street (1933) - Dolly
- Convention City (1933) - Mrs. Kent
- Take the Stand (1934) - Mrs. Pearl Reynolds
- Rocky Rhodes (1934) - Nan Street
- When Strangers Meet (1934) - Dolly
- The Lawless Frontier (1934) - Ruby
- 'Neath the Arizona Skies (1934) - Clara Moore
- Rescue Squad (1935) - Rose
- Social Error (1935) - Sonia
- Society Fever (1935) - Lucy Prouty
- Bars of Hate (1935) - Ann Dawson
- A Scream in the Night (1935) - Edith Bentley
- Murder on a Bridle Path (1936) - Violet Feverel
- Special Investigator (1936) - Judy Taylor
- Go-Get-'Em, Haines (1936) - Jane Kent
- Fury Below (1936) - Claire Johnson
- A Girl's Best Years (1936, Short) - Phyllis Rodgers
- Hit the Saddle (1937) - Rita's Cantina Friend (uncredited)
- Sky Racket (1937) - Wedding Guest (uncredited)
- I Demand Payment (1938) - Rita Avery

== Sources ==
- "Sheila Terry divorces hubby". Border Cities Star. February 16, 1934.
- "Sheila Terry turns unwanted role into personal triumph". The Milwaukee Sentinel. April 11, 1936.
- "Tower Ticket". Chicago Daily Tribune. December 27, 1948.
- "Sheila Terry, Starlet and playgirl of the 1920s, dies". Los Angeles Times. January 20, 1957.
