= Paul Gerard Smith =

American screenwriter (1894–1968)

- Born: September 14, 1894; Omaha, Nebraska, US
- Died: 4 April 1968 (aged 73); San Diego, California, US
- Occupation: Screenwriter
- Years active: 1926–1955
- Spouse: Mary Alice Lundgren
- Children: 4

Paul Gerard Smith (September 14, 1894 – April 4, 1968) was an American screenwriter. He wrote for 90 films between 1926 and 1955.

== Biography ==
Born in 1894, Smith started writing musical revues at the age of ten. He joined the Marines for World War I and while still in Germany wrote and directed the Sixth Marine Revue in the Rhine Occupation Area. He arrived back in the States in 1919 and started writing vaudeville acts. He became so successful that he was one of the few writers to be credited on the playbill. He scripted the Ziegfeld Follies of 1924, 1925, and 1926 and was also one of the writers of Funny Face.

Smith was brought to Hollywood by Buster Keaton to work on The General and Battling Butler. Early film credits include In Old Arizona, Mother Knows Best, and Dressed to Kill, as well as the first talkies of Harold Lloyd, Welcome Danger and Feet First. He wrote dozens of B movies for Universal Studios, Fox Film Corporation, Paramount Pictures, RKO Radio Pictures, Warner Bros., and Hal Roach Studios.

He also scripted USO shows and personal appearances for many film and radio stars entertaining overseas. After World War II he returned to film and radio scripting and also wrote and directed some early television programs on ABC, including The Gay Nineties Revue. He returned to stage writing with Hullabaloo for the Pasadena Playhouse.

Smith was married to Mary Alice Lundgren (October 1919 - April 1968) and had four children. His son, Paul Gerard Smith II, carried on the family tradition, working in the entertainment industry after serving in the Marines during World War II.

He was born in Omaha, Nebraska, and died in San Diego, California.

== Partial filmography ==
- The General (1927)
- Speedy (1928)
- Son of a Sailor (1933)
- The Circus Clown (1934)
- Ladies in Love (1936)
- Ditto (1937)
- Jail Bait (1937)
- Just Around the Corner (1938)
- The Boys from Syracuse (1940)
- Tengo fe en ti (1940)
- Hello, Sucker (1941)
- Wild Bill Hickok Rides (1942)
- Heavenly Music (1943)
- Thumbs Up (1943)
- Sunbonnet Sue (1945)
