= Haunted Gold =

1932 film

- Film poster
- Directed by: Mack V. Wright
- Written by: Adele Buffington
- Produced by: Leon Schlesinger
- Starring: John Wayne; Sheila Terry; Erville Alderson; Harry Woods; Otto Hoffman; Martha Mattox; Blue Washington
- Cinematography: Nicholas Musuraca
- Edited by: William Clemens
- Music by: John Peasano
- Production company: Leon Schlesinger Productions
- Distributed by: Warner Bros. Pictures
- Release date: December 17, 1932
- Running time: 58 minutes
- Country: United States
- Language: English

Haunted Gold is a 1932 American pre-Code Western film directed by Mack V. Wright and starring John Wayne. The picture was released by Warner Bros. Pictures. It is a remake of the 1928 film The Phantom City, starring Ken Maynard and his horse Tarzan. Filmed in 1932, two years before the implementation of Hollywood's Production Code, the film contains several racial slurs involving the black character "Clarence Brown" (played by Blue Washington). It was one in numerous live-action films to be produced by Leon Schlesinger Productions, which is better known for its animated short film series Looney Tunes and Merrie Melodies. The film featured an animated intro sequence by courtesy of Harman-Ising Productions, which produced both series for Leon Schlesinger and Warner Bros. Pictures.

== Plot ==
John Mason and Janet Carter receive an anonymous letter telling them to travel to a ghost town that has an abandoned mine. There they befriend each other as they try to find out why they were sent the letters. They soon find themselves targets of Joe Ryan and his gang who are looking for the hidden gold inside the abandoned mine. They are helped by the mysterious Phantom of the mine who has his own plans.

== Cast ==
- John Wayne as John Mason
- Sheila Terry as Janet Carter
- Harry Woods as Joe Ryan
- Erville Alderson as Tom Benedict
- Otto Hoffman as Simon - Benedict's Servant
- Martha Mattox as Mrs. Herman
- Blue Washington as Clarence Washington Brown
- John T. Prince as Bill Carter

== See also ==
- John Wayne filmography
