= Fireman, Save My Child (1932 film) =

1932 film

- Directed by: Lloyd Bacon
- Written by: Ray Enright; Robert Lord; Arthur Caesar
- Starring: Joe E. Brown; Evalyn Knapp; Lilian Bond; Guy Kibbee
- Cinematography: Sol Polito
- Edited by: George Marks
- Production company: First National Pictures
- Distributed by: Warner Bros. Pictures
- Release date: February 20, 1932 (USA)
- Running time: 67 minutes
- Country: United States
- Language: English
- Budget: $214,000
- Box office: $604,000

Fireman, Save My Child is a 1932 American pre-Code comedy film starring comedian Joe E. Brown and directed by Lloyd Bacon. The picture was produced by the First National Pictures and released by their parent Warner Bros. Pictures. The supporting cast features Evalyn Knapp, Lilian Bond and Guy Kibbee.

The film was remade in 1954.

== Cast ==
- Joe E. Brown - Smokey Joe Grant
- Evalyn Knapp - Sally Toby
- Lilian Bond - June Farnum
- Guy Kibbee - Pop Devlin
- Richard Carle - Dan Toby
- George MacFarlane - St. Louis Fire Chief
- Frank Shellenback - Pitcher
- Virginia Sale - Miss Gallop
- Curtis Benton - Radio Announcer
- George Meeker - Stevens
- George Ernest - Mascot for St. Louis Team
- Ben Hendricks Jr. - Larkin
- Walter Walker - Mr. Platt
- Dickie Moore - Herbie, Mascot's Pal
- Junior Coghlan - Mascot's Pal

== Box Office ==
According to Warner Bros records, the film earned $505,000 domestically and $99,000 domestically.

== Preservation status ==
The film is preserved in the Library of Congress collection. It is available on Region 1 DVD via Warner Archive and occasionally airs on Turner Classic Movies.

== See also ==
- List of baseball films
