= Elmer, the Great =

1933 film

- Theatrical release poster
- Directed by: Mervyn LeRoy
- Screenplay by: Thomas J. Geraghty
- Based on: Elmer the Great; 1928 play by Ring Lardner; George M. Cohan
- Produced by: Raymond Griffith
- Starring: Joe E. Brown; Patricia Ellis
- Cinematography: Arthur L. Todd
- Edited by: Thomas Pratt
- Music by: Leo F. Forbstein
- Distributed by: First National Pictures
- Release date: April 29, 1933
- Running time: 72 minutes
- Country: United States
- Language: English
- Budget: $200,000

Elmer, the Great is a 1933 American pre-Code comedy film directed by Mervyn LeRoy, starring Joe E. Brown and Patricia Ellis.

== Plot ==
Elmer Kane is a rookie ballplayer with the Chicago Cubs whose ego is matched only by his appetite. Because he is not only vain but naïve, Elmer's teammates take great delight in pulling practical jokes on him. Still, he is so valuable a player that the Cubs management hides the letters from his hometown sweetheart Nellie, so that Elmer won't bolt the team and head for home. When Nellie comes to visit Elmer, she finds him in an innocent but compromising situation with a glamorous actress. She turns her back on him, and disconsolate Elmer tries to forget his troubles at a crooked gambling house. Elmer incurs an enormous gambling debt, which the casino's owner is willing to forget if Elmer will only throw the deciding World Series game (which he refers to as the World Serious).

Elmer brawls with the gambler and lands in jail, where he learns of a particularly cruel practical joke that had previously been played on him. Out of spite, he refuses to play in the Big Game, and thanks to a jailhouse visit by the gamblers, it looks as though Elmer has taken a bribe, but when he shows up to play (after patching things up with Nellie), Elmer proves that he's been true-blue all along. Based on the 1928 Broadway play by Ring Lardner and George M. Cohan, Elmer, the Great betrays its stage origins in its static early scenes, before building to a climax during a rain-soaked ball game.

== Cast ==
- Joe E. Brown as Elmer Kane
- Patricia Ellis as Nellie Poole
- Frank McHugh as Healy High-Hips
- Claire Dodd as Evelyn Corey
- Preston Foster as Dave Walker (as Preston S. Foster)
- Russell Hopton as Whitey
- Sterling Holloway as Nick Kane (as Sterling Halloway)
- Emma Dunn as Mrs. Kane
- Charles C. Wilson as Mr. Wade (as Charles Wilson)
- Charles Delaney as Johnny Abbott
- Berton Churchill as Colonel Moffitt
- J. Carrol Naish as Jerry (as J. Carroll Naish)
- Gene Morgan as Noonan
- George Chandler as Cubs Player

== See also ==
- List of baseball films
