= Joe E. Brown =

American actor (1891–1973)

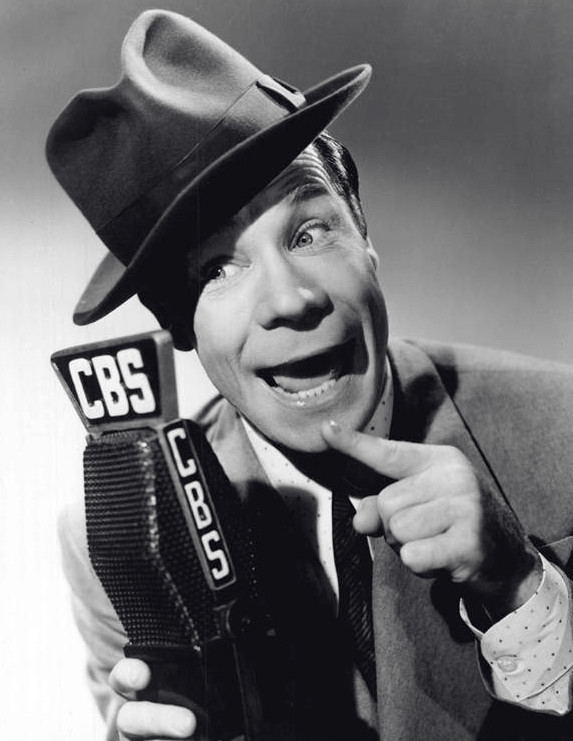
- Brown in 1945
- Born: Joseph Evans Brown; July 28, 1891; Holgate, Ohio, U.S.
- Died: July 6, 1973 (aged 81); Brentwood, California, U.S.
- Occupations: Actor; comedian
- Years active: 1928–1964
- Spouse: Kathryn Francis McGraw (m. 1915)
- Children: 4, including Joe L. Brown

Joe E. Brown (born Joseph Evans Brown, July 28, 1891 – July 6, 1973) was an American actor and comedian, remembered for his friendly screen persona, comic timing, and enormous, elastic-mouthed smile. He was one of the most popular American comedians in the 1930s and 1940s, and enjoyed lengthy careers in both motion pictures and radio. Later he became a character actor and comedian, as in Some Like It Hot (1959), in which he utters the film's famous punchline "Well, nobody's perfect."

== Early life ==
Brown was born on July 28, 1891 in Holgate, Ohio, near Toledo, into a large family of Welsh descent. He spent most of his childhood in Toledo. In 1902, at the age of ten, he joined a troupe of circus tumblers known as the Five Marvelous Ashtons, who toured the country on both the circus and vaudeville circuits. Later, he became a professional baseball player. Despite his skill, he declined an opportunity to sign with the New York Yankees to pursue his career as an entertainer. After three seasons, he returned to the circus, then went into vaudeville and finally starred on Broadway. He gradually added comedy to his act, and transformed himself into a comedian. He moved to Broadway in the 1920s, first appearing in the musical comedy Jim Jam Jems.

== Motion pictures ==
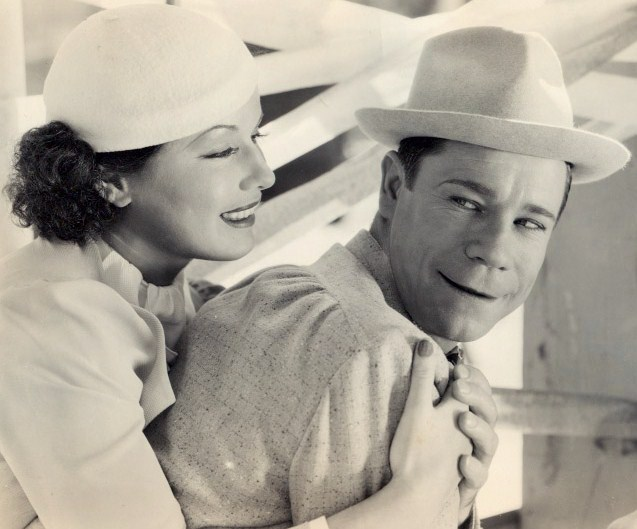
With June Travis in Earthworm Tractors (1936)

Joe E. Brown was one of the first stage stars to work in then-new talking pictures. In 1927 he made a Vitaphone short, Twinkle, Twinkle. This did not lead to more talking-picture work immediately, although he did make silent and sound features through 1929 for various companies. They weren't always comedies: his 1929 feature for Tiffany, Painted Faces, was a courtroom drama with Brown (speaking in a German dialect) as a vaudeville clown who is the lone holdout among 11 other jurors pressing for a guilty verdict.

=== Warner Bros. ===
Warner Bros. offered him a seven-year contract, and he quickly became a favorite with family audiences, and shot to stardom after appearing in the first all-color, all-talking musical comedy On with the Show! (1929). He starred in a number of lavish Technicolor musical comedies, including Sally (1929), Hold Everything (1930), Song of the West (1930), and Going Wild (1930). By 1931, Brown's name was billed above the title in the films in which he appeared.

Some of the Brown screenplays incorporated his fondness for baseball. In Fireman, Save My Child (1932), he played a member of the St. Louis Cardinals, and in both Elmer, the Great (1933) with Patricia Ellis and Claire Dodd and Alibi Ike (1935) with Olivia de Havilland, he portrayed ballplayers with the Chicago Cubs.

In 1933 he starred in Son of a Sailor with Jean Muir and Thelma Todd. In 1934, he displayed his dramatic abilities in the Damon Runyon story A Very Honorable Guy. He went on to make The Circus Clown (again with Patricia Ellis) and 6 Day Bike Rider with Maxine Doyle.

Brown was one of the few vaudeville comedians to appear in a Shakespearean film; he played Francis Flute in the Max Reinhardt/William Dieterle film version of Shakespeare's A Midsummer Night's Dream (1935) and was highly praised for his performance.

In 1933 and 1936, he was named one of the top 10 moneymakers in films, and in 1936 he was one of the top 50 moneymakers in Great Britain.

In the mid-1930s Joe E. Brown's films had become established moneymakers, and the studio began to economize on their production. By this time the Brown comedies were merely "program pictures"—something to fill out a moviehouse program—instead of the major-motion-picture status they formerly enjoyed. Brown's high-salary contract had become too expensive for Warner Bros. to sustain. The writing was already on the wall in mid-1936, when a magazine reported that "Joe E. Brown is making his next-to-last picture for Warner Brothers. This one is called Earthworm Tractors." The next and last Brown feature for Warner was Polo Joe (1936). By November trade publisher Pete Harrison cautioned exhibitors that "Joe E. Brown [is] not in the employ of this company for the 1936-37 season."

=== Free agency ===
Brown had already prepared for his imminent departure. In April 1936 he had signed with independent producer David L. Loew for a series of comedies. This was front-page news in the trade: "Brown goes over to Loew about August, or perhaps slightly later this year. The producing alliance between Loew and the comic runs for a period of two years and calls for the production of three features a year. Distribution through RKO is assumed to preclude a deal now in negotiation", Motion Picture Daily observed, "and was seen as merely one in a series of outside deals to come." That's exactly what happened: the six Loew-Brown features were ultimately handled in turn by three different studios: RKO, Columbia, and MGM.

Joe E. Brown left Loew in 1938 when his two-year contract lapsed. While his brand of broad comedy was still popular, it was somewhat old-fashioned, much like the slapstick efforts of Laurel and Hardy. As a result, Brown was now being handed "B" pictures for Paramount (one film), Columbia (three films), and finally Republic (four films). The Republics were his last starring vehicles. From this point on, Brown continued in films but in guest appearances and character roles.

== Radio ==
Beginning in 1938 Brown had a comedy-variety radio show, The Joe E. Brown Show, on the CBS network. The September 21, 1939 episode was captured in the 1939 WJSV broadcast day recordings. In 1944, on the Blue Network (soon to become ABC Radio), he hosted Stop Or Go, a radio quiz show aimed at servicemen.

== World War II ==
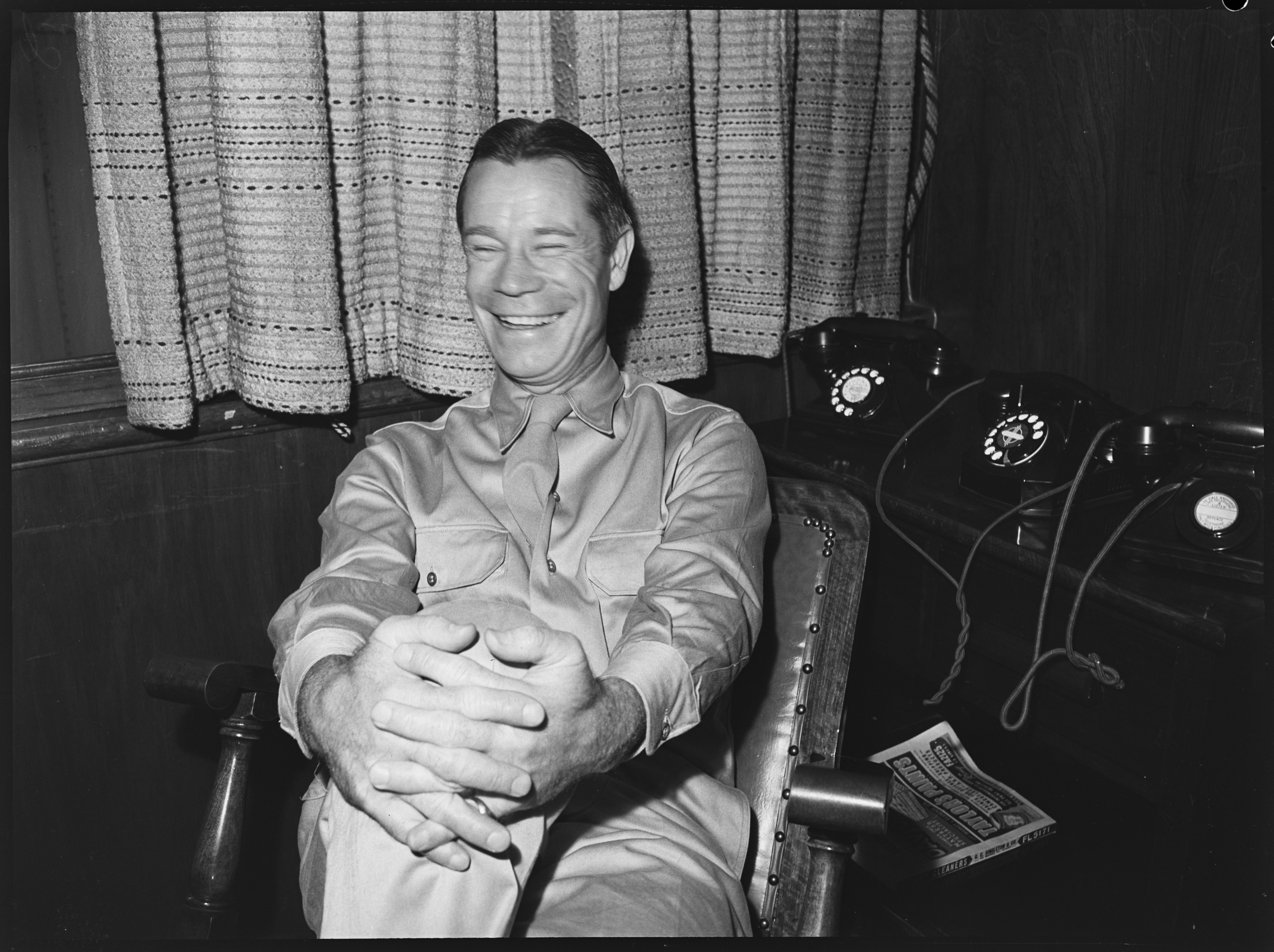
Joe E Brown supporting the troops, Sydney, Australia, 1943

In 1939, Brown testified before the House Immigration Committee in support of a bill that would allow 20,000 German-Jewish refugee children into the U.S. He later adopted two refugee children.

At age 50 when the U.S. entered World War II, Brown was too old to enlist. Both of his biological sons served in the military during the war. In 1942, Captain Don E. Brown was killed when his Douglas A-20 Havoc crashed near Palm Springs, California.

Even before the USO was organized, Brown spent a great deal of time traveling, at his own expense, to entertain troops in the South Pacific, including Guadalcanal, New Zealand, and Australia, as well as the Caribbean and Alaska. He was the first to tour in this way, before Bob Hope made similar journeys. Brown also spent many nights working and meeting servicemen at the Hollywood Canteen. He wrote of his experiences entertaining the troops in his book Your Kids and Mine. On his return to the U.S., Brown brought sacks of letters, making sure they were delivered by the Post Office. He gave shows in all weather conditions, many in hospitals, sometimes doing his entire show for a single dying soldier. He signed autographs for everyone. For his services to morale, Brown became one of only two civilians to be awarded the Bronze Star during World War II (the other was author Ernest Hemingway).

== Postwar work ==
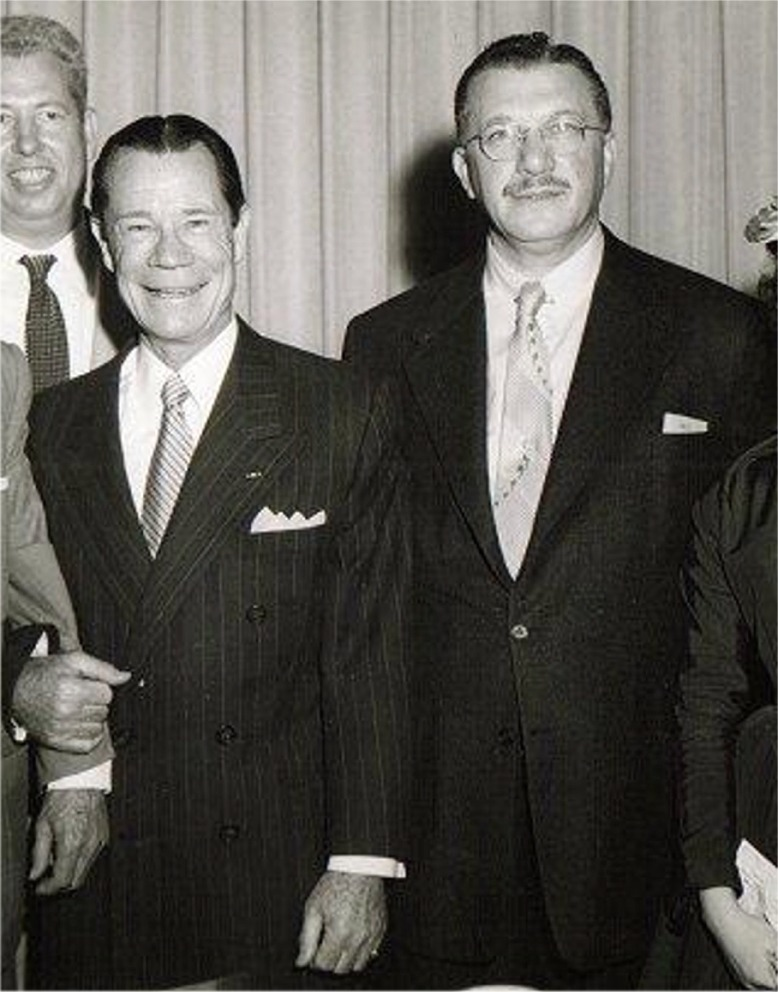
Brown and Irving Leroy Ress (right) c. 1950

His concern for the troops continued into the Korean War, as evidenced by a newsreel featuring his appeal for blood donations to aid the U.S. and UN troops there that was featured in the season 4 episode of M*A*S*H titled "Deluge".

Brown became known for touring in the role of Elwood P. Dowd, the lead in Mary Chase's Harvey:

The comic said that sometime during the run of Harvey at Elitch, he’ll have invoked the character of the lovable Elwood for the 2,000th time. This means that he’ll have played the part more than any other living person as well as performed it in more countries than anyone. “I’ve performed it in Australia, Canada, England, and Hawaii,” said Brown. “I took over the part in the New York company when Frank Fay, the originator, gave it up, and played it seven months before it went on the road.

In 1948, he was awarded a Special Tony Award for his work in the touring company of Harvey. In 1951 he starred as the main character, the widower Samuel Rilling, in the William Roos, Jack Lawrence, and Don Walker Broadway musical Courtin' Time.

He had a cameo in Around the World in 80 Days (1956), as the Fort Kearney stationmaster talking to Fogg (David Niven) and his entourage in a small town in Nebraska. In the similarly epic film It's a Mad, Mad, Mad, Mad World (1963), he had a cameo as a union official giving a speech at a construction site in the climactic scene.

His best known postwar role was that of aging millionaire Osgood Fielding III in Billy Wilder's 1959 comedy Some Like It Hot. Fielding falls for Daphne (Jerry), played by Jack Lemmon in drag; at the end of the film, Lemmon takes off his wig and reveals to Brown that he is a man, to which Brown responds "Well, nobody's perfect," one of the more celebrated punchlines in film.

Another of his notable postwar roles was that of Cap'n Andy Hawks in MGM's 1951 remake of Show Boat, a role that he reprised onstage in the 1961 New York City Center revival of the musical and on tour. Brown performed several dance routines in the film, and famed choreographer Gower Champion appeared along with first wife Marge. Brown's final film appearance was in The Comedy of Terrors (1964).

== Television ==
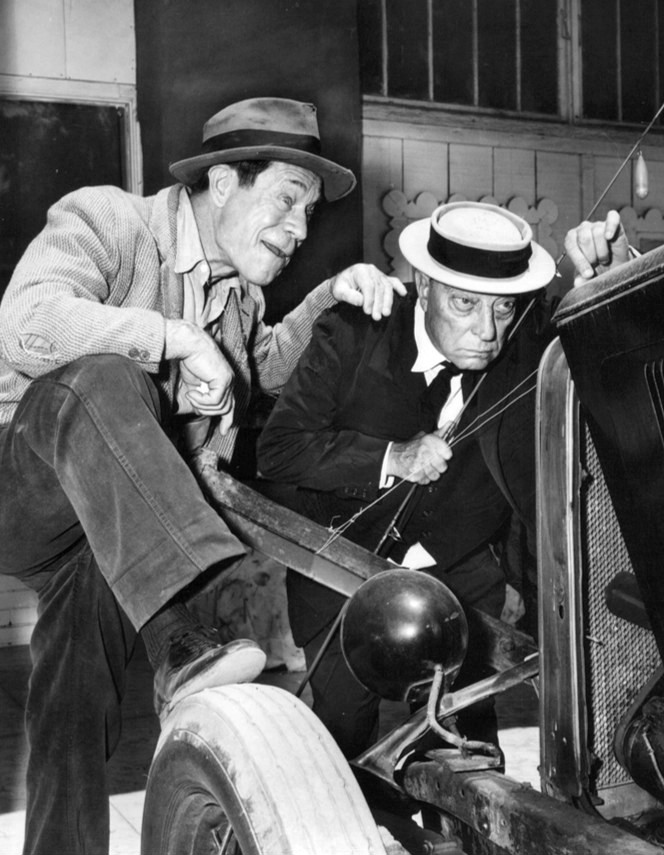
Brown with Buster Keaton in the "Journey to Nineveh" episode of Route 66 (1962)

Unlike other screen veterans, Joe E. Brown did not attempt to extend his career by starring in his own television series. Instead, he limited his television work to guest-star roles, sometimes appearing as himself on panel shows. He was the celebrity guest on The Name's the Same (December 23, 1952 and July 19, 1955) and the mystery guest on What's My Line? (January 11, 1953). In 1954, Brown appeared in Milestones of Motoring, a made-for-television industrial musical produced by Cinécraft Productions, with Merv Griffin and Rita Farrell. In 1955 Brown appeared in an episode of Screen Directors Playhouse, "The Silent Partner", with Brown as a pioneer movie director recalling his silent-movie days working with slapstick comic Kelsey Dutton (Buster Keaton). Today's viewers may know Joe E. Brown from his 1962 appearance on Route 66. In this episode, "Journey to Nineveh", he and Buster Keaton played two brothers reminiscent of Brown's and Keaton's screen personalities -- one optimistic and one stoic.

== Other interests ==
=== Baseball ===
Joe E. Brown was a devoted baseball fan, and some sportswriters who had seen him when he was a semi-pro player still believed he could have become a successful major-league player one day. He has a place in Boston's sports history: on April 14, 1925, radio station WBZ (AM) broadcast a local Major League baseball game for the first time. The Boston Braves played against the New York Giants, a game that the Braves won 5–4. The radio announcer calling the game was Joe E. Brown.

In April 1925, he was in the Boston area, starring in a stage performance of "Betty Lee" at Boston's Majestic Theater. Brown knew several of the Boston sportswriters, especially sports cartoonist Abe Savrann ("SAV") of the Boston Traveler. Brown was a member of the Benevolent and Protective Order of Elks, and so was Savrann, who brought him in as a guest speaker at the mid-April 1925 meeting of the Cambridge, Massachusetts Elks Lodge. Savrann noted in his Traveler cartoon on April 15, 1925 (p. 20) that Brown had been the game announcer that day. The radio critic for the New Britain Daily Herald (in Connecticut) wrote, "It is too bad that Joe E. Brown, who announced the game yesterday, could not fill that place during the entire season," noting that Brown not only described the game well but also offered amusing and interesting anecdotes in the process.

While there is no information that he did any further radio play-by-play announcing, he did return to the broadcast booth in television, in 1953. He served as a commentator for the New York Yankees games on WPIX-TV, replacing Joe DiMaggio. His TV duties included a 15-minute pre-game show and a 10-minute post-game show throughout the season. At the end of the season, he was replaced by Red Barber.

Brown befriended many ballplayers over the years. He spent Ty Cobb's last days with him, discussing Cobb's life and times.

Brown's son Joe L. Brown shared his father's love of baseball, serving as general manager of the Pittsburgh Pirates from 1955 to 1976, and briefly in 1985, also building the 1960 and 1971 World Series champions. Joe L. Brown's '71 Pirates featured baseball's first starting lineup consisting of only Black and Latino players.

Joe E. Brown's enthusiasm for baseball also led to his becoming the first president of PONY Baseball and Softball (at the time named Pony League) when the organization was incorporated in 1953. He continued in the post until late 1964, when he retired. Later he traveled additional thousands of miles telling the story of PONY League, hoping to interest adults in organizing baseball programs for young people.

=== Horse racing ===
He was a fan of thoroughbred horse racing, a regular at the racetracks in Del Mar and Santa Anita.

=== Aviation ===
Brown was also an aviation enthusiast. Zack Mosley, creator of the comic strip The Adventures of Smilin' Jack, tributed Brown with the fictional lookalike character Flannelmouth Don; an air show announcer who did not need a microphone to be heard over the roar of multiple plane engines. The character appeared in the strip from the mid-1940s until the mid 1950s.

== In popular culture ==
Brown was caricatured in the Disney cartoons Mickey's Gala Premiere (1933), Mother Goose Goes Hollywood (1938), and The Autograph Hound (1939); all contain a scene in which he is seen laughing so loud that his mouth opens extremely wide. Daws Butler used Joe E. Brown as inspiration for the voices of two Hanna-Barbera cartoon characters: Lippy the Lion (1962) and Peter Potamus (1963–1966).

He also starred in his own comic strip in the British comic Film Fun for a 20-year run, beginning in 1933.

== Later life and family ==
Brown married Kathryn Francis McGraw in 1915. The marriage lasted until his death in 1973. The couple had four children: two sons, Don Evan Brown (December 25, 1916 – October 8, 1942; captain in the United States Army Air Force, who was killed in the crash of an A-20B Havoc bomber while serving as a ferry pilot) and Joe LeRoy "Joe L." Brown (September 1, 1918 – August 15, 2010), and two daughters, Mary Katherine Ann (b. 1930) and Kathryn Francis (b. 1934). Both daughters were adopted as infants.

Brown was a Freemason. He became a member of Rubicon Lodge in Toledo in 1915.

In November 1961, a brush fire destroyed his home, including all the memorabilia from his career.

== Death and legacy ==
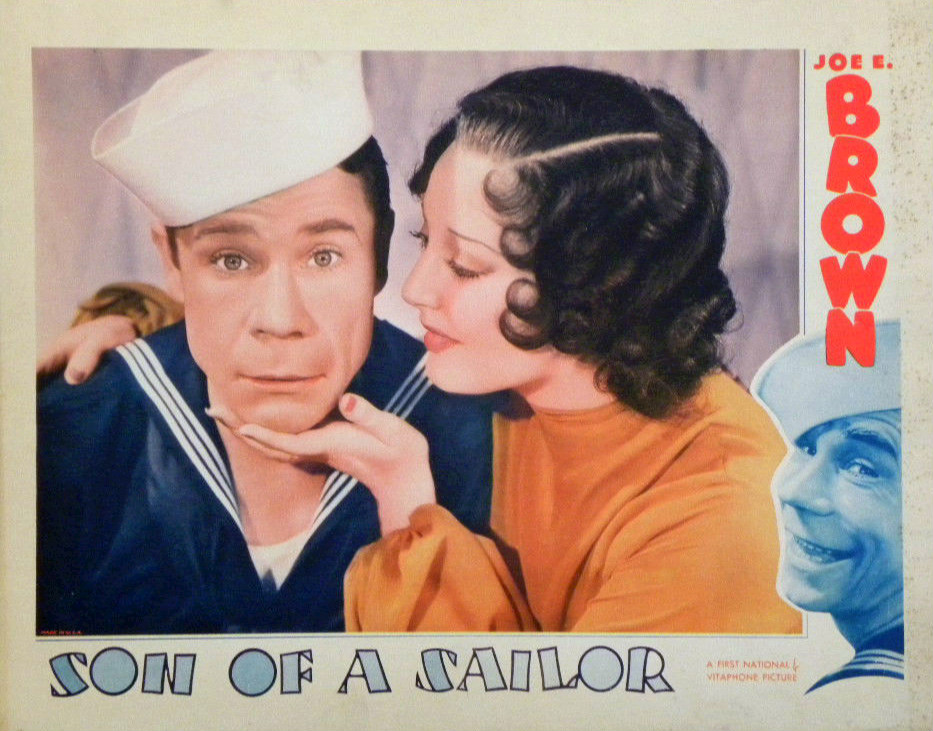
Lobby card for Son of a Sailor (1933)

Brown began having heart problems in 1968 after suffering a severe heart attack, and underwent cardiac surgery. He died from complications from arteriosclerosis on July 6, 1973 at his home in Brentwood, California. He is interred at Forest Lawn Memorial Park in Glendale, California.

For his contributions to the film industry, Brown was inducted into the Hollywood Walk of Fame in 1960 with a motion pictures star located at 1680 Vine Street.

In 1961, Bowling Green State University renamed the theatre in which Brown appeared in Harvey in the 1950s as the Joe E. Brown Theatre. It closed in 2011.

Holgate, Ohio, his birthplace, has a street named Joe E. Brown Avenue. Toledo, Ohio, has a city park named Joe E. Brown Park at 150 West Oakland Street.

Rose Naftalin's popular 1975 cookbook includes a cookie named the Joe E. Brown. Brown was a frequent customer of Naftalin's Toledo restaurant.

== Selected filmography ==
- Crooks Can't Win (1928) as Jimmy Wells
- Hit of the Show (1928) as Twisty
- The Circus Kid (1928) as King Kruger
- Take Me Home (1928) as Bunny
- Molly and Me (1929) as Jim Wilson
- My Lady's Past (1929) as Sam Young
- On with the Show! (1929) as Joe Beaton
- Painted Faces (1929) as Hermann / Beppo
- Sally (1929) as Grand Duke Constantine of Czechoslovenia
- Song of the West (1930) as Hasty
- Hold Everything (1930) as Gink Schiner
- Top Speed (1930) as Elmer Peters
- Maybe It's Love (1930) as Yates
- The Lottery Bride (1930) as Hoke
- Going Wild (1930) as Rollo Smith
- Sit Tight (1931) as Jojo
- Broadminded (1931) as Ossie Simpson
- Local Boy Makes Good (1931) as John Augustus Miller
- Fireman, Save My Child (1932) as Joe Grant
- The Tenderfoot (1932) as Calvin Jones
- You Said a Mouthful (1932) as Joe Holt
- Elmer, the Great (1933) as Elmer
- Son of a Sailor (1933) as 'Handsome' Callahan
- A Very Honorable Guy (1934) as 'Feet' Samuels
- The Circus Clown (1934) as Happy Howard
- 6 Day Bike Rider (1934) as Wilfred Simpson
- Alibi Ike (1935) as Frank X. Farrell
- Bright Lights (1935) as Joe Wilson
- A Midsummer Night's Dream (1935) as Flute, the Bellows-Mender
- Sons o' Guns (1936) as Jimmy Canfield
- Earthworm Tractors (1936) as Alexander Botts
- Polo Joe (1936) as Joe Bolton
- When's Your Birthday? (1937) as Dustin Willoughby
- Riding on Air (1937) as Elmer Lane
- Fit for a King (1937) as Virgil Ambrose Jeremiah Christopher 'Scoop' Jones
- Wide Open Faces (1938) as Wilbur Meeks
- The Gladiator (1938) as Hugo Kipp
- Flirting with Fate (1938) as Dan Dixon
- $1000 a Touchdown (1939) as Marlowe Mansfield Booth
- Beware Spooks! (1939) as Roy L. Gifford
- So You Won't Talk (1940) as Whiskers / 'Brute' Hanson
- Shut My Big Mouth (1942) as Wellington Holmes
- Joan of Ozark (1942) as Cliff Little
- Daring Young Man (1942) as Jonathan Peckinpaw / Grandma Peckinpaw
- Chatterbox (1943) as Rex Vane
- Casanova in Burlesque (1944) as Joseph M. Kelly Jr.
- Pin Up Girl (1944) as Eddie Hall
- Hollywood Canteen (1944) as Joe E. Brown
- The Tender Years (1948) as Rev. Will Norris
- Show Boat (1951) as Cap'n Andy Hawks
- Around the World in 80 Days (1956) as the Fort Kearney stationmaster
- Some Like It Hot (1959) as Osgood Fielding III
- It's a Mad, Mad, Mad, Mad World (1963) as the union official giving a speech at a construction site
- The Comedy of Terrors (1964) as the Cemetery Keeper

== Television roles ==
- The Buick Circus Hour, episode "Premiere Show" (1952) as The Clown
- The Eddie Cantor Comedy Theatre, episode "The Practical Joker" (1955)
- Schlitz Playhouse, episode "Meet Mr. Justice" (1955)
- The Christophers, episodes "Washington as a Young Man" (1955) and "Basis of Law and Order" (1964) (final appearance)
- Screen Directors Playhouse, episode "The Silent Partner" (1955) as Arthur Vail
- The People's Choice, episode "Sox and the Proxy Marriage (1956) as Charles Hollister
- General Electric Theater, episode "The Golden Key" (1956) as Earl Hall
- G.E. Summer Originals, episode "Country Store" (1956) as Joe Brown (unsold pilot for The Joe E. Brown Show)
- The Ann Sothern Show, episode "Olive's Dream Man" (1960) as Mitchell Carson
- Westinghouse Preview Theatre, episode "Five's a Family" (1961) as Harry Canover
- Route 66, episode "Journey to Nineveh" (1962) as Sam Butler
- The Greatest Show on Earth, episode "You're All Right, Ivy" (1964) as Diamond "Dimey" Vine

== Books published ==
- Your Kids and Mine (1944) Your Kids and Mine was published as an Armed Services Edition during World War II.
- Laughter Is a Wonderful Thing (1956)
