= Robert O'Connor (actor) =

Irish-American actor (1885–1962)

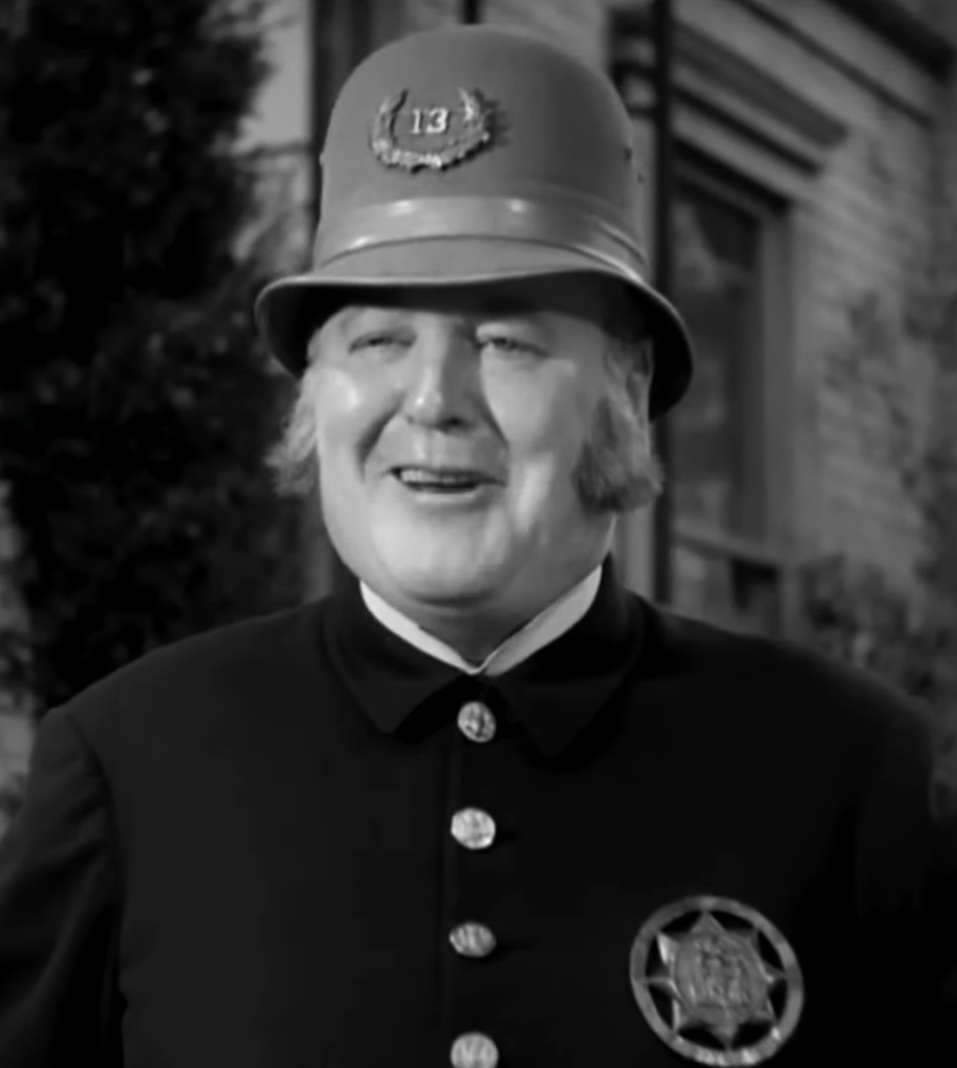
- O'Connor in Little Ford Fauntleroy (1936)
- Born: March 18, 1885; Milwaukee, Wisconsin, U.S.
- Died: September 4, 1962 (aged 77); Hollywood, California, U.S.
- Occupation: Actor
- Years active: 1905–1950
- Spouse(s): Madeline O'Connor (m. 19??)

Robert O'Connor (March 18, 1885 – September 4, 1962) was an American actor. He had a lengthy career as a stage actor on Broadway and in vaudeville from 1905-1931; using the stage name Robert O'Connor in both musicals and plays. After transitioning to film, he also used the names Robert Emmett O'Connor or Robert E. O'Connor for his screen credits. He appeared in more than 200 films between 1919 and 1950; specializing in portraying policemen. He is probably best remembered as the warmhearted bootlegger Paddy Ryan in The Public Enemy (1931) and as police Sergeant Henderson pursuing the Marx Brothers in A Night at the Opera (1935). He also appeared as Jonesy (the older Paramount gate guard) in Billy Wilder's 1950 film Sunset Boulevard. He also made an appearance at the very beginning and very end of the Metro-Goldwyn-Mayer cartoon short Who Killed Who? (1943).

== Partial list of Broadway credits ==
- Fritz in Tammany Hall (1905) as Fergus O'Flaherty
- Mam'zelle Champagne (1906) as Robert O'Connor
- Marcelle (1908) as Pierre
- The Motor Girl (1909) as Felix
- Sweethearts (1913) as Aristide Caniche
- The Lilac Domino (1914) as Casimir
- Flora Bella (1916) as Rosset
- Follow the Girl (1918) as Guillereno Barbarento
- He Didn't Want to Do It (1918) as the waiter
- My Golden Girl (1920) as Wilson
- The Deluge (1922) as Straton
- The Blushing Bride (1922) as Paul Kominski
- Glory (1922) as Deacon Eaton]
- The Old Soak (1922 and 1923) as Al
- New Toys (1924) as Sam Wilks
- Ladies of the Evening (1924-1925) as Frank Forbes
- The City Chap (1925) as Pete
- The Circus Princess (1927) as Stravinsky
- The Prince of Pilsen (1930) as Francois
- Blossom Time (1931) as Novotny

== Selected filmography ==
- Pay Your Dues (1919 short)
- His Royal Slyness (1920 short) (uncredited)
- Never Weaken (1921 short) (uncredited)
- Tin Gods (1926) - Second Foreman
- The Love of Sunya (1927) - Detective with Umbrella (uncredited)
- The Noose (1928) - Jim Conley
- Dressed to Kill (1928) - Detective Gilroy
- Four Walls (1928) - Sullivan
- The Singing Fool (1928) - Cafe Owner, Bill
- Freedom of the Press (1928) - Boss Maloney
- Weary River (1929) - Police Sergeant (uncredited)
- The Office Scandal (1929) - Judge (uncredited)
- Smiling Irish Eyes (1929) - Sir Timothy
- The Isle of Lost Ships (1929) - Jackson
- In the Next Room (1930) - Tim Morel
- Framed (1930) - Sergeant Schultze
- Alias French Gertie (1930) - Detective Kelcey
- The Big Fight (1930) - Detective
- The Big House (1930) - Donlin
- Our Blushing Brides (1930) - The Detective
- Shooting Straight (1930) - Detective Hagen
- Up the River (1930) - Prison Warden (uncredited)
- Man to Man (1930) - Sheriff
- Paid (1930) - Police Sergeant Cassidy
- The Single Sin (1931) - Detective
- Three Girls Lost (1931) - Detective (uncredited)
- The Public Enemy (1931) - Paddy Ryan
- Up for Murder (1931) - Detective Malone (uncredited)
- Three Who Loved (1931) - Police Lieutenant Tom Rooney
- The Public Defender (1931) - Detective Brady
- Fanny Foley Herself (1931) - Burns
- Reckless Living (1931) -Ryan
- Ladies of the Big House (1931) - Detective Martin French (uncredited)
- Two Kinds of Women (1932) - Tim Gohagen
- Taxi! (1932) - Cop with Jewish Man (uncredited)
- The Final Edition (1932) - Police Lieutenant Daniels
- The Beast of the City (1932) - Booking Policeman (uncredited)
- The Big Timer (1932) - Dan Wilson
- Play Girl (1932) - Police Sergeant (uncredited)
- The Arm of the Law (1932) - Detective Captain Blake
- Night World (1932) - The Policeman
- Week-End Marriage (1932) - Eddie - Police Desk Clerk (uncredited)
- The Dark Horse (1932) - Sheriff
- American Madness (1932) - Inspector
- Blessed Event (1932) - Jim - Police Detective (uncredited)
- Blonde Venus (1932) - Dan O'Connor
- The Kid from Spain (1932) - Detective Crawford
- Frisco Jenny (1932) - Sandoval
- The Great Jasper (1933) - Kelly (uncredited)
- Mystery of the Wax Museum (1933) - Joe - Cop (uncredited)
- Gabriel Over the White House (1933) - Corrupt Police Inspector (uncredited)
- Picture Snatcher (1933) - Lt. Nolan
- Bed of Roses (1933) - River Boat Captain Scroggins (uncredited)
- Midnight Mary (1933) - Charlie - the Cop
- Don't Bet on Love (1933) - Edward Shelton
- The Big Brain (1933) - Detective (uncredited)
- Lady for a Day (1933) - Inspector
- Penthouse (1933) - Stevens
- The Big Shakedown (1934) - Regan - Bartender
- Bottoms Up (1934) - Detective Rooney
- Return of the Terror (1934) - Inspector Bradley
- A Wicked Woman (1934) - Dugan (uncredited)
- The Mysterious Mr. Wong (1934) - Officer 'Mac' McGillicuddy
- The Whole Town's Talking (1935) - Police Lt. Mack (uncredited)
- Princess O'Hara (1935) - Gillicudy (uncredited)
- Star of Midnight (1935) - Police Sgt. Cleary
- Stolen Harmony (1935) - Warden Clark (uncredited)
- Let 'Em Have It (1935) - Police Captain
- Diamond Jim (1935) - Brady's Father (uncredited)
- Waterfront Lady (1935) - Police Lieutenant
- A Night at the Opera (1935) - Police Sergeant Henderson
- Coronado (1935) - Hotel Policeman (uncredited)
- White Lies (1935) - Capt. McHenry (uncredited)
- The Lone Wolf Returns (1935) - Detective Benson
- It Had to Happen (1936) - Policeman (scenes deleted)
- Little Lord Fauntleroy (1936) - Policeman
- Kelly the Second (1936) - Policeman Joe (uncredited)
- Jailbreak (1936) - Policeman (uncredited)
- Sinner Take All (1936) - Police Capt. Greenwood (uncredited)
- Sing Me a Love Song (1936) - Detective (uncredited)
- We Who Are About to Die (1937) - Detective Mitchell
- Girl Overboard (1937) - Sergeant Hatton
- When You're in Love (1937) - Assistant Immigration Officer (uncredited)
- The Crime Nobody Saw (1937) - Officer Tim Harrigan
- Her Husband Lies (1937) - Bartender (uncredited)
- Park Avenue Logger (1937) - Police Sergeant
- Waikiki Wedding (1937) - Policeman (uncredited)
- A Star Is Born (1937) - Santa Anita Clubhouse Bartender (uncredited)
- The Frame-Up (1937) - Larry Mann aka John Mench
- The Last Train from Madrid (1937) - Secret Service Man (uncredited)
- Riding on Air (1937) - Detective Flynn (uncredited)
- New Faces of 1937 (1937) - Policeman (uncredited)
- Super-Sleuth (1937) - Casey
- Big City (1937) - Comet Cab Driver (scenes deleted)
- Trapped by G-Men (1937) - Federal Agent Jim
- Boy of the Streets (1937) - Police Officer Rourke
- Wells Fargo (1937) - Sea Captain (uncredited)
- Professor Beware (1938) - Cop at Estate (uncredited)
- Made for Each Other (1939) - Harry - Elevator Starter (uncredited)
- You Can't Get Away with Murder (1939) - First Detective (uncredited)
- Sergeant Madden (1939) - Capt. Crane (uncredited)
- The Streets of New York (1939) - Police Officer Burke
- Joe and Ethel Turp Call on the President (1939) - Pat Donegan
- The Lone Wolf Strikes (1940) - House Detective (uncredited)
- Double Alibi (1940) - Patrolman Delaney
- I Take This Oath (1940) - Police Car Driver (uncredited)
- Hot Steel (1940) - Police Inspector
- A Fugitive from Justice (1940) - Murphy
- Dance, Girl, Dance (1940) - Plainclothesman at Palais Royale (uncredited)
- No Time for Comedy (1940) - Desk Sergeant (uncredited)
- Tight Shoes (1941) - Honest John Beebe
- Fiesta Time (1941) - Bus Driver (uncredited)
- Maisie Gets Her Man (1942) - Benefit Stage Manager (uncredited)
- Jackass Mail (1942) - Peter Lawson (uncredited)
- Pierre of the Plains (1942) - Magistrate Lowry (uncredited)
- Tish (1942) - Game Warden (uncredited)
- The Omaha Trail (1942) - Oxen Owner (uncredited)
- Tennessee Johnson (1942) - Robinson (uncredited)
- Andy Hardy's Double Life (1942) - Train Conductor (uncredited)
- The Human Comedy (1943) - Bartender (uncredited)
- Harrigan's Kid (1943) - Murphy (uncredited)
- Slightly Dangerous (1943) - Reporter (uncredited)
- Air Raid Wardens (1943) - Charlie Beaugart
- Dr. Gillespie's Criminal Case (1943) - Samson (uncredited)
- Best Foot Forward (1943) - Train Conductor (uncredited)
- Young Ideas (1943) - Train Conductor (uncredited)
- Swing Shift Maisie (1943) - Proprietor (uncredited)
- Lost Angel (1943) - Policeman (uncredited)
- Whistling in Brooklyn (1943) - Detective Leo Finnigan
- Rationing (1944) - Sheriff McGuiness (uncredited)
- Broadway Rhythm (1944) - Stage Manager (uncredited)
- Meet the People (1944) - Theatre Attendant (uncredited)
- Barbary Coast Gent (1944) - Joe - Bartender (uncredited)
- An American Romance (1944) - Open Pit Irish Foreman (uncredited)
- The Thin Man Goes Home (1944) - Baggage Attendant on Train (uncredited)
- Meet Me in St. Louis (1944) - Motorman (uncredited)
- Nothing but Trouble (1944) - Police Officer Mulligan (uncredited)
- Music for Millions (1944) - Policeman (uncredited)
- Gentle Annie (1944) - Childers - Bartender
- Main Street After Dark (1945) - Policeman (uncredited)
- The Clock (1945) - Policeman (uncredited)
- Anchors Aweigh (1945) - Cop (uncredited)
- Abbott and Costello in Hollywood (1945) - 2nd Studio Guard (uncredited)
- They Were Expendable (1945) - Silver Dollar Bartender (uncredited)
- Adventure (1945) - Man in Cantina (uncredited)
- The Harvey Girls (1946) - Conductor (uncredited)
- Up Goes Maisie (1946) - Rose Bowl Watchman (uncredited)
- A Letter for Evie (1946) - Mr. Clancy (uncredited)
- The Hoodlum Saint (1946) - Police Desk Sergeant (uncredited)
- Cuban Pete (1946) - Cuban Servant (uncredited)
- Boys' Ranch (1946) - Druggist
- Courage of Lassie (1946) - Deputy (uncredited)
- Three Wise Fools (1946) - Chief of Police (uncredited)
- Undercurrent (1946) - Stationmaster (uncredited)
- Till the Clouds Roll By (1946) - Ed (uncredited)
- The Show-Off (1946) - Motorman (uncredited)
- The Mighty McGurk (1947) - Bartender (uncredited)
- Trail Street (1947) - Drunk (uncredited)
- High Barbaree (1947) - Stationmaster (uncredited)
- Honeymoon (1947) - Gardener (uncredited)
- Living in a Big Way (1947) - Bailiff (uncredited)
- The Hucksters (1947) - Frank - Hotel Doorman (uncredited)
- The Romance of Rosy Ridge (1947) - Southerner (uncredited)
- The Unfinished Dance (1947) - Mr. Brown - an Engineer (uncredited)
- Merton of the Movies (1947) - Mac - Restaurant Counterman (uncredited)
- High Wall (1947) - Joe (uncredited)
- Alias a Gentleman (1948) - Doorman (uncredited)
- Tenth Avenue Angel (1948) - Mr. O'Callan (uncredited)
- The Bride Goes Wild (1948) - Conductor (uncredited)
- B.F.'s Daughter (1948) - Conductor (uncredited)
- Easter Parade (1948) - Policeman (uncredited)
- Sunset Boulevard (1950) - Jonesy - Older Paramount Gate Guard (uncredited)
- Watch the Birdie (1950) - Policeman (uncredited)
