= J. Carrol Naish =

American actor (1896–1973)

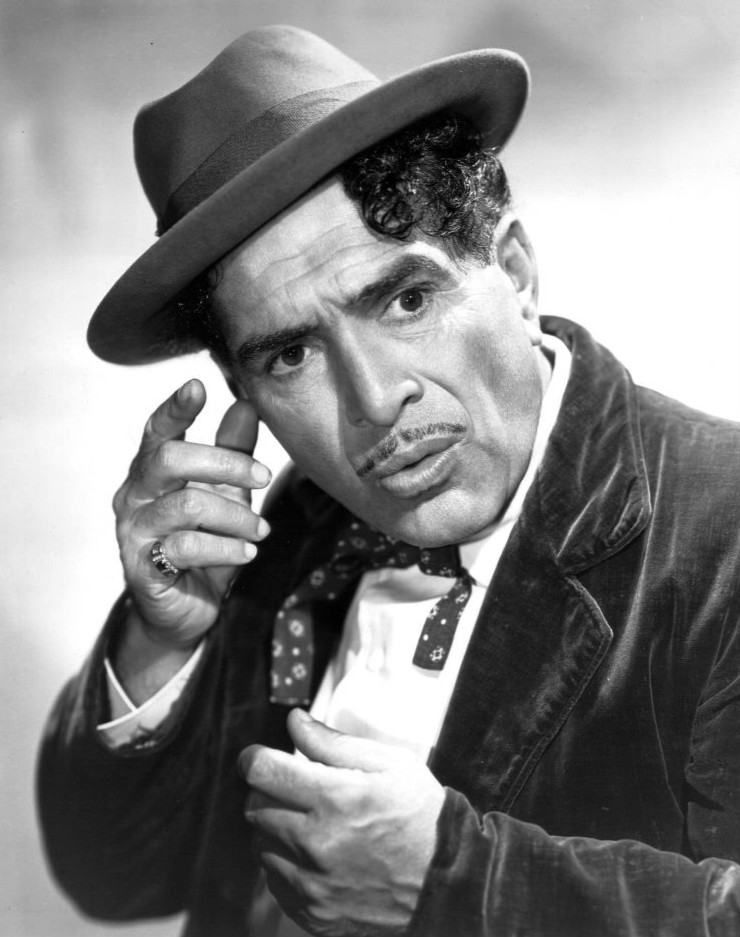
- Naish as Luigi Basco in the radio program Life with Luigi (1950)
- Born: Joseph Patrick Carrol Naish; January 21, 1896; New York City, U.S.
- Died: January 24, 1973 (aged 77); La Jolla, California, U.S.
- Resting place: Calvary Cemetery, East Los Angeles, California, U.S.
- Occupation: Actor
- Years active: 1926–1971
- Spouse: Gladys Heaney (m. 1929)
- Children: 1

Joseph Patrick Carrol Naish (January 21, 1896 – January 24, 1973) was an American actor. He appeared in over 200 films during the Golden Age of Hollywood.

He became a dialect specialist, and was called upon to play character roles of many nationalities, including Southern European (especially Italian), Eastern European, Latin American, American Indians, Middle Eastern, South Asian, East Asian, Pacific Islander—even black, which earned him the moniker "Hollywood's one-man U.N." His own heritage was Irish, but he rarely played Irish characters, explaining, "When the part of an Irishman comes along, nobody ever thinks of me." (Note: He did, however, play the Irish-American General Sheridan in Rio Grande.)

Naish received two Oscar nominations for his supporting roles in the films Sahara (1943) and A Medal for Benny (1945), the latter of which also earned him a Golden Globe. He was honored with a star on the Hollywood Walk of Fame in 1960.

== Early life ==
Naish was born in New York City on January 21, 1896. According to the actor's 1945 résumé, he was educated at St. Cecilia's Academy in New York City, and appeared on stage in Paris and New York before beginning his screen career.

== Career ==
Although he played an uncredited bit role in the silent film What Price Glory? (1926), Naish said his screen career didn't actually begin until 1930, when stage actors were being recruited for the new talking pictures. He became a prolific supporting actor, appearing in more than 200 films. He was twice nominated for an Academy Award for Best Supporting Actor, the first for his role as Giuseppe in the movie Sahara (1943), in which he delivers the propaganda speech:

Mussolini is not so clever like Hitler, he can dress up his Italians only to look like thieves, cheats, murderers, he cannot like Hitler make them feel like that. He cannot like Hitler scrape from their conscience the knowledge right is right and wrong is wrong, or dig holes in their heads to plant his own Ten Commandments- Steal from thy neighbor, Cheat thy neighbor, Kill thy neighbor! But are my eyes blind that I must fall to my knees to worship a maniac who has made of my country a concentration camp, who has made of my people slaves? Must I kiss the hand that beats me, lick the boot that kicks me? NO!

The second was for his performance as the title character's Hispanic father in the movie A Medal for Benny (1945). For the latter film, he won the Golden Globe Award for Best Supporting Actor – Motion Picture.

Naish, Zachary Scott and Norman Lloyd in The Southerner (1945)

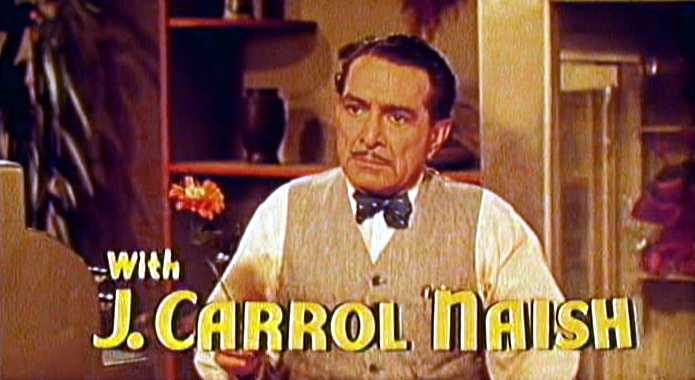
J. Carrol Naish from a trailer for the film Hit the Deck (1955)

He often played villains, from gangsters in numerous Paramount pictures to mad scientists, such as Dr. Daka in Columbia's Batman serial. In this screen adaptation of the comic book, Naish was originally cast as The Joker, but was recast as a Japanese supervillain suitable to the patriotic wartime plotline.

In the 1940s Naish was a supporting character in a number of horror films. He played Boris Karloff's assistant in House of Frankenstein (1944).

On radio, Naish starred as Luigi Basco on the CBS program Life with Luigi (1948–1953). Luigi's popularity resulted in a CBS television series of the same name, with Naish reprising his role.

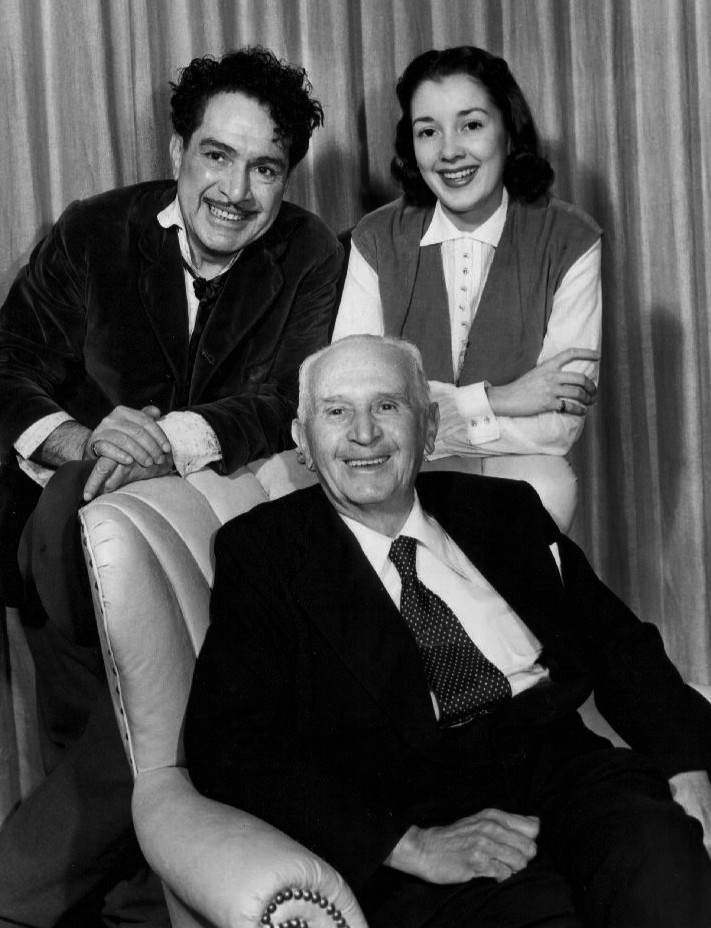
Three generations of Naishes in 1952. Seated is Patrick Naish; standing are his son, J. Carrol, and granddaughter, Elaine. Elaine Naish was an actress who often played supporting roles on Life With Luigi.

In 1955, Naish originated the role of Alfieri in the one-act, verse version of Arthur Miller's A View from the Bridge on Broadway, also starring Van Heflin and Eileen Heckart.

In 1957–1958, Naish played the lead role in the television series The New Adventures of Charlie Chan. Speaking in 2023, co-star James Hong said Naish had him fired from the series just because Hong had missed a single line, and accused Naish of having held "a deep prejudice".

Naish worked mostly in guest roles on television through the 1960s; his most recent motion picture credit was from 1964. In 1971, the 75-year-old actor was coaxed out of retirement by producer and horror-film enthusiast Samuel M. Sherman to star in a new big-screen thriller, Dracula vs. Frankenstein (1971). Naish played a descendant of the original Dr. Frankenstein, who takes to murdering young women for experimentation in hopes of reviving his ancestor's creation. His mute assistant was played by Lon Chaney Jr. Dracula vs. Frankenstein was the last film of both Naish and Chaney.

== Personal life ==
Naish was married (from 1929 until his death) to actress Gladys Heaney; they had one daughter, Elaine.

== Death ==
Naish retired to San Diego and died of emphysema on January 24, 1973, at Scripps Memorial Hospital in La Jolla, California, three days after his 77th birthday. He is interred at Calvary Cemetery in East Los Angeles, California. For his contributions to television, he has a star on the Hollywood Walk of Fame at 6145 Hollywood Boulevard.

== Filmography ==
=== Film ===
Year	Title	Role	Notes
1926	What Price Glory	French Soldier	Uncredited
1930	Cheer Up and Smile	Bit Part	Uncredited
1931	The Royal Bed	Laker	Credited as Carrol Naish
1931	Gun Smoke	Mink Gordon	
1931	Surrender	French Prisoner of War	Uncredited
1931	Tonight or Never	Radio Announcer	Uncredited
1931	The Finger Points	Phone Voice ("The Finger is on You")	Uncredited
1932	The Hatchet Man	Sun Yat Ming	Credited as J. Carroll Naish; Alternative title: The Honorable Mr. Wong
1932	The Beast of the City	Cholo	
1932	No Living Witness	Nick	
1932	The Mouthpiece	Tony Rocco	Credited as J. Carroll Naish
1932	The Famous Ferguson Case	Claude Wright	
1932	Two Seconds	Tony	Credited as J. Carroll Naish
1932	Crooner	Nick Meyer	
1932	Big City Blues	Bootlegger	Uncredited
1932	Tiger Shark	Tony	Credited as J. Carroll Naish
1932	The Kid from Spain	Pedro	
1932	Frisco Jenny	Ed Harris	Uncredited
1932	Week-End Marriage	Joe	Uncredited
1933	No Other Woman	Bonelli	
1933	The Past of Mary Holmes	Gary Kent	
1933	Infernal Machine	Bryan	Uncredited
1933	Central Airport	Drunk in wreck	Uncredited
1933	The World Gone Mad	Ramon Salvadore	
1933	Elmer, the Great	Jerry	Credited as J. Carroll Naish
1933	The Devil's in Love	Salazar	
1933	Arizona to Broadway	Tommy Monk	
1933	Captured!	Cpl. Guarand	Credited as J. Carroll Naish
1933	Ann Vickers	Dr. Sorelle	Credited as J. Carroll Naish
1933	The Mad Game	Chopper Allen	
1933	Havana Widows	First Taxi Driver	Uncredited
1933	The Mystery Squadron	Collins	Film serial
1934	Upper World	Lou Colima	Credited as J. Carroll Naish
1934	What's Your Racket?	Dick Graves	
1934	Murder in Trinidad	Duval	
1934	One Is Guilty	Jack Allen	
1934	British Agent	Commissioner of War Trotsky	Credited as J. Carroll Naish
1934	Maria Galante	French Sailor Painting Ship	Uncredited
1934	The President Vanishes	Anti-War Demonstrator	Uncredited
1935	The Lives of a Bengal Lancer	Grand Vizier	
1935	Black Fury	Steve Croner	
1935	Front Page Woman	Robert Cardoza	Credited as J. Carroll Naish
1935	The Crusades	Arab Slave Dealer	Uncredited
1935	Little Big Shot	Bert	Credited as J. Carroll Naish
1935	Special Agent	Joe Durell	Credited as J. Carroll Naish
1935	Confidential	'Lefty' Tate	
1935	Captain Blood	Cahusac	Credited as J. Carroll Naish
1936	Two in the Dark	Burt Mansfield	
1936	Exclusive Story	Comos	
1936	Robin Hood of El Dorado	Three-Fingered Jack	
1936	Charlie Chan at the Circus	Tom Holt	
1936	Moonlight Murder	Bejac	
1936	Absolute Quiet	Pedro	
1936	Special Investigator	Edward J. Selton	
1936	Anthony Adverse	Maj. Doumet	Credited as J. Carroll Naish
1936	Ramona	Juan Can	
1936	The Charge of the Light Brigade	Subahdar-Major Puran Singh	
1936	Exclusive Story	Comos	
1936	Crack-Up	Operative #77	
1937	Border Cafe	Rocky Alton	
1937	Think Fast, Mr. Moto	Adram	
1937	Hideaway	Mike Clarke	
1937	Sea Racketeers	Harry Durant	
1937	Bulldog Drummond Comes Back	Mikhail Valdin	
1937	Thunder Trail	Rafael Lopez	
1937	Daughter of Shanghai	Frank Barden	
1938	Her Jungle Love	Kuasa	
1938	Bulldog Drummond in Africa	Richard Lane	
1938	King of Alcatraz	Steve Murkil	
1939	Persons in Hiding	Freddie 'Gunner' Martin	
1939	Hotel Imperial	Kuprin	
1939	Beau Geste	Rasinoff	
1939	Island of Lost Men	Gregory Prin	
1940	Typhoon	Mekaike	
1940	Queen of the Mob	George Frost	
1940	Golden Gloves	Joe Taggerty	
1940	Down Argentine Way	Casiano	
1941	Mr. Dynamite	Professor	
1941	That Night in Rio	Machado	
1941	Blood and Sand	Garabato	
1941	Accent on Love	Manuel Lombroso	
1941	Forced Landing	Andros Banshek	
1941	Birth of the Blues	Blackie	
1941	The Corsican Brothers	Lorenzo	
1942	A Gentleman at Heart	Gigi	
1942	Sunday Punch	Matt Bassler	
1942	Dr. Broadway	Jack Venner	
1942	Jackass Mail	Signor Michel O'Sullivan	
1942	The Pied Piper	Aristide Rougeron	
1942	Tales of Manhattan	Costello	
1942	Dr. Renault's Secret	Noel	
1943	Batman	Dr. Tito Daka/Prince Daka	Film serial
1943	Behind the Rising Sun	Reo Seki	
1943	Sahara	Giuseppe	Nominated: Academy Award for Best Supporting Actor
1943	Calling Dr. Death	Inspector Gregg	
1943	Gung Ho!	Lt. C.J. Cristoforos	
1944	Voice in the Wind	Luigi	
1944	The Whistler	The Killer	
1944	The Monster Maker	Dr. Igor Markoff	
1944	Jungle Woman	Dr. Carl Fletcher	
1944	Waterfront	Dr. Karl Decker	
1944	Dragon Seed	Japanese Kitchen Overseer	
1944	Enter Arsène Lupin	Ganimard	
1944	House of Frankenstein	Daniel	
1945	A Medal for Benny	Charley Martin	Won: Golden Globe Award for Best Supporting Actor – Motion Picture; Nominated: Academy Award for Best Supporting Actor
1945	The Southerner	Devers	
1945	Strange Confession	Roger Graham	Alternative title: The Missing Head
1945	Star in the Night	Nick Catapoli	Short film
1945	Getting Gertie's Garter	Charles, the butler	
1946	Bad Bascomb	Bart Yancy	
1946	The Beast with Five Fingers	Police Commissario Ovidio Castanio	
1946	Humoresque	Rudy Boray	
1947	Carnival in Costa Rica	Papa Rico Molina	
1947	The Fugitive	A Police Informer	
1948	Joan of Arc	John, Count of Luxembourg (Joan's captor)	
1948	The Kissing Bandit	Chico	
1949	Canadian Pacific	Dynamite Dawson	
1949	That Midnight Kiss	Papa Donnetti	
1950	Black Hand	Louis Lorelli	
1950	Please Believe Me	"Lucky" Reilly	
1950	Annie Get Your Gun	Chief Sitting Bull	
1950	The Toast of New Orleans	Nicky Duvalle	
1950	Rio Grande	Lt. Gen. Philip Sheridan	
1951	The Mark of the Renegade	Luis	
1951	Across the Wide Missouri	Looking Glass	
1951	Bannerline	Frankie Scarbine	
1952	Denver and Rio Grande	Gil Harkness	
1952	Clash by Night	Uncle Vince	
1952	Ride the Man Down	Sheriff Joe Kneen	
1952	The Miracle of Our Lady of Fatima	Narrator	Uncredited
1953	Fighter Attack	Bruno	
1953	Beneath the 12-Mile Reef	Socrates "Soc" Houlis	
1954	Saskatchewan	Batouche	
1954	Sitting Bull	Sitting Bull	
1955	New York Confidential	Ben Dagajanian	
1955	Hit the Deck	Mr. Peroni	
1955	Rage at Dawn	Simeon "Sim" Reno	
1955	Violent Saturday	Chapman, Bank Robber	
1955	The Last Command	General Antonio Lopez de Santa Ana	
1955	Desert Sands	Sgt. Diepel	
1956	Rebel in Town	Bedloe Mason	
1956	Yaqui Drums	Yacqi Jack	
1957	This Could Be the Night	Leon	
1957	The Young Don't Cry	Plug	
1961	Force of Impulse	Antonio Marino	
1971	Dracula vs. Frankenstein	Dr. Frankenstein, aka Dr. Duryea	

=== Television ===
Year	Title	Role	Notes
1952–1953	Life with Luigi	Luigi Basco	Unknown episodes
1956	Climax!	Mr. Combie	Episode: "An Episode of Sparrows"
1956	The Alcoa Hour	Murillo	Episode: "Key Largo"
1956	Crossroads	Rabbi Arnold Fischel	2 episodes, including "The White Carnation"
1957–1958	The New Adventures of Charlie Chan	Charlie Chan	39 episodes
1957	The Texan	Walt Pierce	Episode: "The First Notch"
1958	Westinghouse Desilu Playhouse	Papa	Episode: "My Father, the Fool"
1958	Wanted: Dead or Alive	Miguel Ramierez	Episode: "Ricochet"
1958	Cimarron City	Rare Crowder	Episode: "The Blood Line"
1959	The Restless Gun	Maj. Quint Langley	Episode: "Blood of Courage"
1959	Whirlybirds	Taylor	Episode: "Two of a Kind"
1959–1960	Wagon Train	Various roles	' The Old Man Charvanaugh Story '; 'The Benjamin Burns Story '
1960	The Untouchables	Joe Bucco	Episode: "The Noise of Death"
1960–1961	Guestward, Ho!	Hawkeye	38 episodes
1963	Route 66	Mike Donato	Episode: "And Make Thunder His Tribute"
1964	The Hanged Man	Uncle Picaud	Television film
1964	Burke's Law	Mr. Toto	Episode: "Who Killed Supersleuth?"
1965	I Dream of Jeannie	Bilejik	Episode: "Djinn and Water"
1966	The Man from U.N.C.L.E.	Uncle Giuliano	Episode: "The Super-Colossal Affair"
1967	Green Acres	Chief Yellow Horse	Episode: "It's So Peaceful in the Country"
1969	Bonanza	Anselmo	Episode: "A Severe Case of Matrimony"
1968	Get Smart	Sam Vittorio	Episode: "The Secret of Sam Vittorio"

=== Radio ===
Year	Program	Episode/source
1945	Suspense	"Footfalls"
1946	The Fifth Horseman	Aftermath
1947	Family Theater	Let Us Remember
1952	Suspense	Treasure Hunt
1953	Family Theater	Two Tickets for Stockholm
