= Moonlight Murder =

1936 film by Edwin L. Marin

- Directed by: Edwin L. Marin
- Screenplay by: Florence Ryerson; Edgar Allan Woolf
- Story by: Albert J. Cohen; Robert T. Shannon
- Produced by: Lucien Hubbard; Ned Marin
- Starring: Chester Morris; Madge Evans; Leo Carrillo; Frank McHugh; Benita Hume; Grant Mitchell; Katharine Alexander; J. Carrol Naish
- Cinematography: Charles G. Clarke
- Edited by: Ben Lewis
- Music by: Herbert Stothart; Edward Ward
- Production company: Metro-Goldwyn-Mayer
- Distributed by: Metro-Goldwyn-Mayer
- Release date: March 27, 1936
- Running time: 66 minutes
- Country: United States
- Language: English

Moonlight Murder is a 1936 American crime film directed by Edwin L. Marin and written by Florence Ryerson and Edgar Allan Woolf. The film stars Chester Morris, Madge Evans, Leo Carrillo, Frank McHugh, Benita Hume, Grant Mitchell, Katharine Alexander and J. Carrol Naish. The film was released on March 27, 1936, by Metro-Goldwyn-Mayer.

== Plot ==
A young police detective gets a chance to test his sleuthing skills when an opera singer is murdered at the Hollywood Bowl.

== Cast ==
- Chester Morris as Steve Farrell
- Madge Evans as Toni Adams
- Leo Carrillo as Gino D'Acosta
- Frank McHugh as William
- Benita Hume as Diana
- Grant Mitchell as Dr. Adams
- Katharine Alexander as Louisa Chiltern
- J. Carrol Naish as Bejac
- H. B. Warner as Godfrey Chiltern ...
- Duncan Renaldo as Pedro
- Leonard Ceeley as Ivan Bosloff
- Robert McWade as Police Chief Quinlan
- Pedro de Cordoba as Swami
- Charles Trowbridge as Stage Manager
