= The Dark Horse (1932 film) =

1932 film

- Directed by: Alfred E. Green
- Screenplay by: Joseph Jackson; Wilson Mizner
- Story by: Courtney Terrett; Darryl F. Zanuck
- Produced by: Samuel Bischoff; Darryl F. Zanuck (uncredited)
- Starring: Warren William; Bette Davis; Guy Kibbee
- Cinematography: Sol Polito
- Edited by: George Marks
- Music by: Leo F. Forbstein
- Production company: First National Pictures
- Distributed by: Warner Bros. Pictures
- Release date: June 8, 1932
- Running time: 75 minutes
- Country: United States
- Language: English

The Dark Horse is a 1932 American pre-Code political comedy film, starring Warren William and Bette Davis. The movie was directed by Alfred E. Green.

== Plot ==
The Progressive Party convention is deadlocked for governor, and so both sides nominate the dark horse Zachary Hicks. Kay Russell suggests they hire Hal Blake as campaign manager; but first they have to get him out of jail for not paying alimony. Blake organizes the office and coaches Hicks to answer every question by pausing and then saying, "Well yes, but then again no." Blake will sell Hicks as dumb but honest. Russell refuses to marry Blake, while Joe keeps people away from Blake's office. Blake teaches Hicks a speech by Lincoln ("...I have no wealthy or popular relations to recommend me..."). At the debate when the conservative candidate Underwood recites the same speech, Blake exposes him as a plagiarist. Hicks is presented for photo opportunities and gives his yes-and-no answer to any question, including whether he expects to win.

When Blake's ex-wife Maybelle arrives at the office demanding to see him about another missed alimony payment, Joe wards her off by claiming Blake's aunt died and that he is away settling a big inheritance; but as she is leaving, Hicks makes eyes at her and takes her in to see Blake. She demands money or will send Blake back to jail. Blake asks Kay for $400 and pays Maybelle. Discovering its purpose, Kay angrily grabs the money back but returns it to Maybelle after receiving in the morning mail a necklace from Blake with a sentimental message. With Hicks heavily favored, Blake is expecting a $50,000 bonus for winning the election and gets Kay to agree to marry.

Underwood's manager Black secretly meets with Maybelle, who has been seeing Hicks, and plans a set-up to disgrace Hicks on the eve of the election. Maybelle lures Hicks out of town after he slips away from Joe, who is supposed to be watching over him. They go to a cabin where Maybelle initiates a game of strip poker with the candidate. Black brings the sheriff; but Blake and Joe get there first to remove Hicks, who has been reduced to a union suit. As Joe and Hicks escape out the back, the sheriff tries to arrest Blake for crossing a state line for immoral purposes. Blake claims they are married but has to wed Maybelle again to satisfy the sheriff. Kay walks out on Blake; but after Hicks wins the election, Blake gets Kay arrested for abandoning a child- him. They decide to head for Nevada to manage another campaign, while arranging another divorce and marriage.

== Cast ==
- Warren William as Hal Samson Blake
- Bette Davis as Kay Russell
- Guy Kibbee as Zachary Hicks
- Vivienne Osborne as Maybelle Blake, Hal's Ex-Wife
- Frank McHugh as Joe
- Sam Hardy as Mr Black
- Harry Holman as Mr Jones
- Charles Sellon as Mr Green
- Robert Emmett O'Connor as Sheriff
- Berton Churchill as William A. Underwood
- Robert Warwick as Mr Clark
- Jim Thorpe as Blackfeet Chief (uncredited)
