= Vivienne Osborne =

American actress (1896–1961)

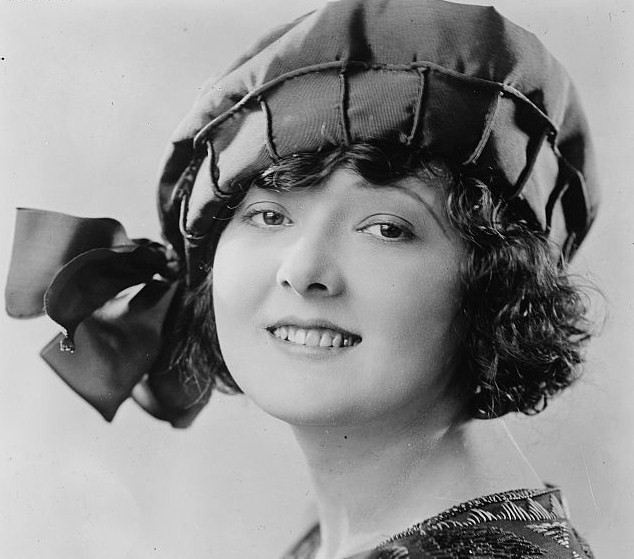
- Osborne in 1921
- Born: Vera Vivienne Spragg; December 10, 1896; Des Moines, Iowa, U.S.
- Died: June 10, 1961 (aged 64); Malibu, California, U.S.
- Other names: Vivian Osborne
- Occupation: Actress
- Years active: 1905–1946
- Spouse: Francis Worthington Hine (m. 1925; div. 1934)

Vivienne Osborne (born Vera Vivienne Spragg; December 10, 1896 – June 10, 1961) was an American stage and film actress known for her work in Broadway theatre and in silent and sound films.

== Career ==
Osborne began her career on stage when she was 5 years old, and by the time she was 18 years old, she had spent many years touring throughout Washington with a stock theater company. She made her Broadway debut in The Whirlwind (1919), and her screen debut in 1919 in a film that never was released. She continued work on Broadway, and appeared in films when not working theater.

Osborne's first silent film was in The Gray Brother, but the film did not have distribution and never was released. From March through December 1928, she appeared in the Florenz Ziegfeld musical version of The Three Musketeers. It was after her performance that Douglas Fairbanks Sr. offered her a role in The Iron Mask (1929), his last silent film, made as a sequel to his 1921 film The Three Musketeers. Rather than accept the offer, she chose to remain in New York City and continue her career. She signed with Paramount Studios in 1931 and was assigned to character roles, but left to sign with Warner Studios to get better roles. She then left Warners and signed a three-year contract with Radio Pictures. She alternated between film and stage roles for the rest of her career.

Of her work in the musical The Three Musketeers, Theatre Magazine wrote her voice was "of true operatic quality." Of her work as Mary Boyd in the 1931 film Husband's Holiday, Spokesman-Review wrote "Vivienne Osborne does fine work," and noted the several scenes which "tugged at the heartstrings" that were well done by Osborne and her co-star Juliette Compton.

== Filmography ==
Silent films

- The Grey Brother (1919)
- In Walked Mary (1920) as Betsy Caldwell
- The Restless Sex (1920)
- Love's Flame (1920) as Adele De Ronsard
- Over the Hill to the Poorhouse (1920) as Isabella Strong
- The Right Way (1921) as The Sweetheart
- Mother Eternal (1921) as Julia Brennon
- Cameron of the Royal Mounted (1921) as Mandy Haley
- The Good Provider (1922) as Pearl Binswanger

Sound films

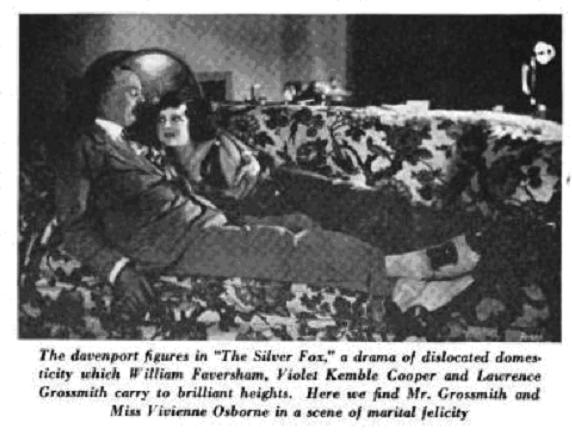
With Lawrence Grossmith in The Silver Fox - Arts and Decoration Magazine 1921

- Night Club (1929) as Herself
- Morgan's Maruders (1929)
- Masquerade (1931)
- The Beloved Bachelor (1931) as Elinor Hunter
- Husband's Holiday (1931) as Mary Boyd
- Two Kinds of Women (1932) as Helen
- The Famous Ferguson Case (1932) as Mrs. Marcia Ferguson
- Two Seconds (1932) as Shirley Day
- Week-End Marriage (1932) as Shirley
- The Dark Horse (1932) as Maybelle Blake
- Life Begins (1932) as Mrs. McGilvary
- Men Are Such Fools (1932) as Lilli Arno
- Luxury Liner (1933) as Sybil Brenhard
- Sailor Be Good (1933) as Red Dale
- The Phantom Broadcast (1933) as Elsa Evans
- Supernatural (1933) as Ruth Rogen
- Tomorrow at Seven (1933) as Martha Winters
- The Devil's in Love (1933) as Rena Corday
- No More Ladies (1935) as Lady Diana Knowleton
- Let's Sing Again (1936) as Rosa Donelli
- Follow Your Heart (1936) as Gloria Forrester
- Wives Never Know (1936) as Renée La Journée
- Sinner Take All (1936) as Alicia MacKelvey
- Champagne Waltz (1937) as Countess Mariska
- The Crime Nobody Saw (1937) as Suzanne Duval
- She Asked for It (1937) as Celia Stettin
- Men Are Such Fools (1938) as Lili Arno (uncredited)
- Primrose Path (1940) as Thelma
- Captain Caution (1940) as Victorine Argandeau
- So You Won't Talk (1940) as Maxie Carewe
- I Accuse My Parents (1944) as Mrs. Wilson
- Dragonwyck (1946) as Johanna Van Ryn

== Broadway theater ==
- Order Please (October 9, 1934 – October 1934) as Phoebe Weston
- As Good as New (November 3, 1930 – December 1930) as Mrs. Violet Hargrave
- The Royal Virgin (March 17, 1930 – March 1930) as The Countess of Rutland
- Week-End (October 22, 1929 – October 1929) as Marga Chapman
- The Three Musketeers (March 13, 1928 – December 15, 1928) as Lady De Winter
- One Glorious Hour (April 14, 1927 – May 1927) as Maria
- Fog (February 7, 1927 – May 1927) as Eunice
- ‘’The Harem’’ (June 1925) Replaced Lenore Ulric as Carla
- Aloma of the South Seas (April 20, 1925 – June 1925) as Aloma
- Houses of Sand (February 17, 1925 – March 1925) as Miss Kane
- The Blue Bandanna (June 23, 1924 - July 1924) as The Girl
- New Toys (February 18, 1924 – March 1924) as Ruth Webb
- Scaramouche (October 24, 1923 – December 1923) as Climene
- The Love Child (November 14, 1922 – April 1923) as Aline De Mar
- The Silver Fox (September 5, 1921 – December 1921) as Frankie Turner
- The Bonehead (April 12, 1920 – May 1920) as Jean Brent
- The Whirlwind (December 23, 1919 – February 1920) as Bessie Van Ashton
