= Supernatural (film) =

1933 horror film directed by Victor Hugo Halperin

- Theatrical release poster
- Directed by: Victor Halperin
- Written by: Brian Marlow; Harvey Thew
- Story by: Garnett Weston
- Produced by: Edward Halperin
- Starring: Carole Lombard; Alan Dinehart; Vivienne Osborne
- Cinematography: Arthur Martinelli
- Color process: Black and white
- Distributed by: Paramount Pictures
- Release date: April 21, 1933 (New York City)
- Running time: 65 minutes
- Country: United States
- Language: English

Supernatural is a 1933 American pre-Code supernatural horror film directed by Victor Halperin, and starring Carole Lombard, Alan Dinehart, Vivienne Osborne, Randolph Scott, and H. B. Warner. The film follows a woman who attends a staged séance only to find herself possessed by the spirit of an executed murderess.

The film was the followup to Halperin's White Zombie and uses many members of the crew from that film in its production. Trouble grew on the set between Carole Lombard and the director as Lombard felt she was more suited for comedy films. Tensions on the set were compounded by the 1933 Long Beach earthquake, which temporarily stopped production. The film was not as financially successful as White Zombie on its initial release, though it did attain a cult following in the decades after its release.

== Plot ==
In New York City, Ruth Rogen is on death row for murdering three of her former lovers. Her fourth lover, a charlatan psychic named Paul Bavian, betrayed her to the police. Dr. Carl Houston believes the evil spirit of an executed murderer goes abroad to commit more crimes after death, and he gets permission to experiment on Rogen's body after she is executed via the electric chair.

Trailer for Supernatural

Meanwhile, heiress Roma Courtney is contacted by Bavian, who claims her recently deceased twin brother, John, wants to send her a message. When Bavian's landlady threatens to expose him, he murders her with a ring that has a poisoned needle. Roma and her fiancé, Grant Wilson, attend a séance performed by Bavian. Bavian tricks Roma into believing her brother was murdered by Hammond, manager of the Courtney estate. Roma and Grant leave the séance, and visit Dr. Houston. He is busy in his laboratory trying to reanimate Rogen's body by pumping the corpse full of electricity. When Rogen's eyes open, the shocked couple are asked to leave the lab as Dr. Houston explains what he is attempting to do. Suddenly, a wind bursts through the room and the spirit of Rogen tries to enter Roma's body, leaving fingerprints on Roma's neck.

In an attempt to prove Bavian a fraud, Grant schedules a second séance at Roma's home. Once more, Bavian uses tricks to convince Roma that Hammond is a murderer. Hammond scuffles with Bavian, and Bavian uses his ring to kill Hammond. At that moment, Rogen's spirit enters Roma's body. The possessed Roma agrees to leave with Bavian. They go to her former apartment. Bavian doesn't realize Roma is possessed and Bavian declares his disdain for Rogen and his desire for Roma. When the landlord tells them to leave, Bavian suggests they adjourn to Roma's yacht. They passionately embrace. Meanwhile, Grant aided by John's ghost, realizes Roma is possessed and rushes to the yacht. At the yacht during afterglow, Bavian and Roma exchange chatter and Bavian gets spooked by Roma's mannerisms that seem similar to Rogen's. Grant arrives just in time to prevent Rogen/Roma from strangling Bavian and Bavian from killing Roma. Exposed, Bavian runs and as he tries to leave, Rogen's spirit follows and wraps a rope around his neck, hanging him. Rogen's spirit departs. John's spirit subtly urges the two to marry.

== Cast ==
- Carole Lombard as Roma Courtney
- Alan Dinehart as Paul Bavian
- Vivienne Osborne as Ruth Rogen
- Randolph Scott as Grant Wilson
- H. B. Warner as Dr. Carl Houston
- Beryl Mercer as Madam Gourjan
- William Farnum as Nick "Nicky" Hammond
- Willard Robertson as Prison Warden
- George Burr Macannan as Max Schmitt
- Lyman Williams as Ghost of John Courtney

== Production ==
=== Development ===
Production development of Supernatural began around January 1933, with screenwriters Brian Marlow and Harvey Thew completing a screenplay from a story by Garnett Weston. Both Thew and Weston were reported to have attended real séances and interview spiritualists while gathering research to write the film.

Supernatural reunited the Halperin brothers with their crew they had on White Zombie. This included writer Weston and cinematographer Arthur Martinelli. Oliver Lodge, a British spiritualist and parapsychologist, was asked to serve as a technical director on the film, but declined.

=== Casting ===
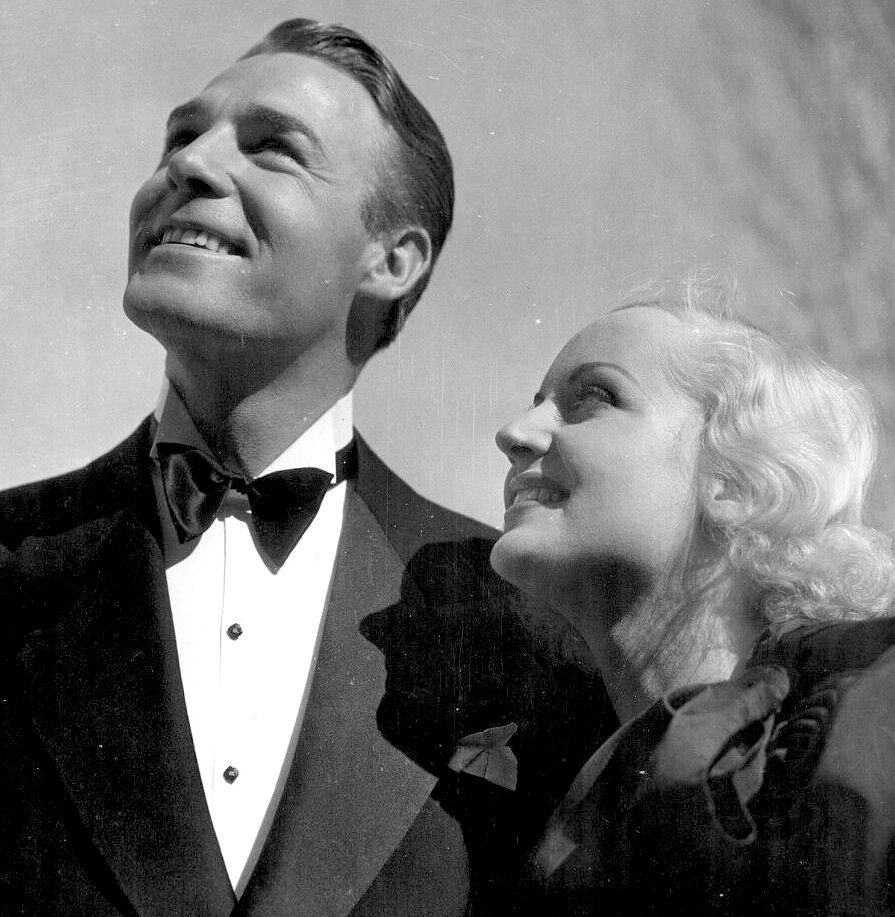
Randolph Scott and Carole Lombard on set of Supernatural, 1933

Madge Bellamy wrote in her autobiography that the Halperin Brothers tried to get her from Paramount Studios for the lead role, but the studio insisted on signing Carole Lombard from Fox Studios. According to Bellamy, Lombard resented her role in the film as "her forte was comedy." Prior to Lombard's casting, Pola Negri was also considered for the lead role, with Ricardo Cortez playing a male lead, though neither were ultimately cast due to scheduling issues.

H. B. Warner was cast in the film after Lombard's attachment, which was announced on February 9, 1933.

=== Filming ===
Principal photography took place on the Paramount Studios lot in Los Angeles, California, commencing on February 20, 1933. Lombard's resentment towards the film often led to arguments on the set with Halperin. The 1933 Long Beach earthquake hit while filming which caused the cast and crew to run from the studio set shrieking in fright.

Lombard completed reshoots for the film on March 20, 1933. According to biographer Mark Vieira, Lombard was unimpressed by Victor Halperin, feeling he was "inept" as a director. Lombard's costumes in the film were designed by Edith Head.

== Release ==
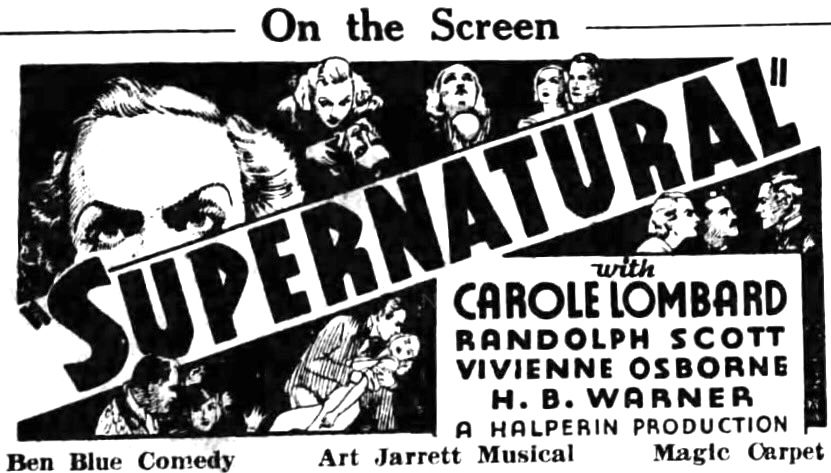
Newspaper advertisement in the Redwood City Tribune, June 1933

Supernatural premiered at the New York Paramount on April 21, 1933. The film played at smaller theaters and even as a second film in a double feature. The film continued to screen throughout the year, opening in May in western cities such as Austin and Salt Lake City before opening in July in Salem, Oregon and Casper, Wyoming. It continued to screen in various U.S. cities through the Christmas season.

Internationally, it premiered in Australia in July 1933 and in London on February 2, 1934.

Due to the film's sexual content, it was rarely aired on television, similar to Island of Lost Souls and Murders in the Zoo.

=== Home media ===
MCA/Universal Home Entertainment released Supernatural on VHS on September 12, 1995. On October 16, 2014, Universal released the film on DVD via their made-on-demand Universal Vault Series. Kino Lorber issued the film on Blu-ray on April 7, 2020.

== Reception ==
=== Box office ===
The film was not as much of a financial success as Halperin's previous film White Zombie. During its week-long theatrical run in New York City, it grossed $23,300, with Variety deeming its box-office performance "poor."

=== Critical response ===
From contemporary reviews, The New York Herald gave the film a positive review stating that the film "doesn't make a bit of sense, but it does supply a lot of unwitting fun." Newsweek praised the film's script, pacing and direction. The New York Times praised the acting of Lombard and Dinehart as well as that the film "succeeds in awakening no little interest in its spooky doings." The Film Daily noted the script which was "not developed in a manner that makes for good entertainment". Variety referred to it negatively as a film that dies within the first half-hour.

The New York Daily News gave the film a favorable assessment, deeming it "the spookiest of the recent pictures designed to expose the spiritualist racket."

In a retrospective review, Kim Newman described the film as a "a fascinating mix of the bizarre and the conventional, affords Carole Lombard one of her strangest roles". Newman added that Randolph Scott was miscast, stating that he "stands around in a tux as Roma's dull love interest" Newman also commented on Garnett Weston's script that was "an idea more impressive in concept than the execution" and that it contained "too many drawing-room chats between more interesting low-life material."

== Legacy ==
Film scholar Edmund Bansak views Supernatural as a precursor to Cat People (1942), as it employs a "female predator whose killing instincts are triggered by sexual passion."

Though it was not regarded as a financial or critical success upon its original release, the film did go on to attain a cult following in the subsequent decades.

== Sources ==
- Bansak, Edmund G. (2003). Fearing the Dark: The Val Lewton Career. Jefferson, North Carolina: McFarland & Company. ISBN 978-0-7864-1709-4.
- Fellner, Chris (2025). The Screen Chills Companion, 1931-1939: Films of the Golden Age of Hollywood Horror. Jefferson, North Carolina: McFarland & Company. ISBN 978-1-476-65411-9.
- Gehring, Wes D. (2003). Carole Lombard, The Hoosier Tornado. Indianapolis, Indiana: Indiana Historical Society Press. ISBN 978-0-871-95167-0.
- Jorgensen, Jay (2010). Edith Head: The Fifty-Year Career of Hollywood's Greatest Costume Designer. Philadelphia, Pennsylvania: Running Press. ISBN 978-0-762-43805-1.
- Rhodes, Gary Don (2015). White Zombie: Anatomy of a Horror Film. Jefferson, North Carolina: McFarland & Company. ISBN 978-0-7864-0988-4.
