= Tomorrow at Seven =

1933 film by Ray Enright

- Original release poster
- Directed by: Ray Enright
- Written by: Ralph Spence
- Produced by: Samuel Zierler
- Starring: Chester Morris; Vivienne Osborne; Frank McHugh; Allen Jenkins; Henry Stephenson; Grant Mitchell
- Cinematography: Charles Edgar Schoenbaum
- Edited by: Rose Loewinger
- Music by: David Broekman
- Production company: Jefferson Pictures Corporation
- Distributed by: RKO Pictures
- Release date: June 2, 1933
- Running time: 62 minutes
- Country: United States
- Languages: English; American Sign Language

Tomorrow at Seven is a 1933 American pre-Code mystery comedy film directed by Ray Enright and written by Ralph Spence. The plot sees a group of people gathered in an old mansion being menaced by a killer known as "The Black Ace".

== Plot ==
A man unveils a valuable painting he picked up for $50,000 and is killed. A card with a large black ace (of spades) is put on his chest. Another “Black Ace” victim. The killer sends his victims a Black Ace card, warning them they are to die and then kills them, his way of taunting the police. Neil Broderick, an author, intends writing a book about him and is on his way to see Thornton Drake to get more information about him. Austin Winters is his secretary and Neil met his daughter Martha on the train, on the way to Chicago.

Drake has just received a Black Ace, with the words: “At seven tomorrow night”, the time he is to be killed. Two plainclothes cops arrive from police headquarters, having had a call, Clancy and Dugan (both incompetents). Martha suggests that they leave for Drake's Louisiana plantation tomorrow morning and be far away from there at seven tomorrow night. Drake agrees and suggests they all go. On the flight, the lights go off for some seconds and when they come on again, Austin Winters is dead without a mark on him.

At the plantation, Clancy ineptly questions the suspects till Neil points out that they are now in another state, so out of their jurisdiction. Neil goes to another room and makes a phone call, then signals to someone outside. After he finishes his call, the line is cut. Meanwhile, one of the pilots has taken off in the plane, leaving the other pilot, Henderson, behind who claims he does not know anything though he was out of the cockpit when Winters was killed.

The coroner finds a letter on the dead man which is to be read if Winters dies. It will reveal the identity of the Black Ace. Clancy starts reading it aloud and unsurprisingly the lights go off and the letter has vanished when the lights are turned on again. People locked in their rooms that night and Neil has a hidden car outside signal to him.

Later that night, the coroner turns up, the real one. Neil goes to Martha's room and asks her what she did with the letter, guessing that she had taken it because was afraid her father might implicate himself with the Black Ace. The letter is gone from where she hid it. In its place are two sheets of plain paper and a Black Ace card. Clancy and Dugan appear and blame Neil. Clancy and Neil at gunpoint go to Drake's room and while Clancy is hurling accusations, there is a groan from next door and they find a dead man there (Henderson). A search of Neil reveals he has a skeleton key so might have been able to enter the dead man's room.

Downstairs, Dugan has been talking to Martha with his back to her, turns and sees she has gone (a mysterious hand reached out for her only moments before). The housekeeper (Mrs Quincy) is seen leading the fake coroner (Jerry Simons) who is carrying Martha. Drake left with Neil threatens him with a gun, demanding Winters’ confession but Neil has signalled Simons (of the Bureau of Criminal Investigations) who disarms Drake who has Winters’ confession implicating him. However, the gardener (Pompey) comes into the room with a gun in his hand and now the villains have the upper hand till there is a knock at just the right moment. Two fights ensue. In trying to kill Simons, Pompey kills Drake with the hidden spike in the walking stick. Pompey is subdued and the two cops arrive to take the credit.

== Cast ==
- Chester Morris as Neil Broderick
- Vivienne Osborne as Martha Winters
- Frank McHugh as Clancy
- Allen Jenkins as Dugan
- Henry Stephenson as Thornton Drake
- Grant Mitchell as Austin Winters
- Charles B. Middleton as Jerry Simons
- Oscar Apfel as Asa Marsden
- Virginia Howell as Mrs. Quincy
- Cornelius Keefe as Henderson
- Edward LeSaint as Coroner
- Gus Robinson as Pompey
- Bud Geary (uncredited) as Co-pilot
