= Frank McHugh =

American actor (1898–1981)

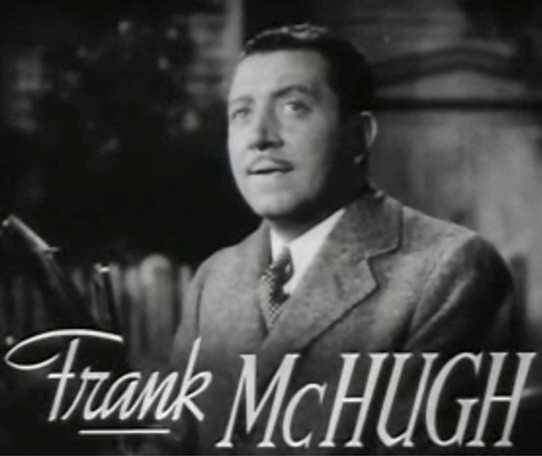
- From trailer for Four Daughters (1938)
- Born: Francis Curry McHugh; May 23, 1898; Homestead, Pennsylvania, U.S.
- Died: September 11, 1981 (aged 83); Greenwich, Connecticut, U.S.
- Occupations: Actor of stage, radio, film, and television
- Years active: 1925–1969
- Spouse: Dorothy Spencer McHugh (m. 1933)
- Children: 3
- Relatives: Matt McHugh (older brother); Kitty McHugh (sister)

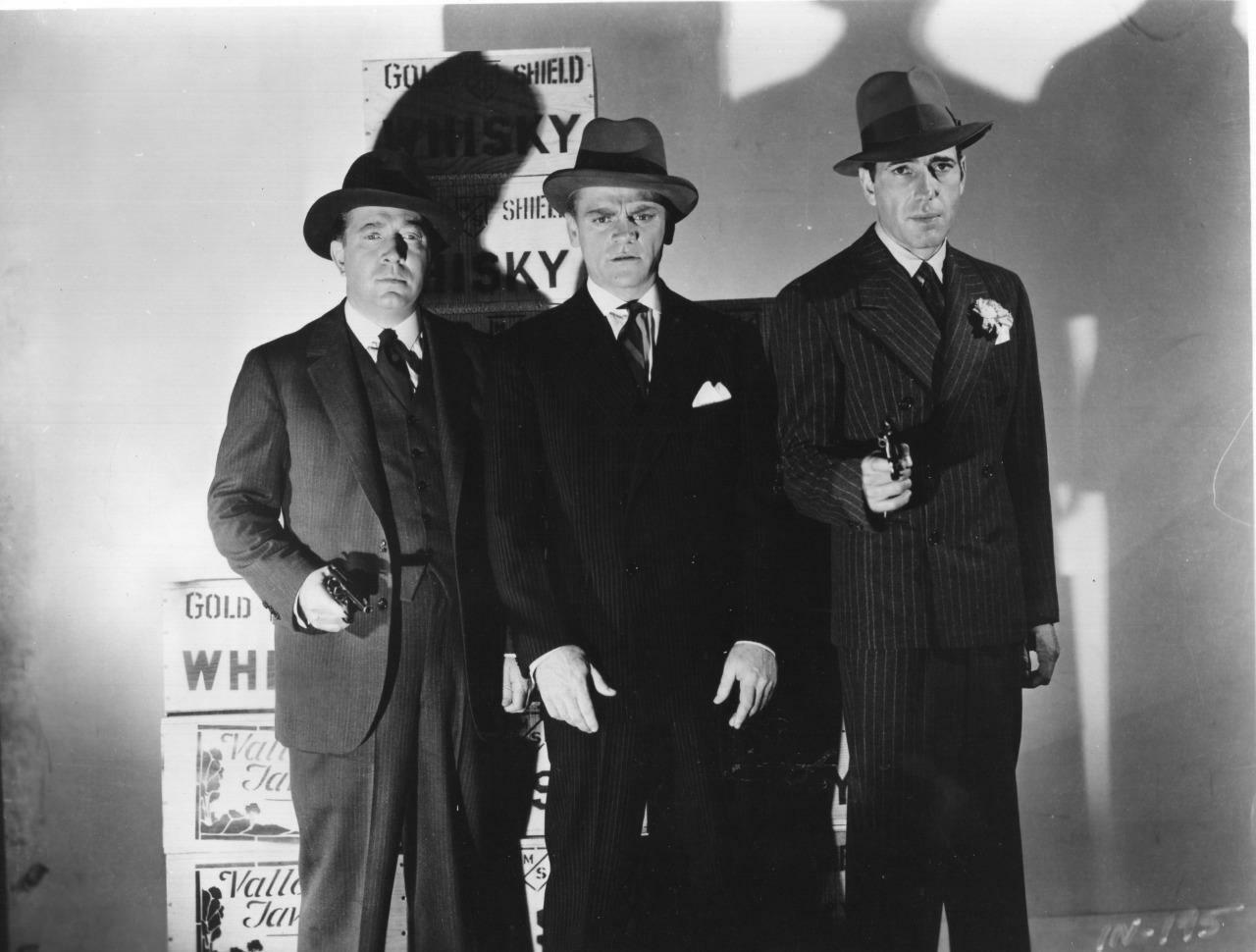
The Roaring Twenties (1939) with McHugh, James Cagney, and Humphrey Bogart

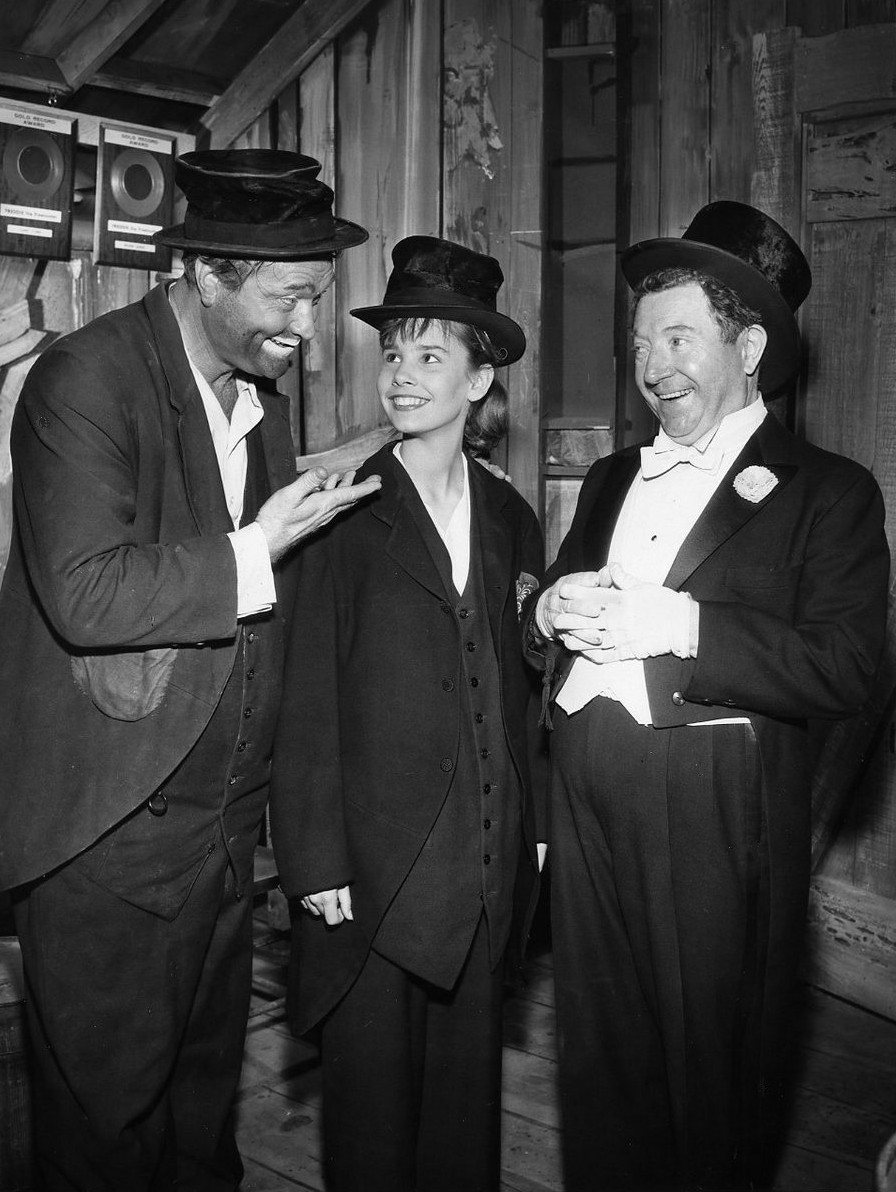
Red Skelton, Carol Sydes and McHugh on The Red Skelton Show, 1959

Francis Curry McHugh (May 23, 1898 – September 11, 1981) was an American stage, radio, film, and television actor.

== Early years ==
Born in Homestead, Pennsylvania, of Irish descent, McHugh came from a theatrical family. His parents, Edward A. "Cutie" McHugh and Katherine Curry "Katie" McHugh, ran the McHugh stock theater company in Braddock, Pennsylvania. As a young child, he performed on stage. His brother Matt and sister Kitty performed in an act with him by the time he was 10 years old, but the family quit the stage around 1930. Another brother, Ed, became a stage manager and agent in New York.

== Career ==
Leaving the family stage company at age 17, McHugh went to Pittsburgh as leading man and stage manager at the Empire Theater there. He spent nine years in stock companies and road troupes before appearing on Broadway.

McHugh debuted on Broadway in The Fall Guy, written by George Abbott and James Gleason in 1925. He also appeared in Show Girl (1929), a musical. In that same year, he made his first film, If Men Played Cards as Women Do, a short produced by Paramount. First National Pictures hired him as a contract player in January 1930.

From 1954 to 1956, he starred in the radio program Hotel For Pets.

From 1964 to 1965, he played Willie Walters, a live-in handyman in the 27-episode ABC sitcom The Bing Crosby Show, which reunited him once again onscreen with Bing Crosby. The show also co-starred Beverly Garland. McHugh's last feature-film role was as a comical "sea captain" in the 1967 Elvis Presley caper film Easy Come, Easy Go. McHugh's last television appearance was as handyman Charlie Wingate in "The Fix-It Man", an episode of CBS's Lancer Western series.

On radio, McHugh had the role of Fairchild Finnegan in Phone Again, Finnegan (1946–1947). He also co-starred in Hotel for Pets (1954–1956).

McHugh belonged to a group of friends, known in Hollywood as the "Irish Mafia", that included his close friends James Cagney, Pat O’Brien, and Spencer Tracy, as well as fellow actors Allen Jenkins, Ralph Bellamy, Frank Morgan, and Lynne Overman.

== World War II ==
During World War II, McHugh joined the Hollywood Victory Caravan, a group that included 21 stars traveling around the country on a special train, performing in several cities over the course of three weeks in 1942 to raise money for the Army and Navy Relief Society. He followed that with a USO tour of England, appearing in the American Variety Show with Al Jolson, Merle Oberon, Patricia Morison, and Allen Jenkins.

McHugh returned to Europe with a USO show created by him, McHugh’s Revue, which toured France, Holland, Belgium, and Germany in November and December of 1944. McHugh, four beautiful girls (actresses Mary Brian, June Clyde, Charlotte Greer, and Nina Nova) and piano-player Eddie Eisman toured the front line, entertaining and meeting the troops. The McHugh papers at the New York Public Library include many accounts of the tour. For his work with the USO, McHugh received a citation "for exceptionally meritorious service while working as a member of an entertainment unit" from the U.S. Army, signed by Major General Raymond S. McLain. In a 1945 letter to McHugh and his troupe, McLain wrote:

I want to make of record what I was glad to say to each of you when you left and what many of the command said to you then and what they have said to me since — "That your show was like an oasis in this desert of hardship and suffering". It reminded us what a vital factor a bit of entertainment is in this business where boredom is almost as difficult to bear as the hardships of the campaign. Your show was sparkling, and left a refreshing atmosphere in the spirit of many battle weary soldiers.

== Personal life and death ==
McHugh was married to Dorothy McHugh (née Spencer) from 1933 until his death. They had three children.

On September 11, 1981, McHugh died in Greenwich Hospital in Greenwich, Connecticut, at age 83.

== Filmography ==
Year	Film	Role	Director	Notes
1929	If Men Played Cards as Women Do	3rd Card Player		Short film
1930	The Dawn Patrol	Flaherty	Howard Hawks	
1930	Top Speed	Tad Jordan	Mervyn LeRoy	
1930	Bright Lights	A. Hamilton Fish, a reporter	Michael Curtiz	
1930	College Lovers	Speed Haskins	John G. Adolfi	
1930	The Widow from Chicago	Slug O'Donnell	Edward F. Cline	
1930	Going Wild	'Ricky' Freeman	William A. Seiter	
1931	Kiss Me Again	Francois	William A. Seiter	
1931	Millie	John Holmes	John Francis Dillon	
1931	The Front Page	McCue	Lewis Milestone	
1931	Up for Murder	Collins	Monta Bell	
1931	Men of the Sky	Oscar	Alfred E. Green	
1931	That's News to Me			Short film
1931	Traveling Husbands	Pinkie	Charles Kerr (assistant)	
1931	The Hot Spot	Peter Burke		Short film
1931	The Great Junction Hotel	Peeping Tom	William Beaudine	
1931	Bad Company	Doc	Tay Garnett	
1931	The Big Scoop		Harry Sweet	Short film
1931	Corsair	'Chub' Hopping	Roland West	
1931	The Wide Open Spaces	Matt	Arthur Rosson	
1932	Union Depot	The Drunk	Alfred E. Green	
1932	High Pressure	Mike Donahey	Mervyn LeRoy	
1932	Extra! Extra!		Harry Sweet	Short film
1932	The Crowd Roars	Spud Connors	Howard Hawks	
1932	The Strange Love of Molly Louvain	Skeets	Michael Curtiz	
1932	The Dark Horse	Joe	Alfred E. Green	
1932	Blessed Event	Reilly	Roy Del Ruth	
1932	Life Begins	Ringer Banks	James Flood	
1932	One Way Passage	Skippy	Tay Garnett	
1933	Parachute Jumper	Toodles Cooper	Alfred E. Green	
1933	Mystery of the Wax Museum	Jim	Michael Curtiz	
1933	Grand Slam	Philip 'Speed' McCann	Alfred E. Green	
1933	The Telegraph Trail	Corporal Tippy	Tenny Wright	
1933	Private Jones	'Greasy'	Russell Mack	
1933	Elmer, the Great	Healy High-Hips	Mervyn LeRoy	
1933	Lilly Turner	David 'Dave' Dixon	William A. Wellman	
1933	Ex-Lady	Hugo Van Hugh	Robert Florey	
1933	Hold Me Tight	Billy	David Butler	
1933	Tomorrow at Seven	Clancy	Ray Enright	
1933	Professional Sweetheart	Speed Dennis	William A. Seiter	
1933	Footlight Parade	Francis	Busby Berkeley (musical numbers)	
1933	Havana Widows	Duffy	Ray Enright	
1933	Son of a Sailor	'Gaga'	Lloyd Bacon	
1933	The House on 56th Street	Chester Hunt	Robert Florey	
1933	Convention City	Will Goodwin	Archie Mayo	
1934	Not Tonight, Josephine	Napoleon		
1934	Fashions of 1934	Snap	William Dieterle	
1934	Heat Lightning	Frank	Mervyn LeRoy	
1934	Merry Wives of Reno	Al	H. Bruce Humberstone	
1934	Let's Be Ritzy	Bill Damroy Robert	Edward Ludwig	
1934	Smarty	George Lancaster	Robert Florey	
1934	Return of the Terror	Joe Hastings	Howard Bretherton	
1934	Here Comes the Navy	Droopy Mullins	Lloyd Bacon	
1934	Happiness Ahead	Tom	Mervyn LeRoy	
1934	6 Day Bike Rider	Clinton Hemmings	Lloyd Bacon	
1935	Maybe It's Love	Willy Sands	William C. McGann	
1935	Devil Dogs of the Air	Crash Kelly	Lloyd Bacon	
1935	Gold Diggers of 1935	Humbolt Prentiss	Busby Berkeley	
1935	The Irish in Us	Mike O'Hara	Lloyd Bacon	
1935	Page Miss Glory	Ed Olson	Mervyn LeRoy	
1935	A Midsummer Night's Dream	Quince - the Carpenter		
1935	Stars Over Broadway	Offkey Cramer	William Keighley	
1936	Freshman Love	Coach Hammond	William McGann	
1936	Moonlight Murder	William	Edwin L. Marin	
1936	Snowed Under	Orlando Rowe	Ray Enright	
1936	Bullets or Ballots	Herman McCloskey	William Keighley	
1936	Stage Struck	Sid	Busby Berkeley	
1936	Three Men on a Horse	Erwin Trowbridge	Mervyn LeRoy (uncredited)	
1937	Ever Since Eve	'Mabel' DeCraven	Lloyd Bacon	
1937	Marry the Girl	David 'Party' Partridge	William C. McGann	
1937	Mr. Dodd Takes the Air	'Sniffer' Sears	Alfred E. Green	
1937	Submarine D-1	'Lucky'	Lloyd Bacon	
1938	Swing Your Lady	Popeye	Ray Enright	
1938	He Couldn't Say No	Lambert T. Hunkins	Lewis Seiler	
1938	Little Miss Thoroughbred	Todd Harrington	John Farrow	
1938	Four Daughters	Ben Crowley	Michael Curtiz	
1938	Boy Meets Girl	Rossetti	Lloyd Bacon	
1938	Valley of the Giants	'Fingers' McCarthy	William Keighley	
1939	Wings of the Navy	Scat Allen	Lloyd Bacon	
1939	Dodge City	Joe Clemens	Michael Curtiz	
1939	Daughters Courageous	George	Michael Curtiz	
1939	Indianapolis Speedway	'Spud' Connors	Lloyd Bacon	
1939	Dust Be My Destiny	Caruthers	Lewis Seiler	
1939	On Your Toes	Paddy Reilly		
1939	The Roaring Twenties	Danny Green	Raoul Walsh	
1939	Four Wives	Ben Crowley	Michael Curtiz	
1940	The Fighting 69th	'Crepe Hanger' Burke	William Keighley	
1940	Alex in Wonderland	Narrator (voice, uncredited)		
1940	Virginia City	Mr. Upjohn	Michael Curtiz	
1940	'Til We Meet Again	Rockingham T. Rockingham	William K. Howard	
1940	I Love You Again	'Doc' Ryan	W.S. Van Dyke	
1940	City for Conquest	'Mutt'	Jean Negulesco (uncredited)	
1941	Four Mothers	Ben Crowley	William Keighley	
1941	Back Street	Ed Porter	Robert Stevenson	
1941	Manpower	Omaha	Raoul Walsh	
1942	All Through the Night	Barney	Vincent Sherman	
1942	Her Cardboard Lover	Chappie Champagne	George Cukor	
1944	Going My Way	Father Timothy O'Dowd	Leo McCarey	
1944	Marine Raiders	Sgt. Louis Leary	Robert Wise (additional scenes)	
1944	Bowery to Broadway	Joe Kirby	Charles Lamont	
1945	A Medal for Benny	Edgar Lovekin	Irving Pichel	
1945	State Fair	McGee	Walter Lang	
1946	The Hoodlum Saint	Three Finger	Norman Taurog	
1946	The Runaround	Wally Quayle	Charles Lamont	
1946	Little Miss Big	Charlie Bryan	Erle C. Kenton	
1947	Easy Come Easy Go	Carey	John Farrow	
1947	Carnegie Hall	John Donovan	Edgar G. Ulmer	
1948	The Velvet Touch	Ernie Boyle	Jack Gage	
1949	Mighty Joe Young	Windy	Ernest B. Schoedsack	
1949	Miss Grant Takes Richmond	Mr. Kilcoyne	Lloyd Bacon	
1950	Paid in Full	Ben	William Dieterle	
1950	The Tougher They Come	Gig Rafferty	Ray Nazarro	
1952	The Pace That Thrills	Rocket Anderson	Leon Barsha	
1952	My Son John	Father O'Dowd	Leo McCarey	
1953	It Happens Every Thursday	Fred Hawley	Joseph Pevney	
1953	A Lion Is in the Streets	Frank Rector	Raoul Walsh	
1954	There's No Business Like Show Business	Eddie Dugan	Walter Lang	
1958	The Last Hurrah	Festus Garvey	John Ford	
1959	Say One for Me	Jim Dugan	Frank Tashlin	
1959	Career	Charley Gallagher	Joseph Anthony	
1961	The Spiral Staircase	Constable Williams		
1963	Inside Danny Baker	Mr. Johansen		TV Pilot
1964	A Tiger Walks	Bill Watkins	Norman Tokar	
1967	Easy Come, Easy Go	Captain Jack	John Rich	

Short subjects as himself:

- An Intimate Dinner in Celebration of Warner Bros. Silver Jubilee (1930)
- Hollywood Newsreel (1934) (uncredited)
- A Dream Comes True (1935)
- Screen Snapshots Series 15, No. 3 (1935)
- Screen Snapshots Series 16, No. 1 (1936)
- A Day at Santa Anita (1937)
- Sunday Night at the Trocadero (1937)
- Breakdowns of 1938 (1938)
