= Two Kinds of Women (1932 film) =

1932 film

- Directed by: William C. deMille
- Screenplay by: Benjamin Glazer; Robert E. Sherwood (play)
- Starring: Miriam Hopkins; Phillips Holmes; Irving Pichel; Wynne Gibson; James Crane; Stanley Fields; Vivienne Osborne
- Cinematography: Karl Struss
- Music by: Rudolph G. Kopp; John Leipold
- Production company: Paramount Pictures
- Distributed by: Paramount Pictures
- Release date: January 16, 1932
- Running time: 75 minutes
- Country: United States
- Language: English

Two Kinds of Women is a 1932 American pre-Code drama film directed by William C. deMille, written by Benjamin Glazer, adapted from the play by Robert E. Sherwood, and starring Miriam Hopkins, Phillips Holmes, Irving Pichel, Wynne Gibson, Stanley Fields and Vivienne Osborne. It was released on January 16, 1932, by Paramount Pictures.

== Cast ==
- Miriam Hopkins as Emma Krull
- Phillips Holmes as Joseph Gresham Jr.
- Irving Pichel as Senator Krull
- Wynne Gibson as Phyllis Adrian
- Stanley Fields as Harry Glassman
- Vivienne Osborne as Helen
- Stuart Erwin as Hauser
- Josephine Dunn as Clarissa Smith
- Robert Emmett O'Connor as Tim

== Critical Response ==
George Blaisdell of International Photographer praised the actors and stated that "Two Kinds of Women is worth traveling a distance to see."
