= A Medal for Benny =

1945 film by Irving Pichel

- Lobby card
- Directed by: Irving Pichel
- Screenplay by: Frank Butler; Jack Wagner (additional dialogue)
- Story by: John Steinbeck; Jack Wagner
- Starring: Dorothy Lamour; Arturo de Córdova; J. Carrol Naish
- Cinematography: Lionel Lindon
- Edited by: Arthur P. Schmidt
- Music by: Victor Young
- Production company: Paramount Pictures
- Distributed by: Paramount Pictures
- Release date: April 16, 1945 (United States)
- Running time: 77 minutes
- Country: United States
- Language: English

A Medal for Benny is a 1945 American drama film directed by Irving Pichel. The story was conceived by writer Jack Wagner, who enlisted his long-time friend John Steinbeck to help him put it into script form. The film was released by Paramount Pictures. The film is also known as Benny's Medal.

== Plot ==
Benny Martin leaves his small town of Pantera and joins the Army after getting in trouble with the police. While he is away, his girlfriend (Lolita) is romanced by Joe. Although she has not heard from Benny in months, she refuses Joe's advances, wanting to stay loyal to Benny. She eventually falls for Joe and agrees to marry him but then finds out that Benny was killed in action and has been awarded the Medal of Honor posthumously. Meanwhile, the Pantera mayor plans a rally for the medal presentation to Benny's father and intends to use a beautiful house for the event so as not to embarrass the town by having the medal presented at the modest Martin residence. However, Benny's father Charley, refuses to go along with the ruse and instead the medal ceremony takes place at his home. In his speech, Charley says that Benny will live on in his and Lolita's hearts. Lolita then tells Joe that she cannot marry him yet, because it might break Charley's heart.

== Cast ==
- Dorothy Lamour as Lolita Sierra
- Arturo de Córdova as Joe Morales
- J. Carrol Naish as Charley Martin
- Mikhail Rasumny as Raphael Catalina
- Fernando Alvarado as Chito Sierra
- Charles Dingle as Zach Mibbe
- Frank McHugh as Edgar Lovekin
- Rosita Moreno as Toodles Castro
- Douglass Dumbrille as General
- Grant Mitchell as Mayor of Pantera
- Max Wagner as Jake

== Accolades ==
=== Awards ===
- Golden Globe Award for Best Supporting Actor (J. Carrol Naish)

=== Nominations ===
- Academy Award for Best Supporting Actor (J. Carrol Naish)
- Academy Award for Best Story (John Steinbeck & Jack Wagner)
