= The Devil's in Love =

1933 film

- Theatrical release poster
- Directed by: William Dieterle
- Screenplay by: Howard Estabrook
- Story by: Harry Hervey
- Starring: Victor Jory; Loretta Young; Vivienne Osborne; David Manners; C. Henry Gordon; Herbert Mundin
- Cinematography: Hal Mohr
- Edited by: Ralph Dietrich
- Music by: J.S. Zamecnik
- Production company: Fox Film Corporation
- Distributed by: Fox Film Corporation
- Release date: July 21, 1933
- Running time: 70 minutes
- Country: United States
- Language: English

The Devil's in Love (also known as Consul of the Damned) is a 1933 American pre-Code drama film directed by William Dieterle and written by Howard Estabrook. The film stars Victor Jory, Loretta Young, Vivienne Osborne, David Manners, C. Henry Gordon and Herbert Mundin. The film was released on July 21, 1933, by Fox Film Corporation.

== Cast ==
- Victor Jory as Dr. Andre Morand / Paul Vernay
- Loretta Young as Margot Lesesne
- Vivienne Osborne as Rena Corday
- David Manners as Captain Jean Fabien
- C. Henry Gordon as Captain Radak
- Herbert Mundin as Bimpy
- Émile Chautard as Father Carmion
- J. Carrol Naish as Salazar

Among the uncredited actors appearing are Bela Lugosi and Akim Tamiroff
