= The Famous Ferguson Case =

1932 film

- Titular screenshot
- Directed by: Lloyd Bacon
- Written by: Harvey F. Thew; Courtney Terrett; Granville Moore
- Starring: Joan Blondell; Grant Mitchell; Vivienne Osborne
- Cinematography: Devereaux Jennings
- Edited by: Howard Bretherton
- Music by: Bernhard Kaun
- Production company: First National Pictures
- Distributed by: Warner Bros. Pictures
- Release date: May 14, 1932
- Running time: 74 minutes
- Country: United States
- Language: English

The Famous Ferguson Case is a 1932 American pre-Code crime film starring Joan Blondell and directed by Lloyd Bacon. Grant Mitchell and Vivienne Osborne appear in support.

== Plot ==
In the small upstate New York town of Cornwall, Vivian Osborne is dallying with Jud Brooks. Vivian, young and saucy, is married to an elderly but adoring banker, whose business is in far off New York City. Brooks is an up-and-coming teller at the local bank, upon which the town's giant factory and financial stability depend.

Vivian and Jud are in her expensive convertible at the local train station, being affectionate in public, while Jud waits to pick up a payroll for the factory. When he goes to collect it, George Ferguson disembarks, sees his wife in her car, and heartily greets her. She covers by saying she was just there to see who got off the train.

Also there is cub reporter for the local Courier Bruce Foster, scouring for news. He's a go-getter, whose typist-assistant reporter is his girlfriend, Toni Martin. She is pushing him to move to the big city and make big money like all the glamorous high-profile reporters he adores. He'd rather stay in town, but still has dreams.

That night there is a commotion at the Ferguson mansion. When the sheriff and Brown arrive they find George shot dead and Vivian bound and gagged. Giant headlines reverberate through New York City, and an invasion of its most aggressive reporters arrive. They are divided into two camps: the boring "responsible" newsmen, who only report the facts; and the flashy "tabloid" types that goose stories (and make them up if they have to).

The leader of the swashbucklers is Bob Parks, who immediately wraps Foster around his finger and makes a play for Toni. She is a bit green, but all-too receptive. Hard as nails Maizie Dickson arrives in town, the only female reporter in the gang. She immediately sees what Parks is up to and attempts to warn Toni, to no avail.

With little more to go on to fuel their fires for more sensational storylines, the top movers among the "yellow journalists" start manipulating the local D.A., driving him towards rash actions. He indicts Vivian for the murder, who continues to keep Jud out of it. They then harass Jud's wife, who claims to know nothing and collapses and tumbles down a flight of stairs when she's badgered that her husband is in a hot and heavy affair with Mrs. Ferguson. In advanced pregnancy, she is hospitalized in serious condition.

The zealots still persist, coaching the D.A. on courtroom hysterics guaranteed to earn not just a conviction but the death penalty for Vivian. All the while Toni becomes round-heeled with Parks, to the heartbreak of Foster. Things get so bad the dean of the straight-laced reporters, Martin Collins, crashes the party the sensationalists are holding to celebrate their success, and lectures them sternly on journalistic ethics.

Further dampening the mood, news comes that Mrs. Brooks has died from her ails.

Then the cries of "Extra-extra!" from a newsboy ring out, announcing that while everyone else was preoccupied with events in Cornwall Foster had done true investigative reporter work, found the real killers of Ferguson in Boston, sent the story to all the major papers, and in the process set up the vacation of Vivian Ferguson's trial.

All the sensationlalists immediately realize not only their jobs but their careers are at stake. Pessimism reigns.

Shortly after a haggard Jud appears, looking for Parks. He drags him out of the room and outside the hotel, Parks believing he has a gun and intends to kill him. Instead, Jud gives the city slicker a thorough beating, and tells the sheriff when the lawman appears he'll be at his home if anyone wants to charge him. Clearly no-one will, including Parks.

Collins offers Foster a job with his highly respected paper. Foster turns it down. He likes what he does, where he does it, and has seen enough of big city reporting already for one linfetime.

The next morning the train for New York City leaves, with all the reporters on it. Except one - Maizie, the jilted paramour of Parks and disillusioned big city reporter, who waves goodbye to her former colleagues as Toni comes running, calling for Parks and jumping just in time on the last car.

Foster and Maizie leave arm-in-arm together, Maizie pointing out the new vacancy at the Courier and Foster enthusiastically offering the job to her.

== Cast ==
- Joan Blondell as Maizie Dickson
- Grant Mitchell as Martin Collins
- Vivienne Osborne as Mrs. Marcia Ferguson
- Adrienne Dore as Antoinette 'Toni' Martin
- Tom Brown as Bruce Foster
- Kenneth Thomson as Bob Parks
- Leslie Fenton as Perrin
- Oscar Apfel as Mr. Brooks
- Walter Miller as Cedric Works
- Purnell Pratt as George M. Ferguson
- Willard Robertson as Sheriff
- George Meeker as Jigger Bolton
- Russell Hopton as Rusty Callahan
- George 'Spanky' McFarland as Newsboy
- Leon Ames as Judd Brooks
- J. Carrol Naish as Claude Wright
- William Burress as Dad Sipes
- Clarence Wilson as County Attorney
- Russell Simpson as Banker Craig
