= The Phantom Broadcast =

1933 film directed by Phil Rosen

- Directed by: Phil Rosen
- Written by: Tristram Tupper
- Produced by: William T. Lackey; Trem Carr
- Starring: Ralph Forbes; Vivienne Osborne; Gail Patrick
- Cinematography: Gilbert Warrenton
- Edited by: Carl Pierson
- Music by: Bernard B. Brown; Norman Spencer
- Production company: Monogram Pictures
- Distributed by: Monogram Pictures
- Release date: March 15, 1933
- Running time: 72 minutes
- Country: United States
- Language: English

The Phantom Broadcast is a 1933 American pre-Code mystery film directed by Phil Rosen and starring Ralph Forbes, Vivienne Osborne and Gail Patrick. It was based on a story by Tristram Tupper entitled Phantom of the Air.

== Plot ==
An arrogant singing radio performer is murdered, apparently by his accompanist who provided the real voice behind his success.

== Cast ==
- Ralph Forbes as Norman Wilder
- Vivienne Osborne as Elsa Evans
- Arnold Gray as Grant Murdock
- Gail Patrick as Laura Hamilton
- Paul Page as Dr. Robert Brooks
- Pauline Garon as Nancy
- Guinn 'Big Boy' Williams as Sandy Higgins
- Rockliffe Fellowes as Joe Maestro
- Harland Tucker as Program Manager
- Carl Miller as Lefty
- Mary MacLaren as Beth
- George Nash as Artist
- Althea Henley as Model
- George 'Gabby' Hayes as Police Lieutenant
- Louise Beavers as Penny
- Kit Guard as Thug
- Henry Hall as Thornton - Radio Station Manager
- Dick Rush as Policeman

== Bibliography ==
- Bradley, Edwin M. Unsung Hollywood Musicals of the Golden Era: 50 Overlooked Films and Their Stars, 1929–1939. McFarland, 2016.
