= The Crime Nobody Saw =

1937 film by Charles Barton

- Theatrical release poster
- Directed by: Charles Barton
- Screenplay by: Bertram Millhauser
- Produced by: William LeBaron
- Starring: Lew Ayres; Ruth Coleman; Eugene Pallette; Benny Baker; Vivienne Osborne; Colin Tapley; Howard Hickman
- Cinematography: James Smith
- Edited by: Richard C. Currier
- Music by: Harry Fischbeck
- Production company: Paramount Pictures
- Distributed by: Paramount Pictures
- Release date: March 12, 1937
- Running time: 63 minutes
- Country: United States
- Language: English

The Crime Nobody Saw is a 1937 American comedy film directed by Charles Barton and written by Bertram Millhauser. The film stars Lew Ayres, Ruth Coleman, Eugene Pallette, Benny Baker, Vivienne Osborne, Colin Tapley and Howard Hickman. The film was released on March 12, 1937, by Paramount Pictures.

== Plot ==
The plot follows play-authors, Horace Dryden, Nick Milburn and "Babe" Lawton, who are in an apartment seeking inspiration, when suddenly an intoxicated man enters and collapses on the floor. The man has $15,000 with him, and things go bad when they find that the man was murdered.

== Cast ==
- Lew Ayres as Nick Milburn
- Ruth Coleman as Kay Mallory
- Eugene Pallette as 'Babe' Lawton
- Benny Baker as Horace Dryden
- Vivienne Osborne as Suzanne Duval
- Colin Tapley as Dr. Randolph Brooks
- Howard Hickman as Robert Mallory
- Robert Emmett O'Connor as Officer Tim Harrigan
- Jed Prouty as William Underhill
- Hattie McDaniel as Ambrosia
- Ferdinand Gottschalk as John Atherton
- Ellen Drew as Secretary
