= Grant Mitchell (actor) =

American actor (1874–1957)

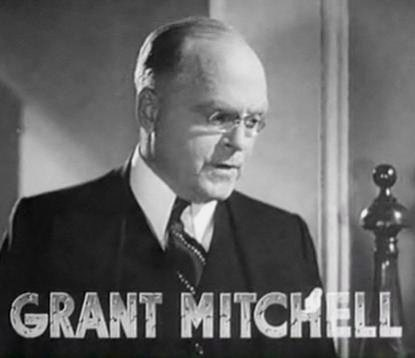
- Trailer for The Garden Murder Case (1936)
- Born: John Grant Mitchell, Jr. June 17, 1874; Columbus, Ohio, U.S.
- Died: May 1, 1957 (aged 82); Los Angeles, California, U.S.
- Occupation: Actor
- Years active: 1902–1948

John Grant Mitchell Jr. (June 17, 1874 – May 1, 1957) was an American actor. He appeared on Broadway from 1902 to 1939 and appeared in more than 125 films between 1930 and 1948.

== Early years ==
Mitchell was born John Grant Mitchell Jr. on June 17, 1874, in Columbus, Ohio, the only son of American Civil War general John G. Mitchell. His paternal grandmother, Fanny Arabella Hayes, was the sister of President Rutherford B. Hayes. He attended Yale University, where he served as feature editor of campus humor magazine The Yale Record.

Like his father, he became an attorney, graduating from the Harvard Law School. However, by his mid-to-late 20s, he tired of his legal practice and turned a long term dream into a reality by becoming an actor on Broadway. He played lead roles in plays such as It Pays to Advertise, The Whole Town's Talking, The Champion, and The Baby Cyclone.

Mitchell was a brother of the Delta Kappa Epsilon fraternity (Phi chapter).

== Stage ==
Mitchell's Broadway credits include Tide Rising (1936), All the King's Men (1928), One of the Family (1925), Spooks (1925), The Habitual Husband (1924), The Whole Town's Talking (1923), The School for Scandal (1923), Kempy (1921), The Hero (1920), The Champion (1920), and A Tailor-Made Man (1917).

== Film ==
In film, Mitchell initially made an appearance in 1916 and one or two other silents amidst his theater work, but Mitchell's screen career really took off with the advent of sound. His first starring role was in the film Man to Man (1930) from director Allan Dwan. Grant Michell often played the father of the heroine, businessmen, bank clerks or school principals. He usually played supporting characters, but also had a rare lead role in the B film comedy Father Is a Prince (1940).

He made many notable appearances in high-profile films such as Dinner At Eight (1933 David O. Selznick film), A Midsummer Night's Dream (1935, as Egeus), Mr. Smith Goes to Washington (1939, as a Washington senator), The Man Who Came to Dinner (1942, as the Stanley family's father), and Arsenic and Old Lace (1944, as Cary Grant's father-in-law Reverend Harper). He was also notable as Georges Clemenceau in the Oscar-winning film biography The Life of Emile Zola (1937). In John Ford's film classic The Grapes of Wrath (1940), based on John Steinbeck's book, Mitchell played the friendly caretaker of a migrant campground.

== Personal life and death ==
Grant Mitchell retired from the film business in 1948 and died a bachelor on May 1, 1957. He was buried next to his father, mother, and stepmother at Green Lawn Cemetery in Columbus, Ohio.

== Complete filmography ==
- The Misleading Lady (1916) as Stephen Weatherbee
- Radio-Mania (1922) as Arthur Wyman
- Man to Man (1930) as John Martin Bolton - Barber
- The Star Witness (1931) as Pa Leeds
- The Famous Ferguson Case (1932) as Martin Collins
- Week-End Marriage (1932) as Doctor
- Big City Blues (1932) as Station Agent
- A Successful Calamity (1932) as Conners, Wilton's Butler
- Three on a Match (1932) as Mr. Gilmore
- If I Had a Million (1932) as Prison Priest (uncredited)
- No Man of Her Own (1932) as Charlie Vane
- 20,000 Years in Sing Sing (1932) as Tester of Convicts' IQ (uncredited)
- Our Betters (1933) as Thorton Clay
- He Learned About Women (1933) as Appleby
- Central Airport (1933) as Mr. Blaine
- Lilly Turner (1933) as Dr. Hawley
- Tomorrow at Seven (1933) as Austin Winters
- Heroes for Sale (1933) as George Gibson
- I Love That Man (1933) as Dr. Crittenden - Dentist
- The Stranger's Return (1933) as Allen Redfield
- Dinner at Eight (1933) as Ed Loomis
- Wild Boys of the Road (1933) as Mr. James Smith
- Saturday's Millions (1933) as Ezra Fowler
- Dancing Lady (1933) as Jasper Bradley, Sr.
- Shadows of Sing Sing (1933) as Joe Martel
- King for a Night (1933) as Rev. John Williams
- Convention City (1933) as J. B. Honeywell
- The Poor Rich (1934) as Tom Hopkins
- The Show-Off (1934) as Mr. "Pa"
- Twenty Million Sweethearts (1934) as Chester A. Sharpe
- We're Rich Again (1934) as Wilbur Page
- The Cat's-Paw (1934) as Silk Hat McGee
- One Exciting Adventure (1934) as Fussli
- The Case of the Howling Dog (1934) as Claude Drumm
- Gridiron Flash (1934) as Howard Smith
- 365 Nights in Hollywood (1934) as J. Walter Delmar
- The Secret Bride (1934) as Willis Martin
- One More Spring (1935) as Mr. Sheridan
- Gold Diggers of 1935 (1935) as Louis Lamson
- Straight from the Heart (1935) as Austin
- Traveling Saleslady (1935) as Rufus Twitchell
- Men Without Names (1935) as Andrew Webster
- Broadway Gondolier (1935) as E. V. Richards, Radio Producer
- Redheads on Parade (1935) (uncredited)
- A Midsummer Night's Dream (1935) as Egeus
- It's in the Air (1935) as W. R. Gridley
- In Person (1935) as Judge Thaddeus Parks
- Seven Keys to Baldpate (1935) as Thomas Hayden
- The Garden Murder Case (1936) as Inspector Markham
- Her Master's Voice (1936) as Horace J. Twilling
- Next Time We Love (1936) as Michael Jennings
- Moonlight Murder (1936) as Dr. Adams
- The Ex-Mrs. Bradford (1936) as John Sumers
- Parole! (1936) as Marty Crawford
- My American Wife (1936) as Robert Cantillon
- Piccadilly Jim (1936) as Herbert Pitt
- The Devil Is a Sissy (1936) as Paul Krumpp
- The Life of Emile Zola (1937) as Georges Clemenceau
- Music for Madame (1937) as District Attorney Ernest Robinson
- The Last Gangster (1937) as Warden
- First Lady (1937) as Ellsworth T. Banning
- Hollywood Hotel (1937) as B. L. Baulkin
- Lady Behave! (1937) as Burton Williams
- Women Are Like That (1938) as Mr. Snell
- Reformatory (1938) as Arnold Frayne
- Youth Takes a Fling (1938) as Duke
- That Certain Age (1938) as Jeweler
- The Headleys at Home (1938) as Ernest Headley
- Peck's Bad Boy with the Circus (1938) as Henry Peck
- Juarez (1939) as Mr. Harris (scenes deleted)
- 6,000 Enemies (1939) as Warden Parkhurst
- Hell's Kitchen (1939) as Krispin
- On Borrowed Time (1939) as Mr. Pilbeam
- The Monroe Doctrine (1939, Short) as John Quincy Adams
- Mr. Smith Goes to Washington (1939) as Senator MacPherson
- The Secret of Dr. Kildare (1939) as John Xerxes Archley
- The Grapes of Wrath (1940) as Caretaker of trailer park
- Castle on the Hudson (1940) as Dr. Ames (uncredited)
- It All Came True (1940) as Mr. Rene Salmon
- Edison, the Man (1940) as Snade
- New Moon (1940) as Governor of New Orleans
- My Love Came Back (1940) as Dr. Knobbe
- We Who Are Young (1940) as Jones
- The Bride Wore Crutches (1941) as E.J. Randall
- Father Is a Prince (1940) as John Bower
- Tobacco Road (1941) as George Payne
- Footsteps in the Dark (1941) as Wellington Carruthers
- The Penalty (1941) as Judge
- The Great Lie (1941) as Joshua Mason
- The Feminine Touch (1941) as Dean Hutchinson
- One Foot in Heaven (1941) as Clayton Potter
- Nothing But the Truth (1941) as Mr. Bishop
- Skylark (1941) as Frederick Vantine
- The Man Who Came to Dinner (1942) as Ernest W. Stanley
- Larceny, Inc. (1942) as Mr. Aspinwall
- Meet the Stewarts (1942) as Mr. Pierce Goodwin
- The Gay Sisters (1942) as Gilbert Wheeler
- Cairo (1942) as O.H.P. Boggs
- Orchestra Wives (1942) as Dr. Ward
- My Sister Eileen (1942) as Walter Sherwood
- The Amazing Mrs. Holliday (1943) as Edgar Holiday
- All by Myself (1943) as J.D. Gibbons
- Dixie (1943) as Mr. Mason
- See Here, Private Hargrove (1944) as Uncle George
- Step Lively (1944) as Dr. Gibbs
- Arsenic and Old Lace (1944) as Reverend Harper
- The Impatient Years (1944) as Hotel Clerk
- Laura (1944) (scenes cut)
- When the Lights Go On Again (1944) as Mr. Arnold Benson
- And Now Tomorrow (1944) as Uncle Wallace
- Bring on the Girls (1945) as Uncle Ralph
- Crime, Inc. (1945) as Wayne Clark
- A Medal for Benny (1945) as Mayor of Pantera
- Wonder Man (1945) as Mr. Wagonseller (uncredited)
- Bedside Manner (1945) as Mr. Pope
- Conflict (1945) as Dr. Grant
- Guest Wife (1945) as House Detective
- Leave Her to Heaven (1945) as Carlson (uncredited)
- Colonel Effingham's Raid (1946) as Maj. Anthony T. Hickock (uncredited)
- Cinderella Jones (1946) (scenes deleted)
- Easy to Wed (1946) as Homer Henshaw
- It Happened on 5th Avenue (1947) as Farrow
- Blondie's Holiday (1947) as Samuel Breckenridge
- Honeymoon (1947) as Congressman Crenshaw
- The Corpse Came C.O.D. (1947) as Mitchell Edwards
- Blondie's Anniversary (1947) as Samuel Breckenridge
- Who Killed Doc Robbin (1948) as Judge (final film role)

== Bibliography ==
- Lehosit, Sean V. (2015). West Columbus. Charleston, S.C.: Arcadia Publishing. ISBN 9781467114639.
