= Two Seconds =

1932 film

- 1932 theatrical poster
- Directed by: Mervyn LeRoy
- Written by: Harvey Thew
- Based on: Two Seconds; 1931 play by Elliott Lester
- Starring: Edward G. Robinson; Vivienne Osborne; Preston Foster
- Cinematography: Sol Polito
- Edited by: Terry Morse (aka Terry O. Morse)
- Music by: W. Franke Harling
- Production company: First National Pictures
- Distributed by: Warner Bros. Pictures
- Release date: May 28, 1932
- Running time: 68 minutes
- Country: United States
- Language: English
- Budget: $310,000
- Box office: $822,000

Two Seconds is a 1932 American pre-Code crime drama film directed by Mervyn LeRoy and starring Edward G. Robinson, Vivienne Osborne and Preston Foster. It was based on a successful Broadway play of the same name by Elliott Lester. The title refers to the two seconds it takes the condemned person to die in the electric chair after the executioner throws the switch. Preston Foster reprises the role he played on the Broadway stage.

== Plot ==
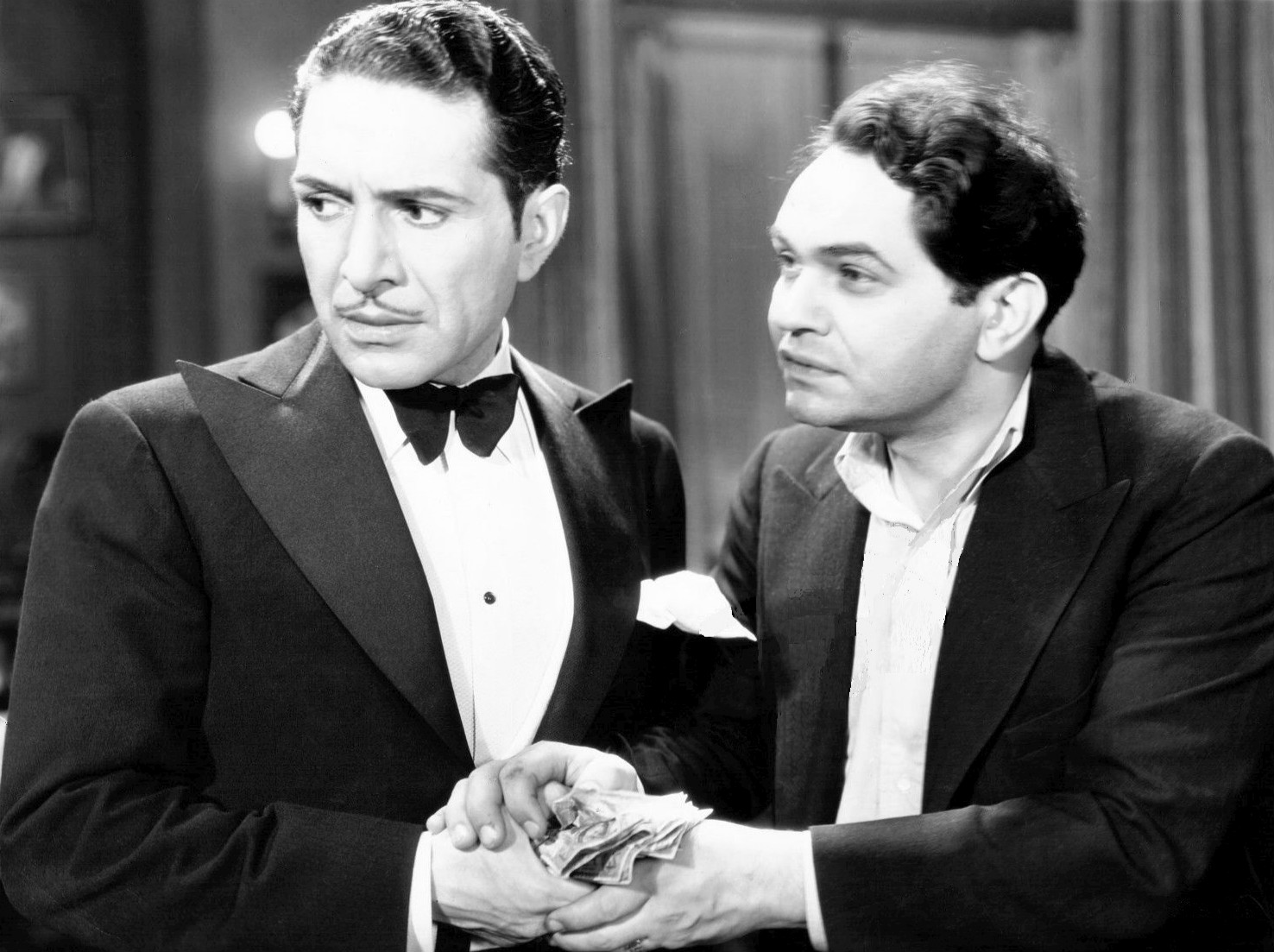
Tony (J. Carrol Naish) and John (Edward G. Robinson) in Two Seconds

As John Allen, a condemned murderer, is led to the electric chair, a witness asks the prison warden how long it takes for the condemned person to die. "A strongly built man like John Allen? It'll take two seconds." The witness remarks, "That'll be the longest two seconds of his life." As the executioner throws the switch, the events that led up to the execution appear in flashback.

John Allen works with his friend and flatmate Bud Clark, as riveters, on the girders of a skyscraper under construction, getting paid $62.50 a week, "more than a college professor." Bud is engaged to be married, and tries to set up a date for John that night, but John expresses disinterest because Bud keeps setting John up with "firewagons", his term for fat girls. Bud and John go out on the town after Bud wins $38 on the horses. John sees that the girl that Bud's girl has brought along for him to double date is a "firewagon", so he splits off on his own, going to a taxi dance hall nearby, where he meets dancer Shirley Day. After dancing and talking to Shirley for some time, he indicates that they should talk some more. She suggests that he get a lot so they can talk more, but in the five minutes John is away buying tickets, Shirley has gone off with another customer. That customer gropes her, and Shirley causes a scene, shouting at the customer, "He paid a dime and he thinks that entitles him to privileges." John wades in, punching the customer to the floor. Tony, the dance hall owner, tells them both to get out, firing Shirley. John then takes Shirley for a milk shake.

Earlier, John had said to Shirley that he wanted a woman with educational aspirations: "Ain't no use both of us being dumb." Shirley feigns respectability, telling John that she only works in the dance hall to support her sick parents, who live on a farm in Idaho and that she is educated ("I've got a year of high school, wish I'd have stuck it out"). Shirley pretends to be interested in attending a lecture with him. Later, Bud is remonstrating with John about him having hooked up with "a dance hall dame". Bud suggests that she has aims on John, annoying John. John indicates that he doesn't want to fall out with Bud, trying to get him to like Shirley, but fails to win him over. As John leaves, Bud says more cheerily, "Come home sober and bring me a lollipop."

Instead of taking John to a lecture, Shirley takes him to a speakeasy where she gets him drunk on "tea" (bootleg gin was served in teapots to disguise its true nature, as alcohol was illegal then, due to prohibition). When John protests, she says that they can "catch the second show" of the lecture. John is drunk, bored, and belligerent after the first floor show. He says that Shirley herself shouldn't drink too much. She responds that she has to because of her troubles, confusing the inebriated John. Shirley kisses him, cheering him up greatly. "You know I like that", he says. Shirley responds, "Would you like more?"

Shirley drags John to a Justice of the Peace. John thinks he is still in the speakeasy. He still has a teacup hooked on his finger and is yelling for a waiter to get more drink. The Justice of the Peace says John is too drunk to continue the ceremony, but Shirley bribes him with $10, and indicates that she already has a ring, which she has had for some weeks. When Shirley and a stupefied John return to his apartment, Shirley has a blazing argument with Bud and throws Bud out. As Bud is leaving, Shirley is getting undressed to consummate the marriage somehow, to a drunk John. Bud says to the unconscious John, "You said you'd bring me back a lollipop. You did alright and a red one at that." He flicks a lit cigarette at Shirley's naked back.

Three weeks later, Bud and John are doing their high-rise riveting job, 28 stories up. During a break, they argue about Shirley. Bud berates John for being taken in by a liar. John admits that Shirley has had much of his money for clothes. They argue, John angrily lunges at Bud with a spanner, and Bud falls to his death, shown spinning, screaming as John, flat on his stomach looks over, watching him fall, yelling, "Bud! Bud!"

John is a hunched, nervous, depressed wreck, with Shirley nagging him. Shirley mocks his nervous condition, sneering, mimicking him. She asks him if he's got any insurance. A kindly doctor (Harry Beresford) is called and gives him a tonic. John says that it's his nerves. The doctor says that John's problem is psychological.

Shirley is putting a new dress on, new stockings and going out. John asks where she got them, and when she replies, "Tony", John doesn't like the look and says that she can't go out looking that way as his wife. Shirley indicates that she has credibility now "with the other girls", as she's married, and "there are things a 'missus' can get away with that a 'miss' can't." Lizzie, the cleaning lady (Dorothea Wolbert), tells Shirley that the landlady is after them for the rent. John indicates that they must put this off and pay her later. Lizzie warns that they'll get thrown out. Shirley pulls a clip of money out of her stocking, surprising John. When John asks where she got the money, Shirley again replies, "Tony", and tells him that the money is an "advance." She then tells John that she is trying to get Bud's ex-girlfriend, Annie, whom she met at Bud's funeral, a job at the dance hall. John protests, "You can't make a tramp out of Annie!" Shirley throws a dollar at John as she leaves. "Here's a buck in case you need anything."

John has been betting on horses using techniques of multiple bets ("parlays") used by Tony. The horse racing bookie (Guy Kibbee) arrives at the apartment. John confronts him until the bookie tells him that he won $388. The bookie says, "With that kind of money you can clear a lot of debt." John responds, "I'll clear them ALL off, that's what Bud would have wanted me to do." The bookie is concerned by John's demeanor as the deranged John insists that he only wants $172 of the winning, then rummages in a cupboard to find his teacup, the one he had on his finger when he married Shirley. He throws the teacup on the ground, smashing it and exclaims, "I'm going to be FREE!" John nervously counts out what Shirley got from Tony and enough for a gun.

John then strides off purposively to Tony's dance hall, where he finds Shirley in Tony's arms. John thrusts $162 into the hands of Tony, who doesn't want it, then confronts Shirley. Shirley turns to Tony in panic and says, "Tony he's going to kill me!" John's sweaty, deranged face is shown in closeup: "Yeah, I'm going to kill you. If I don't you're going to go on like this, from Tony to another man, always making yourself cheaper and dirtier." He fires several bullets into Shirley as Tony runs out of the room, howling.

At his trial, John does not put up a defense of any kind. The judge is puzzled by this, saying that he could have suggested a justification or pleaded temporary insanity, and the police officer's testimony would have supported it. But he says that he has no choice but to sentence John to death in the electric chair. In his sentencing statement, John says that he should have been "burned" (electrocuted) when he was at his lowest, a "rat" living off of Shirley, not when he had paid off his debts. He makes a pitiful, deranged allocution statement, pleading, "It isn't fair! It isn't fair to let a rat live and kill a man! It isn't reasonable! It don't make sense! I won't let you do it!"

== Cast ==
- Edward G. Robinson as John Allen
- Vivienne Osborne as Shirley Day
- Guy Kibbee as Bookie
- Preston Foster as Bud Clark
- J. Carrol Naish as Tony
- Frederick Burton as Judge
- Harry Beresford as Doctor
- Dorothea Wolbert as Lizzie, Cleaning Lady
- Berton Churchill as The Warden
- William Janney as College Boy At Execution
- Edward McWade as The Prison Doctor
- Otto Hoffman as S J Peters, Justice of the Peace
- Adrienne Dore as Annie

== Production ==
Mervyn LeRoy said in the 1970s, when talking about the film, that at the time his production team were "highly organized." LeRoy directed five films in 1932 alone. The sound clarity is because of Vitaphone sound on disk technology.

== Reception ==
Although he called it "a sordid and melancholy study" that was "glum and gruesome" and "minus any comedy relief," New York Times critic Mordaunt Hall also found a lot to like in Two Seconds. "Edward G. Robinson contributes a remarkably forceful portrayal," he wrote, adding that the film was "adroitly done [and] compels attention." He called LeRoy's direction "imaginative and lifelike" and praised the supporting cast: "Preston Foster plays Bud Clark, a role he also interpreted on the stage. His acting is capital. Vivienne Osborne is very real as the conscienceless Shirley. J. Carroll Naish makes the most of the part of Tony." In summary, he writes: "In spite of its drab tale, it calls forth admiration, for it never falters."

Variety's 1932 review was less enamored: "General slowness and stodgy over-dramatics won't draw the flaps, nor will a tragic finale help." In later years, prolific critic Leslie Halliwell tersely called Two Seconds a "competent, pacy crime melodrama."

The film has been called an early (or first) example of film noir.

== Cultural references ==
When a girl says to Preston Foster "who's the smiling lieutenant over there," in reference to a sour-faced John Allen (Robinson), she's making a reference to the 1931 Ernst Lubitsch film The Smiling Lieutenant.

"She ain't no Peggy Joyce" Bud Clarke to John Allen (referring to a date he's setting John Allen with ('works in a laundrette')). Later: "There I was trying to get you Peggy Joyce and you go and get yourself hog tied to a dance hall dame" (Bud Clarke). Peggy Hopkins Joyce (May 26, 1893 – June 12, 1957) was an American actress, artist model and dancer. In addition to her performing career, Joyce was known for her numerous engagements, six marriages to wealthy men, subsequent divorces, scandalous affairs, her collection of diamonds and furs and her generally lavish lifestyle.

"Kewpie" doll. Early in the film John Allen is saying that he wants a girl with education. Bud: "You got me worried, next thing I know you'll be going sour on me n trippin' with one of them kewpies and a study book." Mass-produced "Kewpie" dolls, the representation of a comic strip character, were prolific in the US at the time. Bud is jokingly insinuating that John Allen will become childish: "I ain't bunking with no lily."

There's a reference to James Cagney (The Public Enemy, 1931) and grapefruit. Bud (Preston Foster) to girl in the street "why don't you let me sit across from ya, and squirt grapefruit juice in your eye, like they do in the movies." That refers to the notorious scene in The Public Enemy, in which Cagney viciously mashes a grapefruit into the face of Mae Clarke at breakfast.

"The old army game." Bud (Preston Foster), when Shirley Day brings John Allen back drunk, after having dragged him off to get married (she slipped the justice of the peace $10 because he was too drunk to stand). Bud Foster to Shirley Day: "I'm not going to let you pull the old army game on him" Shirley: "I'm not trying to pull the army game on him. He's married to me, right square and legal. (she shows Bud the ring) and there's nothing you, he or anyone can do about it!." The "army game" is the simplest con-trick, the "shell game," which, if you didn't know what it was, you would be easily taken in by. WC Fields refers to it when observing a shell (cup and ball) game proceeding in the 1926 Silent It's the Old Army Game. "That's the old army game" he says sagely, exposing the fraudster. The game would have been common in the army during the first world war.

When John Allen understands the true nature of Shirley Day, he says "I should throw you out." Shirley Day responds mockingly "Then the goose would stop laying the golden egg," as she was the only one bringing money into the house. That is a reference to one of Aesop's fables The goose that laid the golden eggs, an idiom used of an unprofitable action motivated by greed.

Latonia Race Track, Kentucky. When the bookmaker (Guy Kibbee) meets Bud and John outside Tonys dance hall, to pay out Tonys winnings of $38, bookie tries to get Tony to bet again: "How about something on the nose at Latonia tomorrow." Latonia, once regarded as among the United States' top sites for racing was closed in 1939, during the Great Depression.

Reference to Astor Hotel. Bud, in talking to the two girls, "Got anything special on tonight?" "Yeah, we were just about to get a bite to eat at the Astor." Bud: "Don't try to pull no Astor stunts on me. I don't come from the Bronx (poor area). Coupla drinks, the speak, a dance & maybe a movie." Bud is telling them he has money to spend. Hotel Astor was a prestigious hotel located in the Times Square area of Manhattan, in operation from 1904 through 1967. Featured a long list of elaborately themed ballrooms and exotic restaurants: the Old New York lobby, the American Indian Grill Room with artifacts collected with the help of the American Museum of Natural History, a Flemish smoking room, a Pompeian billiard room, the Hunt Room decorated in sixteenth-century German Renaissance style, and many other features.

"Owl dining car." Bud, when chatting up two girls in the street: "Got anything special on tonight?" Girl: "Yeah, we were just about to get a bite to eat at the Astor." Bud: "You got the Astor mixed up with the owl dining car aintcha?" Girl: "The owl ain't so bad at that." What were termed "owl wagons" from 1888, became furnished, fixed, "night owl" branded diners; converted streetcars, which proliferated in New York City when drinking alcohol was prohibited by the Volstead Act from 1920 to 1933. The "streetcar" styling of diners today echoes their first form.

When Shirley Day asks John Allen what he does for a living, John Allen replies, "Oh, I'm a riveter." "That's where you get those big muscles. How much do you earn?," she asks. "$62.54" (weekly), John responds. "You and Rockefeller!," Shirley enthuses. That is a reference to John D. Rockefeller (1839–1937), who was the richest man in America at the time.

== Home media ==
Two Seconds was released by Warner Bros. in 2010, on made-on-demand DVD as part of their Warner Archive series.
