= Man to Man (1930 film) =

1930 film by Allan Dwan

- Directed by: Allan Dwan
- Written by: Joseph Jackson
- Based on: "Barber John's Boy"; 1920 novel by Ben Ames Williams
- Starring: Phillips Holmes; Grant Mitchell; Lucille Powers; Otis Harlan; Dwight Frye
- Cinematography: Ira H. Morgan
- Edited by: George Marks
- Music by: Erno Rapee; Louis Silvers
- Distributed by: Warner Bros. Pictures
- Release date: December 6, 1930
- Running time: 68 minutes
- Country: United States
- Language: English

Man to Man is an all-talking American pre-Code drama film produced by Warner Bros. Pictures in 1930. The film was directed by Allan Dwan and stars Phillips Holmes. The film is based on the story "Barber John's Boy" by Ben Ames Williams.

== Plot ==
John Martin Bolton, a barber, is paroled after serving time for killing a man who murdered his brother. His son, Michael Bolton, ashamed of his father, works at a bank when the older Bolton is paroled. Michael wants nothing to do with John, despite John desiring to establish a relationship. Feeling that people are judging him because of his father, Michael decides to leave town with his girlfriend, Emily. However, Michael is financially unable to marry her. One of Michael's co-workers, Vint Glade, is also in love with Emily. Glade embezzles two thousand dollars from Michael's bank drawer hoping Mike will stand accused, thus ending any future with Emily. Michael assumes his father stole the money as he visited him at the bank earlier in the day. Michael falsely confesses to the embezzlement to prevent his father from returning to prison. At the same time, John confesses to stealing the money to prevent Michael from being charged. Emily suspects Glade stole the money and tricks him into confessing his crime. The Boltons, father and son, are happily reunited.

== Cast ==
- Phillips Holmes as Michael Bolton
- Grant Mitchell as Barber John Martin Bolton
- Lucille Powers as Emily
- Otis Harlan as Rip Henry
- Dwight Frye as Vint Glade
- Russell Simpson as Uncle Cal
- George F. Marion as Banker Jim McCord
- Robert Emmett O'Connor as the Sheriff

== Preservation ==
The film survives complete and has been released by Warner Archive on DVD. A print has also been preserved at the Library of Congress since the 1970s.
