= Week-End Marriage =

1932 film

- Directed by: Thornton Freeland
- Screenplay by: Sheridan Gibney
- Based on: Weekend Marriage; 1932 novel by Faith Baldwin
- Cinematography: Barney McGill
- Edited by: Herbert Levy
- Production company: First National Pictures
- Distributed by: Warner Bros. Pictures
- Release date: June 18, 1932
- Running time: 65 minutes
- Country: United States
- Language: English
- Budget: $149,000
- Box office: $267,000

Week-End Marriage is a 1932 American pre-Code comedy film directed by Thornton Freeland and starring Loretta Young. It was produced by First National Pictures and distributed by Warner Bros. Pictures. It is based on the 1932 novel, Week-End Marriage, by Faith Baldwin. The film is preserved at the Library of Congress.

== Plot ==
Lola Davis is enamored with her beau Ken Hayes, whose old fashioned morals dictate he earn enough to support a family before asking her to marry him. Despite Lola's protests, Ken takes an opportunity to travel to South America for an opportunity to get a pay raise, despite the fact that that will take him away from the country for two years. At her supremely modern sister-in-law Agnes' encouragement, Lola employs methods of passive aggressive manipulation in order to convince him to marry her immediately despite his plans. After a minor amount of resistance to Agnes' plans Lola caves and plays along just enough to encourage Ken to open the subject of whether or not she agrees with him that it's a good idea for him to take the role in Buenos Aires. When threatened with the prospect of Lola's marriage to another person Ken caves and says that if she can stand the thought of marriage, so can he. She insists that she will still work after their marriage, citing the fact that her brother Jim's relationship with Agnes is just fine despite Agnes working. The reality is that Jim deeply resents Agnes for not serving him in a more domestic manner, and constantly antagonizes her for having "tricked" him into marrying her.

At the wedding Ken expresses already having regrets through a solemn exchange with his new brother-in-law, Jim. Since they work in the same office they aren't allowed to share vacation time, and must stagger their time off. Their mutual loneliness during this period begins to wear on their relationship right away. A year into the marriage she's told by her employer, Mr. Jameson, that her work has been so impressive that he's decided to give her additional responsibilities and a raise which will bring her income to $40 per week—the same rate received by her husband. During this time Lola begins being friendly with another coworker, a man named Peter Acton who works at their company's St. Louis location. When Mr. Jameson says he'll likely be visiting St. Louis soon due to the fact that the office is struggling for unspecified reasons, Mr. Acton requests that if Mr. Jameson does visit he bring Lola with him. Jameson shames Acton, informing him that Miss. Davis is married. Acton laughs at this information and requests that Jameson bring her along all the same.

Lola comes home excited to tell Ken the news about her raise only to find the house untidy and Ken away. When he returns he informs her that he was fired from his position that day as the office is eliminating his department. He's been offered another job, but at a lower rate of $30 a week. Ken resents her raise, saying that she'll be wearing the pants from now on. Lola is bemused, asking him why that matters, but Ken merely shrugs and says anything goes these days.

Because of their varied schedules, Ken begins to take responsibility for cooking dinner. Unfortunately, one of Lola's friends (Connie) begs her to accompany her in order to convince her guardian (Joe) to let her keep working when they're married. When Lola calls Ken to let him know she'll be late because she has to have dinner somewhere else that night, Ken snaps that she can be as late as she'd like before storming out of the house still wearing an apron which leads to further humiliation when one of their neighbors laughs at him. As she leaves the office Peter Acton once again attempts to flirt with her, but she hurries out while dropping blatant signals that he should quit it, causing him and Mr. Jameson to share a laugh at his behavior.

At Connie's, Joe reacts violently to Lola's pleas that Connie be allowed to work instead of marrying the man Joe has set her up with. After knocking Connie to the ground he spouts a series of misogynistic beliefs common at the time, calling Connie lazy for not wanting to stay home and raise children and saying if he had his way he'd work all women until they begged for a house and children to care for. Connie's intended, Louis, arrives at the apartment and Connie is ordered to smile and like it. Joe tells Louis that Connie has agreed to marry him, and Louis is overjoyed to accept.

When Lola arrives home she sees the mess left behind by Ken's attempts at cooking dinner, and notes that he isn't home despite the fact that it's well after 11. She's woken in the morning by a call from the police station, who say that Ken has been arrested for drunk and disorderly conduct. She hurries to the police office to pay Ken's fine, and when she does realizes that a woman was brought in along with him. Lola pays the woman's fine as well, and the three exit. Ken asks Lola if she plans to ask him for details, and Lola says that she'd rather they just not speak on the matter anymore.

At the office the next day Mr. Jameson offers Lola a role as his personal assistant and a raise to $50 a week, stating that he's concerned that if he leaves she may end up losing her position there at the office due to his absence. She requests time to speak to her husband, and once she arrives home to do so she learns that Ken has been fired once again. She tells him he doesn't need to worry, that they can relocate to St. Louis for the job she's just been offered. This starts an argument where Ken insists that he will not go to St. Louis, complains that she has failed him as a wife and points out that he missed out on a similar opportunity in order to marry her. When she insists that now that he's been fired it's their only option, Ken tells her he's done and storms out.

Now in St. Louis is working with her own assistant and is settling in nicely with Peter's help. Ken has stopped writing to her, and she isn't too bothered about that. Peter lets her know that he's mad about her, but she gently informs him that she prefers her newfound independence. While at a surprise birthday party being held in her honor, Lola is given a telegram from her mother that arrived at the office shortly after she left. She learns that Ken has fallen gravely ill, and is urged to return home to New York. Peter aids in rushing her to the airfield in order to make a late night flight. Peter asks her to promise him something, but is cut off by the ignition of the engines and the plane pulls away before they can have an exchange.

Lola is turned away at Ken's door by the same woman she'd bailed out along with Ken. She learns from the doctor that Ken's condition is critical, and only the woman and he are permitted to see him. The doctor shames Lola for having abandoned him, saying that men require old fashioned women to feed and care for them since they are incapable of doing it themselves for unspecified reasons. Her now ex-sister-in-law Agnes tells Lola to sacrifice anything in order to keep her man, and that men are the only thing that matters (again for unspecified reasons). Lola is allowed to speak to Ken once his condition has stabilized, and lies to him saying that she's been fired from her job. She claims to feel helpless, deferring to Ken for help and begging him to let her stay. The unnamed woman voluntarily leaves after agonizing outside his door during this entire exchange, telling Ken to get well now that he's got his wife home. Ken asks Lola what she's gonna do, and she responds with the closing line, "Be a wife."

== Cast ==
- Loretta Young as Lola Davis Hayes
- Norman Foster as Ken Hayes
- Aline MacMahon as Agnes Davis
- George Brent as Peter Acton
- Grant Mitchell as Doctor
- Vivienne Osborne as Shirley
- Sheila Terry as Connie
- J. Farrell MacDonald as Mr. Davis
- Louise Carter as Mrs. Davis
- Roscoe Karns as Jim Davis

Uncredited:

- Luis Alberni as Louis The Bootlegger
- Irving Bacon as Grocery clerk
- Herman Bing as Mr. Mengel
- Bill Elliott as Birthday party guest

== Box office ==
According to Warner Bros the film earned $219,000 domestically and $48,000 foreign.
