= John Sheehan (actor) =

American actor (1909–1964)

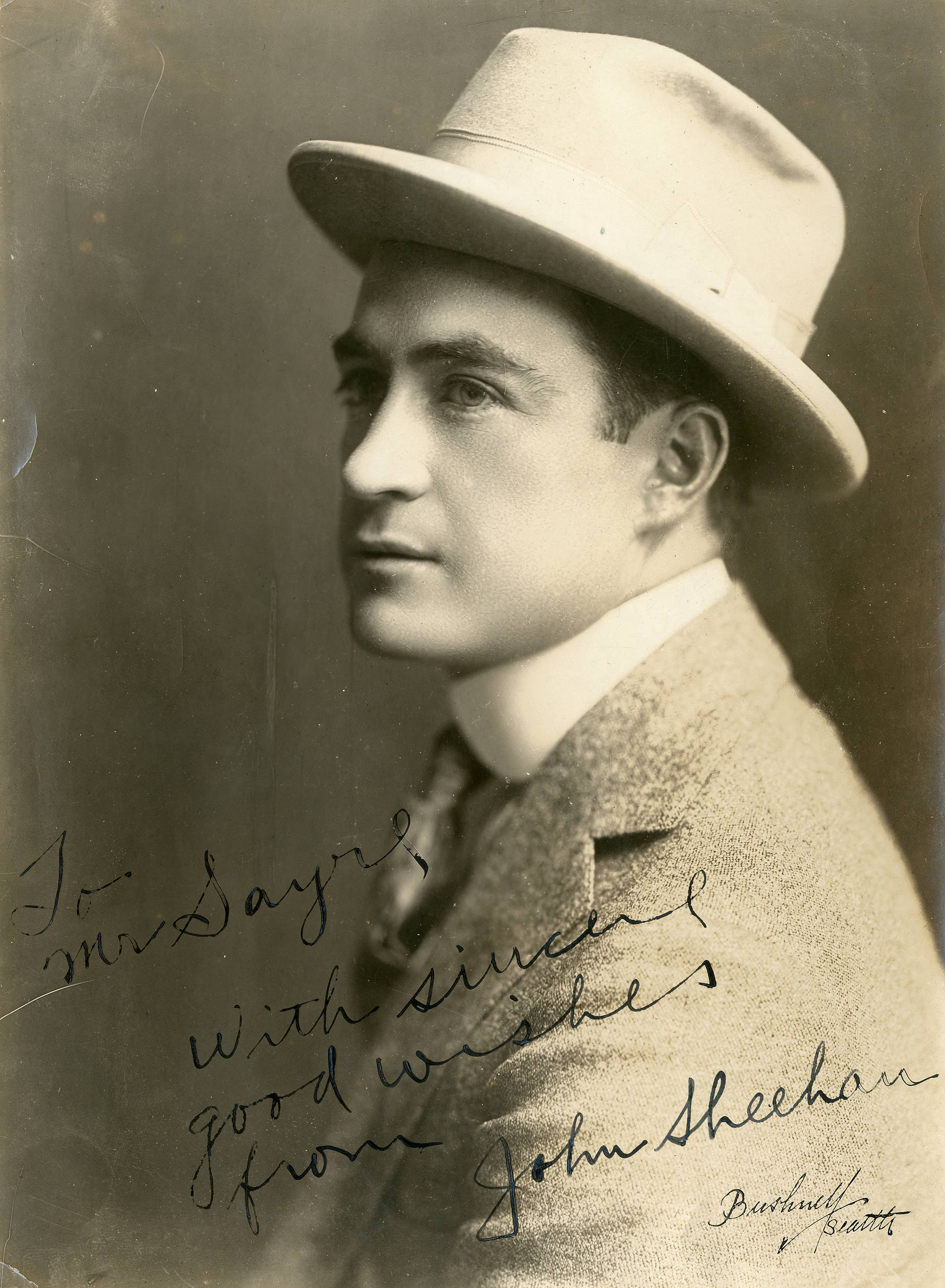
- Sheehan in 1917
- Born: October 22, 1885; Oakland, California, U.S.
- Died: February 14, 1952 (aged 66); Calabasas, California, U.S.
- Resting place: Holy Cross Cemetery, Culver City, California
- Occupation: Actor
- Years active: 1914–1952
- Spouse(s): Blanche Morris Roberts (m. 19??)
- Children: 2

John Sheehan (October 22, 1885 – February 14, 1952) was an American actor and vaudeville performer. After acting onstage and in vaudeville for several years, Sheehan began making films in 1914, starring in a number of short films. From 1914 to 1916, he appeared in over 60 films, the vast majority of them film shorts.

== Career ==
He returned exclusively to the stage in 1917, where he remained until the advent of sound films. He returned to the screen with a featured role in the 1930 melodrama, Swing High, starring Helen Twelvetrees.

His more notable performances and roles include: the first talking version of the film Kismet (1930), starring Otis Skinner and Loretta Young; a featured role in 1934's Little Miss Marker, starring Shirley Temple and Adolphe Menjou; Michael Curtiz's Kid Galahad (1937), starring Edward G. Robinson, Bette Davis, and Humphrey Bogart; the Spencer Tracy and Katharine Hepburn romantic comedy Woman of the Year (1942); the classic biopic The Pride of the Yankees (1943), starring Gary Cooper and Teresa Wright; another 1943 biographical film, Yankee Doodle Dandy, starring James Cagney; the Abbott and Costello comedy Buck Privates Come Home (1947); and the last film to be released in which he appeared was 1952's Somebody Loves Me, starring Betty Hutton and Ralph Meeker, which was released several months after Sheehan's death.

While Somebody Loves Me was his last film to be released, the last film which Sheehan worked on was the 1952 Tracy and Hepburn romantic comedy Pat and Mike. Production on Pat and Mike was in early 1952, and it was released in June of that year, four months after Sheehan died.

== Personal life and death ==
Sheehan was married to Blanche Morris Roberts, they had two children. He died on February 15, 1952, in Woodland Hills, California, and was buried in Holy Cross Cemetery, in Culver City.

== Filmography ==
(Per AFI database)

- The Key to Yesterday (1914)
- The Last Chapter (1915)
- Fighting Bob (1915)
- The High Hand (1915)
- Pretenses (1915)
- Swing High (1930)
- Kismet (1930)
- The Criminal Code (1931)
- Fair Warning (1931)
- Hold 'Em Jail (1932)
- As the Devil Commands (1932)
- Grand Slam (1933)
- Hard to Handle (1933)
- The Warrior's Husband (1933)
- King for a Night (1933)
- The Past of Mary Holmes (1933)
- Child of Manhattan (1933)
- Little Miss Marker (1934) as Jack Sheehan
- The House of Mystery (1934)
- Circus Clown (1934)
- The Personality Kid (1934)
- The Girl from Missouri (1934)
- The Human Side (1934)
- The Countess of Monte Cristo (1934)
- Such Women Are Dangerous (1934)
- Now I'll Tell (1934)
- That's Gratitude (1934) as Johnny Sheehan
- The Goose and the Gander (1935)
- Whipsaw (1935)
- Murder Man (1935)
- It Had to Happen (1936)
- Laughing Irish Eyes (1936)
- Ticket to Paradise (1936)
- The Ex-Mrs. Bradford (1936)
- Three Men on a Horse (1936)
- The Case of the Black Cat (1936)
- Here Comes Carter (1936)
- Rose Bowl (1936)
- Three Godfathers (1936)
- Marked Woman (1937) as Vincent
- All Over Town (1937)
- Dangerous Holiday (1937)
- On the Avenue (1937)
- Kid Galahad (1937) as Ringside Reporter (uncredited)
- The Great O'Malley (1937)
- Smart Blonde (1937)
- Night Club Scandal (1937)
- Join the Marines (1937)
- Midnight Court (1937)
- Love Takes Flight (1937)
- Wake Up and Live (1937)
- Island Captives (1937)
- Rascals (1938)
- Hollywood Hotel (1938)
- Dynamite Delaney (1938) (as Jack Sheehan)
- A Trip to Paris (1938)
- Mama Runs Wild (1938)
- Love on a Budget (1938)
- Down on the Farm (1938)
- Youth Takes a Fling (1938)
- Winner Take All (1939)
- Slightly Honorable (1939)
- Death of a Champion (1939)
- They Made Me a Criminal (1939)
- The Magnificent Fraud (1939)
- The Night of Nights (1939)
- Wolf Call (1939)
- Inside Story (1939)
- I'm from Missouri (1939)
- Torchy Blane... Playing with Dynamite (1939)
- Big Town Czar (1939)
- Quick Millions (1939)
- East of the River (1940)
- Mexican Spitfire Out West (1940)
- Men Against the Sky (1940)
- Hidden Enemy (1940)
- Seven Sinners (1940)
- Millionaires in Prison (1940)
- Flight Command (1940)
- Tin Pan Alley (1940)
- Gold Rush Maisie (1940)
- King of the Lumberjacks (1940)
- Hullabaloo (1940)
- Sandy Gets Her Man (1940)
- Margie (1940)
- Young As You Feel (1940)
- Bachelor Daddy (1941)
- Broadway Limited (1941)
- Honky Tonk (1941)
- Las Vegas Nights (1941)
- Melody Lane (1941)
- Mr. District Attorney in the Carter Case (1941)
- Mob Town (1941)
- Pacific Blackout (1941)
- The Strawberry Blonde (1941)
- Unfinished Business (1941)
- Kisses for Breakfast (1941)
- Mug Town (1942)
- Wake Island (1942)
- Broadway (1942)
- Jail House Blues (1942)
- Mrs. Wiggs of the Cabbage Patch (1942)
- Night in New Orleans (1942)
- Pittsburgh (1942)
- This Gun for Hire (1942)
- Woman of the Year (1942)
- Gangway for Tomorrow (1943)
- It Ain't Hay (1943)
- Johnny Come Lately (1943)
- Ladies' Day (1943)
- Never a Dull Moment (1943)
- The Payoff (1943)
- Silent Witness (1943)
- Bombardier (1943)
- Always a Bridesmaid (1943)
- The Pride of the Yankees (1943) as 1st Paper Hanger (uncredited)
- Yankee Doodle Dandy (1943) as Boarder (uncredited)
- The Heavenly Body (1944)
- Irish Eyes Are Smiling (1944)
- The Hitler Gang (1944)
- Casanova in Burlesque (1944)
- Man from Frisco (1944)
- The Man in Half Moon Street (1944)
- Marine Raiders (1944)
- Swingtime Johnny (1944)
- An American Romance (1944)
- Cinderella Jones (1946)
- I've Always Loved You (1946)
- The Killers (1946)
- Magnificent Doll (1946)
- Three Wise Fools (1946)
- California (1947)
- Blaze of Noon (1947)
- Buck Privates Come Home (1947)
- Easy Come, Easy Go (1947)
- Hit Parade of 1947 (1947)
- I Wonder Who's Kissing Her Now? (1947)
- The Shocking Miss Pilgrim (1947)
- Song of the Thin Man (1947)
- That's My Man (1947)
- Beyond Glory (1948)
- The Big Clock (1948)
- I Wouldn't Be in Your Shoes (1948)
- Night Has a Thousand Eyes (1948)
- Adventure in Baltimore (1949)
- Alias Nick Beal (1949)
- The Doolins of Oklahoma (1949)
- Red, Hot and Blue (1949)
- Top O' the Morning (1949)
- Copper Canyon (1950)
- Mr. Music (1950)
- Where Danger Lives (1950)
- The Big Gusher (1951)
- His Kind of Woman (1951)
- The Lady and the Bandit (1951)
- The People Against O'Hara (1951)
- Soldiers Three (1951)
- Two Tickets to Broadway (1951)
- Stage to Tucson (1951)
- Pat and Mike (1952)
- Somebody Loves Me (1952)
