= Wharf Angel =

1934 film by William Cameron Menzies

- Directed by: William Cameron Menzies; George Somnes
- Written by: Stephen Morehouse Avery; Frederick Schlick; Samuel Hoffenstein; Frank Partos
- Produced by: Emanuel Cohen; Albert Lewis
- Starring: Victor McLaglen; Dorothy Dell; David Landau; Preston Foster
- Cinematography: Victor Milner
- Production company: Paramount Pictures
- Distributed by: Paramount Pictures
- Release date: March 16, 1934
- Running time: 65 minutes
- Country: United States
- Language: English

Wharf Angel is a 1934 American drama film directed by William Cameron Menzies and George Somnes and starring Victor McLaglen, Dorothy Dell, David Landau, and Preston Foster. Wharf Angel was the first screenplay of Stephen Morehouse Avery.

== Plot ==
Two stokers who work on the same ship become rivals for the love of a woman who works in a saloon in the tough Barbary Coast area of San Francisco.

== Cast ==
- Victor McLaglen as Turk
- Dorothy Dell as Toy
- Preston Foster as Como Murphy
- Alison Skipworth as Mother Bright
- David Landau as Moore
- John Rogers as Goliath
- Mischa Auer as Sadik
- Alfred Delcambre as Steve
- James Burke as Brooklyn Jack
- Frank Sheridan as The Skipper
- Donald E. Wilson as Slim
- John Northpole as Vasil
- Alice Lake as Saloon Girl
- Grace Bradley as Saloon Girl
- Jill Dennett as Saloon Girl
- Jack Cheatham as Sailor
