= The Great Magoo =

1932 play by Ben Hecht and Gene Fowler

The Great Magoo was an unsuccessful 1932 Broadway play written by Ben Hecht and Gene Fowler.

The play follows Nicky, a songwriter, and Julie, a dancer, in a tumultuous relationship.

The Coney Island dancehall girl becomes, briefly, a celebrity as a singer on the radio with her boyfriend's song, "It's Only a Paper Moon". The song is frequently reprised by the voice of the leading lady. The song's music is by Harold Arlen and lyrics by Yip Harburg and Billy Rose.

The play debuted at the Selwyn Theatre on Broadway on December 2, 1932, produced by Billy Rose and directed by George Abbott, starring Claire Carleton and Paul Kelly but was not well received by critics and closed after 11 performances. Brooks Atkinson of The New York Times praised the director and the performers but called it "rather stale and malodorous."

The play was filmed as Shoot the Works in 1934, directed by Wesley Ruggles and starring Jack Oakie, Ben Bernie and Dorothy Dell.
