= Love on Toast =

1937 film by Ewald André Dupont

- Film poster
- Directed by: Ewald André Dupont
- Screenplay by: Richard Connell; Doris Malloy; Jane Storm
- Produced by: Emanuel Cohen
- Starring: Stella Adler; John Payne; Grant Richards; Kathryn Kane
- Cinematography: Charles Edgar Schoenbaum
- Edited by: Ray Curtiss
- Music by: Score: George Stoll; Songs: Sam Coslow; Burton Lane
- Production company: Emanuel Cohen Productions
- Distributed by: Paramount Pictures
- Release date: December 3, 1937
- Running time: 65 minutes
- Country: United States
- Language: English

Love on Toast is a 1937 American comedy film directed by Ewald André Dupont. It was John Payne's fourth film and acting teacher Stella Adler’s first of only three.

== Plot ==
Linda Craven (Stella Adler), the press agent for a soup company, is tasked with hiring a "Mr. Manhattan" and "Miss Brooklyn" for an ad campaign. A singing soda jerk named Bill Adams (John Payne) is selected as Mr. Manhattan, after which he helps to select Polly Marr (Kathryn "Sugar" Kane) as Miss Brooklyn. Marr proves to be brash and troublesome, but along the way Adams falls in love with Craven.

== Cast ==
- Stella Adler (credited as Stella Ardler) as Linda Craven
- John Payne as Bill Adams
- Grant Richards as Clark Sanford
- Kathryn Kane as Polly Marr
- Benny Baker as Egbert
- Isabell Jewell as Belle Huntley
- Luis Alberni as Joe Piso

== Critical reception ==
A contemporary review in Variety described the film as a "slapsticky comedy" that "might have been far more impressive if farcical scenes had been built up instead of falling for the temptation to toss pastry and inject roughhouse methods," and noted that Adler "looks well despite faulty makeup but fits into the cinema acting scene whenever given opportunity [and who] shines despite the grotesque hokum," and "lavish sets and costly costuming is background for [this] mawkish fable [...] direction of E.A. Dupont is neither even nor effective."
