= Arletta Duncan =

American actress

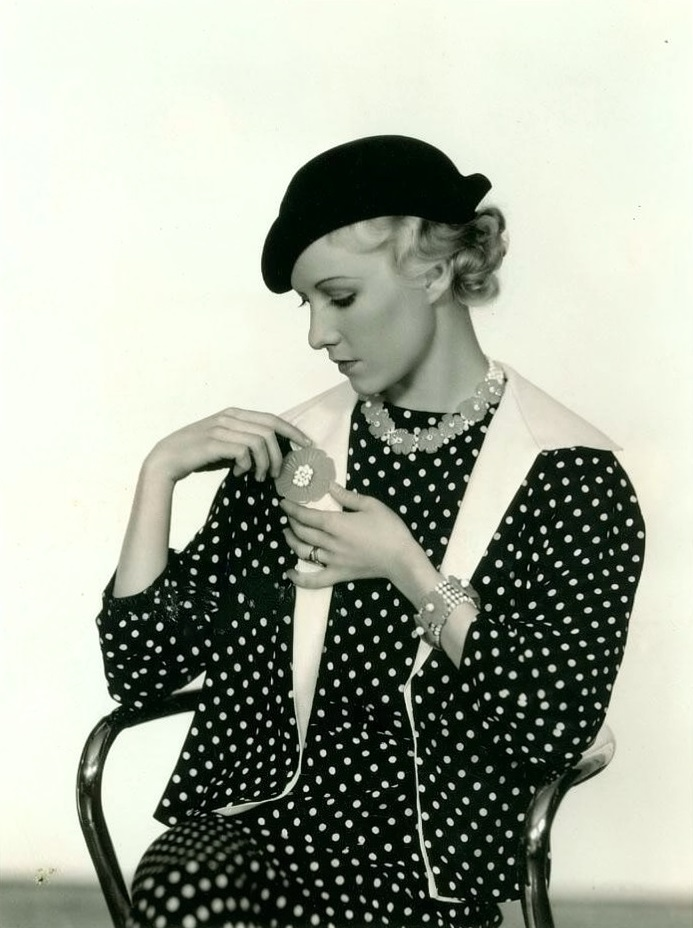
- Born: December 13, 1914; New Orleans, Louisiana
- Died: October 28, 1985 (aged 70)
- Occupation: film actress
- Years active: 1931–1937

Arletta Duncan (31 December 1914 – 28 October 1985), was an American actress. After being selected from a photo contest, she attended Universal Pictures' "little red school house," a film school for aspiring actors and actresses. She was described as having blue eyes, brown hair and a sweet singing voice, and was rumored to be dating Tom Brown. She appeared in 11 films between 1931 and 1937.

Arletta died in Santa Ana, California.

== Selected filmography ==
- Night World (1932)
- Back Street (1932)
- Fast Companions (1932)
- The Fighting Champ (1932)
- The Gallant Fool (1933)
- Unknown Blonde (1934)
- Menace (1934)
- Teacher's Beau (short) (1935)
- Mile-a-Minute-Love (1937)
- Damaged Goods (1937)
