= Shoot the Works (film) =

1934 film by Wesley Ruggles

- Theatrical release poster
- Directed by: Wesley Ruggles
- Screenplay by: Claude Binyon; Gene Fowler; Howard J. Green; Ben Hecht
- Produced by: Albert Lewis; Adolph Zukor
- Starring: Jack Oakie; Ben Bernie; Dorothy Dell; Alison Skipworth; Roscoe Karns; Arline Judge; William Frawley
- Cinematography: Leo Tover
- Production company: Paramount Pictures
- Distributed by: Paramount Pictures
- Release date: June 29, 1934
- Running time: 80 minutes
- Country: United States
- Language: English

Shoot the Works is a 1934 American pre-Code comedy film directed by Wesley Ruggles and written by Claude Binyon, Gene Fowler, Howard J. Green and Ben Hecht. It is based on the Gene Fowler and Harold Hecht 1932 play The Great Magoo (and not, despite the title, the 1931 musical revue Shoot the Works). The film stars Jack Oakie, Ben Bernie, Dorothy Dell, Alison Skipworth, Roscoe Karns, Arline Judge and William Frawley. It was released on June 29, 1934, by Paramount Pictures, just before rigorous enforcement of the Hollywood Production Code that began on July 1, 1934.

The final film for Dorothy Dell and Lew Cody, both of whom were deceased by the time of the film's release.

== Cast ==
- Jack Oakie as Nicky Nelson
- Ben Bernie as Joe Davis
- Dorothy Dell as Lily Raquel
- Alison Skipworth as The Countess
- Roscoe Karns as Sailor Burke
- Arline Judge as Jackie Donovan
- William Frawley as Larry Hale
- Lew Cody as Axel Hanratty
- Paul Cavanagh as Alvin Ritchie
- Monte Vandergrift as Man from Board of Health
- Jill Dennett as Wanda
- Lee Kohlmar as Professor Jonas
- Tony Merlo as Headwaiter
- Ben Taggart as Detective
- Charles McAvoy as Cop
- Fred Lawrence as Crooner

== Reception ==
In a contemporary review for The New York Times, critic Andre Sennwald called Shoot the Works "a remarkably dull show" and wrote a scathing review:

"The Great Magoo" has now been scrubbed, rinsed and dried in the California sunshine with such heartiness that not only its stench but also its humor has been washed out. Flaying the production for its attention to dramatic hygiene is obviously not the most effective method of prodding the producers into the pastures now being staked out for them by the current film crusade. Their error resided, not in their well-intentioned efforts to perform a major operation upon a bawdy play, but their attempt to transfer the guttersnipe population of "The Great Magoo" to the screen in the first place. Lacking anything in its structure that might be mistaken for a thesis, the story depends for its lure upon a cynical contemplation of a gaudy and fly-blown crew of small-time show people. Staking its claims to recognition upon its success in escaping the usual beery sentimentalisms with which the drama regards her children, the work, in its film version, turns a back somersault into the emotional commonplaces which it originally sought to avoid.
