= Sing Sinner Sing =

1933 film by Howard Christie

- DVD cover for film
- Directed by: Howard Christie
- Written by: Wilson Collison (play Clip Joint); Edward T. Lowe Jr. (adaptation and screenplay)
- Produced by: Larry Darmour (executive producer); Phil Goldstone (producer)
- Starring: See below
- Cinematography: Ira H. Morgan
- Edited by: Otis Garrett
- Distributed by: Majestic Pictures
- Release date: 1933
- Running time: 74 minutes 66 minutes (American DVD)
- Country: United States

Sing Sinner Sing is a 1933 American pre-Code romantic drama film directed by Howard Christie.

== Plot ==
Leila Hyams plays a singer who is accused of her husband's murder.

== Cast ==
- Paul Lukas as Phil Carida
- Leila Hyams as Lela Larson
- Don Dillaway as Ted Rendon
- Ruth Donnelly as Maggie Flannigan
- George E. Stone as Spats
- Joyce Compton as Gwen
- Jill Dennett as Sadie
- Arthur Hoyt as Uncle Homer
- Walter McGrail as Louis
- Gladys Blake as Cecily Gordon
- Arthur Housman as Jerry
- Edgar Norton as Roberts the Butler
- John St. Polis as James Parks
- Stella Adams as Aunt Emily van Puyten
- Pat O'Malley as Henchman Conley
- Walter Brennan as Henchman Riordan

Various artists, such as Lionel Hampton and Marshal Royal, can be seen playing in bands in the film.

== Production notes ==
At the time the movie was released, it was recognized as being loosely based on the 1932 Libby Holman-Zachary Smith Reynolds case.

According to Jeanne Scheper, other films inspired by "this episode of Holman's life include [...] Reckless (dir. Victor Fleming, 1935), with Jean Harlow; and Written on the Wind (dir. Douglas Sirk, 1956), with Lauren Bacall and Rock Hudson."
