= Sandy Is a Lady =

- Theatrical release poster
- Directed by: Charles Lamont
- Screenplay by: Charles Grayson
- Produced by: Burt Kelly
- Starring: Baby Sandy; Billy Lenhart; Kenneth Brown; Eugene Pallette; Nan Grey; Tom Brown; Mischa Auer; Billy Gilbert; Edgar Kennedy
- Cinematography: Milton Krasner
- Edited by: Philip Cahn
- Production company: Universal Pictures
- Distributed by: Universal Pictures
- Release date: May 21, 1940
- Running time: 62 minutes
- Country: United States
- Language: English

Sandy Is a Lady is a 1940 American comedy film directed by Charles Lamont and written by Charles Grayson. The film stars Baby Sandy, Billy Lenhart, Kenneth Brown, Eugene Pallette, Nan Grey, Tom Brown, Mischa Auer, Billy Gilbert and Edgar Kennedy. The film was released on May 21, 1940, by Universal Pictures.

== Cast ==
- Baby Sandy as Baby Sandy
- Billy Lenhart as Pat
- Kenneth Brown as Mike
- Eugene Pallette as P.J. Barnett
- Nan Grey as Mary Phillips
- Tom Brown as Joe Phillips
- Mischa Auer as Felix Lobo Smith
- Billy Gilbert as Billy Pepino
- Edgar Kennedy as Officer Rafferty
- Fritz Feld as Mario
- Anne Gwynne as Millie
- Richard Lane as Philip Jarvis
- Charles C. Wilson as Sergeant
- Joe Downing as Nick Case
- John Kelly as Murphy
- William Haade as Truck Driver
- George Meeker as Mr. Porter
- Kay Linaker as Mrs. Porter
