= Otis Garrett =

American film director

- Born: Otis Edgar Garrett; March 29, 1905; Washington, United States
- Died: May 24, 1941 (aged 36); Glendale, California, United States
- Resting place: Forest Lawn Memorial Park
- Occupations: Director, Writer, Editor
- Years active: 1931–1941 (film)
- Spouses: Elizabeth K. Mertes (m. 1924; div. 1931); Earlene Marie Heath (m. 1935; div. 1939)
- Relatives: Doris May

Otis Edgar Garrett (March 29, 1905 – May 24, 1941) was an American film editor, screenwriter and film director, perhaps best remembered for being the most frequently employed of Universal's Crime Club directors. He was the brother of silent film actress Doris May (Note: aka Doris Lee, born Helen Gregory Garrett.) and the brother-in-law of actor/producer Wallace MacDonald.

== Early life and career ==
Born in Tacoma, Washington on March 29, 1905, Garrett was the son of Helen Gregory Ellen (née Otis) (Note: The 1900 newspaper marriage license listing has her as "Miss Gregory E. Otis", as opposed to her 1910 US Census form entry, which is simply Helen Garrett. Otto Garrett, in his 1940 WW II Draft Registration card, lists her as Mrs. H. Ellen O. Garrett.) and George Edgar Garrett. Raised in Tacoma, San Diego, and Los Angeles, he attended the San Diego School of Expression, where his occasional cast-mates included both his sister Helen—aka Doris May—and future fellow Universal helmer Arthur Lubin.

== Personal life and death ==
Garrett was married twice, both marriages ending in divorce. In the spring of 1924, he married Elizabeth Kathryn Mertes, with whom, in 1927, he had a daughter, Patricia. By 1930, the relationship had deteriorated to such an extent that a judge was compelled to order both parties to stop "stealing" their then 3-year-old child from each other. By the spring of 1931, both parties had filed for divorce, each on grounds of mental cruelty. Garrett's sister, by then Mrs. Wallace MacDonald, testified on her brother's behalf, stating that, were he to be awarded custody, she would personally care for the child. By May 31, the judge, having long been urging both sides to reconcile for the sake of the child, finally acknowledged the futility of such hopes and granted the divorce to Mrs. Garrett, but with the stipulation that custody of their child be shared.

On December 20, 1935, Garrett married actress Earlene Marie Heath. Aside from their divorce, reconciliation, second divorce, and some much-publicized alimony litigation, this marriage produced two additional children, a son, Anthony Otis, and a daughter, Judith Lynn.

On May 24, 1941, Garrett died, aged 36, at Doctors and Students Hospital in Glendale, California, survived by his mother, his three children, and his sister. An autopsy revealed his cause of death to be "accidental bromide poisoning that followed a dental operation".

The Associated Press, in its brief but widely disseminated obituary, reported that, at the times of his death, Garrett was "to have been married next August to Miss Susan Cleary of North Hollywood".

Garrett's remains are interred at Forest Lawn Memorial Park in Glendale, California.

== Filmography ==
=== Director ===
- The Last Express (1938)
- Danger on the Air (1938)
- The Black Doll (1938)
- Personal Secretary (1938)
- The Lady in the Morgue (1938)
- Exile Express (1939)
- Mystery of the White Room (1939)
- The Witness Vanishes (1939)
- Sandy Gets Her Man (1940)
- Margie (1940)
- World Premiere (1941)

=== Editor ===
- The Guilty Generation (1931)
- Behind the Mask (1932)
- The Crusader (1932)
- The Unwritten Law (1932)
- The Mystic Hour (1933)
- The Vampire Bat (1933)
- Gigolettes of Paris (1933)
- The World Gone Mad (1933)
- Curtain at Eight (1933)
- The Sin of Nora Moran (1933)
- What Price Decency (1933)
- Sing Sinner Sing (1933)
- Unknown Blonde (1934)
- Breezing Home (1937)
- Night Key (1937)
- The Westland Case (1937)

=== Screenwriter ===
- Age of Indiscretion (1935)
- O'Shaughnessy's Boy (1935)
- Woman Wanted (1935)
- Meet the Chump (1941)

== Bibliography ==
- Shelley, Peter. Frances Farmer: The Life and Films of a Troubled Star. McFarland, 2014.
