= Baby Sandy =

American child actress (1938–2024)

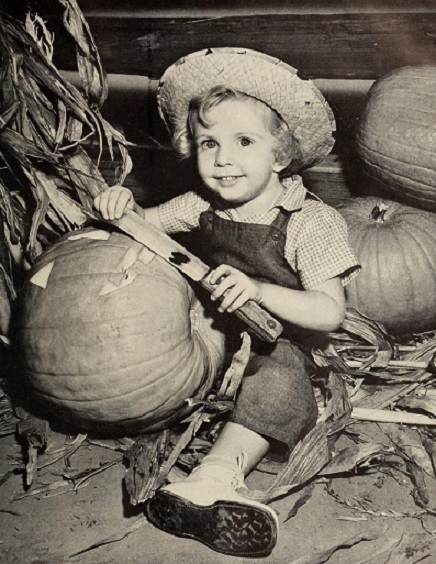
Baby Sandy Cine M411

Alexandra Lea Magee (née Henville, January 14, 1938 – January 16, 2024), known better as Baby Sandy, was an American child film actress.

== Life and career ==
Henville was born, prematurely, in hospital in Los Angeles, California, on January 14, 1938. She performed in her first film at the age of 15 months. She was considered "Universal Pictures' wonder baby" and their answer to Shirley Temple. Her last film was before her fifth birthday, made for a second rank studio, Republic Pictures. She grew up and worked in the legal department of a local government. She married and divorced twice, and had three sons. Magee died in East Flat Rock, North Carolina, on January 16, 2024, aged 86.

For Sandy Gets Her Man Eilene Janssen was her stunt double.

Her film Bachelor Daddy is based on a similar concept to the much later Three Men and a Baby.

She was awarded "Baby of the Year" by Parents Magazine in 1940.

As an adult she became a legal secretary.

== Filmography ==
- East Side of Heaven (1939) Sandy, the Barrett Baby
- Unexpected Father (1939) Sandy (as Sandy Lee)
- Little Accident (1939) Sandy
- Sandy Is a Lady (1940) Baby Sandy
- Sandy Gets Her Man (1940) Sandy
- Bachelor Daddy (1941) Sandy (as Sandra Lee Henville)
- Melody Lane (1941) Sandy (as Sandy)
- Johnny Doughboy (1942) Baby Sandy
- Life Alert television commercial (2005)

== Bibliography ==
- Best, Marc. Those Endearing Young Charms: Child Performers of the Screen (South Brunswick and New York: Barnes & Co., 1971), pp. 225–229.
