= Unexpected Father =

1939 film by Charles Lamont

- Directed by: Charles Lamont
- Written by: Charles Grayson; Leonard Spigelgass
- Produced by: Ken Goldsmith
- Starring: Baby Sandy; Shirley Ross; Dennis O'Keefe
- Cinematography: George Robinson
- Edited by: Ted J. Kent
- Music by: Frank Skinner
- Production company: Universal Pictures
- Distributed by: Universal Pictures
- Release date: June 14, 1939
- Running time: 78 minutes
- Country: United States
- Language: English

Unexpected Father is a 1939 American comedy drama film directed by Charles Lamont and starring Baby Sandy, Shirley Ross and Dennis O'Keefe.

== Plot ==
When a former dancing partner is killed, an entertainer looks after his baby son with the help of his girlfriend and roommate.

== Cast ==
- Baby Sandy as Sandy
- Shirley Ross as Dianna Donovan
- Dennis O'Keefe as Jimmy Hanley
- Mischa Auer as Boris Bebenko
- Joy Hodges as Peg
- Dorothy Arnold as Sally
- Anne Gwynne as Kitty
- Anne Nagel as Beulah
- Donald Briggs as Allen Rand, theatre manager
- Richard Lane as Leo Murphy, Booking Agent
- Paul Guilfoyle as Ed Stone, Sandy's Uncle
- Mayo Methot as Ethel Stone
- Jane Darwell as Mrs. Callahan
- Spencer Charters as Magistrate
- Mary Field as Nurse

== Bibliography ==
- Rowan, Terry. World War II Goes to the Movies & Television Guide.
