= Jane Storm =

American screenwriter

- Born: Genevieve C. Grogan; November 4, 1894; Cyget, Ohio, USA
- Died: May 15, 1982 (aged 87); Woodland Hills, Los Angeles, California, USA
- Spouses: Floyd Storm (divorced): Homer Berry

Jane Storm (born Genevieve Grogan; November 4, 1894 – May 15, 1982) was an American screenwriter active in the 1930s and 1940s.

== Biography ==
Genevieve Grogan was born in Cyget, Ohio, in 1894 to Michael Grogan and Mary King. She was raised in Ohio as part of a big family, and they were all living in Los Angeles by 1920.

In 1926, she married her first husband, commercial artist Floyd Storm. The marriage did not last long; by 1931, she had sought (and won) a divorce on the grounds that Floyd was drinking heavily.

She got her start in the film industry working as a stenographer and then in the scenario department at Paramount. In 1933, she was promoted to full-fledged writer; her first writing assignment was working on Green Loaning with Phil Strong. Over the next decade or so, she'd write or contribute to more than a dozen scripts.

She was married to Homer Berry—a pioneering aviator—in 1942; the pair had no children.

== Selected filmography ==
- Mrs. Wiggs of the Cabbage Patch (1942)
- Sandy Gets Her Man (1940)
- Love on Toast (1947)
- Millions in the Air (1935)
- Two for Tonight (1935)
- Mrs. Wiggs of the Cabbage Patch (1934)
- Such Women Are Dangerous (1934)
- My Lips Betray (1933)
- Adorable (1933)
