= Two for Tonight =

1935 film by Frank Tuttle

- Theatrical release poster
- Directed by: Frank Tuttle
- Written by: George Marion Jr.; Jane Storm; Harry Ruskin
- Based on: Two for Tonight by J. O. Lief and Max Lief
- Produced by: Douglas MacLean
- Starring: Bing Crosby; Joan Bennett; Mary Boland
- Cinematography: Karl Struss
- Music by: Mack Gordon; Harry Revel
- Production company: Paramount Pictures
- Distributed by: Paramount Pictures
- Release date: September 12, 1935 (US)
- Running time: 61 minutes
- Country: United States
- Language: English

Two for Tonight is a 1935 American musical comedy film directed by Frank Tuttle and starring Bing Crosby, Joan Bennett, and Mary Boland. Based on the play Two for Tonight by J. O. Lief and Max Lief, the film is about a songwriter who composes a full-length theatrical piece within a few days.

== Plot ==
Crosby is cast as Gilbert, one of three half-brothers, Gilbert, Buster and Pooch, sons of the much-married. debt-ridden, widow Mrs. Smythe. While the broker's men are removing the furniture he sings a song he has composed 'Takes Two to Make a Bargain' (including parody lines, 'Did you ever see a piano walking' and 'Pianni doesn't live here anymore').

In an endeavor to sell the song to Alexander Myers, a song publisher, Gilbert hides in a tree beneath which Myers is resting. Gilbert is unaware that the publisher is completely deaf and, to add to his troubles, when he starts singing a plane circles above and then crashes into the tree. He is injured but after a few days, whilst pushing him in an invalid chair, his mother tells him that she has sued the pilot who is to pay 50,000 dollars compensation for preventing Gilbert from completing his musical play. He protests that he never had any play and they then encounter the pilot, Bobbie, who says she will pay the money at 15 dollars per week from her salary as secretary to Harry Kling the theatrical producer.

Bobbie arranges an appointment for Gilbert to see Kling who, when they arrive, is having trouble finding a suitable play for his actress girlfriend Lilly. Gilbert tries to explain to him the details of the accident but Kling thinks he is outlining a play and tells him to have it finished by the time Kling returns from Paris in seven days. With a group of actors Gilbert takes over Kling's Long Island estate to write a musical play called 'Two for Tonight'. He sings 'From the Top of Your Head' to Bobbie but running out of ideas for the play is advised by Homps, the butler, to 'go out and meet life' to get material for the second act. Homps is an ex-theatrical producer from Budapest who is waiting for money that will come to him on the death of his Uncle Ludwig.

To follow Homps' suggestion, Bobbie tries to persuade Gilbert to take her to dinner but Lilly intervenes and after he sings 'Without a Word of Warning' to Bobbie, Lilly takes him to the Purple Cafe. He becomes impatient with waiting for something to happen which can be introduced into his play and, after tripping up a waiter, rings the police and tells them to come to the Purple Cafe. They mistake him for a crazy fellow, Benny the Goof, who Gilbert meets at the cafe and together they start a battle with soda-water syphons which eventually involves everyone, including the police, in a riot. Gilbert lands in jail where Bobbie visits him and is serenaded with 'I Wish I Were Aladdin' by Gilbert and a chorus of prisoners.

Released from his cell, Gilbert resumes rehearsal and a love scene with Lilly is misinterpreted by Bobbie and Kling arriving from Europe. Bobbie walks out and Kling says that the play is off. Homps, however, now reveals that his uncle has died, he has inherited the money and that he will finance and produce the play. Gilbert pursues Bobbie, declares his devotion and, after he reprises 'Without a Word of Warning' she returns for a happy ending. Homps and Mrs. Smythe are arm-in-arm and she seems destined for yet another marriage.

== Cast ==
- Bing Crosby as Gilbert Gordon
- Joan Bennett as Bobbie Lockwood
- Mary Boland as Mrs. Smythe
- Lynne Overman as Harry Kling
- Thelma Todd as Lilly Bianco
- James Blakeley as Buster Da Costa
- Douglas Fowley as Pooch Donahue
- Maurice Cass as Alexander Myers
- Ernest Cossart as Homps
- Eddie Kane as Charlie
- Charles Lane as Writer
- Lionel Pape as Lord Ralston
- Doris Lloyd as Lady Ralston
- Charles Arnt as Benny the Goof
- Jack Mulhall as Doctor
- John Gough as Prisoner
- A. S. 'Pop' Byron as Jailer
- John Gough as Prisoner
- Jerry Mandy as Waiter

== Critical response ==
The New York Times was not impressed. "If Two for Tonight the new Bing Crosby film at the Paramount, had a second act as richly comic as its first, there is little doubt but that it would be hailed this morning as one of the merriest comedies of the season. Unfortunately for us all, the battery of writers neglected to bring up their reserves and permitted their lunatic script to walk, rather than run, to the nearest exit."

Variety was disappointed too. "Despite its relatively short footage — clocked at 60 minutes at the Broadway Paramount screening — Two for Tonight is still a rather loose affair. Not up to Bing Crosby’s best and will have to be carried solely by the crooner, Joan Bennett and the rest of the marquee names...

The reaction from Los Angeles was negative as well. "If you are one of those who like Bing Crosby’s crooning, you will like Two for Tonight, for Crosby has abundant opportunity to croon in the picture. . . . If you are looking for anything more, I am afraid you are going to be disappointed, because Two for Tonight considered as a screen play, is not among today’s better pictures."

In their December, 1935 edition, Modern Screen gave the film a one-star review and wrote "Even the best of studios make mistakes … Built around an impossible story, with situations always bordering on slapstick and lines that are supposed to be funny falling with a thud that can almost be heard on the sound track, this is one long headache for a number of people, including Bing Crosby and the audience."

Not all reviewers were dissatisfied, however. Writing for The Spectator in 1935, Graham Greene described the film as "very amusing and well-written entertainment", and characterized it as a theatrically-inclined work demanding criticism in terms of its actors and its authors rather than its direction and camerawork. From this perspective, Greene noted that the film "would have been even more amusing behind footlights".

== Soundtrack ==
"Two for Tonight"
"I Wish I Were Aladdin"
"From the Top of Your Head"
"Takes Two to Make a Bargain"
"Without a Word of Warning"
All written by Mack Gordon and Harry Revel. All sung by Bing Crosby, who also recorded them for Decca Records. "I Wish I Were Aladdin", "From the Top of Your Head" and "Without a Word of Warning" enjoyed top 10 chart success. His songs were included on the Bing's Hollywood series.
