= Karl Kiffe =

American drummer

- Birth name: Karl Herman Kiffe
- Born: July 6, 1927; Los Angeles, California, U.S.
- Died: May 10, 2004 (aged 76); Las Vegas, Nevada, U.S.
- Genres: Jazz
- Occupation: Musician
- Instrument: Drums
- Years active: 1942–1994

Karl Kiffe (July 6, 1925 – May 10, 2004) was an American jazz drummer featured in specialty numbers in a number of Hollywood feature films during World War II and later as a featured member of Jimmy Dorsey's orchestra.

== Career ==
Born in Los Angeles, Kiffe first attracted attention as winner of the annual Gene Krupa Contest in 1943. Succeeding Chuck Falkner as leader of the Hollywood Canteen Kids, Kiffe was featured in novelty numbers in several feature films before working as a single in Ken Murray's Blackouts. In July 1945 he was hired by Jimmy Dorsey, with whom he worked for about a year, and then again from July 1950 through February '53. Over the next decade, Kiffe worked with, among others, Stan Getz, Zoot Sims, Charlie Shavers, Red Norvo and Woody Herman, as well as singers Andy Williams, June Christy, and Ella Fitzgerald.

Speaking in 1946, when asked which drummer he most admired, Kiffe cited the solos of Buddy Rich, while praising the big band work of Don Lamond and Jo Jones.

== Personal life ==
In 1958, Kiffe married Carol Jean Beall in Las Vegas. They had two children. He was also a great friends of the musician and saxophonist Warne Marsh.

Autobiography: https://docs.google.com/document/d/1Cx1QjSAnwCIm3G4eWqoOzI_LQmDoFeXivfXkORfsBaY/edit?usp=sharing

== Filmography ==
=== Film ===
- Johnny Doughboy (1942)
- Song of the Open Road (1944)
- Youth Aflame (1944)
- Jimmy Dorsey's Varieties (1952)

=== Television ===
- Stars of Jazz (With Red Norvo, April 21, 1958)
- The Ed Sullivan Show (with Benny Goodman, November 6, 1960)

== Discography ==
=== As sideman ===
With Jimmy Dorsey

- At the 400 Restaurant 1946 (HEP, 1994; rec. 1946)
- Casino Gardens Ballroom 1946 (HEP, 1999; rec. 1946)
- More (Jazz Crusade, 1950)
- One Night Stand with Jimmy Dorsey at the Statler (Joyce, 198_; rec. November 1951)
- The Swingin' Dorseys (Decca, 195_)

With others

- Georgie Auld, That's Auld (Discovery, 1950)
- Don Stratton, Modern Jazz With Dixieland Roots (ABC-Paramount, 1956)
- Red Norvo, Windjammer City Style (Dot, 1958)
- Pee Wee Russell, Portrait of Pee Wee (Counterpoint, 1958)
- Tommy Vig, The Tommy Vig Orchestra (Take V, 1965)
- Helen Humes Midsummer Night's Songs (RCA, 1974)
