= The Fighting Champ =

1932 film

- Theatrical release poster
- Directed by: John P. McCarthy
- Screenplay by: Wellyn Totman
- Produced by: Trem Carr
- Starring: Bob Steele; Arletta Duncan; Kit Guard; George Chesebro; George "Gabby" Hayes; Charles King
- Cinematography: Archie Stout
- Edited by: Carl Pierson
- Production company: Monogram Pictures
- Distributed by: Monogram Pictures
- Release date: December 15, 1932
- Running time: 57 minutes
- Country: United States
- Language: English

The Fighting Champ is a 1932 American Western film directed by John P. McCarthy and written by Wellyn Totman. The film stars Bob Steele, Arletta Duncan, Kit Guard, George Chesebro, George "Gabby" Hayes and Charles King. The film was released on December 15, 1932, by Monogram Pictures.

== Plot ==
After cowboy Loring ventures into boxing, crooked fight promoter Harmon tries to bribe him to throw a bout. Loring pretends to be interested, but Mullins accuses him of cheating. Mullins' daughter believes Loring is innocent and helps him by setting a trap.

== Cast ==
- Bob Steele as Brick Loring
- Arletta Duncan as Jean Mullins
- Kit Guard as Spike Sullivan
- George Chesebro as Nifty Harmon
- George "Gabby" Hayes as Pete
- Charles King as Jock Malone
- Henry Roquemore as Hank
- Lafe McKee as Sheriff Jim Cosgrove
- Frank Ball as Fred Mullins
