= Mischa Auer =

Russian-American actor (1905–1967)

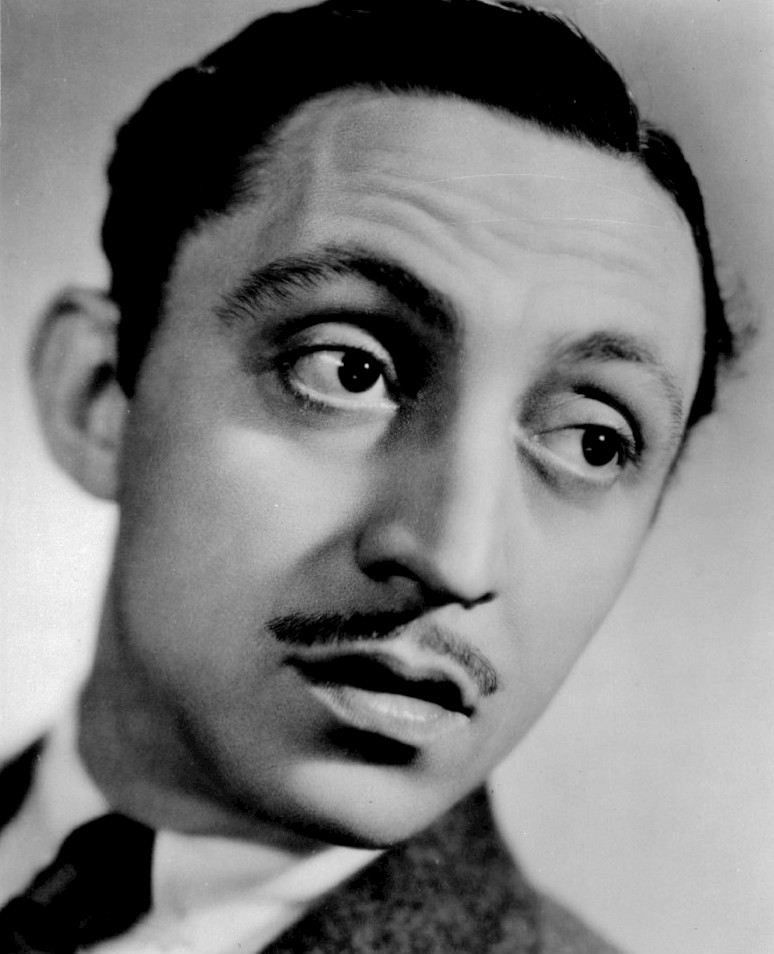
- Auer in the 1940s
- Born: Mikhail Semyonovich Unkovsky; 17 November 1905; St. Petersburg, Russian Empire
- Died: 5 March 1967 (aged 61); Rome, Italy
- Resting place: Prospect Hill Cemetery, Gloversville, New York
- Other name: Mischa Ounskowsky
- Occupation: Actor
- Years active: 1925–1967
- Spouses: Norma Tillman (m. 1931; div. 1941) Joyce Hunter (m. 1941; div. 1950) Susanne Kalish (m. 1950; div. 1957) Elsie Souls Lee (m. 1965)
- Children: 3

Mischa Auer (born Mikhail Semyonovich Unkovsky; Russian: Михаил Семёнович Унковский; 17 November 1905 – 5 March 1967) was a Russian-American actor who moved to Hollywood in the late 1920s. He first appeared in film in 1928. Auer had a long career playing in many of the era's best known films. He was nominated for the Academy Award for Best Supporting Actor in 1936 for his performance in the screwball comedy My Man Godfrey, which led to further zany comedy roles. He later moved into television and acted in films again in France and Italy well into the 1960s.

== Early life ==
Auer was born on 17 November 1905 in St. Petersburg, to a Jewish family. His name is usually seen as Mischa Ounskowsky, Mischa being the German transliteration of Misha (the diminutive form of Mikhail), and Ounskowsky being the French transliteration of his surname (with an unexplained additional "s"). Auer's father was an Imperial Russian Navy officer Semyon Ivanovich Unkovsky (1871–1921), and his mother was Zoya Lvovna Unkovskaya (née Auer), the eldest daughter of the Hungarian-born violinist Leopold Auer. Contrary to the popular belief, his father did not die when Mischa was three years old. Semyon Unkovsky left Zoya Auer and married her sister, Maria Lvovna Auer (they had a son, also named Mischa (Mikhail Unkovsky) (1904–1940), Russian actor, arrested in 1938 on counter-revolutionary charges and died in forced labour camp in Kolyma). Semyon Unkovsky retired from the Navy in 1906 and settled in Kaluga, Russia, where he died in 1921. Leopold Auer emigrated to the United States after the Russian Revolution. Mischa Auer and his mother became separated, but were reunited during the Russian Civil War. She, however, died of typhus. Auer was able to contact his grandfather, who brought him to the United States in August 1920.

== Career ==
Auer began performing on the stage in the 1920s in Bertha Kalich's Thalia Yiddish Theater, then moved to Hollywood, where he first appeared in 1928 in Something Always Happens. He appeared in several small, mostly uncredited roles into the 1930s, appearing in such films as Rasputin and the Empress, Viva Villa!, The Yellow Ticket, the George Gershwin musical Delicious, the Paramount Pictures all-star revue Paramount on Parade and The Lives of a Bengal Lancer.

In 1936, Auer was cast as Alice Brady's protégé in the comedy My Man Godfrey, for which he was nominated for the Academy Award for Best Supporting Actor. Prior to that, he had been mostly playing villains. He stated, "That one role made a comic out of me." From then on, he was regularly cast in zany comedy roles. Auer played the ballet instructor Kolenkov in the Best Picture-winning You Can't Take It with You and the prince-turned-fashion designer in Walter Wanger's Vogues of 1938. Auer can also be seen cavorting in such films as: Arsène Lupin (1932), One Hundred Men and a Girl, Hold That Ghost, Destry Rides Again, Spring Parade, Hellzapoppin', Cracked Nuts, Lady in the Dark, and Up in Mabel's Room (1944). He was also one of the large cast of And Then There Were None, and appeared in a pair of vehicles for opera singer Lily Pons.

In the 1950s, Auer appeared on several episodic television series, such as Westinghouse Desilu Playhouse, Studio One, Broadway Television Theatre and The Chevrolet Tele-Theatre. He appeared in Orson Welles's Mr. Arkadin (1955), and in the 1960s, he made several films in France and Italy, including The Christmas That Almost Wasn't.

== Personal life ==
Auer married four times and had three children. His first wife was Norma Tillman (1931–1941), whom he married in 1931. They had a son Anthony and a daughter Zoia. They divorced in 1941. In the same year, he married Joyce Hunter (4 December 1941 – 1950), his second wife, whom he lived with for 9 years. His third wife was Susanne Kalish (5 May 1950 – 1957), and they had one daughter. His fourth wife was Elise Souls Lee (1965 – 5 March 1967) who died in 1976.

== Death ==
Auer died of cardiovascular disease in Rome in 1967 and was interred at Prospect Hill Cemetery in Gloversville, New York.

== Filmography ==
Year	Title	Role	Director	Notes
1928	Something Always Happens	Clark	Frank Tuttle	
1929	Marquis Preferred	Albert	Frank Tuttle	
1929	Why Be Good?	Man Dancing at The Boiler	William A. Seiter	Uncredited
1929	The Studio Murder Mystery	Grant's Secretary	Frank Tuttle	Uncredited
1929	The Mighty	Hood	John Cromwell	Uncredited
1930	Guilty?	Minor Role		Uncredited
1930	The Benson Murder Case	Albert Brecker	Frank Tuttle	Uncredited
1930	Paramount on Parade	Thug (Murder Will Out)	Edmund Goulding and 10 other directors	Uncredited
1930	Inside the Lines	Amahdi	Roy Pomeroy	
1930	Shooting Straight	Frenchie	George Archainbaud	Uncredited
1930	Just Imagine	B-36	David Butler	
1931	The Royal Bed	Grecian Ambassador	Lowell Sherman	Uncredited
1931	No Limit	Romeo	Frank Tuttle	
1931	Command Performance	Duke Charles	Walter Lang	
1931	It Pays to Advertise	Man Putting Sign on Car	Frank Tuttle	Uncredited
1931	King of the Wild	Prince Dakka, escaped lunatic	Theodore Joos	
1931	The Drums of Jeopardy	Peter	George B. Seitz	
1931	The Spy	Man in Cafe	Berthold Viertel	
1931	Always Goodbye	Mechanic	William Cameron Menzies	Uncredited
1931	Women of All Nations	Hassan's Aide	Raoul Walsh	Uncredited
1931	Women Love Once	Oscar	Edward Goodman	
1931	The Lady from Nowhere	Rigo	Richard Thorpe	
1931	The Unholy Garden	Prince Nicolai Poliakoff	George Fitzmaurice	
1931	The Yellow Ticket	Melchior	Raoul Walsh	
1931	Working Girls	Elsie's Boyfriend	Dorothy Arzner	Uncredited
1931	Mata Hari	Firing Squad Victim	George Fitzmaurice	Uncredited
1931	Delicious	Mischa	David Butler	
1932	The Monster Walks	Hanns Krug	Frank R. Strayer	
1932	Murder at Dawn	Henry	Richard Thorpe	
1932	Sinister Hands	Swami Yomurda	Armand Schaefer	
1932	Arsène Lupin	Louvre Tour Guide	Jack Conway	Uncredited
1932	Midnight Patrol	Dummy Black	Christy Cabanne	
1932	The Last of the Mohicans	General Montcalm	B. Reeves Eason	
1932	No Greater Love	Rabbi		
1932	Beauty Parlor	Herman Bauer	Richard Thorpe	
1932	Almost Married	Russian Policeman	William Cameron Menzies	Uncredited
1932	Drifting Souls	Skeets	Louis King	
1932	The Western Code	Chapman	John P. McCarthy	
1932	Scarlet Dawn	Sergei	William Dieterle	Uncredited
1932	Call Her Savage	Agitator in Restaurant	John Francis Dillon	Uncredited
1932	The Unwritten Law	Abu Zeyd	Christy Cabanne	
1932	The Sign of the Cross	Christian in Dungeon	Cecil B. DeMille	Uncredited
1932	Rasputin and the Empress	Butler Pouring Drinks at Party	Richard Boleslawski	Uncredited
1933	Dangerously Yours	Kassim	Frank Tuttle	
1933	Clear All Wires!	Arab Leader	George Hill	Uncredited
1933	Sucker Money	Swami Yomurda	Melville Shyer	
1933	The Intruder	Wild Man	Albert Ray	
1933	Gabriel Over the White House	Mr. Thieson	Gregory La Cava	Uncredited
1933	Infernal Machine	Klein	Marcel Varnel; Martin Santell	Uncredited
1933	The Flaming Signal	Manu—High Priest	Charles E. Roberts	
1933	I Loved You Wednesday	Piano Accompanist	William Cameron Menzies	Uncredited
1933	Corruption	Volkov	Charles E. Roberts	
1933	Storm at Daybreak	Assassin	Richard Boleslawski	Uncredited
1933	Tarzan the Fearless	Eltar, High Priest of Zar	Robert F. Hill	
1933	The Way to Love	Songwriter at Piano	Norman Taurog	Uncredited
1933	After Tonight	Adjutant Lehan	George Archainbaud	
1933	Cradle Song	Village Priest	Mitchell Leisen	
1933	Girl Without a Room	Walksky	Ralph Murphy	
1934	Moulin Rouge	Sculptor	Sidney Lanfield	scenes deleted
1934	The Crosby Case	DeCobra	Edwin L. Marin	Uncredited
1934	Wharf Angel	Sadik	George Somnes	
1934	The Woman Condemned	Dr. Wagner	Dorothy Davenport	
1934	Viva Villa!	Military Attaché	William Wellman	Uncredited
1934	The Trumpet Blows		Stephen Roberts	
1934	Change of Heart	Smith	John G. Blystone	Uncredited
1934	Stamboul Quest		Sam Wood; Jack Conway (uncredited)	
1934	Beyond the Law	Tully	D. Ross Lederman	
1934	Bulldog Drummond Strikes Back	Hassan	Roy Del Ruth	
1934	Student Tour	Sikh Cop	Charles Reisner	Uncredited
1935	Biography of a Bachelor Girl	Mr. Rabinowitz	Edward H. Griffith	Uncredited
1935	The Lives of a Bengal Lancer	Captured Afridi	Henry Hathaway	Uncredited
1935	Mystery Woman	Dmitri	Eugene Forde	
1935	Clive of India	King Suraj Ud Dowlah	Richard Boleslawski	
1935	Murder in the Fleet	Kamchukan consul	Edward Sedgwick	
1935	The Adventures of Rex and Rinty	Tanaga [Chs. 1, 4, 8, 10-12]	B. Reeves Eason	Serial
1935	The Crusades	Monk	Cecil B. DeMille	
1935	Anna Karenina	Mahotin	Clarence Brown	Uncredited
1935	Condemned to Live	Zan	Frank R. Strayer	
1935	I Dream Too Much	Darcy's Pianist	John Cromwell	
1935	We're Only Human	William 'Lefty' Berger	James Flood; Clem Beauchamp (assistant)	Uncredited
1936	Tough Guy	Chi	Chester Franklin	
1936	Here Comes Trouble		Lewis Seiler	
1936	The House of a Thousand Candles	Victor Demetrius	Arthur Lubin	
1936	Sons o' Guns	German Spy	Lloyd Bacon	
1936	One Rainy Afternoon	Leading man	Rowland V. Lee	
1936	The Princess Comes Across	Inspector Morevitch	William K. Howard	
1936	My Man Godfrey	Carlo	Gregory La Cava	
1936	The Gay Desperado	Diego	Rouben Mamoulian	
1936	Winterset	A radical	Alfred Santell	
1936	College Holiday	Ticket Taker at Door	Frank Tuttle	Uncredited
1936	Three Smart Girls	Count Arisztid	Henry Koster	
1936	That Girl from Paris	Butch	Leigh Jason	
1937	Top of the Town	Hamlet	Walter Lang	
1937	We Have Our Moments	Capt. Enrico Mussetti	Alfred L. Werker	
1937	Pick a Star	Rinaldo Lopez	Edward Sedgwick	
1937	Marry the Girl	Dimitri Kyeff	William C. McGann	
1937	It's All Yours	Baron Rene de Montigny	Elliott Nugent	
1937	Walter Wanger's Vogues of 1938	Prince Muratov	Irving Cummings; Charles Kerr (assistant)	
1937	One Hundred Men and a Girl	Michael Borodoff	Henry Koster	
1937	Merry-Go-Round of 1938	Mischa		
1937	Prescription for Romance	Count Sandor	S. Sylvan Simon	
1938	The Rage of Paris	Mike Lebedovich	Henry Koster	
1938	You Can't Take It with You	Potap Kolenkhov	Frank Capra	
1938	Service de Luxe	Serge Bebenko	Rowland V. Lee	
1938	Little Tough Guys in Society	Dr. Trenkle	Erle C. Kenton	
1938	Sweethearts	Leo Kronk	W.S. Van Dyke	
1939	East Side of Heaven	Nicky	David Butler	
1939	Unexpected Father	Boris Bebenko	Charles Lamont	
1939	Destry Rides Again	Boris Callahan	George Marshall	
1940	Alias the Deacon	Andre	Christy Cabanne	
1940	Sandy Is a Lady	Felix Lobo Smith	Charles Lamont	
1940	Public Deb No. 1	Grisha	Gregory Ratoff	
1940	Spring Parade	Gustav	Henry Koster	
1940	Margie	Gomez	Paul Gerard Smith	
1940	Seven Sinners	Sasha Mencken	Tay Garnett	
1940	Trail of the Vigilantes	Bolo		
1941	The Flame of New Orleans	Zolotov	René Clair	
1941	Cracked Nuts	Boris Kabikoff	Edward F. Cline	
1941	Hold That Ghost	Gregory	Arthur Lubin	
1941	Sing Another Chorus	Stanislaus	Charles Lamont	
1941	Moonlight in Hawaii	'Clipper' Canovan	Charles Lamont	
1941	Hellzapoppin'	Pepi	H. C. Potter; Joseph A. McDonough (assistant); Edward F. Cline (additional comedy scenes)	
1942	Don't Get Personal	Stainslaus Noodnick a.k.a. Charlie	Charles Lamont	
1942	Twin Beds	Nicolai Cherupin	Tim Whelan	
1943	Around The World	Himself	Allan Dwan; Harry Scott (assistant)	
1944	Lady in the Dark	Russell Paxton	Mitchell Leisen	
1944	Up in Mabel's Room	Boris	Allan Dwan	
1945	A Royal Scandal	Captain Sukov	Ernst Lubitsch	
1945	Brewster's Millions	Michael Michaelovich	Allan Dwan	
1945	And Then There Were None	Prince Nikita Starloff	René Clair	
1946	Sentimental Journey	Gregory Petrovich Rogozhin	Walter Lang	
1946	She Wrote the Book	Joe	Charles Lamont	
1947	For You I Die	Alec Shaw	John Reinhardt	
1948	Sofia	Ali Imagu	John Reinhardt	
1949	A Night of Fame	Bernard Stork	Steno	
1949	Snow White and the Seven Thieves	Mirko	Giacomo Gentilomo	
1950	Vivere a sbafo	Il Cavalier Pippo Berlocco		
1952	Song of Paris	Comte Marcel de Sarliac	John Guillermin	
1954	Service Entrance	Nicolas Pouchkoff	Carlo Rim	
1955	School for Love	Berger	Marc Allégret	
1955	Frou-Frou	Grand Duke Alexis	Augusto Genina	
1955	L'impossible Monsieur Pipelet	The unsuccessful writer, a lodger	André Hunebelle	
1955	Mr. Arkadin	the Professor	Orson Welles	
1955	La pícara molinera	el corregidor		
1955	Thirteen at the Table	Badabof	André Hunebelle	
1956	Naughty Girl	Igor the ballet master	Michel Boisrond	
1956	Trois de la Canebière	Garopoulos		
1956	Mannequins of Paris	Yaschlik		
1956	Plucking the Daisy	Alexis the taxi driver	Marc Allégret	Uncredited
1956	The Monte Carlo Story	Hector, the Maitre D'	Samuel A. Taylor	
1957	La polka des menottes	Charles Magne		
1957	Nathalie	Cyril Boran		
1958	Tabarin	Boris	Richard Pottier	
1958	Le tombeur	M. Pedro Olivaro		
1958	Sacrée Jeunesse	Prof. Koranoff		
1958	A Dog, a Mouse, and a Sputnik	Professor Papov	Jean Dréville	
1962	We Joined the Navy	Colonel & President	Wendy Toye	
1963	The King's Breakfast	Master of the king's music		Short
1963	Les femmes d'abord	Le baron Lionel de Balconi		
1964	Cleopazza	Produttore Strombic		
1964	Queste pazze pazze donne	The Psychiatrist		
1964	Clémentine chérie	Le décorateur		
1964	I due mafiosi	Mischa	Giorgio Simonelli	
1964	What Ever Happened to Baby Toto?	Count Mischa	Ottavio Alessi	
1966	The Christmas That Almost Wasn't	Jonathan, the elf foreman	Rossano Brazzi	
1966	Drop Dead Darling	Romeo	Ken Hughes	
1967	Per amore... per magia...	Magrebì, Grand Duke of Forilarì	Duccio Tessari	(final film role)

== See also ==
- List of Russian Americans
- List of Russian Academy Award winners and nominees
- List of actors with Academy Award nominations
