= Margie (1940 film) =

- Theatrical release poster
- Directed by: Otis Garrett; Paul Gerard Smith
- Screenplay by: Erna Lazarus; Scott Darling; Paul Gerard Smith
- Story by: Erna Lazarus; Scott Darling
- Produced by: Joseph Gershenson
- Starring: Tom Brown; Nan Grey; Mischa Auer; Joy Hodges; Edgar Kennedy; Allen Jenkins; Eddie Quillan; Wally Vernon
- Cinematography: Stanley Cortez
- Edited by: Ted J. Kent
- Music by: Charles Previn>br>H. J. Salter
- Production company: Universal Pictures
- Distributed by: Universal Pictures
- Release date: December 6, 1940
- Running time: 59 minutes
- Country: United States
- Language: English

Margie is a 1940 American comedy film directed by Otis Garrett and Paul Gerard Smith and written by Erna Lazarus, Scott Darling and Paul Gerard Smith. The film stars Tom Brown, Nan Grey, Mischa Auer, Joy Hodges, Edgar Kennedy, Allen Jenkins, Eddie Quillan and Wally Vernon. The film was released on December 6, 1940, by Universal Pictures.

== Cast ==
- Tom Brown as Bret
- Nan Grey as Margie
- Mischa Auer as Gomez
- Joy Hodges as Ruth
- Edgar Kennedy as Chauncey
- Allen Jenkins as Kenneth
- Eddie Quillan as Joe
- Wally Vernon as Al
- Richard Lane as Mr. Dixon
- Emmett Vogan as Mr. White
- Pauline Haddon as Miss Walter
- David Oliver as Waiter
- Frank Faylen as Mr. Leffingwell
- John Sheehan as Mr. Cladwell
- Effie Laird as Mrs. Horstwalder
- Horace McMahon as Detective
- Ralph Peters as Detective
- Aileen Carlyle as Mrs. Gypsum-Weed
- Edward McWade as Pinwinkle
- Gene Collins as Ethridge
