= Gene Fowler =

American journalist, author and screenwriter

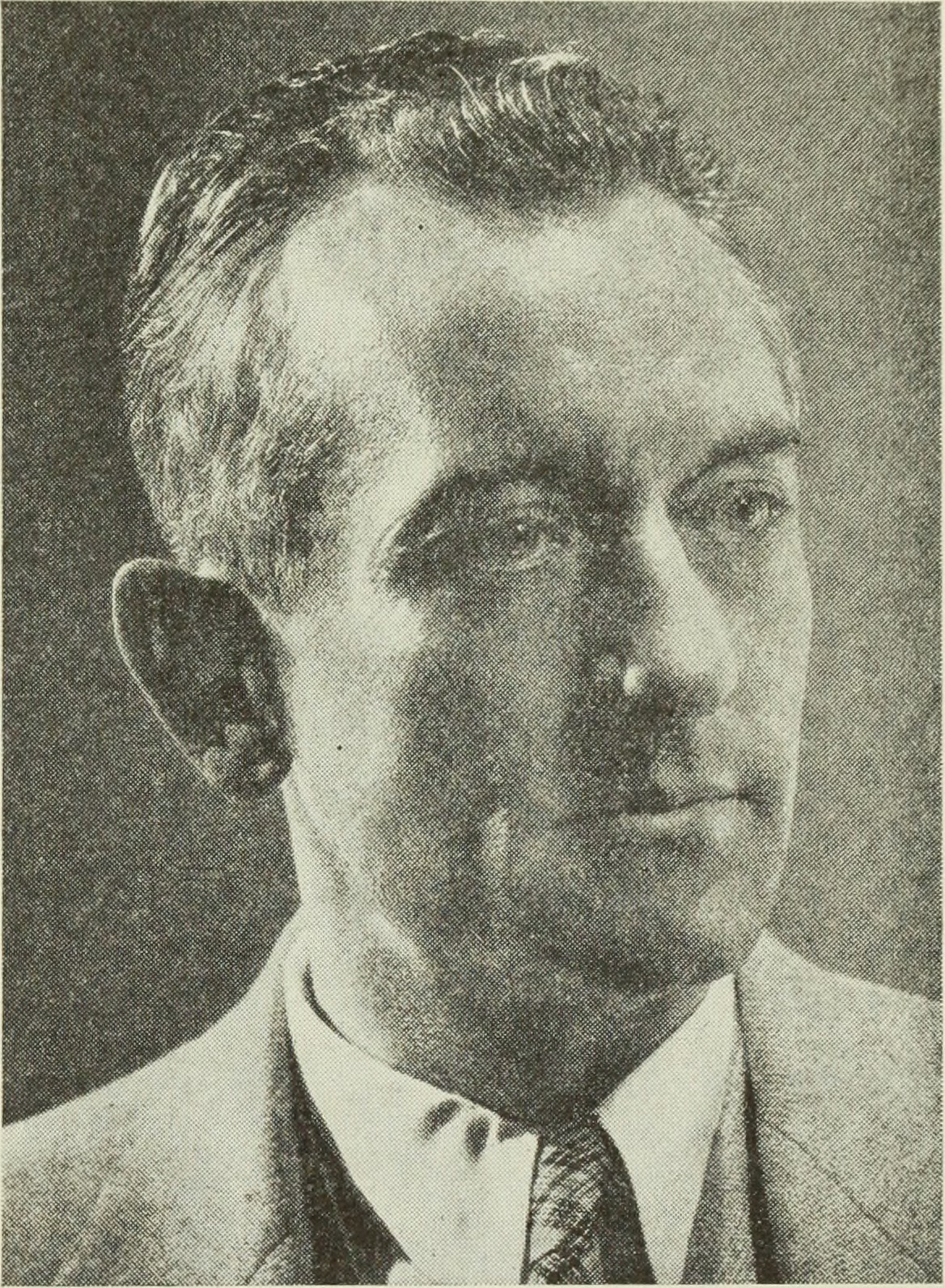
- Born: Eugene Devlan; March 8, 1890; Denver, Colorado, U.S.
- Died: July 2, 1960 (aged 70); West Los Angeles, California, U.S.
- Occupations: Journalist, author, screenwriter
- Spouse: Agnes Hubbard
- Children: 3, including Gene Fowler Jr.

Gene Fowler (born Eugene Devlan) (March 8, 1890 – July 2, 1960) was an American journalist, author, and dramatist.

== Biography ==
Fowler was born in Denver, Colorado, to Dora Grace Wheeler, age 18, and Charles Frances Devlan Jr., age 22. When his mother remarried during his youth, he took his stepfather's name to become Gene Fowler. Fowler's career had a false start in taxidermy, which he later claimed gave him a permanent distaste for red meat. After a year at the University of Colorado, he took a job with The Denver Post. His assignments included an interview with the frontiersman and Wild West Show promoter Buffalo Bill Cody. He established his trademark impertinence by questioning Cody about his many love affairs. He was also known for his racy, readable content and for the speed of his writing.

He left Denver for Chicago and met Ben Hecht and Charles MacArthur. He eventually moved to New York where Fowler worked for the New York Daily Mirror, New York Evening Journal and as managing editor of the New York American and The Morning Telegraph. At The New York American he worked closely with Eddie Doherty, who became a lifelong friend, and whom Fowler promoted to city editor. At The Morning Telegraph his staff included Hecht, MacArthur, Ring Lardner, Westbrook Pegler, Martha Ostenso, Walter Winchell and Nellie Revell. He was also newspaper syndication manager for King Features.

He began writing books and his third, The Great Mouthpiece, about the attorney William J. Fallon, became a bestseller and got him noticed by Hollywood where he became one of the highest paid screenwriters. His work included more than a dozen screenplays, mostly written in the 1930s, including What Price Hollywood? (1932), The Call of the Wild (1935) and Billy the Kid (1941). He collaborated with Bess Meredyth on a stage play, The Mighty Barnum, which was later filmed, and also with Ben Hecht on the play The Great Magoo.

During his years in Hollywood, Fowler became close to such celebrities as John Barrymore and W. C. Fields. Fields, whose animus toward children is legendary, claimed that Fowler's sons were the only children he could stand. He wrote a biography of Barrymore as well as Mack Sennett, Jimmy Durante and New York City mayor Jimmy Walker.

In 1916, Fowler married Agnes Hubbard, and they had three children, the eldest of whom was Gene Fowler Jr. (1917–1998), a prominent Hollywood film editor (whose work included It's a Mad, Mad, Mad, Mad World and Hang 'Em High) and a sometime director (1957's I Was a Teenage Werewolf as well as numerous television programs). Their other children were Jane and Will.

Fowler died in West Los Angeles, California, aged 70 of a heart attack. Fowler had been writing a book based on his time as a New York newspaperman for over 5 years and had almost completed it before his death. The book, Skyline, was published posthumously.

== Anecdotes ==
Fowler was the subject of many colorful anecdotes. One told by his son Will, concerns a scene outside of John Barrymore's hospital room in May 1942.

A stranger entered the waiting room where [John] Decker and Fowler were sitting with reporters. "I am a healer," cried the stranger. "Just give me three minutes with Mr. Barrymore and I will cure him!" There was a moment of silence until Fowler arose, snatched the seemingly demented fellow by the scruff of his collar and threw him down the stairs, calling after him, "Physician, heal thyself!"

Fowler was present at Barrymore's death, and he claimed (perhaps not seriously) that Barrymore's last words, spoken to Fowler, were: "Is it true that you're the illegitimate son of Buffalo Bill?"

== Memorable quotations ==
Fowler wrote many witticisms both spoken and written. Two regarding the art of writing might suffice:

- "Writing is easy. All you do is stare at a blank sheet of paper until drops of blood form on your forehead."
- "The best way to become a successful writer is to read good writing, remember it, and then forget where you remember it from."

== Personal life ==
He married Agnes Hubbard (1890–1970), the niece of Omar Nelson Bradley, in 1916. According to journalist Eddie Doherty, who was married to Servant of God Catherine Doherty and cofounded the Madonna House Apostolate, Fowler converted to Catholicism while he was writing his 1952 book, My Hay Ain't In. This was confirmed by an article in The St. Louis Review, the official newspaper of the archdiocese of St. Louis, adding that the date was June 8, 1950. His funeral was at St. Martin of Tours church in Los Angeles, and he is buried in Holy Cross cemetery.

== Books ==
- Trumpet in the Dust. NY: Horace Liveright, 1930. [semi-autobiographical novel about a newspaperman]
- Shoe the Wild Mare. NY: Horace Liveright, 1931. [novel]
- The Great Mouthpiece: The Life of William J. Fallon. NY: Covici-Friede, 1931.
- The Demi-Wang, by “Peter Long” (pseud.). Privately printed for subscribers, 1931. [erotica]
- Timber Line: A Story of Bonfils and Tammen. NY: Covici-Friede, 1933. [a biography of The Denver Post, also a memoir]
- The Great Magoo (co-authored with Ben Hecht). NY: Covici-Friede, 1933. [a play in 3 acts]
- Father Goose: The Story of Mack Sennett. NY: Covici-Friede, 1934.
- The Mighty Barnum: A Screenplay (co-authored with Bess Meredyth). NY: Covici-Friede, 1934. [filmed by 20th Century Pictures, 1934]
- Salute to Yesterday. NY: Random House, 1937. [novel about Denver in the late 19th and early 20th centuries]
- Illusion in Java. NY: Random House, 1939. [novel]
- The Jervis Bay Goes Down. NY: Random House, 1941. [narrative poem]
- Good Night, Sweet Prince: The Life and Times of John Barrymore. NY: The Viking Press, 1944.
- A Solo in Tom-Toms. NY: Viking, 1946. [memoir of his early life in Colorado]
- Beau James: The Life and Times of Jimmy Walker. NY: The Viking Press, 1949.
- Schnozzola: The Story of Jimmy Durante. NY: The Viking Press, 1951.
- Minutes of the Last Meeting. NY; Random House, 1954. [a portrait of some of his associates in Hollywood, notably critic and poet Sadakichi Hartmann; also featuring W.C. Fields, John Barrymore and artist John Decker]
- Skyline: A Reporter’s Reminiscence of the 1920s. NY: The Viking Press, 1961. [memoir]

== Screenplays ==
Fowler wrote or co-wrote screenplays for the following movies (partial list).

- What Price Hollywood? (1932)
- State's Attorney (1932)
- The Way to Love (1933)
- The Mighty Barnum (1934)
- Twentieth Century (1934)
- The Call of the Wild (1935)
- Professional Soldier (1934)
- Career Woman (1936) (story)
- Half Angel (1936)
- A Message to Garcia (1936)
- White Fang (1936)
- Ali Baba Goes to Town (1937) (story)
- Love Under Fire (1937)
- Nancy Steele Is Missing! (1937)
- The Earl of Chicago (1940) (story)
- Billy the Kid (1941)
- Big Jack (1949)

Other of his works that became the basis for films include his stage play The Great Magoo (1932), which was filmed as Shoot the Works (1934), and the book Beau James: The Life & Times of Jimmy Walker, which was the basis for Beau James (1957). Beau James in turn became the basis for the Broadway musical Jimmy (1969).

== Sources ==
- Gene Fowler at IMDb
- Gene Fowler Quotes
- Will Fowler, The Second Handshake, Secaucus, New Jersey: Lyle Stuart Inc., 1980.
