= Under Age (1941 film) =

1941 film

- Film poster
- Directed by: Edward Dmytryk
- Written by: Robert Hardy Andrews; Stanley Roberts
- Produced by: Ralph Cohn
- Starring: Nan Grey; Alan Baxter; Mary Anderson; Tom Neal
- Cinematography: John Stumar
- Edited by: Richard Fantl
- Production company: Columbia Pictures
- Distributed by: Columbia Pictures
- Release date: April 24, 1941
- Running time: 59 minutes
- Country: United States
- Language: English

Under Age is a 1941 American crime film directed by Edward Dmytryk and starring Nan Grey, Alan Baxter, Mary Anderson, and Tom Neal. It was produced and distributed by Columbia Pictures.

== Plot ==
Sisters Jane and Edie Baird are arrested for vagrancy, having no place to sleep. They are later released from jail and immediately contacted by the local pimp gangster, Tap Manson, who wants them to work as hostesses for a company called "House by the side of the road, Inc.". It is a franchise of motels by the highway roadsides. Head of the company is Mrs. Burke, an old, hardened gangster of a woman who has a deceivingly kind appearance.

At first the sisters try to find other jobs, but their search leads nowhere. Eventually they meet with Mrs. Burke and gets hired as hostesses at House 42, one of the motels that is located somewhere in the Midwest. Manson takes them there, together with three other unfortunate girls.

Their job is to walk along the highway, pretend to be hitchhikers and lure the drivers in to the combined motel, bar and restaurant. Jane manages to get a ride with Rocky Stone, who understands about the hitchhiking scam but agrees to take Jane anyway.

Upon Rocky's arrival to the motel, Manson learns that he has jewels worth $60,000 in his car, and steals them. Rocky believes Jane has taken the jewels and confronts her. After the confrontation, Jane is called in to Mrs. Burke for questioning, and because she doesn't leave the desired answers, she is beaten by the mean old lady.

When Edie finds out about her sister's misfortune she decides to take her vengeance on Manson, who tricked them into working at the motel. Unfortunately her plan is overheard by one of the other girls, Rhoda, who reports to Manson. Edie is run over by Manson in his car. Jane is devastated over her sister's death and turns to Rocky for help. They get Manson to admit he killed Edie and confess to the racket Mrs. Burke is running. The two gangsters are then convicted of their crimes in a court of law, and Rocky takes care of Jane, who he has grown fond of.

== Cast ==
- Nan Grey as Jane Baird
- Alan Baxter as Tap Manson
- Mary Anderson as Edie Baird
- Tom Neal as Rocky Stone
- Leona Maricle as Mrs. Burke aka The Widow
- Don Beddoe as Albert Ward
- Yolande Donlan as Lily Fletcher (as Yolande Mallott)
- Jack Perrin as Grant (as Richard Terry)
- Marlo Dwyer as Rhoda (as Wilma Francis)
- Patti McCarty as Minnie
- Billie Roy as Boots
- Gwen Kenyon as Gladys
- Barbara Kent as Jackie
