= Fast Companions =

1932 film

- Directed by: Kurt Neumann
- Written by: Gerald Beaumont; Charles Logue; Clarence Marks; Earle Snell
- Produced by: Carl Laemmle Jr.
- Starring: Tom Brown; Maureen O'Sullivan; James Gleason
- Cinematography: Arthur Edeson
- Edited by: Philip Cahn
- Production company: Universal Pictures
- Distributed by: Universal Pictures
- Release date: June 23, 1932
- Running time: 71 minutes
- Country: United States
- Language: English

Fast Companions is a 1932 American pre-Code sports drama film directed by Kurt Neumann and starring Tom Brown, Maureen O'Sullivan and James Gleason.

== Cast ==
- Tom Brown as Marty Black
- Maureen O'Sullivan as Sally
- James Gleason as Silk Henley
- Andy Devine as Information Kid
- Mickey Rooney as Midge
- Morgan Wallace as Cueball Kelly
- Berton Churchill as committee chairman
- Edgar Kennedy as cop
- Russell Hopton as unidentified character
- Arletta Duncan as unidentified character

== See also ==
- List of films about horses
- List of films about horse racing

== Bibliography ==
- Quinlan, David. The Film Lover's Companion: An A to Z Guide to 2,000 Stars and the Movies They Made. Carol Publishing Group, 1997.
