= Crash Donovan =

1936 film

- Directed by: William Nigh; Jean Negulesco
- Written by: Karl Detzer; Charles Grayson; Marjorie Klein; Harold Shumate; Eugene Solow
- Produced by: Julius Bernheim
- Starring: Jack Holt; John 'Dusty' King; Nan Grey
- Cinematography: Milton R. Krasner
- Edited by: Hanson T. Fritch; Byron Robinson
- Music by: Herman Heller
- Production company: Universal Pictures
- Distributed by: Universal Pictures
- Release date: August 1, 1936
- Running time: 70 minutes
- Country: United States
- Language: English

Crash Donovan is a 1936 American drama film directed by William Nigh and Jean Negulesco and starring Jack Holt, John 'Dusty' King and Nan Grey. It marked the directorial debut of the Romanian-born Negulesco.

== Partial cast ==
- Jack Holt as 'Crash' Donovan
- John 'Dusty' King as Johnny Allen
- Nan Grey as Doris Tennyson
- Eddie Acuff as Alabam
- Hugh Buckler as Captain Tennyson
- Ward Bond as The Drill Master
- James Donlan as Smokey
- Douglas Fowley as Harris
- William Tannen as Tony
- Huey White as Fizz
- Al Hill as Mike
- Gardner James as Pete
- Paul Porcasi as Cafe Owner

== Bibliography ==
- Michael Schlossheimer. Gunmen and Gangsters: Profiles of Nine Actors Who Portrayed Memorable Screen Tough Guys. McFarland, 2001.
