= Mile-a-Minute-Love =

1937 film

Mile-a-Minute-Love (aka Crime Afloat)
- Directed by: Elmer Clifton
- Written by: Duncan Renaldo
- Produced by: Fanchon Royer
- Starring: Duncan Renaldo
- Cinematography: Arthur Martinelli
- Edited by: Edward Schroeder
- Distributed by: Fanchon Royer Productions Inc.
- Release date: 1937
- Running time: 67 minutes
- Country: United States
- Language: English

Mile-a-Minute-Love is a 1937 American drama film written by Duncan Renaldo who also stars as phony Spanish Count Ribalto.

== Plot ==
The ersatz Spanish Count Ribalto steals a racing boat and swindles Wynne Drexel out of $100,000. When Bob solves the crimes and gets Drexel's money back, she marries him.

== Cast ==
- Duncan Renaldo as Count Ribalto
- William Bakewell as Bob
- Arletta Duncan as Wynne Drexel
