= Kismet (1930 film) =

1930 film

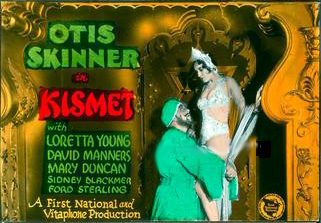
- Lantern slide
- Directed by: John Francis Dillon
- Written by: Howard Estabrook
- Based on: Kismet; 1911 play by Edward Knoblock
- Produced by: Robert North
- Starring: Otis Skinner; Loretta Young; David Manners; Sidney Blackmer
- Cinematography: John F. Seitz
- Edited by: Alexander Hall
- Music by: Leon Rosebrook; Edward Ward
- Production companies: First National Pictures; The Vitaphone Corp.
- Distributed by: Warner Bros. Pictures, Inc.
- Release date: October 30, 1930
- Running time: 90 minutes
- Country: United States
- Language: English
- Budget: $611,000
- Box office: $462,000

Kismet is a 1930 American pre-Code musical costume drama film photographed entirely in an early widescreen process using 65mm film that Warner Bros. Pictures called Vitascope and featuring Technicolor sequences. The film, now considered lost, was based on Edward Knoblock's play Kismet, and was previously filmed as a silent film in 1920 which also starred Otis Skinner.

== Plot ==
Hajj, a rascally beggar on the periphery of the court of Baghdad, schemes to marry his daughter to royalty and to win the heart of the queen of the castle himself.

== Cast ==
- Otis Skinner as Hajj
- Loretta Young as Marsinah
- David Manners as Caliph Abdallah
- Sidney Blackmer as Wazir Mansur
- Mary Duncan as Zeleekha
- Montagu Love as The Jailer
- Ford Sterling as Amru
- Theodore von Eltz as The Guide Nazir
- John St. Polis as The Imam Mahmud
- Edmund Breese as Jawan
- Blanche Friderici as Narjis (credited as Blanche Frederici)
- Richard Carlyle as The Muezzin
- John Sheehan as Kazim
- Otto Hoffman as Azaf

== Music ==
The music for the film was composed by Eddie Ward with lyrics by Alfred Bryan. Songs included a theme song entitled "Kismet" and a song entitled "My Father’s Love Is All" as well as an untitled instrumental dance and a finale sung by a chorus of the title song.

== Production ==
Warner Bros. spared no expense in making this picture. They spent $600,000 in producing it, and the extravagance of the film was noted by every reviewer. The film played in ten cities across the United States in the wide-screen Vitascope (65mm) version, while the rest of the country (which did not yet have theaters capable of playing widescreen films) were provided with standard 35mm prints. Otis Skinner was 73 years old while lead actress Loretta Young was 17 years old.

== Box office ==
According to Warner Bros. records, the film earned $315,000 domestic and $147,000 foreign.

== Preservation status ==
The enormous amount of pre-Code content (especially in the sequences in the harem) has probably contributed to the film's "lost" status.

Two remakes, both in color, were made of the film, one in 1944 and the other in 1955. The 1955 version was an adaptation of the hit Broadway musical based on the play. Some sources claim that the original 1930 film featured Technicolor sequences. The film is considered lost, while the complete soundtrack of the film survives on Vitaphone disks. An outtake of the production does exist and can be seen.

== Foreign-language version ==
1931 German-language version

One foreign-language version of the 1930 version of Kismet was made. The German version, also titled Kismet, was directed by William Dieterle, and was released in 1931. It starred Gustav Fröhlich, Dita Parlo and Vladimir Sokoloff.

== See also ==
- List of lost films
- List of incomplete or partially lost films
- Widescreen

== Bibliography ==
- Waldman, Harry. Missing Reels: Lost Films of American and European Cinema. McFarland, 2000.
