= Those We Love (radio series) =

American radio soap opera

Those We Love is an American radio soap opera that began on January 4, 1938, and ended on April 1, 1945.

== Background ==
Those We Love replaced Husbands and Wives, beginning January 4, 1938. The manufacturers of Ponds Cream sought, via the company's advertising agency, "a prime-time serial that would depict the contemporary American domestic scene". Agnes Ridgway, who had written one-act dramas for the Rudy Vallee Hour was signed to write the program's scripts. Nan Grey, the 24th actress to audition for the lead role, was selected to portray Kathy Marshall. Grey's signing was the first time a radio program's sponsor obtained the services of an actor or actress directly via a film studio. (Universal had an exclusive contract with Grey.) Grey's agent, three attorneys, Ponds representatives, and Universal representatives worked a day and a night to come up with a nine-page, single-spaced contract for Grey.

== Premise ==
Those We Love focused on the Marshall family in Westbridge, Connecticut. Attorney and widower John Marshall headed the family. Daughter Kathy and son Kit were twins in their early 20s. Marshall hoped that Kit would become a part of his law firm, but the son had more interest in flying. Kathy's main love interest was Dr. Leslie Foster, but their relationship was complicated when Foster's wife (who had been thought to be dead) returned but was killed trying to kidnap his daughter.

Other characters in the program included

- Aunt Emily Mayfield, sister of the dead Mrs. Marshall, who managed the family home.
- Allen McCree, who was a prospective husband for Kathy until his character flaws emerged
- Amy Foster, the doctor's daughter
- Elaine Dascomb, who worked for Foster and was almost killed by his wife.
- David Adair, an architect who is one of Kathy's suitors
- Ed Neely, who was at odds with John Marshall, primarily because of suspicions that he committed real-estate fraud

The show's theme song was "Weeping Willow".

== Personnel ==
Actors and actresses on Those We Love included those shown in the table below.

Characters and Actors on Those We Love
| Character | Actor |
|---|---|
| Kathy Marshall | Nan Grey |
| Dr. Leslie Foster | Donald Woods |
| Elaine Dascomb | Helen Wood; Jean Rogers |
| Martha | Virginia Sale |
| Mr. Fairweather | Herman Waldman |
| Aunt Emily | Alma Kruger |
| Kit | Richard Cromwell; Bill Henry |
| John Marshall | Pedro de Cordoba; Hugh Sothern; Oscar O'Shea; Francis X. Bushman |
| Amy | Priscilla Lyon; Ann Todd |
| Allen McCrea | Owen Davis Jr. |
| David Adair | Robert Cummings |
| Ed Neely | Lou Merrill |
| Lydia Dennison | Anne Stone |
| Jerry Payne | Victor Rodman |
| Mrs. Emmett | Mary Gordon |

== Listener dissatisfaction ==
Those We Love developed a group of loyal listeners who became dissatisfied as sponsors changed days and times of broadcasts, changed networks, and sometimes took the program off the air with no notice. After CBS canceled the program "because of supposed low ratings", listeners let their feeling be known by putting their protest in written form to the extent that "the studio and sponsors found themselves delubed with protesting mail from fans and embroiled in a feud with the people". Threats of contacting the Federal Communications Commission were also expressed. As a result, the program returned to the air for a year, but by the end of five years from its debut it had been on for a total of three years.

== Schedule and sponsors ==
Broadcast Schedule and Sponsors for Those We Love
| Beginning Date | Ending Date | Time | Day | Network | Sponsor |
|---|---|---|---|---|---|
| January 4, 1938 | March 1938 | 8 p.m. | Tuesday | Blue | Ponds Cream |
| March 1938 | March 27, 1939 | 8:30 p.m. | Monday | Blue | Ponds Cream |
| October 5, 1939 | March 28, 1940 | 8:30 p.m. | Thursday | NBC | Royal Gelatin |
| September 16, 1940 | June 23, 1941 | 8 p.m. | Monday | CBS | Teel dentifrice |
| July 1, 1942* | September 23, 1942 | 9 p.m. | Wednesday | NBC | Sal Hepatica |
| October 11, 1942 | May 30, 1943 | 2 p.m. | Sunday | CBS | General Foods |
| June 6, 1943** | October 3, 1943 | 7 p.m. | Sunday | NBC | Grape Nuts |
| October 10, 1943 | June 22, 1944 | 2 p.m. | Sunday | NBC | General Foods |
| June 29, 1944*** | August 24, 1944 | 8 p.m. | Thursday | NBC | General Foods |
| October 8, 1944 | April 1, 1945 | 2 p.m. | Sunday | NBC | Sanka coffee |

*Summer replacement for Eddie Cantor's program.
**Summer replacement for Jack Benny's program.
***Summer replacement for Maxwell House Coffee Time

== Critical reception ==
A review in the trade publication Variety described the program as "distinctly night-time in caliber", which it attributed to the quality of "writing that supplies the lines with lift". It added, "Miss Ridgway's Scripting has always been as superior as the ozone ever offered".
