= The Unwritten Law (1932 film) =

American mystery film directed by Christy Cabanne

- Directed by: Christy Cabanne
- Screenplay by: Edward T. Lowe
- Story by: John W. Krafft
- Produced by: Larry Darmour
- Starring: Greta Nissen; Richard "Skeets" Gallagher; Mary Brian
- Cinematography: Ira Morgan
- Edited by: Otis Garrett
- Music by: Lee Zahler
- Production company: Larry Darmour Productions
- Distributed by: Majestic Pictures
- Release date: November 15, 1932
- Running time: 70 minutes
- Country: United States
- Language: English

The Unwritten Law is a 1932 American pre-Code mystery film directed by Christy Cabanne and starring Greta Nissen, Richard "Skeets" Gallagher, and Mary Brian. It was distributed by the independent Majestic Pictures.

== Synopsis ==
A film crew board a liner to head overseas for some location shooting. While on board the film's producer is murdered, with many different members of the cast and crew having motives to kill him.

== Cast ==
- Greta Nissen as Fifi La Rue
- Richard "Skeets" Gallagher as Pete Brown
- Mary Brian as Ruth Evans
- Louise Fazenda as Lulu Potts
- Lew Cody as Roger Morgan
- Hedda Hopper as Jean Evans
- Purnell Pratt as Stephen McBain
- Theodore Von Eltz as Val Lewis
- Mischa Auer as Abu Zeyd
- Arthur Rankin as Frank Woods

== Bibliography ==
- Pitts, Michael R. Poverty Row Studios, 1929-1940: An Illustrated History of 55 Independent Film Companies, with a Filmography for Each. McFarland & Company, 2005.
- Wollstein, Hans J. . Strangers in Hollywood: the History of Scandinavian Actors in American Films from 1910 to World War II. Scarecrow Press, 1994.
