= Sea Spoilers =

1936 film

- Film poster
- Directed by: Frank R. Strayer (as Frank Strayer)
- Screenplay by: George Waggner (as George Waggoner)
- Story by: Dorrell McGowan; Stuart E. McGowan
- Produced by: Trem Carr; Paul Malvern
- Starring: John Wayne; Nan Grey; Fuzzy Knight; William Bakewell
- Cinematography: Edward Snyder; Archie Stout
- Edited by: Hanson T. Fritch (as Hanson Fritch); Ray H. Lockert (as Ray Lockert)
- Production company: Universal Pictures
- Distributed by: Universal Pictures
- Release date: September 28, 1936
- Running time: 63 minutes
- Country: United States
- Language: English

Sea Spoilers is a 1936 American drama mystery film directed by Frank R. Strayer and starring John Wayne.

== Plot ==
A Coast Guardsman must rescue his kidnapped girlfriend from smugglers willing to kill in order to maintain their illegal trade in seal skins. Along the way, he has to overcome a less-than-competent superior officer and being kidnapped by the smugglers.

== Cast ==
- John Wayne as "Bos'n" Bob Randall
- Nan Grey as Connie Dawson
- William Bakewell as Lieut. Commander Mays
- Fuzzy Knight as Hogan
- Russell Hicks as Phil Morgan
- George Irving as Commander Mays
- Lotus Long as Marie
- Harry J. Worth as Nick Austin
- Ernest Hilliard as Reggie
- George Humbert as Johnny "Hop-Scotch"
- Ethan Laidlaw as Louie
- Chester Gan as Oil
- Cy Kendall as Detective
- Harrison Greene as Fats

== See also ==
- John Wayne filmography
