= Johnny Doughboy =

1942 film by John H. Auer

- Theatrical release poster
- Directed by: John H. Auer
- Written by: Lawrence Kimble (screenplay); Frederick Kohner (original story)
- Produced by: John H. Auer
- Starring: Jane Withers; Henry Wilcoxon; Patrick Brook; William Demarest; Ruth Donnelly; Bobby Breen; Baby Sandy; Carl Switzer; George McFarland; Butch; Buddy; Cora Sue Collins; Robert Coogan
- Cinematography: John Alton
- Edited by: Wallace Grissel
- Production company: Republic Pictures
- Release date: December 31, 1942
- Running time: 63 minutes
- Country: United States
- Language: English

Johnny Doughboy is a 1942 American black-and-white musical comedy film directed by John H. Auer for Republic Pictures. It stars Jane Withers in a dual role as a 16-year-old actress who is sick of playing juvenile roles, and her lookalike fan who is persuaded by a group of "has-been" child stars to perform with them in a U.S. troop show. The film features cameos by ex-child stars Bobby Breen, Carl "Alfalfa" Switzer, George "Spanky" McFarland, Baby Sandy, and others. It received an Academy Award nomination for Best Musical Score.

== Plot ==
Sixteen-year-old film star Ann Winters is sick of playing juvenile roles and decides to run away for a vacation, to the consternation of her manager, Harry Fabian, who has just arranged for her to play a 12-year-old in Ann of Honeysuckle Farm. As soon as Ann drives off, Penelope Ryan, president of the Ann Winters fan club back in Oriole, Nebraska, arrives for a two-week stay as the winner of a lookalike contest that Harry dreamed up. Though she looks just like Ann, Penelope is sweet and agreeable, unlike Ann's brash and impetuous personality. Meanwhile, Ann runs out of gas in the middle of the mountains at night and seeks help at a private home. The housekeeper, Mammy, lets her in and gives her a bed for the night. Later that night, Ann is awakened by the entrance of the owner of the house, Oliver Lawrence, a playwright. Oliver goes along with Ann's desire not to reveal her true identity, and in the morning Mammy arranges for them to spend Ann's vacation together, hiking, boating, and dancing. Though she is only 16 and Oliver is old enough to be her father, Ann develops a crush on him.

Back at Ann's home, Penelope is accosted by members of the "20 Minus Club", a group of ex-child stars who want to put on a show to entertain the troops before they go off to war. The club members explain to Penelope that the only way they can get funding is if they have a name star on their bill. Believing she is Ann, they convince her to say yes. They perform their song and dance act for Penelope, but when she is asked to sing in a duet with Johnny, Ann's former sweetheart, Penelope realizes that she can't do the show and reneges on her promise. She feels awful about it, and as she packs to go back to Nebraska, she confides in Ann's secretary, "Biggy" Biggsworth, what she's done. Biggy hints to her where Ann is vacationing and Penelope gets the "20 Minus Club" to drive her there to see Ann.

When Ann sees Penelope for the first time, she is taken aback by their resemblance. Then she confides in Penelope that she has given up film for the theater, and has also taken up with Oliver on a personal level. Oliver hears their conversation from the next room and confronts Ann, convincing her there is nothing between them by having his daughter Jennifer pose as his girlfriend. Ann runs outside in tears and Johnny, who has been waiting all this time for Penelope to return, finds her. Ann realizes she still is fond of Johnny though the studio broke up their friendship, and she agrees to perform in the show. The final act is the show itself, with Ann and Johnny singing and dancing in the lead.

== Cast ==
- Jane Withers as Ann Winters and Penelope Ryan
- Henry Wilcoxon as Oliver Lawrence
- Patrick Brook as Johnny Kelly
- William Demarest as Harry Fabian
- Ruth Donnelly as "Biggy" Biggsworth
- Etta McDaniel as Mammy
- Joline Westbrook as Jennifer Lawrence
- Bobby Breen as himself
- Baby Sandy as herself
- Carl "Alfalfa" Switzer as himself
- George "Spanky" McFarland as himself
- Butch (Kenneth Brown) as himself
- Buddy (Billy Lenhart) as himself
- Cora Sue Collins as herself
- Robert Coogan as himself
- Grace Costello as herself
- Karl Kiffe as himself
- The Falkner Orchestra as Themselves

== Production ==
=== Development ===
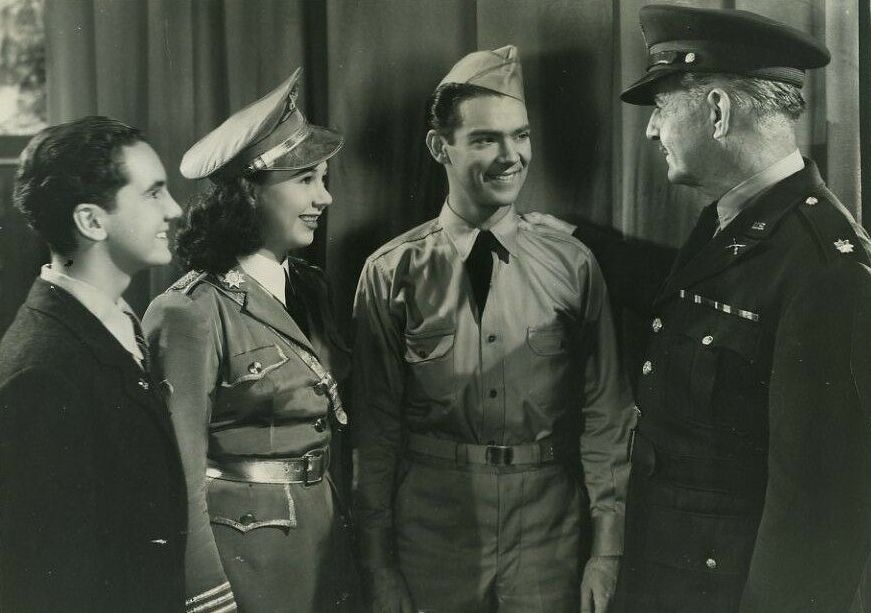
Publicity photo featuring (l. to r.) Bobby Breen, Jane Withers, and Patrick Brook

Johnny Doughboy is based on an original story by Frederick Kohner; Lawrence Kimble adapted the screenplay.

=== Casting ===
This was Jane Withers' first film after completing her seven-year contract with 20th Century Fox. It was also Withers's third screen pairing with Etta McDaniel, sister of actress Hattie McDaniel and a former vaudevillian. According to The Hollywood Reporter, actor Henry Wilcoxon announced he would donate his fee for the film to the United States Coast Guard Relief.

The fictional "20 Minus Club" is depicted as an organization for once famous child stars. The "members" (all of whom portray themselves) really were Hollywood "has-beens", and this was the last time some of them appeared on screen. Members of the club include actor/singer Bobby Breen, Baby Sandy, former Our Gang stars Carl "Alfalfa" Switzer and George "Spanky" McFarland (reunited on film for the final time), musicians "Butch" and "Buddy" (Kenneth Brown and Billy Lenhart), actress Cora Sue Collins, actor Robert Coogan, dancer Grace Costello, drummer Karl Kiffe, and the Faulkner Orchestra.

=== Music ===
Breen performs "Ave Maria" by Franz Schubert in one musical segment. Songs performed in the film's grand finale "victory chorus" include:

- "It Takes a Guy Like I", "You Do My Eyes a Favor", "Baby's a Big Girl Now", "All Done, All Through", "Give the Kids a Chance", "The Victory Caravan" — music and lyrics by Jule Styne and Sammy Cahn
- "Better Not Roll Those Blue, Blue Eyes" — music and lyrics by Al Goodhart and Kay Twomey
- "Johnny Doughboy Found a Rose in Ireland" — music by Al Goodhart and Allan Roberts, lyrics by Kay Twomey

"Johnny Doughboy Found a Rose in Ireland" was one of the top 10 best-selling songs, and songs with the most radio plays, in the United States in 1942 according to Billboard.

=== Filming ===
Filming took place from mid-August to September 11, 1942. Filmmakers had originally planned to use the exterior of Withers's own home as the home of the child star in the first scene, but decided it didn't look the part. The home of an electrician working on the set was filmed instead.

== Release ==
The film was released on December 31, 1942.

== Critical reception ==
Reviews in The New York Times and The Boston Globe observed that the film did not have much of a plot beyond Jane Withers playing a dual role, but the film was entertaining nevertheless. The New York Times review complimented the scriptwriters for cleverly helping the now-teenaged Withers transition from child stardom to adult roles by having her "be both her old and new self" in the film. "It gets a little confusing at times to be seeing two Jane Witherses, but at least it makes for contrast", this review concluded. The Boston Globe called Withers "a slim, personable young lady" who "sings, dances and even carries on a long conversation with herself". This review also praised Patrick Brook's acting and singing, and called Ruth Donnelly's performance "amusing".

The Brooklyn Citizen noted the tie-in between Withers's real-life participation in war bond drives and her fictional musical performance at a soldiers' camp in this film. During World War II, Withers participated in more than 100 U.S. war bond drives and camp tours.

In a 2019 review, James L. Neibaur calls the film "breezy" and "a pleasant diversion", adding that it is "a good example of the type of second-feature that was popular on double feature programs during the war years".

=== Accolades ===
Walter Scharf was nominated for Best Musical Score at the 15th Academy Awards, but lost to Ray Heindorf and Heinz Roemheld for their score for Yankee Doodle Dandy.
