= East Side of Heaven =

- Theatrical release poster
- Directed by: David Butler
- Screenplay by: William M. Conselman
- Story by: David Butler; Herbert Polesie
- Produced by: David Butler; Herbert Polesie
- Starring: Bing Crosby; Joan Blondell; Mischa Auer; Irene Hervey; C. Aubrey Smith; Robert Kent; Jerome Cowan
- Cinematography: George Robinson
- Edited by: Irene Morra
- Music by: Charles Previn
- Production company: Universal Pictures
- Distributed by: Universal Pictures
- Release date: April 7, 1939
- Running time: 88 minutes
- Country: United States
- Language: English

East Side of Heaven is a 1939 American musical film directed by David Butler and written by William M. Conselman. The film stars Bing Crosby, Joan Blondell, Mischa Auer, Irene Hervey, C. Aubrey Smith, Robert Kent and Jerome Cowan. Filming took place in Hollywood from January 13 to March 7, 1939. The film was released on April 7, 1939, by Universal Pictures and had its New York premiere at Radio City Music Hall on May 4, 1939. This was another independent production in which Crosby had a financial interest.

== Cast ==
- Bing Crosby as Denny Martin
- Joan Blondell as Mary Wilson
- Mischa Auer as Nicky
- Irene Hervey as Mona Barrett
- C. Aubrey Smith as Cyrus Barrett Snr.
- Robert Kent as Cyrus Barrett Jr.
- Jerome Cowan as Claudius De Wolfe
- Baby Sandy as Sandy, the Barrett Baby
- Jane Jones as Mrs. Kelly, One of the Singing Cooks
- Rose Valyda as Singing Cook
- Helen Warner as Singing Cook
- Jack Powell as Happy Jack, the Chef
- Matty Malneck as Orchestra Leader
- Emory Parnell as Doorman

== Reception ==
Variety's reviewer was enthusiastic about the film, calling it "a grand package of entertainment that will play a merry tune at the b. o... Despite his financial interests, Crosby gives support plenty of work and opportunity for some fat lines and situations. Result is a nicely molded piece of light entertainment, long on the comedy and human interest sides, with Crosby the dominant factor throughout. . . Picture is smartly paced, hitting a nice tempo at the start and rolling merrily to the finish. . . Four tunes by Monaco and Burke are handled competently by Crosby, all good, and all with a chance for pop attention.

Frank Nugent, writing in The New York Times, was equally positive: "If there is anything in motion pictures more subtly calculated to paralyze the critical facility than Bing Crosby, it is the formula which Universal has happily hit upon in East Side of Heaven, at the Music Hall: Bing Crosby and a baby. Whatever the cause—and it is never too wise to inquire too nicely into the origins of the comic spirit—the result in this case is the most felicitous occurrence involving Crosby since last year’s Sing You Sinners Even for persons who hate crooning, the spectacle of Mr. Crosby dutifully chanting holiday greetings over the telephone for Postal Union Telegraph...should afford a certain sadistic pleasure...And those rare, dyspeptical types who hate both crooners and babies will derive an evil joy from the scenes in which Bing forced to hide the child after it is kidnapped from grandpa by mama, walks the floor in his pajamas crooning to the helpless infant."

== Soundtrack ==
- "Sing a Song of Sunbeams"
- "Hang Your Heart on a Hickory Limb"
- "That Sly Old Gentleman"
- "East Side of Heaven"
  All written by James V. Monaco and Johnny Burke and sung by Bing Crosby
- "Happy Birthday" sung by Bing Crosby
- "Fifty Years Ago Today" sung by Bing Crosby
- "Now That You Are Man and Wife" sung by Bing Crosby

Bing Crosby recorded four of the songs for Decca Records. "Sing a Song of Sunbeams", "East Side of Heaven" and "That Sly Old Gentleman" all achieved top ten positions in the charts. Crosby's songs were also included in the Bing's Hollywood series.
