= The Payoff (1942 film) =

1942 film by Arthur Dreifuss

- Directed by: Arthur Dreifuss
- Screenplay by: Edward Dein
- Story by: Arthur Hoerl
- Produced by: Jack Schwarz; Lee Tracy (uncredited); Harry D. Edwards (associate producer)
- Starring: See below
- Cinematography: Ira H. Morgan
- Edited by: Charles Henkel Jr.
- Music by: Charles Dant
- Distributed by: Producers Releasing Corporation
- Release date: 24 November 1942
- Running time: 74 minutes
- Country: United States
- Language: English

The Payoff is a 1942 American film directed by Arthur Dreifuss and co-produced by actor Lee Tracy and independent producer Jack Schwarz. It was released by Producers Releasing Corporation (PRC), a low-budget film studio.

== Plot summary ==
A special prosecutor goes after a syndicate involved in rackets and local corruption. He is murdered before he can bring his case to trial. Police reporter Brad McKay investigates, and uncovers a $100,000 bribe. McKay traces the money to a nightclub operator, who orders his assistant to kill the reporter. When the assistant is himself found dead, McKay has two murders to solve.

== Cast ==
- Lee Tracy as Brad McKay - Police Investigative Reporter
- Tom Brown as Guy Norris - Publisher's son
- Tina Thayer as Phyllis Walker - Hugh's Daughter
- Evelyn Brent as Alma Doren - McKay's Love Interest
- Jack La Rue as John Angus - Casino Owner
- Ian Keith as Police Inspector Thomas
- Robert Middlemass as Norris – Newspaper Publisher
- John Maxwell as Moroni - Racketeer
- John Sheehan as Police Sergeant Brennan
- Harry C. Bradley as Dr. Steele - Coroner
- Forrest Taylor as Hugh Walker - Angus Assistant
- Pat Costello as Reporter Pat

== Production ==
In 1942 Lee Tracy announced plans to partner with Jack Schwarz and co-produce a series of feature films for PRC release, only to forsake the deal when he was accepted by the U. S. Army for military service. Just before he reported for duty as a first lieutenant in the Army Military Police Corps, Tracy did manage to make one quickie feature with Schwarz, The Payoff.

== Reception ==
Both Tracy and the picture were well received by trade critics. Motion Picture Herald called The Payoff "by far the best picture to come from Producers Releasing Corp. Lee Tracy, with all the fire of The Front Page, returns to the screen before reporting to the Army, and does exceptionally well with the part of the reporter." Trade publisher Pete Harrison wrote, "This newspaperman-gangster melodrama is as good, and better, than many similar type program pictures produced by the major studios. Tracy performs very well, and his antics should more than satisfy the action trade." Showmen's Trade Review said, "Here is one that is strong enough to stand on its own [as a single feature] and should prove a satisfactory business-getter. For his return to pictures, Lee Tracy has picked a good story, a good cast, and a good director."
