= Nan Grey =

American actress (1918–1993)

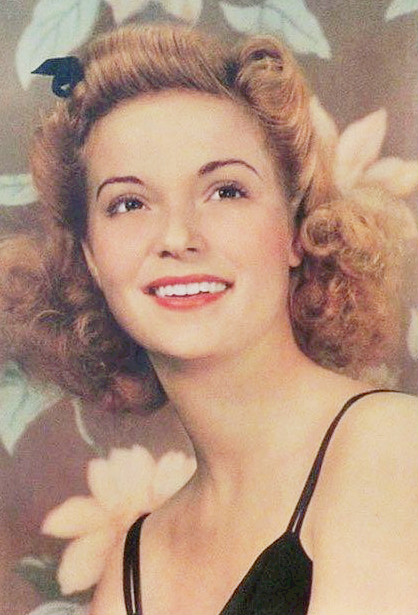
- Grey in 1942
- Born: Eschol Loleete Miller; July 25, 1921; Houston, Texas, U.S.
- Died: July 25, 1993 (aged 72); San Diego, California, U.S.
- Education: Travis Elementary School; Hallie R. Pritchard School of Dancing; Reagan High School; Universal City Studio School
- Occupation: Actress
- Years active: 1934–1941
- Known for: Three Smart Girls; Three Smart Girls Grow Up
- Spouses: Jack Westrope (m. 1939; div. 1950) Frankie Laine (m. 1950)
- Children: 2 daughters

Nan Grey (born Eschol Loleete Miller; July 25, 1921 – July 25, 1993) was an American film actress.

== Early years ==
Born in Houston, Texas, on July 25, 1921, Grey was the daughter of stage actress Violet Ross Miller and projectionist Edward J. Miller. Despite reportedly having early on been inspired to pursue acting by her mother's example (indeed, Grey's first documented public performance was given at age 3, with "little Eschol Miller" cast as Cupid at a neighbor's bridal shower), it appears that Grey spent the bulk of her pre-teens residing solely with father and paternal grandparents. As for her own career, Grey's first bona fide foray came, circa 1930, with her entry into the Hallie R. Pritchard School of Dancing, from which she graduated in June 1934. Shortly thereafter, Grey went to Hollywood with her mother for a holiday. She was persuaded by a friend to take a screen test and ended up in pictures.

Grey attended the school that Universal Studios operated for children who had film contracts.

== Career ==
=== Film ===
Grey's screen debut was in 1934 in Warner Bros.'s The Firebird. She starred opposite John Wayne in the 1936 film Sea Spoilers. Grey appeared in the Universal Monsters films Dracula's Daughter (1936) and The Invisible Man Returns (1940). She also appeared in the popular 1936 musical comedy Three Smart Girls, as well as the 1939 sequel Three Smart Girls Grow Up.

=== Radio ===
Grey played Kathy Marshall in the NBC radio soap opera Those We Love 1938-1945. Grey played in The Lux Radio Theatre, November 8, 1937 episode, "She Loves Me Not" with Bing Crosby, Joan Blondell, and Sterling Holloway

=== Television ===
Grey's final screen credit—as well as her first and only television appearance, co-starring with newly wed spouse No. 2, singer Frankie Laine—was on the 1960 episode of Rawhide, "Incident on the Road to Yesterday". Brought about by the huge popularity of Laine's rendition of the show's theme song, the episode stars the fledgling actor as a former bandit attempting to make amends for a robbery ten years after the fact, and, in the process, being reunited with "old flame", Grey.

=== Invention ===
In the 1960s, Grey invented and marketed a cosmetic mirror especially suited to nearsighted women. An obituary noted, "Among its users was Princess Grace of Monaco."

== Personal life ==
On May 4, 1939, Grey married U. S. Racing Hall of Fame jockey Jack Westrope in Phoenix, Arizona.

She married singer Frankie Laine in June 1950, and Laine adopted Grey's daughters (Pam and Jan) from her marriage to Westrope.

== Death ==
The Laines' 43-year union lasted until her death from heart failure on July 25, 1993, her 72nd birthday.

== Filmography ==
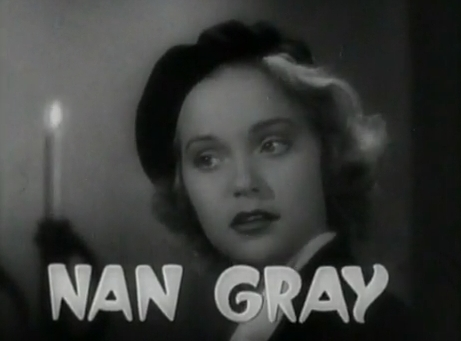
Grey in Dracula's Daughter (1936)

Year	Title	Role	Notes
1934	The St. Louis Kid	First Girl	(scenes deleted)
1934	The Firebird	Alice von Attem	
1934	Babbitt	Eunice Littlefield	
1935	The Woman in Red	Minor Role	Uncredited
1935	Mary Jane's Pa	Lucille Preston	
1935	The Affair of Susan	Miss Skelly	
1935	His Night Out	Minor Role	Uncredited
1935	The Great Impersonation	Middleton's Daughter	Uncredited
1936	Next Time We Love	Ingenue	Uncredited
1936	Sutter's Gold	Ann Eliza Sutter	
1936	Love Before Breakfast	Telephone Girl	Uncredited
1936	Dracula's Daughter	Lili	
1936	Nobody's Fool	Young Girl	Uncredited
1936	Crash Donovan	Doris Tennyson	
1936	Sea Spoilers	Connie Dawson	
1936	Three Smart Girls	Joan	
1937	Let Them Live	Judith Marshall	
1937	The Man in Blue	June Hanson	
1937	Love in a Bungalow	Mary Callahan	
1937	Some Blondes Are Dangerous	Judy Williams	
1938	The Jury's Secret	Mary Norris	
1938	The Black Doll	Marian Rood	
1938	Reckless Living	Laurie Andrews	
1938	Danger on the Air	Christina 'Steenie' MacCorkle	
1938	Girls' School	Linda Simpson	
1938	The Storm	Peggy Phillips	
1939	Three Smart Girls Grow Up	Joan Craig	
1939	Ex-Champ	Joan Grey	
1939	The Under-Pup	Priscilla Adams	
1939	Tower of London	Lady Alice Barton	
1940	The Invisible Man Returns	Helen Manson	
1940	The House of the Seven Gables	Phoebe Pyncheon	
1940	Sandy Is a Lady	Mary Phillips	
1940	You're Not So Tough	Millie	
1940	Margie	Margie	
1940	A Little Bit of Heaven	Janet Loring	
1941	Under Age	Jane Baird	
