= Menace (1934 American film) =

1934 film by Ralph Murphy

- Directed by: Ralph Murphy
- Written by: Chandler Sprague; Anthony Veiller
- Based on: Menace by Philip MacDonald
- Produced by: Bayard Veiller; Emanuel Cohen
- Starring: Gertrude Michael; Paul Cavanagh; Henrietta Crosman
- Cinematography: Ben F. Reynolds
- Edited by: Anne Bauchens
- Production company: Paramount Pictures
- Distributed by: Paramount Pictures
- Release date: 1934
- Running time: 58 minutes
- Country: United States
- Language: English

Menace is a 1934 American horror mystery film directed by Ralph Murphy and starring Gertrude Michael, Paul Cavanagh and Henrietta Crosman. The emerging star Ray Milland billed fifth. It was produced and distributed by Paramount Pictures. It is based on the 1933 novel Menace by British writer Philip MacDonald. Mitchell Leisen was originally intended to direct the film before being replaced by Murphy. A review in the New York Times considered "it ranks several notches higher than the average murder film".

== Plot ==
In Kenya in British East Africa socialites Helen Chalmers and Norman Bellamy as well as British Army colonel Leonard Crecy need a fourth for bridge. They persuade engineer Freddie Bastion to leave the dam he is supposed to be supervising to join them. On his plane journey back a thunderstorm destroys the damn, drowning Bastion's two sisters, and causing his plane to crash. In London Timothy Bastion, the dead man's brother, is driven mad with grief and sent to a lunatic asylum.

Escaping, Timothy sends threatening letters to the three people he considers responsible for the tragedy, promising to kill them. Two years after the disaster, the three are all gathered at a country estate in California owned by Helen. Timothy has managed to conceal himself either amongst the servants and guests to the house, seeking murderous revenge.

== Cast ==
- Gertrude Michael as Helen Chalmers
- Paul Cavanagh as Col. Leonard Crecy
- Henrietta Crosman as Sybil Thornton
- John Lodge as Ronald Cavendish
- Ray Milland as Freddie Bastion
- Berton Churchill as Norman Bellamy
- Halliwell Hobbes as Skinner
- Robert Allen as Andrew Forsythe
- Forrester Harvey as Wilcox
- Montagu Love as Police Inspector
- Arletta Duncan as Gloria Chalmers
- Gwenllian Gill as Alison Bastion
- Doris Llewelyn as Cynthia Bastion
- Desmond Roberts as Underwood
- Blue Washington as Kenyan Manservant
- Arthur Clayton as Police Officer

== Bibliography ==
- Goble, Alan. The Complete Index to Literary Sources in Film. Walter de Gruyter, 1999.
- McKay, James. Ray Milland: The Films, 1929-1984. McFarland, 2020.
