= Sandy Gets Her Man =

- Theatrical release poster
- Directed by: Otis Garrett; Paul Gerard Smith
- Screenplay by: Sy Bartlett; Jane Storm
- Produced by: Burt Kelly
- Starring: Baby Sandy; Stuart Erwin; Una Merkel; Edgar Kennedy; William Frawley; Edward Brophy; Wally Vernon; Jack Carson; William B. Davidson
- Cinematography: Elwood Bredell
- Edited by: Philip Cahn
- Production company: Universal Pictures
- Distributed by: Universal Pictures
- Release date: November 8, 1940
- Running time: 65 minutes
- Country: United States
- Language: English

Sandy Gets Her Man is a 1940 American comedy film directed by Otis Garrett and Paul Gerard Smith and written by Sy Bartlett and Jane Storm. The film stars Baby Sandy, Stuart Erwin, Una Merkel, Edgar Kennedy, William Frawley, Edward Brophy, Wally Vernon, Jack Carson and William B. Davidson. The film was released on November 8, 1940, by Universal Pictures.

== Cast ==
- Baby Sandy as Sandy
- Stuart Erwin as Bill Carey
- Una Merkel as Nan Clark
- Edgar Kennedy as Fire Chief Galvin
- William Frawley as Police Chief J. A. O'Hara
- Edward Brophy as Junior
- Wally Vernon as Bagshaw
- Jack Carson as Tom Gerrity
- William B. Davidson as Councilman Charles J. Clark
- John Sheehan as Justice of the Peace
- Isabel Randolph as Myrtle
- Lillian Yarbo as Hattie, the Maid (uncredited)
