= Melody Lane (1941 film) =

1941 film

- Theatrical release poster
- Directed by: Charles Lamont
- Screenplay by: Hugh Wedlock Jr. Howard Snyder; Morton Grant; George Rony
- Story by: Bernard Feins
- Produced by: Ken Goldsmith
- Starring: Leon Errol; Anne Gwynne; Robert Paige; Billy Lenhart; Kenneth Brown; Don Douglas
- Cinematography: Jerome Ash
- Edited by: Otto Ludwig
- Production company: Universal Pictures
- Distributed by: Universal Pictures
- Release date: December 9, 1941
- Running time: 60 minutes
- Country: United States
- Language: English

Melody Lane is a 1941 American comedy film directed by Charles Lamont and written by Hugh Wedlock Jr., Howard Snyder, Morton Grant and George Rony. The film stars Leon Errol, Anne Gwynne, Robert Paige, Billy Lenhart, Kenneth Brown and Don Douglas. The film was released on December 9, 1941, by Universal Pictures.

== Cast ==
- Leon Errol as McKenzie

*Anne Gwynne as Patricia Reynolds

- Robert Paige as Gabe Morgan
- Billy Lenhart as Butch
- Kenneth Brown as Buddy
- Don Douglas as J. Roy Thomas
- Baby Sandy as Sandy
- Louis DaPron as Louis
- Red Stanley as Slim
- Charles Coleman as Mr. Abercrombie
- Will Lee as Mr. Russo
- Tim Ryan as Police Sergeant
- Barbara Brown as Mrs. Stuart
- Bess Flowers as Mrs. Russo (uncredited)
- Judd McMichael as Rhythmeer Member Judd
- Ted McMichael as Rhythmeer Member Ted
- Joe McMichael as Rhythmeer Member Joe
- Mary Lou Cook as Rhythmeer Member Mary Lou
