= Dorothy Dell =

American model and actress (1915–1934)

- Born: Dorothy Goff; January 30, 1915; Hattiesburg, Mississippi, U.S.
- Died: June 8, 1934 (aged 19); Altadena, California, U.S.
- Occupation: Actress
- Years active: 1932–1934

Dorothy Dell (born Dorothy Goff; January 30, 1915 – June 8, 1934) was an American film actress. She died in an auto accident at the age of 19.

== Early life and career ==
Born in Hattiesburg, Mississippi to entertainers, Dorothy moved with her family to New Orleans, Louisiana, at age 13. She was born into a socially prominent family, and her mother was a descendant of Jefferson Davis. Initially desiring to become a singer, she was discovered by composer Wesley Lord, and soon signed a radio contract. She began entering and winning beauty pageants and at the age of 17 won the title of "Miss New Orleans" in 1930. That same year she attended the International Pageant of Pulchritude in Galveston, Texas, and won the title of Miss Universe (not to be confused with the later Miss Universe founded in 1952). With this success, she established a successful vaudeville act. Although she had received better offers, she decided to enter the vaudeville circuit, because she believed it would enable her to help her friend Dorothy Lamour rise to fame, a promise she had made shortly before winning the Miss Universe title at the Pageant.

After working on the vaudeville circuit for 32 weeks, she moved to New York City in 1931. One night, she sang at a benefit and was discovered by Florenz Ziegfeld, who arranged for her to appear on Broadway in the Ziegfeld Follies, and she followed this success with her role in the production of Tattle Tales in 1933. During this time she was closely associated with Russ Colombo, and her celebrity status was elevated by the media attention she received while denying rumors of an impending marriage. Dell and Columbo had met at her Ziegfeld audition; Columbo's manager, Con Conrad, was determined to end their relationship and did so with a series of "publicity only" romances between Columbo and other, more famous actresses.

She moved to Hollywood in December 1933 and was signed to a contract by Paramount Pictures. Initially being contracted for bit parts, she won her first film role over such established contenders as Mae Clarke and Isabel Jewell and made her debut in Wharf Angel (1934). The film was a success and the reviews for Dell were favorable; Paramount began to consider her as a potential star. Her most important and substantial role followed in the Shirley Temple film Little Miss Marker.

== Death ==
On Friday, June 8, 1934, Dell agreed to a car ride to Pasadena with 38-year-old Dr. Carl Wagner, because he insisted that she take some time for relaxation between retakes of Shoot the Works, and to meet his mother, whom he wanted to show "how sweet a little movie star can be." After the meeting, they went to an all-night party at an inn in Altadena, California. Afterward they were going to Pasadena when the car left the highway, hit a telephone pole, bounced off a palm tree and hit a boulder. Dell was killed instantly. Wagner, who was driving between 50 and 70 miles an hour, died six hours later in a hospital.

It has been claimed that she was engaged to Wagner, but this was dismissed by different sources, who believed that she was to be married to caricaturist Nat Carson, whom she met while performing as a chorus girl in Earl Carroll's Vanities. A week before her death, Carson left for work in London and proposed over the telephone. Dell planned on taking off six months for an extended honeymoon vacation. When Carson found out about her death, he decided not to return to Broadway, and he remained in London.

According to news reports, a day before her death, Dell mused: "You know, they say deaths go in cycles of three. First it was Lilyan Tashman, then Lew Cody. I wonder who'll be next?" She was interred in Metairie Cemetery, in New Orleans, Louisiana.

During her life, Dell had claimed several encounters with near-death experiences. As a child, she narrowly escaped death when being attacked by a dog. The dog was killed by her father to save Dell's life. In 1931, while at the Follies, she was invited to board a yacht for a party of Harry Richman. She declined, and the girl who took her place died in an explosion on board. A few weeks later she was critically injured following a car accident and hospitalized for two months. Furthermore, she fell ill with influenza shortly afterwards and broke a leg during a Follies performance.

== Legacy ==
Dell's role in Now and Forever was recast with Carole Lombard, and provided Lombard with one of her earliest significant successes. The news of Dell's death was kept from her dear friend Temple until filming started on the scene in which Temple's character discovers that her father had lied to her about stealing the necklace. When Temple threw herself on the bed and cried bitter tears, the tears were genuine, being connected to her friend's death.

Dorothy Lamour won the title of "Miss New Orleans" in 1931, succeeding her friend Dell who had won the title the previous year.

== Filmography ==
Year	Title	Role	Notes
1932	Passing the Buck		Short
1934	Wharf Angel	Toy	
1934	Little Miss Marker	Bangles Carson	
1934	Shoot the Works	Lily Raquel	(final film role)
