= Buck Privates Come Home =

1947 film by Charles Barton

- Theatrical release poster
- Directed by: Charles Barton
- Screenplay by: John Grant; Frederic I. Rinaldo; Robert Lees
- Story by: Richard Macaulay; Bradford Ropes
- Produced by: Robert Arthur
- Starring: Bud Abbott; Lou Costello; Tom Brown; Nat Pendleton; Beverly Simmons
- Cinematography: Charles Van Enger
- Edited by: Edward Curtiss
- Music by: Walter Schumann
- Distributed by: Universal-International Pictures
- Release date: April 4, 1947
- Running time: 77 minutes
- Country: United States
- Language: English
- Budget: $1,167,500
- Box office: $2,365,000 or $2 million (US rentals)

Buck Privates Come Home is a 1947 American comedy film directed by Charles Barton and starring the team of Abbott and Costello. It was released by Universal-International and is a sequel to their earlier film Buck Privates (1941).

This film marks the final role of veteran actor Nat Pendleton and the film debut of Russ Conway (in the role of an unnamed medic).

== Plot ==
After serving in Europe during World War II, Herbie Brown and Slicker Smith return to the United States aboard a troop ship. Also on board is their old nemesis, Sgt. Collins. As the ship nears New York, Collins and his superiors search the men's belongings for contraband. Herbie accidentally activates a time bomb, made to look like a camera, that he picked up as a souvenir and has to throw it out the porthole.

A six-year-old French orphan, Evey, whom Herbie and Slicker befriended, is found in Herbie's duffle bag. She is handed over to Lt. Sylvia Hunter, who delivers her to immigration officials in New York. However, during a shift change at the office, Evey is mistaken for a neighborhood kid and set free. Meanwhile, Herbie and Slicker are back to their pre-war occupation of peddling ties in Times Square. Collins is also back at his old job—a police officer assigned to the same beat. He is about to arrest the boys when Evey shows up and helps them escape.

Herbie and Slicker attempt to adopt Evey, but are told that one of them must be married and have a steady income. Evey suggests that Herbie marry Sylvia. They show up at her apartment, but learn that Sylvia already has a boyfriend, Bill Gregory.

At one point, Herbie and Slicker purchase what seems to be an ideal home for $750, but the seller doesn't want to let them see the interior prior to purchase. Before Herbie can get the front door open, the seller gives a signal and a truck hauls off the façade, revealing that the boys had just purchased a broken-down old bus. The two have to fix it up to use as a home.

Bill is a midget car racer. He is sure he will win the $20,000 prize at the Gold Cup Stakes, but his car is being held at a local garage until past-due bills are paid. Herbie and Slicker use their separation pay and loans from their old service pals to get the car out of hock. Collins, however, has other plans. He had been demoted repeatedly to ever less desirable beats thanks to the boys' escaping from him. He stakes out the garage in hopes of catching them and returning Evey to the immigration authorities to get himself back in good favor with his boss. He eventually chases them to the track, where Herbie gets in Bill's race car and leads everyone on a wild chase through the streets of New York.

Herbie is eventually caught, but not before the head of an automobile company is impressed enough to order 20 of Bill's cars and 200 engines. With his financial future secure, Bill can now marry Sylvia and adopt Evey. Slicker and Herbie will be allowed to visit Evey if they get jobs. Collins' captain suggests that they join the police force, which they do—with Collins as their instructor!

== Cast ==
- Bud Abbott as "Slicker" Smith
- Lou Costello as Herbie Brown
- Tom Brown as Bill Gregory
- Joan Shawlee as Sylvia Hunter (billed as Joan Fulton)
- Nat Pendleton as Sergeant Collins
- Beverly Simmons as Evey LeBrec
- Don Porter as Captain Christie
- Donald MacBride as Police Captain
- Don Beddoe as Mr. Roberts
- Charles Trowbridge as Mr. Quince
- Russell Hicks as Mr. Appleby
- Joe Kirk as Real Estate Salesman
- Knox Manning as Commentator
- Milburn Stone as Announcer
- Russ Conway as Medic (uncredited)

== Production ==
It was filmed from November 18, 1946, through January 23, 1947. It was originally budgeted at $1,167,500 but came in $34,500 over budget, making it the most expensive Abbott and Costello vehicle produced at Universal. The leads were paid $196,133.

Arthur T. Horman, the writer for the original movie, Buck Privates, wrote the first treatment for this sequel, titled The Return of the Buck Privates, but it was not used.

There is a joke used in the film that is often attributed to Benjamin Franklin. Herbie says, "I'd rather marry a homely girl than a pretty girl anyway," to which Slicker replies, "Why?" Herbie responds, "Well, if you marry a pretty girl, she is liable to run away." Evey chimes in with, "But Uncle Herbie, isn't a homely girl liable to run away, too?" Herbie's response is simple, "Yeah, but who cares?" This gag is also used in their film Pardon My Sarong.

When Costello drives the midget car through the rear of a movie theater, there is a poster that shows a fictional film, Abbott and Costello in 'Romeo Junior' on the wall. Scenes of Abbott and Costello in 'Romeo and Juliet' outfits, with Betty Alexander as Juliet, were filmed and were intended to be playing on the screen of the theater, but the scene was deleted.

== Routines ==
- The Sawhorse Table takes place on the ship. Costello creates a table by putting a board on a sawhorse. Every time one of them puts something down on one end of the table, the other one puts something on the other end to balance it. Neither one of them are aware of what is happening, until the table finally loses its balance and a cake flies off the table into Pendleton's face.

== Home media ==
This film has been released three times on DVD. Originally released as a single DVD on April 8, 1998, it was released twice as part of two different Abbott and Costello collections. The first time, on The Best of Abbott and Costello Volume Two, on May 4, 2004, and again on October 28, 2008, as part of Abbott and Costello: The Complete Universal Pictures Collection.
