= Bachelor Daddy =

1941 film by Harold Young

- Theatrical release poster
- Directed by: Harold Young
- Screenplay by: Robert Lees; Frederic I. Rinaldo
- Produced by: Burt Kelly
- Starring: Baby Sandy; Edward Everett Horton; Donald Woods; Raymond Walburn; Evelyn Ankers; Kathryn Adams Doty; Franklin Pangborn; Jed Prouty
- Cinematography: Milton Krasner
- Edited by: Paul Landres
- Production company: Universal Pictures
- Distributed by: Universal Pictures
- Release date: June 4, 1941
- Running time: 61 minutes
- Country: United States
- Language: English

Bachelor Daddy is a 1941 American comedy film directed by Harold Young and written by Robert Lees and Frederic I. Rinaldo. The film stars Baby Sandy, Edward Everett Horton, Donald Woods, Raymond Walburn, Evelyn Ankers, Kathryn Adams Doty, Franklin Pangborn and Jed Prouty. The film was released on June 4, 1941, by Universal Pictures.

== Plot ==
When Eleanor Pierce is arrested for selling homemade candy without a license, she sends a letter to "Mr. Smith" at the Bachelor's Club asking him to take care of "their" daughter. The Smith brothers, Joseph and George, accuse their brother Edward of being the father of the child, but they all show up at Eleanor's apartment to take charge of Sandy. Eleanor is released on her own recognizance and returns to claim her daughter, but when she sees the good care Sandy is receiving from her new "uncles" she decides Sandy might be better off with them. The brothers hire Eleanor as Sandy's nursemaid, and Edward Smith immediately falls for Eleanor, who eventually reveals that she is Sandy's mother. Edward and Eleanor sneak off, taking Sandy with them.

== Cast ==
- Baby Sandy as Sandy
- Edward Everett Horton as Joseph Smith
- Donald Woods as Edward Smith
- Raymond Walburn as George Smith
- Evelyn Ankers as Beth Chase
- Kathryn Adams Doty as Eleanor Pierce
- Franklin Pangborn as Williams
- Jed Prouty as C. J. Chase
- Hardie Albright as Ethelbert
- George Meader as Judge McGinnis
- Bert Roach as Louie
- Leonard Elliott as Clark
- Juanita Quigley as Girl
- Bobby Larson as Boy
- Mira McKinney as Landlady
