= Big Town Czar =

1939 film by Arthur Lubin

- Directed by: Arthur Lubin
- Written by: Edmund Hartmann
- Starring: Barton MacLane; Tom Brown
- Narrated by: Ed Sullivan
- Cinematography: Elwood Bredell
- Music by: Charles Previn
- Production company: Universal Pictures
- Distributed by: Universal Pictures
- Release dates: May 3, 1939 (New York City); May 11, 1939 (United States)
- Running time: 66 minutes
- Country: United States
- Language: English

Big Town Czar is a 1939 American mystery film directed by Arthur Lubin starring Barton MacLane and Tom Brown.

== Plot ==
New York City newspaper columnist Ed Sullivan relates the story of crime boss Phil Daley's rise and fall. To the disappointment of his parents but delight of younger brother Danny, crime has paid off handsomely for Phil, but he isn't able to discourage Danny from following in his footsteps.

Danny bribes a prizefighter to take a dive, costing rival gangster Mike Luger a lot of money in bets. Danny ends up dead, and Phil needs to lie low because Luger's looking for him, too. He manages to kill Luger, but ends up arrested, convicted and sentenced to die.

== Cast ==
- Barton MacLane as Phil Daley
- Tom Brown as Danny Daley
- Eve Arden as Susan Warren
- Jack La Rue as Mike Luger
- Horace McMahon as Punchy
- Frank Jenks as Sid Travis
- Ed Sullivan as himself

== Production ==
The film was based on a story by Ed Sullivan. Universal bought it in August 1938. Barton MacLane was cast in December.

Lubin was attached to the film in February 1939.

Filming started 24 February 1939.

== Reception ==
The New York Times called it "a bustling little melodrama."
