= Tom Brown (actor) =

American actor (1915–1990)

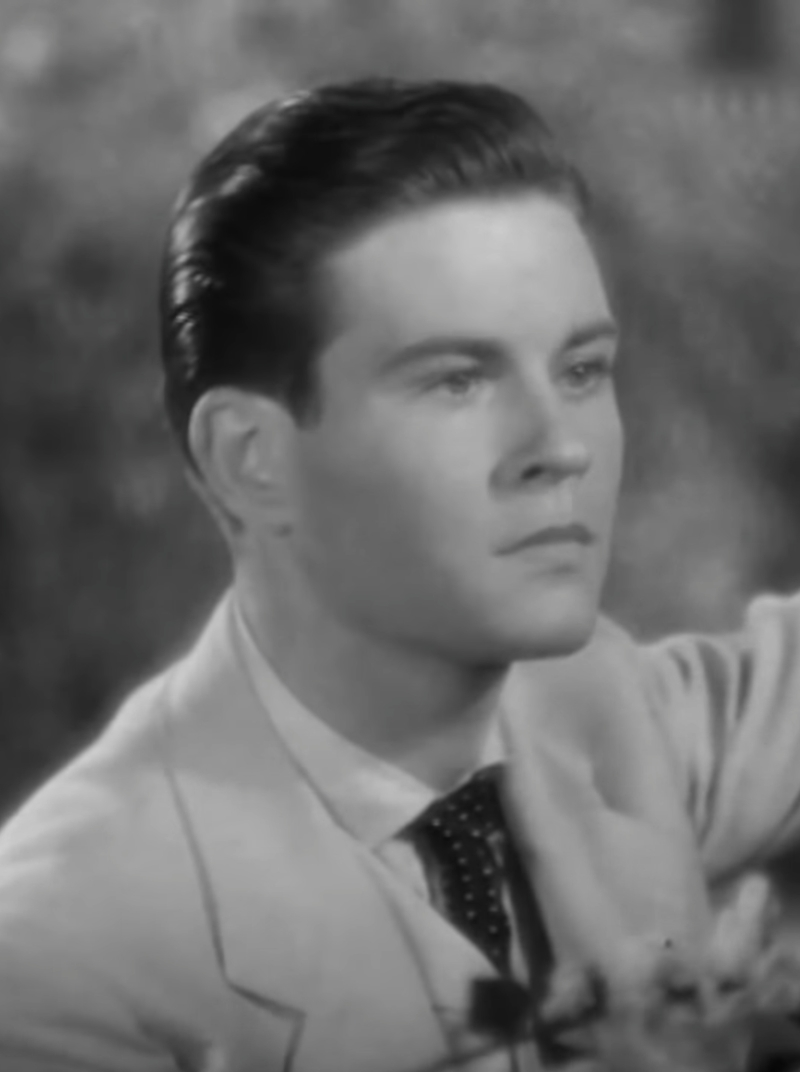
- Brown in Judge Priest (1934)
- Born: Thomas Edward Brown; January 6, 1915; New York City, U.S.
- Died: June 3, 1990 (aged 75); Woodland Hills, Los Angeles, California, U.S.
- Occupation: Actor
- Years active: 1924–1979
- Spouses: Natalie Draper (m. 1937; div. 1939) Barbara Grace Gormley (m. 1946; div. 1953)
- Children: 3

Tom Brown (né Thomas Edward Brown; January 6, 1915 – June 3, 1990) was an American actor and model.

== Biography ==
Brown was born in New York City, the son of William Harold "Harry" Brown and Marie Frances (Dunn) Brown. As a child model from the age of two years, Brown posed as Buster Brown, the Arrow Collar Boy and the Buick boy. He was educated at the New York Professional Children's School. He was carried on stage in his mother's arms when he was only six months old.

As an actor, he is probably best remembered for playing the title role in The Adventures of Smilin' Jack and as Gilbert Blythe in Anne of Green Gables (1934). Later, he appeared on the television shows Gunsmoke, Mr. Adams and Eve, General Hospital and Days of Our Lives. He had a recurring role as Lt. Rovacs in Mr. Lucky.

He enlisted in the United States Army in World War II where in three years he rose from private to lieutenant serving in France as a paratrooper where he was awarded a French Croix de Guerre and a Bronze Star Medal. He was promoted to captain with the 40th Infantry Division. He served during the Korean War with the 40th Infantry Division where he reached the rank of lieutenant colonel.

== Death and legacy ==
Brown died in Woodland Hills, Los Angeles, aged 75.

For his contributions to the film industry, Brown was inducted into the Hollywood Walk of Fame in 1960, with a motion pictures star located at 1648 Vine Street.

== Filmography ==
- The Hoosier Schoolmaster (1924) as Shocky Thompson (film debut)
- The Wrongdoers (1925) as Little Jimmy
- Syncopation (1929) as Bellhop (uncredited)
- The Lady Lies (1929) as Bob Rossiter
- Queen High (1930) as Jimmy
- The Famous Ferguson Case (1932) as Bruce Foster
- Fast Companions (1932) as Marty Black
- Tom Brown of Culver (1932) as Tom Brown
- Hell's Highway (1932) as Johnny Ellis
- Laughter in Hell (1933) as Barton
- Destination Unknown (1933) as Johnny
- Central Airport (1933) as Neil 'Bud' Blaine
- Three-Cornered Moon (1933) as Eddie Rimplegar
- Two Alone (1934) as Adam
- This Side of Heaven (1934) as Seth Turner
- The Witching Hour (1934) as Clay Thorne
- Judge Priest (1934) as Jerome Priest
- Anne of Green Gables (1934) as Gilbert Blythe
- Bachelor of Arts (1934) as Alec Hamilton
- Sweepstake Annie (1935) as Bill Enright
- Mary Jane's Pa (1935) as King Wagner
- Black Sheep (1935) as Fred Curtis
- Annapolis Farewell (1935) as Morton 'Click' Haley
- Freckles (1935) as Freckles
- Gentle Julia (1936) as Noble Dill
- And Sudden Death (1936) as Jackie Winslow
- I'd Give My Life (1936) as Nickie Elkins
- Rose Bowl (1936) as Paddy O'Riley
- Her Husband Lies (1937) as 'Chick' Thomas
- Maytime (1937) as Kip Stuart
- Jim Hanvey, Detective (1937) as Don Terry
- That Man's Here Again (1937) as Jimmy Whalen
- The Man Who Cried Wolf (1937) as Tommy Bradley
- Navy Blue and Gold (1937) as Richard Arnold 'Dick' Gates Jr.
- In Old Chicago (1938) as Bob O'Leary
- Merrily We Live (1938) as Kane Kilbourne
- Goodbye Broadway (1938) as Chuck Bradford
- Swing That Cheer (1938) as Bob Potter
- The Storm (1938) as Jim Roberts - Bob's Brother
- The Duke of West Point (1938) as Sonny Drew
- Sergeant Madden (1939) as Albert 'Al' Boylan, Jr.
- Big Town Czar (1939) - Danny Daley
- Ex-Champ (1939) as Bob Hill
- These Glamour Girls (1939) as Homer Ten Eyck
- Oh Johnny, How You Can Love (1940) - Johnny Sandham
- Ma! He's Making Eyes at Me (1940) as Tommy Shaw
- Sandy Is a Lady (1940) as Joe Phillips
- Margie (1940) as Bret
- Hello, Sucker (1941) as Bob Wade
- Three Sons o' Guns (1941) as Eddie Patterson
- Niagara Falls (1941) as Tom Wilson
- Sleepytime Gal (1942) as Chick Patterson
- Hello, Annapolis (1942) as Bill Arden
- Let's Get Tough! (1942) as Phil
- There's One Born Every Minute (1942) as Jimmy Hanagan
- Youth on Parade (1942) as Bingo Brown
- The Payoff (1942) as Guy Norris
- The Adventures of Smilin' Jack (1943, Serial) as Jack Martin
- Buck Privates Come Home (1947) as Bill Gregory
- Slippy McGee (1948) as Father Shanley
- Duke of Chicago (1949) as Jimmy Brody
- Ringside (1949) as Joe O'Hara
- Operation Haylift (1950) as Tom Masters
- I Killed Wild Bill Hickok (1956) as Wild Bill Hickok
- Naked Gun (1956) as Sonny Glenn
- The Quiet Gun (1957) as John Reilly
- The Notorious Mr. Monks (1958) as Payson, Defense Attorney
- The Choppers (1961) as Tom Hart
- Cutter's Trail (1970, TV) as Orville Mason (final film)

=== Television ===
- The Life and Legend of Wyatt Earp (1956-1958) as Bill Slocum/Frank Burroughs
- Mr. Adams and Eve (1957) as Harry (Episode: "You Can't Go Home Again")
- Circus Boy (1957) as Ned Bailey
- The Lone Ranger (1957) as De Witt Faversham
- The Adventures of Jim Bowie (1958) as Jeff Purky
- Have Gun - Will Travel (1958) as Bob Pelley
- Sugarfoot (1959) as Sheriff Pete Rayle
- Perry Mason (1959) as Assistant District Attorney Jarvis
- Colt .45 (1959) as Sheriff Frank Willis
- Mr. Lucky (1959-1960) as Lieutenant Rovacs
- Gunsmoke (1959-1974) as Major/Ed O'Connor
- Lassie (1960) as Joe Morgan
- 77 Sunset Strip (1961) as Lou Maxton
- The Rifleman (1962) as Sheriff
- The Untouchables (1962) as Police Captain Bellows
- General Hospital (1965) as Al Weeks #2
- Mister Roberts (1966) as Admiral Morrison
- Cimarron Strip (1967-1968) as Sheriff Phillips/Charlie Ives
- The High Chaparral (1970) as Spokes
- The Jeffersons (1975-1979) as Radio Announcer/Emcee
- Ellery Queen (1976) as Marvin - The Broadcaster
- Days of Our Lives (1976) as Nathan Curtis
