= Emanuel Cohen =

American film producer (1892–1977)

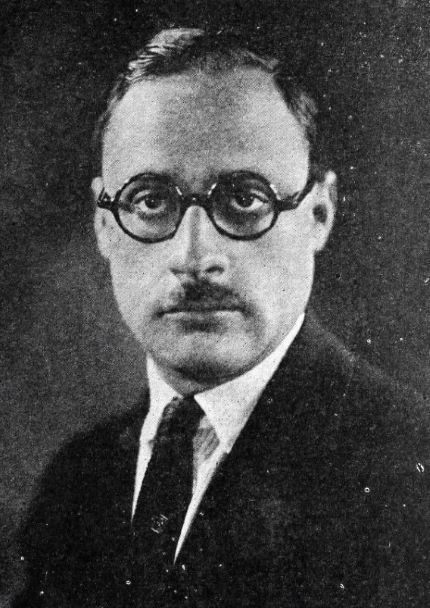
Cohen in 1925 while an editor for Pathé News

Emanuel Cohen (1892 - 1977) was an American film producer. He was vice president in charge of production at Paramount Pictures from 1932 to 1935. From 1935 he had his own production company, Major Films, making films starring Mae West and Bing Crosby among others.

== Select filmography ==
- Menace (1934)
- Pennies from Heaven (1936)
- On Such a Night (1937)
- The Girl from Scotland Yard (1937)
- Every Day's a Holiday (1938)
