= Jill Dennett =

American actress

Jill Dennett (May 26, 1913 – March 14, 1969) was a motion picture actress in Hollywood movies for a decade, beginning in 1932. She appeared in more than twenty films, all of the appearances in uncredited roles. She was a talented dancer and singer. Born in New York and died in Los Angeles, California at the age of 56. under the name of Edythe Jill Barnes.

== Career ==
=== Early years ===
Dennett was the daughter of comedy star Dave Kramer of the Kramer & Boyle act. She acted professionally at age 5 when she portrayed an Italian boy in a production of Magic Melody. She studied at New York's professional children's school.

=== Stage to screen ===
Dennett began performing in vaudeville at age 14 and established herself as a favorite there before entering films. In 1931 her eyes were insured by Lloyd's of London for $100,000. After a small part in Union Station (1932), Dennett appeared with her father on stage at the Hillstreet Theater in Los Angeles. In 1934, Dennett performed in Edinburgh, Scotland.

=== Minor film actress ===
After playing Daisy, the girl of the pavements in Union Depot, she was given a contract for two additional films by Warner Bros. She next depicted an ingénue in The Tinsel Girl (1932), a film directed by Michael Curtiz. This was followed by her portrayal of Tart in Two Seconds (1932). This screen crime drama starred Edward G. Robinson and was directed by Mervyn LeRoy.

From the mid-1930s Dennett acted small parts in The Merry Widow (1934), Men In White (1934), One More Spring (1935), The Devil Is A Woman (1935), Dramatic School (1938), Broadway Serenade (1939), Stardust (1940), Manhattan Heartbeat (1940), Street of Memories (1940), and The Cowboy and the Blonde (1941).

=== Variety show performer ===
In August 1934, Dennett was part of the musical-comedy stage production Peggy Ann at the Million Dollar Theater. The other entertainment was provided by the screening of the W. C. Fields movie, Old-Fashioned Way (1934). Dennett shared the bill with thirty other players including Frank Gallagher, Bobby Dale, Helen Wright, and Dorothy Castleman. The presentation of Peggy-Ann was enlivened by dancing and singing choruses. Audiences were pleased and the show was repeated four times a day on some days.

A production of Alt Heidelberg was presented at the Shrine Auditorium in October 1937. Engel portrayed Gretchen in the theatrical production. Others contributing to the musical version of the play were Henry Mowbray, Paul Keast, Milton Tilly, and Manilla Powers. Engel performed at the Orpheum Theater in Los Angeles the same week, in March 1937, that Major Bowes headlined with his All-Girl Revue.

== Romance ==
Dennett was linked romantically with Jesse L. Lasky Jr. She became engaged to singer Geoffrey Gill in January 1933. She also was engaged to Phillip Christian St. Clair. In 1941, she was married to James L. Henderson Jr. She later married Evan Stephan Barnes in California. Stay married with until her death.

== Philanthropist ==
She donated some twenty pounds of her own red hair during a war scare about a year before the outbreak of World War II. Munitions employed the use of some fine human hair. The hair was received by the Max Factor studios. It cost $17 an ounce in twenty-two inch lengths.
