= Acklom =

Acklom is a surname. Notable people by that name include:

- Cecil Ryther Acklom (1872–1937), British officer in the Royal Navy
- Esther Acklom (1788–1818), British heiress
- George Moreby Acklom (1870–1959), British writer, editor, and critic based in New York City
- Mark Acklom (born 1973), English conman and fraudster
