= Adrienne Ames =

American actress (1907–1947)

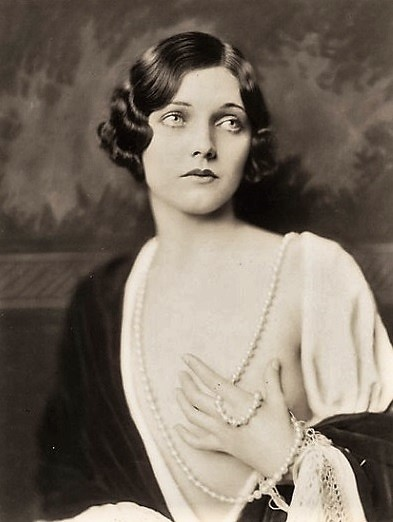
- Born: Ruth Adrienne McClure; August 3, 1903; Fort Worth, Texas, U.S.
- Died: May 31, 1947 (aged 43); New York City, U.S.
- Other names: Adrienne Truex; Adrianne Ames
- Occupation: Actress
- Years active: 1927–1940
- Spouses: Deward Truax (m. 1920; div. 1924) Stephen Ames (m. 1929; div. 1933) Bruce Cabot (m. 1933; div. 1935)
- Children: 1

Adrienne Ames (born Ruth Adrienne McClure; August 3, 1903 – May 31, 1947) was an American film actress. Early in her career she was known as Adrienne Truex.

== Career ==
=== Film ===
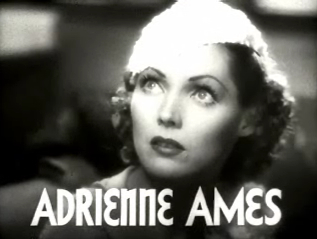
From the trailer for Woman Wanted (1935)

Ames began her film career in 1927 as a stand-in for Pola Negri. Ames was soon cast in small film roles in silent films. With the advent of talking pictures, Ames' popularity grew and she was usually cast as society women, or in musicals. She made thirty films during the 1930s with her biggest success in George White's Scandals (1934). She appeared with the three leading men from the 1931 version of Dracula (Bela Lugosi, David Manners, and Edward Van Sloan) in The Death Kiss (1932).

=== Radio ===
Ames left Hollywood for New York. In 1941, she was hostess of two talk shows on station WHN in New York City. Her schedule included broadcasts at noon and 3:30 p.m. six days a week and 7:30 p.m. broadcasts on Tuesdays, Thursdays, and Saturdays. She continued broadcasting until two weeks before her death in 1947.

=== Television ===
In December 1941, Ames began a weekly series of movie-review programs on WNBT in New York City. The 10-minute programs ran on Tuesday afternoons.

== Personal life ==
Ames was married three times. In 1920, at the age of 16 or 17, she married Derward Dumont Truax, the son of an oil businessman. They had a daughter, and divorced in 1924. A later marriage to broker Stephen Ames ended in divorce on October 30, 1933. Her last marriage, on October 31, 1933, was to fellow actor Bruce Cabot; they divorced on July 24, 1935.

== Death ==
Ames died of cancer on May 31, 1947, in New York City, aged 43. She is interred in the Oakwood Cemetery in her hometown of Fort Worth, Texas.

For her contributions to the film industry, Ames has a motion pictures star on the Hollywood Walk of Fame at 1612 Vine Street. It was dedicated February 8, 1960.

== Filmography ==
Film
Year	Title	Role	Notes
1929	Sally	Bit Part	Uncredited
1931	The Road to Reno	Unhappy Divorcee	Uncredited
1931	24 Hours	Ruby Wintringham	
1931	Girls About Town	Anne	
1931	Working Girls	Bit	Uncredited
1931	Husband's Holiday	Myrtle	
1932	Two Kinds of Women	Jean Mars	Uncredited
1932	Sinners in the Sun	Claire Kinkaid	
1932	Merrily We Go to Hell	Claire Hempstead	
1932	Guilty as Hell	Vera Marsh	
1932	The Death Kiss	Marcia Lane	
1933	From Hell to Heaven	Joan Burt	
1933	Broadway Bad	Aileen	
1933	A Bedtime Story	Paulette	
1933	Disgraced!	Julia Thorndyke	
1933	The Avenger	Ruth Knowles	
1934	George White's Scandals	Barbara Loraine	
1934	You're Telling Me!	Princess Lescaboura	
1934	The Old Fashioned Way	Girl in audience	Uncredited
1935	Gigolette	Kay Parrish	
1935	Black Sheep	Mrs. Millicent Caldwell Bath	
1935	Woman Wanted	Betty Randolph	
1935	Ladies Love Danger	Adele Michel	
1935	Abdul the Damned	Therese Alder	
1935	Harmony Lane	Jane McDowell	
1938	City Girl	Vivian Ross	Uncredited
1938	Fugitives for a Night	Eileen Baker	Credited as Adrianne Ames
1938	Slander House	Helen 'Mme. Helene' Smith	
1939	Panama Patrol	Lia Maing	
1939	The Zero Hour	Susan	
1940	I Take This Woman	Lola Estermonte	Scenes cut
