= George White's Scandals (disambiguation) =

George White's Scandals was a series of Broadway revues produced by George White that ran from 1919 to 1939.

George White's Scandals may also refer to:

- George White's Scandals (1934 film), directed by George White
- George White's 1935 Scandals, directed by George White
- George White's Scandals (1945 film), directed by Felix E. Feist
