= George Moreby Acklom =

British writer, literary critic and editor

- Born: 17 November 1870; Nagpore, Central Provinces and Berar, British India (present-day Nagpur, Maharashtra, India)
- Died: 26 October 1959 (aged 88)
- Resting place: Claremont, California, United States
- Education: Bedford Modern School; Queens' College, Cambridge
- Occupations: Writer, editor, critic
- Spouse: Lilian Manners (m.1897)
- Children: Dorothea Cecily; David Manners
- Relatives: Cecil Ryther Acklom (Brother)

George Moreby Acklom (17 November 1870 – 26 October 1959), was a British writer, editor, literary adviser and critic based in New York City, principally with the publisher E.P. Dutton, and the father of the Hollywood actor David Manners.

== Life and career ==
George Moreby Acklom was born on 17 November 1870 at Nagpore, India, to English parents. He was the brother of military figure Cecil Ryther Acklom and educated at Bedford Modern School in England, before graduating BA from Queens' College, Cambridge in 1891.

After his graduation from Cambridge, Acklom went to Canada, where he was initially employed as headmaster of Harrow House School in Halifax, Nova Scotia. He then moved to New York City in 1907 to start a career as a literary critic and editor with E.P. Dutton Publishing Company.

Acklom was a prolific book reviewer, editor, translator and contributor. He wrote the introduction to Richard Maurice Bucke's book Cosmic Consciousness: A Study in the Evolution of the Human Mind, which had originally been published by E.P. Dutton in 1901. He was also an editor of John Denison Champlin's encyclopaedia, publisher of research and critiques on the life of the novelist Samuel Butler, and the translator of The Red Gods.

Acklom married Lilian Manners in 1897 and they had two children, both of whom were born in Nova Scotia: Dorothea Cecily in 1898 and Rauff de Ryther Daun Acklom in 1900. Rauff, who later in life became a very successful actor in the United States, used the stage name David Manners during his career in theatre and in Hollywood films. Acklom died on 26 October 1959 and was buried in Oak Park Cemetery in Claremont, a city located on the eastern edge of Los Angeles County, California.

== Selected bibliography ==
- Margaret: an idyll. Portland, Maine: Smith & Sale, 1898.
- "In Memoriam", a sonnet published in Century of Canadian Sonnets. Toronto: Musson Book Company Limited, 1910.
- Jekyl Island Club, Brunswick, Georgia 1916. New York, N.Y.: Photogravure & Color Company, 1919.
- Introduction to Cosmic Consciousness: a study in the evolution of the human mind by Canadian psychiatrist Richard Maurice Bucke. New York, N.Y.: E.P. Dutton, 1923.
- Translator of The Red Gods by French novelist Jean d'Esme. New York, N.Y.: E.P. Dutton, 1924.
- Seventy-five years; or, The joys and sorrows of publishing and selling books at Duttons, from 1852 to 1927. New York, N.Y.: E.P. Hutton, 1927.
- Winter Vigil. New York, N.Y.: Harold Vinal, 1928.
- Editor of The New Champlin Cyclopedia For Young Folks. New York, N.Y.: H. Holt & Company, 1933.
- Hamlet and the Demon. Hastings-on-Hudson, New York: Privately published, 1937.
