= The Red Gods =

- Title page for Les Dieux rouges (1946 edition)
- Author: Jean d'Esme
- Original title: Les Dieux rouges
- Language: French
- Genre: adventure novel
- Publisher: La Renaissance du livre
- Publication date: 1923
- Preceded by: Thi-Bâ, fille d'Annam
- Followed by: L'Âme de la brousse

The Red Gods (French: Les Dieux rouges) is an adventure novel with elements of lost world fantasy, written by French writer Jean d'Esme.

== Overview ==
The Red Gods finds its locale in the mountainous areas of Indochina. The geographical description of the novel's setting closely resembles that of modern-day Laos. The novel is frame-narrated by Jacob Bressond – a friend of the protagonist – Pierre de Lursac. It is a tale of the protagonist's escape from Indochina, a region ruled and corrupted by its French rulers. On escaping the region, however, he finds himself fighting in World War I, during which he dies. He spends some time in a place characterized by endemic and unseen flora and fauna, inhabited by hunter-gatherers and ruled by priestesses that perform elaborate sacrificial ceremonies.

== Release and translations ==
The book was originally published in French by La Renaissance du livre in 1923. It was translated into English by George Moreby Acklom and released as The Red Gods in 1924 by E. P. Dutton. The same year, it was published in Russian as Красные боги. The Red Gods is the book that brought Jean d'Esme most fame, and remains his only work ever translated into English. It was reissued numerous times in French in the subsequent years, and published in Polish as Czerwone bogi in 1990.
