= Buy Me That Town =

1941 film by Eugene Forde

- Theatrical release poster
- Directed by: Eugene Forde
- Screenplay by: Murray Boltinoff; Harry A. Gourfair; Gordon Kahn; Martin Rackin
- Produced by: Sol C. Siegel
- Starring: Lloyd Nolan; Constance Moore; Albert Dekker; Sheldon Leonard; Barbara Jo Allen; Edward Brophy; Warren Hymer
- Cinematography: Theodor Sparkuhl
- Edited by: William Shea
- Music by: Victor Young
- Production company: Paramount Pictures
- Distributed by: Paramount Pictures
- Release date: October 3, 1941
- Running time: 70 minutes
- Country: United States
- Language: English

Buy Me That Town is a 1941 American comedy film directed by Eugene Forde and written by Murray Boltinoff, Harry A. Gourfair, Gordon Kahn and Martin Rackin. The film stars Lloyd Nolan, Constance Moore, Albert Dekker, Sheldon Leonard, Barbara Jo Allen, Edward Brophy and Warren Hymer. The film was released on October 3, 1941, by Paramount Pictures.

== Plot ==
After racketeer Chink Moran is drafted by the Army, his second-in-command Rickey Dean decides that the gang is no longer relevant and shuts things down. He and his pal Louie Lanzer leave NY to travel the country and decide what to do next. Their speeding car is stopped outside a tiny Connecticut village, and they're brought up before Judge Paradise and his beautiful clerk Virginia, who naturally arouses Rickey's interest. They're fined what they deem to be an inordinate amount, and not having the cash on them, accept jail time until their attorney can wire the money to bail them out.

The judge explains to Rickey that the town has been bankrupt since the local factory shut down. But because it's unincorporated, it's free to raise revenue through huge fines. This gives Rickey a brainstorm and he actually purchases the town, intending to turn it into a haven where fugitives can hide out safely in jail by simply refusing to pay the fines. He recruits some of his old gang members for civic positions like police and fire chiefs (the latter position filled by, of course, an arsonist). Louie meanwhile finds himself a potential girl friend in the person of their landlady Henriette, who turns out to be a gangster groupie and wants to be his "mole" (mispronouncing "moll").

Virginia appeals to Rickey to do something worthwhile, like reopen the factory and upgrade the town's facilities. Swayed by her charms, he begins investing in the town and helping to modernize it. But then Chink is released from the Army; he arrives in town and decides to deal himself in, but his ideas for illegal activities clash with the now-converted Rickey's plans. Things escalate toward an inevitable showdown, with Louie the linchpin in their battle for the town's future.

== Cast ==
- Lloyd Nolan as Rickey Deane
- Constance Moore as Virginia Paradise
- Albert Dekker as Louie Lanzer
- Sheldon Leonard as Chink Moran
- Barbara Jo Allen as Henriette Teagarden
- Edward Brophy as Ziggy
- Warren Hymer as Crusher Howard
- Horace McMahon as Fingers Flint
- Richard Carle as Judge Paradise
- Olin Howland as Constable Sam Smedley
- Rod Cameron as Gerard
- Russell Hicks as Malcolm
- Charles Lane as J. Montague Gainsborough
- Edwin Maxwell as P.V. Baxter
- Pierre Watkin as Carlton Williams
- Jack Chapin as Tom
- Keith Richards as Harry
- Trevor Bardette as George
- John Harmon as Heckler
- Si Jenks as Heckler
- Guy Usher as Norton
- Broderick O'Farrell as Moffett
- Jack W. Johnston as Buckley
- Lillian Yarbo as Nancy
- Ella Neal as Mother
- Harry C. Bradley as Reverend Brooks
- George Chandler as Smedley Son-In-Law
- Phil Tead as Mr. Ramsey, Druggist
- Blanche Rose as Mrs. O'Hara
- Joe Bautista as Butler
