= Meet the Boyfriend =

1937 film by Ralph Staub

- Directed by: Ralph Staub
- Written by: Robert Arthur (story); Jack Raymond (story); Bradford Ropes (writer)
- Produced by: Colbert Clark (associate producer)
- Starring: Robert Paige; Carol Hughes; Warren Hymer; Pert Kelton; Andrew Tombes
- Cinematography: Ernest Miller
- Edited by: William Morgan
- Music by: Alberto Colombo
- Production company: Republic Pictures
- Distributed by: Republic Pictures
- Release date: July 12, 1937
- Running time: 63 minutes 53 minutes (USA edited versions)
- Country: United States
- Language: English

Meet the Boyfriend is a 1937 American film directed by Ralph Staub.

== Plot summary ==
A heartthrob singer, Tony Page, also known as "America's Boyfriend", decides to wed a Swedish actress. His manager doesn't want this because he is afraid of Tony losing female fans, so he takes up a $300,000 insurance policy if Tony does in fact wed. Tony soon meets a girl named June Delaney on a bus who doesn't swoon over him like other girls. He falls for her but doesn't know her true identity.

== Cast ==
- Robert Paige as Tony Page
- Carol Hughes as June Delaney
- Warren Hymer as Wilbur 'Bugs' Corrigan
- Pert Kelton as Beulah Potts
- Andrew Tombes as J. Ardmore Potts
- Gwili Andre as Vilma Vlare
- Ed 'Oscar' Platt as Oscar
- Lou Fulton as Elmer
- Smiley Burnette as Orchestra Leader
- Leonid Kinskey as Dr. Sokoloff
- Syd Saylor as Buddy
- Selmer Jackson as Madison
- Cy Kendall as Walters
- Robert Middlemass as McGrath
- Mary Gordon as Mrs. Grimes

== Soundtrack ==
- "Sweet Lips (Kiss My Blues Away)" (Written by Harry Tobias and Roy Ingraham)
- "You Are My Rosebud" (Music by Alberto Colombo / Lyrics by Smiley Burnette)
- "Singing My Hillbilly Song" (Written by Smiley Burnette)
- "To Know You Care" (Written by Harry Tobias and Roy Ingraham)
- "This Business of Love" (Written by Harry Tobias and Roy Ingraham)

== Critical reception ==
Motion Picture Herald gave a positive review and described the film as "A lightweight concoction of song, romance and comedy." Although finding the storyline to be "the "boy meets girl" formula with no plot maneuvers to make the affair different or outstanding", the reviewer felt that the film was enjoyable and well supported by a cast of "pleasing if not prominently known players."

Variety considered this to be a poor film, with no notable cast members and "without b.o. (box office) prospects", and described it as a "farce without laughs." It commented "Scripters, director and cast go way overboard for comedy; little excuse for such clumsy writing."
