= Ex-Champ =

1939 film directed by Phil Rosen

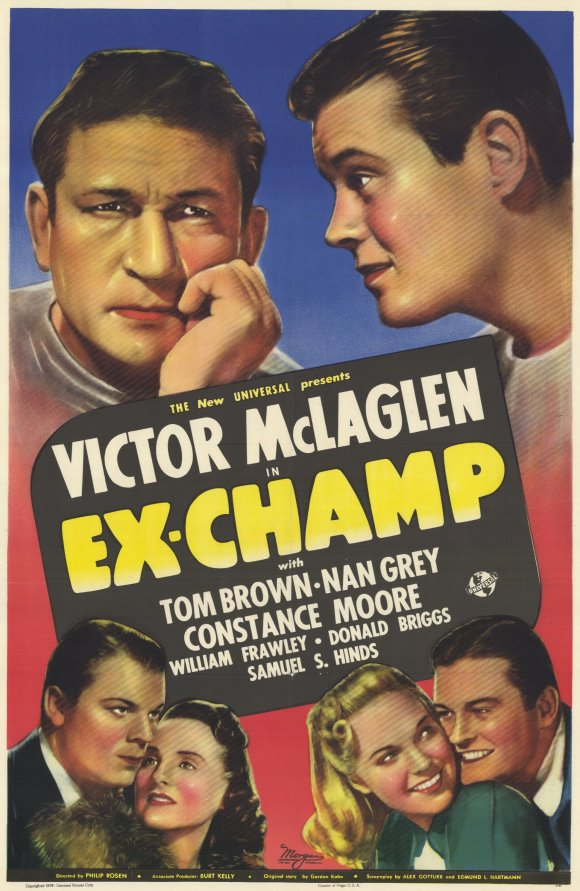
- Poster for the film
- Directed by: Phil Rosen
- Screenplay by: Alex Gottlieb; Edmund L. Hartmann
- Story by: Gordon Kahn
- Produced by: Burt Kelly
- Starring: Victor McLaglen; Tom Brown; Nan Grey
- Cinematography: Elwood Bredell
- Edited by: Bernard W. Burton
- Music by: Charles Previn
- Production company: Universal Pictures
- Release date: June 16, 1939 (US)
- Running time: 72 minutes
- Country: United States
- Language: English

Ex-Champ is a 1939 American drama film, directed by Phil Rosen. It stars Victor McLaglen, Tom Brown, and Nan Grey, and was released on June 16, 1939.

== Plot ==
Tom Grey is a former boxing champ who has fallen on hard times and is now working as a doorman in an apartment building. He has been a single parent, raising his son, Jeffrey, and daughter, Joan. Jeffrey has graduated from college and now works on Wall Street. Tom has taken a young boxer under his wing, Bob Hill, who has worked his way up to a shot at the title. He is also dating Tom's daughter.

Meanwhile, Jeffrey has gotten engaged to Doris Courtney, a high society woman, who lives in the luxury apartment building where Tom is now the doorman. In order to finance his lavish lifestyle, he embezzles funds from his firm and loses them all. When his father finds out, he fears for his son, although the son feels nothing but shame towards his father. Tom cannot bear the thought of his son going to prison, so he scrapes together enough money, and tells his son to bet against Bob in the upcoming championship match. He then makes arrangements for Bob to throw the match. However, through several mix-ups, Jeffrey actually bets on Bob, who then goes on to win the championship.

== Cast ==
- Victor McLaglen as Tom Grey
- Tom Brown as Bob Hill
- Nan Grey as Joan Grey
- William Frawley as Mushy Harrington
- Constance Moore as Doris Courtney
- Donald Briggs as Jeffrey Grey
- Samuel S. Hinds as Commissioner Nash
- Thurston Hall as Mr. Courtney
- Marc Lawrence as Bill Crosley
- Charles Halton as Trilby

== Reception ==
The New York Daily News gave the film a good review, saying that while it used an old concept about an aging boxer, the film "acquires an individual appeal from the calibre of its cast and the injection of new angles into and old formula". The Spokesman-Review also enjoyed the film, it "is good entertainment, — plenty of action, plenty of drama and plenty of humor". They complimented McLaglen's performance, and gave special applause to the work of William Frawley as McLaglen's sidekick. The Philadelphia Inquirer was less impressed with the picture, calling it a "sentimental story" which relied heavily on "film and fictional cliches" which ended in a "maudlin haze". They felt that McLaglen's performance was "sappy rather than sympathetic". They felt that Brown was not believable albeit pleasant, and that Moore and Frawley struggled in their roles. The Film Daily gave the picture a lukewarm review, saying that it was "made for the thrill trade who do not inquire too closely into plot construction, this one shapes up as a fairly exciting story of the prize ring." The felt the direction and cinematography were just okay.
