= Gordon Kahn =

American screenwriter (1902–1962)

- Born: Gordon Jacques Kahn; May 11, 1902; Szigetvár, Transleithania, Austria-Hungary
- Died: December 31, 1962 (aged 60); Manchester, New Hampshire, USA
- Citizenship: American
- Education: Yale University
- Alma mater: Columbia University
- Occupation: Screenwriter
- Spouse: Barbara Brodie
- Children: Tony Kahn
- Writing career
- Years active: 1919–1962
- Genre: Motion pictures
- Notable work: Hollywood on Trial (1948 book)
- Movement: Hollywood blacklist

Gordon Kahn (1902–1962) was an American writer and screenwriter who was blacklisted during the McCarthy era; he is the father of broadcaster and author Tony Kahn.

== Background ==
Gordon Jacques Kahn was born on May 11, 1901, in Szigetvár, Hungary. When he was six years old, he and his parents moved to the Lower East Side of Manhattan in the United States of America. In 1918, Kahn graduated from Townsend Harris High School in New York City. He spent the next year at Yale University, then took up studies at Columbia University

== Career ==
While studying at Yale, Kahn became a reporter for the Bridgeport Star.

=== New York ===
In New York, he worked for the New York Herald and Zitt's Theatrical Weekly, the latter for which he wrote a Broadway column in the style of Samuel Pepys. In 1922, he wrote a book called Manhattan Oases about speakeasies, illustrated by his roommate of the time, Al Hirschfeld. For much of the 1920s, Kahn wrote for the New York Daily Mirror.

=== Hollywood ===
In 1930, former Mirror colleague Samuel Marx (later head of scenery at MGM), invited Kahn to move to Hollywood and try his luck as a screenwriter. He wrote more than a script a year (well over two dozen) in a period under two decades. Writing credits include: The Death Kiss (1932), Newsboys' Home (1938), and Buy Me That Town (1941).

Kahn joined several leftist and liberal causes and helped found the Screen Writers Guild (now Writers Guild of America). He was the first managing editor of The Screen Writer.

=== Hollywood blacklist ===
In 1947, when the House Un-American Activities Committee (HUAC) began its hearings on "Communist infiltration," Kahn was one of the "Nineteen Unfriendlies" subpoenaed. He was not called to testify and so did not become one of the Hollywood Ten. Soon after December 1947, however, when the Studios announced the firing of the Hollywood Ten, Kahn lost his job at Warner Bros. Studios. In 1948, he published Hollywood on Trial.

Kahn sold his 13-room Beverly Hills home, and he and his family moved into a smaller house in Studio City. In 1950, fearing arrest, he fled to Cuernavaca, Mexico. His wife and sons Jim and Tony joined him six months later. The Kahns lived there until low funds in 1956, after which they returned to the United States and lived in Manchester, New Hampshire.

Kahn used the pseudonym "Hugh G. Foster" to write magazine articles for Holiday and Atlantic Monthly, but he never wrote scripts for Hollywood again.

== Personal life and death ==
Kahn married Barbara Brodie; they had two sons.

Kahn is described as a "man who affected a beard and monocle." One FBI report noted that Kahn had "a facial resemblance to Lenin."

Gordon Kahn died age 61 on December 31, 1962, of a heart attack during a snowstorm in Manchester.

== Works ==
Film Screenplays:

- 1931: X Marks the Spot
- 1932: The Death Kiss
- 1934: The Crosby Case, Mama Runs Wild, The People's Enemy
- 1935: Gigolette
- 1937: Navy Blues (1937 film), The Sheik Steps Out
- 1938: I Stand Accused, Newsboys' Home, Tenth Avenue Kid
- 1939: Ex-Champ, Mickey the Kid, S.O.S. Tidal Wave, Ex-Champ
- 1940: Wolf of New York
- 1941: Buy Me That Town, World Premiere
- 1942: Northwest Rangers, A Yank on the Burma Road
- 1944: Cowboy and the Senorita, Lights of Old Santa Fe, Song of Nevada
- 1945: Two O'Clock Courage
- 1946: Blonde Alibi, Her Kind of Man
- 1948: Whiplash (1948 film), Ruthless (film)
- 1949: Streets of San Francisco (film)

Television:

- 1956: The Adventures of Robin Hood - screenplay for 1 episode as "Norman Best"

Books:

- Manhattan Oases illustrated by Al Hirschfeld (1922) (2003)
- Recent American History (1933)
- Hollywood on Trial (1948)

== Legacy ==
Kahn is the subject of his son Tony's 1987 short documentary The Day the Cold War Came Home.

Blacklisted, a docu-drama in six half-hour episodes that first aired on National Public Radio in 1997, chronicles the last fifteen years of Gordon Kahn's life and the fears and ordeal his family experienced. It was written, produced, and narrated by Gordon Kahn's son Tony Kahn. All of the words of Gordon and his wife Barbara were drawn from their writings, diaries, and letters. The words put in the mouth of J. Edgar Hoover were all derived from a confidential 3,000-page FBI surveillance file on Gordon Kahn dated from 1944 to 1962.

== See also ==
- Tony Kahn
- Hollywood blacklist
