= Broadway Bad =

1933 film

- Film poster
- Directed by: Sidney Lanfield
- Screenplay by: Maude Fulton
- Story by: William R. Lipman; A. Washington Pezet
- Produced by: Sol M. Wurtzel
- Starring: Joan Blondell; Ricardo Cortez; Ginger Rogers; Adrienne Ames; Francis McDonald
- Cinematography: George Barnes
- Edited by: Paul Weatherwax
- Music by: Hugo Friedhofer; Arthur Lange
- Production company: Fox Film Corporation
- Distributed by: Fox Film Corporation
- Release date: February 24, 1933
- Running time: 61 minutes
- Country: United States
- Language: English

Broadway Bad is a 1933 American Pre-Code drama film directed by Sidney Lanfield and written by Maude Fulton. The film stars Joan Blondell, Ricardo Cortez, Ginger Rogers, Adrienne Ames, and Francis McDonald. The film was released on February 24, 1933, by Fox Film Corporation.

== Plot ==
Married chorus girl rides scandal to stardom.

== Cast ==
- Joan Blondell as Tony Landers
- Ricardo Cortez as Craig Cutting
- Ginger Rogers as Flip Daly
- Adrienne Ames as Aileen
- Allen Vincent as Bob North
- Francis McDonald as Charley Davis
- Frederick Burton as Robert North, Sr
- Donald Crisp as Darrall
