= Warren Hymer =

American actor (1906–1948)

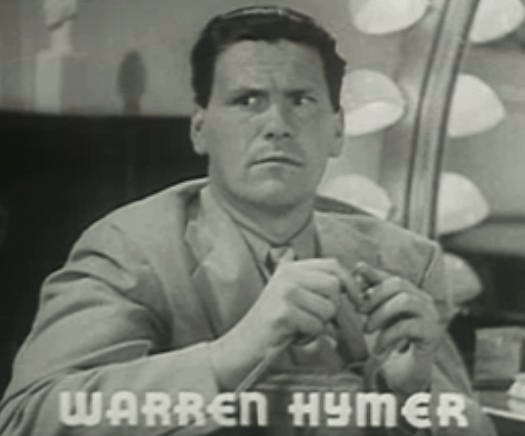
- Hymer in Meet the Boyfriend (1938)
- Born: Edgar Warren Hymer; February 25, 1906; New York City, U.S.
- Died: March 25, 1948 (aged 42); Los Angeles, California, U.S.
- Resting place: Chapel of the Pines Crematory
- Occupation: Actor
- Years active: 1929–1946

Edgar Warren Hymer (February 25, 1906 – March 25, 1948) was an American theatre and film actor.

== Early life ==
He was born in New York City. His father, John Bard Hymer (1875/1876 – 1953) was a playwright (with nine Broadway plays to his credit, according to the Internet Broadway Database), vaudeville writer and actor, while his mother, Eleanor Kent, was an actress.

== Career ==
He appeared in 129 films between 1929 and 1946, as well as the 1928 Broadway play The Grey Fox. Despite his typical screen persona as an unsophisticated tough guy with a Brooklyn accent, he actually attended Yale University. With his burly frame and good-natured grin, he almost always played punch-drunk prizefighters, affable soldiers or sailors, or Runyonesque gangsters. He had only two leading roles: opposite Buster Keaton in Keaton's comeback short subject The Gold Ghost (1934), and as one of a trio of mobsters hired to assassinate Adolf Hitler in Hitler: Dead or Alive (1943).

In a famous Hollywood anecdote, Columbia Pictures head Harry Cohn had Hymer removed from the studio after he showed up for work drunk. Hymer responded by breaking into Cohn's office and urinating on his desk. Cohn ordered the desk to be burned, then tried to blackball Hymer in the film industry. The incident probably happened in 1939, during the filming of Hymer's last Columbia assignment, The Lady and the Mob. Cohn's warning to other studios to avoid Hymer was effective in the short term -- Hymer had only two assignments in 1940. Cohn's ace director Frank Capra, who had angrily left Cohn's employ, broke the Cohn curse by hiring Hymer for his 1941 feature Meet John Doe. From then on, Warren Hymer was working steadily again. He made up for lost time by accepting more frequent work at smaller studios like Monogram and PRC, between more prestigious assignments at larger studios.

Perhaps Warren Hymer's most unusual role was in the 1941 Monogram feature Phantom Killer. Hymer, in his usual Brooklynesque dumb-bell character, played the slow-witted assistant to police lieutenant Kenneth Harlan. Harlan could not finish the picture due to a brief illness, and the quickie production couldn't wait, so Harlan's character was fatally wounded and Hymer took over as senior officer. Grimly resolving to avenge Harlan's death, and suddenly losing all vestiges of dumbness, Hymer played the rest of the movie straight, in his own, dialect-free voice.

== Death ==
Hymer experienced severe health issues in his last years, slowing his work schedule. Illness forced him to retire from the screen in 1946, and he remained "seriously ill for over a year." He died in 1948 in Los Angeles, California, the cause of death listed as a stomach ailment. His remains are interred at Chapel of the Pines Crematory.

== Filmography ==
- The Far Call (1929) - Soup Brophy (silent)
- Speakeasy (1929) - Cannon Delmont
- Fox Movietone Follies of 1929 (1929) - Martin
- The Cock-Eyed World (1929) - Marine Corporal Scout (uncredited)
- The Girl from Havana (1929) - Spike Howard
- Frozen Justice (1929) - Bartender
- The Lone Star Ranger (1930) - Bowery Kid
- Men Without Women (1930) - Kaufman
- Born Reckless (1930) - Big Shot
- Up the River (1930) - Dannemora Dan
- Sinners' Holiday (1930) - Mitch
- Oh, For a Man! (1930) - "Pug" Morini
- Men on Call (1930) - Joe Burke
- The Seas Beneath (1931) - "Lug" Kaufman
- Charlie Chan Carries On (1931) - Max Minchin
- Goldie (1931) - Spike Moore
- The Spider (1931) - Schmidt (uncredited)
- The Unholy Garden (1931) - Smiley Corbin
- Love is a Racket (1932) - Burney Olds
- The Night Mayor (1932) - Riley
- Hold 'Em Jail (1932) - Steele
- One Way Passage (1932) - Steve Burke
- Madison Square Garden (1932) - Brassie Randall
- 20,000 Years in Sing Sing (1932) - Hype
- The Billion Dollar Scandal (1932) - Kid McGurn
- The Mysterious Rider (1933) - Jitney Smith
- A Lady's Profession (1933) - Nutty Bolton
- Midnight Mary (1933) - Angelo
- I Love That Man (1933) - Mousey
- Her First Mate (1933) - Percy
- My Woman (1933) - Al, Butler (uncredited)
- In the Money (1933) - Gunboat Bimms
- King for a Night (1933) - Goofy
- Roast Beef and Movies (1934, Short) - Man at Gunpoint in Fictitious Film Scene (uncredited)
- The Crosby Case (1934) - Sam Collins
- The Gold Ghost (1934, Short) - Bugs Kelly
- George White's Scandals (1934) - Pete Pandos - Greek Wrestler
- Woman Unafraid (1934) - John
- One Is Guilty (1934) - "Knock-Out" Walters
- Little Miss Marker (1934) - Canvas Back
- The Cat's-Paw (1934) - 'Spike' Slattery
- She Loves Me Not (1934) - Mugg Schnitzel
- Young and Beautiful (1934) - The Champion
- Belle of the Nineties (1934) - St. Louis Fighter
- Kid Millions (1934) - Louie the Lug
- The Gilded Lily (1935) - Taxi Driver
- The Case of the Curious Bride (1935) - Oscar Pender
- Hold 'Em Yale (1935) - Sam, The Gonoph
- Silk Hat Kid (1935) - Misty
- The Daring Young Man (1935) - Pete Hogan
- Dante's Inferno (1935) - Bozo - a Stoker (uncredited)
- She Gets Her Man (1935) - Spike
- Navy Wife (1935) - Butch
- Our Little Girl (1935)
- Confidential (1935) - "Midget" Regan
- Hong Kong Nights (1935) - Wally
- Show Them No Mercy! (1935) - Gimp
- The Widow from Monte Carlo (1935) - Dopey Mullins
- Hitch Hike Lady (1935) - Cluck Regan
- The Leavenworth Case (1936) - Detective O'Malley
- Tango (1936) - Joe Sloan, Betty's Boyfriend
- King of the Islands (1936, Short) - A Shipwrecked Sailor
- Laughing Irish Eyes (1936) - Tiger O'Keefe
- Everybody's Old Man (1936) - Mike Murphy
- Mr. Deeds Goes to Town (1936) - Bodyguard (uncredited)
- A Message to Garcia (1936) - Departing Sailor (uncredited)
- Desert Justice (1936) - Hymie
- Nobody's Fool (1936) - Sour Puss
- San Francisco (1936) - Hazeltine
- Rhythm on the Range (1936) - Big Brain
- 36 Hours to Kill (1936) - Hazy
- Love Letters of a Star (1936) - Chuck
- You Only Live Once (1937) - Buggsy
- She's Dangerous (1937) - Herman Valentz
- Join the Marines (1937) - Herman
- Navy Blues (1937) - Gerald "Biff" Jones
- We Have Our Moments (1937) - Smacksey
- Married Before Breakfast (1937) - Harry
- Meet the Boyfriend (1937) - Wilbur "Bugs" Corrigan
- Wake Up and Live (1937) - First Gunman
- Sea Racketeers (1937) - Mate 'Spud' Jones
- Bad Guy (1937) - 'Shorty'
- Ali Baba Goes to Town (1937) - Tramp
- Telephone Operator (1937) - Shorty
- Lady Behave! (1937) - Butch
- Bluebeard's Eighth Wife (1938) - Kid Mulligan
- Arson Gang Busters (1938) - Tom Jones
- Joy of Living (1938) - Mike
- You and Me (1938) - Gimpy
- Gateway (1938) - Guard-Waiter
- Submarine Patrol (1938) - Seaman Rocky Haggerty
- Thanks for Everything (1938) - Marine Sergeant
- The Lady and the Mob (1939) - Frankie O'Fallon
- Mr. Moto in Danger Island (1939) - Twister McGurk
- Boy Friend (1939) - Greenberg
- Coast Guard (1939) - Lancelot O'Hara
- Calling All Marines (1939) - Snooker
- Destry Rides Again (1939) - Bugs Watson
- Charlie McCarthy, Detective (1939) - Dutch
- I Can't Give You Anything But Love, Baby (1940) - Big Foot Louie
- Love, Honor, and Oh Baby! (1940) - Bull
- Meet John Doe (1941) - Angelface
- Reaching for the Sun (1941) - Percy Shelley
- Buy Me That Town (1941) - Crusher Howard
- Birth of the Blues (1941) - Limpy
- Skylark (1941) - Big Man in Subway Car
- Torpedo Boat (1942) - Marine
- Jail House Blues (1942) - Big Foot Louie
- Mr. Wise Guy (1942) - Dratler
- Girls' Town (1942) - Joe
- So's Your Aunt Emma (1942) - Joe
- Dr. Broadway (1942) - Maxie the Goat
- She's in the Army (1942) - Cpl. Buck Shane
- One Thrilling Night (1942) - Pat Callahan
- Henry and Dizzy (1942) - Tramp at Picnic
- Lure of the Islands (1942) - Albert, a gendarme
- Baby Face Morgan (1942) - Wise Willie
- Police Bullets (1942) - Gabby Walsh
- Phantom Killer (1942) - Police Sgt. Pete Corrigan
- Hitler – Dead or Alive (1942) - Hans '"Dutch" Havermann
- Spy Train (1943) - Herman Krantz
- Danger! Women at Work (1943) - Pete
- Gangway for Tomorrow (1943) - Pete
- Government Girl (1943) - Military Police Sergeant (uncredited)
- Since You Went Away (1944) - Convalescent Wishing for Tutti Frutti (uncredited)
- Three Is a Family (1944) - Coolie
- The Affairs of Susan (1945) - Waiter (uncredited)
- Joe Palooka, Champ (1946) - Ira Eyler
- Gentleman Joe Palooka (1946) - Louie - Sparring Partner
