= Phantom Killer (film) =

1942 film by William Beaudine

- Directed by: William Beaudine
- Written by: Karl Brown
- Produced by: A.W. Hackel
- Cinematography: Marcel Le Picard
- Edited by: Jack Ogilvie
- Music by: Frank Sanucci
- Distributed by: Monogram Pictures
- Release date: October 2, 1942
- Country: United States

Phantom Killer is a 1942 American romantic mystery film directed by William Beaudine, and starring Dick Purcell, Joan Woodbury and John Hamilton. The film is a remake of Phil Rosen's The Sphinx.

== Plot ==
A series of murders seems to implicate a deaf-mute philanthropist, except he has ironclad alibis for all of them. Besides, he has spoken to at least one man who was nearby when the latest killing occurs.

== Cast ==
- Dick Purcell as Edward Clark
- Joan Woodbury as Barbara Mason
- John Hamilton as John G. Harrison
- Warren Hymer as Police Sgt. Pete Corrigan
- Mantan Moreland as Nicodemus
- J. Farrell MacDonald as Police Captain
- Gayne Whitman as District Attorney John W. Rogers
- Kenneth Harlan as Police Lt. Jim Brady
- George J. Lewis as Kramer
- Karl Hackett as Defense Attorney
- Harry Depp as Lester P. Cutler
- Isabel La Mal as Mable
- Robert Carson as Dave Rigby
- Frank Ellis as Kelsey
