= Mama Runs Wild =

1937 film by Ralph Staub

- Theatrical release poster
- Directed by: Ralph Staub
- Screenplay by: Gordon Kahn; Hal Yates
- Story by: Gordon Kahn
- Produced by: Ralph Staub
- Starring: Mary Boland; Ernest Truex; William "Bill" Henry; Lynne Roberts; Max Terhune; Joseph Crehan
- Cinematography: Ernest Miller
- Edited by: Edward Mann
- Music by: Alberto Colombo
- Production company: Republic Pictures
- Distributed by: Republic Pictures
- Release date: December 22, 1937
- Running time: 67 minutes
- Country: United States
- Language: English

Mama Runs Wild is a 1937 American comedy film directed by Ralph Staub and written by Gordon Kahn and Hal Yates. The film stars Mary Boland, Ernest Truex, William "Bill" Henry, Lynne Roberts, Max Terhune and Joseph Crehan. The film was released on December 22, 1937, by Republic Pictures.

== Plot ==
Alice Summers becomes an honorary police captain after she helps two bank robbers get caught using fingerprints they left in her purse; now her objective is to keep criminals out of her town.

== Cast ==
- Mary Boland as Alice Summers
- Ernest Truex as Ernest Summers
- William "Bill" Henry as Paul Fowler
- Lynne Roberts as Edith Summers
- Max Terhune as Applegate
- Joseph Crehan as Tom Fowler
- Dorothy Page as Mrs. Hayes
- Dewey Robinson as Greengable
- Julius Tannen as C. Preston Simms
- Sammy McKim as Boy
- John Sheehan as Snodey
- James C. Morton as Adams
