= Tony Kahn =

American broadcaster

Tony Kahn is an American broadcaster, published author, scholar and son of the blacklisted screenwriter Gordon Kahn.

== Life ==
Kahn grew up in Los Angeles, the son of Hollywood screenwriter Gordon Kahn and Barbara Brodie Kahn. He joined his family in Cuernavaca, Mexico, where his father had fled in the 1950s during the Red Scare, when he was five years old. Ultimately, the family returned to the United States and Kahn graduated magna cum laude from Harvard University, where he was also Phi Beta Kappa. Kahn also holds a master's degree in Slavic studies from Columbia University.

== Work ==
Kahn has produced work in various media but is best known for his work in public radio, and is a regular panelist on the public radio quiz show Says You! He produced and directed the WGBH program Morning Stories and hosted its podcast version., public radio's first. He was the original host of PRI's The World, and a contributor to Minnesota Public Radio's Savvy Traveler. From 1982 to 1985, Kahn hosted a regular social commentary segment on WCVB-TV's nightly newsmagazine Chronicle.

Kahn produced, wrote, and narrated Blacklisted, a six-part public radio series about his childhood as the son of a blacklisted screenwriter, starring Ron Leibman and Carroll O'Connor and featuring Stockard Channing, Eli Wallach, Julie Harris, Jerry Stiller, Spalding Gray, Scott Simon, Susan Stamberg, and Daniel Schorr. He has won numerous broadcasting awards including twelve New England Emmys, six Gold Medals of the New York International Festival, the Ace Award, three Gabriel Awards, the Edward R. Murrow Award for Feature Reporting.

Kahn is also the author and illustrator of two graphic memoirs, "Fugitive: My Boyhood Under the Hollywood Blacklist" and "Walloped: A Story of Father and Sons," and a play, "Hound and Fox: A Cold War Affair."

=== Translation ===
- The Day is Born of Darkness by Mikhail Dyomin, ISBN 0-394-49166-1, 1976
- Stolen Apples, by Yevgeny Yevtushenko.
- From Desire to Desire, by Yevgeny Yevtushenko.
- Legends from Invalid Street, by Efraim Sevela.

=== Audio ===
- Blacklisted, six-part public radio series, 1995

=== Video ===
- Mother's Little Network, producer, writer, and performer, 1974
- Media Probes. Soundaround, as writer and host, 1982
- The Day the Cold War Came Home, as producer, writer and narrator, 1987
- Here in My Arms, producer, writer and narrator, 1990
- Learning to Drive, producer, writer and narrator, 1991
- Fathers: A Family Album, 1992
- Nova, 14 programs, narrator
- Frontline, 2 programs, narrator
- Chronicle, host of closing social commentary segment (1982–1985)
