= I Stand Accused =

1938 film by John H. Auer

- Theatrical release poster
- Directed by: John H. Auer
- Screenplay by: Gordon Kahn additional dialogue Alex Gottlieb
- Produced by: John H. Auer
- Starring: Robert Cummings; Helen Mack; Lyle Talbot; Thomas Beck; Gordon Jones; Robert Paige
- Cinematography: Jack A. Marta
- Edited by: Ernest J. Nims
- Music by: Cy Feuer; William Lava
- Production company: Republic Pictures
- Distributed by: Republic Pictures
- Release date: 4 January 1939 (New York)
- Running time: 63 minutes
- Country: United States
- Language: English

I Stand Accused is a 1938 American drama film directed by John H. Auer and written by Gordon Kahn and Alex Gottlieb. The film stars Robert Cummings, Helen Mack, Lyle Talbot, Thomas Beck, Gordon Jones and Robert Paige. The film was released by Republic Pictures.

== Plot ==
Two boyhood friends, Fred and Paul, become lawyers. Fred goes to work for criminals while Paul remains honest.

== Cast ==
- Robert Cummings as Frederick A. Davis
- Helen Mack as Alison Cooper
- Lyle Talbot as Charles Eastman
- Thomas Beck as Paul V. Reynolds
- Gordon Jones as Blackie
- Robert Paige as Joe Benson
- Leona Roberts as Mrs. Davis
- Robert Middlemass as Norman L. Mitchell
- Thomas E. Jackson as Detective Gilroy
- John Hamilton as Defense Attorney Brower
- Howard Hickman as Gilbert
- Harry Stubbs as Mr. Moss
- Robert Strange as Francis X. Ryan

== Production ==
it was based on the career of lawyer Dixie Davis.

Robert Cummings had been dropped by Paramount Studios in September 1938 and found himself in less demand as an actor. "I was poison," he later said. "Not an agent would look at me." But he managed to get cast in the lead of this film. His casting was announced in September 1938.

== Reception ==
Cummings said the film was "a fluke hit. So at least I could get inside the casting agents again."
