= The Miracle Man (1932 film) =

1932 film

- Film poster
- Directed by: Norman Z. McLeod
- Written by: George M. Cohan (1914 play); Robert Hobart Davis; Samuel Hoffenstein; Frank L. Packard; Waldemar Young
- Starring: Sylvia Sidney; Chester Morris
- Cinematography: David Abel
- Distributed by: Paramount Pictures
- Release date: April 1, 1932
- Running time: 85 minutes
- Country: United States
- Language: English

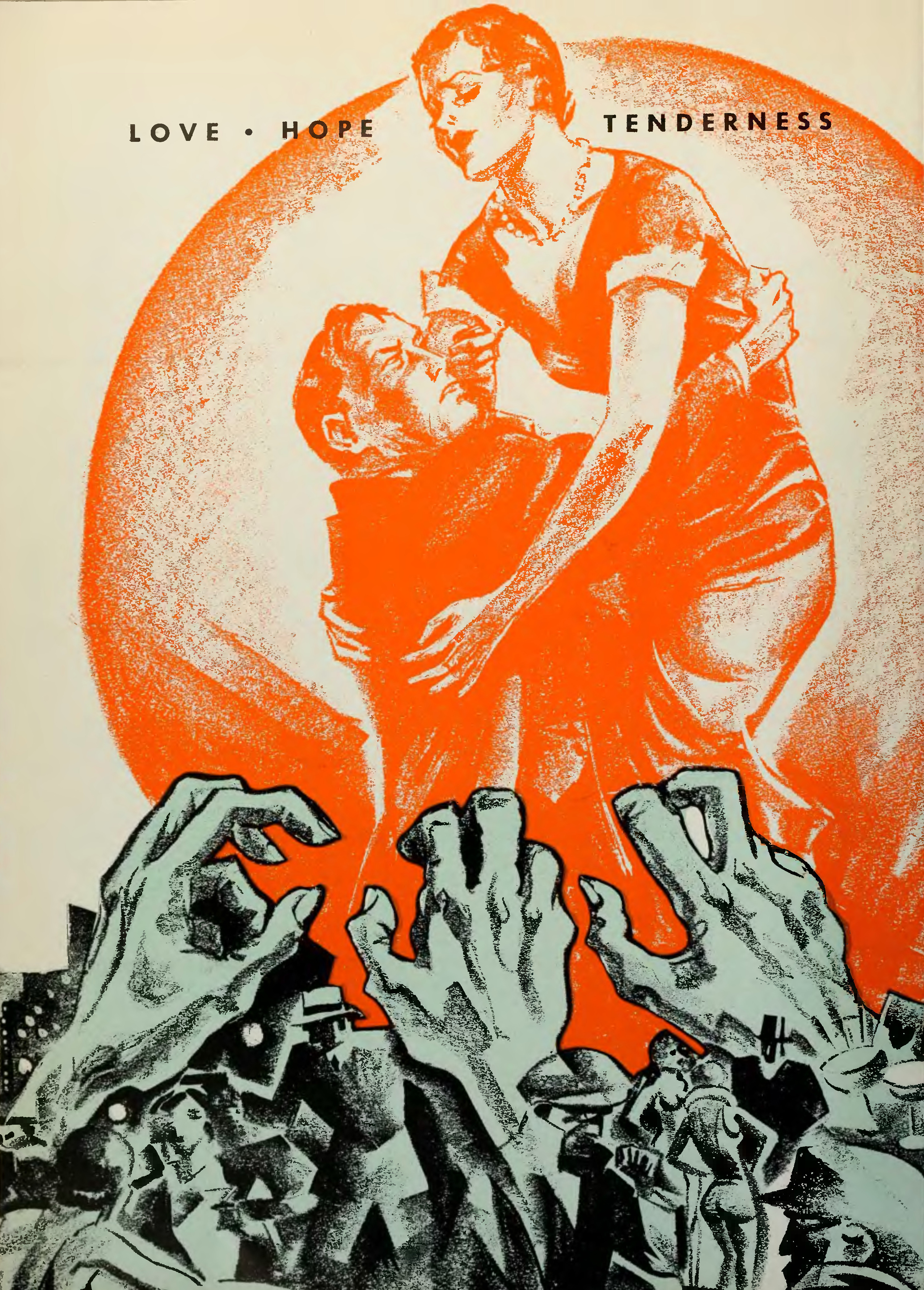
The Miracle Man ad in The Film Daily, 1932

The Miracle Man is a 1932 American pre-Code drama film directed by Norman Z. McLeod, starring Sylvia Sidney and Chester Morris, and featuring Boris Karloff. It is a remake of the 1919 film of the same name starring Lon Chaney. The film was originally supposed to star Tyrone Power Sr., as the Preacher/Patriarch, but he died before major filming got underway. His part was then completed by Hobart Bosworth.

== Plot ==
Doc, a crook in Chinatown, must flee when Nikko, a local bazaar owner, gets fresh with Doc's accomplice, Helen Smith, and Doc nearly kills him. Using the name John Madison, Doc hides out in Meadville, California, where he meets the Patriarch, a faith healer. Hoping to capitalize on the Patriarch's reputation, Doc sends for Helen to pose as the Patriarch's grand niece, Helen Vail, and she is joined by fellow crooks Frog, a contortionist, and Harry Evans, a pickpocket.

Doc stages a mock miracle in which Frog is "transformed" from a crippled state to perfect health. At the same time, however, the Patriarch heals real cripples Bobbie Holmes and Margaret Thornton, who has come to Meadville with her millionaire brother Robert for the Patriarch's miracle cure. The miracles cause a great fervor, and Doc collects money in Helen's name from scores of believers, ostensibly to build a chapel. Robert falls in love with Helen, and one night, they get stranded on his yacht and Doc flies into a jealous rage, planning to kill Robert. Later, the Patriarch is nearing death, and Helen, Frog and Harry refuse to support Doc's extortion efforts. Doc is about to abscond with the chapel money, when Robert tells him he proposed to Helen, but was turned down because she loves Doc. Suddenly sorry for his greed, Doc returns the money and swears his love to Helen as the Patriarch dies.

== Cast ==
- Sylvia Sidney as Helen Smith
- Chester Morris as John Madison
- Robert Coogan as Bobbie Holmes
- John Wray as The Frog
- Ned Sparks as Harry Evans (as Ned A. Sparks)
- Hobart Bosworth as The Patriarch
- Lloyd Hughes as Robert Thornton
- Virginia Bruce as Margaret Thornton
- Boris Karloff as Nikko
- Irving Pichel as Henry Holmes
- Frank Darien as Hiram Higgins

== See also ==
- Boris Karloff filmography
