= John Wray (actor) =

American actor

- Born: John Griffith Malloy; February 13, 1887; Philadelphia, Pennsylvania, U.S.
- Died: April 5, 1940 (aged 53); Los Angeles, California, U.S.
- Years active: 1929–1940
- Spouse: Florence Miller
- Children: 1

John Wray (born John Griffith Malloy; February 13, 1887 – April 5, 1940) was an American character actor of stage and screen.

== Early years ==
Wray was born John Griffin Malloy in Philadelphia, a son of Thomas Malloy and Elizabeth McCormack. He debuted on stage in Philadelphia in 1911 in a production of Camille at the Girard Avenue Theatre.

== Career ==
Wray left Philadelphia for New York but experienced stage fright there and returned to Philadelphia without making any theatrical contacts. From there he joined a vaudeville act that ended five weeks later in Wheeling, West Virginia. Next a repertory troupe left him stranded in Lewiston, Pennsylvania. He then found work with the Mary Emerson Company, a tour that ended 16 weeks later when sheriffs shut it down in New Philadelphia, Ohio. He returned to New York a year later, this time portraying the Second Grave Digger and the Second Actor in Hamlet at the Garden Theatre.

Wray was one of the many Broadway actors to descend on Hollywood in the aftermath of the sound revolution, and quickly appeared in a variety of substantial character roles, such as the Arnold Rothstein-like gangster in The Czar of Broadway (1930); Himmelstoss, the sadistic drill instructor in All Quiet on the Western Front (1930); and as the contortionist the Frog in the remake of The Miracle Man (1932), in the role previously played by Lon Chaney in the 1919 original.

Wray's roles grew increasingly smaller as the decade progressed but he was very visible as the starving farmer threatening to kill Gary Cooper's Longfellow Deeds in Frank Capra's classic Mr. Deeds Goes to Town (1936) and as the warden in Fritz Lang's You Only Live Once (1937).

On Broadway, Wray performed in Achilles Had a Heel (1935), Tin Pan Alley (1928), Nightstick (1927), Broadway (1926), The Enemy (1925), Silence (1924), Polly Preferred (1923), The Nightcap (1921), The Ouija Board (1920), Richelieu (1917), The Weavers (1915), When the Young Vine Blooms (1915), Hamlet (1913), and The Merchant of Venice (1913). As a playwright he co-authored Nightstick, which was adapted into the 1929 film Alibi, The Sap from Syracuse, which was made into a 1930 film of the same name, and wrote God Bless Us, Inc.

== Personal life and death ==
Wray was married to the former Florence Miller, and they had a son. He died of a stomach ailment on April 5, 1940, in St. Vincent's Hospital in Hollywood, California, aged 52.

== Partial filmography ==
- New York Nights (1929) - Joe Prividi
- All Quiet On The Western Front (1930) - Himmelstoss
- The Czar of Broadway (1930) - Morton Bradstreet
- Quick Millions (1931) - Kenneth Stone
- Silence (1931) - Harry Silvers
- Safe in Hell (1931) - Egan
- The Woman from Monte Carlo (1932) - Cmdr. Brambourg
- High Pressure (1932) - Jimmy Moore
- The Miracle Man (1932) - The Frog
- The Mouthpiece (1932) - Mr. Barton
- The Rich Are Always with Us (1932) - Clark Davis
- Miss Pinkerton (1932) - Hugo
- Doctor X (1932) - Dr. Haines
- I Am a Fugitive from a Chain Gang (1932) - Nordine (uncredited)
- The Death Kiss (1932) - Detective Lieut. Sheehan
- Central Park (1932) - Robert Smiley
- The Match King (1932) - Foreman of Janitors
- After Tonight (1933) - Mitika, the Gypsy Contact
- Lone Cowboy (1933) - Bill O'Neal
- Bombay Mail (1934) - Giovanni Martini
- The Big Shakedown (1934) - Higgins
- The Crosby Case (1934) - Giovanni Martini
- The Most Precious Thing in Life (1934) - Carter
- The Love Captive (1934) - Jules Glass
- Green Eyes (1934) - Inspector Crofton
- The Defense Rests (1934) - Michael Cooney
- Fifteen Wives (1934) - Jason Getty
- The Cat's-Paw (1934) - Man on Street (uncredited)
- Embarrassing Moments (1934) - Slug
- The Captain Hates the Sea (1934) - Mr. Jeddock
- I'll Fix It (1934) - Fletcher
- I Am a Thief (1934) - Antonio Porricci
- The Whole Town's Talking (1935) - Henchman Harry (uncredited)
- The Great Hotel Murder (1935) - Feets Moore
- Stranded (1935) - Mike Gibbons
- Men Without Names (1935) - Sam 'Red' Hammond
- Atlantic Adventure (1935) - Mitts Coster
- Ladies Love Danger (1935) - Lieutenant Roberts
- Bad Boy (1935) - Fred Larkin
- Frisco Kid (1935) - The Weasel
- Mr. Deeds Goes to Town (1936) - Farmer
- Poor Little Rich Girl (1936) - Flagin
- A Son Comes Home (1936) - Gas Station Owner
- Sworn Enemy (1936) - Lang, a Gangster
- The Devil Is a Sissy (1936) - Priest (uncredited)
- The President's Mystery (1936) - Shane
- Valiant Is the Word for Carrie (1936) - George Darnley
- A Man Betrayed (1936) - Sparks
- We Who Are About to Die (1937) - Jerry Daley
- You Only Live Once (1937) - Warden Wheeler
- Outcast (1937) - Hank Simmerson
- Circus Girl (1937) - Roebling
- The Devil Is Driving (1937) - Joe Peters
- On Such a Night (1937) - Guard Rumann
- The Women Men Marry (1937) - Brother Nameless
- The Black Doll (1938) - Walling
- Making the Headlines (1938) - Herbert Sandford
- Gangs of New York (1938) - Maddock
- Reformatory (1938) - Guard (uncredited)
- Professor Beware (1938) - Head Lawyer (uncredited)
- Tenth Avenue Kid (1938) - Joe Turner
- Spawn of the North (1938) - Dr. Sparks
- Boys Town (1938) - Weasel (uncredited)
- Crime Takes a Holiday (1938) - Howell
- A Man to Remember (1938) - Tom Johnson
- Pacific Liner (1939) - Metcalfe
- Risky Business (1939) - Silas
- Almost a Gentleman (1939) - 'Crack' Williams
- Each Dawn I Die (1939) - Pete Kassock
- Winter Carnival (1939) - Poultry Truck Driver (uncredited)
- Smuggled Cargo (1939) - Chris Hays
- Golden Boy (1939) - Chocolate Drop's Manager (uncredited)
- Blackmail (1939) - Diggs
- The Cat and the Canary (1939) - Hendricks
- The Amazing Mr. Williams (1939) - Stanley
- Gone with the Wind (1939) - prison gang overseer (uncredited)
- Remember the Night (1940) - Hank
- Swiss Family Robinson (1940) - Ramsey
- The Man from Dakota (1940) - Mr. Carpenter
- Outside the Three-Mile Limit (1940) - Ship's Captain (uncredited)
- The Doctor Takes a Wife (1940) - Joe - Farmer (uncredited) (final film role)
