= Jean Dixon =

American actress (1893–1981)

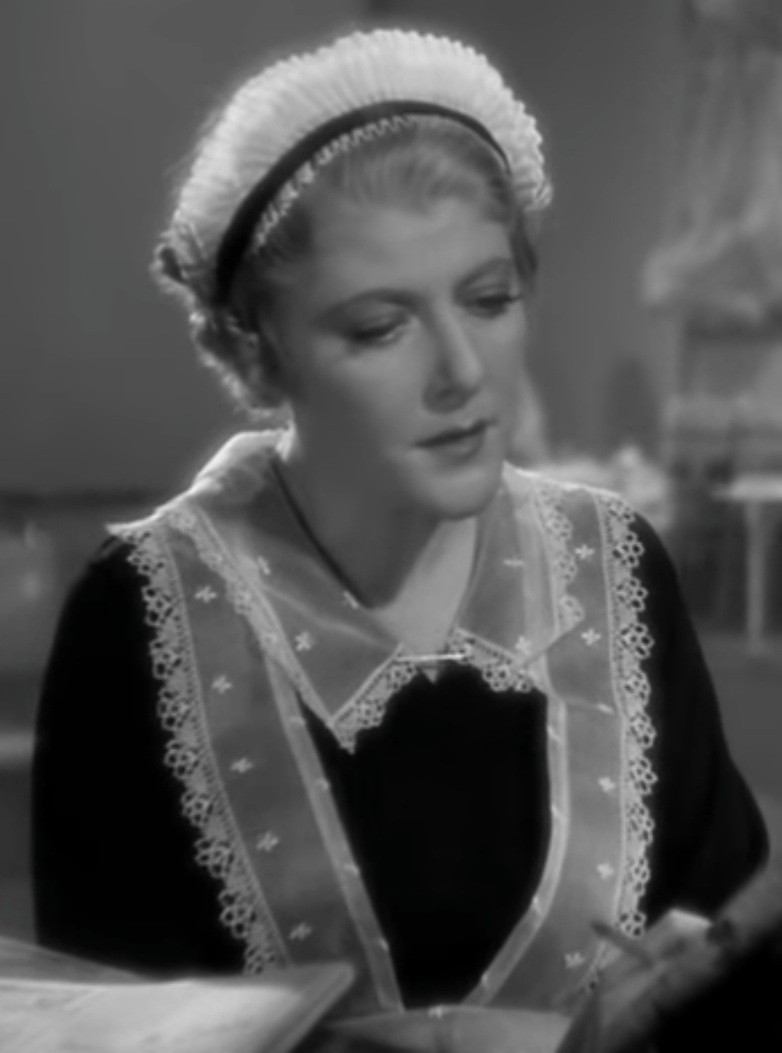
- Dixon in My Man Godfrey (1936)
- Born: Jean Jacques; July 14, 1893; Waterbury, Connecticut, U.S.
- Died: February 12, 1981 (aged 87); New York City, U.S.
- Occupation: Actress
- Years active: 1929–1960
- Spouse: Edward Stevenson Ely (m. 1936; died 1980)

Jean Dixon (born Jean Jacques; July 14, 1893 – February 12, 1981) was an American stage and film actress.

== Early years ==
Dixon was born in Waterbury, Connecticut. She attended St. Margaret's School in Waterbury, and was also educated in France, where she studied dramatics under Sarah Bernhardt.

== Career ==
She made her Broadway stage debut in 1926, in a comedy melodrama called Wooden Kimono, and continued to perform there even after she retired from films. Her style of "brittle comedy" was seen in plays like June Moon (1929) by George S. Kaufman and Ring Lardner and Once in a Lifetime (1930) by Kaufman and Moss Hart. Her final Broadway performance was in the play The Gang's All Here in 1959-60.

Dixon made her screen debut in 1929 in The Lady Lies and appeared in 11 other films, including My Man Godfrey, before her final studio film, Holiday (1938), which starred Edward Everett Horton, Cary Grant and Katharine Hepburn. She continued to act on stage throughout the 1940s and 1950s and made some appearances in TV series and TV movies in the 1950s and in 1960.

== Personal life ==
In January 1936, Dixon eloped with Edward Stevenson Ely; they were married in Yuma, Arizona.

== Selected filmography ==
Year	Film	Role	Director	Notes
1929	The Lady Lies		Hobart Henley	
1933	The Kiss Before the Mirror		James Whale	
1934	Sadie McKee		Clarence Brown	
1935	Mister Dynamite		Alan Crosland	
1935	She Married Her Boss		Gregory La Cava	
1936	My Man Godfrey	Molly	Gregory La Cava	
1936	To Mary With Love		John Cromwell	
1936	The Magnificent Brute		John G. Blystone	
1937	You Only Live Once		Fritz Lang	
1937	Swing High, Swing Low		Mitchell Leisen	
1938	Joy of Living		Tay Garnett	
1938	Holiday	Susan Potter	George Cukor	
