= The Death Kiss =

1933 film

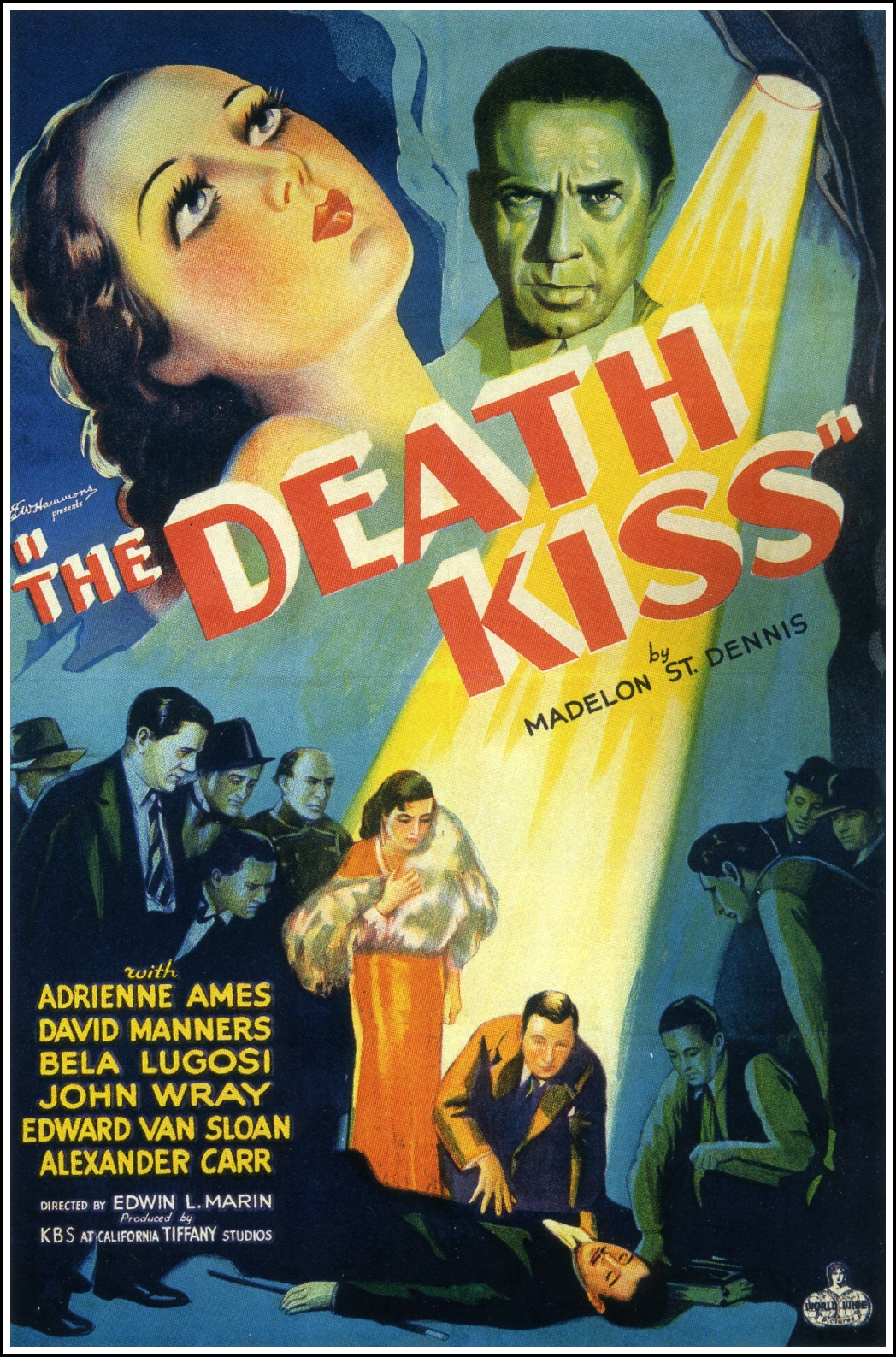
- Theatrical release poster
- Directed by: Edwin L. Marin
- Written by: Gordon Kahn; Barry Barringer
- Based on: The Death Kiss; 1932 novel by Madelon St. Dennis
- Produced by: E. W. Hammons, Burt Kelly
- Starring: David Manners; Adrienne Ames; Bela Lugosi; John Wray; Vince Barnett; Edward Van Sloan
- Cinematography: Norbert Brodine
- Edited by: Rose Loewinger
- Production company: Sono Art-World Wide Pictures
- Distributed by: Sono Art-World Wide Pictures
- Release date: January 8, 1933
- Running time: 75 minutes
- Country: United States
- Language: English

The Death Kiss is a 1933 American pre-Code mystery film starring David Manners as a crusading studio writer, Adrienne Ames as an actress, and Bela Lugosi as a studio manager. The thriller features three leading players from the previous year's Dracula (Lugosi, Manners, and Edward Van Sloan), and was the first film directed by Edwin L. Marin.

The film was produced by KBS Productions at Tiffany Pictures and released by Sono Art-World Wide Pictures. The film's main plot devices was reused for the 1946 French film That's Not the Way to Die starring Erich von Stroheim. The film is currently in the public domain.

== Plot ==
During the filming of a death scene of The Death Kiss, leading man Myles Brent is really shot and killed. Tonart Studios manager Joseph Steiner is assigned to handle the situation. The studio wants to pass it off as a simple accident, but screenwriter Franklyn Drew digs a bullet out of a wall and tells Homicide Detective Lieutenant Sheehan that it is a .38 caliber, while the guns used in the film are all .45s.

Sheehan finds a letter in the dead man's pocket, in which Brent wrote to his lawyer that Marcia Lane, his co-star and ex-wife, would not sign a release as beneficiary of his $200,000 life insurance policy. Chalmers, an alcoholic extra with a self-admitted grudge against Brent for getting him fired as head gaffer (electrician), is spotted trying to dispose of a loaded .38, but Drew points out that the gun has not been fired.

Drew suggests they view the footage of the fatal scene for clues, but somebody knocks out the projectionist and burns the print using a cigarette with rouge on it. It is a special rouge normally used by only two women. One was away on location, making Lane the prime suspect. Before another print can be made, the negative is destroyed with acid.

While snooping around on the set, Drew finds a derringer mounted inside a lamp and electrically wired to be fired remotely, but he is knocked out and the gun taken. He goes to question Chalmers, but finds him dead beside a glass of poison and a written confession. However, Drew finds several clues that make him suspicious. Through more detective work, he discovers that the new battery of Lane's car is dry, and battery fluid is poisonous.

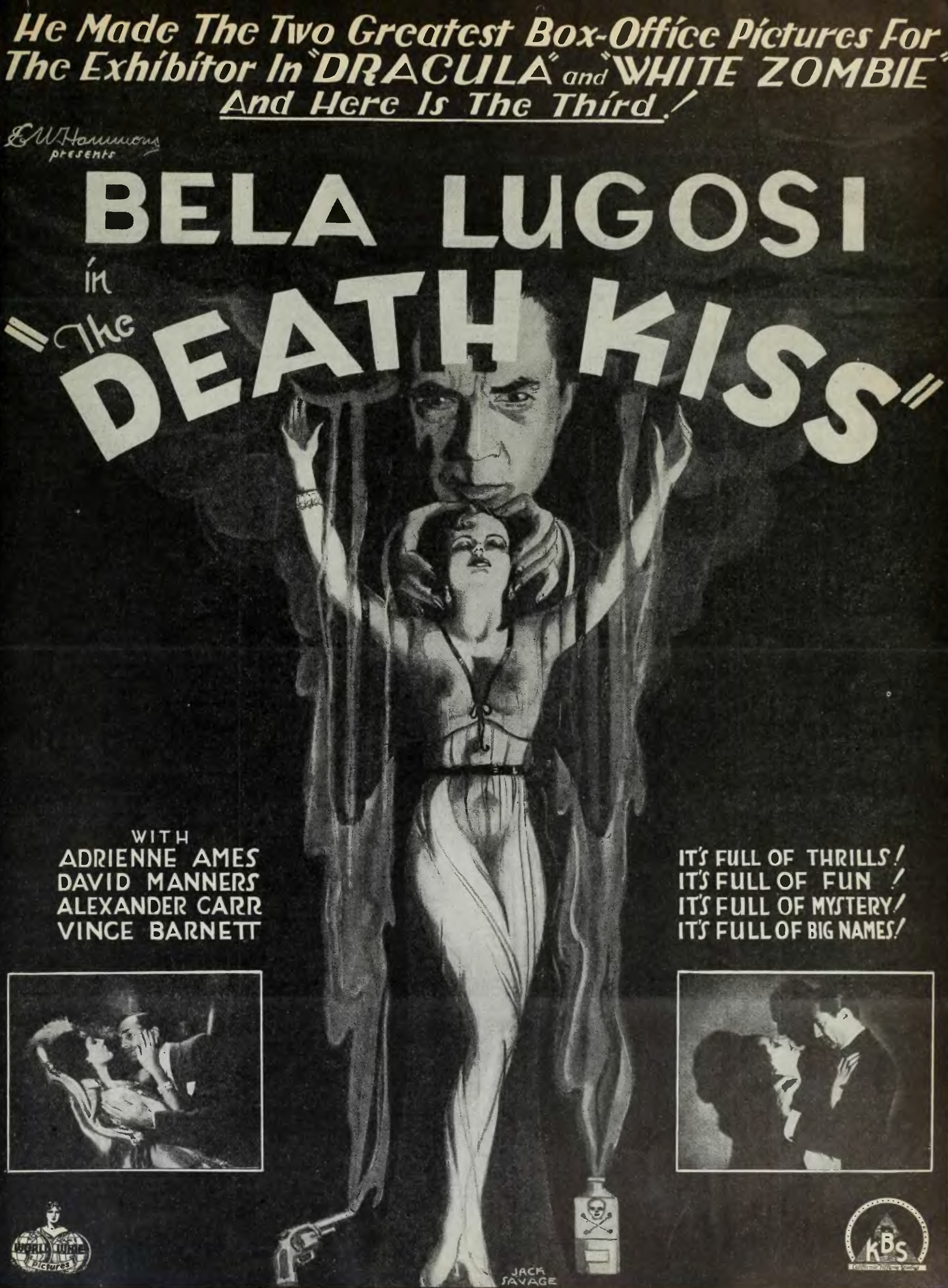
Death Kiss ad from The Film Daily, 1932

In Brent's dressing room, Drew finds a letter from a love-stricken married woman named "Agnes" and a hotel room key. Later, in Steiner's office, Sheehan takes Lane into custody; Drew spots a photo of a woman on the desk; the inscription reveals that Steiner's wife is named Agnes. When Drew goes to the hotel, he finds out from a bellhop that Brent had been there with a woman; her husband was waiting, and the two men got into a fight.

The studio decides to finish the film (only the last, fatal scene needs to be shot), using a double for Brent and arranging for Lane's temporary release. Drew finds out from the prop man that the guns were originally supposed to be .38s, but he made an unauthorized substitution. Drew takes him to Sheehan. Just as he is about to reveal who ordered the guns, the lights go out. (The murderer had overheard the conversation through a studio microphone.) After a gunfight and chase, the killer falls to his death. It is Avery, the director.

== Cast ==
- David Manners as Franklyn Drew
- Adrienne Ames as Marcia Lane
- Bela Lugosi as Joseph Steiner
- John Wray as Detective Lieut. Sheehan
- Vince Barnett as Officer Gulliver (chief of the studio police)
- Alexander Carr as Leon A. Grossmith ("president of this concern [studio]")
- Edward Van Sloan as Tom Avery (the director)
- Harold Minjir as Howell
- Barbara Bedford as Script Girl
- Al Hill as Assistant Director
- Harold Waldridge as Charlie (bellhop)
- Wade Boteler as Sergeant Hilliker
- Lee Moran as Todd (publicist)
- Edmund Burns as Miles Brent (uncredited)
- Mona Maris as Mrs. Agnes Avert (uncredited)
- Forrest Taylor as Actor (uncredited)
- George O'Hanlon as Bystander (uncredited)
- Lester Dorr as Hotel Desk Clerk (uncredited)

== Release ==
The Death Kiss was originally scheduled for a national release on December 25, 1932. However, the release was delayed by the addition of tinted sequences to the film, and The Death Kiss instead released on January 8, 1933. (Though technically, the scenes weren't tinted in the traditional sense, but by hand-coloring each frame as in the early method used by such pioneers as Georges Méliès.)

== See also ==
- List of early color feature films
- List of mystery films
