= Gigolette (1935 film) =

Film directed by Charles Lamont

- Theatrical poster for the film
- Directed by: Charles Lamont
- Written by: Gordon Kahn
- Produced by: Burt Kelly
- Starring: Adrienne Ames; Ralph Bellamy; Donald Cook; Robert Armstrong
- Cinematography: Joe Ruttenberg
- Edited by: William P. Thompson
- Music by: John Rochetti
- Production company: Select Productions
- Distributed by: RKO Radio Pictures
- Release date: February 15, 1935 (US)
- Running time: 68 minutes
- Country: United States
- Language: English

Gigolette is a 1935 American romance film directed by Charles Lamont from a screenplay and story by Gordon Kahn. The film stars Adrienne Ames, Ralph Bellamy, Donald Cook, and Robert Armstrong.

== Plot ==
Kay Parrish is the daughter of a former millionaire who lost everything in the stock market crash in 1929. She works as a waitress in a small country diner, where she meets Terrence Gallagher and Chuck Ahearn. Gallagher runs a speakeasy in New York City, where Ahearn works as his bouncer. Gallagher gives Kay his card, and tells him to look him up, but she scoffs at the idea. After they leave, Kay is told that her father has committed suicide. Determined to make something of her life, she travels to New York City to "make it big".

Once in New York, however, she is unable to find a job. Desperate, she looks up Gallagher, who hires her as a "gigolette", a young prostitute to entertain male clients at his club the "Hee Haw". Not in love with her work, and having a budding romantic interest between her and Gallagher, she repeatedly attempts to get him to open a "legit" club. He refuses, and during her work, Kay meets the wealthy Gregg Emerson, who she becomes romantically involved with. Shortly after, Gallagher is forced by the new liquor license laws, but he declares his intention to open up a new club.

Meanwhile, despite Kay being snubbed by his parents, Emerson declares his love for Kay and his intention to marry her. However, when Gallagher is in danger of losing his new club due to the extortion tactics of the gangster, Vanie Rourke, Kay gives Gallagher money to save the new club. The money was part of an engagement gift, and when he finds out, Emerson believes that Kay is in cahoots with Gallagher to defraud him. However, Gallagher is able to convince Emerson of Kay's fidelity, and the two are reunited.

== Cast ==
- Adrienne Ames as Kay Parrish
- Ralph Bellamy as Terrence Gallagher
- Donald Cook as Gregg Emerson
- Robert Armstrong as Chuck Ahearn
- Harold Waldridge as Ginsy
- Milton Douglas and Orchestra as themselves
- Ralph Looke
- Ernest Woods
- Dewey Robinson

(cast list as per AFI database)

== Production ==
In June 1934 it was announced that Select Productions had purchased the rights to the original story by Gordon Kahn, "Gigolette". It was the second of twelve scheduled productions for Select, a new production company which was filming pictures at the Biograph Studios in New York. Casting for the film was scheduled for the middle of July 1934, with filming to begin on the 30th of the month. On July 20 it was announced that Ralph Bellamy had been attached to the film's cast. On July 25, it was revealed that Charles Lamont had been signed to direct the film, and on the following day Robert Armstrong's participation in the picture was announced. By July 27, Adrienne Ames was added to the cast. The film did go into production at Biograph Studios on July 30, at which point it was also revealed that Donald Cook had a significant role in the picture. A portion of the film was shot on location in Riverdale, New York. During production WMCA did a live radio cast of the filming. Milton Douglas, who had appeared in several Broadway productions, along with his orchestra, was signed to perform as part of the nightclub entertainment in the film. By the end of August, photography on the picture was completed. In mid-January 1935, the deal where RKO agreed to distribute the picture for Select was announced. Gigolette was released nationally on February 15, 1935. The Chicago Legion of Decency graded the film a "B", meaning that it was "unsuitable for children and adolescents", but was "neither approved nor disproved for adults."

== Reception ==
Harrison's Reports gave the film a poor review. They felt the picture was "sordid," without any sympathetic characters. They felt the story was "trite," and called the picture only "moderately entertaining."
