= From Hell to Heaven =

1933 film

- Directed by: Erle C. Kenton
- Written by: Percy Heath; Sidney Buchman; Lawrence Hazard (play)
- Starring: Carole Lombard; Jack Oakie; Adrienne Ames; Sidney Blackmer
- Cinematography: Henry Sharp
- Production company: Paramount Pictures
- Release date: February 24, 1933
- Running time: 70 minutes
- Country: United States
- Language: English

From Hell to Heaven is a 1933 American pre-Code drama film. It was directed by Erle C. Kenton, and features an ensemble cast including Carole Lombard, Jack Oakie, Adrienne Ames and Sidney Blackmer. It was adapted from the stage play by Lawrence Hazard.

== Plot ==
A group of people from several walks of life gather to watch a horse race.

== Cast ==
- Carole Lombard as Colly Tanner
- Jack Oakie as Charlie Bayne
- Adrienne Ames as Joan Burt
- David Manners as Wesley Burt
- Sidney Blackmer as Cliff Billings
- Verna Hillie as Sonnie Lockwood
- James Eagles as Tommy Tucker
- Shirley Grey as Winnie Lloyd
- Bradley Page as Jack Ruby
- Walter Walker as Pop Lockwood
- Berton Churchill as Toledo Jones
- Cecil Cunningham as Mrs. Chadman
- Nydia Westman as Sue Wells

== Production and reception ==
From Hell to Heaven was Paramount's effort to replicate the success of Grand Hotel (1932), which had won the Academy Award for Best Picture for MGM the year before. Reviews were favorable; Mordaunt Hall of The New York Times wrote, "It is not as ambitious a picture as Grand Hotel, but it is interesting."
