= Ladies Love Danger =

1935 film by H. Bruce Humberstone

- Directed by: H. Bruce Humberstone
- Screenplay by: Samson Raphaelson; Robert Ellis; Helen Logan
- Produced by: Edward T. Lowe, Jr.
- Starring: Mona Barrie; Gilbert Roland; Donald Cook; Adrienne Ames; Hardie Albright; Herbert Mundin
- Cinematography: Daniel B. Clark
- Production company: Fox Film Corporation
- Distributed by: Fox Film Corporation
- Release date: May 3, 1935
- Running time: 69 minutes
- Country: United States
- Language: English

Ladies Love Danger is a 1935 American comedy mystery film directed by H. Bruce Humberstone and written by Samson Raphaelson, Robert Ellis and Helen Logan. The film stars Mona Barrie, Gilbert Roland, Donald Cook, Adrienne Ames, Hardie Albright and Herbert Mundin. The film was released on May 3, 1935, by Fox Film Corporation.

== Plot ==
Just before the final performance of a musical at a Manhattan theater, cast and crew members gossip about news headlines that the star, Adele Michel, is about to marry Argentine millionaire Jose "Gardenia" Lopez. Stage manager Tom Lennox, who is having an affair with Adele, threatens to tell Lopez about their tryst. Adele subsequently receives an anonymous letter from Helen, Lopez's daughter, accusing her of seeking the marriage solely for financial gain. Meanwhile, Lopez gets into an argument with his butler James, and later accuses a jeweler named Melvin of selling him an imitation pearl necklace for Adele.

When Lopez attempts to report Melvin to police by phone, and is answered by lieutenant Roberts. During the phone call, Roberts suddenly hears two gunshots before the call drops. When James returns to Lopez's apartment, he sees a woman standing in the doorway. The woman stumbles down the hall, claiming to be dizzy from a hangover. The woman tells Lopez's neighbor, Ricardo Alonzo, that she is searching for triplets she met on an ocean cruise the day before.

Lopez is found dead, and Roberts, a friend of Ricky's, attempts to solve the case. Rick questions the mysterious woman, who admits she entered the wrong building and found Lopez's corpse; to avoid becoming involved, she feigned being drunk. Though skeptical, Ricky teams up with the mysterious woman to solve Lopez's murder. The woman accompanies Ricky to a performance of Adele's show, and Ricky introduces her to the cast as Rita Witherspoon. Back at the apartment, Ricky and Rita encounter Phil Morton in the apartment. Ricky learns that Phil secretly married Helen six months ago, and had come to retrieve love letters he wrote her.

The next day, Ricky finds Rita has disappeared. Adele is subsequently found stabbed to death, and Rita reveals to Ricky she is actually a London journalist visiting New York for literary research. Tom phones Ricky asking to meet him immediately, and Ricky handcuffs Rita to his valet, Griffin's. Tom tells Ricky that he had visited Lopez's apartment to disclose his affair with Adele, but fled when he heard gunshots; he also implicates Melvin in the murder. Ricky disbelieves Lennox, who pulls a gun and flees.

At the theater, Ricky finds Phil searching for Helen, who is discovered bound and gagged in a closet. Phil brings Helen home, while Ricky discovers Tom's corpse asphyxiated in a nearby parked car. On the roof of the theater, Ricky discovers he can access his apartment building from there.

In Lopez's apartment, Ricky finds Rita snooping through paperwork. She reveals a hidden drawer showing a will that disinherits Helen. Phil appears with a gun, and confesses to killing Lopez over Helen's disinheritance, but he was spotted by Tom who informed Adele of what he witnessed. Phil attempted to blackmail Tom and kidnapped Helen, hoping to receive a ransom. He further confesses to murdering Adele and Tom. Before Phil can shoot Ricky and Rita, a struggle ensues and Ricky wrangles the gun from him. Rita flees the scene. Some time later, Ricky enters his apartment and finds Rita having drinks with the three triplets she met on the boat.

== Cast ==
- Mona Barrie as Rita Witherspoon
- Gilbert Roland as Ricardo Souchet aka Alonzo
- Donald Cook as Tom Lennox
- Adrienne Ames as Adele Michel
- Hardie Albright as Phil Morton
- Herbert Mundin as Giffins
- Dick Foran as Sergeant Bender
- Marion Clayton Anderson as Helen Lopez
- Ray Walker as Haskins
- Henry Kolker as Jose Lopez
- Russell Hicks as Melvin
- John Wray as Lieutenant Roberts
- Leonard Carey as James
- Fred Toones as Lewis
- Rita Rozelle as Conchita
