= Joy of Living =

1938 film by Tay Garnett

- Directed by: Tay Garnett
- Written by: Dorothy Fields; Herbert Fields
- Screenplay by: Gene Towne; Graham Baker; Allan Scott
- Produced by: Felix Young
- Starring: Irene Dunne; Douglas Fairbanks Jr.
- Cinematography: Joseph Walker
- Edited by: Jack Hively
- Music by: Frank Tours
- Distributed by: RKO Radio Pictures
- Release date: May 6, 1938
- Running time: 91 minutes
- Country: United States
- Language: English
- Budget: $1,086,000
- Box office: $1,337,000

Joy of Living is a 1938 American musical comedy film directed by Tay Garnett and starring Irene Dunne and Douglas Fairbanks Jr. with supporting performances from Alice Brady, Guy Kibbee, Jean Dixon, Eric Blore and Lucille Ball. It features the hit song "You Couldn't Be Cuter," written by Jerome Kern and Dorothy Fields.

== Plot ==
Margaret "Maggie" Garret is the star of a new musical show, Glamour, having come up the hard way, following the family tradition of stage performance. She now earns a large salary but is devastated to learn that she is deeply in debt. She has worked extremely hard to make the show a success, but spends huge sums on a palatial home, and supporting her parents Dennis and Minerva, her sister Salina (also her understudy) and Salina's work-shy husband, Bert Pine.

After the show one night, she forces her way through her adoring fans and is accosted by Dan Webster, who latches on to her and won't be put off. Taking him as a "masher", she drives to the police station, but Dan charmingly talks his way out of the charge. When it happens again, Dan is forced to appear in court and demands that Maggie appear as a witness. The judge finds the charge proved and sentences Dan to six months in prison. Maggie, who is slowly taking a liking to Dan's debonair manner, begs the Judge to commute the sentence to a suspended one. He agrees, but appoints Maggie the "probation officer", to whom Dan must report twice-weekly.

Dan, now revealed as an easy-going pleasure-seeker from a rich banking family, claims to own an island in the South Pacific, bought with family money. He continues to pursue the hard-working Maggie, attempting to convince her to take time off and have fun - as he does.

Eventually, they fall in love and marry. Dan wants to immediately board his boat and sail to his island, which he calls "Paradise", but Maggie has a show to do. She must make a choice.

Maggie returns to the family home and confronts her sponging family. She tells her parents, who have spent a fortune on acquiring antiques, to go into the antiques business. She tells her sister that this is her big chance - tonight she will take the stage and (perhaps) make her name.

Maggie and Dan sail off to Paradise.

== Cast ==
- Irene Dunne as Maggie Garret
- Douglas Fairbanks Jr. as Dan Brewster
- Alice Brady as Minerva Garret
- Guy Kibbee as Dennis Garret
- Lucille Ball as Salina Pine, Maggie's sister
- Frank Milan as Bert Pine, Salina's husband
- Dorothy Steiner (twin sister of Estelle Steiner) as twin sister Dotsy Pine
- Estelle Steiner (twin sister of Dorothy Steiner) as twin sister Betsy Pine
- Jean Dixon as Harrison
- Eric Blore as Potter
- Warren Hymer as Mike
- Billy Gilbert as Cafe Owner
- Phyllis Kennedy as Marie
- Franklin Pangborn as Orchestra Leader
- James Burke as Mac
- John Qualen as Oswego
- George Chandler as Taxi Cab Driver

== Reception ==
RKO recorded a loss of $314,000 on the film.
