= Guilty as Hell =

1932 film

- Theatrical release poster
- Directed by: Erle C. Kenton
- Screenplay by: Arthur Kober; Frank Partos
- Starring: Edmund Lowe; Victor McLaglen; Richard Arlen; Adrienne Ames; Henry Stephenson; Ralph Ince; Noel Francis
- Cinematography: Karl Struss
- Production company: Paramount Pictures
- Distributed by: Paramount Pictures
- Release date: August 5, 1932
- Running time: 80 minutes
- Country: United States
- Language: English

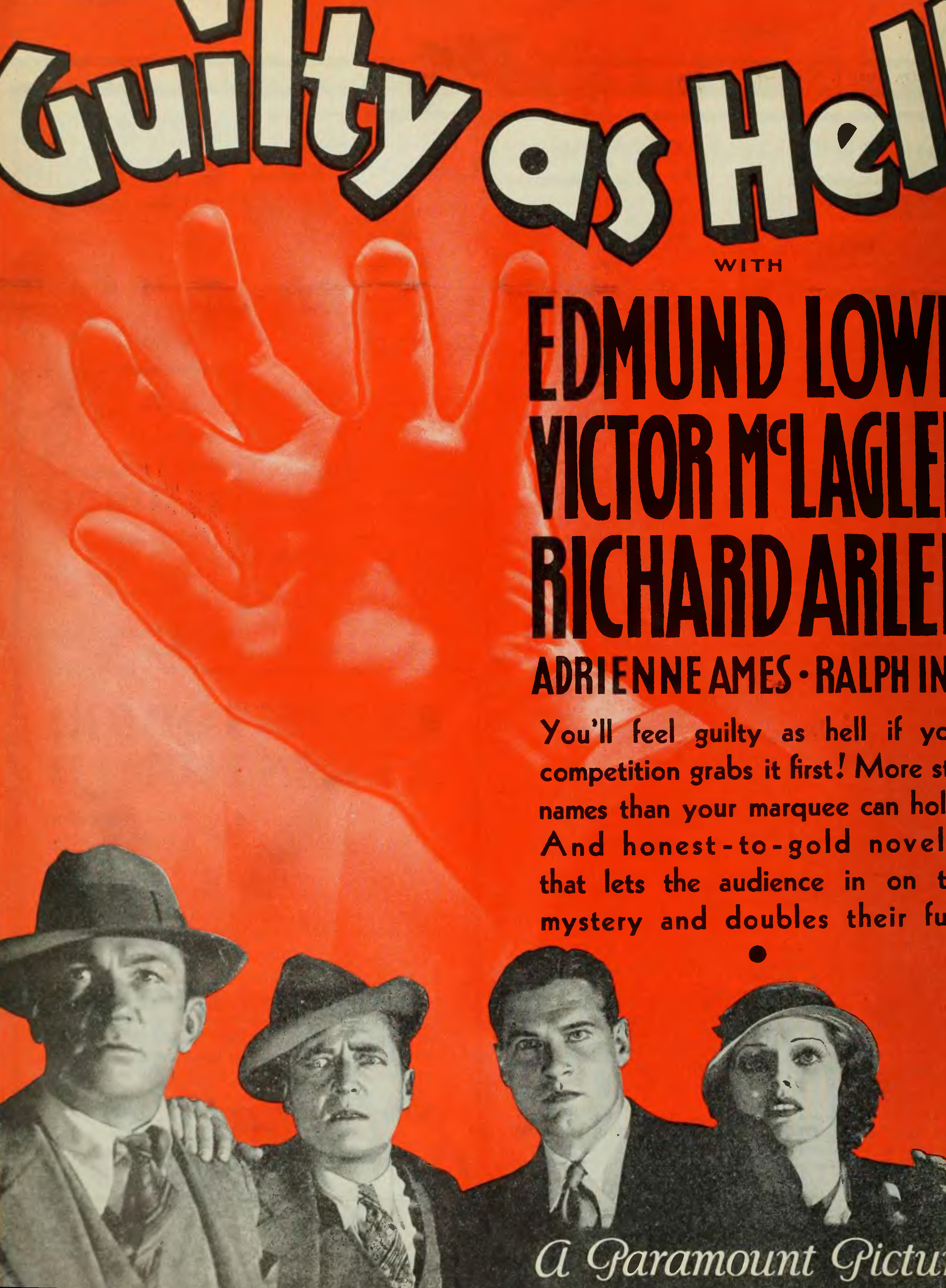
Guilty as Hell, 1932 ad in The Film Daily

Guilty as Hell is a 1932 American pre-Code mystery film directed by Erle C. Kenton and written by Arthur Kober and Frank Partos. The film stars Edmund Lowe, Victor McLaglen, Richard Arlen, Adrienne Ames, Henry Stephenson, Ralph Ince and Noel Francis. The film was released on August 5, 1932, by Paramount Pictures.

== Cast ==
- Edmund Lowe as Russell Kirk
- Victor McLaglen as Detective Capt. T.R. McKinley
- Richard Arlen as Frank C. Marsh
- Adrienne Ames as Vera Marsh
- Henry Stephenson as Dr. Ernest S. Tindal
- Ralph Ince as Jack Reed
- Noel Francis as Julia Reed
- Elizabeth Patterson as Elvira Ward
- Arnold Lucy as Dr. Sully
- Willard Robertson as Police Sgt. Alcock
- Richard Tucker as District Attorney
- Fred Kelsey as Detective Duffy
- Claire Dodd as Ruth Tindal
- Lillian Harmer as Mrs. Alvin
