= Jealousy (1934 film) =

1934 American drama film directed by Roy William Neill

- Directed by: Roy William Neill
- Written by: Argyle Campbell (play Spring 3100); Willard Mack (play Spring 3100); Kubec Glasmon; Joseph Moncure March
- Starring: Nancy Carroll; George Murphy; Donald Cook
- Cinematography: John Stumar
- Edited by: Ray Snyder
- Production company: Columbia Pictures
- Distributed by: Columbia Pictures
- Release date: November 23, 1934
- Running time: 66 minutes
- Country: United States
- Language: English

Jealousy is a 1934 American drama film directed by Roy William Neill and starring Nancy Carroll, George Murphy, Donald Cook and Raymond Walburn. The film was released on November 23, 1934, by Columbia Pictures.

== Plot summary ==
An insanely jealous boxer murders his manager when he finds him alone with his fiancee, but she is the one charged with the crime by the police.

== Cast ==
- Nancy Carroll as Josephine 'Jo' Douglas O'Roarke
- George Murphy as Larry O'Roarke
- Donald Cook as Mark Lambert
- Raymond Walburn as Phil
- Arthur Hohl as Mike Callahan
- Inez Courtney as Penny
- Robert Allen as Jim Rainey
- Clara Blandick as Mrs. Douglas
- Arthur Hoyt as Mr. Smith
- Josephine Whittell as Laura
