= The Woman I Stole =

1933 film by Irving Cummings

- Directed by: Irving Cummings
- Written by: Joseph Hergesheimer (novel); Jo Swerling
- Starring: Jack Holt; Fay Wray; Donald Cook
- Cinematography: Benjamin H. Kline
- Edited by: Gene Havlick
- Production company: Columbia Pictures
- Distributed by: Columbia Pictures
- Release date: June 30, 1933
- Running time: 70 minutes
- Country: United States
- Language: English

The Woman I Stole is a 1933 American pre-Code adventure film directed by Irving Cummings, starring Jack Holt, Fay Wray and Donald Cook. It is based on the novel Tampico by Joseph Hergesheimer, with the setting shifted from Mexico to North Africa.

== Main cast ==
- Jack Holt as Jim Bradler
- Fay Wray as Vida Carew
- Donald Cook as Corew
- Noah Beery Sr. as Gen. Rayon
- Raquel Torres as Teresita
- Edwin Maxwell as Lentz
- Charles A. Browne as Deleker

== Critical reception ==
A contemporary review in Variety described the film as "[f]actory product, but factory product of a successful kind," and noted that the film's [i]ntent is melodramatic, but the treatment is particularly smooth and innocent of overdone heroics without sacrifice of action" and that the "acting is engaging in its simplicity." Writing in The New York Times, movie critic Andre Sennwald described the film as "a melodrama of definite interest," "a beguiling adventure" with a narrative that is "told with color, speed and reticence," and having a conclusion in which "Fay Wray cool[s] her sinful heels on a distant pier while the two men who perilously avoided her net plan to celebrate their good fortune in a quart of brandy."

== Bibliography ==
- Roy Kinnard & Tony Crnkovich. The Films of Fay Wray. McFarland, 2013.
