= The Crosby Case =

1934 film by Edwin L. Marin

- Directed by: Edwin L. Marin
- Screenplay by: Warren B. Duff; Gordon Kahn
- Story by: Warren B. Duff; Gordon Kahn
- Produced by: Carl Laemmle, Jr.
- Starring: Wynne Gibson; Onslow Stevens; Richard "Skeets" Gallagher; Alan Dinehart; Warren Hymer; William Collier, Sr. John Wray
- Cinematography: Norbert Brodine
- Edited by: Robert Carlisle
- Production company: Universal Pictures
- Distributed by: Universal Pictures
- Release date: March 5, 1934
- Running time: 60 minutes
- Country: United States
- Language: English

The Crosby Case is a 1934 American pre-Code crime film directed by Edwin L. Marin and written by Warren B. Duff and Gordon Kahn. The film stars Wynne Gibson, Onslow Stevens, Richard "Skeets" Gallagher, Alan Dinehart, Warren Hymer, William Collier, Sr. and John Wray. The film was released on March 5, 1934, by Universal Pictures.

== Cast ==
- Wynne Gibson as Lynn Ashton
- Onslow Stevens as Francis Scott Graham
- Richard "Skeets" Gallagher as The Reporter - Miller
- Alan Dinehart as Inspector Thomas
- Warren Hymer as Sam Collins
- William Collier, Sr. as The Detective - Sgt. Melody
- John Wray as Willie McGuire
- Edward Van Sloan as Professor Franz Lubeck
- J. Farrell MacDonald as The Doorman - Mike Costello
- Barbara Weeks as Nora
- Paul Fix as Engineer
