= The Gold Ghost =

1934 film

- Directed by: Buster Keaton; Charles Lamont
- Written by: Ewart Adamson; Nicholas T. Barrows; Charles Lamont; Ernest Pagano
- Produced by: E. H. Allen; E. W. Hammons
- Starring: Buster Keaton
- Cinematography: Dwight Warren
- Production company: Educational Pictures
- Distributed by: Fox
- Release date: March 16, 1934
- Running time: 20 minutes
- Country: United States
- Language: English

The Gold Ghost is a 1934 short American pre-code comedy film starring Buster Keaton.

== Plot ==
Two wealthy fathers Jim and George try to arrange their children Gloria and Wally to marry in order to strengthen their families. Gloria refuses to marry Wally dubbing him "proof that reincarnation exists because no-one could be as dumb as him in one lifetime". Wally overhears this and storms off, deciding to leave his town altogether.

He ends up in Nevada, unbeknownst to him the town he settles on is in fact a literal ghost town. Discovering a discarded sheriff's badge he declares himself the sheriff. Wally goes into a saloon and meets a beautiful girl who turns out to be a ghost. When he sees that she is being pestered by the ghosts of several rowdy former townsfolk he scares them away with his pistol. He is soon joined by former gangster Bugs Kelly who has faked his death and ended up in the same town as Wally after going on the run.

Two local prospectors discover gold buried on the outskirts of the town and this leads to renewed interest in the town and results in dozens of people showing up to begin their own search for gold including Gloria and her father. A group of gangsters shows up and tries to intimidate Wally into handing the town over to them but he refuses. Bugs Kelly, convinced that Wally doesn't have the nerve to run the town takes Wally's badge and declares himself sheriff. However he soon gives the badge back to Wally after the gangsters target him for refusing to sell and Wally and Bugs unite to run the gangsters out of town.

== Cast ==
- Buster Keaton as Wally
- Warren Hymer as Bugs Kelly
- Dorothy Dix as Gloria
- Roger Moore (as Joe Young)
- William Worthington as Gloria's Father, Jim
- Lloyd Ingraham as Wally's Father, George
- Leo Willis
- Billy Engle as Short Miner (uncredited)
- Al Thompson as Miner (uncredited)

== Reception ==
Film critic W. Ward Marsh of the The Plain Dealer found the comedy "well pitched and propelled at a rapid rate," and applauded Keaton's return to short-form comedy, saying that "he should never have made feature length pictures."

== See also ==
- Buster Keaton filmography
