= Donald Cook (actor) =

American stage and film actor (1901–1961)

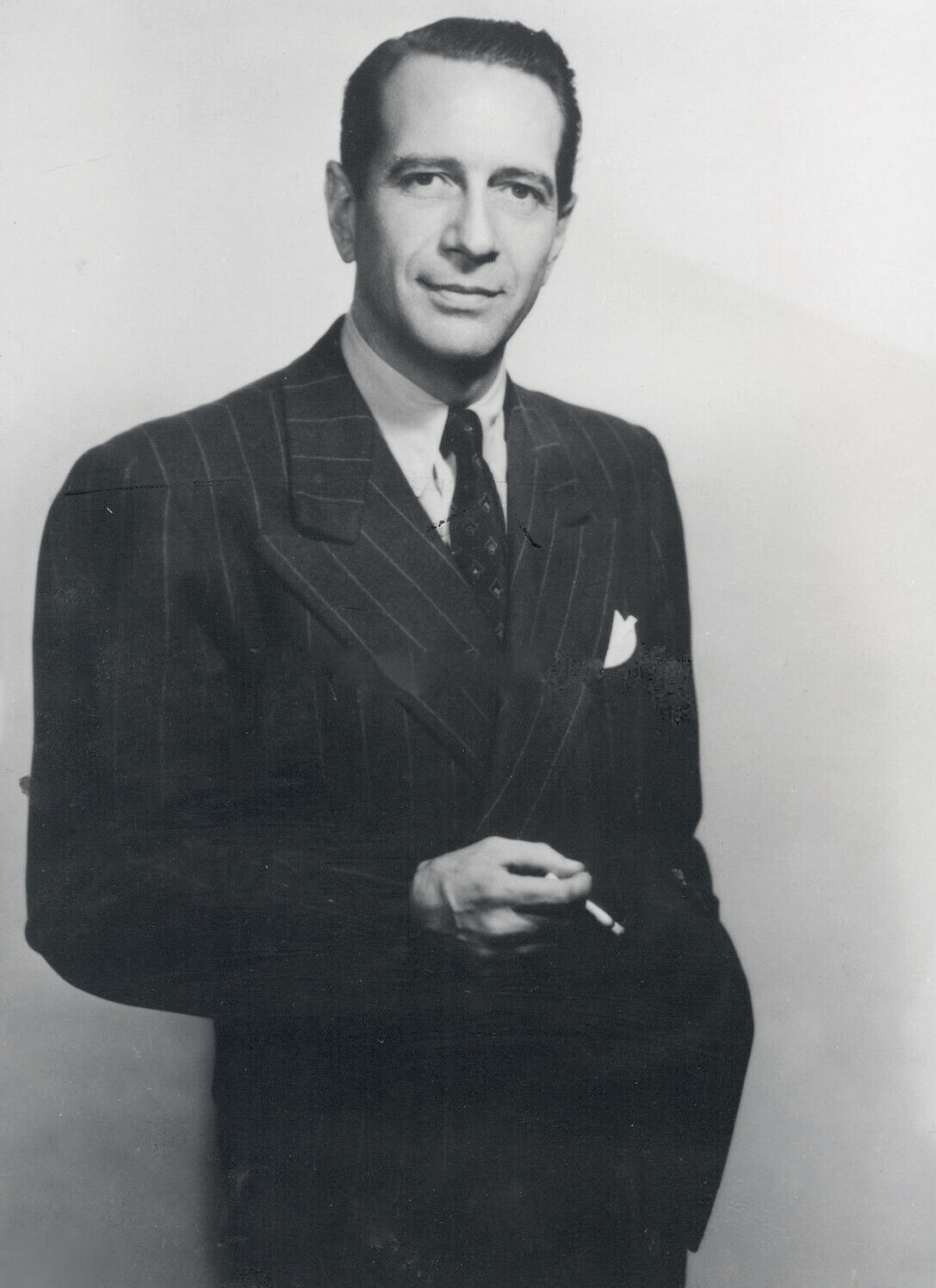
- Cook in a 1955 publicity photo
- Born: September 26, 1901; Portland, Oregon, U.S.
- Died: October 1, 1961 (aged 60); New Haven, Connecticut, U.S.
- Resting place: River View Cemetery, Portland, Oregon, U.S.
- Education: University of Oregon
- Occupation: Actor
- Years active: 1926–1959
- Spouses: Frances Beranger (m. 1930–1931) Princess Gioia Tasca di Cuto (m. 1937)
- Relatives: Ransom M. Cook (brother)

Donald Cook (September 26, 1901 – October 1, 1961) was an American stage and film actor who had a prolific career in pre-Code Hollywood films and on Broadway. Cook is perhaps best known for his film roles in The Public Enemy (1931), Safe in Hell (1931), Baby Face (1933), and Viva Villa! (1934), as well as for his stage role as David Naughton in Claudia, which ran for a total of 722 performances on Broadway between 1941 and 1943. He was the first actor to play Ellery Queen.

== Biography ==
Cook was born and raised in Portland, Oregon, and originally studied farming but later worked for a lumber company. Cook attended the University of Oregon. One of his elder brothers was Ransom M. Cook, president of Wells Fargo Bank. In 1930 he appeared in the Summer stock cast at the Elitch Theatre, in Denver, Colorado. He joined the Kansas Community Players and through this received an offer of stage work. He started screen work in "shorts" before going on to feature films.

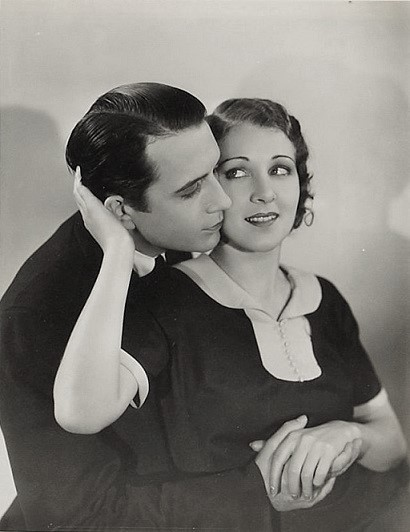
Donald Cook and Rita Flynn in The Public Enemy (1931)

Cook was known for his portrayal of Mike Powers in the film The Public Enemy. In 1935, Cook's starring role in the film The Spanish Cape Mystery made him the first actor in any medium to play fictional sleuth Ellery Queen. He played the role of Steve opposite Helen Morgan's Julie in the 1936 film adaptation of Show Boat, was one of the suspects in the Philo Vance mystery The Casino Murder Case, and starred as an heroic U.S. Immigrant Inspector of the Deporting Squad in the 1936 movie Ellis Island.

Cook made his Broadway debut in 1926 as Donn Cook in Seed of the Brute, and his New York theatrical career continued over the following three decades. His credits included a 1948 revival of Private Lives and the original 1951 Broadway run of The Moon Is Blue.

== Personal life ==
During his 1930 summer stock engagement at Elitch Theatre, Cook met and fell in love with Frances Beranger, another member of the company. “We were in love, and she urged me to go to Hollywood,” Cook said. “I did, and we were married when she returned to the coast from Denver.” The marriage lasted six months. However, “the prestige of my Elitch engagement helped me get my first Hollywood contract – with Warner Brothers.”

Cook was married to Princess Gioia Tasca di Cuto, from 1937 until his death in 1961 (although they were legally separated at the time) from a heart attack in New Haven, Connecticut, five days after his 60th birthday, in the midst of rehearsals for Cook's new play, A Shot in the Dark, an adaptation of L'Idiote. Walter Matthau took over Cook's leading role in the play following his death.

Cook is buried at River View Cemetery in Portland, Oregon.

For his contributions to the motion picture industry, Cook was honored with a Hollywood Walk of Fame star located at 1718 Vine Street.

== Filmography ==
Year	Title	Role	Notes
1931	Unfaithful	Terry Houston	
1931	The Public Enemy	Mike Powers	
1931	Party Husband	Horace Purcell	
1931	Smart Money	Nick's Second Accomplice	Uncredited
1931	Side Show	Joe Palmer	
1931	The Mad Genius	Fedor Ivanoff	
1931	Safe in Hell	Carl Bergen	
1932	Taxi!	Ferdinand	Uncredited
1932	The Man Who Played God	Harold Van Adam	
1932	The Heart of New York	Milton	
1932	The Trial of Vivienne Ware	John Sutherland	
1932	The Conquerors	Warren Lennox	
1932	Penguin Pool Murder	Philip Seymour	
1932	Frisco Jenny	Dan Reynolds	
1933	Private Jones	Lt. John Gregg	
1933	The Circus Queen Murder	The Great Sebastian	
1933	The Kiss Before the Mirror	Maria's Lover	
1933	Jennie Gerhardt	Lester Kane	
1933	The Woman I Stole	Corew	
1933	Baby Face	Stevens	
1933	Brief Moment	Franklin Deane	
1933	Fury of the Jungle	"Lucky" Allen	
1933	Fog	Wentworth Brown	
1933	The World Changes	Richard Nordholm	
1934	Long Lost Father	Bill Strong	
1934	The Ninth Guest	Jim Daley	
1934	Viva Villa!	Don Felipe de Castillo	
1934	Whirlpool	Bob Andrews	
1934	The Most Precious Thing in Life	Bob Kelsey	
1934	Jealousy	Mark Lambert	
1934	Fugitive Lady	Jack Howard	
1935	Behind the Evidence	Ward Cameron	
1935	The Night Is Young	Toni Berngruber	
1935	Gigolette	Gregg Emerson	
1935	The Casino Murder Case	Lynn Llewellyn	
1935	Motive for Revenge	Barry Webster	
1935	Murder in the Fleet	Lt. Cmdr. David Tucker	
1935	Here Comes the Band	Don Trevor	
1935	Ladies Love Danger	Tom Lennox	
1935	The Spanish Cape Mystery	Ellery Queen	
1935	Confidential	FBI Agent Dave Elliott	
1935	The Calling of Dan Matthews	Frank Blair	
1936	The Leavenworth Case	Dr. Truman Harwell	
1936	Ring Around the Moon	Ross Graham	
1936	The Girl from Mandalay	Kenneth Grainger	
1936	Show Boat	Steve Baker	
1936	Ellis Island	Gary Curtis	
1936	Can This Be Dixie?	Longstreet Butler	
1936	Beware of Ladies	George Martin	
1937	Two Wise Maids	Bruce Arnold	
1937	Circus Girl	Charles Jerome	
1944	Freedom Comes High	The Captain	Short film
1944	Murder in the Blue Room	Steve	
1944	Bowery to Broadway	Dennis Dugan	
1945	Here Come the Co-Eds	Dean Larry Benson	
1945	Patrick the Great	Pat Donahue Sr.	
1945	Blonde Ransom	Duke Randall	
1950	Our Very Own	Fred Macaulay	

Television

Year	Title	Role	Notes
1951	Prudential Family Playhouse	Tony Kenyon	1 episode
1952	Lux Video Theatre	Tad Bryson / Bruce Wallace / Roger	1 episode
1959	Too Young to Go Steady	Tom Blake	7 episodes, (final appearance)

== Stage credits ==
Broadway

- Seed of the Brute (1926)
- New York Exchange (1927)
- Spellbound (1927)
- Paris Bound (1927)
- Half Gods (1929)
- Rebound (1930)
- Wine of Choice (1938)
- American Landscape (1938)
- Skylark (1939)
- Claudia (1941)
- Foolish Notion (1945)
- Made in Heaven (1946)
- Portrait in Black (1947)
- Private Lives (1948)
- The Moon Is Blue (1951)
- King of Hearts (1954)
- Champagne Complex (1955)
- Goodbye Again (1956)
- Love Me Little (1958)
- Masquerade (1959)
