= The Czar of Broadway =

1930 film

- Swedish release poster
- Directed by: William James Craft
- Written by: Gene Towne
- Produced by: Carl Laemmle
- Starring: John Wray; Betty Compson; John Harron; Claud Allister
- Cinematography: Hal Mohr
- Edited by: Harry W. Lieb
- Music by: Heinz Roemheld
- Production company: Universal Pictures
- Distributed by: Universal Pictures
- Release date: May 25, 1930
- Running time: 79 minutes
- Country: United States
- Language: English

The Czar of Broadway is a 1930 American pre-Code crime film produced and distributed by Universal Pictures, directed by William James Craft and starring John Wray, Betty Compson, John Harron and Claud Allister.

== Plot ==
Jay Grant is a journalist who prioritizes friendship over his career, offering a critique of the journalism industry. Hired by a managing editor, Grant's assignment is to unveil the illicit activities of Morton Bradstreet, a powerful underworld figure who dominates a significant part of the city's nightlife and has considerable influence over the media. Adopting the disguise of an innocent countryman, Grant gets close to Bradstreet. However, when Bradstreet discovers Grant's true intentions, he orders one of his subordinates to eliminate him. Before this can happen, Bradstreet and his associate are taken down by a competing gang. Owing to their formed bond, Grant chooses not to publish a revealing article about the mobster, leading to his resignation.

== Cast ==
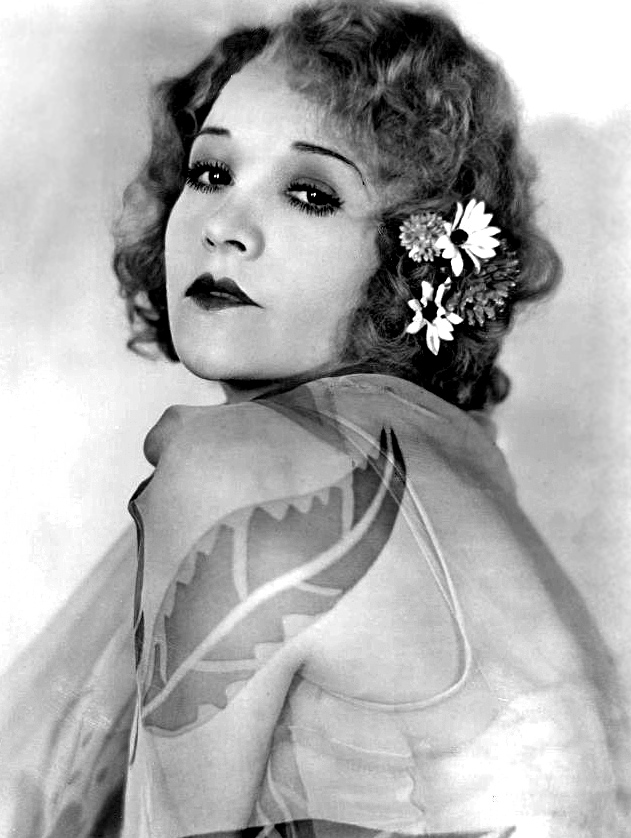
Betty Compson in The Czar of Broadway

- John Wray as Morton Bradstreet
- Betty Compson as Connie Cotton
- John Harron as Jay Grant the reporter
- Claud Allister as Francis
- Wilbur Mack as Harry Foster
- King Baggot a Dane Harper
- Edmund Breese as McNab
- Gino Corrado as El Dorado Club Headwaiter
- William B. Davidson as Club Manager

== Preservation status ==
This film is preserved in the collection of the Library of Congress.
