= To Mary – with Love =

1936 film by John Cromwell

- Theatrical release poster
- Directed by: John Cromwell
- Screenplay by: Richard Sherman; Howard Ellis Smith
- Produced by: Darryl F. Zanuck
- Starring: Warner Baxter; Myrna Loy; Ian Hunter; Claire Trevor; Jean Dixon; Pat Somerset
- Cinematography: Sidney Wagner
- Edited by: Ralph Dietrich
- Music by: Cyril J. Mockridge
- Production company: 20th Century Fox
- Distributed by: 20th Century Fox
- Release date: August 1, 1936
- Running time: 87 minutes
- Country: United States
- Language: English

To Mary – with Love is a 1936 American drama film directed by John Cromwell, written by Richard Sherman and Howard Ellis Smith, and starring Warner Baxter, Myrna Loy, Ian Hunter, Claire Trevor, Jean Dixon and Pat Somerset. The film was released on August 1, 1936, by 20th Century Fox.

== Plot ==
A husband and wife look back over the joys, sorrows, mistakes, merriment, tragedies, and triumphs of a ten-year marriage that started in the Roaring Twenties.

== Cast ==
- Warner Baxter as Jack Wallace
- Myrna Loy as Mary Wallace
- Ian Hunter as Bill Hallam
- Claire Trevor as Kitty Brant
- Jean Dixon as Irene
- Pat Somerset as Sloan Potter
- Helen Brown as Switchboard Nurse
- Wedgwood Nowell as Doctor
- Harold Foshay as Doctor
- Paul Hurst as Drunk
- Franklin Pangborn as Guest
- Tyler Brooke as Guest
- Arthur Aylesworth as Bartender
- Florence Lake as Salesgirl
- Edward Cooper as Butler
- Margaret Fielding as Nurse
- Ruth Clifford as Nurse
- Louise Lorimer as Nurse
- Jean Houghton as Nurse
- Margaret Brayton as Nurse
- Edwin Maxwell as Byron C. Wakefield
- Grace Goodall as Customer
- Beth Hazelton as Cashier
- Eddie Dunn as Politician
- Tom McGuire as Politician
- Tom Ricketts as Waiter
- Tammany Young as Thug
- Niles Welch as Secretary
- Richard Powell as Customs Officer
- Frank O'Connor as Conductor
- Virginia Paxton as Guest at Wedding
- William Cromwell as Interne
- Eric Wilton as Footman
- Jay Eaton as Guest
- Phyllis Barry as Guest
- Evelyn Barlow as Guest
- Geneva Sawyer as Guest
- Paul McVey as Guest
- Richard Barbee as Guest
- Howard Hickman as Guest
- Frances Paxton as Girl
- Carlyle Blackwell Jr. as Boy
- Daisy Bufford as Maid
- Matt McHugh as Taxi Driver
- Irving Bacon as Chauffeur
- Mario Dominici as Hotel Manager
- Jean De Briac as Clerk
- Larry Wheat as Minor Role
- James Cane as Minor Role
