= Man Wanted (1932 film) =

1932 film

- Spanish theatrical release poster
- Directed by: William Dieterle
- Written by: Robert Lord (story); Charles Kenyon (adaptation)
- Produced by: Hal B. Wallis (uncredited)
- Starring: Kay Francis; David Manners
- Cinematography: Gregg Toland
- Edited by: James Gibbon
- Music by: Bernhard Kaun
- Production company: Warner Bros. Pictures
- Distributed by: Warner Bros. Pictures
- Release date: April 23, 1932
- Running time: 63 minutes
- Country: United States
- Language: English

Man Wanted is a 1932 American pre-Code romance film directed by William Dieterle and starring Kay Francis as a married magazine editor who hires a handsome secretary, David Manners. The film features Una Merkel and Andy Devine in supporting roles.

== Plot ==
Lois Ames is the editor of 400 Magazine, whose wealthy husband, Fred, pays her little attention. His interests are polo and partying. When her personal secretary can no longer take the long hours of work and quits, Lois hires Tom Sherman, a handsome man who happens to come by the office to demonstrate a rowing machine, as her new secretary.

Tom soon makes himself indispensable to Lois, and their long hours spent together leads them to fall in love with each other. Tom's fiancée, Ruth Holman, senses something is going on and isn't happy about it. Tom's roommate, Andy Doyle, uses Tom's absences and Ruth's distress to try to romance Ruth himself. Meanwhile, Lois's husband, Fred, is having an affair with Anna Le Maire. Lois finds out when she discovers a key to Anna's room in Fred's vest pocket, which she puts on Fred's pillow; nothing is said between them, but Fred now knows that Lois knows about his infidelity.

After things go too far between Tom and Lois, Tom quits and begins to plan a wedding with Ruth. Lois tries to smooth things over with Fred, but instead they agree on an amicable divorce. On Tom's last day of work, Lois keeps him busy until very late, and he misses a dinner engagement with Ruth and Andy. Ruth storms into the office, with Andy in tow, and threatens to tell Fred about the affair. Lois tells everyone about the divorce, Ruth breaks her engagement with Tom and threatens to marry Andy in revenge, and Lois and Tom flirt with one another before kissing.

== Cast ==
- Kay Francis as Lois Ames
- David Manners as Thomas Sherman
- Una Merkel as Ruth Holman
- Andy Devine as Andy Doyle
- Kenneth Thomson as Fred Ames
- Claire Dodd as Ann Le Maire
- Elizabeth Patterson as Miss Harper
- Edward Van Sloan as Mr. Walters
- Frank Coghlan, Jr. as youngster in store

Cast notes:

- Man Wanted was the first film that Kay Francis made for Warner Bros., beginning her contract run with the studio.

== Production ==
Man Wanted had several working titles before it was released: "A Dangerous Brunette", "Working Wives" and "Pleasure First". The film was produced before the advent of the Production Code, and its themes of adultery would never have survived Joseph I. Breen's blue pencil.

== Reception ==
Eileen Jones of Jacobin described the film as "strikingly forward-thinking".
