= You Only Live Once (1937 film) =

1937 film by Fritz Lang

- Directed by: Fritz Lang
- Screenplay by: Gene Towne; Charles Graham Baker
- Produced by: Walter Wanger
- Starring: Sylvia Sidney; Henry Fonda; Barton MacLane; Jean Dixon; William Gargan; Chic Sale
- Cinematography: Leon Shamroy
- Edited by: Daniel Mandell
- Music by: Alfred Newman
- Production companies: Walter Wanger Productions, Inc.
- Distributed by: United Artists
- Release date: January 29, 1937
- Running time: 85–86 minutes
- Country: United States
- Language: English
- Budget: $628,138
- Box office: $589,503

You Only Live Once is a 1937 American crime drama film directed by Fritz Lang and starring Sylvia Sidney and Henry Fonda. Considered a precursor film noir, it was the second film directed by Lang in the United States. At least 15 minutes were trimmed from the original 100-minute version of the film due to its then unprecedented violence. Despite this, the film is widely considered an early film noir classic. It is also known for being one of the first box-office bombs.

== Plot ==
Eddie Taylor is an ex-convict who feels he is reformed and deserves a break, but he has doubts that he will get one. Initially, his doubts seem unfounded as his life goes well; he is married to Joan (the woman who waited for him and who has always believed in him), her boss (Stephen the public defender) has helped him to get a steady job, and he has the wherewithal to buy a house with Joan.

But this new life starts to fall apart, when he is summarily fired because he doesn't start work on time after the inn booked for their wedding night recognizes his picture and kicks him out. Eddie's old gang tempt him with an offer to join them in bank robberies, but he chooses to search for legitimate work instead. When a bank job occurs during which six people are killed, Eddie is framed and subsequently wrongly convicted for the murders. He is sentenced to death by electrocution.

On the eve of his execution date, he escapes from the prison infirmary using a smuggled gun, just as the authorities issue a stay of execution. Eddie's conviction has been called into doubt, as the bank vehicle used in the getaway has been recovered from a lake and found to contain the stolen money and the body of the real murderer and bank robber. The prison chaplain, whom Eddie has always trusted, tries to convince him that the reprieve is real, but Eddie is too bitter and disillusioned to accept he is a free man. He kills the chaplain in his desperation to escape.

He and a now pregnant Joan go on the lam, hoping to make it across the border to Canada. They become infamous and are blamed for every crime in the areas they pass through. After the baby is born, Joan manages a meeting with Stephen and her sister Bonnie. The two have arranged for Joan to hop a boat to Havana with the baby and wait there while Stephen works to clear her name. She refuses to leave Eddie. They continue their run, but are ambushed by the police and killed. As he dies, Eddie hears the voice of the chaplain telling him he is free.

== Cast ==
- Sylvia Sidney as Joan "Jo" Graham
- Henry Fonda as Eddie Taylor
- Barton MacLane as Stephen Whitney
- Jean Dixon as Bonnie Graham
- William Gargan as Father Dolan
- Jerome Cowan as Dr. Hill
- Chic Sale as Ethan
- Margaret Hamilton as Hester
- Warren Hymer as Buggsy
- Guinn "Big Boy" Williams as Rogers
- John Wray as Warden Wheeler
- Walter De Palma as Monk Mendall
- Gonzalo Meroño as Richard Steward
- Jack Carson as a gas station attendant (uncredited)

== Reception ==
The film recorded a loss of $48,045.

== Legacy ==
=== Radio adaptation ===
You Only Live Once was presented on Philip Morris Playhouse on November 28, 1941, with Burgess Meredith.

=== Cultural impact ===
James Baldwin writes fondly about the film in The Devil Finds Work (1976), arguing Lang "never succeeded quite so brilliantly again".

François Truffaut wrote the film "is about destiny and fate", explaining: "You Only Live Once is about interlocking forces: everything may seem to be going well, but the truth is, everything is going badly."

The portrayal in the film of "The last romantic couple" inspired Godard in his 1965 film Pierrot le fou.

You Only Live Once is considered to be a predecessor to the 1967 film Bonnie and Clyde.
