= The Avenger (1933 film) =

1933 film

- Directed by: Edwin L. Marin
- Written by: John Goodwin (novel); Brown Holmes; Tristram Tupper
- Produced by: Trem Carr
- Starring: Ralph Forbes; Adrienne Ames; Arthur Vinton
- Cinematography: Sidney Hickox
- Production company: Trem Carr Pictures
- Distributed by: Monogram Pictures
- Release date: August 10, 1933
- Running time: 79 minutes
- Country: United States
- Language: English

The Avenger is a 1933 American drama film directed by Edwin L. Marin and starring Ralph Forbes, Adrienne Ames and Arthur Vinton.

== Plot ==
A former district attorney seeks vengeance against the gang who framed him leading to his disgrace.

== Cast ==
- Ralph Forbes as Norman Craig
- Adrienne Ames as Ruth Knowles
- Arthur Vinton as James Gordon
- Claude Gillingwater as Witt
- Charlotte Merriam as Sally
- J. Carrol Naish as Hanley
- Berton Churchill as Forster
- Murray Kinnell as Cormack
- Thomas E. Jackson as McCall
- Paul Fix as Vickers
- Leonard Carey as Talbot
- James Donlan as Durant
- Boothe Howard as Ames

== Bibliography ==
- Monaco, James. The Encyclopedia of Film. Perigee Books, 1991.
