= Lights of Old Santa Fe =

1944 film by Frank McDonald

- Original film poster
- Directed by: Frank McDonald
- Written by: Gordon Kahn; Bob Williams
- Produced by: Harry Grey
- Starring: Roy Rogers; Dale Evans; Trigger
- Cinematography: Reggie Lanning
- Edited by: Ralph Dixon
- Music by: Roy Rogers
- Production company: Republic Pictures
- Distributed by: Republic Pictures
- Release date: November 6, 1944 (United States)
- Running time: 78 minutes 56 minutes
- Country: United States
- Language: English

Lights of Old Santa Fe is a 1944 American Western Musical film directed by Frank McDonald with a screenplay by Gordon Kahn and Bob Williams. The film stars Roy Rogers and Dale Evans.

== Plot ==
A rodeo owner struggles to make her show a success. When her rodeo is sabotaged by a rival showman, Rogers brings the perpetrator to justice.

== Cast ==
- Roy Rogers as Roy Rogers, a western singer and rodeo man
- Dale Evans as Margie Brooks, the owner of Brooks International Rodeo
- George "Gabby" Hayes as Gabby Whittaker, manager of Margie's rodeo
- Tom Keene as Frank Madden, the owner of Madden Worldwide Shows, a rodeo
- Roy Barcroft as Ken Ferguson, Madden's henchman
- Arthur Loft as Bill Wetherbee, a rodeo promoter
- Claire Du Brey as Rosie McGurk, Margie's companion and housekeeper
- Lloyd Corrigan as Marty Maizely, a radio station owner
- Sam Flint as Sheriff
- Lucien Littlefield as the Judge
- Bob Nolan as Bob, a singer and rodeo man
- Sons of the Pioneers as musicians and rodeo men

== Soundtrack ==
- Amor

Written by Ricardo López Méndez, Gabriel Ruiz and Sunny Skylar
Performed by Dale Evans

- The Cowpoke Polka

Written by Tim Spencer
Performed by Roy Rogers, George 'Gabby' Hayes and the Sons of the Pioneers

- I'm A Happy Guy In My Levi Britches

Written by Tim Spencer
Performed by Roy Rogers and the Sons of the Pioneers

- Cowboy Jubilee

Written by Ken Carson
Performed by Roy Rogers and the Sons of the Pioneers

- The Nerve Of Some People

Written by Jack Elliott
Performed by Roy Rogers and Dale Evans

- Trigger Hasn't Got A Purty Figure

Written by Tim Spencer
Performed by Roy Rogers

- Lights of Old Santa Fe

Written by Jack Elliott
Performed by Roy Rogers, Dale Evans, George 'Gabby' Hayes and the Sons of the Pioneers

- Ride 'Em, Cowboy

Written by Tim Spencer and Roy Rogers
Performed by the Sons of the Pioneers
