= The Lady Lies =

1929 film

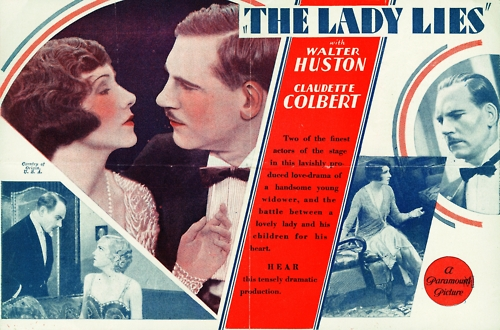
- Directed by: Hobart Henley
- Written by: Mort Blumenstock (titles); Garrett Fort (adaptation)
- Produced by: Walter Wanger
- Starring: Walter Huston; Claudette Colbert; Charles Ruggles; Tom Brown
- Cinematography: William O. Steiner
- Edited by: Helene Turner
- Production company: Paramount Pictures
- Distributed by: Paramount Pictures
- Release date: September 21, 1929
- Running time: 75 minutes
- Country: United States
- Language: English

The Lady Lies is a 1929 American Pre-Code drama film directed by Hobart Henley, and starring Walter Huston, Claudette Colbert, and Charles Ruggles. As was common during the early sound era, multiple-language versions were shot at the Joinville Studios in Paris for release in their respective markets, including a Swedish version titled The Two of Us.

== Plot ==
The film

Children of a widower who is having an affair with a salesgirl try to break it up, but are won over by the young woman.

== Cast ==
- Walter Huston as Robert Rossiter
- Claudette Colbert as Joyce Roamer
- Charles Ruggles as Charlie Tyler
- Tom Brown as Bob Rossiter
- Betty Garde as Hilda Pearson
- Jean Dixon as Ann Gardner
- Duncan Penwarden as Henry Tuttle
- Virginia True Boardman as Amelia Tuttle

== Filming locations ==
The Paramount Studios at 5555 Melrose Ave., Hollywood, Los Angeles, California.

== Censorship ==
When The Lady Lies was released, many states and cities in the United States had censor boards that could require cuts or other eliminations before the film could be shown. When the film exchange failed to notify Chicago theaters of cuts required by the Chicago Board of Censors, the theaters were forced to advertise the film as "pink" or adults only. In Pennsylvania, the censor board required the insertion of an intertitle stating that Charlie Tyler and Ann Gardner had gotten married prior to their going to their love nest.

== See also ==
- List of early sound feature films (1926–1929)
