= Jean d'Esme =

French writer and journalist (1894–1966)

- Born: Jean Marie Henri d'Esménard; 27 September 1894; Shanghai, China
- Died: 24 February 1966 (aged 71); Nice, France

Jean Marie Henri d'Esménard, known as Jean d'Esme (27 September 1894 – 24 February 1966) was a French writer and journalist.

== Biography ==
D'Esme was born in Shanghai, China in a noble French family originating from Provence. His father was a customs official in the Indochinese island Réunion. Jean studied in Paris in National School of Overseas France. After World War I, he turned to journalism and travelling, and started writing for magazines Je sais tout, Le Matin and L'Intransigeant. He travelled extensively in Central and East Africa, and wrote a series of articles about Ethiopia for L'Écho de Paris.

He published his first book, Thi-Bâ, fille d'Annam, in 1920, for which he was awarded Prix de Jouy by the Académie Française. D'Esme became known for his adventure novels, most notably Les Dieux Rouges, published in English as The Red Gods. He has also written numerous biographies, mostly of colonial military heroes, and a number of books for children.

In 1936, d'Esme produced the film La Grande Caravane in location of eastern Niger, about the journey of a caravan to the salt mines of Bilma. In the same year, during Spanish Civil War, d'Esme was imprisoned for filming in prohibited areas. In 1941, he directed the film Quatre de demain in Ramatuelle at the request of Vichy France.

From 1947 until his death, D'Esme was a member of the Académie des sciences d'outre-mer, and in 1955–1956, was a chairman of the Société des gens de lettres.
