= Mark Acklom =

English fraudster

- Born: Mark Richard George Acklom; 1973 (age 51–52); Lambeth, London, England
- Education: Eastbourne College
- Known for: Being a conman and fraudster
- Spouse: Maria Yolanda Ros Rodriguez
- Children: 2

Mark Richard George Acklom (born 1973) is an English conman and fraudster who was on Britain's National Crime Agency's list of 10 most-wanted fugitives. His criminal career began at the age of 16 and he has been imprisoned five times in Spain since 1999. He was wanted by Avon & Somerset Police on suspicion of fraud by false representation.

== Early life ==
Mark Acklom was born in Lambeth in London in 1973, the oldest of four children. He was educated at Eastbourne College. He was first jailed in 1991 when he was sentenced to four years in a young offender institution for stealing his father's American Express card and posing as a stockbroker to commit a £1 million fraud that included obtaining a £446,168 mortgage on a house and hiring private jets. He was described by the judge as "utterly selfish and completely ruthless". His parents, who informed the police of their son's activities, moved to rented accommodation and sold their house in Bromley to raise money to help pay off his debts. The events were the subject of an episode of Crime Limited in August 1993.

== Career ==
Acklom has been imprisoned five times in Spain. He was wanted by Avon & Somerset Police on suspicion of fraud by false representation after he started a romantic relationship with a woman in 2012, telling her he was Mark Conway, a rich Swiss banker and MI6 agent. The woman lent him a total of £850,000 which has never been repaid. His other aliases are alleged to include Marc Ros Rodriguez, George Kennedy and Zac Moss.

In May 2017, he was reported to have been seen and photographed in a café in Switzerland with a man who could be wanted fugitive Costas Estevez. Police seeking to detain Acklom under a European Arrest Warrant had previously been searching for him in Spain after he was released early from prison there before the warrant could be issued.

Acklom was on the National Crime Agency's list of 10 most-wanted fugitives. On 30 June 2018 Acklom was arrested at an apartment in Zürich and after extradition in 2019 was set to face trial later that year.

Acklom admitted fraud, relating to £850,000, acquired from a woman he targeted, at Bristol Crown Court in August 2019. He was sentenced to 5 years and 8 months and was the subject of a Sky documentary in 2019 – Conman: The Life and Crimes of Mark Acklom.

== Family ==
Acklom is married to Maria Yolanda Ros Rodriguez who uses the aliases Yolianda Ross, Maria Long and Mary Moss. The couple have two daughters.
