= Cecil Ryther Acklom =

Senior British officer in the Royal Navy

Captain Cecil Ryther Acklom CB CBE
- Born: 31 May 1872; Băuțar, Romania
- Died: 12 June 1937 (aged 65); Clontarf, Dublin, Ireland
- Burial place: London, England, UK
- Relatives: George Moreby Acklom (brother); David Manners (nephew)
- Military career
- Allegiance: United Kingdom
- Branch: Royal Navy
- Service years: 1885–1919
- Rank: Captain
- Conflicts: Vitu, First Expedition 1890
- Awards: CB CBE

Captain Cecil Ryther Acklom CB CBE (31 May 1872 – 12 June 1937), was a senior British officer in the Royal Navy, ‘a key figure in the development of the torpedo for over a decade’, Assistant Superintendent at the Royal Gun Factory, Woolwich (1899-1910) and Superintendent of the Royal Torpedo Factory in Greenock (1910–19).

== Life and career ==
Acklom was born on 31 May 1872, the son of Robert Evatt Acklom.

Acklom entered the Royal Navy in 1885 and in 1890 saw action in East Africa on the coast at Vitu where he was awarded a medal and clasp. Between 1901 and 1910 he played a key role in the development of the torpedo for the Royal Navy, and later became Assistant Superintendent at the Royal Gun Factory, Woolwich between 1899 and 1910 before becoming Superintendent of the Royal Naval Torpedo Factory, Greenock between 1910 and 1919. He was made CB in 1914, and CBE in 1919.

Acklom never married. He was the brother of George Moreby Acklom and the uncle of David Manners. He died on 12 June 1937.
