= David Manners =

Canadian-American actor (1900–1998)

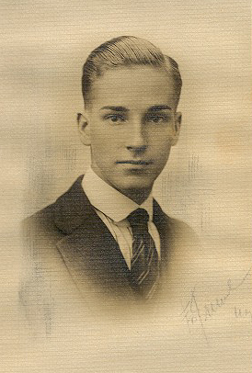
- David Manners in 1917
- Born: Rauff de Ryther Duan Acklom; April 30, 1900; Halifax, Nova Scotia, Canada
- Died: December 23, 1998 (aged 98); Santa Barbara, California, U.S.
- Occupation: Actor
- Years active: 1924–1953
- Spouse: Suzanne Bushnell (m. 1929; div. 1931)
- Partner: Frederic William "Bill" Mercer (1948–1978; Mercer's death)

David Joseph Manners (born Rauff de Ryther Duan Acklom; April 30, 1900 – December 23, 1998) was a Canadian-American actor who played John Harker in Tod Browning's 1931 horror classic Dracula, which starred Bela Lugosi in the title role. The following year, Manners portrayed the archaeologist Frank Whemple in The Mummy (1932), another pre-Code thriller by Universal Pictures.

== Early life ==
David Joseph Manners (originally Rauff De Ryther Duan Acklom) was born in Canada at 108 Tower Road in Halifax, Nova Scotia on April 30, 1900. He was the younger child and only son of British parents, writer George Moreby Acklom and Lilian (or Lillian) Manners, as well as being the nephew of Cecil Ryther Acklom, a senior officer in the United Kingdom's Royal Navy. He had an elder sister, Dorothea Cecily Acklom (later Mrs. Hall; 1898–1972). His father, in Halifax, was then the headmaster of Harrow House School, a prestigious private boarding school for boys. Eight years later, in 1907, Rauff, his mother, and his older sister left Canada and emigrated to the United States to join his father, who had emigrated during the previous year and secured a job as a literary advisor for E.P. Dutton, a publishing company in New York. By 1910 the entire Acklom family was living at 108 Hillside Avenue in Mount Vernon, New York, a northern suburb of New York City.

The Ackloms by January 1920 had relocated again, then to West 123rd Street in Manhattan, where 19-year-old Manners (still Rauff) continued to reside with his parents. He was employed as an assistant publisher and seemed destined to repeat his father's own career choice and live out his life as an editor and publisher. Soon, perhaps in an effort to chart an entirely different course for himself professionally, Manners stopped working as an assistant publisher and returned to Canada to study forestry at the University of Toronto. He found the curriculum there boring; however, he was attracted to stage work on campus. After receiving some drama training, he made his acting debut in 1924 at the school's Hart House Theater in Euripides' play Hippolytus.

Despite his father's objections, Manners continued to pursue an entertainment career when he came back to the United States. Before long he was performing in theaters in Chicago, on Broadway, and elsewhere after joining Basil Sydney's Touring Company and later Eva Le Gallienne's Civic Repertory Company in New York. During his time, before he moved to Hollywood at the beginning of the sound era in films, he obtained additional training under Le Gallienne, even though she had remarked that he was "a very bad actor" after seeing one of his performances. Manners in this period also appeared on the New York stage with Helen Hayes, with whom he co-starred in Edgar Selwyn and Edmund Goulding's play Dancing Mothers at the Booth Theatre.

== Hollywood career ==
After arriving in California, around 1927, Manners was serendipitously "discovered" by the movie director James Whale at a Hollywood party, and within a few years he was a popular leading man, playing opposite such actresses as Katharine Hepburn, Barbara Stanwyck, Gloria Stuart, Myrna Loy, Loretta Young, and Ann Dvorak. He was paired several times with Helen Chandler. After performing in an uncredited role in The Sky Hawk in 1929, he was featured the next year in Journey's End. Reviewers of the latter film, such as The New York Times and Variety, officially bestowed their endorsements on the fledgling movie actor's work. His subsequent performances were critically praised again in The New York Times and by other influential film critics.

In late 1930 Manners filmed his best remembered role, as Jonathan Harker opposite Bela Lugosi, in Universal's horror classic Dracula (1931). Until the end of his life, he continued to receive mail from fans of the movie, although he claimed to have never seen the finished film. In his tenth movie, he co-starred with Barbara Stanwyck in Frank Capra's critically acclaimed but commercially unsuccessful The Miracle Woman (1931). The New York Times lauded Manners again for his portrayal of a blind war veteran, stating that "Manners does exceptionally well with this sympathetic assignment".

During his brief tenure with Warner Bros., which had loaned him to other studios quite frequently, Manners progressed from being a supporting player to achieving true movie-star status following his role in Crooner in 1932. Shortly after that production's release, he began to freelance with much success. One of the final films he made before the end of his Warner Bros.' contract was RKO's A Bill of Divorcement, starring John Barrymore, Katharine Hepburn (in her film debut) and Billie Burke.

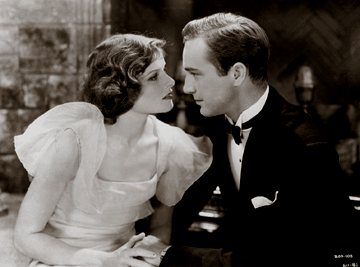
Publicity photograph of Katharine Hepburn and Manners in A Bill of Divorcement (1932)

After the success of Dracula, Manners worked for several years as a romantic leading man, and was most often seen in a tuxedo in romantic comedies and light dramas. The Last Flight (1931), a Lost Generation celebration of the high life in Paris, and Karl Freund's The Mummy (1932) with Boris Karloff were two standouts. But by 1936 he had grown bored with Hollywood, and abandoned his film career. He reportedly never acclimated to Hollywood, which he found to be "a false place". Although he was among the first group of actors to join the fledgling Screen Actors Guild in 1933, he returned to New York City, but he moved back to California three years later. Manners grew increasingly frustrated with his roles in Hollywood and with his film career in general, despite all its successes. Following his work on three films released in 1936—Hearts in Bondage, A Woman Rebels, and Lucky Fugitives—he left the studios and retired from film work. He did, however, continue to perform regularly on stage for another 17 years, appearing in various productions on tour, in summer stock, and on Broadway, including the ill-fated 1946 play Hidden Horizon. In 1953, Manners retired from acting entirely.

== Personal life and death ==
Manners married only once. In New York City, on May 23, 1929, he married Suzanne Bushnell, a native of Springfield, Ohio. A year later, according to the 1930 United States census, he and his 23-year-old wife were living together in Los Angeles in a $175-a-month rental property, along with Antonio Dumles, a 22-year-old Filipino who was listed as the couple's servant. David and Suzanne's marriage proved to be a brief one; they divorced in 1932.

In 1940, he officially changed his name to David Joseph Manners (Manners being his mother's maiden name), a change that is verified by its citation in the 1940 United States census. That same census also documents that he had applied to become a naturalised citizen of the United States. It further identifies Manners as an "Author/Actor" and that he was then living in Victorville, California, residing alone in a home, part of a ranch, that he had purchased several years earlier.

He became a published novelist in 1941 with Convenient Season; a second novel, Under Running Laughter, followed in 1943. (He used the name David J. Manners for his novels, both of which were published by E.P. Dutton.)

Manners was gay. In 1948, he met playwright Frederic William Mercer and the two lived together as partners for 30 years until Mercer's death in 1978. Initially, they lived together at Manners's ranch but left Victorville in 1956 to move to another residence in Pacific Palisades.

Following his retirement from acting, Manners spent the remaining decades of his life pursuing his personal interests, including painting, writing and studying philosophy. His reflections on philosophy were presented in Look Through: An Evidence of Self Discovery, published in 1971 by El Cariso Publications.

In 1998, 20 years after William Mercer's death, David Manners died at age 98 in the health centre of a retirement community in Santa Barbara, California. His body was cremated and the ashes were taken to San Bernardino County and scattered at Rancho Yucca Loma in Victor Valley.

== Filmography ==
- The Sky Hawk (1929) as Pilot (film debut, uncredited)
- Journey's End (1930) as 2nd Lt. Raleigh
- He Knew Women (1930) as Austin Lowe
- Sweet Mama (1930) as Jimmy
- Kismet (1930) as Caliph Abdallah
- The Truth About Youth (1930) as Richard Dane 'The Imp'
- Mothers Cry (1930) as Arthur 'Artie' Williams
- The Right to Love (1930) as Joe Copeland
- Dracula (1931) as John Harker
- The Millionaire (1931) as Bill Merrick
- The Miracle Woman (1931) as John Carson and
- The Last Flight (1931) as Shep Lambert
- The Ruling Voice (1931) as Dick Cheney
- The Greeks Had a Word for Them (1932) as Dey Emery
- Lady with a Past (1932) as Donnie Wainwright
- Beauty and the Boss (1932) as Baron Paul von Ullrich
- Man Wanted (1932) as Thomas Sherman
- Stranger in Town (1932) as Jerry Fleming
- Crooner (1932) as Ted 'Teddy' Taylor
- A Bill of Divorcement (1932) as Kit
- They Call It Sin (1932) as Jimmy Decker
- The Death Kiss (1932) as Franklyn Drew
- The Mummy (1932) as Frank Whemple
- From Hell to Heaven (1933) as Wesley Burt
- The Warrior's Husband (1933) as Theseus
- The Girl in 419 (1933) as Dr. Martin Nichols
- The Devil's in Love (1933) as Capt. Jean Fabien
- Torch Singer (1933) as Michael Gardner
- Roman Scandals (1933) as Josephus
- The Luck of a Sailor (1934) as Captain Colin
- The Black Cat (1934) as Peter Alison
- The Great Flirtation (1934) as Larry Kenyon
- The Moonstone (1934) as Franklin Blake
- The Mystery of Edwin Drood (1935) as Edwin Drood
- The Perfect Clue (1935) as David Mannering
- Jalna (1935) as Eden Whiteoak
- Hearts in Bondage (1936) as Raymond Jordan
- A Woman Rebels (1936) as Lieutenant Alan Craig Freeland
- Lucky Fugitives (1936) as Jack Wycoff/Cy King (final film)

== Bibliography ==
- Clive Hirschhorn. The Warner Bros. Story (New York: Crown Publishers, New York, 1979); ISBN 0-7064-0797-0
- Ephraim Katz. The Film Encyclopedia (New York: Harper Perennial, 1980); ISBN 0-06-074214-3
- David Morgan Jones. The Wonder Within You, Trafford Publishing (2006); ISBN 1-4120-5013-8
- McMurchy, D. (July 1999). "David Manners: A Perfect Gentleman". Classic Images. Vol. 289. Muscatine, Iowa. Archived from the original on August 24, 2000.
