= George White's Scandals (1934 film) =

1934 film by George White

- Theatrical release poster
- Directed by: George White
- Screenplay by: Jack Yellen
- Story by: George White; Robert Kane
- Produced by: George White
- Starring: Rudy Vallée; Jimmy Durante; Alice Faye; Adrienne Ames; Gregory Ratoff; Cliff Edwards; Dixie Dunbar
- Cinematography: Lee Garmes; George Schneiderman
- Edited by: Paul Weatherwax
- Music by: David Buttolph; Hugo Friedhofer
- Production company: Fox Film Corporation
- Distributed by: Fox Film Corporation
- Release date: March 16, 1934
- Running time: 80 minutes
- Country: United States
- Language: English

George White's Scandals is a 1934 American pre-Code musical film directed by George White and written by Jack Yellen. The film stars Rudy Vallée, Jimmy Durante, Alice Faye, Adrienne Ames, Gregory Ratoff, Cliff Edwards and Dixie Dunbar. The film was released on March 16, 1934, by Fox Film Corporation. George White also produced George White's Scandals for RKO in 1945. It was directed by Felix E. Feist and starred Joan Davis and Jack Haley.

== Cast ==
- Rudy Vallée as Jimmy Martin
- Jimmy Durante as Happy McGillicuddy
- Alice Faye as Kitty Donnelly / Mona Vale
- Adrienne Ames as Barbara Loraine
- Gregory Ratoff as Nicholas Mitwoch
- Cliff Edwards as Stew Hart
- Dixie Dunbar as Patsy Day
- George White as George White
- Gertrude Michael as Miss Lee
- Warren Hymer as Pete Pandos
- Thomas E. Jackson as Al Burke
- Armand Kaliz as Count Dekker
- Roger Gray as Sailor Brown
- William Bailey as Harold Bestry
- George Irving as John R. Loraine
- Edward LeSaint as Judge O'Neill
- Eunice Coleman as Wife in King Henry VIII sketch
- Martha Merrill as Wife in King Henry VIII sketch
- Lois Eckert as Wife in King Henry VIII sketch
- Hilda Knight as Wife in King Henry VIII sketch
- Peggy Moseley as Wife in King Henry VIII sketch
- Lucile Walker as Wife in King Henry VIII sketch
- Edna Mae Jones as Eleanor Sawyer
- Marie Ormiston as Jean Moriston
- Richard Alexander as Iceman
- Richard Carle as Minister

== Reception ==
The film was a box office disappointment for Fox.
