= The Lady from Texas =

1951 film by Joseph Pevney

- Film poster
- Directed by: Joseph Pevney
- Screenplay by: Gerald Drayson Adams; Connie Lee (as Connie Lee Bennett)
- Story by: Harold Shumate
- Produced by: Leonard Goldstein
- Starring: Howard Duff; Mona Freeman; Josephine Hull
- Cinematography: Charles P. Boyle
- Edited by: Virgil W. Vogel
- Color process: Technicolor
- Production company: Universal Pictures
- Distributed by: Universal Pictures
- Release date: September 1, 1951
- Running time: 78 minutes
- Country: United States
- Language: English

The Lady from Texas is a 1951 American comedy Western film directed by Joseph Pevney and starring Howard Duff, Mona Freeman and Josephine Hull.

== Plot ==
A ranch cook and a cowboy save a poor old Civil War widow from a land grabber in the Old West.

== Cast ==
- Howard Duff as Dan Mason
- Mona Freeman as Bonnie Lee
- Josephine Hull as Miss Birdie Wheeler
- Gene Lockhart as Judge George Jeffers
- Craig Stevens as Cyril Guthrie
- Jay C. Flippen as Sheriff Mike McShane
- Ed Begley as Dave Blodgett
- Morgan Farley as Lucian Haddon
- Chris-Pin Martin as José
- Barbara Knudson as Mabel Guthrie
- Kenneth Patterson as Craig Toland
- John Maxwell as Mr. Deevers

== Reception ==
In a contemporary review for The Philadelphia Inquirer, critic Mildred Martin called the film "a winning, warm-hearted comedy" and wrote: "A sort of sage brush fairy story, 'The Lady from Texas' has appeal without sogginess, humor and gentleness. Joseph Pevney's direction has the light, right touch and Howard Shumate's original has been deftly whipped into an ingratiating script by Gerald Drayson Adams and Connie Lee Bennett."

== See also ==
- List of American films of 1951
