= Judith Barrett =

American actress (1909–2000)

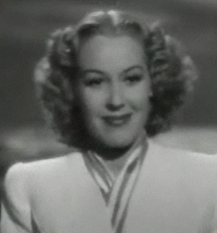
- in Road to Singapore (1940)
- Born: Lucille Kelley; February 2, 1909; Venus, Texas, U.S.
- Died: March 10, 2000 (aged 91); Palm Desert, California, U.S.
- Other name: Nancy Dover
- Occupation: Actress
- Years active: 1928–1940
- Spouses: Cliff Edwards (m. 1932; div. 1936) Lindsay C. Howard (m. 1940; div. 1952)

Judith Barrett (born Lucille Kelley, February 2, 1909 – March 10, 2000), also known as Nancy Dover, was an American film actress whose career spanned from the late 1920s until 1940.

== Early life ==
Born and raised in Venus, Texas, Barrett was one of three children of a cattle rancher Sam Kelley.

== Career ==
At 16, Barrett got on a train to Hollywood. Her first big chance came when she started in a lavish commercial film in 1928, The Sock Exchange opposite Bobby Vernon. In 1929, Barrett starred in five films, and made a successful transition to "talking films". From 1928 to 1933, she was billed as "Nancy Dover", and from 1930 to 1933, she appeared in nine films, all credited.

In 1933, Barrett appeared in only one film, Marriage Humor opposite Harry Langdon and Vernon Dent, while doing stage work. She did not have another role until 1936, when she starred in the crime drama Yellowstone opposite Henry Hunter and alongside Ralph Morgan and Alan Hale. It was the first film in which she was billed as "Judith Barrett". She appeared in two films that year, and five in 1937, one of which was her first uncredited role.

From 1938 to 1940, Barrett appeared in 10 films, all credited, including Road to Singapore, the first "road" picture by the team of Bing Crosby and Bob Hope. Barrett retired from film acting following her appearance in the 1940 comedy Those Were the Days!, starring William Holden and Bonita Granville.

=== Telegenic ===
Noted for her beauty, the October 16, 1939, edition of the Baltimore Sun said of her: "Judith Barrett, pretty and blonde actress, is the first Telegenic Girl to go on record. In other words, she is the perfect type of beauty for television. ... She is slated for the first television motion picture." The Salt Lake Tribune noted that Barrett was "selected after months of exhaustive tests by television experts, sound engineers, photographers, and make-up specialists." Paramount Pictures followed up on the selection by featuring her in its film, Television Spy (1939).

== Personal life ==
In March 1940, Barrett married Lindsay C. Howard in Yuma, Arizona. They divorced on April 8, 1952. She had earlier been married to actor Cliff Edwards.

She eventually settled in Palm Desert, California, where she was residing at the time of her death at the age of 91 on March 10, 2000. She had two children with Howard and the marriage ended in divorce.

== Filmography ==
Film
Year	Title	Role	Notes
1928	The Sock Exchange	June	First role credited as Nancy Dover
1929	Happy Heels		
1929	Scandal	Janet	
1929	Skirt Shy	Nancy, the maid	
1929	Dynamite	Good Mixer	
1929	Romance De Luxe		
1930	The Head Guy	Nancy	
1930	Oh Darling		
1930	The Fighting Parson	The Brunette Dance Hall Girl	
1930	The Big Kick	Harry's Girl	
1930	The Thoroughbred	Colleen Riley	
1931	Cimarron	Donna Cravat	
1931	Big Business Girl	Sarah Ellen	
1931	Hollywood Halfbacks	Kay	
1933	Marriage Humor		Last role credited as Nancy Dover
1936	Yellowstone	Ruth Foster	
1936	Flying Hostess	Helen Brooks	
1937	The Good Old Soak	Ina Heath	
1937	Let Them Live	Rita Johnson	
1937	Armored Car	Ella Logan	
1937	Vogues of 1938	Model	Uncredited
1937	Behind the Mike	Jane Arledge	
1938	Illegal Traffic	Marie Arden	
1939	Persons in Hiding	Blase Blonde	
1939	I'm from Missouri	Lola Pike	
1939	The Gracie Allen Murder Case	Dixie Del Marr	
1939	Television Spy	Gwen Lawson	
1939	Disputed Passage	Winifred Bane	
1939	The Great Victor Herbert	Marie Clark	
1940	Road to Singapore	Gloria Wycott	
1940	Women Without Names	Peggy Athens	
1940	Those Were the Days!	Mirabel Allstairs	Final film role
