= Let Them Live =

Film directed by Harold Young

- Theatrical release poster
- Directed by: Harold Young
- Screenplay by: Lionel Houser; Bruce Manning
- Story by: Richard Wormser
- Produced by: Edmund Grainger
- Starring: John Howard; Nan Grey; Edward Ellis; Judith Barrett; Robert Wilcox; Benny Bartlett
- Cinematography: James Van Trees
- Edited by: John Rawlins
- Production company: Universal Pictures
- Distributed by: Universal Pictures
- Release date: April 25, 1937
- Running time: 74 minutes
- Country: United States
- Language: English

Let Them Live is a 1937 American drama film directed by Harold Young and written by Lionel Houser and Bruce Manning. The film stars John Howard, Nan Grey, Edward Ellis, Judith Barrett, Robert Wilcox and Benny Bartlett. The film was released on April 25, 1937, by Universal Pictures.

== Cast ==
- John Howard as Dr. Paul Martin
- Nan Grey as Judith Marshall
- Edward Ellis as Pete Lindsey
- Judith Barrett as Rita Johnson
- Robert Wilcox as Dr. Donald Clipton
- Benny Bartlett as Mike
- Henry Kolker as Judge Lederer
- Robert Warwick as The Mayor
- William B. Davidson as The Editor
- Ralph Remley as Danny
