= Looking for Trouble (1934 film) =

1934 film by William A. Wellman

- Film poster
- Directed by: William A. Wellman
- Written by: Leonard Praskins; Elmer Harris; J. Robert Bren (story)
- Produced by: Darryl F. Zanuck
- Starring: Spencer Tracy; Jack Oakie; Constance Cummings
- Cinematography: James Van Trees
- Edited by: Hanson Fritch
- Music by: Alfred Newman
- Production company: Twentieth Century Pictures
- Distributed by: United Artists
- Release date: March 29, 1934
- Running time: 80 minutes
- Country: United States
- Language: English

Looking for Trouble is a 1934 American Pre-Code crime film directed by William A. Wellman and starring Spencer Tracy, Jack Oakie and Constance Cummings. After he is rejected by a woman, a man leaves his safe job and joins a gang that robs banks. The film, set in Los Angeles and Long Beach, California features actual stock footage from the 1933 Long Beach earthquake.

== Plot ==
A telephone line repairman named Joe Graham lives in Los Angeles. One night, he is offered a promotion, but declines, telling his boss that he is happy being a "trouble shooter" working out in the field, solving problems.

Later, Joe's coworker and partner, Dan Sutter, cannot work the night shift, so Joe has to work with a new repairman called Casey, who has an aptitude for practical jokes. Joe and Casey run into some odd things during their shift, finding a corpse at the place of their first assignment.

When the shift is over, both men go for a drink, and they find their colleague Dan very drunk in a casino. This night, the police are on their way to raid the casino, but Casey hears about the raid, and manages to warn both his colleagues and the casino owner, causing the raid to be a complete failure.

The next day, both Casey and Joe are accused of tipping off the owner and causing the raid to be unsuccessful. In an attempt to exculpate himself, Joe tells his boss about the reason for their involvement in the events, and about Dan's visit to the casino. The result is that Dan is fired from his position without notice.

Joe has been involved with one of the company's switchboard operators, Ethel Greenwood. They split up when he suspected her of dating his partner, Dan, one night when Joe was working overtime. He reconciles with her. However, soon after they are reunited, Dan tells Ethel about how he got fired from work, and Ethel is upset with Joe for causing it. They break up again.

Joe and Ethel do not see each other for a while, but he hears she quit her job and has started working for another company with Dan. It turns out the office where they work is a cover-up for a racketeering operation run by two men, George and Max. Their illegal business idea consists of tapping into the phone lines of a nearby investment company to get secret stock tips.

Joe is unaware of this sly operation, until one day when he and Casey are sent to investigate the investment company’s phone lines. They have complained about the lines malfunctioning, and when Joe sees the tap he discloses the racketeering operation. Joe catches Dan red handed, as he is trying to get into the investment company’s vaults and steal the contents. Joe and Casey are captured and bound by the criminals, but Joe uses a pocket knife to short the electric line to the local firestation, which brings help—but the firemen leave when they find no smoke. On their second attempt, Casey knocks over a can of kerosene and a lamp and sets the place on fire, as Joe again shorts out the wire. The firmen arrive for a second time, just in time to save Joe and Casey;s lives, although is hospitalized with severe burns.

The robbery in progress is stopped, but Dan manages to escape from the crime scene. Joe tips off the police about Dan, and they go to his apartment. When they arrive, Ethel is already there to meet with Dan for their trip to Mexico with the bounty from the robbery. Ethel had found Dan shot and killed in the apartment, and comes running out into the street in a state of hysteria. When the police catch her, they find that Dan died with a torn check made out to her in his hands, and it has her fingerprints on it. Ethel is arrested for killing Dan and being an accomplice in the racketeering operation.

Joe is doubtful of Ethel's involvement in the illegal business, and he does not believe that she killed Dan. He decides to find Dan's other girlfriend and partner in crime, Pearl Latour. Joe and Casey search Long Beach to find her, and eventually they do. Pearl confesses to Joe that she indeed killed Dan, and that the reason was that he was trying to trick her and take the money that was hers by signing it over to Ethel. While Joe and Pearl are still talking, the Long Beach earthquake of 1933 strikes the whole area, and the house they are in caves in from the shaking. They run into the street and Pearl is partially buried under falling debris. To get Pearl's story about how she killed Dan, Joe and Casey use an emergency phone line to connect her to the Los Angeles Chief of Police. Pearl's last confession is heard by the police and recorded on a dictaphone, and Ethel is released. On her release, Ethel and Joe are both guests at Casey and his fiancée Maizie's wedding at city hall, at which Ethel persuades Joe to get a marriage license of his own.

== Cast ==
- Spencer Tracy as Joe Graham
- Jack Oakie as Casey
- Constance Cummings as Ethel Greenwood
- Morgan Conway as Dan Sutter
- Arline Judge as Maizie Bryan
- Paul Harvey as James Regan
- Judith Wood as Pearl La Tour
- Joe Sawyer as Henchman Max Stanley
- Robert Elliott as Police Captain Flynn
- Franklyn Ardell as George Martin, Troubleshooter
- Paul Porcasi as Cabaret Manager
- Charles Lane as Switchboard Operator
