= Persons in Hiding =

1939 film by Louis King

- Theatrical release poster
- Directed by: Louis King
- Screenplay by: William R. Lipman; Horace McCoy
- Produced by: William LeBaron
- Starring: Lynne Overman; Patricia Morison; J. Carrol Naish; William "Bill" Henry; Helen Twelvetrees; William Frawley
- Cinematography: Harry Fischbeck
- Edited by: Hugh Bennett
- Music by: John Leipold; Floyd Morgan; Leo Shuken
- Production company: Paramount Pictures
- Distributed by: Paramount Pictures
- Release date: February 10, 1939
- Running time: 70 minutes
- Country: United States
- Language: English

Persons in Hiding is a 1939 American crime film directed by Louis King and written by William R. Lipman and Horace McCoy. The film stars Lynne Overman, Patricia Morison, J. Carrol Naish, William "Bill" Henry, Helen Twelvetrees and William Frawley. The film was released on February 10, 1939, by Paramount Pictures.

It was one of several films that were based on the book Persons in Hiding, credited to J. Edgar Hoover, but generally believed to have been ghosted by Courtney Ryley Cooper.

It was a fictionalization of the pursuit of Machine Gun Kelly and his wife, Kathryn, with elements of Bonnie and Clyde.

== Plot ==
Beautiful Dorothy Bronson has a big thirst for luxury, perfume and furs, due to this, she turns thief Freddie Martin into a notorious armed robber for her needs, and eventually gets him sent to Alcatraz.

== Cast ==
- Lynne Overman as Agent Pete Griswold
- Patricia Morison as Dorothy Bronson
- J. Carrol Naish as Freddie 'Gunner' Martin
- William "Bill" Henry as Agent Dan Waldron
- Helen Twelvetrees as Helen Griswold
- William Frawley as Alec Inglis
- Judith Barrett as Blase Blonde
- William Collier, Sr. as Burt Nast
- May Boley as Mme. Thompson
- Dennis Morgan as Mike Flagler
- Virginia Vale as Flo
- John Hartley as Joe, Dot's Boyfriend
- Janet Waldo as Ruth Waldron
- Richard Denning as Powder
- Leona Roberts as Ma Bronson
- Phil Warren as Curly
- John Eldredge as Chief Agent Gordon Kingsley
- Richard Carle as Zeke Bronson
- Roy Gordon as John Nast
- John Hart as Male Stenographer
- Lillian Yarbo as Beauty Parlor Maid
