= After Tomorrow =

1932 film directed by Frank Borzage

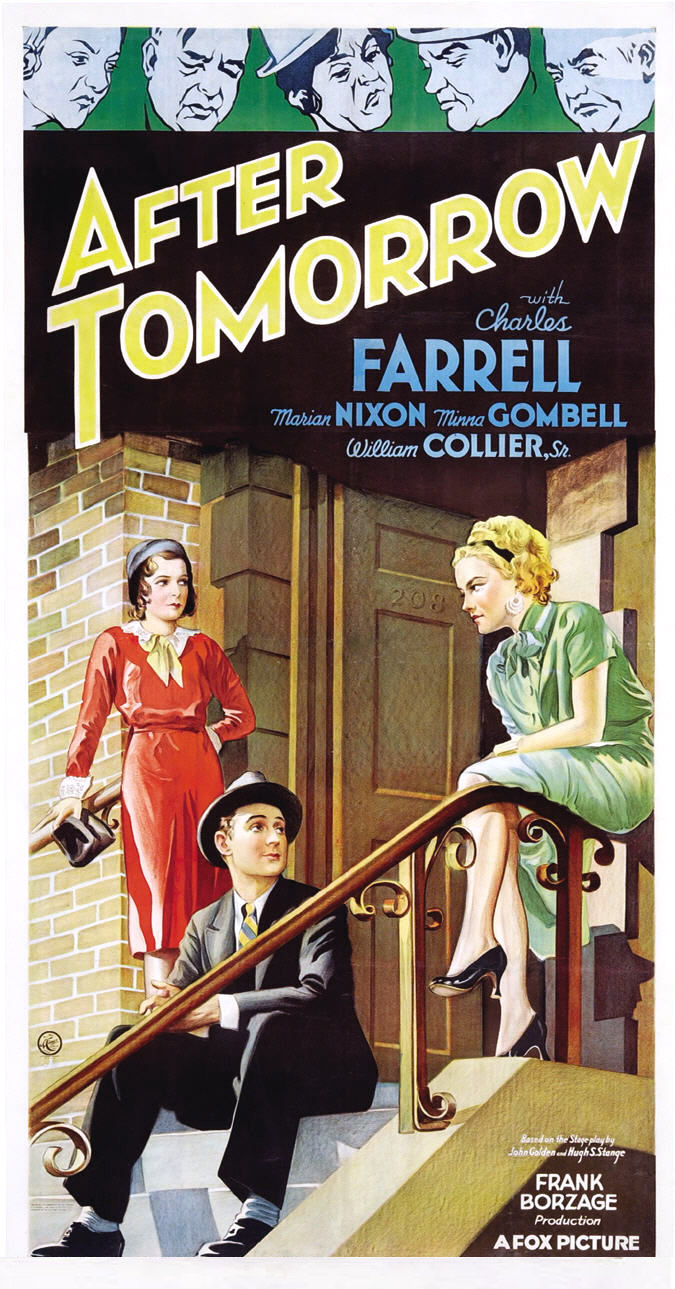
- Theatrical release three-sheet poster
- Directed by: Frank Borzage
- Written by: Sonya Levien
- Based on: the 1931 play After Tomorrow by John Golden and Hugh Stanislaus Stange
- Starring: Charles Farrell; Marian Nixon
- Cinematography: James Wong Howe
- Edited by: Margaret Clancey
- Music by: Hugo Friedhofer (uncredited)
- Production company: Fox Film Corporation
- Distributed by: Fox Film Corporation
- Release date: March 6, 1932
- Running time: 79 minutes
- Country: United States
- Language: English

After Tomorrow is a 1932 American pre-Code drama film directed by Frank Borzage and starring Charles Farrell, Marian Nixon, Minna Gombell, Josephine Hull and William Collier, Sr.

== Plot ==
Peter Piper and his girlfriend Sidney Taylor have been engaged for a long time (three years), but the economic situation of the Great Depression and the selfish demands of their respective mothers have delayed their marriage. They imagine their future together "after tomorrow" in the lyrics of their favorite song.

While clinging Mrs. Piper, a widow completely fixated on her boy, cannot bear the thought that her son will one day leave her, does her best to break up Sidney and Peter's relationship. Sidney's mother, Else Taylor thinks only of her own needs, and her lover, Malcolm Jarvis, a lodger in their house, with whom she leaves for good the day before Pete and Sidney's wedding, causing a second heart attack to Willie, Sidney's father. The wedding has to be postponed for another half of a year. When finally Else comes back to help her daughter and Pete financially, but Willie does not allow it.

Pete finds the courage to face his mother's boyfriend, Mr. Beardsley, owner of a chewing gum factory, giving him the same as his mother gives to Sidney, and while arguing if he has serious intentions with his mother, Mr. Beardsley tells him that the hundred dollars he invested in his factory had a revenue of $740 at that point. So finally they can marry and go to Niagara Falls.

== Cast ==
- Charles Farrell as Peter Piper
- Marian Nixon as Sidney Taylor
- Minna Gombell as Else Taylor
- William Collier, Sr. as Willie Taylor
- Josephine Hull as Mrs. Piper
- William Pawley as Malcolm Jarvis
- Greta Granstedt as Betty
- Ferdinand Munier as Mr. Beardsley
- Nora Lane as Florence Blandy

== Critical reception ==
Lionel Collier, for the British magazine, Picturegoer, wrote, "Frank Borzage is one of those directors who know so well how to mingle romance, sentiment, and sex into a palatable and interesting entertainment." He thought the decision to pair Charles Farrell and Marian Nixon was "a very good move" and wrote that Farrell’s role well suited him, while Nixon was "developing along Janet Gaynor lines" and gave a "natural and charming performance."
