= Meet Danny Wilson (film) =

1952 film by Joseph Pevney

- Film poster by Reynold Brown
- Directed by: Joseph Pevney
- Screenplay by: Don McGuire
- Story by: Don McGuire
- Produced by: Leonard Goldstein
- Starring: Frank Sinatra; Shelley Winters; Alex Nicol
- Cinematography: Maury Gertsman
- Edited by: Virgil W. Vogel
- Color process: Black and white
- Production company: Universal International Pictures
- Distributed by: Universal Pictures
- Release dates: February 7, 1952 (Los Angeles); March 26, 1952 (New York)
- Running time: 88 minutes
- Country: United States
- Language: English

Meet Danny Wilson is a 1952 American crime drama and musical film directed by Joseph Pevney and starring Frank Sinatra, Shelley Winters and Alex Nicol.

== Plot ==
Hot-tempered singer Danny Wilson and his easygoing pianist friend Mike Ryan meet singer Joy Carroll. Danny slugs a cop and is thrown in jail, but Joy arranges his bail and a job at mobster Nick Driscoll's club. However, Nick demands 50% of all earnings, past and future, and he loves Joy. The cops are watching eye on Nick, a suspect in a murder.

Joy eventually realizes that she truly loves Mike, but he is reluctant to steal his best friend's girl. Danny brashly announces his engagement to Joy without first consulting her. Danny catches her with Mike, becomes drunk and punches Nick, who brandishes a gun. Mike intercepts a bullet that Nick shoots at Danny.

The police follow Danny to a park, where he intends to exact revenge on Nick. At the last second, the police save him. Danny begins accept the romance between Joy and Mike, who visit him for his next stage engagement.

== Cast ==
- Frank Sinatra as Danny Wilson
- Shelley Winters as Joy Carroll
- Alex Nicol as Mike Ryan
- Raymond Burr as Nick Driscoll
- Vaughn Taylor as T.W. Hatcher
- Tommy Farrell as Tommy Wells
- Donald MacBride as Police Desk Sergeant
- Barbara Knudson as Marie
- Carl Sklover as Cab Driver

== Production ==
The film features cameos by Tony Curtis and Jeff Chandler.

Sinatra had experienced a painful separation from first wife Nancy before production of the film. His career was slumping, he faced money worries and his relationship with second wife Ava Gardner was volatile, and he began to lose weight from his already thin frame. Costar Shelley Winters, already in a contentious feud with Sinatra, became concerned that she appeared fat by comparison.

== Music ==
• "You're a Sweetheart": music by Jimmy McHugh, lyrics by Harold Adamson, performed by Sinatra

• "Lonesome Man Blues": written by Sy Oliver, performed by Sinatra with Danny Welton on harmonica

• "She's Funny That Way": music by Neil Moret, lyrics by Richard A. Whiting, performed by Sinatra

• "A Good Man Is Hard to Find": written by Eddie Green, performed by Winters, reprised by Sinatra and Winters

• "That Old Black Magic": music by Harold Arlen, lyrics by Johnny Mercer, performed by Sinatra

• "When You're Smiling": written by Mark Fisher, Joe Goodwin and Larry Shay, performed by Sinatra

• "All of Me": music by Gerald Marks, lyrics by Seymour Simons, performed by Sinatra

• "I've Got a Crush on You": music by George Gershwin, lyrics by Ira Gershwin, performed by Sinatra

• "How Deep Is the Ocean?", written by Irving Berlin, performed by Sinatra

== Reception ==
In a contemporary review for The New York Times, critic A. H. Weiler wrote: "Don McGuire, the scenarist, who might even have borrowed a few notes from Mr. Sinatra's actual biography, has fashioned a transparent but generally cheerful tale ... The story, as has been noted, is not a model of ingenuity, but the scenarist, the principals and Joseph Pevney, the director, run through their chores briskly and in the snappy argot of professional entertainers and Tin Pan Alley."

Critic Philip K. Scheuer of the Los Angeles Times noted: "Danny's rise to fame and fortune as crooner and bobby-sox idol is so much like Frankie's that the parallel is inescapable. ... [T]his U-I picture has something of the same slack-jointed structure as its protagonist—a wild blow here, a tame note there, as informal with its bullets as its ballads."
