= William Collier Sr. =

American actor, screenwriter and director

William Collier Sr
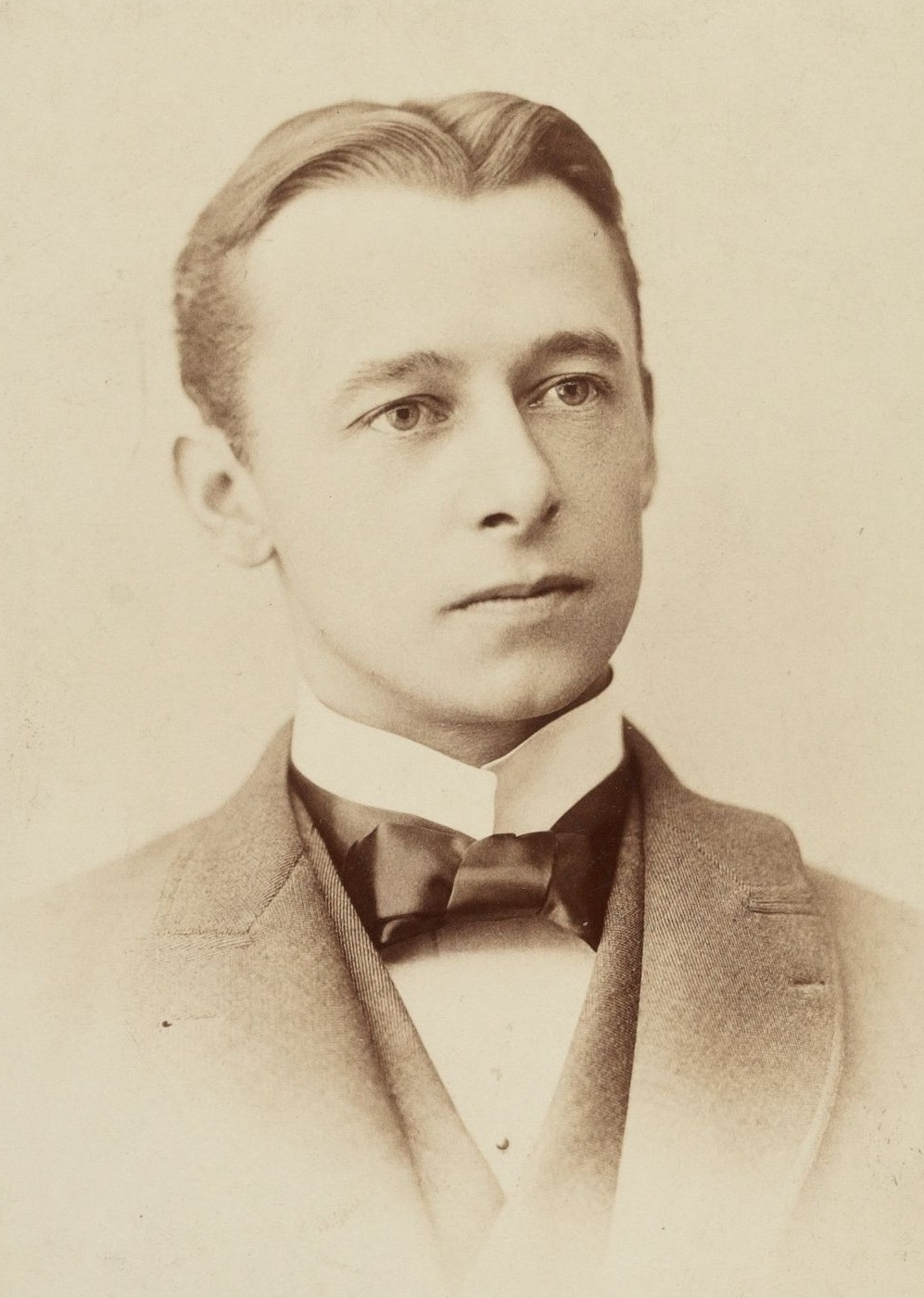
- Born: William Morenus; November 12, 1864; New York City, U.S.
- Died: January 13, 1944 (aged 79); Beverly Hills, California, U.S.
- Burial place: Forest Lawn Memorial Park
- Occupations: Writer, director, actor on stage and screen
- Years active: 1916–1941
- Spouse(s): Louise Allen (?–1909) (her death); Paula Marr (1910–?)
- Children: William Collier Jr.

William Collier Sr. (November 12, 1864 – January 13, 1944), born William Morenus, was an American writer, director and actor.

Collier ran away from home when only 11 years old to join a touring company run by Eddie Foy and in 1879 he appeared as a juvenile in H.M.S. Pinafore. After a notable stage career, he tried motion pictures, under producer Mack Sennett. He then went back to the stage for some years but returned to films when the talkies came along.

In 1910, he appeared at the Elitch Theatre in Denver, Colorado, while his adopted son, stage named William Collier Jr., was recovering from scarlet fever that was followed by typhoid. His son recovered and was able to join his father in a production of The Patriot.

He "once opened The Patriot, one of his own plays, on December 30. On January 2 he advertised with some degree of truthfulness: 'Second Year in New York.'"

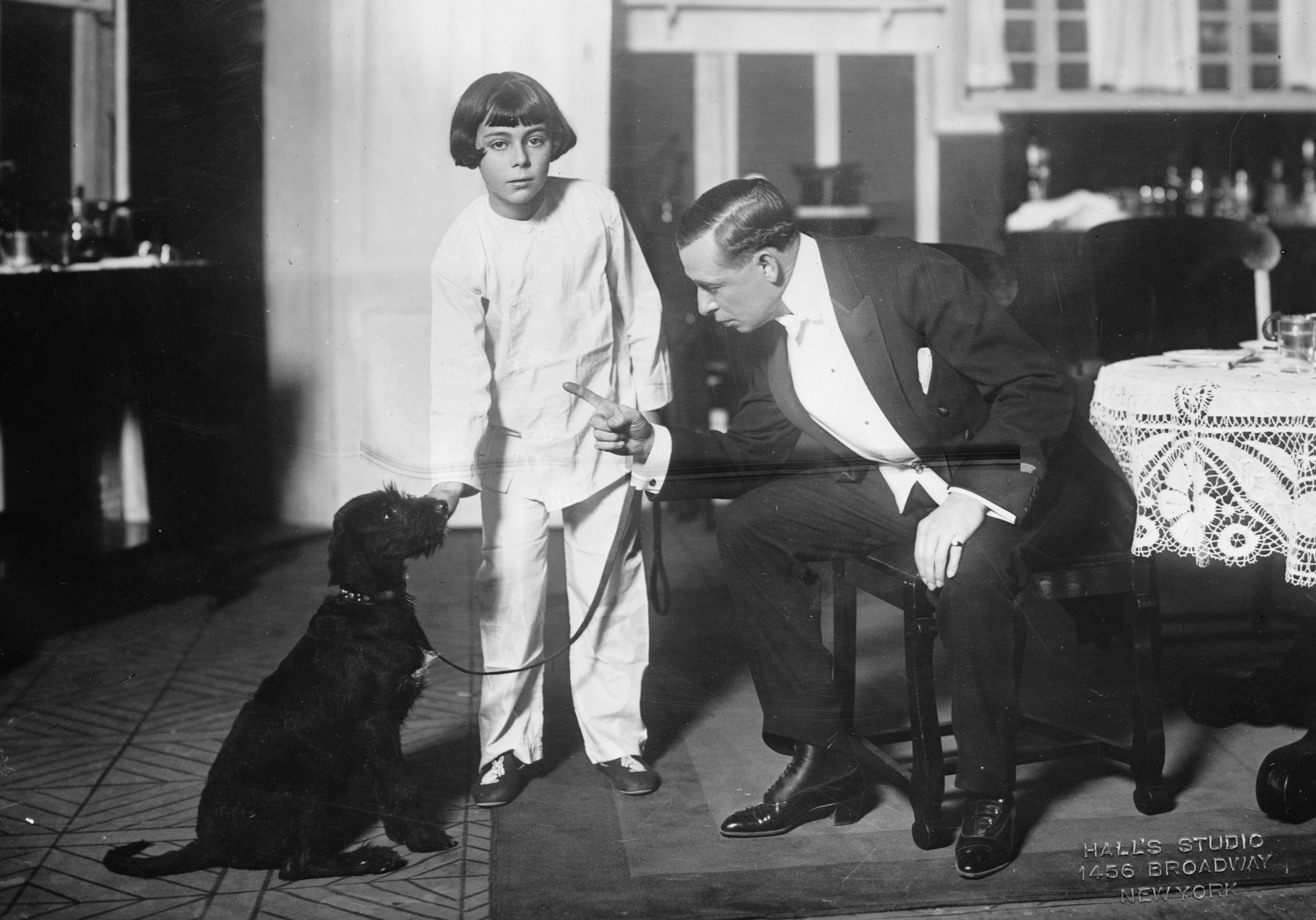
Collier with son William Collier Jr.

He was married to the actress Louise Allen; she died in 1909 and he married Paula Marr the following year, adopting her son Charles, whom he renamed William Collier Jr. On Broadway he starred as the gambler Gideon Holtz in Rudolf Friml's The Wild Rose at the Martin Beck Theatre in 1926.

Collier died of pneumonia in 1944. He was interred at the Forest Lawn Memorial Park in Glendale, California.

== Partial filmography ==
- Never Again (1916, Short)
- Better Late Than Never (1916, Short) - The Art Student
- The No-Good Guy (1916) - Jimmy Coghlan
- The Servant Question (1920) - Mr. Butler
- Happy Days (1929) - End Man - Minstrel Show
- Harmony at Home (1930) - Joe Haller
- Free and Easy (1930) - Himself - Master of Ceremonies at Premiere
- High Society Blues (1930) - Horace Divine
- She's My Weakness (1930) - David Tuttle
- Up the River (1930) - Pop
- Seas Beneath (1931) - Mugs O'Flaherty (uncredited)
- Mr. Lemon of Orange (1931) - Mr. Blake
- 6 Cylinder Love (1931) - Richard Burton
- Annabelle's Affairs (1931) - Wickham
- The Brat (1931) - Judge Emmett A. O'Flaherty
- Stepping Sisters (1932) - Herbert Ramsey
- After Tomorrow (1932) - Willie Taylor
- The Washington Masquerade (1932) - Babcock
- Hot Saturday (1932) - Mr. Brock
- Madison Square Garden (1932) - Doc Williams
- All of Me (1934) - Jerry Helman
- The Crosby Case (1934) - The Detective-Police Sgt. Melody
- Cheaters (1934) - K.C. Kelly
- A Successful Failure (1934) - Ellery Cushing a.k.a. Uncle Dudley
- The Murder Man (1935) - 'Pop' Grey
- Annapolis Farewell (1935) - Rumboat Charlie
- The Bride Comes Home (1935) - Alfred Desmereau
- Love on a Bet (1936) - Uncle Carlton MacCreigh
- Give Us This Night (1936) - Priest
- Cain and Mabel (1936) - Pop Walters
- Valiant Is the Word for Carrie (1936) - Ed Moresby
- Josette (1938) - David Brassard Sr.
- Thanks for the Memory (1938) - Mr. Platt
- Say It in French (1938) - Howland
- Persons in Hiding (1939) - Burt Nast
- I'm from Missouri (1939) - Smith
- Invitation to Happiness (1939) - Mr. Wayne
- Television Spy (1939) - James Llewellyn
- Disputed Passage (1939) - Dr. William Cunningham
- Miracle on Main Street (1939) - Dr. Miles
- The Hard-Boiled Canary (1941) - Dr. Joseph E. Maddy (final film role)
