= Armored Car (film) =

1937 film directed by Lewis R. Foster

- Theatrical release poster
- Directed by: Lewis R. Foster
- Screenplay by: Lewis R. Foster; Robert N. Lee
- Story by: William A. Pierce
- Produced by: E. M. Asher
- Starring: Robert Wilcox; Judith Barrett; Cesar Romero; Irving Pichel; David Oliver; William Lundigan
- Cinematography: Stanley Cortez
- Edited by: Frank Gross
- Production company: Universal Pictures
- Distributed by: Universal Pictures
- Release date: June 1, 1937
- Running time: 64 minutes
- Country: United States
- Language: English

Armored Car is a 1937 American crime film directed by Lewis R. Foster and written by Lewis R. Foster and Robert N. Lee. The film stars Robert Wilcox, Judith Barrett, Cesar Romero, Irving Pichel, David Oliver and William Lundigan. The film was released on June 1, 1937, by Universal Pictures.

== Plot ==
The plot is built around detective Larry Wills, who goes undercover to dismantle a group of hijackers.

== Cast ==
- Robert Wilcox as Larry Wills
- Judith Barrett as Ella Logan
- Cesar Romero as Petack
- Irving Pichel as Walinsky
- David Oliver as Bubbles
- William Lundigan as Henry Hutchins
- J. Anthony Hughes as Bill Wane
- Tom Kennedy as Tiny
- Harry Davenport as Pop Logan
- Inez Courtney as Blind Date
- Rollo Lloyd as Organist
- Richard Tucker as John Hale
- John Kelly as Frenchie
- Joe King as Sheridan
- Paul Fix as Slim
- Jack Powell as Fat
