= John Kelly (actor) =

American actor (1901–1947)

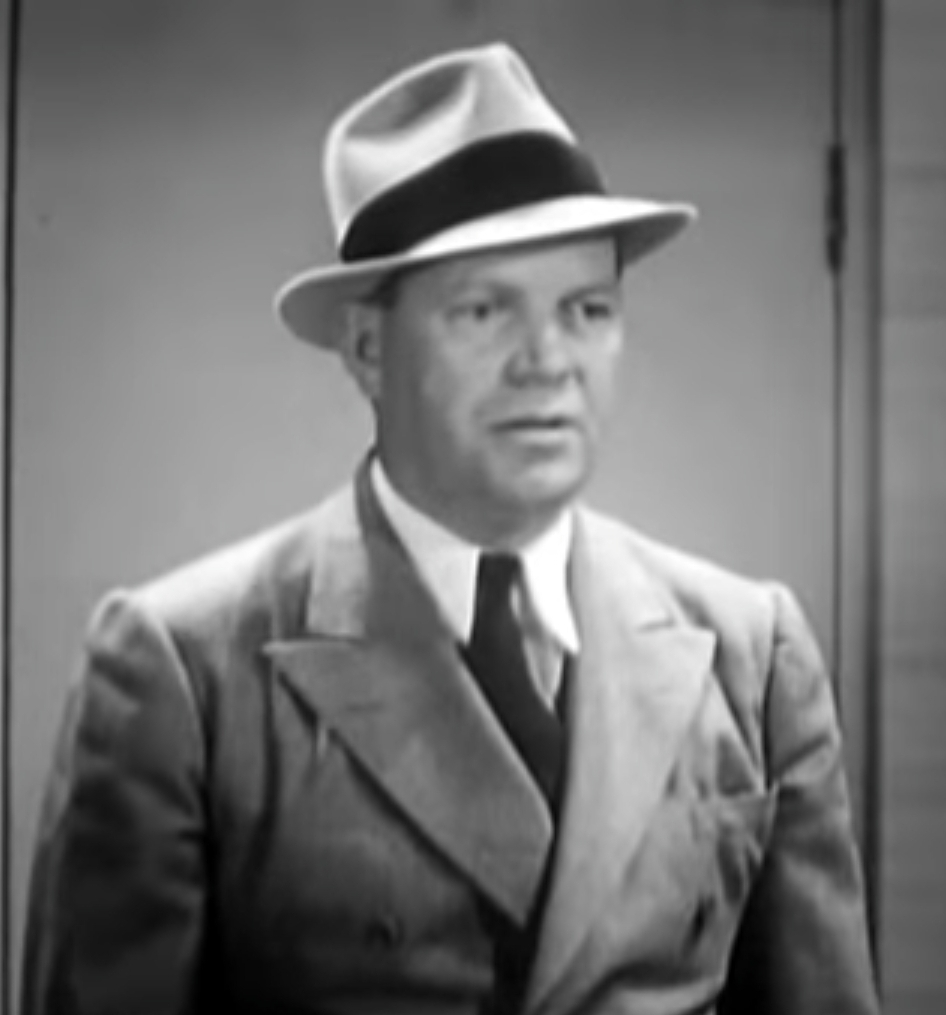
- Kelly in Lady Luck (1936)
- Born: John F. Kelly; June 29, 1901; Boston, Massachusetts, U.S.
- Died: December 9, 1947 (aged 46); Los Angeles, California, U.S.
- Occupation: Actor
- Years active: 1928–1947

John F. Kelly (June 6, 1901 – December 9, 1947) was an American actor whose career spanned the very end of the silent film era through the 1940s. While most of his parts were smaller, often-uncredited roles, he was occasionally given a more substantial supporting or even featured role.

== Life and career ==
John F. Kelly was born in Boston, Massachusetts on June 29, 1901. He broke into the film industry in 1928 when he was cast as the chauffeur in the Fox silent film, Blindfold. He worked in two more Fox films in 1928, both directed by Irving Cummings. The first was Dressed To Kill, starring Mary Astor, where he played the supporting role of Biff Simpson; while the second was in the small role of a window-washer in Romance of the Underworld, again starring Astor. In 1929 he appeared in only one film, in the role of O'Farrell in the Warner Bros. film, From Headquarters, starring Monte Blue.

Kelly's first appearance in a sound film, was in 1930's The Man Hunter, with its canine hero Rin Tin Tin.

During the 1930s, Kelly appeared in numerous films, mainly in small, uncredited roles. In 1933 he had a small role in Morning Glory, for which Katharine Hepburn won her first Oscar; and another in Raoul Walsh's The Bowery, which starred Wallace Beery, George Raft, and Jackie Cooper. In 1934 he had a featured role as Canvas Back in Shirley Temple's starring debut, Little Miss Marker. That same year he played one of Eddie Cantor's stepbrothers in Kid Millions, and then appeared in the featured role of Chuck in Lambert Hillyer's 1934 police drama, Men of the Night. Kelly had a small part in the 1935 romantic comedy We're in the Money, starring Joan Blondell and Glenda Farrell, followed by another small role in Public Hero No. 1, a 1935 crime drama starring Lionel Barrymore and Jean Arthur.

In 1936 Kelly played the famous boxer, John L. Sullivan in a featured role in Irving Pichel's drama, The Gentleman from Louisiana (1936). Later in 1936 he reunited with Shirley Temple in the supporting role of Ferguson in 1936's Poor Little Rich Girl. Again that year he appeared in the role of Harold in the detective comedy After the Thin Man, starring William Powell and Myrna Loy. Kelly would finish out 1936 with two featured roles: that of Rusty in the comedy Polo Joe, starring Joe E. Brown, and as Kid Couch in the 1936 drama Fugitive in the Sky.

In 1937 Kelly appeared in the featured role of Maxie in the comedy, Angel's Holiday, followed by his featured role as Deuces in the 1937 crime film, The Big Shot, starring Guy Kibbee. Kelly would close out the decade appearing in almost a dozen films. These include the featured role of the simple-minded policeman Elmer in the screwball comedy classic, Bringing Up Baby (1938), starring Hepburn and Cary Grant, as Butch in the 1939 comedy, Sudden Money, starring Charlie Ruggles, and as John Cass in the first of the Dr. Christian films, Meet Dr. Christian, starring Jean Hersholt.

Kelly would start off the 1940s by playing Pete Hawks in the 1940 Universal movie serial The Green Hornet, which starred Gordon Jones in the title role. Also in 1940 he had a small role in the first of the Bob Hope and Bing Crosby "Road" films, Road to Singapore. The following year, Kelly played the feature role of Buffalo Bill Oxenstern in the Warner Bros. comedy, Three Sons o' Guns. He also had a featured role, that of Knockout Riley, in the 1941 sports film, The Pittsburgh Kid. In 1942 he was featured in the role of Snork in Jail House Blues, directed by Albert S. Rogell. That same year he also appeared in Moontide, in the featured role of Mac. Moontide was directed by Archie Mayo and Fritz Lang, and starred Jean Gabin and Ida Lupino. Kelly reprised the role of John L. Sullivan, which he had earlier played in 1936, in the 20th Century Fox musical, My Gal Sal, starring Rita Hayworth and Victor Mature.

Over the next few years Kelly would play small roles in such films as No Time for Love (1943), Coney Island (1943), Sweet Rosie O'Grady (1943), Up in Arms (1944), Wing and a Prayer (1944), and Nob Hill. His next featured role was in the 1945 B-film, The Tiger Woman, in the role of Sylvester. In 1946 he had the featured role of Sammy in Joe Palooka, Champ, the first film in the Joe Palooka series. After small roles in Blue Skies (1946), The Mighty McGurk (1947), and Ladies' Man, Kelly played the role of the Sheriff in the 1947 British drama, Captain Boycott. Kelly's final role would be in the featured role of Lt. Commander Stark in the espionage drama, Sofia, starring Gene Raymond. The film was released after Kelly's death.

== Death ==
Kelly died on December 9, 1947, in Los Angeles, California.

== Filmography ==
(Per AFI database)

- Blindfold (1928)
- Dressed To Kill (1928)
- Romance of the Underworld (1928)
- From Headquarters (1929)
- The Man Hunter (1930)
- Subway Express (1931)
- The Devil Is Driving (1932)
- The All American (1932)
- Ann Vickers (1933)
- Broadway Thru a Keyhole (1933)
- Morning Glory (1933)
- The Bowery (1933)
- Three-Cornered Moon (1933)
- Goodbye Love (1933)
- Kid Millions (1934)
- Murder in the Private Car (1934)
- Little Miss Marker (1934)
- Many Happy Returns (1934)
- The Band Plays On (1934)
- Men of the Night (1934)
- We're in the Money (1935)
- Special Agent (1935)
- Dr. Socrates (1935)
- Motive for Revenge (1935)
- Navy Wife (1935)
- Whipsaw (1935)
- West Point of the Air (1935)
- Public Hero No. 1 (1935)
- Woman Wanted (1935)
- Stolen Harmony (1935)
- It Had to Happen (1936)
- After the Thin Man (1936)
- Easy Money (1936)
- The Bridge of Sighs (1936)
- The Walking Dead (1936)
- Polo Joe (1936)
- Poor Little Rich Girl (1936)
- Tough Guy (1936)
- Timothy's Quest (1936)
- The Gentleman from Louisiana (1936)
- In Paris, A.W.O.L. (1936)
- Fugitive in the Sky (1936)
- Lady Luck (1936)
- The Devil Is a Sissy (1936)
- San Francisco (1936)
- Our Relations (1936)
- Exclusive (1937)
- Angel's Holiday (1937)
- You Can't Buy Luck (1937)
- Portia on Trial (1937)
- The Last Gangster (1937)
- The Big Shot (1937)
- 23 1/2 Hours Leave (1937)
- That's My Story (1937)
- Armored Car (1937)
- Merry-Go-Round of 1938 (1937)
- Live, Love and Learn (1937)
- Wings over Honolulu (1937)
- Behind the Mike (1937)
- Female Fugitive (1938)
- The Crowd Roars (1938)
- The Sisters (1938)
- Bringing Up Baby (1938)
- Exposed (1938)
- Convicts at Large (1938)
- Meet Dr. Christian (1939)
- Wolf Call (1939) as Bull Nelson
- Sergeant Madden (1939)
- Sudden Money (1939)
- Kid Nightingale (1939)
- East of the River (1940)
- Road to Singapore (1940) as Sailor
- Bowery Boy (1940)
- Castle on the Hudson (1940)
- I Want a Divorce (1940)
- Sandy Is a Lady (1940)
- Black Friday (1940)
- Blondie in Society (1941)
- Manpower (1941)
- The Pittsburgh Kid (1941)
- Reaching for the Sun (1941)
- Shadow of the Thin Man (1941)
- Three Sons O'Guns (1941)
- You're in the Army Now (1941)
- Dr. Broadway (1942)
- Girl Trouble (1942)
- Jail House Blues (1942) as Snork
- Larceny, Inc. (1942)
- Moontide (1942)
- My Favorite Blonde (1942)
- My Gal Sal (1942)
- Tales of Manhattan (1942)
- Ten Gentlemen from West Point (1942)
- Coney Island (1943)
- It's a Great Life (1943)
- Jack London (1943)
- No Time for Love (1943)
- Sweet Rosie O'Grady (1943)
- See Here, Private Hargrove (1944)
- Once Upon a Time (1944)
- Summer Storm (1944)
- Up in Arms (1944)
- Wing and a Prayer (1944)
- Blonde from Brooklyn (1945)
- I'll Tell the World (1945)
- Nob Hill (1945)
- That Night with You (1945)
- The Tiger Woman (1945)
- Wonder Man (1945)
- Trail to Vengeance (1945)
- Blue Skies (1946)
- The Dark Corner (1946)
- Joe Palooka, Champ (1946)
- Cross My Heart (1947)
- The Mighty McGurk (1947)
- Ladies' Man (1947)
- Sofia (1948)
