= Dressed to Kill (1928 film) =

1928 film by Irving Cummings

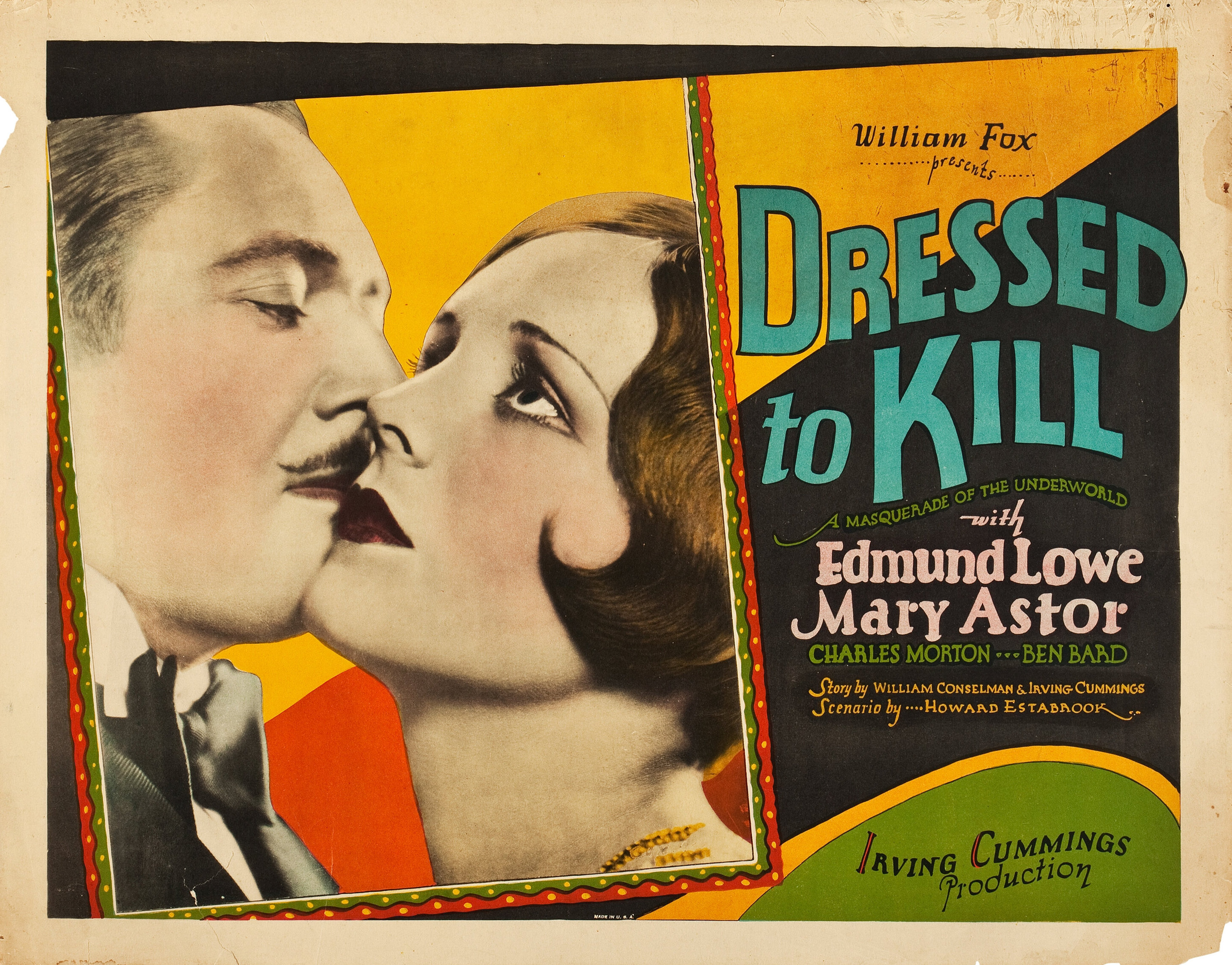
- Lobby card
- Directed by: Irving Cummings
- Written by: Malcolm Stuart Boylan
- Produced by: William Fox
- Starring: Mary Astor
- Cinematography: Conrad Wells
- Edited by: Frank E. Hull
- Distributed by: Fox Film Corporation
- Release date: March 18, 1928
- Running time: 70 minutes
- Country: United States
- Language: Silent (English intertitles)

Dressed to Kill is a 1928 silent drama film produced and distributed by Fox Film Corporation and starring Mary Astor and Edmund Lowe. Astor was on loan from Warner Bros., for the film.

Samuel L. Rothafel selected the film for the feature for the first anniversary of the New York City Roxy Theatre.

== Plot ==
The full film

The gang of a mob boss grow suspicious of his new girlfriend. She is a beautiful young woman, and they do not believe she would actually associate with the mob and wonder if she is really a police "plant". The mobsters dress nattily so as not to appear "out of place" in the ritzy neighborhoods prior to a heist.

== Cast ==
- Edmund Lowe - Mile-Away Barry
- Mary Astor - Jeanne
- Ben Bard - Nick
- Bob Perry - Ritzy Hogan
- Joe Brown - as himself
- Tom Dugan - Silky Levine
- John Kelly - Biff Simpson
- Robert Emmett O'Connor - Detective Gilroy
- R. O. Pennell - Professor
- Ed Brady - singing waiter
- Charles Morton - Jeanne's sweetheart
- Harry Dunkinson - uncredited
- Florence Wix - dressmaker (uncredited)

== Preservation ==
This is a surviving film at the Museum of Modern Art.

== Response ==
The New York Times review stated - "Edmund Lowe is capital as the well-tailored Barry. Mr. Barry likes a good round of golf on the day following a fruitful burglary. Mary Astor is charming as Jean, and R. O. Pennell makes the most of the "Professor's" rôle.".

== See also ==
- The Big City (1928)
- The Racket (1928)
