= Illegal Traffic =

1938 film by Louis King

- Theatrical release poster
- Directed by: Louis King
- Screenplay by: Robert Yost; Lewis R. Foster; Stuart Anthony
- Produced by: William LeBaron
- Starring: J. Carrol Naish; Mary Carlisle; Robert Preston; Judith Barrett; Pierre Watkin; Buster Crabbe; George McKay
- Cinematography: Henry Sharp
- Edited by: Harvey Johnston
- Music by: John Leipold; Leo Shuken
- Production company: Paramount Pictures
- Distributed by: Paramount Pictures
- Release date: November 4, 1938
- Running time: 67 minutes
- Country: United States
- Language: English

Illegal Traffic is a 1938 American crime film directed by Louis King and written by Robert Yost, Lewis R. Foster and Stuart Anthony. The film stars J. Carrol Naish, Mary Carlisle, Robert Preston, Judith Barrett, Pierre Watkin, Buster Crabbe and George McKay. The film was released on November 4, 1938, by Paramount Pictures.

== Cast ==
- J. Carrol Naish as Lewis Zomar
- Mary Carlisle as Carol Butler
- Robert Preston as Charles Bent Martin
- Judith Barrett as Marie Arden
- Pierre Watkin as Jigger
- Buster Crabbe as Steve
- George McKay as Frank 'Old Man' Butler
- Richard Denning as Silk Patterson
- Phil Warren as Dittmar
- Sheila Darcy as Mathilde
- Dolores Casey as Mamie
- Dennis Morgan as Cagey Miller
- John Hart as Davis
- Regis Toomey as Windy
- William B. Davidson as Dalton
- Joseph Crehan as Chief Daley
- Monte Blue as Captain Moran
- Archie Twitchell as Duke
- Morgan Conway as State's Attorney Ryan
- Emory Parnell as Lieutenant
