= Off the Record (film) =

1939 film by James Flood

- Theatrical release poster
- Directed by: James Flood
- Screenplay by: Niven Busch; Lawrence Kimble; Earl Baldwin
- Story by: Saul Elkins; Sally Sandlin
- Starring: Pat O'Brien; Joan Blondell; Bobby Jordan; Alan Baxter; William B. Davidson; Morgan Conway
- Cinematography: Charles Rosher
- Edited by: Thomas Richards
- Music by: Adolph Deutsch
- Production company: Warner Bros. Pictures
- Distributed by: Warner Bros. Pictures
- Release date: January 21, 1939
- Running time: 71 minutes
- Country: United States
- Language: English

Off the Record is a 1939 American drama film directed by James Flood and written by Niven Busch, Lawrence Kimble and Earl Baldwin. The film stars Pat O'Brien, Joan Blondell, Bobby Jordan, Alan Baxter, William B. Davidson and Morgan Conway. The film was released by Warner Bros. Pictures on January 21, 1939.

== Plot ==
Two newspaper reporters, Thomas "Breezy" Elliott and Jane Morgan, inadvertently send a boy named Mickey Fallon to reform school after they write an exposé of the illegal slot-machine racket the boy was a spotter for. Guilt-ridden, Jane convinces Breezy that they should marry in order to adopt Mickey so they can get him out of reform school.

== Cast ==
- Pat O'Brien as Thomas 'Breezy' Elliott
- Joan Blondell as Jane Morgan
- Bobby Jordan as Mickey Fallon
- Alan Baxter as Joe Fallon
- William B. Davidson as Scotty
- Morgan Conway as Lou Baronette
- Clay Clement as Jaeggers
- Selmer Jackson as Det. Mendall
- Addison Richards as Brand
- Pierre Watkin as Barton
- Joe King as Brown
- Douglas Wood as J.W.
- Armand Kaliz as Chatteau
- Emory Parnell as Policeman
