= Louise Allen (actress) =

American actress

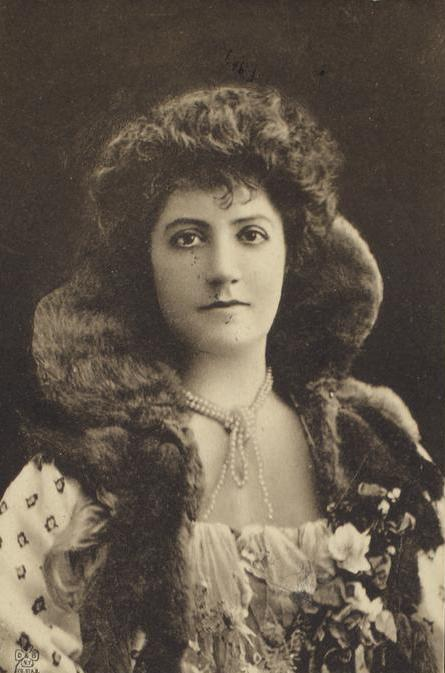
- Allen, c. 1900
- Born: c. 1870; New York, New York or San Francisco, California, U.S.
- Died: November 8, 1909 (aged 38–39); New York, New York
- Occupations: Stage actress, dancer
- Spouse: William Collier
- Family: Ricca Allen (sister)

Louise Allen (c. 1870–1909) was an American stage actress and dancer, known for comedic roles. She was the first wife of actor William Collier, with whom she appeared in several productions.

Allen was born around 1870 in San Francisco or New York City (Note: Sources vary on her birth place: New York, or San Francisco. Her birthplace is recorded as California in the 1870 and 1880 censuses. Her marriage certificate states San Francisco as place of birth. Once source gives her birth date as January 7, 1872, but she was counted in the 1870 census as 2 years old.) to John and Rachel Allen, both of English descent, and educated in San Francisco where her father was a musician. Her siblings included Ricca and Ray Allen, with whom she appeared as the Allen Sisters, a dancing troupe of the 1880s.

Her earliest appearance on the stage was at Niblo's Garden in June 1885, as Bessie in Around the World in Eighty Days. Three years later, she was seen at the Academy of Music in Mazulum, and returning to Niblo's Garden she later played Pepita in Mathias Sandorf. In 1889 she appeared at the Windsor Theatre in The Spider and the Fly. Her first substantial New York success was in 1890, as Ellen in Doctor Bill.

She married William Collier in 1892, and appeared with him in plays over the next several years, their last co-appearance being The Dictator in 1905. She then toured with Lew Fields and went into vaudeville. She died of heart disease at her New York City home on November 8, 1909. Her niece, also named Louise Allen, became a Broadway actress in the 1920s.
