= Blackwell's Island (film) =

1939 film by William C. McGann

- Theatrical release poster
- Directed by: William C. McGann
- Screenplay by: Crane Wilbur
- Story by: Crane Wilbur; Lee Katz
- Produced by: Bryan Foy
- Starring: John Garfield; Rosemary Lane; Dick Purcell; Victor Jory; Stanley Fields; Morgan Conway
- Cinematography: Sidney Hickox
- Edited by: Doug Gould
- Music by: Bernhard Kaun
- Production company: Warner Bros. Pictures
- Distributed by: Warner Bros. Pictures
- Release date: March 25, 1939
- Running time: 71 minutes
- Country: United States
- Language: English

Blackwell's Island is a 1939 American crime drama film directed by William C. McGann and written by Crane Wilbur. The film stars John Garfield, Rosemary Lane, Dick Purcell, Victor Jory, Stanley Fields and Morgan Conway. The film was released by Warner Bros. Pictures on March 25, 1939.

It was based on a real life scandal on Welfare Island.

== Plot ==
A reporter (Garfield) covers the racketeering of a mobster (Fields) which caused the assault of a boat captain. The mobster has a police officer (Purcell) beaten and the reporting causes the mobster to go to prison for it. The reporter then assaults a DA to get thrown into the prison to report on the mobster's corruption from jail.

== Cast ==
- John Garfield as Tim Haydon
- Rosemary Lane as Mary 'Sunny' Walsh
- Stanley Fields as 'Bull' Bransom
- Dick Purcell as Terry Walsh
- Victor Jory as Commissioner Thomas MacNair
- Morgan Conway as Steve Cardigan
- Granville Bates as Prison Warden Stuart 'Stu' Granger
- Anthony Averill as Brower
- Peggy Shannon as Pearl Murray
- Charley Foy as Benny Farmer
- Norman Willis as Mike Garth
- Joe Cunningham as Ben Rawden
- Wade Boteler as Capt. Pedersen
- William B. Davidson as Defense Attorney Hempel
- Milburn Stone Uncredited
