= The Big Shot (1937 film) =

1937 American comedy film directed by Edward Killy

- Directed by: Edward Killy; Bob Barnes (assistant)
- Screenplay by: Arthur T. Horman; Bert Granet
- Story by: Lawrence Pohle; Thomas Ahearn
- Produced by: Maury M. Cohen
- Starring: Guy Kibbee; Cora Witherspoon; Dorothy Moore; Russell Hicks
- Cinematography: Nicholas Musuraca
- Edited by: Jack Hively
- Production company: RKO Radio Pictures
- Distributed by: RKO Radio Pictures
- Release date: July 23, 1937
- Running time: 60 minutes
- Country: United States
- Language: English

The Big Shot is a 1937 American comedy film directed by Edward Killy from a screenplay by Arthur T. Horman and Bert Granet, based on a story by Lawrence Pohle and Thomas Ahearn. The film stars Guy Kibbee, Cora Witherspoon, Dorothy Moore and Russell Hicks. Produced and distributed by RKO Radio Pictures, the film premiered on July 23, 1937.

== Plot ==
Bertram Simms, a veterinarian in a small town, is quite content with his place in life. When he inherits a large estate and fortune from an unknown relative, he wishes to continue living in the small town. His wife, Elizabeth, has other plans; she wants their daughter, Peggy, to enter high society in the city where Bertram's uncle used to live. Upon their arrival at the uncle's mansion, things do not seem to add up properly.

Unbeknownst to the Simms, Bertram's uncle was the leader of a criminal gang. When Bertram is persuaded by Peggy's boyfriend, Chet, to purchase the newspaper that Chet works for which had been closed down by the gang, he restarts the paper's crusade to rid the city of its criminal element. When Elizabeth is conned into throwing a massive gala by the leader of the gang, Martin Blake, she believes the party will be the host to the crème de la crème of the city's society. During the party, Bertram is mistakenly identified as the leader of the city's criminal underworld. In spite of the misidentification, Bertram is cleared of any wrongdoing, and Blake and his men are apprehended by the police.

== Cast ==
- Guy Kibbee as Dr. Bertram Simms
- Cora Witherspoon as Elizabeth Simms
- Dorothy Moore as Peggy Simms
- Gordon Jones as Chester "Chet" Scott
- Russell Hicks as Martin Blake
- Frank M. Thomas as Murdock
- Dudley Clements as John "Honest John" McQuade
- George Irving as Police Chief
- Maxine Jennings as Gloria
- Barbara Pepper as Mamie
- Tom Kennedy as "Bugs"
- John Kelly as "Deuces"
- Eddie Gribbon as "Soapy"
- Al Hill as "Spots"
- Donald Kirke as Johnny Cullen

(Cast list as per AFI database)

== Production ==
During production the title of the film was Take the Heir.

== Reception ==
The Film Daily gave the film a positive review, stating that the "High content of laughs and able performances mark pleasing comedy". They went on to say that Killy's direction maximized the performances, while applauding the camera work of Nicholas Musuraca.Motion Picture Daily was also positive, praising Edward Killey's direction and calling the film amusing, but felt the plot had several interesting twists.

Motion Picture Herald addressed its comments to potential exhibitors and noted that the film was previewed with the musical comedy, New Faces of 1937. The result was The Big Shot's "comedy edge was blunted a bit, which suggests that it should be presented as companion piece to a more serious feature." They described the film as a "sometimes exciting and lively comedy, [and] sometimes it seems to be quite a lot to do about nothing."

Harrison's Reports called it "mildly amusing", and commented that it was slow-moving and that the plot was less than believable. They complimented Kibbee on his performance. Modern Screen also felt it was "mildly diverting", and while they thought the concept was amusing, they were less than pleased with the screenplay, and felt that Cora Witherspoon's performance was poor.
