= Josephine Hull =

American stage and film actress (1877–1957)

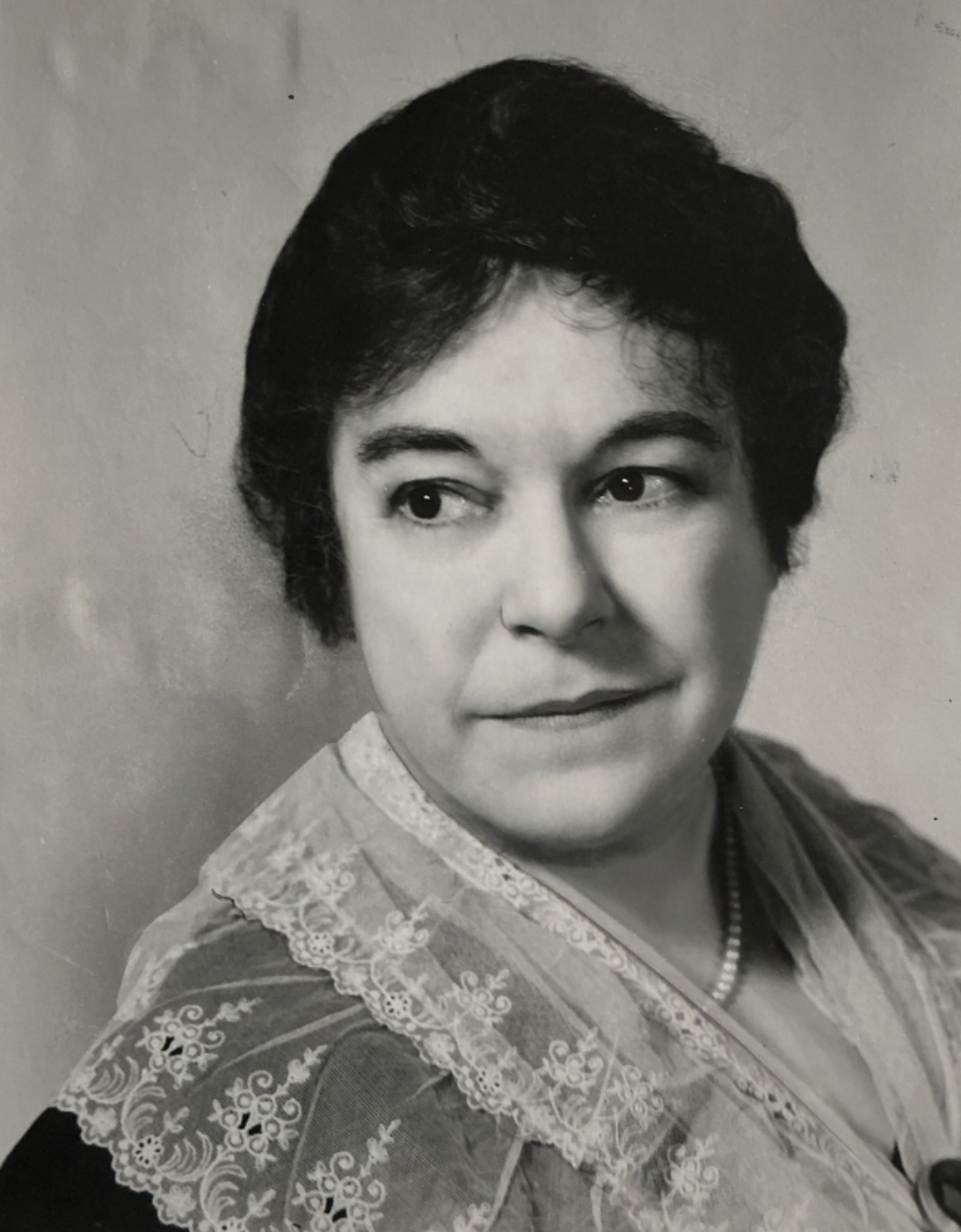
- Hull in the original Broadway production of Arsenic and Old Lace (1941)
- Born: Mary Josephine Sherwood; January 3, 1877; Newtonville, Massachusetts, U.S.
- Died: March 12, 1957 (aged 80); The Bronx, New York City, U.S.
- Education: Radcliffe College
- Occupation: Actress
- Years active: 1905–1955
- Spouse: Shelley Hull (m. 1910; died 1919)

Marie Josephine Hull (née Sherwood; January 3, 1877 – March 12, 1957) was an American stage and film actress who also was a director of plays. She had a successful 50-year career on stage while taking some of her better known roles to film. She won an Academy Award for Best Supporting Actress for the movie Harvey (1950), a role she originally played on the Broadway stage. She was sometimes credited as Josephine Sherwood.

== Background ==
Hull was born January 3, 1877, in Newtonville, Massachusetts, one of four children born to William H. Sherwood and Mary Elizabeth "Minnie" Tewkesbury, but would later shave years off her age.

== Career ==
=== Stage ===
Hull made her stage debut in 1905, and after some years as a chorus girl and touring stock player, she married actor Shelley Hull (the elder brother of actor Henry Hull) in 1910. After her husband's death as a young man, the actress retired until 1923, when she returned to acting using her married name, Josephine Hull. The couple had no children.

She had her first major stage success in George Kelly's Pulitzer-winning Craig's Wife in 1926. Kelly wrote a role especially for her in his next play, Daisy Mayme, which also was staged in 1926. She continued working in New York theater throughout the 1920s. In the 1930s and 1940s, Hull appeared in three Broadway hits, as a batty matriarch in You Can't Take It with You (1936), as a homicidal old lady in Arsenic and Old Lace (1941), and in Harvey (1944). The plays all had long runs, and took up ten years of Hull's career. Her last Broadway play, The Solid Gold Cadillac (1954–55), was later made into a film version with the much younger Judy Holliday in the role.

=== Film ===
Hull made only seven films, beginning in 1927 with a small part in the Clara Bow feature Get Your Man, followed by The Bishop's Candlesticks in 1929. That was followed by two 1932 Fox features, After Tomorrow (recreating her stage role) and Careless Lady.

She missed out on recreating her You Can't Take It With You role in 1938, as she was still onstage with the show. Instead, Spring Byington appeared in the film version.

Hull played Aunt Abby who, along with Jean Adair as Aunt Martha, was one of the two Brewster sisters in the film version of Arsenic and Old Lace (1944) starring Cary Grant and Priscilla Lane.

Hull then appeared in the screen version of Harvey (1950), for which she won the Academy Award for Best Supporting Actress. Variety credited Hull's performance: "the slightly balmy aunt (actually playing “Elwood's” sister, “Veta”) who wants to have Elwood committed, is immense, socking the comedy for every bit of its worth".

After Harvey, Hull made only one more film, The Lady from Texas (1951); she had also appeared in the CBS-TV version of Arsenic and Old Lace in 1949, with Ruth McDevitt, an actress who often succeeded Hull in her Broadway roles, as her sister.

== Death ==
Hull died on March 12, 1957, aged 80, from a cerebral hemorrhage.

== Broadway performances ==
- The Law and the Man (December 20, 1906 – Feb 1907, billed as Josephine Sherwood) Role: Cosette (Replacement)
- The Bridge (September 4, 1909 – Oct 1909, billed as Josephine Sherwood)
- Neighbors (December 26, 1923 – Jan 1924, billed as Josephine Hull) Role: Mrs. Hicks
- Fata Morgana (March 3, 1924 – October 11, 1924) Role: George's Mother
- Rosmersholm (May 5, 1925 – May 1925) Role: Madame Helseth
- Craig's Wife (October 12, 1925 – Aug 1926) Role: Mrs. Frazier
- Daisy Mayme (October 25, 1926 – Jan 1927) Role: Mrs. Olly Kipax
- The Wild Man of Borneo (September 13, 1927 – Sep 1927) Role: Mrs. Marshall
- March Hares (April 2, 1928 – Apr 1928) Role: Mrs. Janet Rodney
- The Beaux Stratagem (June 4, 1928 – Jun 1928) Role: Servant in the Inn
- Hotbed (November 8, 1928 – Nov 1928) Role: Hattie
- Before You're 25 (April 16, 1929 – May 1929) Role: Cornelia Corbin
- Those We Love (February 19, 1930 – Apr 1930) Role: Evelyn
- Midnight (December 29, 1930 – Feb 1931) Role: Mrs. Weldon
- Unexpected Husband (June 2, 1931 – Sep 1931) Role: Mrs. Egbert Busty
- After Tomorrow (August 26, 1931 – Nov 1931) Role: Mrs. Piper
- A Thousand Summers (May 24, 1932 – Jul 1932) Role: Mrs. Thompson
- American Dream (February 21, 1933 – Mar 1933) Role: Martha, Mrs. Schuyler Hamilton
- A Divine Drudge (October 26, 1933 – Nov 1933) Role: Frau Klapstuhl
- By Your Leave (January 24, 1934 – Feb 1934) Role: Mrs. Gretchell
- On to Fortune (February 4, 1935 – Feb 1935) Role: Miss Hedda Sloan
- Seven Keys to Baldpate (May 27, 1935 – Jun 1935) Role: Mrs. Quinby
- Night In the House (November 7, 1935 – Nov 1935) Role: Lucy Amorest
- You Can't Take It with You (December 14, 1936 – December 3, 1938) Role: Penelope Sycamore
- An International Incident (April 2, 1940 – April 13, 1940) Role: Mrs. John Wurthering Blackett
- Arsenic and Old Lace (January 10, 1941 – June 17, 1944) Role: Abby Brewster
- Harvey (November 1, 1944 – January 15, 1949) Role: Veta Louise Simmons
- Minnie and Mr. Williams (October 27, 1948 – October 30, 1948) Role: Minnie
- The Golden State (November 25, 1950 – December 16, 1950) Role: Mrs. Morenas
- Whistler's Grandmother (December 11, 1952 – January 3, 1953) Role: Kate
- The Solid Gold Cadillac (November 5, 1953 – February 12, 1955) Role: Mrs. Laura Partridge

== Broadway director credits ==
- Why Not? (December 25, 1922 – Apr 1923, billed as Mrs. Shelley Hull)
- The Rivals (May 7, 1923 – May 1923, billed as Mrs. Shelley Hull)
- The Habitual Husband (December 24, 1924 – Jan 1925)

== Filmography ==
Year	Title	Role	Awards
1927	Get Your Man	Simone de Villeneuve	
1929	The Bishop's Candlesticks	Persone	Short
1932	After Tomorrow	Mrs. Piper	
1932	Careless Lady	Aunt Cora	
1944	Arsenic and Old Lace	Aunt Abby Brewster	
1950	Harvey	Veta Louise Simmons	Academy Award for Best Supporting Actress; Golden Globe Award for Best Supporting Actress - Motion Picture
1951	The Lady from Texas	Miss Birdie Wheeler	

== Radio appearances ==
Year	Program	Episode/source
1952	Theatre Guild on the Air	The Meanest Man in the World

== See also ==
- List of actors with Academy Award nominations
