= Disputed Passage =

1939 film by Frank Borzage

- Australian trade ad
- Directed by: Frank Borzage
- Screenplay by: Anthony Veiller; Sheridan Gibney
- Based on: Disputed Passage by Lloyd C. Douglas
- Produced by: Harlan Thompson
- Starring: Dorothy Lamour; Akim Tamiroff; John Howard; Judith Barrett; William Collier, Sr.
- Cinematography: William C. Mellor
- Edited by: James Smith
- Music by: Friedrich Hollaender (as Friedrich Hollander); John Leipold
- Color process: Black and white
- Production company: Paramount Pictures
- Distributed by: Paramount Pictures
- Release date: October 25, 1939 (New York)
- Running time: 91 minutes
- Country: United States
- Language: English

Disputed Passage is a 1939 American drama war film directed by Frank Borzage and starring Dorothy Lamour, Akim Tamiroff, John Howard, Judith Barrett and William Collier Sr. Set in war-torn China, the film was described by The New York Times as a "lavish soap opera". The film was based on the bestselling novel of the same name by Lloyd C. Douglas and was produced by Paramount Pictures.

== Plot ==
Young medical student John Wesley Beaven is torn between the detached, cold pragmatism of Dr. Forster and the humanistic attitudes of kindly Dr. Cunningham. Matters are brought to a head when Beaven must choose between his career and impending marriage to fellow student Audrey Hilton. Dr. Forster convinces Audrey to return to her native China and let Beaven pursue his studies undistracted. She takes Forster's advice, but Beaven follows her. Once in the Orient he is injured in a bomb blast, and in a makeshift hospital, Dr. Forster must perform a risky operation to save Beaven's life.

== Cast ==
- Dorothy Lamour as Audrey Hilton
- Akim Tamiroff as Dr. "Tubby" Forster
- John Howard as John Wesley Beaven
- Judith Barrett as Winifred Bane
- William Collier Sr. as Dr. William Cunningham
- Victor Varconi as Dr. LaFerriere
- Gordon Jones as Bill Anderson
- Keye Luke as Andrew Abbott
- Elisabeth Risdon as Mrs. Cunningham
- Steve Pendleton as Lawrence Carpenter (as Gaylord Pendleton)
- Billy Cook as Johnny Merkle
- William Pawley as Mr. Merkle
- Renie Riano as Mrs. Riley
- Z. T. Nyi as Chinese Ambassador
- Philson Ahn as Kai
- E.Y. Chung as Dr Ling (as Dr. E.Y. Chung)
- Philip Ahn as Dr. Fung
- Dandan Li as Aviatrix (as Lee Ya-Ching)

== Reception ==
In a contemporary review for The New York Times, critic Frank S. Nugent accused Disputed Passage of "synthetic drama and not too subtle moralizing" and wrote: "[T]he film, particularly in its early phases, has been forcefully written and rather well played. While there no longer is much news in the conflict between the sympathetic, sentimental physician and the cold scientist who caustically challenges his medical class to find a human soul in their dissections, the topic remains a fertile and provocative one. ... [The] climax, proving the existence of a soul—at least, that's what we suppose it proved—rests entirely on an emotional appeal, and not too securely on that."
