= The Gentleman from Louisiana =

1936 film by Irving Pichel

- Directed by: Irving Pichel
- Screenplay by: Joseph Fields; Gordon Rigby
- Story by: Jerome Chodorov; Bert Granet
- Produced by: Nat Levine
- Starring: Eddie Quillan; Charles "Chic" Sale; Charlotte Henry; John Miljan; Marjorie Gateson; Pierre Watkin
- Cinematography: Jack A. Marta; Ernest Miller
- Edited by: Charles Craft
- Production company: Republic Pictures
- Distributed by: Republic Pictures
- Release date: August 15, 1936
- Running time: 67 minutes
- Country: United States
- Language: English

The Gentleman from Louisiana is a 1936 American drama film directed by Irving Pichel and written by Joseph Fields and Gordon Rigby. The film stars Eddie Quillan, Charles "Chic" Sale, Charlotte Henry, John Miljan, Marjorie Gateson and Pierre Watkin. The film was released on August 15, 1936, by Republic Pictures.

== Cast ==
- Eddie Quillan as Tod Mason
- Charles "Chic" Sale as Deacon Devlin
- Charlotte Henry as Linda Costigan
- John Miljan as Baltimore
- Marjorie Gateson as Fay Costigan
- Pierre Watkin as Roger Leland
- Charles C. Wilson as Diamond Jim Brady
- Holmes Herbert as Chief Steward
- Matt McHugh as Steve Brodie
- Snub Pollard as Hadley
- Gertrude Hoffman as Miss Langley
- Harrison Greene as Auctioneer
- Ruth Gillette as Lillian Russell
- John Kelly as John L. Sullivan
- Arthur Wanzer as Moran
- Kenneth Lawton as Brady's Butler
- Lowden Adams as Fairfield's Butler
