= I'm from Missouri =

1939 film by Theodore Reed

- Theatrical release poster
- Directed by: Theodore Reed
- Written by: Duke Atteberry; Jack Moffitt
- Produced by: Paul Jones
- Starring: Bob Burns; Gladys George; Gene Lockhart; Judith Barrett; William "Bill" Henry; Patricia Morison
- Cinematography: Merritt B. Gerstad
- Edited by: Archie Marshek
- Music by: John Leipold; Leo Shuken; Floyd Morgan
- Production company: Paramount Pictures
- Distributed by: Paramount Pictures
- Release date: April 7, 1939
- Running time: 85 minutes
- Country: United States
- Language: English

I'm from Missouri is a 1939 American comedy film directed by Theodore Reed and written by Duke Atteberry and Jack Moffitt. The film stars Bob Burns, Gladys George, Gene Lockhart, Judith Barrett, William "Bill" Henry and Patricia Morison. The film was released on April 7, 1939, by Paramount Pictures.

It is based on novels "Sixteen Hands" by Homer Croy (1938) and "Need of Change" by Julian Street(1909).

== Plot ==
Sweeney Bliss raises prize-winning mules in Missouri. He travels to London with a twofold purpose, to sell mules to the government there and to find a fitting husband for daughter Julie Bliss, perhaps a British dignitary or someone equally suitable.

Complications set in when rival Porgie Rowe also arrives from Missouri, persuading the government that his tractors would be of more use to them than Sweeney's mules.

== Cast ==
- Bob Burns as Sweeney Bliss
- Gladys George as Julie Bliss
- Gene Lockhart as Porgie Rowe
- Judith Barrett as Lola Pike
- William "Bill" Henry as Joel Streight
- Patricia Morison as Mrs. Allison 'Rowe' Hamilton
- E. E. Clive as Mr. Arthur
- Melville Cooper as Hearne
- William Collier, Sr. as Smith
- Lawrence Grossmith as Colonel Marchbank
- G.P. Huntley as Captain Brooks-Bowen
- Doris Lloyd as Mrs. Arthur
- Tom Dugan as Gus
- Dennie Moore as Kitty Hearne
- James Burke as Walt Bliss
- Ethel Griffies as Miss Wildhack
- Spencer Charters as Charley Shook
- Raymond Hatton as Darryl Coffee
- Charles Halton as Henry Couch

== Reception ==
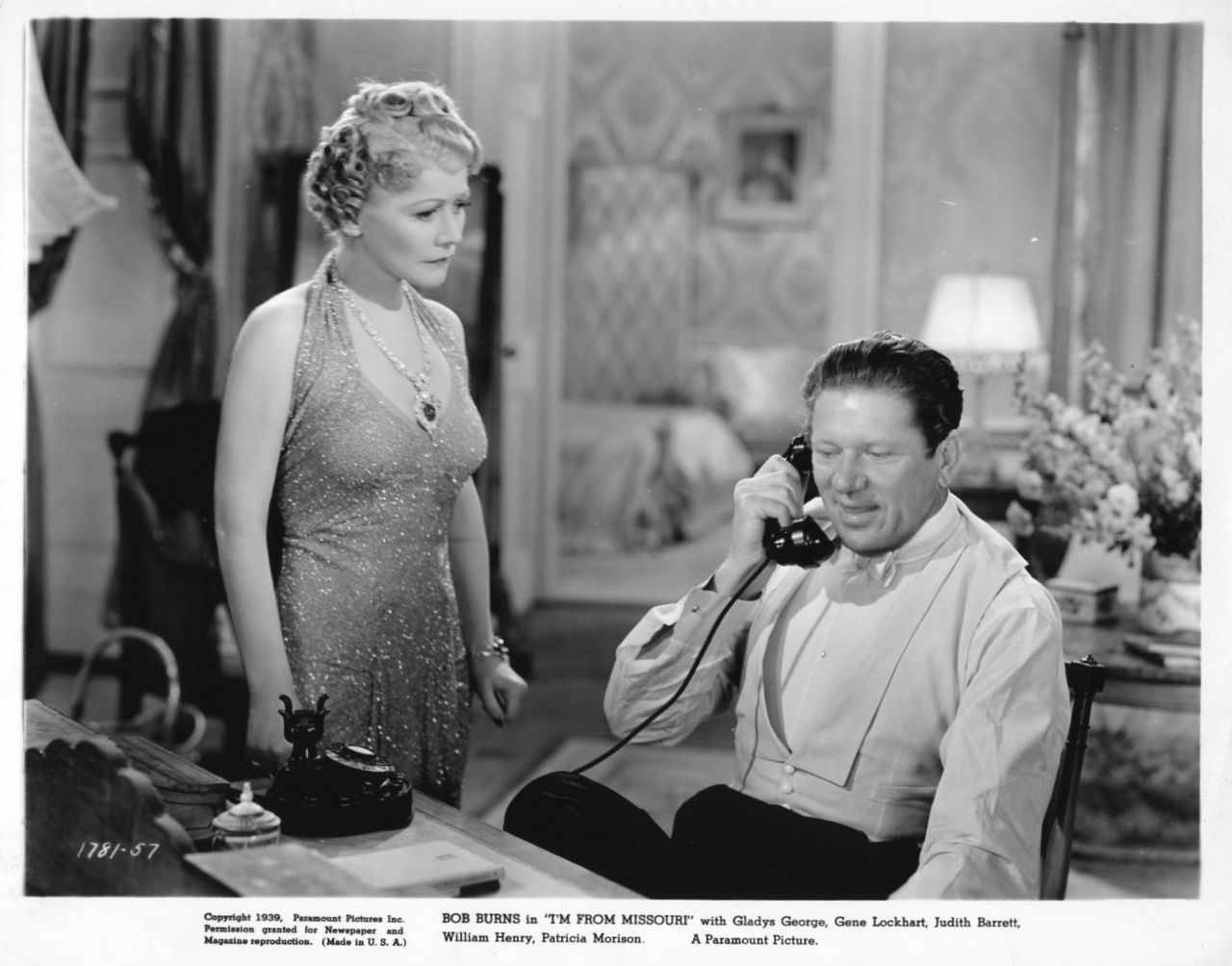
Publicity photograph of Gladys George and Bob Burns.

Frank Nugent of The New York Times said, "The too-long absence from our cinematic midst of that genial and characteristically asymmetrical map of the Southwest Territory, the physiognomy of Bob Burns, is sensibly and, in a few low-comedy high spots, inspiredly repaired by I'm From Missouri, at the Paramount. A pleasant variation on the commonplace folksiness-vs.-social-ambition theme, carried this time to the length of finally involving half the British peerage in a riotous Missouri hoe-down, the picture is a hare-brained and occasionally hilarious example of a type of Western which we can only classify as mule opera. It is also —need we emphasize? —one of the funniest of this year's crop of comedies."
