= The Man Hunter (1930 film) =

1930 film by D. Ross Lederman

- Lobby card
- Directed by: D. Ross Lederman
- Written by: Lillie Hayward (story); James A. Starr (screenplay)
- Starring: Rin Tin Tin; Nora Lane; Charles Delaney; John Litel
- Cinematography: James Van Trees
- Distributed by: Warner Bros. Pictures, Inc.
- Release date: May 5, 1930
- Running time: 6 reels (4383 ft.)
- Country: United States
- Language: English
- Budget: $66,000
- Box office: $142,000

The Man Hunter is a 1930 American pre-Code adventure drama film directed by D. Ross Lederman and starring Rin Tin Tin. The film was released by Warner Bros. Pictures, and was adapted by James A. Starr (who wrote the screenplay and dialogue) from a story by Lillie Hayward who also wrote the screenplay.

== Plot ==
Lady Jane Winston, heiress to a company called the West Africa Ivory and Rubber Co., travels to Africa because she believes that George Castle, the company's manager in Africa, is stealing from the company. Rinty sails on the same ship that she does.

When the ship arrives near Africa, Rinty jumps overboard and swims ashore. When Rinty arrives on the beach he befriends Jim Clayton, a former employee of Winston's company. As she is above to get off the ship, Winston falls into the water, as some ferocious sharks appear. Clayton and Rinty rescue her and they become friends. They decide to help Winston entrap Castle. When Clayton discovers a cache of ivory that Castle had hidden he is surprised by Castle's men and imprisoned.

Luckily, Clayton manages to give Rinty a message who delivers it to Winston. When Winston attempts to help Clayton escape, Castle kidnaps her as well. In order to escape arrest by the authorities, Castle than inspires the natives to revolt against the whites. Rinty manages to get to a British outpost just in time and the British soldiers quickly restore order, arrest Castle, and free Winston and Clayton.

== Cast ==
- Rin Tin Tin as Rinty
- Nora Lane as Lady Jane Winston
- Charles Delaney as Jim Clayton
- John Loder as George Castle
- Pat Hartigan as Crosby
- Floyd Shackelford as Simba
- Billy Bletcher as Buggs
- Joe Bordeaux as Dennis
- John Kelly as Charlie

== Box Office ==
According to Warner Bros records the film earned $108,000 domestically and $34,000 foreign.

== Preservation ==
The film is believed to be a lost film.

== See also ==
- List of lost films
