= Television Spy =

1939 film

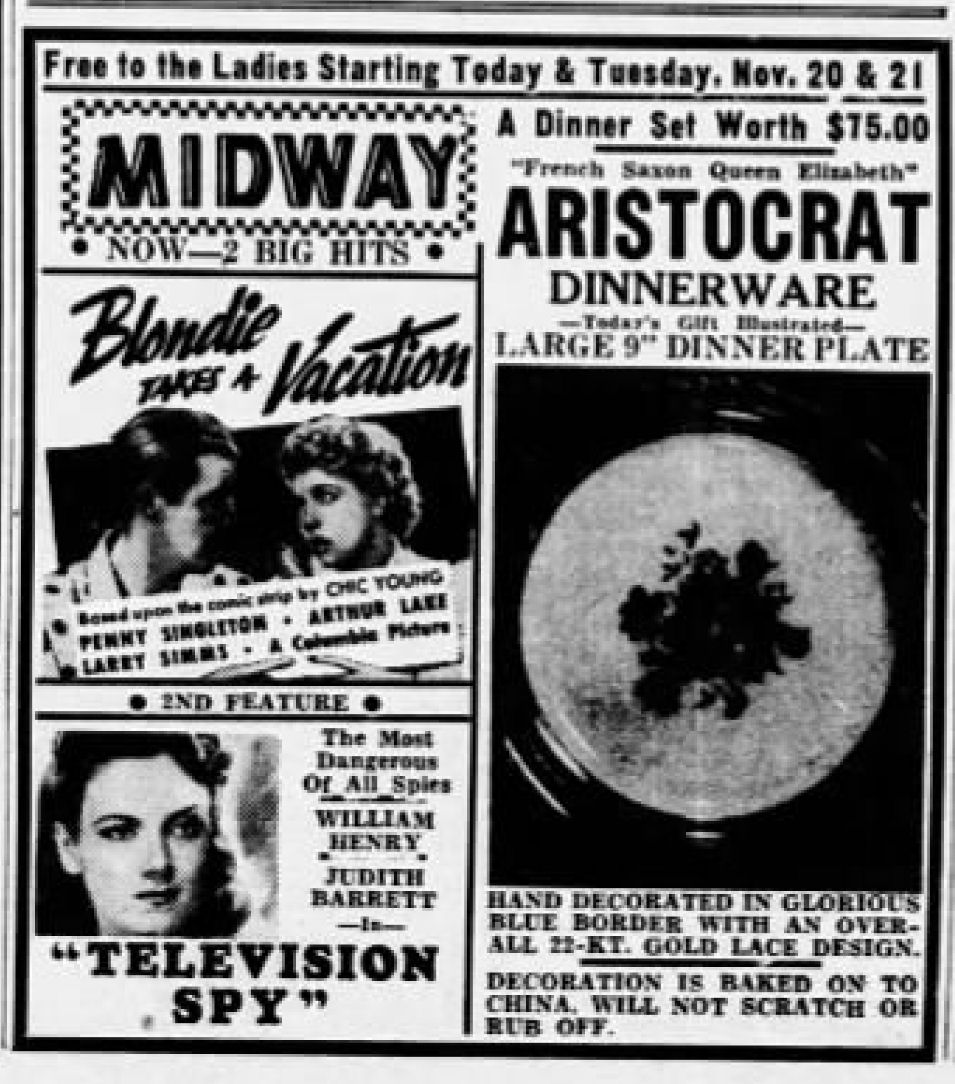
- Newspaper advertisement for Blondie Takes a Vacation (1939) and Television Spy (1939)
- Directed by: Edward Dmytryk
- Written by: Endre Bohem
- Produced by: William LeBaron; Edward T. Lowe Jr.
- Starring: William Henry
- Cinematography: Harry Fischbeck
- Edited by: Anne Bauchens
- Production company: Paramount Pictures
- Distributed by: Paramount Pictures
- Release date: October 20, 1939
- Running time: 58 minutes
- Country: United States
- Language: English

Television Spy is a 1939 American spy drama film directed by Edward Dmytryk and starring William Henry.

== Plot ==
A scientist, Douglas Cameron invents an advanced television called the Iconoscope that can send television broadcasts across the country. He is pursued by international spies who try to steal the plans for the device.

== Cast ==
- William Henry as Douglas Cameron
- Judith Barrett as Gwen Lawson
- William Collier Sr. as James Llewellyn
- Richard Denning as Dick Randolph
- John Eldredge as Boris
- Dorothy Tree as Reni Vonich
- Anthony Quinn as Forbes
- Minor Watson as Burton Lawson
- Morgan Conway as Carl Venner
- Wolfgang Zilzer as Frome
- Chester Clute as Harry Payne
- Byron Foulger as William Sheldon
- Ottola Nesmith as Caroline Sheldon
- Hilda Plowright as Amelia Sheldon
- Archie Twitchell as Jim Winton
- Olaf Hytten as Wagner, the Llewellyn butler
- Charles Lane as Adler, insurance salesman
- Eric Wilton as Edgar, Reni's Butler
