= William Henry (actor) =

American actor (1914–1982)

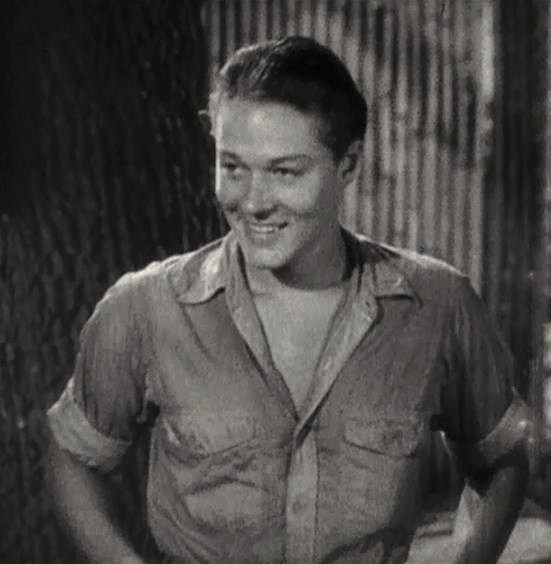
- Henry in Tarzan Escapes (1936)
- Born: November 10, 1914; Los Angeles, California, U.S.
- Died: August 10, 1982 (aged 67); Los Angeles, California, U.S.
- Occupation: Actor
- Years active: 1925–1978
- Spouses: Grace Durkin (m. 1936; div. 19??); Barbara Knudson (m. 1952; div. 1962)
- Children: 3
- Relatives: Thomas Browne Henry (brother)

William Albert Henry (November 10, 1914 – August 10, 1982) was an American actor who worked in both films and television.

== Biography ==
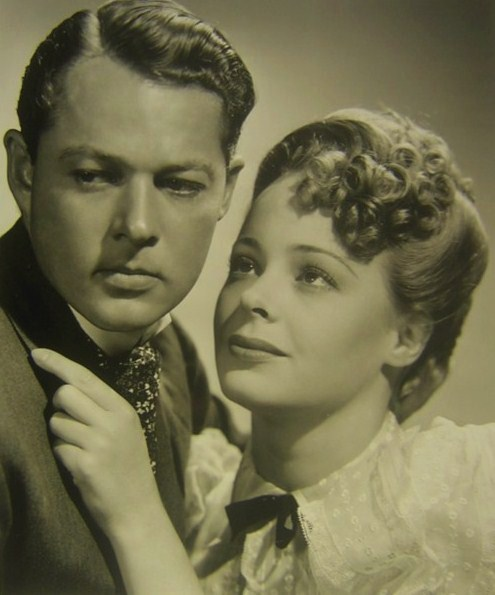
Film still of William Henry with Virginia Gilmore in Jennie (1940)

Born in Los Angeles, California, Henry started as a child actor, then was a hero in B-movies (mainly westerns), and ended his career as a character actor. He appeared in various roles on episodes of many television series. He was a member of the John Ford Stock Company and appeared twelve times for Ford. He also appeared in John Wayne's The Alamo (1960). In this version of the historical Siege of the Alamo (1836), Henry's character, Dr. Sutherland, is the last of the defenders to be killed.

Henry was active with the Pasadena Community Playhouse.

In 1952, Henry was cast as the San Francisco lawyer Lew Barry in the episode, "Self Made Man," of the syndicated television anthology series, Death Valley Days, hosted by Stanley Andrews.

Bill guest starred twice in Gene Barry's TV Western Bat Masterson, once in 1958 as crooked "Sheriff Griff Hanley" (S1E7's "A Noose Fits Anyone") and again in 1960 as stalwart "Sheriff Brady" (S2E23's "The Snare").

Henry's brother was the character actor Thomas Browne Henry.

Henry was married and twice divorced. His first marriage was to Grace Durkin, with whom he had a son, Michael, and a daughter, Michele. He and his second wife, Barbara Knudson, were the parents of William "Bill" Henry, Jr. (b. 1958).

== Selected filmography ==
- Lord Jim (1925) - Street Urchin (uncredited)
- Adorable (1933) - Minor Role (uncredited)
- Best of Enemies (1933) - College Student (uncredited)
- Coming Out Party (1934) - Party Guest (uncredited)
- The Thin Man (1934) - Gilbert Wynant
- Operator 13 (1934) - Young Lieutenant Kissing Blonde (uncredited)
- A Wicked Woman (1934) - Curtis
- China Seas (1935) - Rockwell
- Society Doctor (1935) - Frank Snowden
- The Perfect Tribute (1935) - Wounded soldier (uncredited)
- Exclusive Story (1936) - James Witherspoon Jr.
- Tarzan Escapes (1936) - Eric Parker
- Double or Nothing (1937) - Egbert Clark
- Madame X (1937) - Hugh Fariman Jr.
- Mama Runs Wild (1937) - Paul Fowler
- Four Men and a Prayer (1938) - Rodney Leigh
- Yellow Jack (1938) - Breen
- Campus Confessions (1938) - Wayne Atterbury, Jr.
- A Man to Remember (1938) - Howard Sykes
- Ambush (1939) - Charlie Hartman
- Persons in Hiding (1939) - Agent Dan Waldron
- The Arizona Wildcat (1939) - Donald Clark
- I'm from Missouri (1939) - Joel Streight
- Television Spy (1939) - Douglas Cameron
- Geronimo (1939) - Lt. John Steele, Jr.
- Emergency Squad (1940) - Peter Barton
- Parole Fixer (1940) - Scott Britton
- The Way of All Flesh (1940) - Paul Kriza Jr.
- Queen of the Mob (1940) - Bert Webster
- Cherokee Strip (1940) - Tom Cross
- Jennie (1940) - George Schermer
- Blossoms in the Dust (1941) - Allan Keats
- Dance Hall (1941) - Joe Brooks
- Scattergood Meets Broadway (1941) - David Drew
- Pardon My Stripes (1942) - Henry Platt
- Klondike Fury (1942) - Jim Armstrong
- A Gentleman After Dark (1942) - Paul Rutherford
- Stardust on the Sage (1942) - Jeff Drew
- There's One Born Every Minute (1942) - Lester Cadwalader Jr.
- Rubber Racketeers (1942) - Bill Barry
- Sweater Girl (1942) - Happy Dudley
- Calaboose (1943) - Tom Pendergrast
- I Escaped from the Gestapo (1943) - Gordon - Gestapo Agent
- Sarong Girl (1943) - Jeff Baxter
- False Faces (1943) - Don Westcott
- Alaska Highway (1943) - Steve Ormsby
- Johnny Come Lately (1943) - Pete Dougherty
- Nearly Eighteen (1943) - Jack Leonard
- Women in Bondage (1943) - Heinz Radtke
- Tornado (1943) - Bob Ramsey
- The Navy Way (1944) - Malcolm Randall
- Call of the South Seas (1944) - Agent Paul Russell
- The Lady and the Monster (1944) - Roger Collins
- Going My Way (1944) - Doctor (uncredited)
- The Adventures of Mark Twain (1944) - Charles Langdon
- Silent Partner (1944) - Jeffrey Swales
- G.I. War Brides (1946) - Capt. Roger Kirby
- The Invisible Informer (1946) - Mike Reagan
- The Mysterious Mr. Valentine (1946) - Steve Morgan
- The Fabulous Suzanne (1946) - William Harris
- Trail to San Antone (1947) - Rick Malloy
- Women in the Night (1948) - Maj. von Arnheim
- King of the Gamblers (1948) - Jerry Muller
- The Denver Kid (1948) - Tim Roberts aka Tom Richards
- Death Valley Gunfighter (1949) - Sheriff Keith Ames
- Streets of San Francisco (1949) - Nichols - Reporter
- Motor Patrol (1950) - Officer Larry Collins
- Federal Man (1950) - Agent Phil Sherrin
- David Harding, Counterspy (1950) - Sentry (uncredited)
- The Old Frontier (1950) - Doctor Tom Creighton
- Southside 1-1000 (1950) - Treasury Agent Jones
- Valentino (1951) - Cheating Husband (uncredited)
- Fury of the Congo (1951) - Ronald Cameron
- The Greatest Show on Earth (1952) - Spectator (uncredited)
- Thundering Caravans (1952) - Bert Cranston
- What Price Glory (1952) - Holsen (uncredited)
- Torpedo Alley (1952) - Instructor
- Marshal of Cedar Rock (1953) - Bill Anderson
- Savage Frontier (1953) - Deputy Dan Longley
- Canadian Mounties vs Atomic Invaders (1953, Serial) - Don Roberts
- Hollywood Thrill-Makers (1954) - Dave Wilson
- Secret of the Incas (1954) - Phillip Lang
- Masterson of Kansas (1954) - Charlie Fry
- New Orleans Uncensored (1955) - Joe Reilly
- A Bullet for Joey (1955) - Michael (uncredited)
- Jungle Moon Men (1955) - Bob Prentice
- Mister Roberts (1955) - Lt. Billings
- A Life at Stake (1955) - Myles Norman
- Paris Follies of 1956 (1955) - Wendell
- The Court-Martial of Billy Mitchell (1955) - Officer (uncredited)
- Three Bad Sisters (1956) - Bill Gans - Reporter (uncredited)
- The Wild Dakotas (1956) - Perkins (uncredited)
- Uranium Boom (1956) - Joe McGinnus
- The Harder They Fall (1956) - Fight Arena Locker Room Guard (uncredited)
- The Three Outlaws (1956) - Tall Texan
- Toward the Unknown (1956) - AP Captain (uncredited)
- Accused of Murder (1956) - Officer Walt - at Murder Scene (uncredited)
- The Wings of Eagles (1957) - Naval Aide (uncredited)
- Untamed Youth (1957) - TV Announcer (uncredited)
- Man Afraid (1957) - Reporter (uncredited)
- Spook Chasers (1957) - Harry Shelby
- The Female Animal (1958) - Delivery Man (uncredited)
- Day of the Badman (1958) - Dave Kinds (uncredited)
- Too Much, Too Soon (1958) - Henry Trent - Actor as Alexander Hamilton in Play (uncredited)
- The Lone Ranger and the Lost City of Gold (1958) - Travers
- The Last Hurrah (1958) - Votes Tallyman (uncredited)
- Gunsmoke in Tucson (1958) - Sheriff Will Blane
- The Gunfight at Dodge City (1959) - Regan Henchman (uncredited)
- The Horse Soldiers (1959) - Confederate First Lieutenant
- Sergeant Rutledge (1960) - Capt. Dwyer (uncredited)
- Seven Ways from Sundown (1960) - Hobbs Saloon Bartender (uncredited)
- The Alamo (1960) - Dr. Sutherland
- Two Rode Together (1961) - Gambler (uncredited)
- The Man Who Shot Liberty Valance (1962) - Gambler (uncredited)
- How the West Was Won (1962) - Staff Officer (uncredited)
- Showdown (1963) - Saloon Bouncer (uncredited)
- He Rides Tall (1964) - Bartender (uncredited)
- The Best Man (1964) - Reporter (uncredited)
- Cheyenne Autumn (1964) - Infantry Captain (uncredited)
- Taggart (1964) - Army Sergeant (uncredited)
- Dear Brigitte (1965) - Racetrack Cashier (uncredited)
- Gunpoint (1966) - Gang Member (uncredited)
- Texas Across the River (1966) - Settler (uncredited)
- El Dorado (1967) - Sheriff Dodd Draper (uncredited)
- Where Were You When the Lights Went Out? (1968) - Stockholder (uncredited)
- The Walls Have Eyes (1969) - Bill Turner
- Skin Game (1971) - (uncredited)

== Selected Television ==
Year	Title	Role	Notes
1952	Death Valley Days	Lew Barry	Season 1 Episode 6 "Self Made Man
1958	Bat Masterson	Sheriff Griff Hanley	Season 1 Episode 7 "A Noose Fits Anyone"
1960	Bat Masterson	Sheriff Brady	Season 2 Episode 23 "The Snare"
1960	Death Valley Days	Andrew Billings	"A Woman's Rights"
