= Road to Singapore =

1940 film by Victor Schertzinger

- Theatrical release poster
- Directed by: Victor Schertzinger
- Screenplay by: Frank Butler; Don Hartman
- Story by: Harry Hervey
- Produced by: Harlan Thompson
- Starring: Bing Crosby; Dorothy Lamour; Bob Hope
- Cinematography: William C. Mellor
- Edited by: Paul Weatherwax
- Music by: Victor Young
- Distributed by: Paramount Pictures
- Release date: March 14, 1940 (USA)
- Running time: 85 minutes
- Country: United States
- Language: English
- Box office: $1.6 million

Road to Singapore is a 1940 American musical comedy film directed by Victor Schertzinger and starring Bing Crosby, Dorothy Lamour and Bob Hope. Based on a story by Harry Hervey, the film is about two playboys trying to avoid romances on the fictional island of Kaigoon, where they meet a beautiful woman. Distributed by Paramount Pictures, the film marked the debut of the long-running and popular "Road to ..." series of pictures spotlighting the trio, seven in all. The supporting cast features Charles Coburn, Anthony Quinn, and Jerry Colonna.

== Plot ==
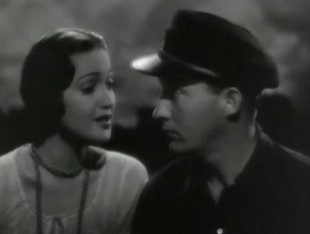
Dorothy Lamour and Bing Crosby in the trailer

Josh Mallon (Bing Crosby) and Ace Lannigan (Bob Hope) are best friends and work aboard the same ship. As their ship returns to the US after a long voyage, they see all the other sailors being mistreated by their wives and girlfriends, and the two friends pledge never to get involved with women again. Unfortunately, this vow is tested almost immediately. First, Ace is confronted by the family of a former lover, Cherry, who insist he marry her. Then Josh, who is the son of a rich shipping magnate (Charles Coburn), has to fend off his fiancée, Gloria (Judith Barrett), and his father's wishes that he settle down and take over the family business. Things get worse when Josh and Ace get caught up fishing and turn up late for a party to celebrate Josh's engagement. Gloria's hostile drunken brother starts a fistfight and a news reporter takes photographs that cause a scandal. Josh and Ace flee to Hawaii and then head for Singapore.

However, the pair only get as far as the fictional island of Kaigoon (located near Bali) before their money runs out. They rescue Mima (Dorothy Lamour), a local (but not native) woman, from her abusive dance-partner, Caesar (Anthony Quinn), and she moves into their hut. Soon Mima is running the two men's lives, much to their chagrin. The trio try to make money in several different ways, including trying to sell a spot remover that is so bad it dissolves clothes.

When Josh's father finally locates his wayward son, he and Gloria fly out to bring Josh back to face his responsibilities. The resentful Caesar leads them to where Ace, Josh and Mima are enjoying a local feast. By this point, both Josh and Ace have fallen in love with Mima. She is heartbroken to learn that Gloria is Josh's fiancée.

Ace proposes to Mima, but before she can accept, Josh returns. The two friends almost come to blows over Mima, but then decide that she should choose between them. Mima picks Ace. Josh boards an ocean liner with Gloria and his father.

Meanwhile, Caesar informs the local police that Ace is on the island illegally. Ace is arrested when he cannot produce a passport, but manages to escape. He and Mima flee aboard a ship, but Ace comes to realize that Mima really loves Josh.

When Josh's ship docks at a tropical port, a passenger complains about a terrible spot remover that disintegrated his suit jacket. Josh realizes that Ace and Mima must be on the island. When he finds them, Ace tells his best friend that Mima really loves him.

=== Running gags ===
The "Road to …" series of films had several running gags that appeared in nearly every movie. Most of these originated in Road to Singapore. These include:

- Pat-a-cake – Ace and Josh play patty-cake as a distraction before starting a fistfight that allows them to escape
- References to Bing's waistline (in this movie, Crosby himself pokes fun at his 'spare tire')
- Confidence tricks – the two main characters are usually con-men, although in this movie it is not their starting profession

== Cast ==
- Bing Crosby as Josh Mallon V
- Dorothy Lamour as Mima
- Bob Hope as Ace Lannigan
- Charles Coburn as Joshua Mallon IV
- Judith Barrett as Gloria Wycott
- Anthony Quinn as Caesar
- Jerry Colonna as Achilles Bombanassa

Uncredited cast members include

- Johnny Arthur as Timothy Willow
- Pierre Watkin as Morgan Wycott
- Gaylord Pendleton as Gordon Wycott
- Miles Mander as Sir Malcolm Drake
- Pedro Regas as Zato
- Greta Granstedt as Babe
- Edward Gargan as Bill
- John Kelly as Sailor
- Kitty Kelly as Sailor's wife
- Roger Gray as Father
- Monte Blue as High Priest
- Harry C. Bradley as Secretary
- Cyril Ring as Ship's Officer
- Richard Tucker as Ship's Officer
- Jack Pepper as Columnist
- Arthur Q. Bryan as Bartender
- Robert Emmett O'Connor as Native Immigration Officer
- Belle Mitchell as Native shopkeeper
- Fred Malatesta as Native policeman
- Elvia Allman as Homely Girl
- Bobby Barber as Man
- Devi Dja as Native girl (uncredited)

== Production ==
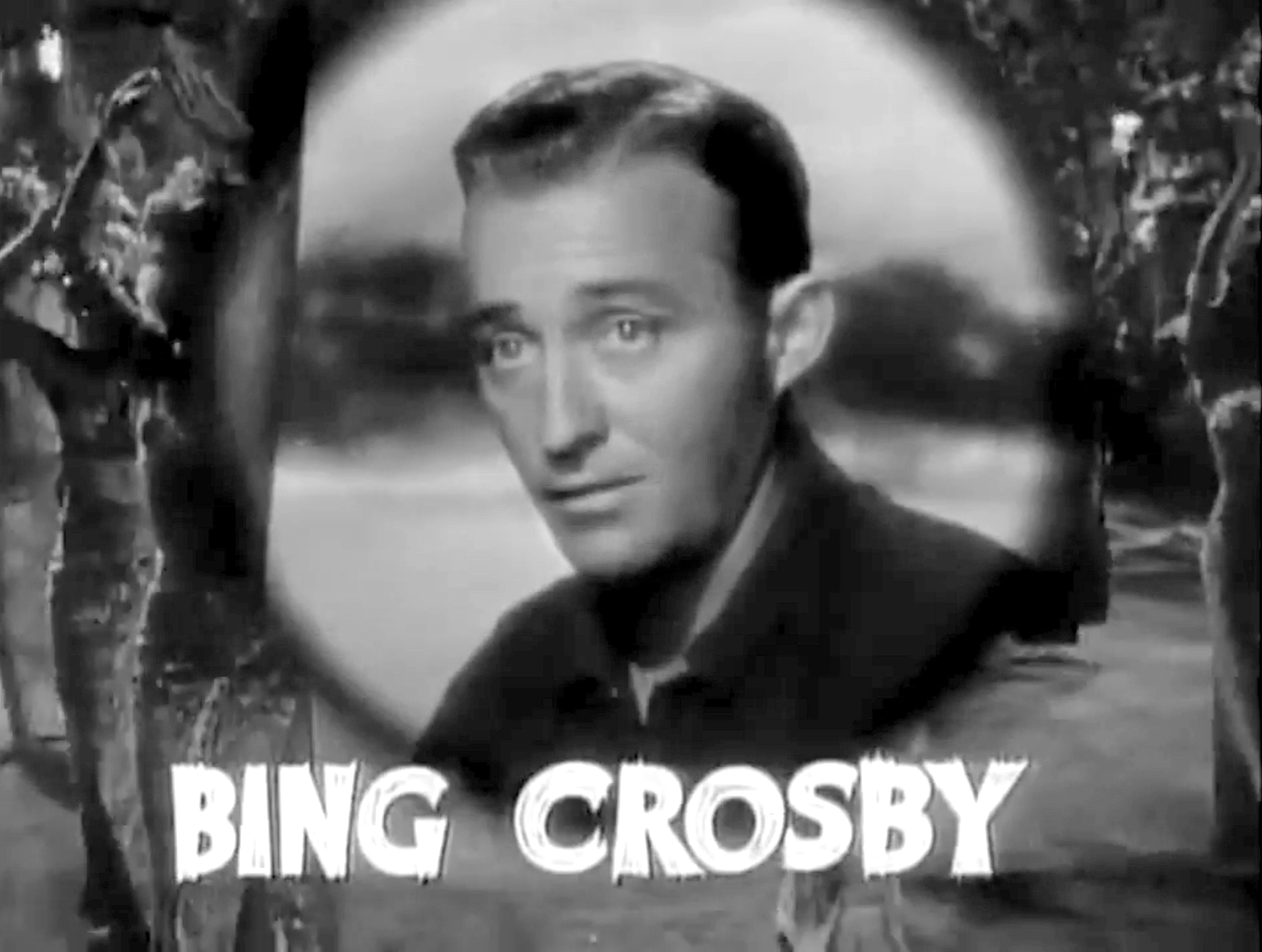

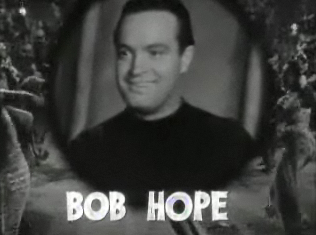

According to Hope biographer Raymond Strait, the project which became Road to Singapore was first offered to Fred MacMurray and Jack Oakie (under the working title of Road to Mandalay), and after they declined, to George Burns and Gracie Allen (as Beach of Dreams), with a second male lead to be determined. They also declined. (Burns is quoted as saying that Gracie "thought the whole thing was silly.") At this point, Paramount decided to pair Crosby with Hope, taking advantage of their friendly feud on their radio shows, and to take advantage of the screen popularity of Lamour, who had already made several lucrative pictures with a "South Seas" theme. Crosby and Hope had recently appeared live together at Del Mar (Crosby's racetrack) beforehand, amazing onlookers with how smoothly they worked together, but their audience didn't realize that they'd briefly performed together on the vaudeville stage years earlier, getting a few routines down pat.

Although the Road to Singapore script was written by established screenwriters Frank Butler and Don Hartman and directed by Victor Schertzinger, some of the material was ad libbed by Hope and Crosby or surreptitiously contributed by their own writing staffs (including Sid Kuller and Ray Golden).

Filming began in Hollywood on October 2, 1939, and continued until December. The jungle scenes were filmed at the Los Angeles County Arboretum.

This was the only installment of the series in which Hope was billed third, under Dorothy Lamour. After this picture, the billing order remained Bing Crosby, Bob Hope, and Dorothy Lamour until The Road to Hong Kong more than two decades later, in which Lamour was replaced with Joan Collins and relegated to a smaller role when Crosby insisted on a younger leading lady. Hope fought to get her into the picture, albeit in a reduced capacity.

== Reception ==
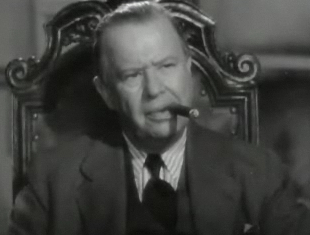
Charles Coburn in the trailer

Road to Singapore premiered March 13, 1940, at the Paramount Theatre in New York City. Tommy Dorsey's orchestra (with Frank Sinatra) highlighted the accompanying stage show.

The film was an immediate box office success, helped in large measure by good reviews and by Hope's promotion of it on his weekly radio show. The film was placed at No. 17 in the list of 1940s top-grossing movies in the United States.

A review in Variety wrote, "Much of the humor is whacky and nonsensical, but made palatable in the manner of presentation by the Crosby-Hope team and crackerjack direction of Victor Schertizinger." Harrison's Reports wrote that the story made "little sense", but that this "does not matter much, for the entertaining qualities of the picture are the gags, the songs, and the clowning on the part of Bing Crosby and Bob Hope", who were called "excellent as a team." Film Daily agreed, reporting that "Bing and Bob make up a swell team, with a resulting heavy bundle of laughs." John Mosher of The New Yorker found the film trivial but wrote that it "saunters along as easily as any of the collection" of comedies playing that week. Frank S. Nugent of The New York Times wrote a dissenting negative review, saying the film squandered its possibilities. He metaphorically called the road "cobbled with good intentions", but "altogether too uneven for regular use."

== Soundtrack ==
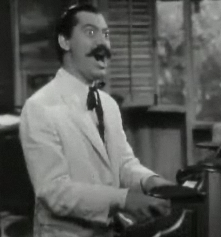
Jerry Collona in the film

- "Captain Custard" (Johnny Burke and Victor Schertzinger) by Bob Hope and Bing Crosby
- "The Moon and the Willow Tree" (Burke and Schertzinger) by Dorothy Lamour
- "Sweet Potato Piper" (Burke and James V. Monaco) by Bing Crosby, Dorothy Lamour, and Bob Hope
- "Too Romantic" (Burke and Monaco) by Bing Crosby and Dorothy Lamour
- "Kaigoon" (Burke and Monaco) by the chorus (with Esperanto lyrics)

Bing Crosby recorded three of the songs for Decca Records. "Too Romantic" was a big hit reaching the No. 3 position in the charts during a 12-week stay. "Sweet Potato Piper" also reached the top 20. Crosby's songs were also included in the Bing's Hollywood series.
