= Polo Joe =

1936 film by William C. McGann

- Theatrical release poster
- Directed by: William C. McGann
- Written by: Hugh Cummings; Peter Milne; Richard Macaulay
- Produced by: Bryan Foy
- Starring: Joe E. Brown; Carol Hughes; Richard 'Skeets' Gallagher
- Cinematography: L. William O'Connell
- Edited by: Clarence Kolster
- Music by: Howard Jackson
- Production company: Warner Bros. Pictures
- Distributed by: Warner Bros. Pictures
- Release date: December 8, 1936
- Running time: 65 minutes
- Country: United States
- Language: English

Polo Joe is a 1936 American comedy film directed by William C. McGann and starring Joe E. Brown, Carol Hughes and Richard 'Skeets' Gallagher.

It was Brown's final film for Warner Bros. Pictures before he left the studio to make films for producer David L. Loew. This move did serious damage to his career.

== Plot ==
A man who, despite his fear of horses, takes up polo to impress a woman.

== Cast ==
- Joe E. Brown as Joe Bolton
- Carol Hughes as Mary Hilton
- Richard 'Skeets' Gallagher as Haywood
- Joe King as Colonel Hilton
- Wild Bill Elliott as Don Trumbeau
- Fay Holden as Aunt Minnie
- George E. Stone as First Loafer
- Olive Tell as Mrs. Hilton
- David Newell as Jack Hilton
- Milton Kibbee as Marker
- Frank Orth as Bert
- John Kelly as Rusty
- Sam McDaniel as Harvey
- Charley Foy as Second Loafer

== Bibliography ==
- Wes D. Gehring. Joe E. Brown: Film Comedian and Baseball Buffoon. McFarland, 2006.
