= Morgan Conway =

American actor (1900–1981)

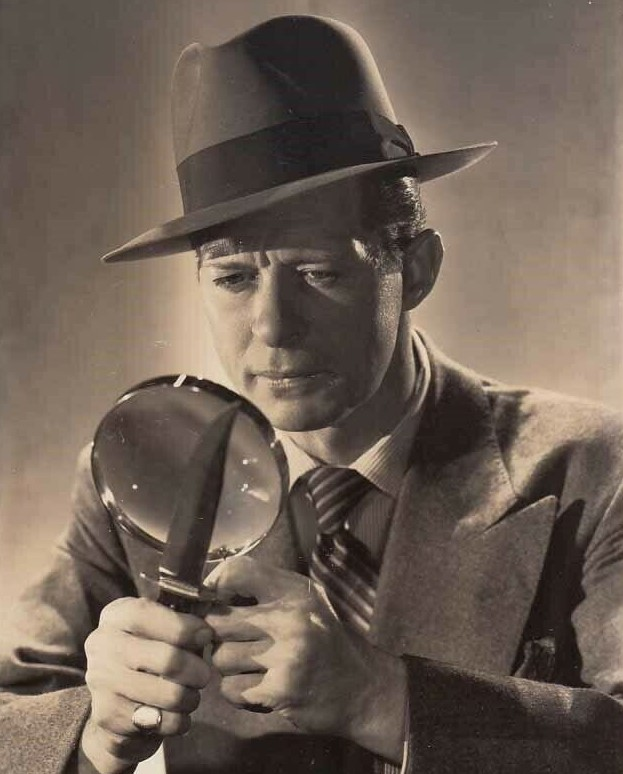
- Conway in Dick Tracy (1945)
- Born: Sydney Albert Conway; March 16, 1900; Newark, New Jersey, U.S.
- Died: November 16, 1981 (aged 81); New Jersey, U.S.
- Occupation: Actor
- Years active: 1934–1946
- Spouse(s): Lilian Conway (m. 1946–1981); Aurelia Fitzpatrick Carr (m. 1926–1929) (1 son)
- Children: 1

Morgan Conway (born Sydney Albert Conway, March 16, 1900 – November 16, 1981) was an American actor, best known for his portrayals of Dick Tracy.

== Early life and career ==
Conway was born in Newark, New Jersey, in 1900, the fifth of six children of Sydney Vincent Conway and Margaret McConnell Conway, both born in the U.S. of Irish Catholic ancestry. He worked in commercial real estate with his brokerage in New York City for 11 years before closing it in 1933 during the Great Depression. Some serendipitous connections got him onto the New York stage as an actor, followed by his venture west to Hollywood, where he began acting in little theatre and landed his first film role, in the 1934 picture starring Spencer Tracy, Looking for Trouble.

Returning to New York, Conway acted on Broadway in plays that included Angel Island (1937), In the Bag (1937), Mimie Scheller (1936), Summer Wives (1936), and If a Body (1935).

For many years he freelanced, working for various Hollywood studios in bits or supporting roles. His most familiar appearance from this period is probably in Charlie Chan in Reno (1939).

Morgan Conway did belong to the Screen Actors Guild but he was not, as has been reported, one of its founders. His name was confused with that of founder and character actor Morgan Wallace.

== RKO Radio Pictures and portrayal of Dick Tracy ==
By the mid-1940s he was a contract player for RKO Radio Pictures, and he was chosen to portray Chester Gould's comic-strip detective Dick Tracy in a new series of feature films. RKO's earliest publicity photos posed Conway in profile, hoping to emulate Gould's square-jawed caricatures. Conway's low-key interpretation of the character, calm and businesslike, was entirely in keeping with a police procedural. Conway was well received by the press; the trade publication Showmen's Trade Review reported, "It is Conway's splendid interpretation of Dick Tracy that makes this film such good entertainment and a very auspicious first in the series." Dick Tracy writer Max Allan Collins strongly approves of his performances: "To the late Morgan Conway, wherever you are, a tip of the fedora. You did very, very well." Conway's two Dick Tracy features are Dick Tracy (1945, retitled Dick Tracy, Detective for TV syndication and video) and Dick Tracy vs. Cueball (1946).

Actor Ralph Byrd had played the role in four hit serials, and some exhibitors petitioned RKO to make more Tracy features, but with Byrd. RKO made the substitution, reassigning Conway to three other "B" features. The studio discontinued most of its "B" product in 1947 and Conway's contract was not renewed. In 1948, Chester Gould proposed that RKO should continue the series, stipulating that Morgan Conway should play the lead, but RKO (then in organizational turmoil after the studio's sale to Howard Hughes) declined.

== Other projects ==
In March 1948, Conway announced plans to launch an independent production company, intending to make one film per year; he already had two scripts in mind, titled "Condemned" and "The Twins." He kept the idea alive through the next year and tried to secure financing, but the plans fell through. Also in March 1948, Conway received some negative publicity that he was quick to correct. According to one report, "Morgan Conway was upset when itemed as being in the company of a star whose after-dark drinking bouts disgrace the whole town regularly. Conway is a happily married man, never smokes or drinks on the screen because of his kid following, and never visits bars." (In newspaper reports, Morgan Conway was sometimes mistaken for fellow RKO actor Tom Conway; this may have been the source of the confusion.)

Morgan Conway was considered for the leading role in a film biography of New York mayor Jimmy Walker, to be produced by Gene Fowler, but the project was abandoned. Conway then decided to give up his movie career completely. He felt that he had become stereotyped as Dick Tracy, just as Ralph Byrd had. "I had to do it," he said. "People began to stop thinking of me as Morgan Conway. All they could seem to remember was that I was Dick Tracy in the movies."

In 1948 Conway became a goodwill ambassador to Mexico, presenting a patriotic American film, Of This We Are Proud, to the Mexican consul for showing to schoolchildren. He was decorated for his efforts by Grupa America of Mexico.

Morgan Conway left Hollywood in 1949, but his "Dick Tracy" past came back to haunt him: "The man who plays Dick Tracy in the movies paid a $4 fine in Mid-Manhattan Court yesterday after pleading guilty to permitting his dog, also named Dick Tracy, to be unleashed in Central Park."

== Personal life ==
Conway and his second wife Lilian Anna Conway (née Karp), whom he married in 1946, returned to New Jersey, where he resumed working in commercial real estate, and a limited amount of acting on stage.

Conway had previously been married to Aurelia Blassingame Fitzpatrick (whose grandfather Benjamin Fitzpatrick had been governor of Alabama and a U.S. senator). She was the mother of Conway's only child, Ben Fitzpatrick Conway.

To family and friends, Conway was known as Syd. Syd and Ben, and later Ben's wife and children, shared quality time in the late 1940s and early 1950s after Ben returned to New York from his military service in post-war Japan. It is notable that from the early 1960s to early 1990s, Ben was a prominent literary agent in Hollywood, helping launch a number of writing and directing careers in the same industry in which his father had worked.

Morgan Conway died of lung cancer in 1981, at the age of 81. He was survived by his wife Lilian (who died in 1995).

== Partial filmography ==
- Looking for Trouble (1934) as Dan Sutter
- Happy Landing (1934) as Frank Harland
- The Nurse from Brooklyn (1938) as Inspector Donohue
- Sinners in Paradise (1938) as Harrison Brand
- Crime Ring (1938) as Ray Taylor
- Illegal Traffic (1938) as State's Attorney Ryan
- Smashing the Spy Ring (1938) as Professor Leonard (uncredited)
- Off the Record (1939) as Lou Baronette
- North of Shanghai (1939) as Bob Laird
- Blackwell's Island (1939) as Steve Cardigan
- Wings of the Navy (1939) as Tommy – Duty Officer (uncredited)
- Secret Service of the Air (1939) as Edward P. Powell
- The Kid from Kokomo (1939) as Louie
- Charlie Chan in Reno (1939) as George Bentley
- Grand Jury Secrets (1939) as Thomas Reedy
- The Spellbinder (1939) as Mr. Carrington
- Television Spy (1939) as Carl Venner
- Sued for Libel (1939) as Albert Pomeroy
- Private Detective (1939) as Nat Flavin
- 3 Cheers for the Irish (1940) as Joe Niklas
- The Saint Takes Over (1940) as Sam Reese
- Florian (1940) as Kingston (uncredited)
- Brother Orchid (1940) as Philadelphia Powell
- A Fugitive from Justice (1940) as 'Julie' Alexander
- Millionaires in Prison (1940) as James Brent
- Sing Your Worries Away (1942) as Chesty Martin (uncredited)
- A Desperate Chance for Ellery Queen (1942) as Ray Stafford
- Bells of Capistrano (1942) as Stag Johnson
- Tornado (1943) as Gary Linden
- Jack London (1943) as Richard Harding Davis
- Canyon City (1943) as Craig Morgan
- Dick Tracy (1945) as Dick Tracy
- The Truth About Murder (1946) as Dist. Atty. Lester Ashton
- Badman's Territory as (1946) Marshall Bill Hampton
- Dick Tracy vs. Cueball (1946) as Dick Tracy
- Vacation in Reno (1946) as Joe (final film role)
