= Dick Tracy (1945 film) =

1945 American pulp action film

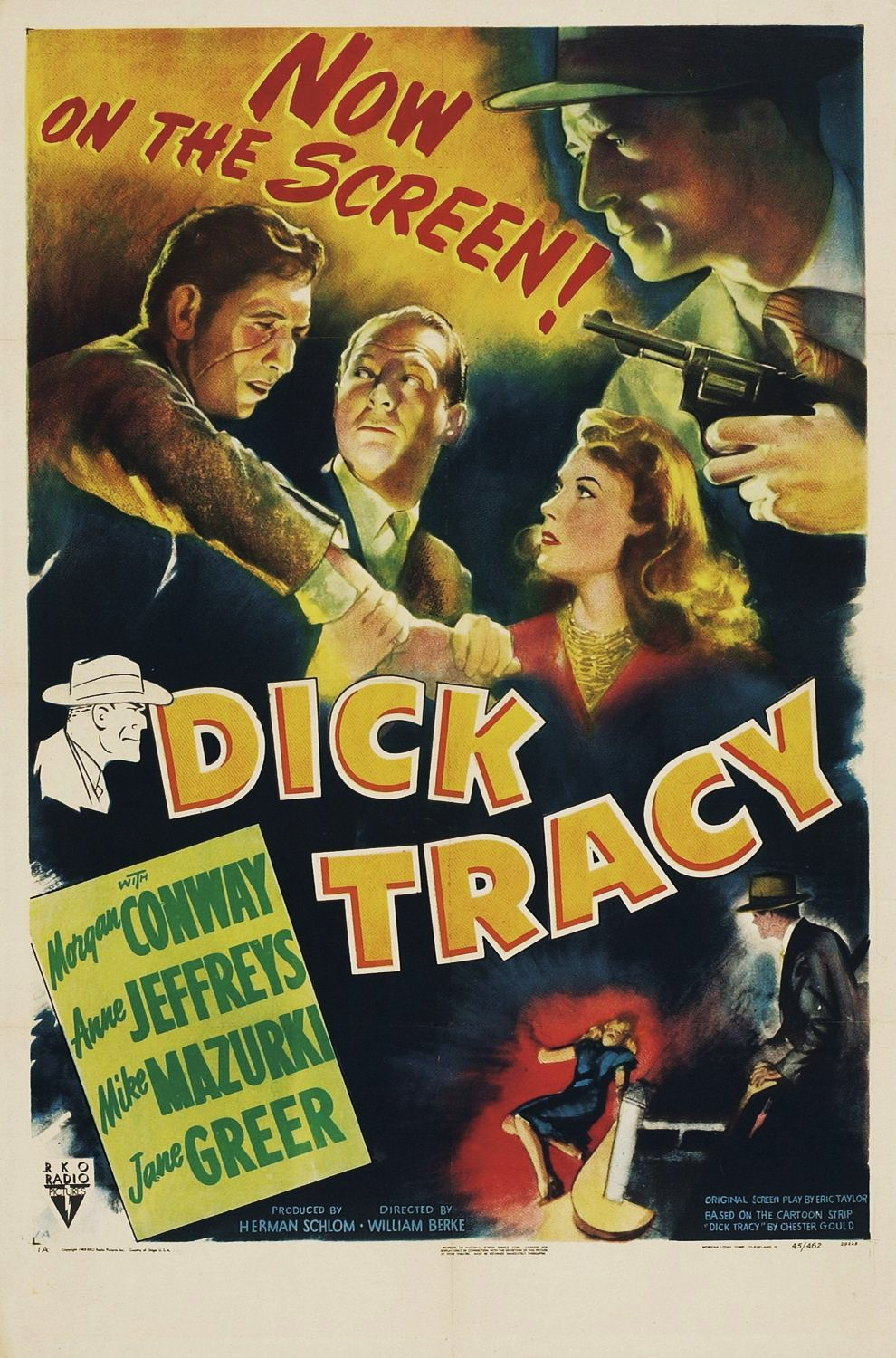
- Theatrical poster
- Directed by: William A. Berke
- Screenplay by: Eric Taylor
- Based on: Dick Tracy by Chester Gould
- Produced by: Herman Schlom
- Starring: Morgan Conway; Anne Jeffreys; Mike Mazurki
- Cinematography: Frank Redman
- Edited by: Ernie Leadlay
- Music by: Roy Webb
- Production company: RKO Radio Pictures
- Distributed by: RKO Radio Pictures
- Release dates: December 20, 1945 (New York City); December 21, 1946 (U.S.)
- Running time: 61 minutes
- Country: United States
- Language: English

Dick Tracy (also known as Dick Tracy, Detective) is a 1945 American action film based on the comic strip of the same name created by Chester Gould. Released by RKO Radio Pictures, it is the first of four installments in the studio's Dick Tracy film series.

== Plot ==
Police detective Dick Tracy investigates a series of murders in which victims from different social and economic backgrounds are slashed to death by a killer known as Splitface. While searching for a common link between the victims, Tracy encounters rooftop astronomer Linwood J. Starling near the second murder scene. Suspecting Starling withheld information, police arrest him, though his evasive behavior frustrates interrogators.

A knife recovered from a crime scene is traced to the funeral parlor of mortician Deathridge, whose supply room is easily accessible. Tracy leaves to follow a lead at The Paradise Club with his girlfriend, Tess Trueheart, posing as his cover, but returns to find Deathridge murdered.

Meanwhile, the city's mayor receives death threats despite having no obvious connection to the other victims. Under Tracy's questioning, the mayor recalls serving on a jury years earlier that convicted Alexis Banning of fatally stabbing his girlfriend. Tracy issues an all-points bulletin for Banning.

After being released on a writ, Starling is revealed to be Splitface's silent partner. When Splitface discovers that Starling has been sending independent extortion notes for extra money, he kills Starling by throwing him through a skylight. Splitface then kidnaps Tess from Tracy's rooming house to use as leverage. Junior Tracy tails the getaway car and leaves a trail for the police, allowing Tracy to track them down, defeat Splitface in a fistfight, and rescue Tess.

== Cast ==
- Morgan Conway as Dick Tracy
- Anne Jeffreys as Tess Trueheart
- Mike Mazurki as Alexis "Splitface" Banning
- Jane Greer as Judith Owens
- Lyle Latell as Pat Patton
- Joseph Crehan as Chief Brandon
- Mickey Kuhn as Junior
- Trevor Bardette as Prof. Linwood J. Starling
- Morgan Wallace as Steve Owens
- Milton Parsons as Deathridge the Undertaker
- William Halligan as the Mayor
- Jason Robards Sr. as Motorist (uncredited)

== Production ==
Getting the rights to produce Dick Tracy from the character's creator, Chester Gould, cost RKO pictures $10,000. This was the first in a series of Dick Tracy films produced by RKO.
