= Big Business Girl =

1931 film by William A. Seiter

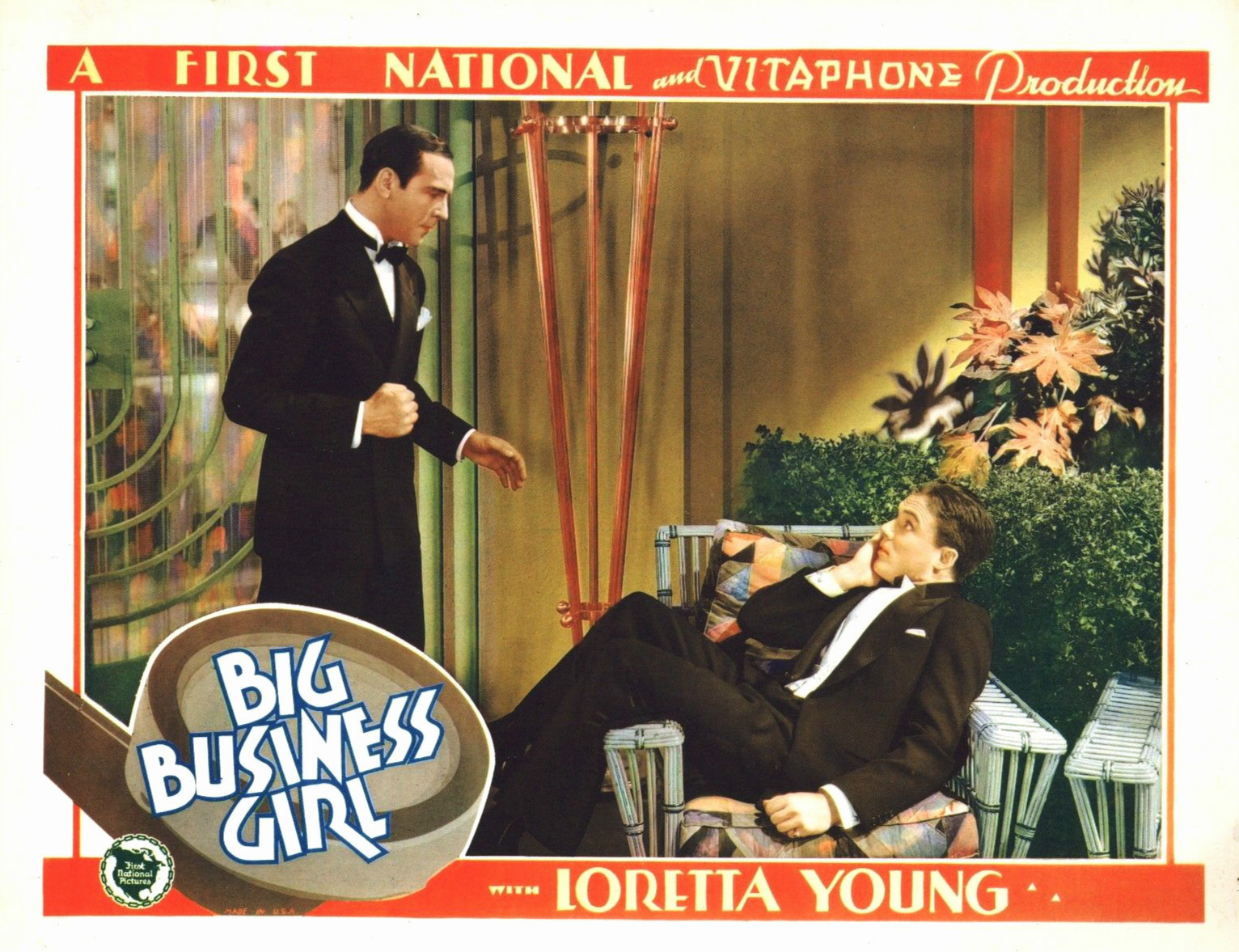
- Lobby card
- Directed by: William A. Seiter
- Written by: Robert Lord (screen adaptation)
- Based on: Big Business Girl in College Humor by Patricia Reilly; H. N. Swanson
- Starring: Loretta Young; Joan Blondell
- Cinematography: Sol Polito
- Edited by: Pete Fritch
- Music by: Leo F. Forbstein
- Production company: First National Pictures
- Distributed by: Warner Bros. Pictures
- Release date: June 12, 1931
- Running time: 75 minutes
- Country: United States
- Language: English

Big Business Girl is a 1931 American pre-Code First National sound comedy film directed by William A. Seiter and starring Loretta Young, then eighteen years old. It was released theatrically through First National's parent company Warner Bros. Pictures.

== Plot ==
College graduate Claire McIntyre puts off a trip to Paris with her new husband, jazz band leader Johnny Saunders to try to build a career and life in the big city. Though she initially struggles to find work, Claire soon lands a job and catches the eye of ad executive Robert Clayton. Claire impresses her bosses with her advertising copy and earns a big promotion, though she faces constant sexual harassment from Clayton. When Johnny returns from his trip and hopes to rekindle their relationship, he and Claire find themselves at odds and she must decide whether she wants to reconcile with him and quit her job or continue to pursue her career.

== Cast ==
- Loretta Young as Claire McIntyre
- Frank Albertson as Johnny Saunders
- Ricardo Cortez as Robert J. Clayton
- Joan Blondell as Pearl
- Frank Darien as Luke Winters
- Dorothy Christy as Mrs. Emery
- Oscar Apfel as Walter Morley
- Nancy Dover as Sarah Ellen
- Mickey Bennett as Joe
- Bobby Gordon as Messenger boy
- Virginia Sale as Sally Curtis
- George 'Gabby' Hayes as Hotel Clerk

== Preservation status ==
A copy is preserved at the Library of Congress.

== Home media ==
The film was released on VHS as part of the 'Forbidden Hollywood' series by MGM/UA Home Video, and later on Region 1 DVD by Warner Archive.
