= Tess Trueheart =

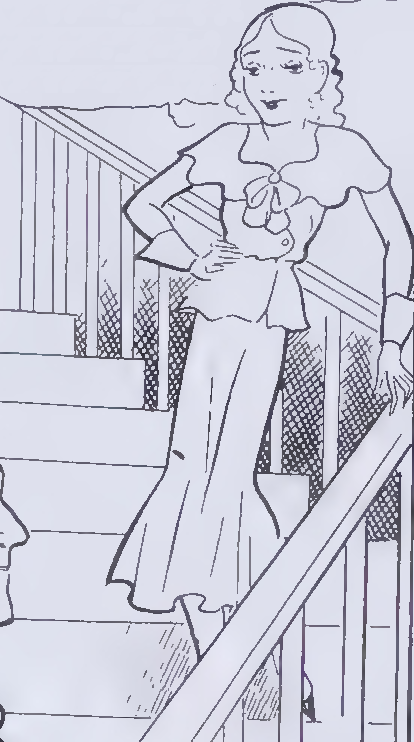
- Illustration of Tess Trueheart by Chester Gould from the Dick Tracy strip, October 129, 1931

Publication information
- Publisher: Tribune Media Services
- First appearance: 1931
- Created by: Chester Gould

In-story information
- Supporting character of: Dick Tracy

Tess Trueheart is the love interest character in the American comic strip Dick Tracy, which was created by Chester Gould in 1931.

The character eventually became the wife of Dick Tracy in the original comic strip.

In the 1934-1948 Dick Tracy radio series, she was voiced by Helen Lewis.

The character of Tess Trueheart has been featured in films, including 1945's Dick Tracy and its sequel Dick Tracy vs. Cueball, portrayed in both by actress Anne Jeffreys, and in 1990's Dick Tracy, which starred Glenne Headly as Tess.
