= Barbara Knudson =

American actress

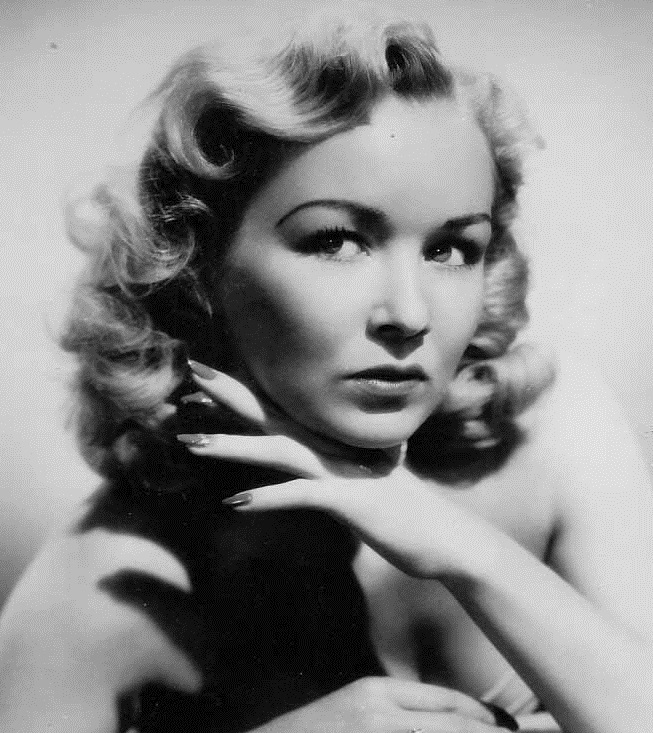
- Knudson in 1954
- Born: Barbara Ann Knudson; December 4, 1927; Las Vegas, Nevada, U.S.
- Died: May 11, 2014 (aged 86); Las Vegas, Nevada, U.S.
- Occupation: Actress
- Years active: 1950–1978
- Spouse: William Henry (m. 1952; div. 1962)
- Children: 1

Barbara Ann Knudson (December 4, 1927 – May 11, 2014) was an American film and television actress with more than forty professional credits, including starring roles in Meet Danny Wilson in 1952, The Cry Baby Killer in 1958 and in 1956 she appeared in an episode of The Lone Ranger and The Jayhawkers! in 1959.

Knudson was born in Las Vegas, Nevada, on December 4, 1927, to K.O. and Beatrice Knudson. She graduated from Las Vegas High School. She met her future husband, William "Bill" Henry, while she was performing for the Las Vegas Little Theatre at the Last Frontier Hotel. Henry asked her to appear at the Pasadena Playhouse, where she was spotted by talent scouts.

Knudson signed with Paramount Studios in January 1950, which she chose over 20th Century Fox. Her early roles, including a small part in a party scene in a Rock Hudson film, led to a further contract with Universal-International. She married Bill Henry at a wedding ceremony on Waikiki in 1952. Prominent guests included Jack Lemmon and John Ford. The couple had one son, William "Bill" Henry Jr., in 1958. Their marriage ended in divorce in 1962.

She co-starred in the 1952 film, Meet Danny Wilson, and appeared in two episodes of The Lone Ranger in 1956 and an episode of New Comedy Showcase in 1960.

== Death ==
Knudson died from natural causes at her home in Nevada on May 11, 2014, aged 86.
