= Albert Lewis (producer) =

American film producer

- Lewis on the set of The Show-Off in 1946
- Born: 15 March 1884; Kolno, Poland, Russian Empire
- Died: 5 April 1978 (aged 94); Beverly Hills, California, USA
- Citizenship: American
- Occupations: Stage and film producer
- Known for: Ready for Love

Albert E. Lewis (15 March 1884 – 5 April 1978) was a Polish-born Broadway and film producer. His family emigrated to the Lower East Side of Manhattan, New York when he was a boy. He became a vaudeville comedian, then started a partnership producing one-act plays for vaudeville. Around 1930 he moved to Hollywood and worked as a film producer with Paramount, RKO, and MGM until after World War II.

== Early years ==
Albert E. Lewis was born on 15 March 1884 in Kolno, Poland, then part of the Russian Empire. (Note: Lewis's year of birth is sometimes given as 1885. Generally reliable sources give it as 1884. One plausible source gives the year as 1889.) His parents were Nathan and Ida Lewis. The family was Jewish. They settled in Manhattan's Lower East Side. Albert E. Lewis attended public high school in New York City. He was an actor from 1909 to 1913. He would perform "Dutch" comedy skits in vaudeville shows.

In 1913 he became a member of the firm "Lewis & Gordon". His partner, Max Gordon, was also from a Lower East Side family of Polish Jewish immigrants and had also performed a "Dutch" act in vaudeville. Their booking and production agency became known for creating high-quality single-act plays for inclusion in vaudeville programs, such as Eugene O'Neill's In the Zone. This partnership produced the plays Welcome Stranger, Six Cylinder Love, The Nervous Wreck, Rain, Easy Come, Easy Go, Secrets and The Spider. In 1925 Lewis produced and directed the original Broadway production of The Jazz Singer, starring George Jessel. The Jazz Singer opened at the Fulton Theatre on 14 September 1925 and ran for 315 performances. It was the basis for the breakthrough talking picture The Jazz Singer (1927) starring Al Jolson.

== Film producer ==
Lewis was New York representative of Fox Film Corporation from 1922 to 1929. By the late 1920s, vaudeville was dying, and the Lewis & Gordon partnership was dissolved. Lewis moved to Hollywood to work for William Fox, who had once partnered with Max's brother Cliff Gordon in vaudeville acts. From 1930 to 1931, he was head of the story department at the Fox studio. In September 1932, he joined the production staff of Paramount in Hollywood. He was made an associate producer. He produced Torch Singer in 1933.]

In 1934 Lewis produced Ready for Love (1934) for Paramount Pictures. The film was directed by Marion Gering and starred Richard Arlen, Ida Lupino, Marjorie Rambeau and Trent Durkin. He produced Come on Marines the same year, directed by Henry Hathaway, also starring Arlen and Lupino. In 1937 Lewis produced Fight for Your Lady for RKO. The comedy was directed by Ben Stoloff, and starred John Boles, Jack Oakie, and Ida Lupino. Frank Nugent of The New York Times called the film "a fumbling, unoriginal and infantile farce [which] comes unpleasantly close to being the composite year's worst picture. In 1942 Lewis and George Balanchine co-produced and co-directed Cabin in the Sky, a Broadway musical with an all-black cast. Lewis was an associate producer of the film version directed by Vincente Minnelli that was released in 1943. He was assigned to give Minnelli technical advice since this was the first film he was directing. Lewis also helped with casting for the film, which was seen as a prestigious opportunity for black actors.

== Later career ==
Lewis' eldest son Arthur Lewis (1916–2006), collaborated with his father on the screenplay for Oh You Beautiful Doll (1949) and on the story for Golden Girl (1951). George Jessel, who had starred in The Jazz Singer, produced these two films. In 1952 Albert and Arthur Lewis produced the Broadway musical Three Wishes for Jamie. Arthur Lewis went on to a distinguished career producing film, TV, and stage shows. Albert Lewis died on 5 April 1978 in Beverly Hills, California. He was aged 93.

== Filmography ==
Lewis produced the following films:

- 1932 No Man of Her Own (uncredited): Paramount, directed by Wesley Ruggles, starring Clark Gable and Carole Lombard
- 1933 Torch Singer (uncredited): Paramount, directed by Alexander Hall and George Somnes, starring Claudette Colbert, Ricardo Cortez, David Manners
- 1934 Come On, Marines!: Paramount, directed by Henry Hathaway, starring Richard Arlen, Ida Lupino
- 1934 One Hour Late: Paramount, directed by Ralph Murphy, starring Joe Morrison, Helen Twelvetrees
- 1934 Shoot the Works: Paramount, directed by Wesley Ruggles, starring Jack Oakie, Ben Bernie and band, Dorothy Dell
- 1934 Ready for Love: Paramount, directed by Marion Gering, starring Richard Arlen, Ida Lupino
- 1935 College Scandal: Paramount, directed by Elliott Nugent, starring Arline Judge, Kent Taylor
- 1935 Men Without Names: Paramount, directed by Ralph Murphy, starring Fred MacMurray, Madge Evans, David Holt
- 1935 Stolen Harmony: Paramount, directed by Alfred L. Werker, starring George Raft and Ben Bernie
- 1935 The Gilded Lily: Paramount, directed by Wesley Ruggles, starring Claudette Colbert, Fred MacMurray, Ray Milland
- 1936 Florida Special: Paramount, directed by Ralph Murphy, starring Jack Oakie, Sally Eilers, Kent Taylor
- 1936 My American Wife: Paramount, directed by Harold Young, starring Francis Lederer, Ann Sothern, Fred Stone
- 1936 Till We Meet Again: Paramount, directed by Robert Florey, starring Gertrude Michael and Herbert Marshall
- 1937 Fight for Your Lady: RKO, directed by Ben Stoloff, starring John Boles, Jack Oakie, Ida Lupino
- 1937 She's Got Everything: RKO, directed by Joseph Santley, starring Gene Raymond, Ann Sothern, Victor Moore
- 1937 The Woman I Love:RKO Radio, directed by Anatole Litvak, starring Paul Muni, Miriam Hopkins, and Louis Hayward
- 1937 There Goes the Groom: RKO, directed by Joseph Santley, starring Ann Sothern, Burgess Meredith, Mary Boland
- 1940 Remember the Night (uncredited): Paramount, directed by Mitchell Leisen, starring Barbara Stanwyck, Fred MacMurray
- 1943 Cabin in the Sky (associate producer): MGM, directed by Vincente Minnelli, starring Ethel Waters, Eddie "Rochester" Anderson, Lena Horne etc.
- 1946 The Show-Off: MGM, directed by Harry Beaumont, starring Red Skelton, Marilyn Maxwell, Marjorie Main
- 1947 Merton of the Movies: MGM, directed by Robert Alton, starring Red Skelton, Virginia O'Brien, Gloria Grahame
