= Somnes =

Somnes may refer to:

- George Somnes (1887–1956), American theatre and film director
- Johan Sömnes, Swedish actor in Let the Right One In
- Sømnes, Norway, a Norwegian coastal village in Nord-Trøndelag
