= Helen Bonfils =

American actress, theatrical producer, publisher, and philanthropist (1889–1972)

- Born: Helen Gilmer Bonfils; November 16, 1889; Peekskill, New York, US
- Died: June 6, 1972 (aged 82); Denver, Colorado, US
- Resting place: Fairmount Mausoleum (Denver, Colorado)
- Occupations: Actress, theatrical producer, newspaper executive, philanthropist
- Spouses: George Somnes (m. 1936): Edward Michael Davis
- Parent(s): Frederick Gilmer Bonfils; Belle Barton Bonfils
- Relatives: May Bonfils Stanton, sister
- Awards: Colorado Women's Hall of Fame (1985); Colorado Performing Arts Hall of Fame (1999)

Helen Gilmer Bonfils (November 16, 1889 – June 6, 1972) was an American heiress, actress, theatrical producer, newspaper executive, and philanthropist. She acted in local theatre in Denver, Colorado, and on Broadway, and also co-produced plays in Denver, New York City, and London. She succeeded her father, Frederick Gilmer Bonfils, as manager of The Denver Post in 1933, and eventually became president of the company. Lacking heirs, she invested her fortune into providing for the city of Denver and the state of Colorado, supporting the Belle Bonfils Blood Bank, the Bonfils Memorial Theatre, the University of Denver, the Denver Zoo, the Dumb Friends League, churches, and synagogues. Her estate endowed the Denver Center for the Performing Arts. She was posthumously inducted into the Colorado Women's Hall of Fame in 1985 and the Colorado Performing Arts Hall of Fame in 1999.

== Early life and family ==
Helen Gilmer Bonfils was born in Peekskill, New York to American newspaper publisher Frederick Gilmer Bonfils and his wife Belle Barton Bonfils. She and her older sister, Mary Madeline ("May") Bonfils (1883–1962), had a strict Catholic upbringing. In 1894 the family moved to Kansas where Frederick ran legal lotteries, and in 1895 to Denver, where Frederick and his partner Harry Heye Tammen bought a newspaper that they renamed The Denver Post.

In Denver, the Bonfils girls attended an elite private girls' school. Helen attended finishing school at the National Park Seminary in Forest Glen Park, Maryland. Frederick kept a tight rein on his daughters, forbidding them to date and warning them that "the boys were only out for their money". Helen became the "favored daughter" after May eloped at age 21 with a non-Catholic salesman, a move that estranged May from her family for decades.

Upon their father's death in 1933, Helen, who still lived at home, received $14 million from his estate. She received another $10 million bequest in 1935 upon the death of her mother, plus newspaper stock and possession of the family's Humboldt Street mansion. May received only a $25,000 annual allowance from a trust, and sued her sister over her mother's estate. After a pitched, three-year legal battle, May was awarded $5 million cash from her mother's estate, some cash from her father's estate, 15% of the Denver Post stock, and additional real estate. The court case divided the sisters even further and they cut off all communication with each other.

== The Denver Post ==
In 1933, Bonfils assumed the management of The Denver Post and served as secretary-treasurer of the corporation. Her flair for the theatrical extended to her ordering two dozen yellow roses to be placed in the lobby of The Denver Post to welcome her arrival; she drove to the building in a Pierce-Arrow touring car bearing the Colorado license plate "#1". In 1934, she introduced a free summer series of Broadway plays and light opera staged outdoors at the Cheesman Park Pavilion under the auspices of The Denver Post. Starring Broadway performers in the lead roles and local players in lesser parts, these performances attracted up to 20,000 people per performance, and were staged every year until Bonfils' death in 1972.

In 1946, she hired a new editor, Palmer Hoyt, to give the paper more journalistic integrity. In 1966, she became president of the paper and asked Donald Seawell, a theatrical producer whom she had met on Broadway, to move to Denver and become chairman and publisher.

== Theatrical career ==
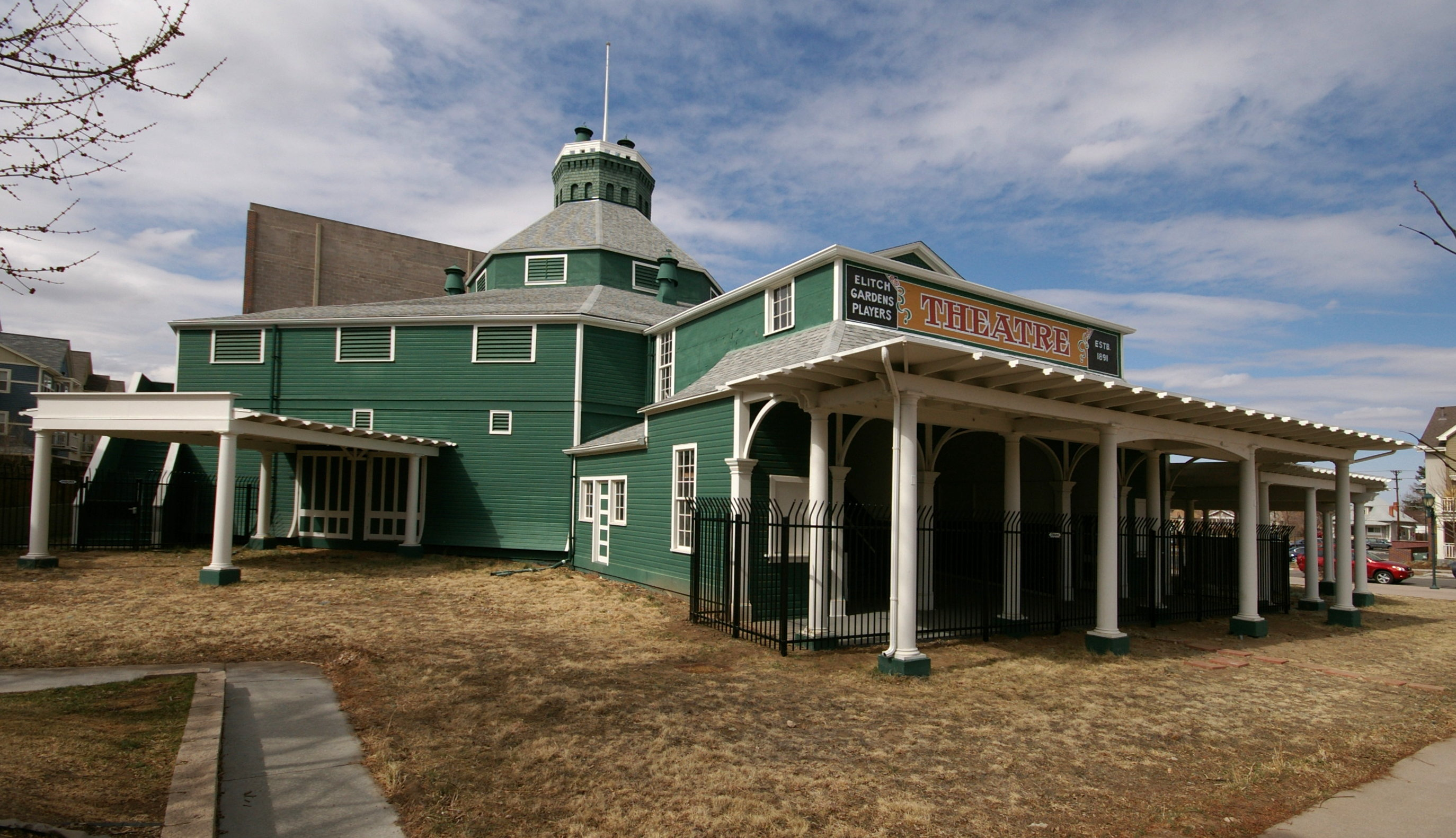
Elitch Theatre

Bonfils' first love was the theatre. She acted with the Elitch Stock Theatre, helped organize and performed in the Civic Theatre at the University of Denver, performed at the Bonfils Memorial Theatre, and also acted on Broadway under the stage name Gertrude Barton (her mother's maiden name).

With her first husband, George Somnes, she co-produced plays in Denver and in New York City through the Bonfils & Somnes Producing Co. Among their hit productions were The Greatest Show on Earth (1938), in which Helen also performed. After Somnes' death in 1956, Helen co-produced plays on Broadway and in London with actress Haila Stoddard and Donald Seawell under Bonard Productions, and co-produced Broadway plays with Seawell under Bonfils-Seawell Enterprises. The latter partnership produced the successful Broadway musical Sail Away (1962), The Hollow Crown (1963), The Last Analysis (1964), and Sleuth, which won the 1971 Tony Award.

== Marriages ==
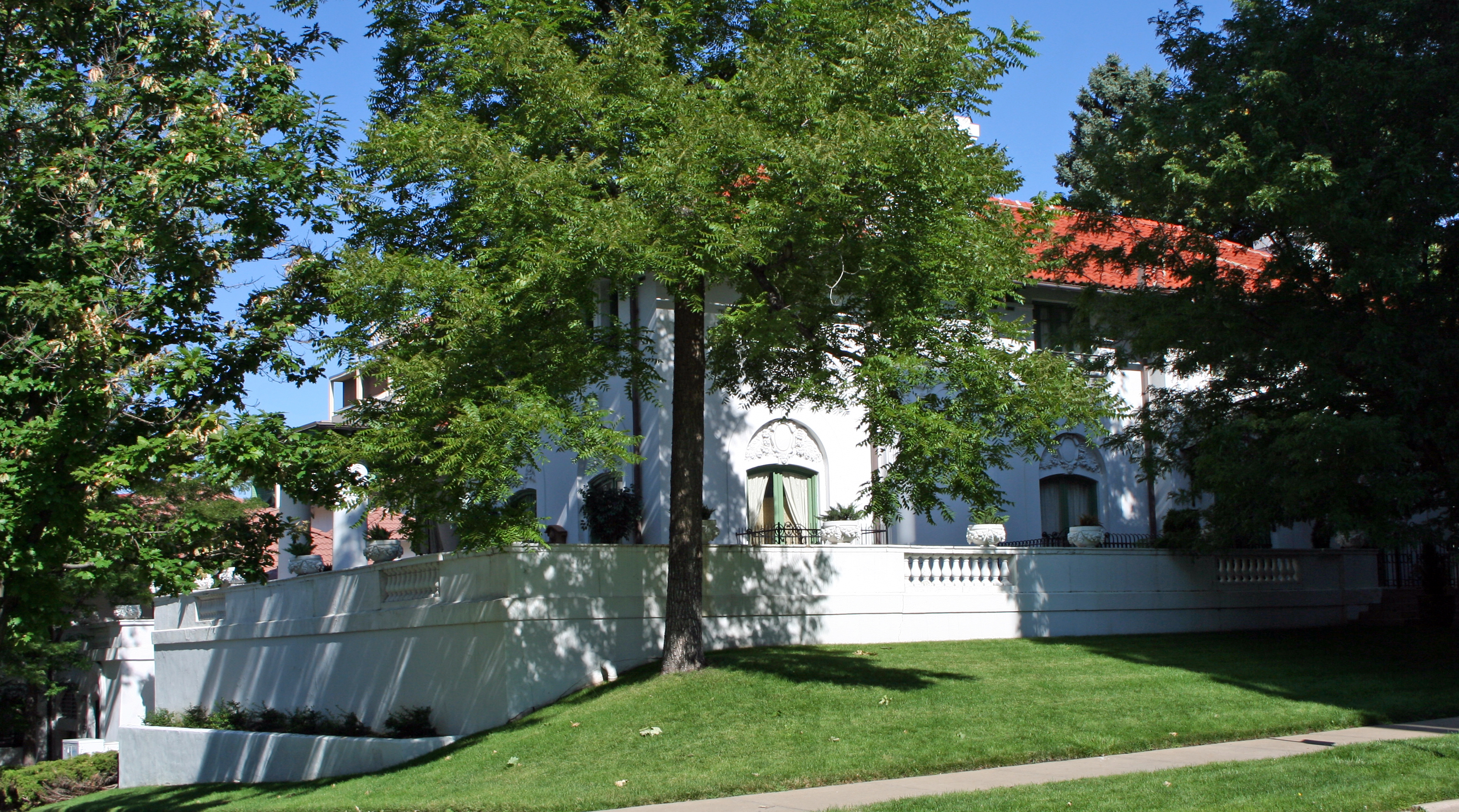
Wood–Morris–Bonfils House in 2009

Bonfils met English actor and theatrical producer George Somnes when he was hired by the Elitch Theatre in 1936. They married that year, when Bonfils was 47. The couple – always referred to as "Helen Bonfils and George Somnes" – bought a condominium at River House in New York City and resided in Denver at the Humboldt Street mansion. In 1948 Helen sold the mansion to the Conservative Baptist Theological Seminary and purchased the Wood–Morris–Bonfils House, a French Mediterranean Revival mansion at 707 Washington Street in the Capitol Hill neighborhood of Denver. The couple's amicable personal and professional partnership ended with Somnes' death in February 1956 due to liver failure.

Craving companionship, Helen turned to her chauffeur, Edward Michael "Tiger Mike" Davis. She married him in April 1959 at the age of 69; he was 28. Bonfils sued for divorce in December 1971 after 12 years of marriage, possibly to preempt any claim Davis might have to her estate. The divorce was granted on the grounds of cruelty. Bonfils retained the rights to her name, and Davis received the Wood–Morris–Bonfils House, $1.6 million in promissory notes, and $50,000 cash.

== Philanthropy ==
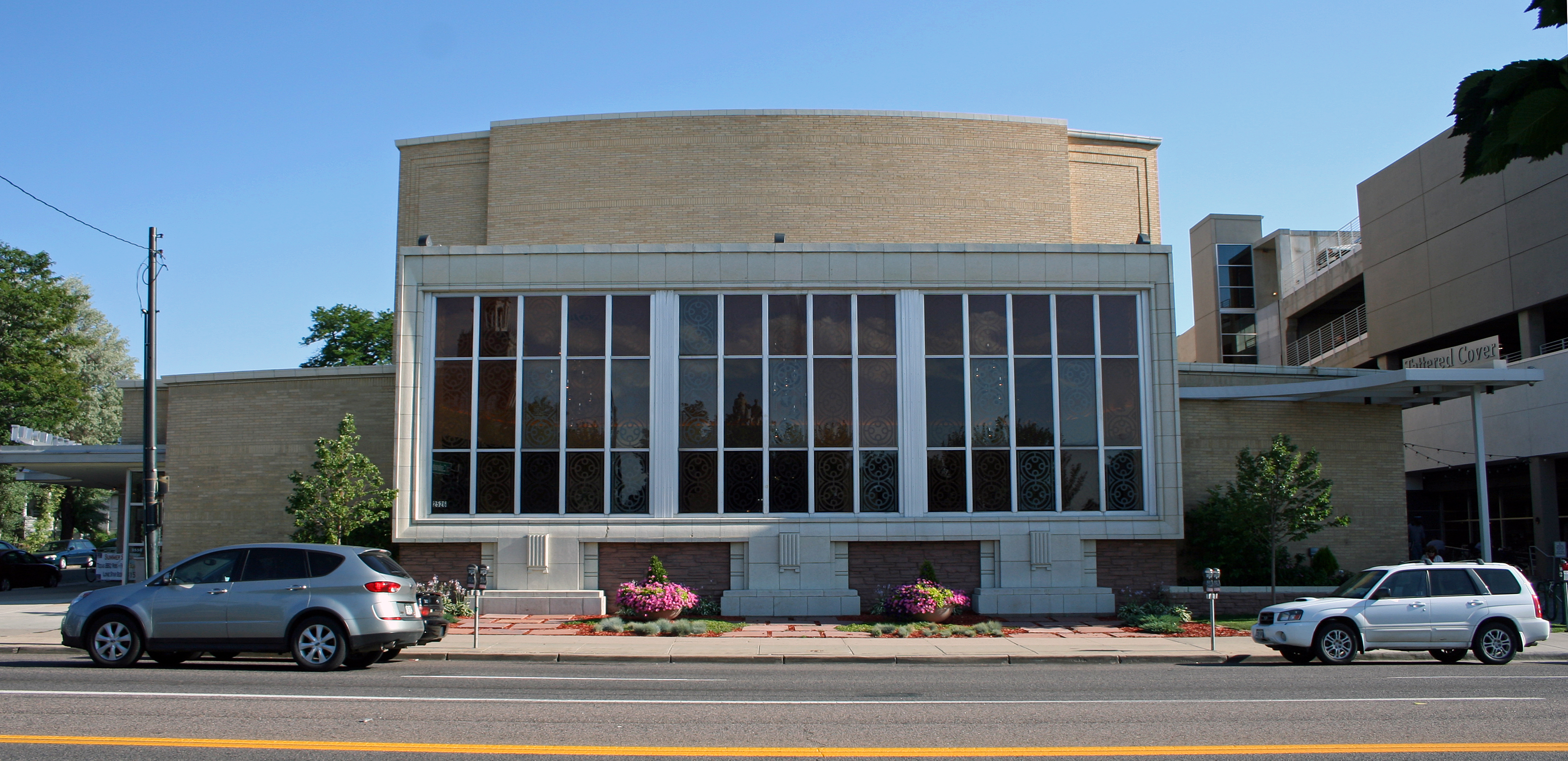
Bonfils Memorial Theatre

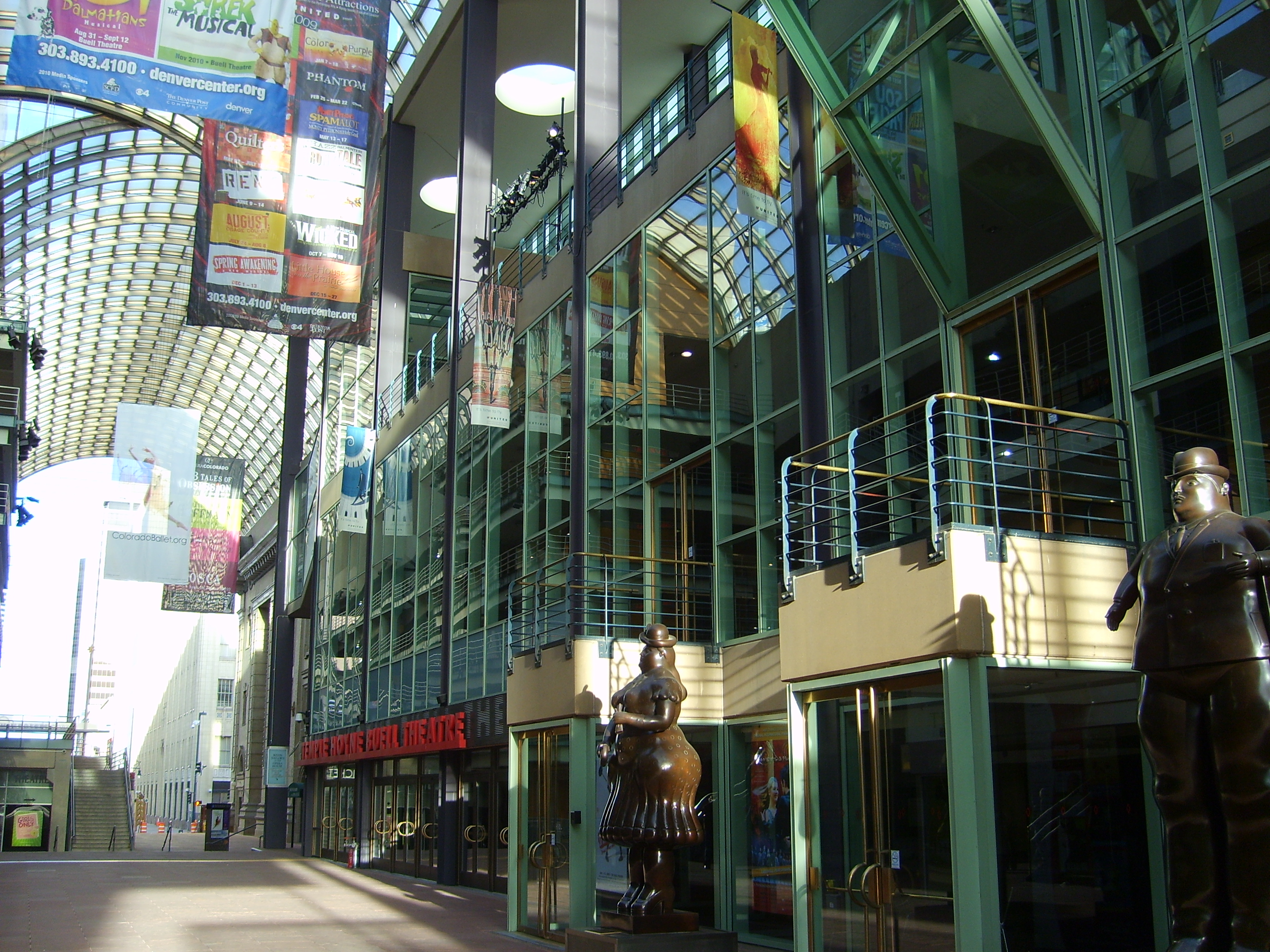
Denver Center for the Performing Arts

Lacking heirs, Bonfils invested her fortune into supporting culture, arts, healthcare, education, and humanitarian causes in Denver and the state of Colorado. She inherited the presidency of the philanthropic Frederick G. Bonfils Foundation after her father's death and between 1936 and 1973 distributed nearly $11 million.

This included the Belle Bonfils Blood Bank, established in 1943 in memory of her mother. The blood bank eventually became self-supporting and was eventually renamed the Belle Bonfils Blood Center. As of 2004, the Bonfils Blood Center served 115 Colorado hospitals and healthcare centers and had an operating budget of $57.8 million. In 2018, Bonfils Blood Center was incorporated into Vitalant.

Helen Bonfils further established the Bonfils Tumor Clinic in her father's memory, finished and furnished the Holy Ghost Catholic Church at a cost of $1.2 million, and helped construct the Nurses' Home at the University of Colorado School of Medicine.

In 1953, Bonfils dedicated the 550-seat Bonfils Memorial Theatre at 1475 Elizabeth Street, corner East Colfax Avenue, in memory of both her parents. As the headquarters for the Denver Civic Theatre, the $1.25 million theatre hosted plays, operas, concerts, lectures, films, and television shows. Helen acted there on numerous occasions. Considered "one of the country's most successful community theaters", it closed in 1986 and was converted into a Tattered Cover bookstore in 2006. The building was listed on the National Register of Historic Places in 2006.

Bonfils also supported the University of Denver, the Central City Opera, the Denver Symphony Orchestra, the Denver Zoo, the Dumb Friends League animal shelter, the Denver Community Chest/United Way, and many churches and synagogues. In 1948 alone, the Frederick G. Bonfils Foundation distributed more than $1.4 million to churches of different denominations. Helen also underwrote college scholarships for men and women totalling hundreds of thousands of dollars.

Upon her death in 1972, both the Frederick G. Bonfils Foundation and the Helen G. Bonfils Foundation ceased acting as private charities and diverted all funds to a permanent endowment for the Denver Center for the Performing Arts. Donald Seawell became chairman of the board of the new foundation and guided the expansion of the Denver Performing Arts Complex. By the 1990s, the downtown complex had grown to four square blocks and encompassed eight theatres with capacity seating for 9,000.

== Later years ==
Bonfils became embroiled in a drawn-out legal battle in her later years. In 1960 her sister May sold her Denver Post stock to newspaper baron Samuel Irving Newhouse Jr. on the condition that the stock could never be resold to Helen. With this stake in the company, Newhouse attempted to take over the paper, and Helen sued him. The court case dragged on for 12 years and concluded six months after Helen's death, when an appeals court overruled the district court's ruling and prevented Newhouse from taking over the paper. However, the $5 million spent on attorney fees drained the newspaper's coffers and in 1980 The Denver Post was sold to the Los Angeles-based Times Mirror Company.

Bonfils was hospitalized for the last six years of her life at Saint Joseph Hospital, where she and her entourage occupied the entire top floor. She died on June 6, 1972, at the age of 82. She was buried in the Bonfils family vault at the Fairmount Mausoleum alongside her parents and first husband Somnes. Her sister May, who had predeceased her in 1962, was entombed in her own mausoleum a short distance away from the rest of the family.

== Posthumous ==
Bonfils was posthumously inducted into the Colorado Women's Hall of Fame in 1985. She was named to the inaugural class of the Colorado Performing Arts Hall of Fame in 1999.

Bonfils' life and work were recounted in two biographies published after her death. They were: High Altitude Attitudes: Six Savvy Colorado Women by Marilyn Griggs Riley (Big Earth Publishing, 2006) and Papa's Girl: The Fascinating World of Helen Bonfils by Eva Hodges Watt (Western Reflections Publishing Co., 2007). A stage play, The Bonfils Girl by Mike Broemmel, premiered in Denver, Colorado, in 2016. It starred Cathy Washburn in the title role. Beginning in 2024, Karilyn Starks took over the role of Helen Bonfils and Selena A. Naumoff directs the revival production. The Bonfils Girl was selected as the stage play to relaunch theatrical productions at the historic Elitch Theatre in 2024. Elitch Theatre was the first summer stock playhouse in the United States and shuttered over 30 years before the play chronicling the life of Helen Bonfils headlined the reopening of the venue.

== Sources ==
- Bretz, James (2005). The Mansions of Denver: The Vintage Years. Pruett Publishing. p. 114. ISBN 0871089378.
- Riley, Marilyn Griggs (2006). High Altitude Attitudes: Six Savvy Colorado Women. Big Earth Publishing. ISBN 1555663753.
- Varnell, Jeanne (1999). Women of Consequence: The Colorado Women's Hall of Fame. Big Earth Publishing. ISBN 1555662145.
- Wood, Richard E. (2005). Here Lies Colorado: Fascinating Figures in Colorado History. Farcounty Press. ISBN 1560373342.
