= River House (New York City) =

Apartment building in Manhattan, New York

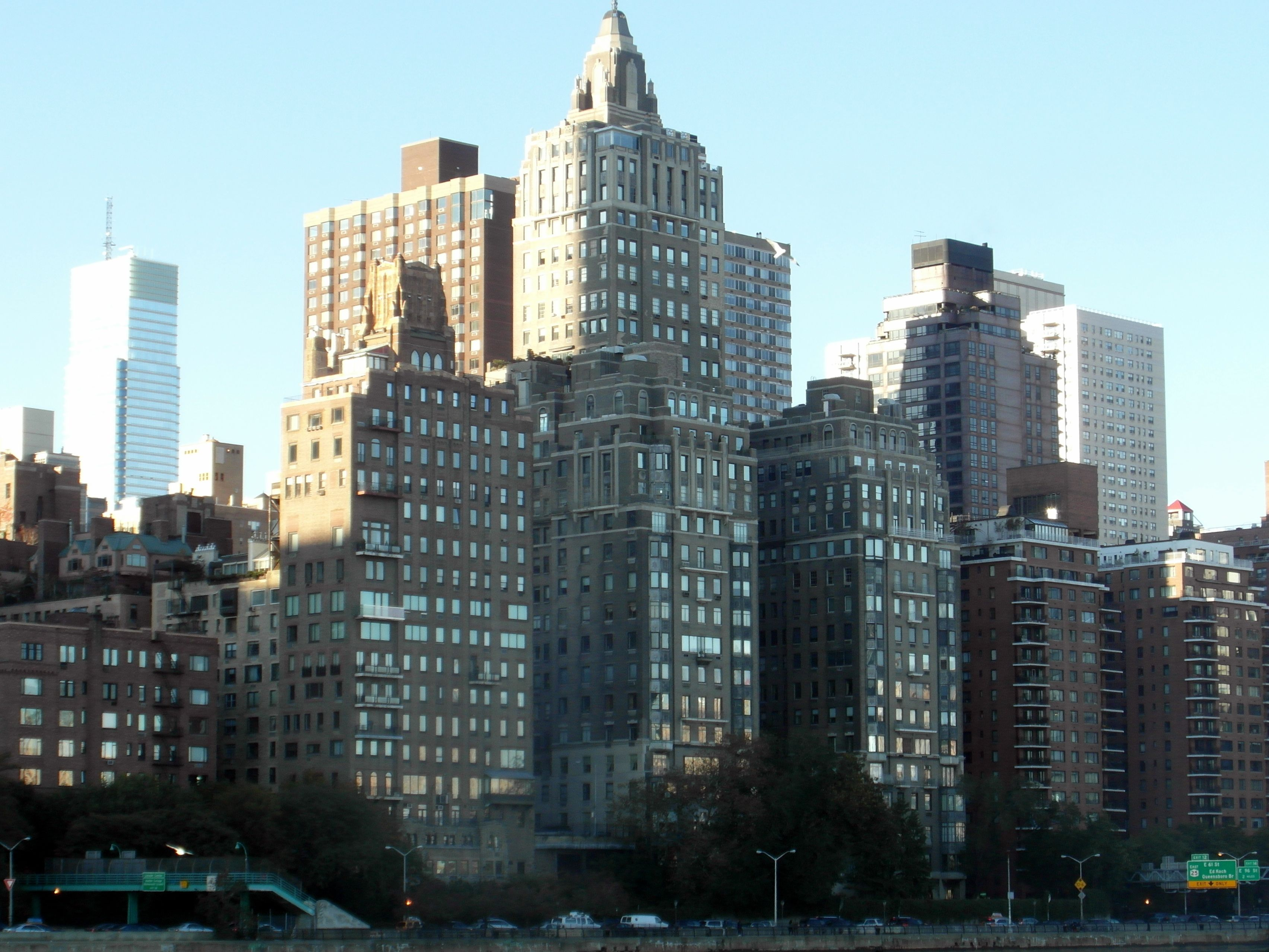
- Interactive map of the River House area

General information
- Type: Housing cooperative
- Architectural style: Art Deco
- Location: 435 East 52nd Street, New York, NY, US
- Coordinates: 40.754613°N 73.963000°W
- Construction started: 1930
- Completed: 1931

Technical details
- Floor count: 26

Design and construction
- Architecture firm: Bottomley, Wagner & White

River House is a co-op apartment building located at 435 East 52nd Street in Manhattan, New York City. Its rear entrance is on East 53rd Street, within the Sutton Place neighborhood.

== History ==
The 26-story River House was constructed in 1931 on the site of a former cigar factory and designed by William Lawrence Bottomley in the Art Deco style. Designed for cooperative ownership, the building featured 78 apartments with 12 rooms, 6 baths, and two fireplaces. Originally, the building featured a pier where residents could dock their yachts, but that amenity was lost with the construction of the FDR Drive. The building has a gated cobblestone courtyard featuring a fountain.

During the Great Depression, residents defaulted on mortgage interest payments and the court ruled the property could be sold as a foreclosure in 1941. In 1948, the building was bought by Tishman Realty & Construction who wanted to split the suites into 170 smaller apartments. Tenants opposed the renovations and sought legal counsel to retain their apartments intact.

Historically, the co-op board was notorious for turning away applicants who failed to meet strict liquidity requirements or those whose "comings and goings would attract unwelcome publicity to the River House". Famously, Gloria Vanderbilt was rejected by the board in 1980. She accused the board of racism (she was in a relationship with African-American singer Bobby Short), while the board claimed she had been rejected on her merits. Other celebrities alleged to have been rejected by the board include Richard Nixon, Joan Crawford, Diane Keaton, and in 2014, the French Ambassador to the United Nations, François Delattre.

== The River Club ==
Parts of the lower levels of the building are leased to the River Club, a private club that counts slightly more than half of the building's shareholders among its 900 or so members. It was the first social club with well-known members to accept both men and women. It featured a swimming pool, a terrace overlooking the East River, tennis courts, and a ballroom.

As of 2013 the members, who include David H. Koch and Aerin Lauder, pay approximately $10,000 in annual membership fees. The club includes a restaurant, an indoor pool and tennis courts.

After several years of negotiations where the club attempted to negotiate the purchase of its space, in 2021 the co-op board and the River Club concluded a new long-term lease for the Club's space which will ensure the continuity of the River Club for generations to come.

== Notable residents ==
- Cornelius Vanderbilt Whitney, businessman, film producer, philanthropist, polo player, government official, and owner of thoroughbred racehorses.
- Edwin Howard Armstrong, inventor of FM radio
- Helen Bonfils and George Somnes, Broadway producers
- Catherine "Deeda" (Gerlach) Blair, wife of ambassador William McCormick Blair, Jr.
- Donald M. Blinken, ambassador
- Sir Philip Bobbitt, author, academic
- Barbara Taylor Bradford, author
- Ferdinand Eberstadt, investment banker
- Walter Hoving, businessman and former chairman of Tiffany & Co.
- Henry Kissinger, United States Secretary of State
- Isabel Leighton, actress and writer
- Joshua Logan, writer and director
- Malcolm Muir, magazine industrialist
- Alexandra Penney, author and magazine editor
- Holly Peterson, author
- Peter George Peterson, businessman and United States Secretary of Commerce
- Kermit Roosevelt, explorer and son of Theodore Roosevelt
- Quentin Reynolds, journalist
- Uma Thurman, actress
- Kiliaen Van Rensselaer, businessman
- William Roberston Coe, businessman
