= Midnight Club (disambiguation) =

Midnight Club is a racing video game series.

Midnight Club may also refer to:

- Midnight Club (film), a 1933 crime film
- The Midnight Club, a 1994 novel by Christopher Pike
  - The Midnight Club, a television series based on the novel
