= Bonfils Memorial Theatre =

United States historic place, in Denver, Colorado

- U.S. National Register of Historic Places
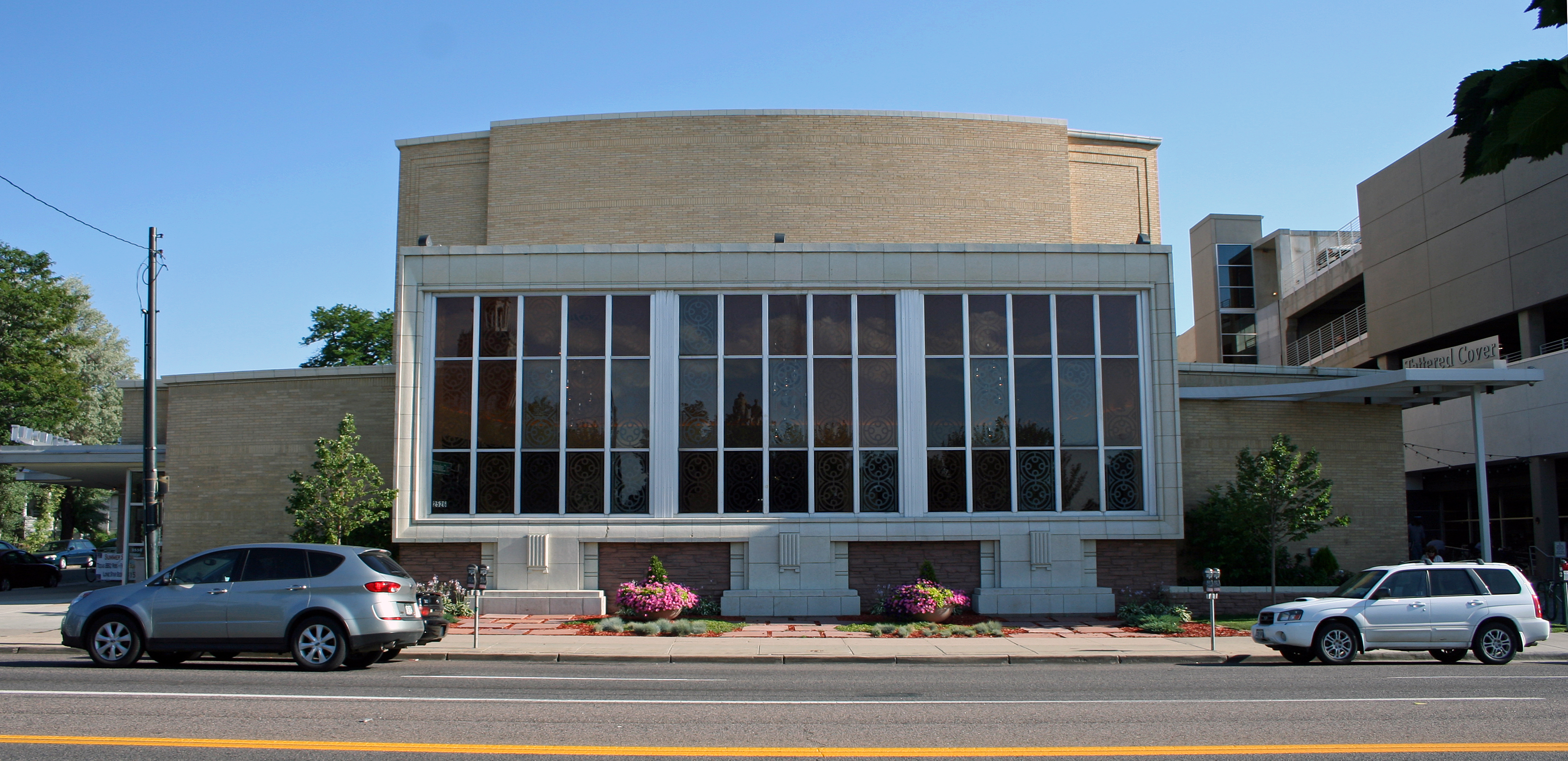
- Theatre building in 2009

- Location within Colorado Location within the United States
- Location: 1475 Elizabeth Street, Denver, Colorado
- Coordinates: 39°44′24″N 104°57′24″W
- Area: Northeast Denver, Colorado
- Built: 1953
- Architect: John K. Monroe
- Architectural style: Art Moderne
- NRHP reference No.: 91001417
- Added to NRHP: December 27, 2006

Bonfils Memorial Theatre, also known as Lowenstein Theatre, was a community theatre in the Capitol Hill neighborhood of Denver, Colorado, which operated from 1953 to 1986. Built by Denver philanthropist Helen Bonfils in memory of her parents, Frederick Gilmer Bonfils and Belle Barton Bonfils, it staged plays, operas, concerts, films, lectures, and television shows, presenting more than 400 productions. In 1985 it was renamed the Lowenstein Theatre in honor of its longtime producer, Henry Lowenstein. The theatre closed in 1986 and sat vacant for two decades. It was purchased in 2005 by Charles Woolley of the St. Charles Town Company, which renovated and reopened the building in 2006 as a Tattered Cover bookstore. The theatre building is listed on the National Register of Historic Places.

== History ==
Theatre entrance

The theatre was designed in Art Moderne style by Denver architect John K. Monroe. The one-story structure, covering 66,000 square feet (6,100 m^{2}), was faced in cream-colored brick and trimmed in buff-colored terra cotta and red sandstone. Below the "wing-swept" marquee, a contoured aluminum canopy overhung the entrance.

Inside, the travertine lobby sported a "Prussian blue rug, wood-paneled walls, pumpkin-colored plaster, and tall windows". On one side of the lobby stood a shrine to the Abbey Theatre in England. The lower lobby and bar was accessed via a grand staircase.

The theatre had seating for 550. Its Prussian-blue stage curtain was complemented by gray side walls and red carpeting. Backstage were nine dressing rooms. Monroe designed an electronic lighting switchboard – a "smaller version of the system used in New York City's Metropolitan Opera House" – to accommodate a variety of productions, including plays, operas, concerts, films, and lectures. The venue was also appropriate for use as a television studio.

Helen Bonfils consulted with actor Raymond Burr on the theatre layout. Decades later, the Perry Mason TV movies starring Burr used the premises as a filming location between 1987 and 1989.

The Bonfils Memorial Theatre was built at a cost of $1.25 million by Helen Bonfils, a Denver philanthropist and owner of The Denver Post, in memory of her parents, Frederick Gilmer Bonfils and Belle Barton Bonfils. Bonfils designated the theatre as the new home for the University Civic Theatre, an amateur theatre which since 1929 had operated on the campus of the University of Denver. In 1942 Bonfils gifted a different site, at 1425 Cleveland Place, to the University Civic Theatre, but due to World War II the building could not be remodeled. In 1948 Bonfils acquired the property at 1425 Elizabeth Street and arranged for the removal of a ten-room house to make room for construction of a theatre, which she rented to the newly renamed Denver Civic Theatre for one dollar a year.

With its opening on October 14, 1953, the Bonfils Memorial Theatre was the first live-performance theatre to open in Denver in four decades. It quickly became the "social center of the city", with opening nights presided over by Bonfils and attended by society figures. President Dwight D. Eisenhower dispatched a congratulatory telegram to Helen Bonfils upon the theatre's opening. The first production, Green Grow the Lilacs, was seen by an audience of 500.

=== Productions and performers ===
The theatre presented main stage, cabaret, and children's theatre. It staged more than 400 productions from 1953 to 1986. Performers at the Bonfils Memorial Theatre included John Ashton, Tony Church, and Cleo Parker Robinson. Celebrities who appeared in theatrical productions included Helen Bonfils (herself an actress and theatrical producer), Mary Jo Catlett, Julia Child (she gave a cooking demonstration), Kevin Kline, Patti LuPone, Ted Shackelford, David Ogden Stiers, Marilyn Van Derbur (Miss Colorado 1957 and Miss America 1958), Joan Van Ark, Emlyn Williams, and Paul Winfield. Bonfils lent her extensive collection of "fur coats, jewels, silver, furniture, and rugs" as props for many productions.

During the summers, the theatre sent a "summer festival caravan" around to city parks to entertain audiences, and presented a free outdoor musical in Cheesman Park.

Henry Lowenstein, hired as a set designer in 1956, became the theatrical producer in 1967. In 1985 the theatre was renamed the Lowenstein Theatre in his honor.

=== Closure ===
The theatre remained open for more than a decade after Helen Bonfils' death in 1972. In 1973 the Denver Civic Theatre moved to the Denver Center for the Performing Arts (DCPA), and in 1974 the Bonfils Memorial Theatre came under the jurisdiction of the governing board of the DCPA, which had been formed from Bonfils' estate. The board continued to operate the Bonfils Memorial Theatre as a community theatre, but in 1984, as professional theatre gained popularity at the DCPA, the board closed the main stage. The cabaret and children's shows continued to be staged until 1986, when the board closed the theatre permanently. After the DCPA opened, the productions at Bonfils continued to attract a large audience. The story goes, Don Seawell, Chairman of the DCPA, attended a production of Sweeney Todd, did not like the competition, and decided to close the Bonfils. Many in the local theater community considered the renaming of the Bonfils to the Lowenstein to be an honor but also a slap in the face to Henry.

=== Renovation ===
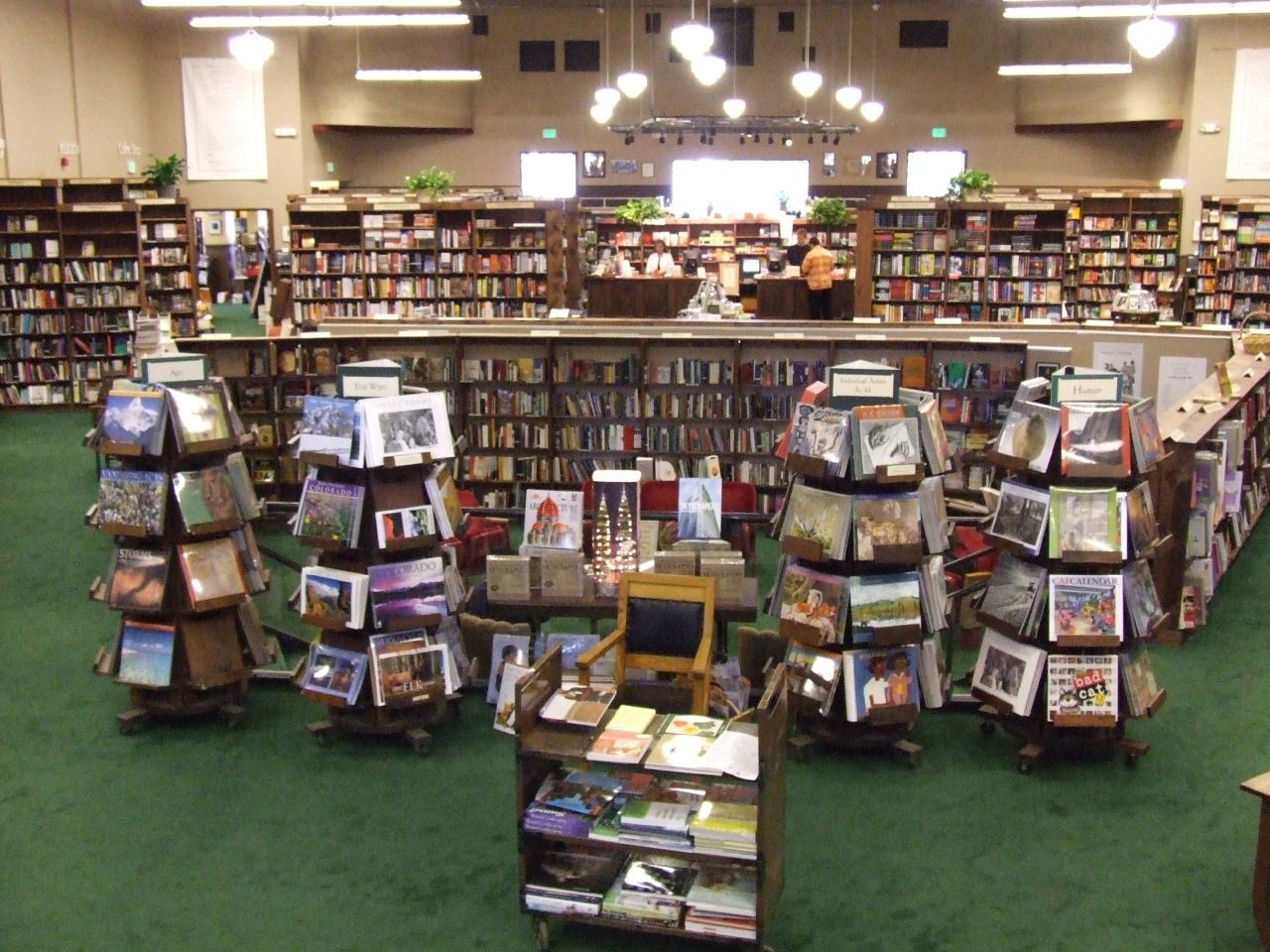
Tattered Cover bookstore in the former theatre; the orchestra pit is in the foreground

The theatre sat vacant for two decades. In May 2005 Charles Woolley of the St. Charles Town Company purchased the property from the Bonfils Foundation for $1.9 million. The development company undertook a $16 million preservation and renovation project to convert the theatre into a bookstore and add a record shop, art cinema, and 230-space parking garage to the adjoining lot.

In June 2006 the theatre building reopened as a Tattered Cover bookstore. While few changes were made to the exterior, the sloped flooring of the theatre had to be leveled and the interior redesigned for retail trade. The redesign, executed by architect Josh Comfort, retained many "historical details and finishes"; for example, some original red mohair-covered seats were retained in two rear balcony areas, and the original orchestra pit, accessed via a ramp, was filled with a display of "books on the performing arts". The backstage dressing rooms, rehearsal area, and offices made way for a restaurant and coffee shop. The development company received the 2006 Community Preservation Award from Historic Denver for the project.

The theatre building was listed on the National Register of Historic Places in 2006.

== Sources ==
- Noel, Thomas J. (2016). Denver Landmarks and Historic Districts. University Press of Colorado. ISBN 978-1607324225.
- Riley, Marilyn Griggs (2006). High Altitude Attitudes: Six Savvy Colorado Women. Big Earth Publishing. ISBN 1555663753.
- Varnell, Jeanne (1999). Women of Consequence: The Colorado Women's Hall of Fame. Big Earth Publishing. ISBN 1555662145.
