= George Somnes =

American director (1887–1956)

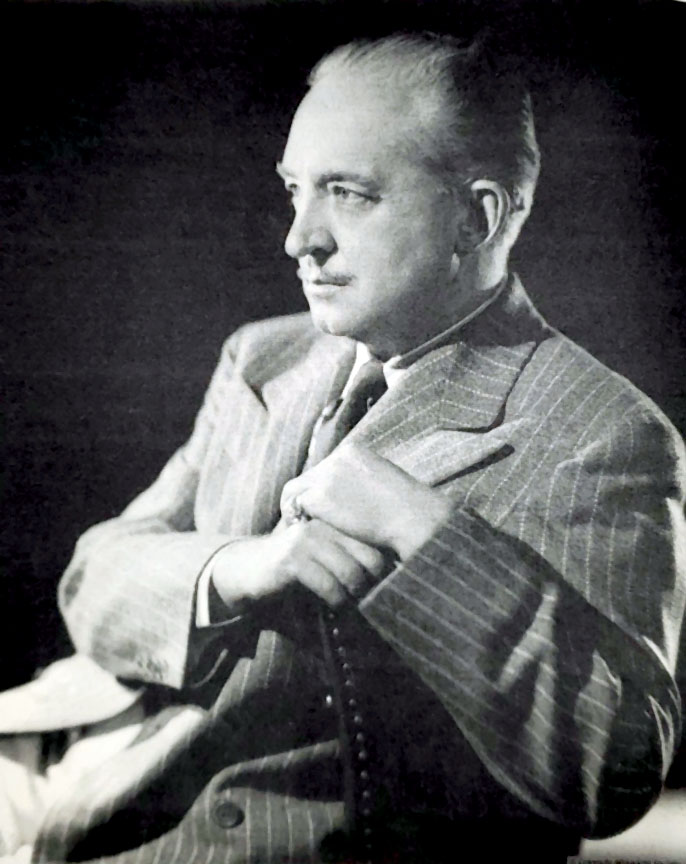
- Somnes in 1934
- Born: July 7, 1887
- Died: February 8, 1956 (aged 68); Denver, Colorado
- Occupations: Director, actor
- Spouse: Helen Bonfils (m. 1936)
- Family: Frederick Gilmer Bonfils (father-in-law); May Bonfils Stanton (sister-in-law)

George Somnes, born George Carleton Flye (July 7, 1887 – February 8, 1956) was an American theatre director and producer and film director.

== Career ==
In 1911, Somnes' first Broadway appearance was in An Old New Yorker by Harrison Rhodes and Thomas A. Wise and produced by William A. Brady. He then went to London and was the first American to gain prominence in the Old Vic Theater, with his interpretation of King Claudius in Hamlet.

When the United States entered World War I, Somnes left England and went into the Army, where he became a top sergent in the field artillery.

In the 1920s Somnes was a member of the old Stuart Walker Stock Company in Indianapolis and later involved with the Civic Theater there.

From 1929 to 1934, Somnes was in Hollywood and directed stars including Sylvia Sidney, Claudette Colbert, Gary Cooper and George Raft. His film directing career included: The Girl in 419, Midnight Club and Torch Singer in 1933 and Wharf Angel in 1934, co-directing with William Cameron Menzies.

On stage he directed productions such as the drama Reprise (1935), the comedies Sun Kissed (1937) and The Greatest Show on Earth (1938), the melodrama Brown Danube (1939), and the drama Land's End (1946).

== Elitch Theatre ==
In 1934, Somnes first appeared at the Elitch Theatre and his he and his future wife, Helen Bonfils, would be making their first of many appearances together at the theatre. He married Bonfils in 1936.

Somnes opened the 1946 season at the Elitch Theatre with The Mermaid Sings, which was his 101st play as director. On this occasion, Somnes stated: "The first hundred plays are the hardest."

His dates acting and directing for the Historic Elitch Theatre include: 1936 to 1943, 1947, and 1951 to 1954.

== Personal life ==
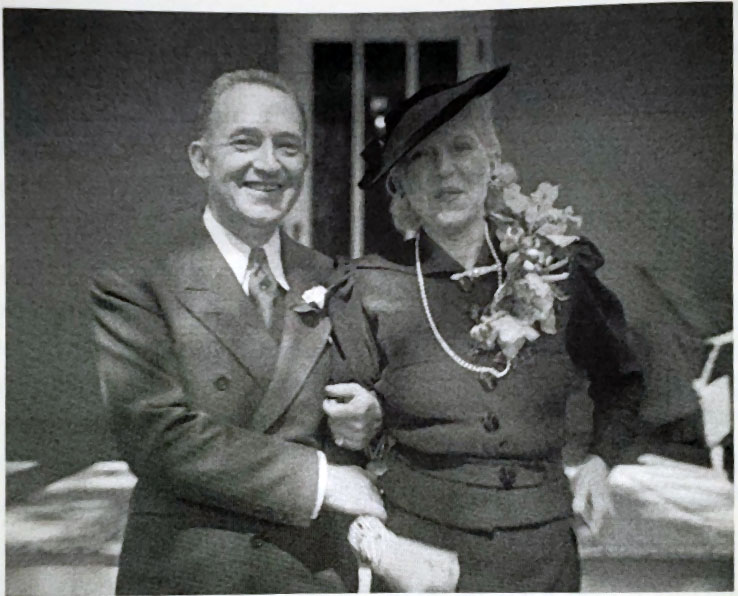
Helen Bonfils and George Somnes Wedding Day (1936)

In the fall of 1936, Somnes and Helen Bonfils were married in the rose garden of the Gurtler home at 4209 W. 38th Avenue in Denver. (The Gurtler family owned Elitch Gardens.)

The couple lived in the Wood-Morris-Bonfils House in Denver. Somnes died in Denver in 1956 and was buried in the Bonfils family vault at the Fairmount Mausoleum in Denver, and was joined by Bonfils in 1972.
