= May Bonfils Stanton =

American heiress and philanthropist (1883–1962)

- Born: Mary Madeline Bonfils; April 30, 1883; Troy, Missouri, US
- Died: March 11, 1962 (aged 78); Lakewood, Colorado, US
- Resting place: Fairmount Cemetery, Denver, Colorado
- Known for: Philanthropy
- Spouses: Clyde V. Berryman; Charles Edwin Stanton
- Father: Frederick Gilmer Bonfils
- Relatives: Helen Bonfils (sister)
- Awards: Colorado Women's Hall of Fame (1985)

Mary Madeline "May" Bonfils Stanton (April 30, 1883 – March 11, 1962) was an American heiress and philanthropist. She and her younger sister, Helen Bonfils, succeeded their father, Frederick Gilmer Bonfils, as principal owners of The Denver Post. However, May's elopement at age 21 with a non-Catholic salesman had forged a rift in her relationship with her parents and sister that worsened when Helen inherited the majority of their parents' estates. Following a three-year legal battle over the inheritance, the sisters cut off all communication with each other. May married twice but did not have children. Living a reclusive life, she invested her fortune into building and furnishing her 750-acre (300 ha) estate in Lakewood, Colorado – which included a mansion that was an exact replica of Marie Antoinette's Petit Trianon château in Versailles – and into many philanthropic endeavors in the state of Colorado. The Bonfils–Stanton Foundation, established by her second husband after her death in 1962, continues to support the arts in Colorado. She was posthumously inducted into the Colorado Women's Hall of Fame in 1985.

== Early life and family ==
Mary Madeline "May" Bonfils was born in Troy, Missouri, to Frederick Gilmer Bonfils and his wife, Belle Barton Bonfils. She had one sister, Helen, six years her junior. In 1894 the family moved to Kansas where Frederick ran legal lotteries, and in 1895 to Denver, where Frederick and Harry Heye Tammen purchased a newspaper that they renamed The Denver Post. In Denver, Bonfils studied at St. Mary's Academy and the Wolcott School for Girls, an elite private girls' school. She went on to graduate from Brownell School for Girls in New York.

The Bonfils girls had a strict Catholic upbringing. Frederick was especially vigilant with his eldest daughter and warned both girls against dating younger men because they "were only out for their money". After Bonfils graduated from Brownell, Frederick escorted her to Europe, where she studied French, art, and music, and mastered both piano and music composition.

In 1904, at the age of 21, Bonfils eloped with Clyde V. Berryman, a non-Catholic sheet music salesman; they were married in a civil ceremony in Golden, Colorado. Frederick was outraged and threatened to halve her inheritance if she did not file for divorce. The elopement opened a rift between Bonfils and her parents and sister, which only worsened with time. Bonfils and Clyde lived in Omaha, Kansas City, Wichita, and California, returning to Denver in 1916, where they lived mostly separate lives. In 1934 Berryman left her for good, and in 1943 she obtained a "quickie divorce" in Reno, Nevada, on grounds of "cruelty, nonsupport, and desertion". In 1947 she filed for a second divorce in Colorado and had her maiden name restored, but her family never reconciled with her.

== Estate and mansion ==
Following the death of her father in 1933 and her mother in 1935, Bonfils was named the beneficiary of a trust that guaranteed her a $25,000 annual income. However, her sister Helen received the majority of the inheritance: $14 million from her father's estate, $10 million from her mother's estate, The Denver Post stock, and the family's Humboldt Street mansion. Bonfils sued her sister over the inheritance in a court trial that lasted three years. In the end, Bonfils was awarded $5 million cash from her mother's estate, some cash from her father's estate, 15% of The Denver Post stock, and 10 acres (4.0 ha) of real estate in nearby Lakewood, Colorado. The court case caused an irreparable breach between the sisters, who stopped speaking to each other altogether. Helen, who became manager of The Denver Post, went so far as to order that Bonfils' name not be mentioned in the newspaper, "except for uncomplimentary remarks".

Bonfils lived alone and was rarely seen in public. She was known to be "devoutly religious". With her income from her Denver Post stock, she invested in blue chip stock and grew her fortune. She purchased properties adjacent to the 10 acres (4.0 ha) of land she had inherited to create a 750-acre (300 ha) estate that she called Belmar, combining the name of her mother Belle with her own name, Mary. The estate grounds included a 50 acres (20 ha) manmade lake, formal gardens, and grazing areas for 50 fallow deer and herds of prize Suffolk and Hampshire sheep.

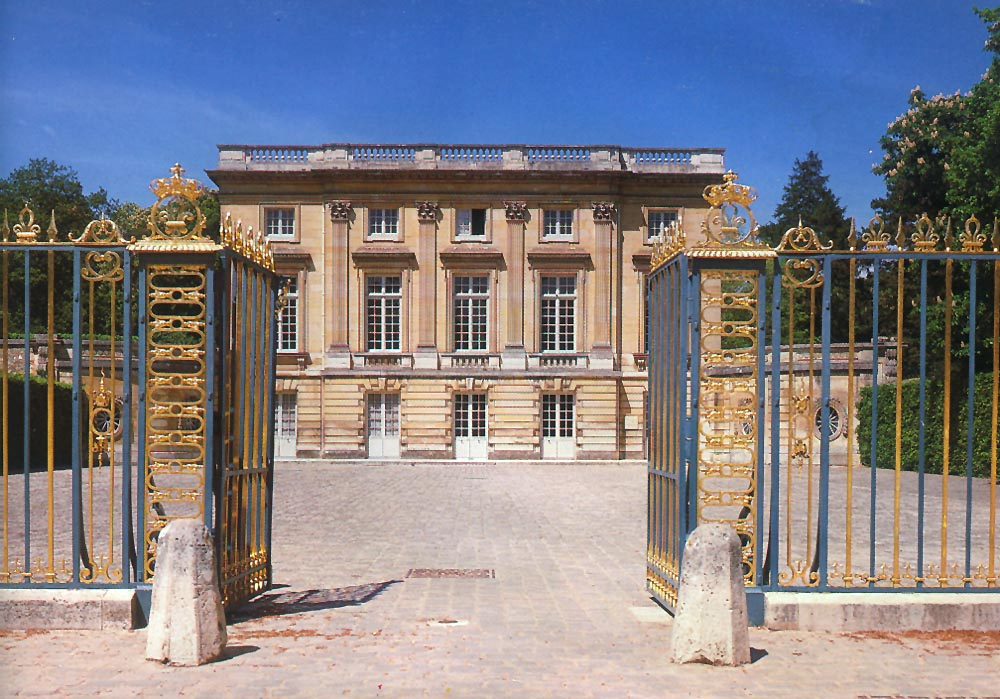
Petit Trianon château in Versailles, France

The centerpiece of the estate was a 20-room imitation of Marie Antoinette's Petit Trianon château in Versailles. Built in 1937 for more than $1 million, the white terra-cotta mansion was designed by noted Colorado architect Jacques Benedict. It contained a pink marble chapel where priests from the St. Elizabeth's Catholic Church of Denver held private masses for Bonfils, and a full-service dental clinic. Bonfils purchased paintings, sculptures, antique furnishings, and rare dolls to decorate the mansion and grounds on her annual trips to Europe. She also amassed a valuable jewelry collection, including the 70.21-carat Idol's Eye diamond and the 39.8-carat Liberator diamond, both purchased from Harry Winston; the 34.4-carat Stotesbury Emerald; a diamond and emerald necklace weighing 153 carats purchased from the Maharajah of Indore; and a diamond, Burmese ruby, and platinum necklace valued at $800,000 in 2003. All the stones were removed from their settings when her jewelry was sold at auction after her death.

Near the end of her life, Bonfils and her second husband, Charles Stanton, founded the Belmar Development Company and formulated plans to establish the Belmar residential neighborhood and the Lakewood downtown district, including the Villa Italia Shopping Center, on part of the property. After Bonfils' death, Stanton donated portions of the estate toward the establishment of the Bonfils–Stanton Library, the Belmar Museum (later expanded into the Historical Belmar Village museum complex), Belmar Park, and the Lakewood Civic Center.

== Second marriage ==
Bonfils met Charles Edwin Stanton (1909–1987), a noted interior designer, in the course of her charitable work for the Central City Opera, and asked him to oversee the installation of an elevator in her mansion. Eventually Bonfils asked Stanton to marry her, reportedly so he would help manage her estate and also insure that Helen would not inherit any of it. They married at Belmar on May 28, 1956, before a district judge; she was 73 and Stanton was 46. They renewed their marriage vows in Rome in 1961 and were blessed by Pope John XXIII. The couple lived lavishly, entertained friends at Belmar, and traveled often to Europe.

== Philanthropy ==
Lacking heirs, Bonfils invested her fortune into supporting culture, arts, healthcare, education, and humanitarian causes in Denver and the state of Colorado. She endowed the Clinic of Ophthalmology at the University of Colorado Medical Center, the library and auditorium at Loretto Heights College, the Bonfils Wing at the Denver Museum of Natural History, and the interior décor of the Catholic Chapel at the United States Air Force Academy in Colorado Springs. She rebuilt and funded the St. Elizabeth's Church and monastery on the Auraria Campus in Denver, and endowed the Villa Nazareth Orphanage in Rome.

== Final years ==
In June 1960 she sold most of her Denver Post stock to newspaper baron Samuel Irving Newhouse Jr. for a price reportedly in excess of $3.5 million, on the condition that the stock would never be resold to her sister Helen. This acquisition led Newhouse to try to take over the paper, resulting in a 12-year court battle with Helen.

Bonfils Stanton died on March 11, 1962, at the age of 78. She was initially buried in a private mausoleum on the grounds of the Fairmount Mausoleum where her parents were buried, but her remains were later moved to Mount Olivet Cemetery per her will.

== Legacy ==
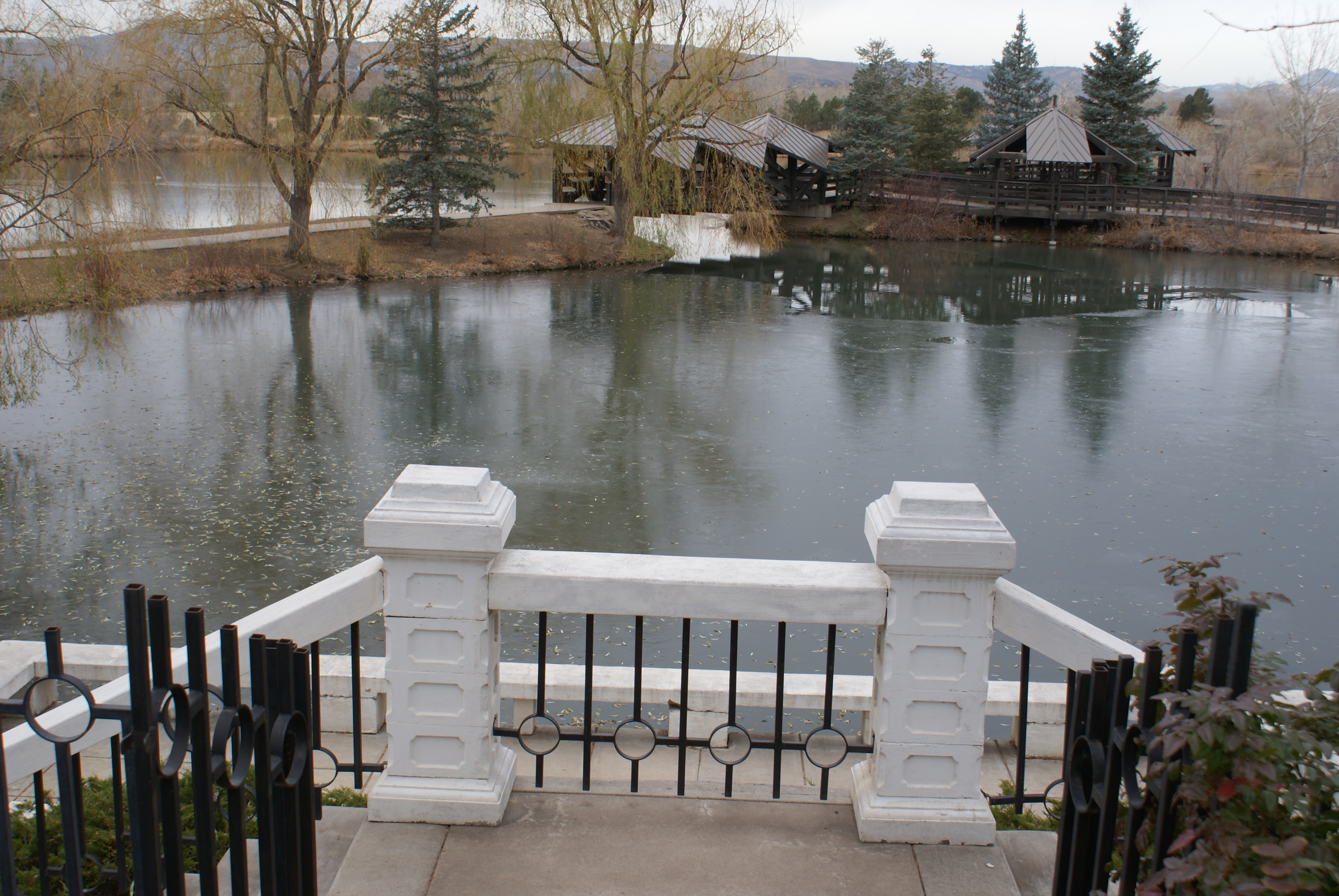
View of the lake and boating dock at Belmar Park in 2010

Bonfils Stanton willed approximately half of her $13 million estate – including the mansion and the surrounding 10 acres (4.0 ha) – to Stanton, with the provision that it be transferred to the Roman Catholic Archdiocese of Denver if he remarried. Stanton eventually donated the mansion to the Church, but when the Church could not find a use for it in keeping with the terms of Bonfils Stanton's will, it had the mansion demolished in 1970. The marble entry gate and marble boat dock are still extant. Bonfils Stanton put the other half of her estate in trust for the Franciscan Religious Order of St. Elizabeth's Catholic Church of Denver.

After Bonfils' death, Stanton, together with his brother Robert Stanton and Albert Zarlengo, incorporated the Bonfils–Stanton Foundation. Stanton's own estate was added to the foundation upon his death in 1987. By 1997 the foundation had assets of $44 million, and by 2003, $71.2 million. The foundation has endowed the Denver Art Museum, Central City Opera, Colorado Symphony, Lakewood Arts Council, Red Rocks Community College, Hospice of St. John, Cenikor, the Boy Scouts, the Girl Scouts, the Eleanor Roosevelt Institute for Cancer Research, the Bonfils–Stanton Foundation Music Library at the University of Denver, the May Bonfils–Stanton Rose Garden at the Denver Botanic Gardens, and numerous charities. In 2015 the Bonfils–Stanton Foundation redirected its focus to the arts, granting $3 million a year to orchestras, dance companies, art galleries, and startup arts organizations.

Bonfils Stanton was posthumously inducted into the Colorado Women's Hall of Fame in 1985.

== Sources ==
- Denver Botanic Gardens (1973). Annual Report.
- Riley, Marilyn Griggs (2006). High Altitude Attitudes: Six Savvy Colorado Women. Big Earth Publishing. ISBN 1555663753.
- Varnell, Jeanne (1999). Women of Consequence: The Colorado Women's Hall of Fame. Big Earth Publishing. ISBN 1555662145.
- Wood, Richard E. (2005). Here Lies Colorado: Fascinating Figures in Colorado History. Farcounty Press. ISBN 1560373342.
