= Vincent Duffey =

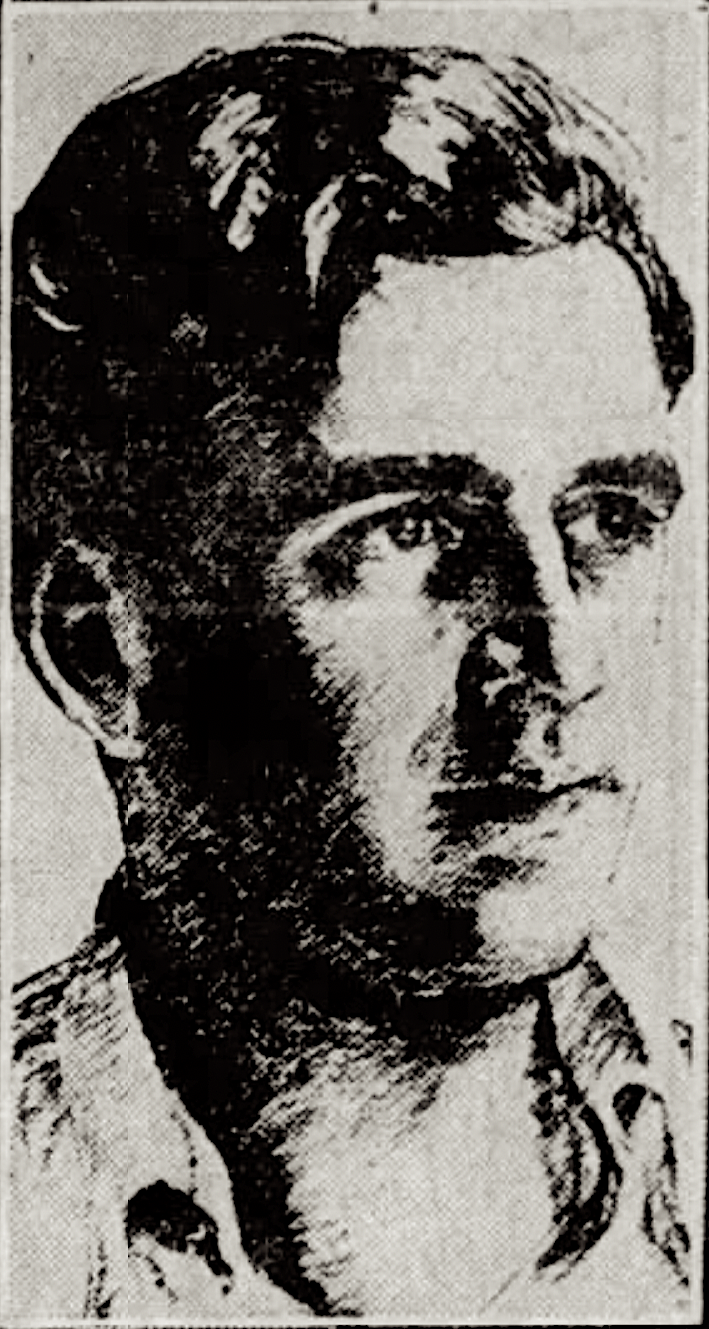
Vincent Duffey

Vincent Edward Duffey (19 June 1893 - 20 October 1951) was an American playwright, actor, stage director, and lighting designer. He is best known for co-authoring two plays staged on Broadway, The Mystery Man (1928) and The Greatest Show on Earth (1938).

== Life and career ==
The son of longtime Bohemian Grove lighting designer J. E. Duffey, Vincent Edward Duffey was born in San Francisco, California on 19 June 1893. In 1911 he graduated from Berkeley High School. He was educated further at the University of California. He served in the United States Navy during World War I. After the war he worked as a lighting designer in San Francisco. In 1920 he was the lead male actor opposite Nina Moise in a production of Pendleton King's Cocaine in Los Angeles. By 1923 he was well known in L.A. as a stage director, actor, lighting designer, and playwright. After the death of his father in 1923 he succeeded him as the resident lighting designer at Bohemian Grove.

With Morris Ankrum, Duffey co-authored the play The Mystery Man which was produced and directed by Gustav Blum at Broadway's Nora Bayes Theatre in 1928. Duffey's play The Greatest Show on Earth was co-authored with Irene Alexander. It premiered on Broadway at the Playhouse Theatre on January 5, 1938. It ran there for a total of 29 performances; closing on January 29, 1938.

Duffey worked as a dialect coach for films in Hollywood. He also was a member of the Bohemian Club in San Francisco.

He died of heart disease at Saint Francis Hospital in San Francisco, California on 20 October 1951.
