= Joyce Meskis =

American bookseller (1942–2022)

- Born: March 12, 1942
- Died: December 22, 2022 (aged 80)
- Education: Purdue University
- Occupation: Bookseller

Joyce Meskis (March 12, 1942 – December 22, 2022) was an American bookseller. She owned the Tattered Cover bookstore from 1974. In 1995, she won a PEN/Newman’s Own First Amendment Award.

== Life ==
Meskis studied at Purdue University.

In 1974, she bought the Tattered Cover bookstore. In 1991, she was president of the American Booksellers Association. She retired in 2015.

Meskis had two daughters. Meskis died on December 22, 2022, at the age of 80.
