= The Greatest Show on Earth (play) =

The Greatest Show on Earth is a comedy in three acts by Vincent Duffey and Irene Alexander. Set in a circus, the actors in this show portray animals longing to escape into the wild natural world. It premiered on Broadway at the Playhouse Theatre on January 5, 1938. It ran there for a total of 29 performances; closing on January 29, 1938. The cast included Edgar Stehli as Slimy the snake, Margaret Perry as Kitty, Dorothy Patten as Princess, John Alexander as Rajah the elephant, Anthony Ross as Leo the lion, Frank Lovejoy as Laddie, Alice Belmore Cliffe as Scheherazade the elephant, and Alan Handley as Adonis. The production was produced by Helen Bonfils and her husband George Somnes. Somnes also staged the production.
