= The Long, Long Trailer =

1954 film by Vincente Minnelli

- Theatrical release poster
- Directed by: Vincente Minnelli
- Screenplay by: Albert Hackett; Frances Goodrich
- Based on: The Long, Long Trailer (1951 novel) by Clinton Twiss
- Produced by: Pandro S. Berman
- Starring: Lucille Ball; Desi Arnaz; Marjorie Main; Keenan Wynn
- Cinematography: Robert Surtees
- Edited by: Ferris Webster
- Music by: Adolph Deutsch
- Production company: Metro-Goldwyn-Mayer
- Distributed by: Loew's Inc.
- Release date: February 18, 1954
- Running time: 96 minutes
- Language: English
- Budget: $1.5 million
- Box office: $4 million

The Long, Long Trailer is a 1954 American romantic comedy road film directed by Vincente Minnelli from a screenplay by Albert Hackett and Frances Goodrich, based on the 1951 novel of the same name by Clinton Twiss. Shot in Ansco Color, the film stars Lucille Ball and Desi Arnaz as a newlywed couple who buy a new travel trailer home for their honeymoon and experience a series of mishaps as they travel from California to Colorado. It also features Marjorie Main, Keenan Wynn, Bert Freed, Moroni Olsen, Gladys Hurlbut, Madge Blake, Howard McNear, and Walter Baldwin.

== Plot ==
Nicholas "Nicky" Collini lands a new job as a civil engineer that will require constant travel. His fiancée Tacy proposes buying a trailer so that they can travel together to his various work assignments, while saving money that would otherwise be spent on a house. She suggests that they haul the trailer themselves to Nicky's first job site in Colorado, as part of their honeymoon trip through the Sierra Nevada mountains. Nicky reluctantly agrees.

At a trailer show, Tacy becomes instantly fascinated by a large trailer home and persuades Nicky to buy it. Although the trailer is over their budget, Nicky gives in. The Collinis then learn that to tow the trailer, they will have to buy a new powerful car and a trailer hitch, and the expenses continue to rise. Tacy and Nick get married, and as they leave on their honeymoon, driving the convertible towing a huge trailer proves to be a challenge for the inexperienced Nick. During their journey, Nicky reveals he has put the trailer in Tacy's name as a wedding present.

Arriving at a trailer park, the newlyweds are beset by friendly but overbearing neighbors who take over their trailer and finally leave after giving Tacy a sleeping pill. The next morning, Tacy convinces Nicky to leave the trailer park and spend a quiet night in the woods. However, after they turn onto an old logging road during a rainstorm, the trailer becomes stuck in the mud. The next day, after spending more money to tow out and wash the trailer, the Collinis visit Tacy's relatives. Nicky attempts to back the trailer into their hosts' carport, but destroys it as well as Tacy's aunt's prized rose bush. The next day, Tacy is upset when Nicky returns the check her family gave them as a wedding present, in order to cover the damages, and the couple depart.

As Tacy and Nicky continue their travels, she tries to make the trailer into a home, and collects dozens of mason jars full of fruits and vegetables, as well as large rocks to decorate their patio when they arrive at their ultimate destination in Colorado. One day, Tacy decides that she wants to drive, but after Nicky criticizes her for fast and reckless driving, Tacy furiously jumps in the back seat and gives him the silent treatment. The fight continues that evening as neither one wants to sleep with the other in the bedroom, and they squabble about who will sleep in the living room, but they later make up.

The next afternoon, Tacy decides to cook an elaborate dinner in the trailer while Nicky drives the car, hoping to have dinner ready once he parks for the night. However, the ride proves to be rough, and the dinner ends up ruined. After that disaster, Nicky decides to accept a cash offer on the trailer, hoping he and Tacy can move into an actual house, but she is determined to keep the trailer and refuses to sell it.

That evening, Nicky orders Tacy to dispose of her collection of heavy rocks and jars before they make a perilous drive on a steep, narrow road through mountains that rise to an elevation of 8,000 feet (2,400 m). Tacy, reluctant to part with what she considers precious memories of their honeymoon, hides the items throughout the trailer. As they undertake the harrowing mountain drive, everything Tacy has hidden rolls around inside the trailer. When they reach the top of the 8,000-foot mountain, the trailer, weighed down by Tacy's possessions, becomes stuck and its wheels spin. Nicky discovers the rocks and jars, and in a rage, throws the items off the mountaintop, ignoring Tacy's pleas for him to stop.

Weeks later, as their marriage deteriorates, Nicky meets up with Tacy as she prepares to sell the trailer and move back home. Nicky begins to apologize, but not knowing what to say, he leaves. As he drives away in the pouring rain, Tacy runs to catch up with him. The two forgive each other before returning to their trailer.

== Cast ==
- Lucille Ball as Tacy Collini
- Desi Arnaz as Nicholas Carlos "Nicky" Collini
- Marjorie Main as Mrs. Hittaway
- Keenan Wynn as policeman
- Gladys Hurlbut as Mrs. Bolton
- Moroni Olsen as Mr. Tewitt
- Bert Freed as Foreman
- Madge Blake as Aunt Anastacia
- Walter Baldwin as Uncle Edgar
- Herb Vigran as trailer salesman (uncredited)
- Emory Parnell as policeman (uncredited)

== Production ==
In May 1952, MGM purchased the film rights to Clinton Twiss' novel The Long, Long Trailer and June Allyson was considered the most likely candidate for the female lead role.

Opening scenes were shot on Metro-Goldwyn-Mayer's Stage 12, the same location at which Arnaz played his first film scene in Bataan (1943).

The trailer shown in the film is a 1953 36-foot Redman New Moon model, which sold for US$5,345 (equivalent to $64,319 in 2025). The car towing the trailer is a 1953 Mercury Monterey convertible with a 125-HP flathead V8 engine.

The dangerous mountain highway featured is Whitney Portal Road, which leads up to Mount Whitney in the Sierra Nevada mountains in California. The hairpin turn offers scenic views of the Owens Valley. During the scenes of Nicky and Tacy pulling their trailer in the mountains, their 1953 Mercury Monterey convertible is replaced with a larger but similar 1953 Lincoln Capri convertible. The distinct Lincoln grille is clearly evident in a shot as the car rounds a curve. The more powerful Lincoln (which is equipped with a 205-HP OHV Y-block V8 engine) was needed to pull the heavy trailer up and over the steep grades of the Sierra Nevada where the scenes were filmed. Other scenes were shot on the Pines to Palms Scenic Byway (State Route 74) in Palm Desert, California.

== Reception ==
According to Turner Classic Movies host Robert Osborne, the studio was unsure whether The Long, Long Trailer would be a success because it was thought that audiences would not pay money to see Lucille Ball and Desi Arnaz in a film when they could watch the couple on television for free (I Love Lucy). Arnaz made a $25,000 bet with the studio that the film would make more money than the current highest-grossing comedy at that time, Father of the Bride, starring Spencer Tracy and Elizabeth Taylor and also directed by Vincente Minnelli. Arnaz won the bet. The characters Nicky and Tacy were remarkably similar to Ricky and Lucy; thus, the film gave audiences an opportunity to see Arnaz and Ball in color when I Love Lucy was in black and white.

According to MGM records, the film earned $3,978,000 in the United States and Canada and $1,007,000 elsewhere, resulting in a profit of $3,550,000.

The film was a return to MGM by Ball, who had felt underused by the studio when she was under contract in the 1940s, according to Michael Feinstein, who hosted a TCM showing of the film. She was given Lana Turner's old dressing room and Desi was given Clark Gable's.

== Home media ==
The Long, Long Trailer was released on VHS in 1982, and again in 1990 by MGM/UA Home Video and Turner Entertainment. It was released on DVD in 2006, this time by Warner Home Video in Region 1 coding for the US and Canada. It was released as a single disc and as a part of a three-DVD set featuring two other Ball–Arnaz films, Too Many Girls (1940) and Forever, Darling (1956). The film was also released in Region 4 coding for Australia. It was released on Blu-ray by the Warner Archive Collection in January 2023.

== In popular culture ==
The film is referenced in the They Might Be Giants song "Everything Right Is Wrong Again" which contains the lyrics "Everything right is wrong again / Just like in The Long, Long Trailer / All the dishes got broken / The car kept driving / And nobody would stop to save her".
