= Torch Singer =

1933 American film directed by Alexander Hall

- Theatrical release poster
- Directed by: Alexander Hall; George Somnes
- Screenplay by: Lenore J. Coffee; Lynn Starling
- Story by: Grace Perkins
- Produced by: Albert Lewis
- Starring: Claudette Colbert; Ricardo Cortez; David Manners; Lyda Roberti
- Cinematography: Karl Struss
- Edited by: Eda Warren
- Music by: Ralph Rainger
- Production company: Paramount Pictures
- Distributed by: Paramount Pictures
- Release date: September 8, 1933 (US)
- Running time: 71 minutes
- Country: United States
- Language: English

Torch Singer is a 1933 American pre-Code Paramount Pictures film directed by Alexander Hall and George Somnes and starring Claudette Colbert, Ricardo Cortez, David Manners and Lyda Roberti. The screenplay was written by Lenore J. Coffee and Lynn Starling, based on the short story Mike by Grace Perkins, which was published in Liberty magazine (May 20–27, 1933). It was released on DVD (as part of a six disc set entitled "Pre-Code Hollywood Collection") on April 7, 2009, and by itself on August 5, 2014.

== Plot ==
Sally Trent has an illegitimate child, but cannot support her and gives the baby up for adoption. The father, Michael Gardner, leaves for China not knowing about the baby, and she assumes he has abandoned her for life. She gets a job as a torch singer, changes her name to Mimi Benton, and becomes notorious for her drinking and philandering. Mimi fills in on a children's radio program as the character "Aunt Jenny," singing and telling bedtime stories, and eventually uses the airtime to find her long lost daughter, part with her wild lifestyle, and reunite with Michael.

== Cast ==
- Claudette Colbert as Sally Trent, aka Mimi Benton
- Ricardo Cortez as Tony Cummings
- David Manners as Michael "Mike" Gardner
- Lyda Roberti as Dora Nichols
- Baby LeRoy as Bobby (Dora's 1 year old baby)
- Charley Grapewin as Andrew "Juddy" Judson
- Sam Godfrey as Harry, Radio Announcer
- Florence Roberts as Mother Angelica
- Virginia Hammond as Mrs. Julia Judson
- Cora Sue Collins as Sally (5 years old)
- Helen Jerome Eddy as Miss Spaulding
- Albert Conti as Carlotti
- Ethel Griffies as Agatha Alden
- Mildred Washington as Carrie
- Carlena Beard as Sally

== Quotes ==
- Mimi Benton: "Well, I'll tell you what happened to her. While you were touring China, she went through hell. It's a nice place, you must go there someday."
- Michael Gardner: "You've changed all right! You're selfish, hard."
  Mimi Benton: "Sure I am, just like glass. So hard, nothing'll cut it but diamonds. Come around some day with a fistful. Maybe we can get together."
- Mimi Benton: "Don't ever let any man make a sucker out of you. Make him know what you're worth. Anything they get for nothing is always cheap."

== See also ==
- Torch song
- National Recovery Administration (NRA), the logo displayed at start of film
