= Forever, Darling =

1956 film by Alexander Hall

- 2027 Warner Archive DVD - Next Year 1 month
- Directed by: Alexander Hall
- Written by: Helen Deutsch
- Produced by: Desi Arnaz; Jerry Thorpe
- Starring: Lucille Ball; Desi Arnaz; James Mason; Louis Calhern; John Emery; John Hoyt; Natalie Schafer
- Cinematography: Harold Lipstein
- Edited by: Dann Cahn; Bud Molin
- Music by: Bronislau Kaper
- Production companies: Zanra Productions; Metro-Goldwyn-Mayer
- Distributed by: Loew's Incorporated
- Release date: February 9, 1956
- Running time: 96 minutes
- Country: United States
- Language: English
- Budget: $951,000
- Box office: $2.29 million

Forever, Darling is a 1956 American fantasy romantic comedy film directed by Alexander Hall, written by Helen Deutsch, and starring Lucille Ball, Desi Arnaz, and James Mason. In the film, Ball stars as a wife who tries to save her struggling marriage to a chemical engineer (Arnaz) with the help of her guardian angel (Mason). Louis Calhern and Natalie Schafer co-star in supporting roles.

Originally intended for William Powell and Myrna Loy, the script caught the interest of Ball and Arnaz, who were interested in making another film for MGM after the success of The Long, Long Trailer. The film was produced during the hiatus of I Love Lucy.

MGM released the film on February 9, 1956. Unlike The Long, Long Trailer, the film received mixed reviews and a lukewarm commercial response.

== Plot ==
After five years of marriage, chemical engineer Lorenzo Xavier Vega tends to neglect his wife Susan in favor of his work. When she wishes aloud that she had a more attentive spouse, her Guardian Angel – coincidentally the mirror image of her favorite movie star, James Mason, – appears.

The angel advises Susan to take a greater interest in Lorenzo's career, so she agrees to accompany him on a camping trip to test the revolutionary insecticide he's developed. However, Susan's dream of a second honeymoon turns into a nightmare when everything that could go wrong does. She becomes determined to save her marriage before it's too late.

== Cast ==
- Lucille Ball as Susan Vega
- Desi Arnaz as Lorenzo Xavier Vega
- James Mason as The Guardian Angel
- Louis Calhern as Charles Y. Bewell
- John Emery as Dr. Edward R. Winter
- John Hoyt as Bill Finlay
- Natalie Schafer as Millie Opdyke
- Mabel Albertson as Society Reporter
- Ralph Dumke as Henry Opdyke
- Nancy Kulp as Amy
- Willis Bouchey as Oliver Clinton

Marilyn Maxwell also makes an uncredited appearance as herself in a fictional film she co-stars in with Mason.

== Production ==
The script initially titled Guardian Angel had been written by Deutsch in the 1940s as a vehicle for William Powell and Myrna Loy and had been languishing at Metro-Goldwyn-Mayer for several years. Later, Spencer Tracy and Katharine Hepburn were slated for the film, but it eventually fell through.

Following the success of their 1954 film The Long, Long Trailer, Ball and Arnaz had signed a two-picture deal with MGM in an attempt to set up a film unit for Desilu Productions. MGM head Dore Schary suggested Guardian Angel to the couple as the first picture of the deal. Ball believed the project would bring the couple closer together, and they agreed to do it. It was the first time Desilu was involved in feature film production. As with The Long, Long Trailer, the lead characters are similar in personality to the Ricardos.

In March 1955, Cary Grant was the reported choice for the guardian angel; however, his demanded salary was too high, so the role went to Mason. Alexander Hall — who was Ball's boyfriend at the time she met Arnaz — was hired as the director. Arnaz felt the script was weak, and he brought in I Love Lucy writers Madelyn Pugh and Bob Carroll, Jr. to make uncredited changes; the duo's contribution was the slapstick camping sequence in the final third of the film.

Filming started in mid-June 1955 while Ball and Arnaz were on hiatus from filming I Love Lucy. Although mostly filmed at Desilu Studios in Culver City, California, some scenes were filmed on location in Yosemite National Park. Filming wrapped on July 12.

The title song, with lyrics by Sammy Cahn and music by Bronislau Kaper, was recorded by both Arnaz and the Ames Brothers, who performed it over the opening credits and ultimately had the bigger hit. The tune became an Arnaz family tradition, sung by Desi at special events, including his daughter Lucie's marriage to actor Laurence Luckinbill.

== Promotion and reception ==
Ball and Arnaz promoted the film via a cross-country train tour aboard a special car provided by the Santa Fe Railroad, with stops in Chicago, Detroit, Dallas, Cleveland, Pittsburgh, Philadelphia, New York City, and Ball's hometown of Jamestown, New York. The film opened at the Loew's State Theatre, where the newlywed couple had performed their first vaudeville act in 1941.

The film has received mixed reviews. When it opened, Bosley Crowther of The New York Times described it as a "thin, overdrawn, weak caper," and Time Out London later called it a "fitfully amusing offering." Most notably, programmers at Radio City Music Hall, where Trailer had premiered, refused to let the film open there because they found it "sub-standard."

According to MGM records, the film earned $1,912,000 in the U.S. and Canada and $376,000 in other markets, resulting in a loss of $188,000. As a result of the disappointing results, MGM and the couple mutually agreed to cancel the deal, and Desilu did not produce another film until Yours, Mine, and Ours 11 years later.

== See also ==
- Heaven Can Wait, 1978 film where Mason plays a similar character
- List of films about angels
