= Edgar Stehli =

American actor

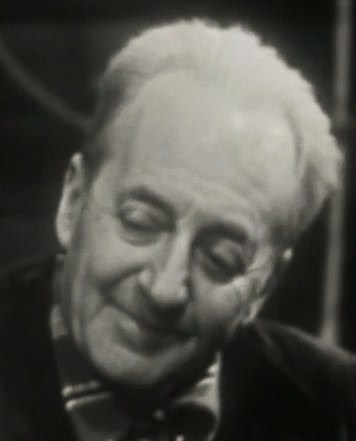
- Born: July 12, 1884; Lyon, Rhône, France
- Died: July 25, 1973 (aged 89); Upper Montclair, New Jersey, U.S.
- Education: Cornell University (BA, MA)
- Occupation: Actor
- Years active: 1940-1970

Edgar Stehli (July 12, 1884 – July 25, 1973) was a French-born American actor of the stage, the screen and television.

== Early years ==
The son of an English mother and a German-Swiss father, Stehli was born in Lyon, France. The family moved to New York in 1886 and later moved to Montclair, New Jersey. He graduated from Cornell University with a bachelor's degree in 1907 and a master's degree in 1908. While at Cornell, he acted in university theatrical productions.

== Career ==
Stehli's professional acting debut came with a stock theater company in Bayonne as he had understudy and bit-part responsibilities and worked with props. He worked there and with other stock companies until 1919, when he was invited to join the Theatre Guild. He starred in the 1938 Broadway production of The Greatest Show on Earth.

Stehli appeared in the films Boomerang; Executive Suite; Drum Beat; The Cobweb; The Brothers Karamazov; No Name on the Bullet; 4D Man; Cash McCall; Atlantis, the Lost Continent; Parrish; Pocketful of Miracles; The Spiral Road; Twilight of Honor; Seconds; The Tiger Makes Out and Loving, among others.

His television appearances include episodes of Dennis the Menace, Gunsmoke, Perry Mason, Alfred Hitchcock Presents, The Twilight Zone, Hazel, and The Texan(Western TV series starring Rory Calhoun.)

On old-time radio, Stehli portrayed Dr. Huer in Buck Rogers in the 25th Century, D.A. Miller in Crime Doctor, and the title character in Gramps.

Stehli's acting on Broadway spanned a half-century, beginning on November 27, 1916, in Six Who Pass While the Lentils Boil and ending on November 26, 1966, in Those That Play the Clowns. In 1941 he created the role of Dr. Einstein in Arsenic and Old Lace.

At the time of Stehli's death, he was one of the oldest active members of Actors' Equity Association.

== Personal life ==
Stehli was married to Emilie Greenough.

== Death ==
Stehli died on July 25, 1973, at his home in Upper Montclair, New Jersey, at age 89.

== Filmography ==
Year	Title	Role	Notes
1947	Boomerang	Ryan, the Coroner	uncredited
1954	Executive Suite	Julius Steigel	
1954	Drum Beat	Jesse Grant	
1955	The Cobweb	Mr. Holcomb	
1958	Alfred Hitchcock Presents	Herbert Johnson	Season 3 Episode 32: "Listen, Listen...!"
1958	The Brothers Karamazov	Grigory	
1959	No Name on the Bullet	Judge Benson	
1959	4D Man	Dr. Theodore W. Carson	
1959	The Texan	Winthrop Davis	https://www.youtube.com/watch?v=-X2ijqNizh4
1960	One Step Beyond	Grandpa	Season 2 Episode 38: "Goodbye Grandpa"
1960	Cash McCall	Mr. Pierce	
1961	Atlantis, the Lost Continent	King Kronas	voice dubbed by Paul Frees
1961	Parrish	Tully	uncredited
1961	Pocketful of Miracles	Gloomy	uncredited
1962	The Spiral Road	The Sultan	
1963	Twilight of Honor	Judge James Tucker	
1966	Seconds	Tailor Shop Presser	
1967	The Tiger Makes Out	Old Man	
1970	Loving	Mr. Kramm	final film role
