= The Girl in 419 =

1933 film by Alexander Hall

- Theatrical release poster
- Directed by: Alexander Hall; George Somnes
- Screenplay by: Allen Rivkin; Manuel Seff; P.J. Wolfson
- Produced by: B. P. Schulberg
- Starring: James Dunn; Gloria Stuart; David Manners; William Harrigan; Shirley Grey; Jack La Rue; Johnny Hines
- Cinematography: Karl Struss
- Music by: John Leipold
- Production company: Paramount Pictures
- Distributed by: Paramount Pictures
- Release date: May 26, 1933
- Running time: 67 minutes
- Country: United States
- Language: English

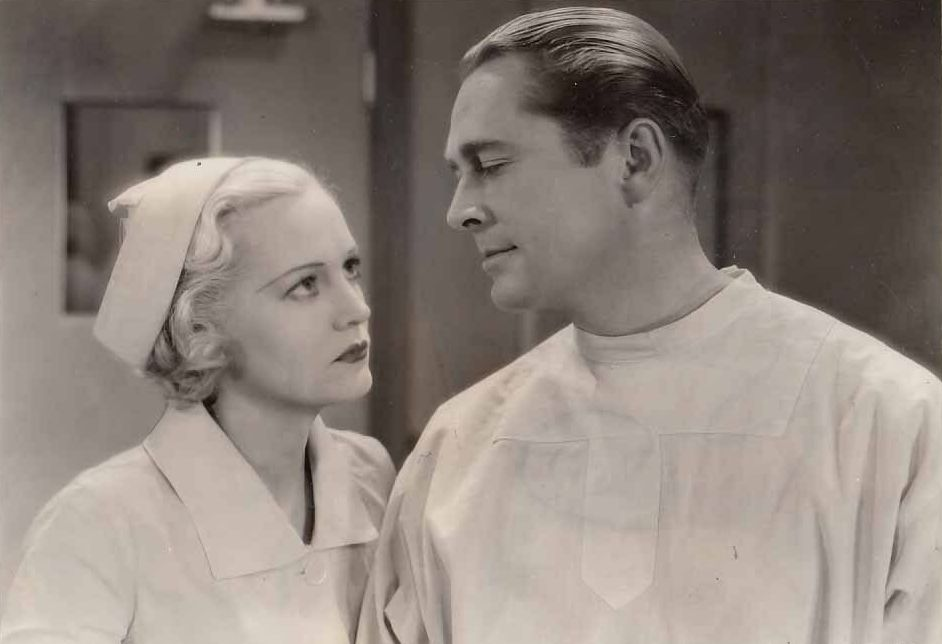
Gloria Stuart and James Dunn in a publicity photo

The Girl in 419 is a 1933 American pre-Code drama film directed by Alexander Hall and George Somnes and written by Allen Rivkin, Manuel Seff and P.J. Wolfson. The film stars James Dunn, Gloria Stuart, David Manners, William Harrigan, Shirley Grey and Jack La Rue. The film was released on May 26, 1933, by Paramount Pictures.

== Cast ==
- James Dunn as Dr. Daniel French
- Gloria Stuart as Mary Dolan
- David Manners as Dr. Martin Nichols
- William Harrigan as Peter Lawton
- Shirley Grey as Nurse Irene Blaine
- Jack La Rue as Sammy
- Johnny Hines as Slug
- Vince Barnett as Otto Hoffer
- Kitty Kelly as Kitty
- Edward Gargan as Lt. 'Babs' Riley
- James Burke as Detective Jackson
- Clarence Wilson as Walter C. Horton
- Gertrude Short as Lucy
- Effie Ellsler as Mrs. Young
- Hal Price as Rankin
