= Midnight Club (film) =

1933 film by George Somnes

- Directed by: Alexander Hall; George Somnes
- Screenplay by: Leslie Charteris; Seton I. Miller
- Based on: Gangster's Glory by E. Phillips Oppenheim
- Produced by: Bayard Veiller
- Starring: Clive Brook; George Raft; Helen Vinson; Alan Mowbray
- Cinematography: Theodor Sparkuhl
- Edited by: Eda Warren
- Music by: W. Franke Harling; Howard Jackson
- Production company: Paramount Pictures
- Distributed by: Paramount Pictures
- Release date: July 29, 1933
- Running time: 64 minutes
- Country: United States
- Language: English

Midnight Club is a 1933 American pre-Code crime drama film about a gang of London jewel thieves infiltrated by an undercover agent (George Raft). The film was directed by Alexander Hall and George Somnes. Produced and distributed by Paramount Pictures, it is based on the 1931 short story Gangster's Glory by E. Phillips Oppenheim.

== Plot ==
A successful gang of jewel thieves are operating out a London nightclub, using doubles to take their places in the nightspot while they are out committing crimes. The police commissioner calls in American detective Nick Mason to infiltrate the gang.

== Cast ==
- Clive Brook as Colin Grant
- George Raft as Nick Mason
- Helen Vinson as Iris Whitney
- Alison Skipworth as Lady Barrett-Smythe
- Sir Guy Standing as Commissioner Hope
- Alan Mowbray as Arthur Bradley
- Ferdinand Gottschalk as George Rubens
- Forrester Harvey as Thomas Roberts
- Ethel Griffies as The Duchess
- Teru Shimada as Nishi
- Charles Coleman as Carstairs
- Billy Bevan as Detective
- Jean De Briac as Headwaiter
- Leo White as Waiter
- Rita Carlyle as Nick's landlady
- Dennis O'Keefe as Dance Extra
