= Fairmount Mausoleum (Denver) =

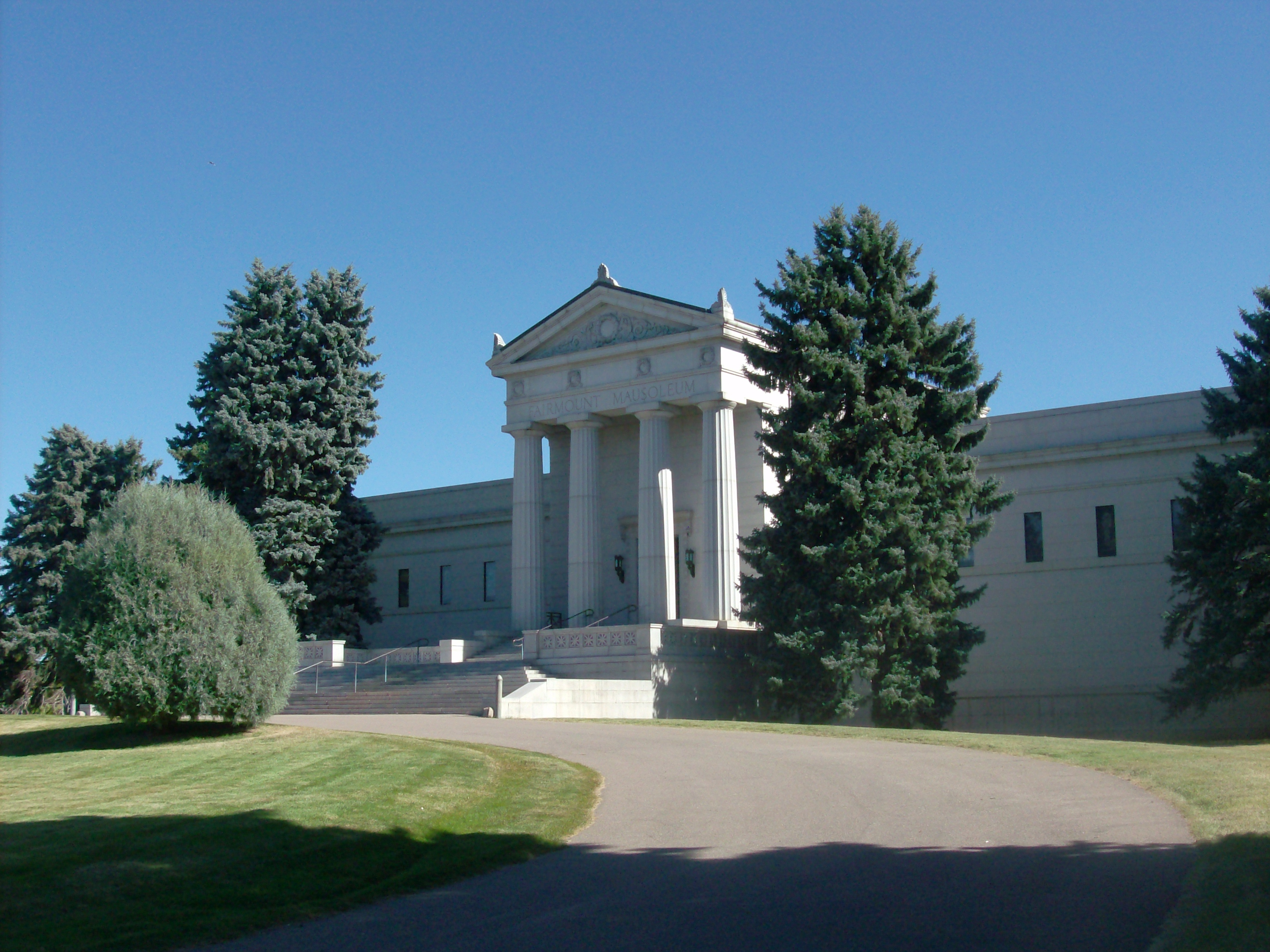
- The Fairmount Mausoleum at Fairmount Cemetery
- Interactive map of Fairmount Mausoleum

Details
- Location: Denver, Colorado
- Coordinates: 39°42′19″N 104°53′36″W
- Website: Fairmount Cemetery
- Find a Grave: Fairmount Mausoleum

Fairmount Mausoleum is a public mausoleum at Fairmount Cemetery in Denver, Colorado. The building was designed by architects Frederick E. Mountjoy and Francis W. Frewan. Constructed in 1929 and opened in 1930, the Fairmount Mausoleum contains the remains of more than 17,000 people and houses one of the largest stained glass collections in the state of Colorado.

In 2005, the Fairmount Mausoleum was listed as an official historic landmark by the City of Denver.

== Notable interments ==
- Charles Boettcher (1852–1948) businessman and philanthropist
- Frederick Gilmer Bonfils (1860–1933) co-founder of The Denver Post
- Helen Bonfils (1889–1972) businesswoman and philanthropist
- Charles Gates, Sr. (1877–1961) founder of Gates Rubber Company
- Edwin C. Johnson (1884–1970) Colorado Governor and U.S. Senator
- William Lee Knous (1889–1959) Colorado Governor
- Donald Meek (1878–1946) popular character actor
- Eugene Donald Millikin (1891–1958) U.S. Senator
- Frederick E. Mountjoy (1870–1941) architect, co-designer of the Fairmount Mausoleum
- Lawrence Cowle Phipps (1862–1958) U.S. Senator
- Florence Rena Sabin (1871–1953) American medical scientist
- Karl Cortlandt Schuyler (1877–1933) U.S. Senator
- George Somnes (1887–1956) theatre and film director and producer, husband of Helen Bonfils
