= Tattered Cover =

Bookstore chain in Colorado bought by Barnes & Noble, United States

Coordinates: 39°44′23″N 104°57′23″W

Tattered Cover Book Store, Inc.

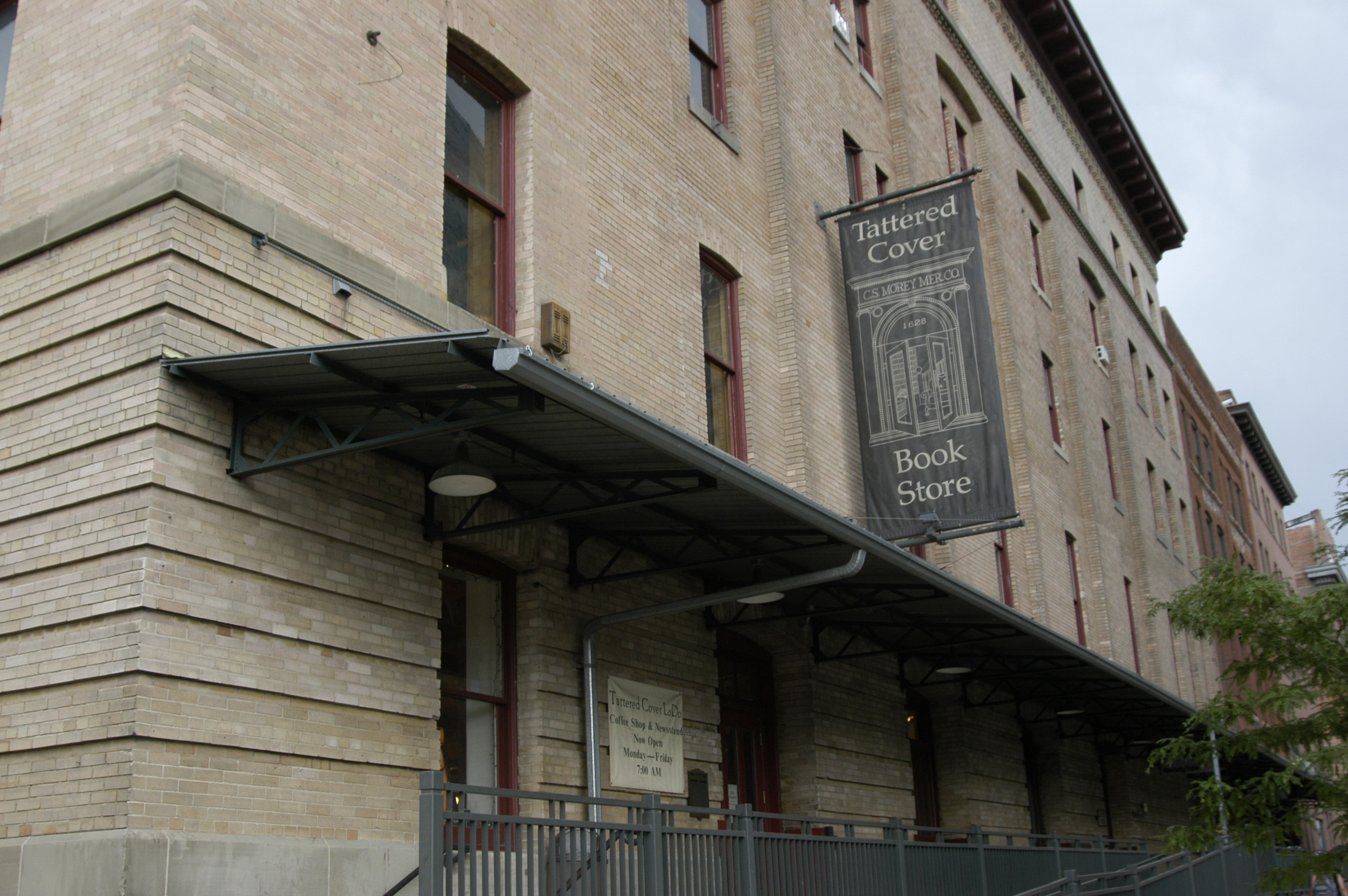
- 16th St. location
- Type: Private
- Industry: Retail
- Founded: 1971; 55 years ago
- Founder: Stephen Cogil
- Headquarters: 1628 16th Street; Denver, Colorado, U.S. 80202-1308
- Number of locations: 6
- Area served: Denver
- Products: Books
- Owners: Barnes & Noble (owned by Elliott Advisors Limited)
- Website: tatteredcover.com

Tattered Cover is a bookstore chain in Denver, Colorado. It was one of the largest independent bookstores in the United States. In July 2024, Tattered Cover became part of Barnes & Noble. Tattered Cover is open seven days a week at all branches, hosts prominent book signings, and is known for its customer service. Together, the stores maintain an inventory of over half a million books. Its LoDo store houses an events space that can seat over 250 persons, while its East Colfax store can seat around 100.

== History ==
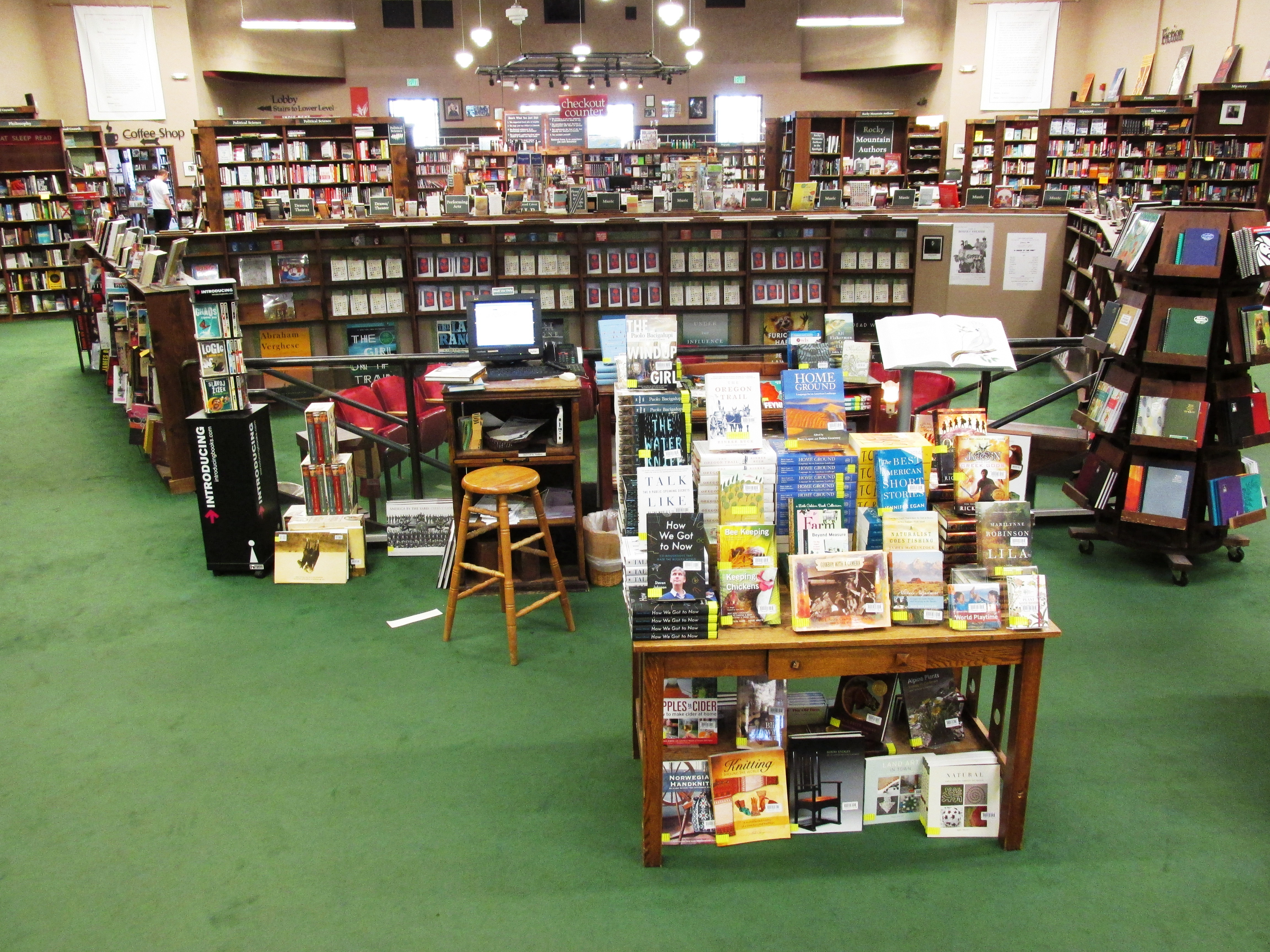
Interior of the East Colfax Avenue location, a former theatre (2016)

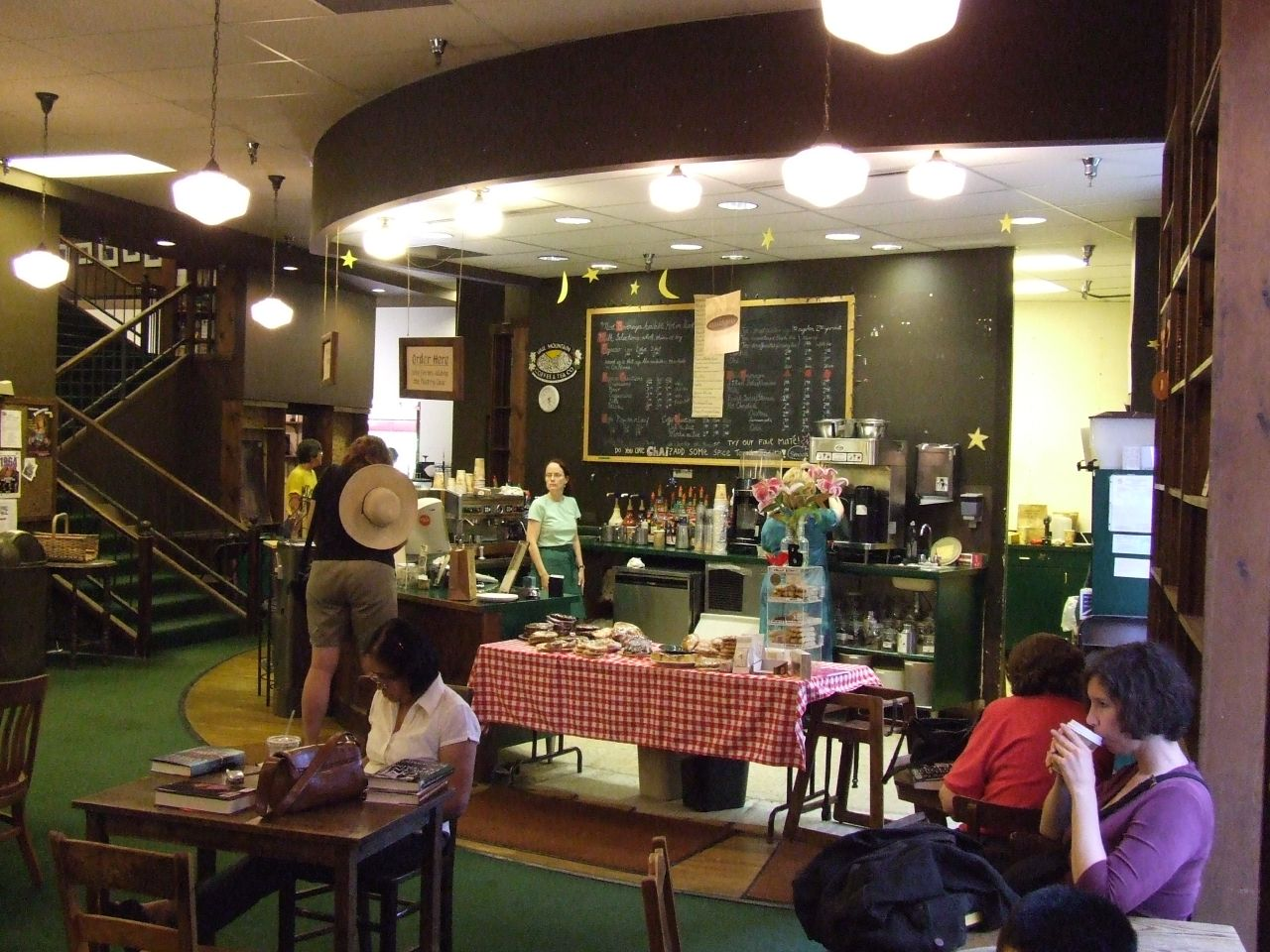
The first floor Coffee Shop at the Cherry Creek location (2006)

Tattered Cover opened in 1971 in the Cherry Creek district of Denver as a small 950 sq ft (88 m^{2}) bookshop. The original owner was Stephen Cogil, an Aurora native who became a Bookstore Consultant. It was purchased in 1974 by Joyce Meskis. Between 1973 and 1983, it expanded seven times, and in 1986 it moved into and consolidated at a new location in the Cherry Creek neighborhood, which remained open for over 20 years.

A second location was renovated and opened for business in 1994 in Denver's historic LoDo (lower downtown) district. In 1995, the Fourth Story Restaurant & Bar opened at the Cherry Creek location. In November 2004, a third location opened in Highlands Ranch. In April 2015, that store relocated to Littleton. The Cherry Creek location closed in June 2006 and moved to the newly renovated, long-defunct Lowenstein Theatre on Elizabeth Street at East Colfax Avenue in Denver. The Fourth Story restaurant did not move to that location and closed in 2006.

Like many independent bookstores, Tattered Cover is a member of the American Booksellers Association, and Meskis served as president of that organization in the early 1990s. Meskis is a former board member of the American Booksellers Foundation for Free Expression and is also the recipient of The William J. Brennan, Jr. Award from The Thomas Jefferson Center for the Protection of Free Expression, the PEN/Newman First Amendment Award, the Brandeis Award from Privacy International, and the American Library Association's John Phillip Immroth Memorial Award for Intellectual Freedom.

Meskis announced the sale of the bookstore in 2015 to Len Vlahos and Kristen Gilligan. In December 2020, Vlahos and Gilligan sold the company to a group of investors led by David Back and Kwame Spearman. On October 16, 2023, Tattered Cover filed for Chapter 11 bankruptcy, and announced that three stores would close and 27 staff would be laid off. Sale to Barnes & Noble was approved by a bankruptcy court in July 2024.

=== Colorado Supreme Court case ===
In 2000 the store resisted, on First Amendment grounds, a search warrant for records related to purchases made by a customer suspected of illegally manufacturing methamphetamine. The case made national news, and was eventually decided in the store's favor by the Colorado Supreme Court. Investigators were attempting to establish a connection between a suspect and books found on his premises how to manufacture the drug. The purchase in question was later revealed to be of a book on Japanese calligraphy.
