= Alexander Hall (director) =

American film director (1894–1968)

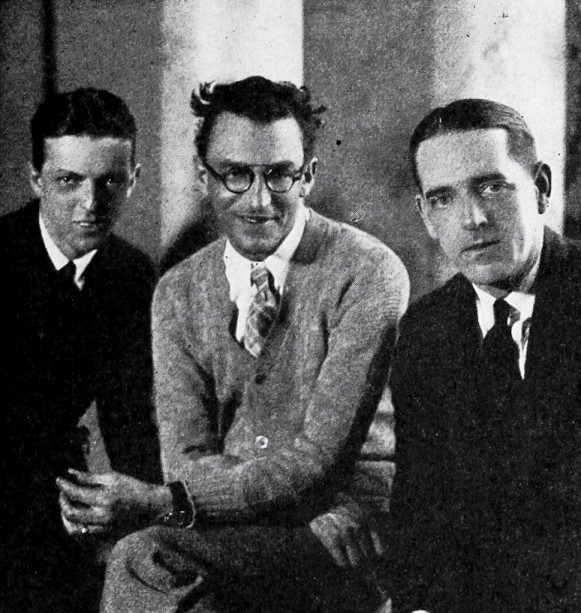
- Hall at left in a still from The Heart of a Siren (1925), where he was the assistant director
- Born: January 11, 1894; Boston, Massachusetts, US
- Died: July 30, 1968 (aged 74); San Francisco, California, US
- Occupations: film director, theatre actor, and composer
- Spouse(s): Lola Lane (1934–1936); Marjorie Hunter (? – ?)
- Writing career
- Notable awards: Best Director – (nominee); 1941 Here Comes Mr. Jordan

Alexander Hall (January 11, 1894 – July 30, 1968) was an American film director, film editor and theater actor.

== Biography ==
Hall acted in the theater from the age of 4 through 1914, when he began to work in silent movies. Following his military service in World War I, he returned to Hollywood and pursued a career in film production. He worked as a film editor and assistant director at Paramount Pictures until 1932, when he directed his first feature film, Sinners in the Sun. From 1937 to 1947, he was a contract director at Columbia Pictures, where he earned a reputation for sophisticated comedies. He was nominated for the Academy Award for Best Director for Here Comes Mr. Jordan (1941).

From 1934 to 1936, Hall was married to actress Lola Lane. He was also married to Marjorie Hunter. In the late 1930s, he was engaged briefly to Lucille Ball, who left him when she met Desi Arnaz. Years later, the couple later hired him to direct their 1956 film Forever, Darling.

In 1952, Hall had a home in Palm Springs, California.

== Death ==
Hall died of complications from a stroke in San Francisco. He was survived by a son. He is buried at Woodlawn Cemetery, in the Bronx, New York.

== Partial filmography ==
- The Leech (1921)
- A Game of Craft (1922)
- The Heart of a Siren (1925)
- Miss Nobody (1926)
- The Crash (1928, editor)
- Song of the Flame (1930, editor)
- Kismet (1930, editor)
- Sinners in the Sun (1932)
- Madame Racketeer (1932)
- The Girl in 419 (1933)
- Midnight Club (1933)
- Torch Singer (1933)
- Limehouse Blues (1934)
- Little Miss Marker (1934)
- Miss Fane's Baby Is Stolen (1934)
- The Pursuit of Happiness (1934)
- Goin' to Town (1935)
- There's Always a Woman (1938)
- I Am the Law (1938)
- There's That Woman Again (1938)
- The Lady's from Kentucky (1939)
- Good Girls Go to Paris (1939)
- The Amazing Mr. Williams (1939)
- He Stayed for Breakfast (1940)
- This Thing Called Love (1940)
- Bedtime Story (1941)
- Here Comes Mr. Jordan (1941)
- My Sister Eileen (1942)
- They All Kissed the Bride (1942)
- She Wouldn't Say Yes (1945)
- Down to Earth (1947)
- The Great Lover (1949)
- Louisa (1950)
- Because You're Mine (1952)
- Let's Do It Again (1953)
- Forever, Darling (1956)
