= Wood–Morris–Bonfils House =

Historic house in Colorado, United States

- Wood-Morris-Bonfils house
- U.S. National Register of Historic Places
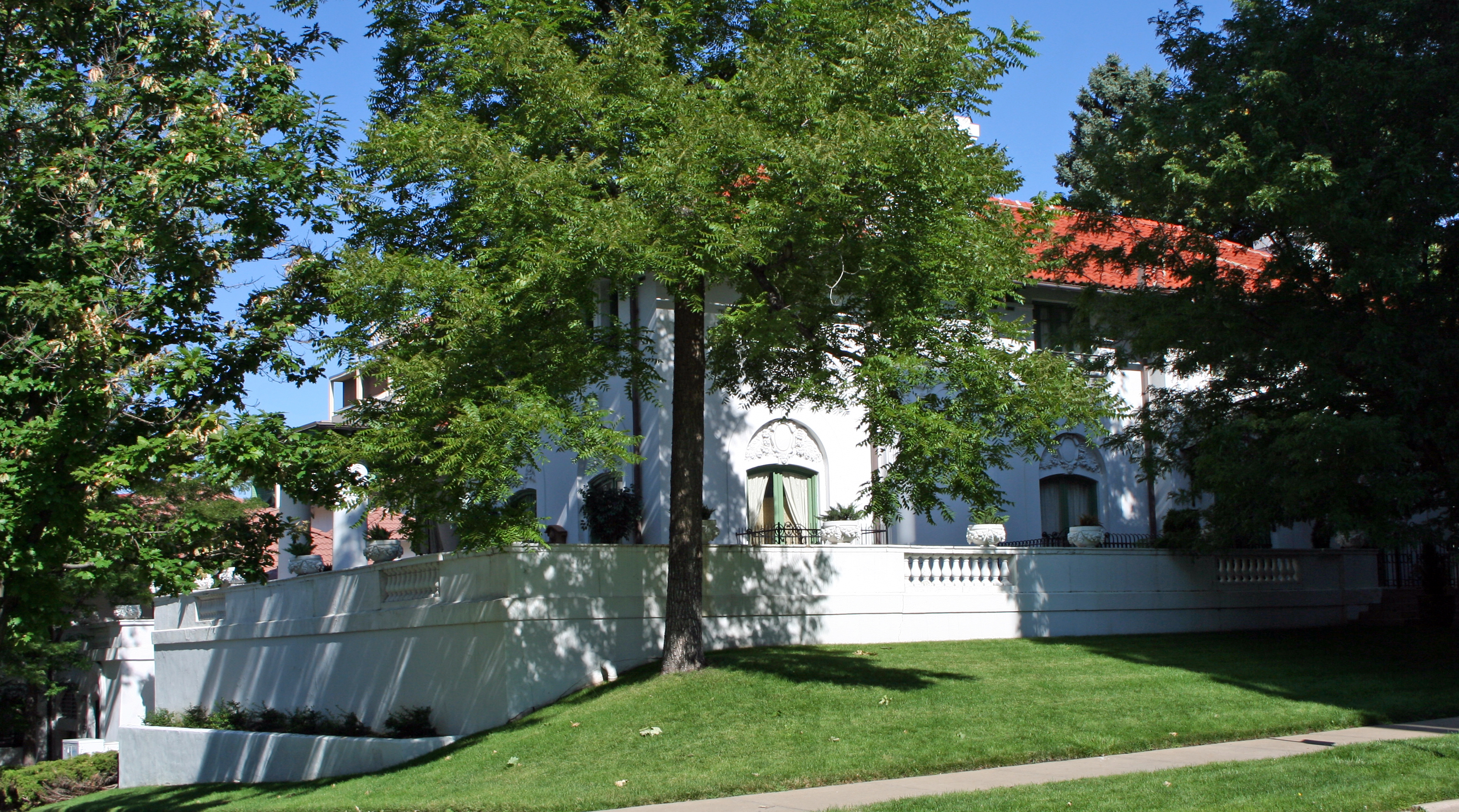
- Wood–Morris–Bonfils House in 2009

- Location within Colorado Location within the United States
- Location: 707 Washington St., Denver, Colorado
- Coordinates: 39°43′39″N 104°58′43″W
- Area: 1.4 acres (0.57 ha)
- Built: 1909 or 1911
- Architect: Biscoe & Hewitt
- Architectural style: Late 19th And 20th Century Revivals, French Mediterranean
- NRHP reference No.: 74000573
- Added to NRHP: December 4, 1974

The Wood–Morris–Bonfils house is a French Mediterranean Revival style house in the Capitol Hill neighborhood of Denver, Colorado.

It was built in 1909 or 1911. In 1974 it was listed on the National Register of Historic Places.

The house was the home of Guilford S. Wood, and later Andrew S. Hughes, and Helen Bonfils. In the early 1980s it housed the Mexican Consulate, and after 1985 was divided into condominiums.

The house was documented by the Historic American Buildings Survey in 1967.

== See also ==
- National Register of Historic Places listings in Downtown Denver
