= Frederick Gilmer Bonfils =

American businessman and publisher (1860–1933)

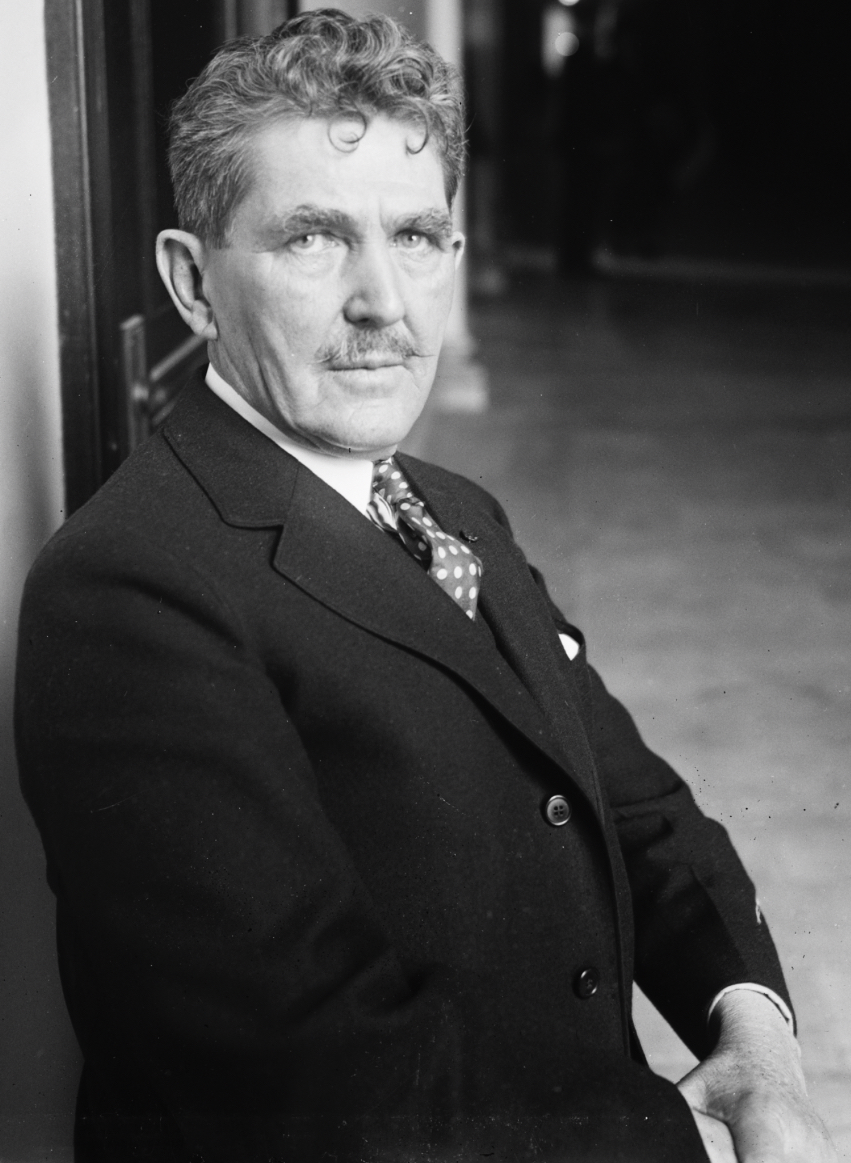
- Portrait of Bonfils by Harris & Ewing, 1924
- Born: December 31, 1860; Troy, Missouri, U.S.
- Died: February 2, 1933 (aged 72); Denver, Colorado, U.S.
- Resting place: Fairmount Mausoleum
- Occupations: Businessman; publisher
- Years active: 1886–1924
- Spouse: Belle Barton (m. 1882)
- Children: Helen; May

Frederick Gilmer "Bon" Bonfils (December 31, 1860 – February 2, 1933) was an American businessman and publisher who, alongside Harry Heye Tammen, co-owned The Denver Post. He was an early user of yellow journalism.

== Early life and business career ==
Bonfils was born on December 31, 1860, in Troy, Missouri, the second of eight children to lawyer and judge Eugene Napoleon Bonfils and Henrietta B. Lewis. Mayflower crew member John Alden was his 11th-great-grandfather. He was named after one "Dr. Frederick Gilmer".

In 1878, Bonfils entered the United States Military Academy, but dropped out in 1881 after being held back due to insufficient mathematics skills. For some time afterward, he found work at the Chemical Bank.

In 1886, Bonfils moved to Kansas City, Missouri, where he worked in the real estate business. During the Land Rush of 1889, he purchased rural land in Texas, near the border with Oklahoma, and advertised it for sale as "Oklahoma City, Texas", with "Texas" in small print to deceive buyers. He earned $15,000 by the time police ceased his operation. He then engaged in lotteries in Kansas City, Kansas, using various fake names to collect prizes. He was arrested twice for gambling, after which he left Kansas City.

== Journalism career ==
In December 1895, Bonfils moved to Denver. He met Harry Heye Tammen at the Windsor Hotel, where Tammen worked as a bartender. Tammen was also an editor of the Great-Divide Weekly Newspaper and an inauthentic skookum doll seller. Together, on October 28, 1895, they purchased The Denver Post—at the time called the Evening Post—for $12,500. They used yellow journalism to reach audiences; it made The Denver Post—which struggled financially before they bought it—the most profitable and most read newspaper in Denver. They justified their style of sensationalistic journalism with the quote "a dogfight on a Denver street is more important than a war in Europe". In their articles, they supported progressive views such as labor reform and anti-corruption.

In December 1899 or January 1900, Tammen and Bonfils were shot in their office by W. W. Anderson, an attorney representing cannibal Alfred Packer, after they published an article—written by Polly Pry—that had accused Packer of cannibalism. In the assault, Bonfils was shot once in the neck, and Tammen once in the chest. Anderson was tried three times, but never convicted. Though, Tammen and Bonfils were convicted for jury tampering in the third trial.

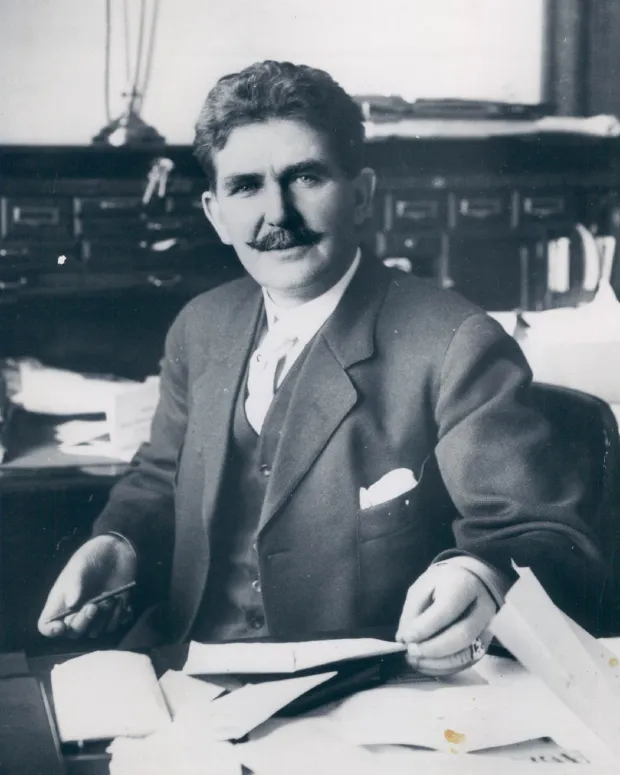
Bonfils in 1912

In 1902, Bonfils and Tammen bought the Sells Brothers Circus from Willie Sells and his brothers. Tammen rebranded the show to the Sells Floto Circus, after Otto Floto, the sportswriter of The Denver Post, who was involved in publicity work for the circus. Despite removing Sells and his brothers from the circus, Tammen continued using their likeness to sell it, which stopped in 1909, following a lawsuit by the Sells brothers.

In 1907, Thomas M. Patterson, publisher of the rival Rocky Mountain News, accused Bonfils of blackmail, which he responded to by assaulting Patterson. Bonfils pursued a lawsuit against the newspaper for the remainder of his life.

On October 29, 1909, Bonfils and Tammen bought the Kansas City Post, and owned it until selling it to Walter S. Dickey on May 18, 1922, for $250,000. Dickey also owned the competing The Kansas City Journal. Bonfils owned real estate and a lottery in Kansas City; the lottery was prized at $800,000 at one point.

In summer 1922, Bonfils accepted a $250,000 bribe from oilman Harry Ford Sinclair to not report on the Teapot Dome scandal. For this, a United States Senate hearing in 1924 suspended Bonfils from operating The Denver Post.

== Personal life ==
He married Belle Barton in 1882. They moved to Cañon City, Colorado, where Bonfils worked as a drill instructor for a military school. The couple had two daughters, Helen and May.

Physically, author Dick Kreck described Bonfils as "regarded as one of Denver's best-looking men". He had light blue eyes, curly dark hair, and was "athletically built". As for his personality, Kreck described him as a miser and in relentless pursuit of wealth. He was reportedly pugnacious, one time fighting an employee after being refused entry into the Missouri State Fair.

== Death and legacy ==
In February 1933, Bonfils had become bed-ridden in his Denver home due to an ear infection, and within the following days, he was encased in an oxygen tent. A baptist visited his house on February 1 and baptized him in bed. He died on February 2, aged 72, of encephalitis and pneumonia, and was interred in the Fairmount Mausoleum at Fairmount Cemetery, Denver.

His daughter, Helen, inherited $14,000,000 from him—plus another $10,000,000 from Bonfils' wife, Belle Barton.

The Bonfils Auditorium, in his birthplace of Troy, is named for him. The Bonfils Building, in Kansas City, is also named for him.
