= Congleton High School =

Secondary school in Cheshire, England

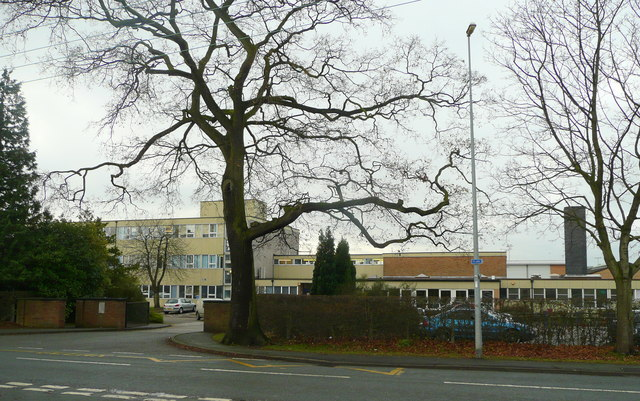
- Congleton High School in 2008

Location
- Box Lane; Congleton, Cheshire, CW12 4NS; England
- 53°09′56″N 2°14′51″W

Information
- Other name: CHS
- Type: Academy
- Motto: Together in the pursuit of excellence
- Established: 7 September 2000
- Local authority: Cheshire East Council
- Trust: The Learning Partnership Academies Trust
- Specialist: Engineering College
- Department for Education URN: 136655 Tables
- Ofsted: Reports
- Principal: Heidi Thurland
- Gender: Mixed
- Age range: 11–18
- Enrolment: 1,211
- Capacity: 1,236
- Website: www.congletonhigh.com

Congleton High School (CHS) is an 11–18 mixed secondary school and sixth form with academy status in Congleton, Cheshire, England. It has a specialism in engineering

== History ==
The school was formed after the reduction of the area's three schools to two larger schools (the previous schools being Dane Valley High School, Heathfield High School and Westlands High School).

In 2014 Congleton High School was awarded the Design Mark, the school received the award in recognition of its work as a specialist engineering school.

In 2022 Congleton High School applied for planning permission to expand, the planned expansion will add new classroom faculties and provide a new dining area for staff and students among other additions.

In March 2024 a new classroom block for humanities studies as well as new Hungry Bear refectory were officially opened, the humanities studies classroom block is named "The Machin Building" after Roland Machin MBE who was a teacher and governor at the school.

== See also ==
- Eaton Bank Academy
