= Congleton Museum =

Museum in Congleton, Cheshire, England

Coordinates: 53.1632°N 2.2105°W

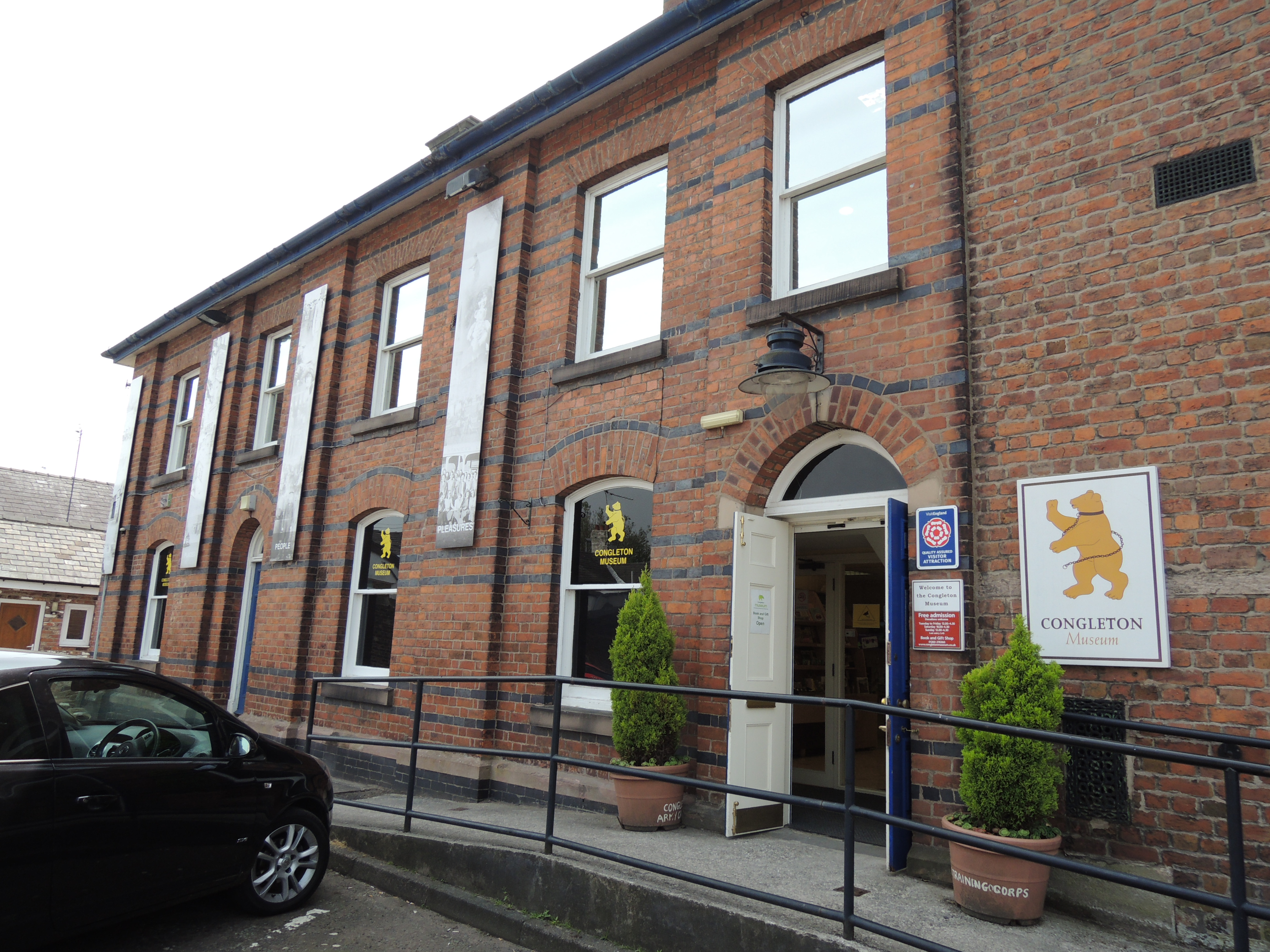
- Entrance to Congleton Museum
- Established: 29 July 2002
- Location: Congleton, Cheshire
- Type: Local
- Curator: Ian Doughty
- Website: Official website

Congleton Museum is a local museum in Congleton, Cheshire, northwest England, covering the history of the town of Congleton, which is situated on the banks of the River Dane. Congleton Museum Trust was established in 1985 by a group of people interested in local history. The museum is located in the Market square of Congleton.

== History ==
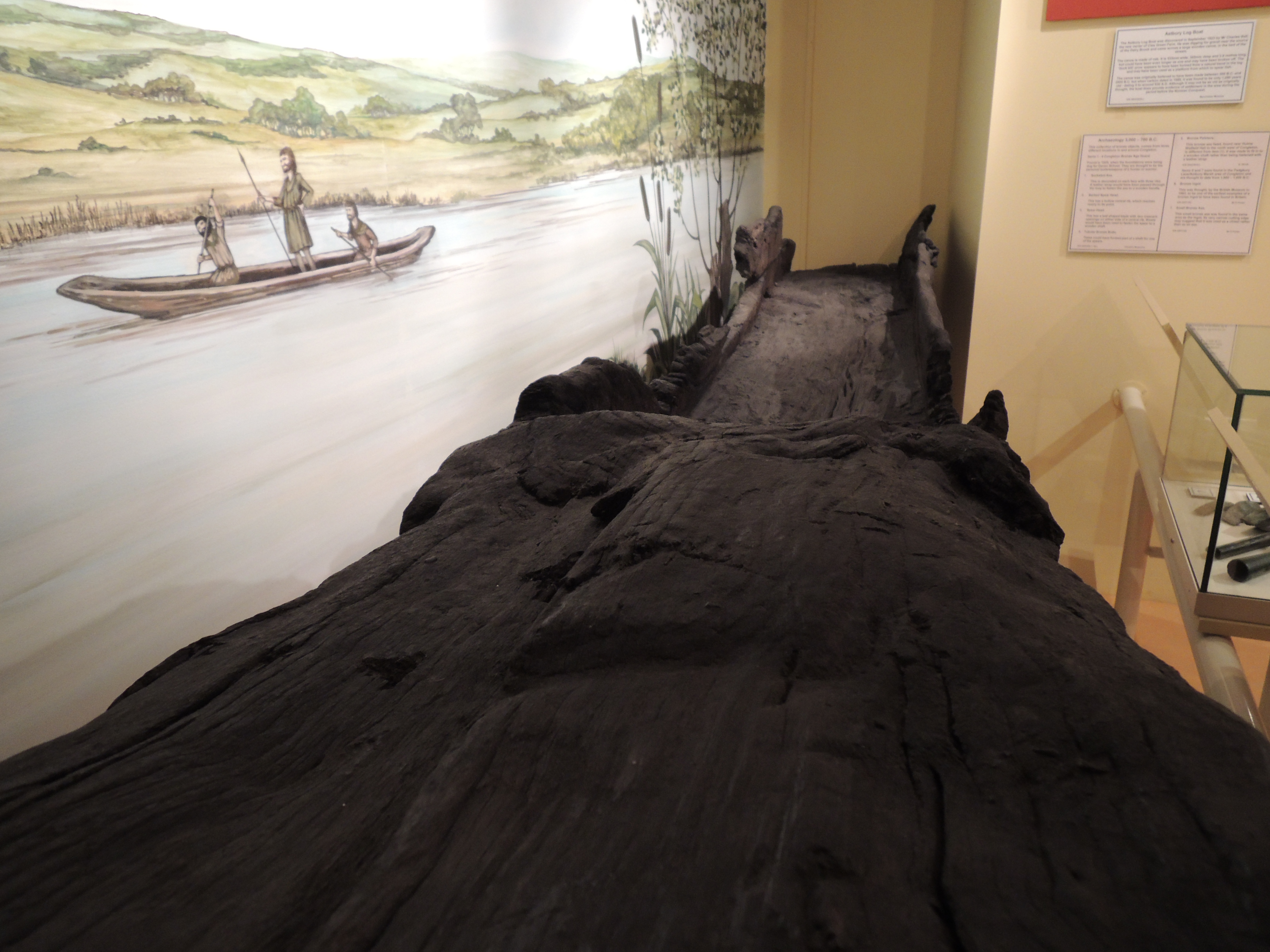
Astbury Log Boat

In 1985 a group of local people formed the Congleton Museum Trust. They collected artefacts, raised money and searched the town for premises suitable for a museum.

In the mid-1990s, a second group of people, who planned to refurbish Congleton Town Hall with the help of Regeneration Funding, became involved, and a museum was written into the refurbishment plans. The former police station, a Victorian building which was part of the town hall complex, was proposed as the museum.

The Heritage Lottery Fund awarded the project over £200,000, and other local and national trusts, businesses and local authorities assisted. Building work started in January 2002, and Congleton Museum opened on 29 July 2002.

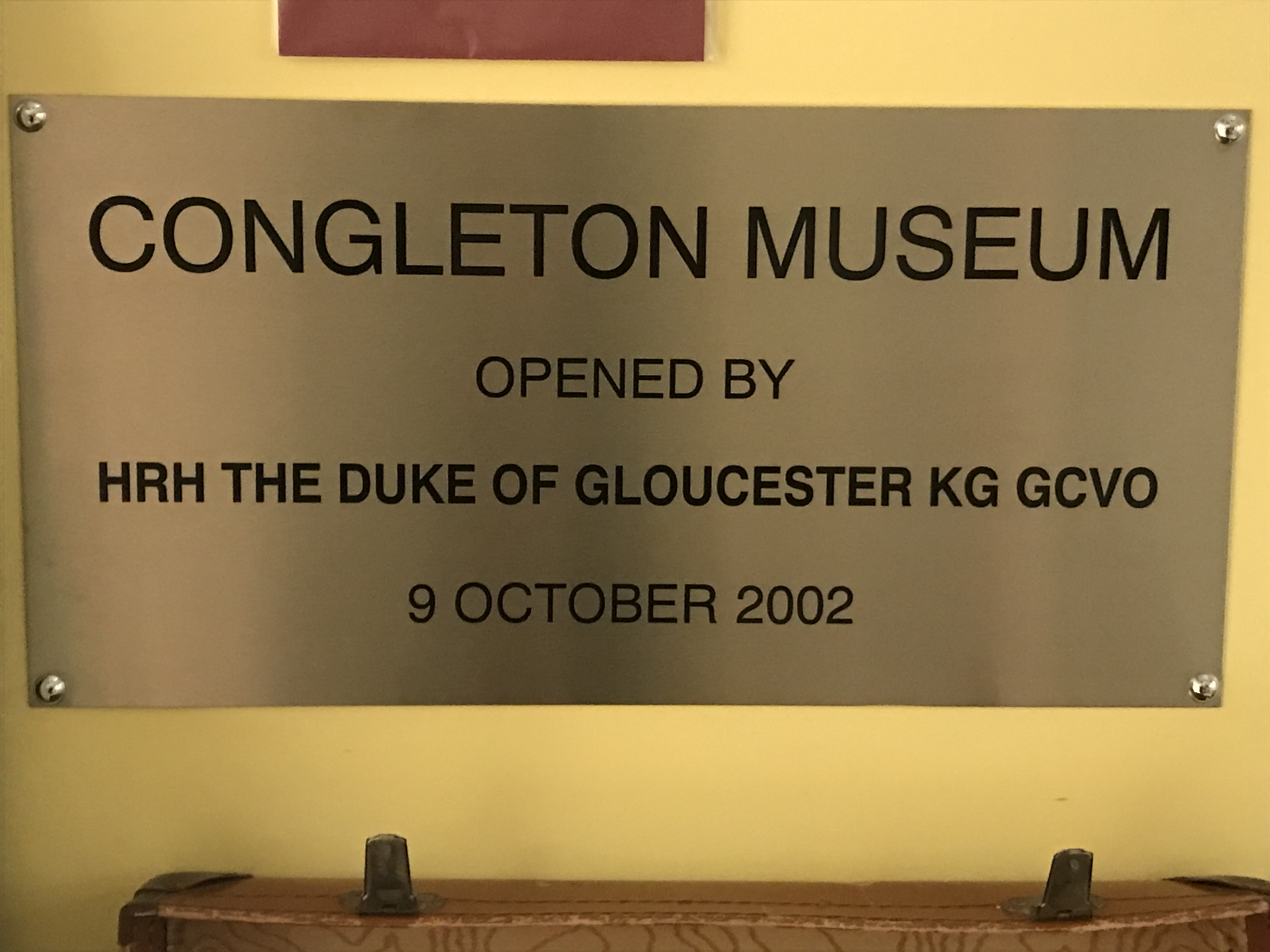
Plaque marking the date Congleton Museum was opened by the Duke of Gloucester

Congleton Museum was officially opened by the Duke of Gloucester on 9 October 2002.

In 2025 Congleton Museum was placed on Arts Council England's Museum At Risk register.

In December 2025 The Charity Commission opened an investigation into Congleton Museum, this happened following a "row" between members of the board of Trustees and concerns over the governance of the Museum.

== Collection and exhibits ==
The museum focuses on the history of Congleton and its immediate neighbourhood, with particular emphasis on prehistory, the Civil War, the Industrial age and World War II. The main display area is on the ground floor. On the first floor there is a research library and map collection and an education room. This is used for exhibitions, school visits, talks and social events. There are also showcases for the display of other items from the collection.

The museum's collection includes a 1500BC burial urn, a log boat from the 930AD, and two 17th century coin hoards. The museum houses tableaux illustrating life in the town during prehistoric times, in the Civil War, in the heyday of the textile industry and during the Second World War. Figures from the past tell their stories, and interactive computers fill in the background. Relief maps show the changes over the centuries. The Civil War was particularly significant to Congleton – a former mayor of the town, John Bradshaw, was first to sign Charles I's death warrant. A cannonball from that time, still embedded in a piece of wall from Biddulph Hall, is in the museum. There are frequent temporary exhibitions, often involving the work of local schools.

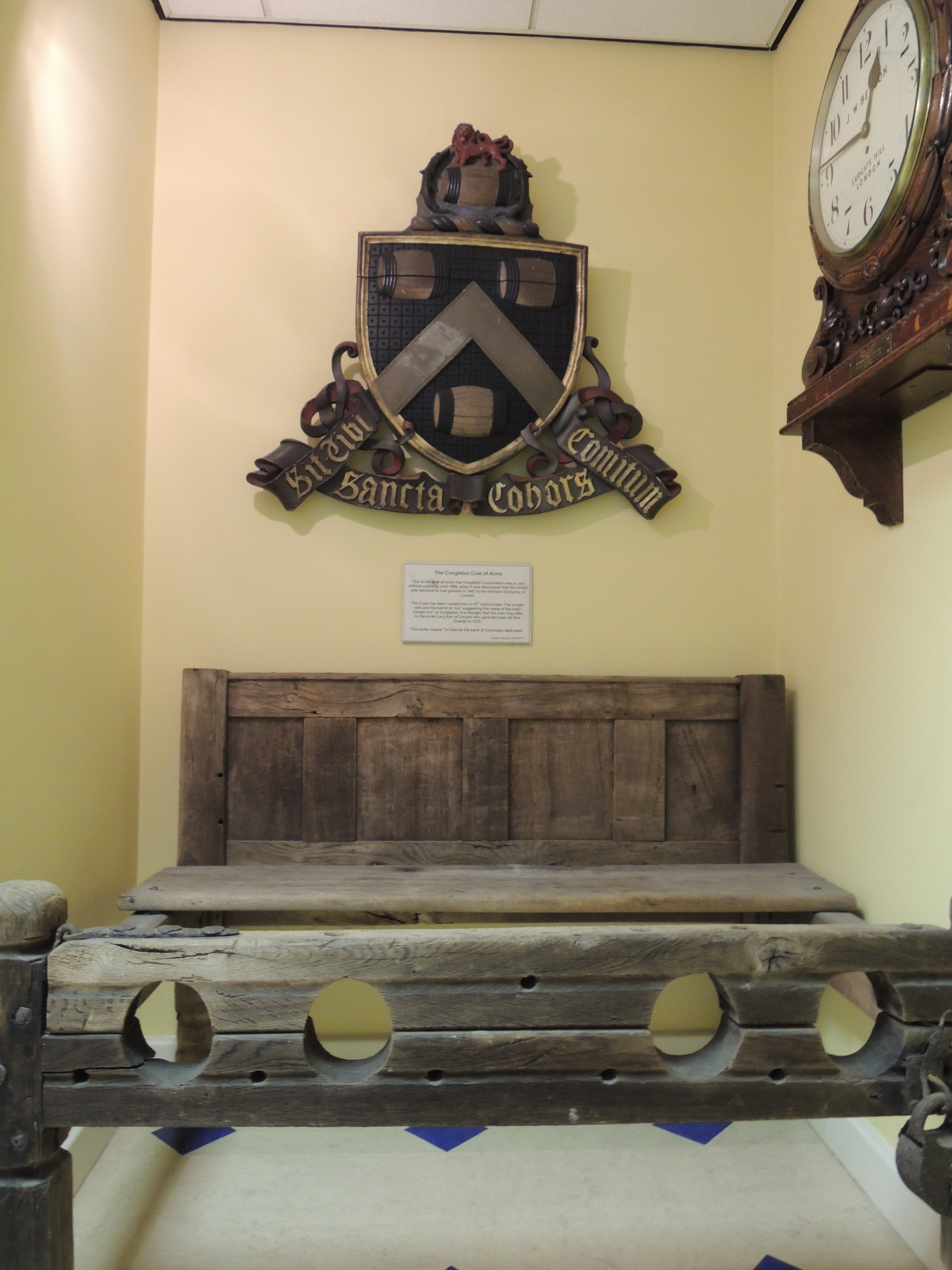
Congleton Stocks

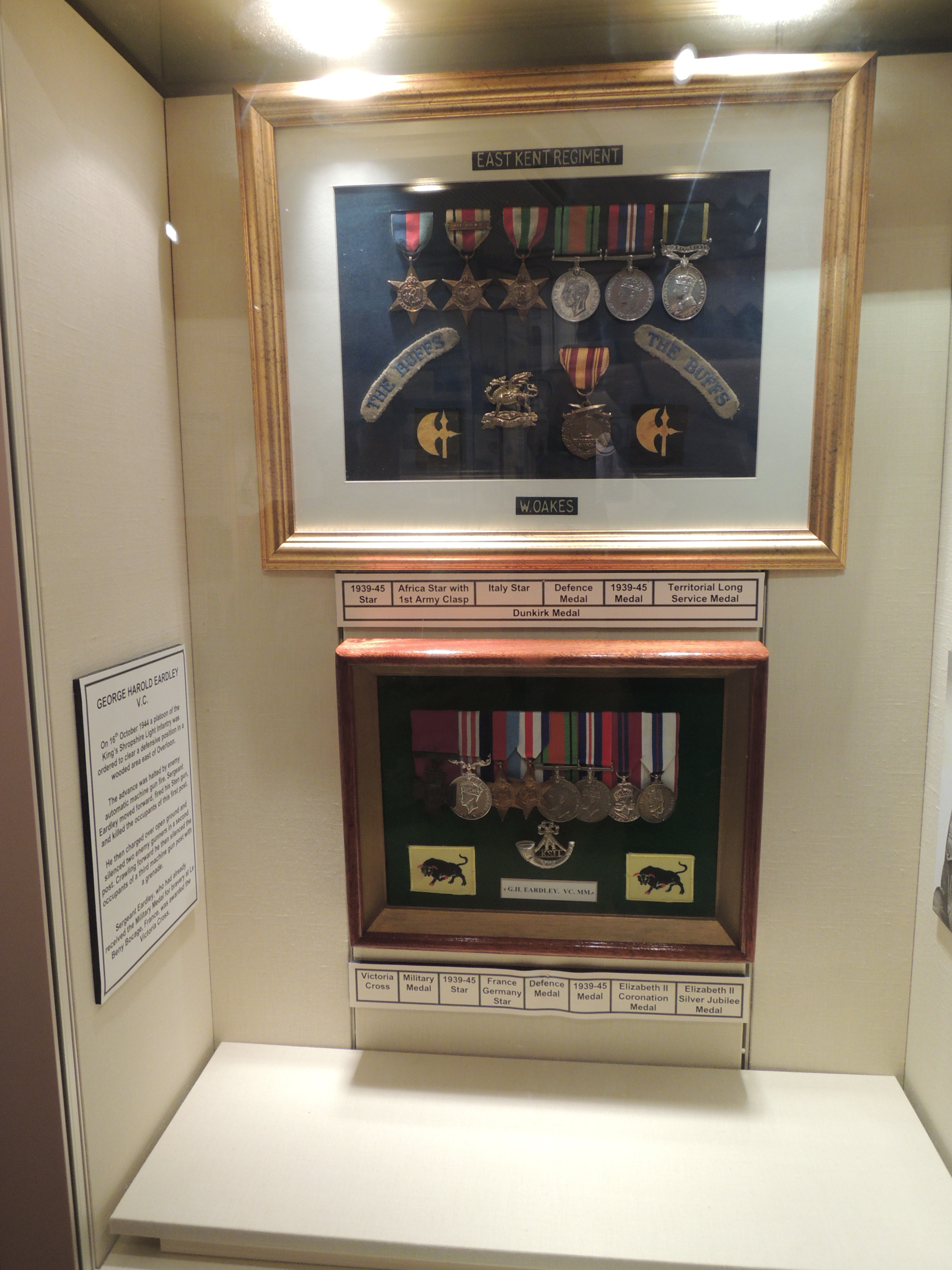
A Selection of War Medals

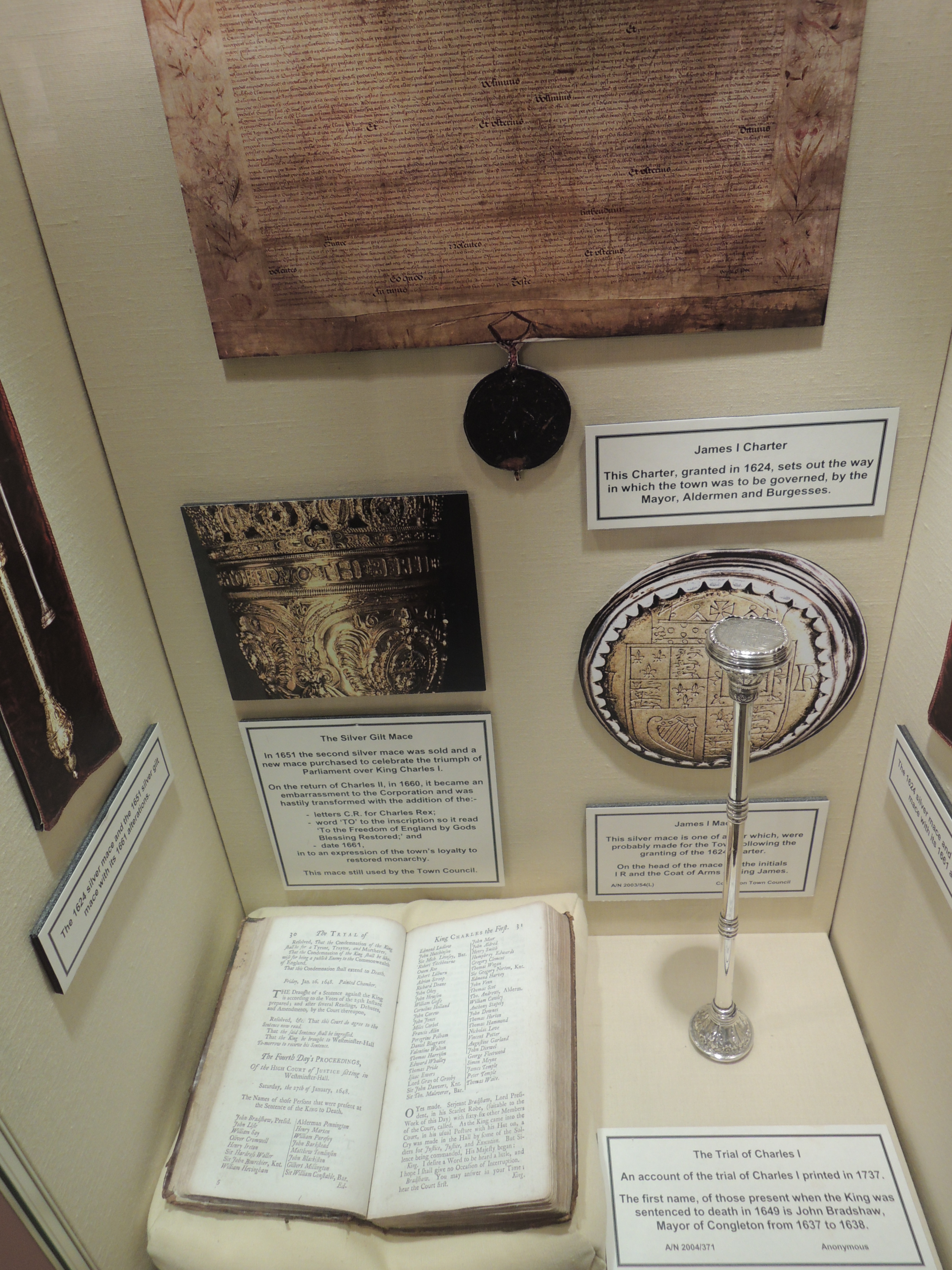
Display case including a copy of a James I Charter

== Access ==
Entry to the museum is free. The museum is fully accessible for people with disabilities, with a wheelchair lift on the stairs, an accessible toilet and a hearing loop available for talks and walks.

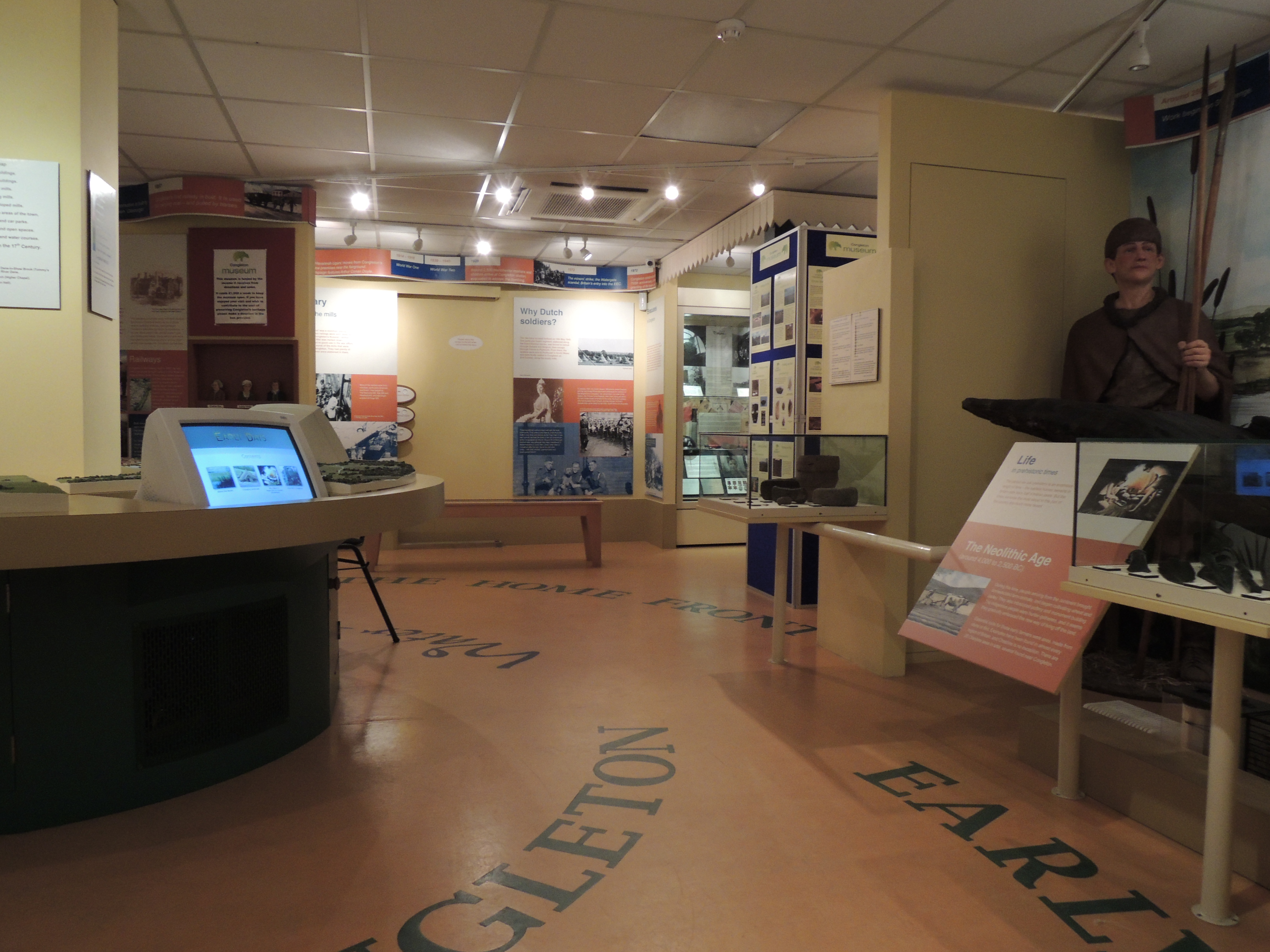
Museum interior

== Education ==
The museum offers a Second World War Evacuee Experience for primary aged children on the theme of the Second World War.

== Events ==
The museum holds local history walks along various themes. Past themes have included: "Surprising trades"; "A pub crawl through Time" and "Mill Walks and Industrial Yarns". Talks are given by guest speakers or the museum's Collection's Manager, Ian Doughty, on topics such as the Staffordshire Hoard and researching local history.

== Research ==
The museum has a local history reference library containing publications associated with Congleton and the surrounding area. The archive collection includes the town charters and account books as well as estate, business and private papers. The museum has an image bank of over 5,000 pictures, which provide a visual history of Congleton.

== See also ==
- List of museums in Cheshire
