= Eaton Bank Academy =

Academy in Congleton, England

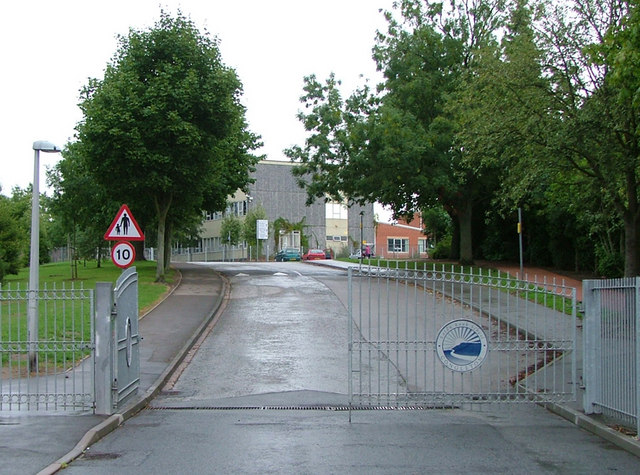
- The school in 2006

Location
- Jackson Road; Congleton, Cheshire, CW12 1NT; England
- 53°10′31″N 2°12′08″W

Information
- Former name: Eaton Bank School
- Type: Academy
- Motto: Believe in Success
- Established: 7 September 2000
- Local authority: Cheshire East Council
- Trust: The Halliard Trust
- Department for Education URN: 138662 Tables
- Ofsted: Reports
- Headteacher: Ed O’Neill
- Gender: Coeducational
- Age: 11 to 18
- Enrolment: 1,069
- Website: eatonbank.ht.school

Eaton Bank Academy (formerly Eaton Bank School) is a co-educational secondary school with academy status located in the town of Congleton in Cheshire, England.

== History ==
The school was formed in 2000 after the reduction of the area's three schools to two larger schools (the previous schools being Dane Valley High School, Heathfield High School and Westlands High School). The school gained academy status in September 2012.

When the school opened it contained several new buildings.

In 2013 Eaton Bank Academy announced plans for a multi-purpose sports centre, the sports centre was planned to cost £3 Million. The plans were announced as part of "Congleton's attempt to secure it's Olympic legacy".

In 2019 ministerial approval was given for Eaton Bank Academy to join Fallibroome Trust.

== Ofsted ==
In an Ofsted inspection in 2015 the report classified the school as 'Good with outstanding features'. The report rated both 'leadership and management' and student 'behaviour and welfare' as Outstanding. The inspectors reported; "There is an exceptional ethos and climate for learning within the school".

== Notable alumni ==
- Keira Barry footballer

== See also ==
- Congleton High School
