= Congleton Carnival =

Former carnival in Cheshire, England

- Status: Defunct
- Genre: Carnival
- Frequency: Bi-annually
- Location: Congleton
- Country: United Kingdom
- Years active: 1920s–1938, 1961–2018
- Inaugurated: 1920s
- Most recent: 2018

The Congleton Carnival (sometimes called the Congleton Carnival and Tattoo) was a biannual event held in Congleton, Cheshire.

== History ==
The first Congleton Carnival was held in the 1920s.

The Congleton Carnival ran until 1938 when it was halted, the event would not be held again until 1961.

The Carnivals held in the 1930s were an annual event, when the Carnival restarted in 1962 it became a biannual 3 day event.

During the Carnival's Heyday the event was held over multiple days and was considered one of the "best of its kind in the country".

In the past the Congleton Carnival was known as the Congleton Carnival and Tattoo and featured military units which included the Red Devils.

A tradition was for the carnival to start with Stephan Sebire riding his penny-farthing down the carnival route.
