= Congleton Park =

Park in Congleton, Cheshire, England

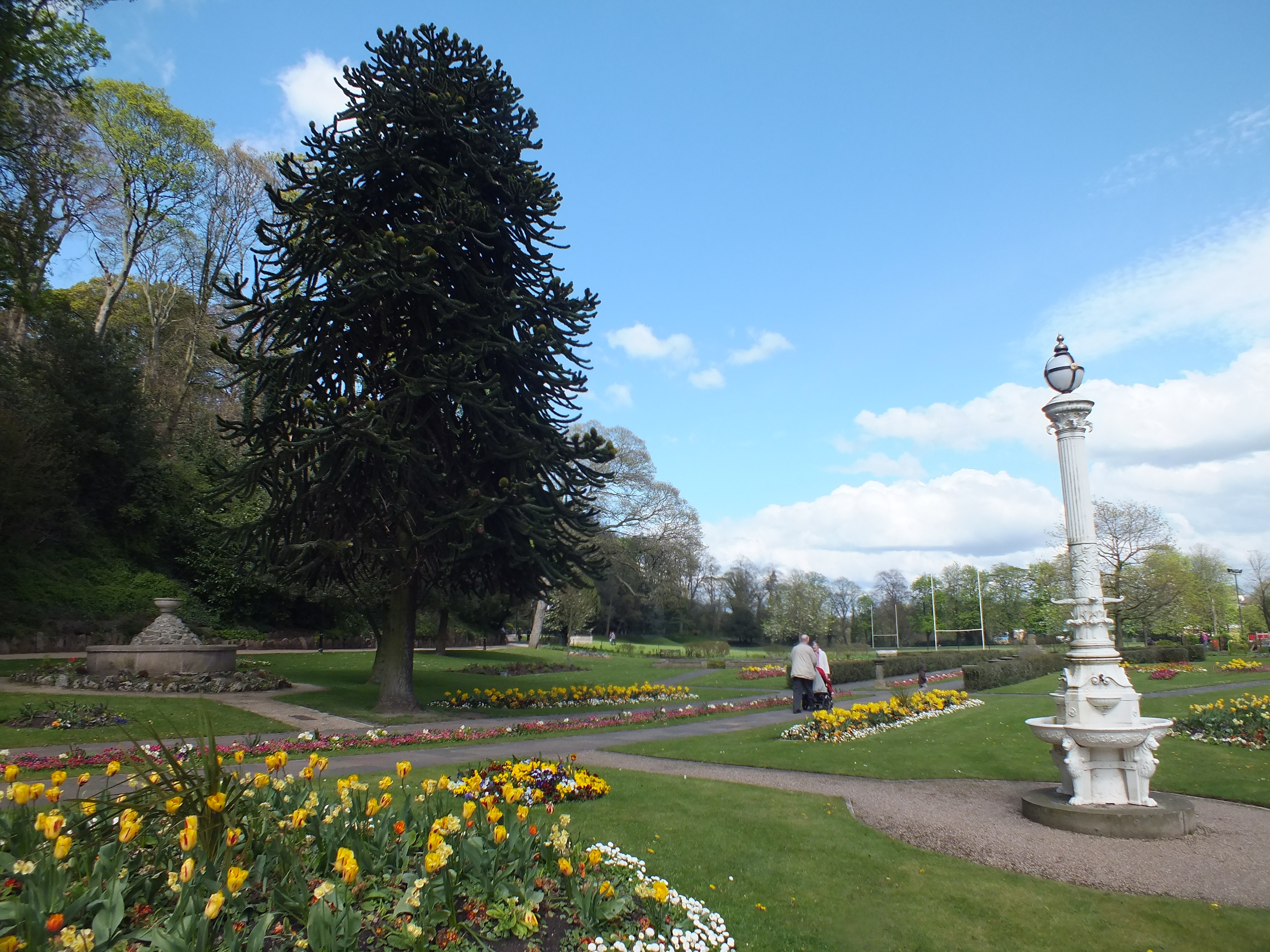
- The formal garden, and the drinking fountain of 1887
- Interactive map of Congleton Park
- Location: Congleton, Cheshire
- OS grid: SJ 86174 63413
- Coordinates: 53°10′03.5″N 2°12′29.8″W
- Area: 10.5 hectares (26 acres)
- Opened: 1871
- Operator: Congleton Town Council
- Designation: Grade II
- Website: www.congletonpark.co.uk

Congleton Park is a public park in Congleton, in Cheshire, England. It is listed Grade II in Historic England's Register of Parks and Gardens, and the park has several times won a Green Flag Award. It is owned by Cheshire East Council and operated by Congleton Town Council.

== Background ==
In 1860, members of the Park Committee, set up to create a park in the town, along with James Bateman, creator of the gardens at Biddulph Grange, assessed a possible location at Town Wood. Congleton Town Council subsequently purchased land between Town Wood and the River Dane. The park was designed by Edward Kemp (who had worked under Joseph Paxton at Chatsworth House) and the town surveyor William Blackshaw. A cast-iron bridge was built over the River Dane, providing a southern entry to the park. Congleton Park was opened on 29 May 1871 by the Mayor, Dr Robert Beales.

== Description ==
The area of the park is about 10.5 hectares (26 acres). In the north-west is Town Wood, a steep wooded slope of area about 4.5 hectares (11 acres) through which are informal paths: there are views from here to the east and south. At the highest point there was once a mock fort emplacement with a Russian cannon. The cannon, one of many captured after the Siege of Sevastopol (1854–1855), was received by Congleton in 1859 and placed in the park in 1871. It was removed in 1940, and was probably melted down for the war effort.

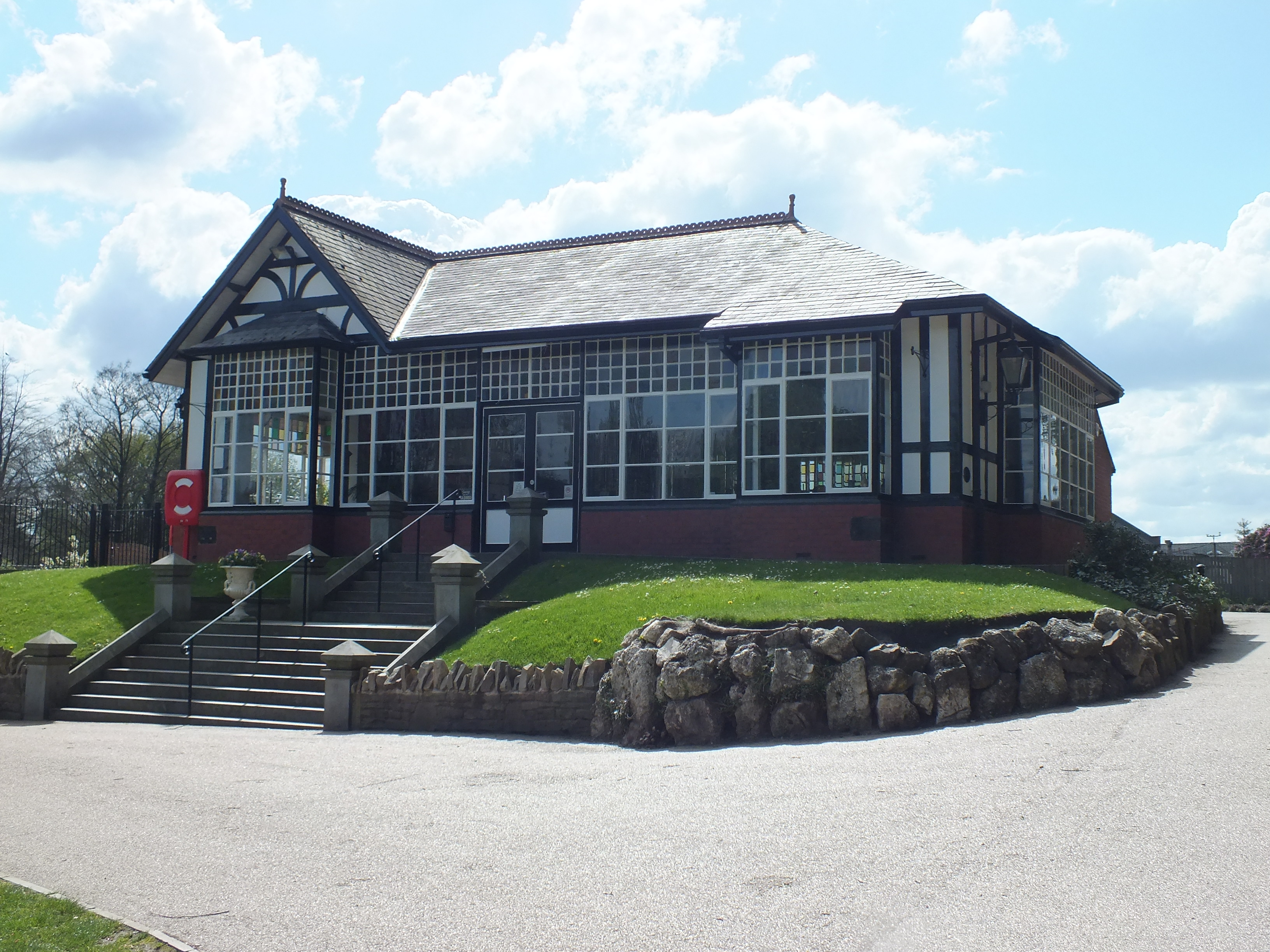
The Jubilee Pavilion

Below Town Wood is a flat triangular area with a circuit path, bounded on two sides by the River Dane. A pavilion was built near the cast-iron bridge in 1887, to mark the Golden Jubilee of Queen Victoria, and a landing stage was built by the river. A cast-iron drinking fountain of 1887, originally in the town centre, was later moved to the park. A bowling pavilion was built in 1897, later replaced. A second bridge across the river was built before 1909, a wooden footbridge near St Stephen's Church, which was replaced in 1976.

The Coronation Garden, east-north-east of the pavilion, is a formal garden created in 1953 to celebrate the Coronation of Elizabeth II. The market cross has stood in its present central position since 1953. It base is thought to date from about 1500. It was removed from its original location in 1772; it was reassembled from surviving parts in 1902, and erected in Lawton Street Gardens, where in 1919 it was used as the town's first war memorial before a permanent memorial was established. It was moved in the 1920s to the north entrance of Congleton Park.

== Facilities ==
Facilities include a bowling green, a large open space, and a children's play area. Public events take place throughout the year.
