= Dane Valley High School =

Former High School in Congleton, England

Location
- Jackson Road; Congleton, Cheshire, CW12 1NT; England; 53°10′31″N 2°12′08″W

Information
- Former name: Dane Valley County High School
- Type: Secondary School
- Opened: 1965
- Closed: 31 August 2000
- Local authority: Cheshire County Council
- Department for Education URN: 111408 Tables
- Ofsted: Reports
- Gender: Coeducational
- Age: 11 to 18
- Enrolment: 489 (In 1999)

Dane Valley High School was a co-educational secondary school located in the town of Congleton in Cheshire, England.

== History ==
Dane Valley High School opened in 1965 as "Dane Valley County High School" and was a girls secondary school until 1979 when the school became coeducational.

In 1983 a group of pupils went to study at the Herndon International School in the United States of America, the trip was organised following an earlier trip to the United States of America by Dane Valley High School Head Teacher Nigel Briers.

In 1985 Dane Valley High School was extended and refurbished, the extension and refurbishment of the school cost £300,000.

On 13 June 1998 pupil Claire Heart was murdered, in 1999 Craig Smith was found guilty of her murder and was sentenced to life in prison.

The school closed on 31 August 2000 and was replaced by Eaton Bank School on 7 September 2000.
