= Congleton Town Hall =

Municipal building in Congleton, Cheshire, England

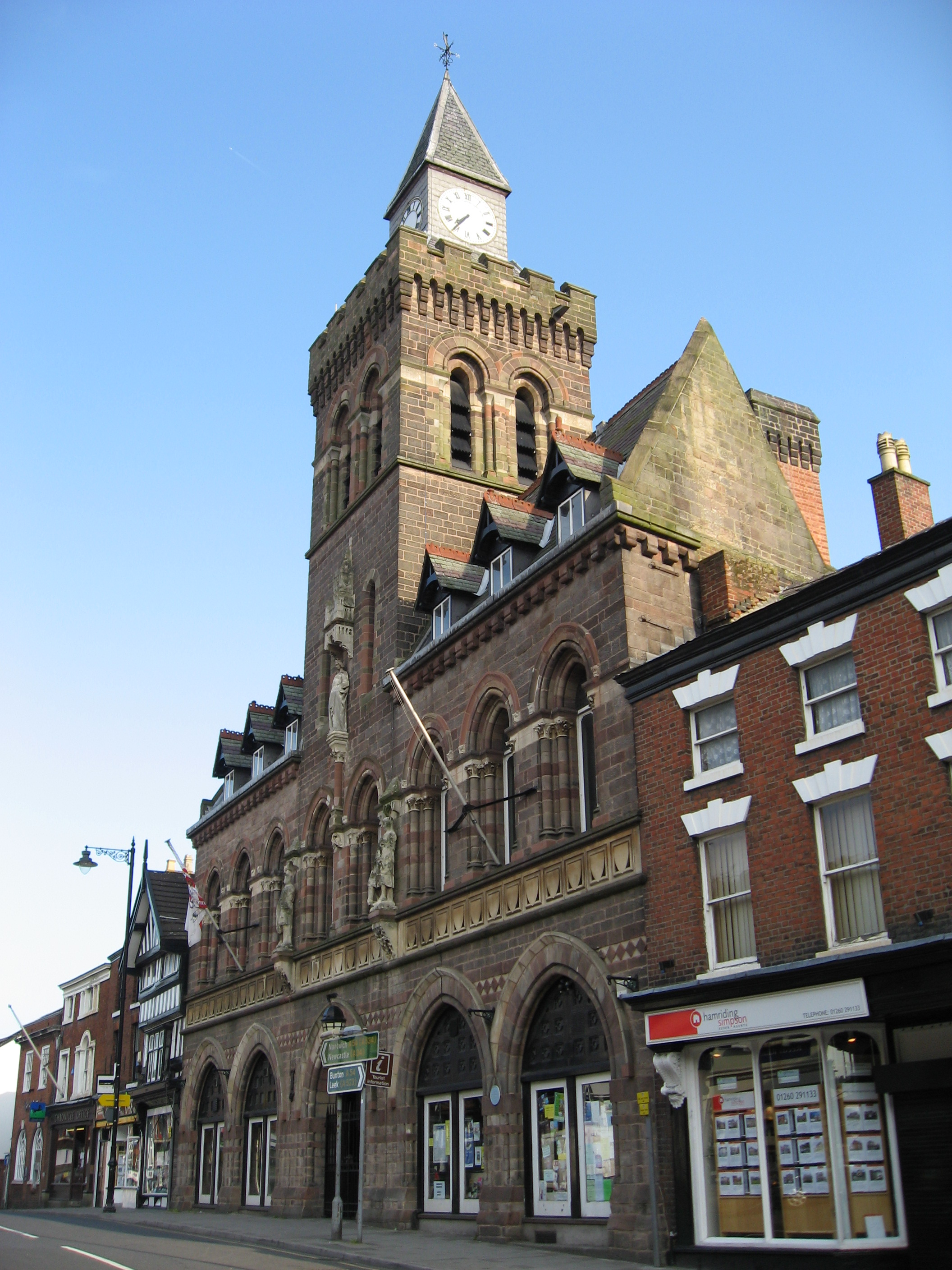
- Congleton Town Hall

- Shown in Cheshire
- 53.1630°N 2.2108°W
- Location: High Street, Congleton

History
- Built: 1866

Site notes
- Architect: Edward William Godwin
- Architectural style: Gothic style

Listed Building – Grade II*
- Official name: Town Hall
- Designated: 13 August 1969
- Reference no.: 1086996

Congleton Town Hall is a municipal building in the High Street, Congleton, Cheshire, England. The town hall, which is the meeting place of Congleton Town Council, is a grade II* listed building.

== History ==
The first town hall on the site was a half-timbered, black and white structure referred to as the "moot hall": it included a lock-up and a courtroom and was completed in the late 15th century. This structure was replaced by a second building on the same site referred to as the "guildhall"; it was designed in the neoclassical style with a colonnade, a lock-up and a courtroom and was completed in 1804. It was expanded, as a gift from Sir Edmund Antrobus, 1st Baronet, to create a market hall and an assembly room in 1823.

After the second town hall became inadequate, civic leaders decided to procure a third town hall on the site. The third building was the subject of a design competition which was assessed by Alfred Waterhouse and won by Edward William Godwin. Construction started in 1864. It was designed in the Gothic style, built by a Mr Burkitt of Wolverhampton at a cost of £8,000, and was officially opened on 11 July 1866. The design involved a symmetrical main frontage with seven bays facing onto the High Street; the central bay featured an arched doorway on the ground floor with a two-stage 110 feet (34 m) high clock tower with a pyramid-shaped roof above. The clock by J. W. Benson Ltd, struck the hours and the quarters on two bells. There was a row of thirty-three shields and eight round headed windows flanked by colonettes forming an arcade on the first floor and there were dormer windows on either side of the clock tower at attic level. The front elevation also featured a statue of Henry de Lacy, Earl of Lincoln (on the right), who granted the town a charter in 1272, and of King Edward I (on the left), who granted the town the right to hold markets in 1274, and a statue of Queen Victoria (on the clock tower). Internally, the principal rooms were a double-height main hall with a hammerbeam roof, a courtroom and a library.

The town hall continued to serve as the headquarters of Congleton Municipal Borough Council but ceased to be the local seat of government after the enlarged Congleton Borough Council, which had been formed in 1974, relocated to Westfields in Sandbach. An extensive programme of refurbishment works costing £975,000 was completed at the town hall in 1996. Congleton Town Council, which was created in 1980, established offices in the building in January 2007 and acquired its freehold in June 2008.

The Prince of Wales and the Duchess of Cornwall visited the town hall and met with local charities and community groups on 24 January 2018. Works of art in the town hall include a silver gilt ceremonial mace which originally bore the words "The Freedome of England by God's Blessing Restored" and the date of manufacture which was 1651 but, after the restoration of the monarchy, it was altered to show the initials "C. R." (Charles Rex) and given an amended date of 1661.

== See also ==
- Listed buildings in Congleton
- Grade II* listed buildings in Cheshire East
