= Congleton =

Town in Cheshire, England

Coordinates: 53°09′47″N 2°12′38″W

- Town
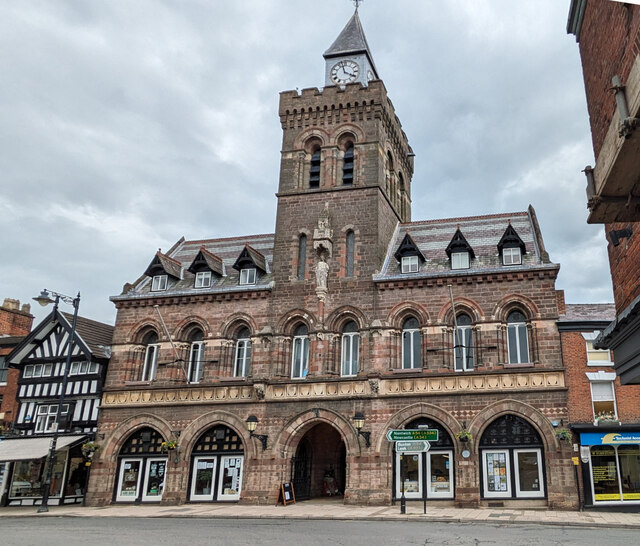
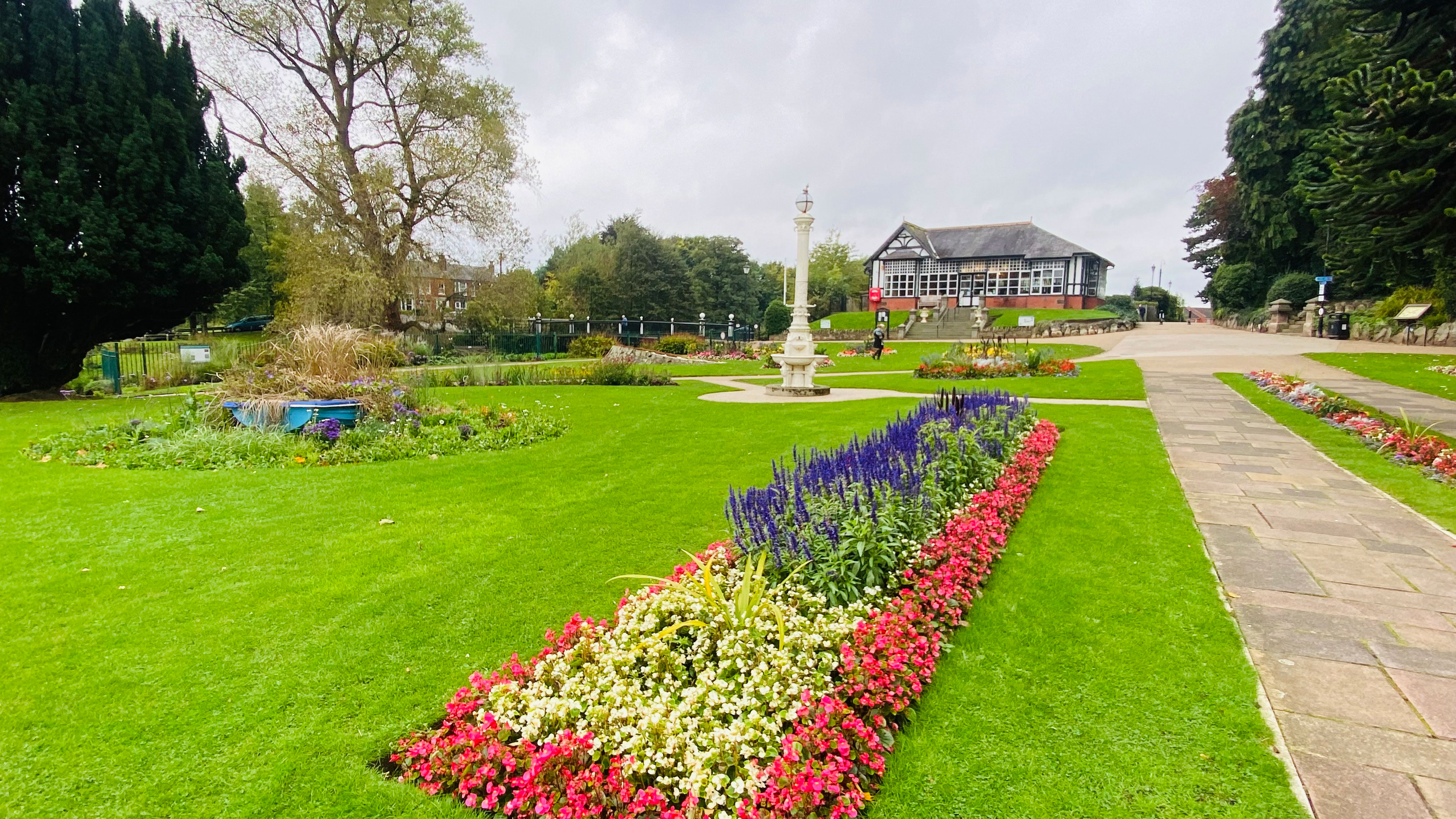
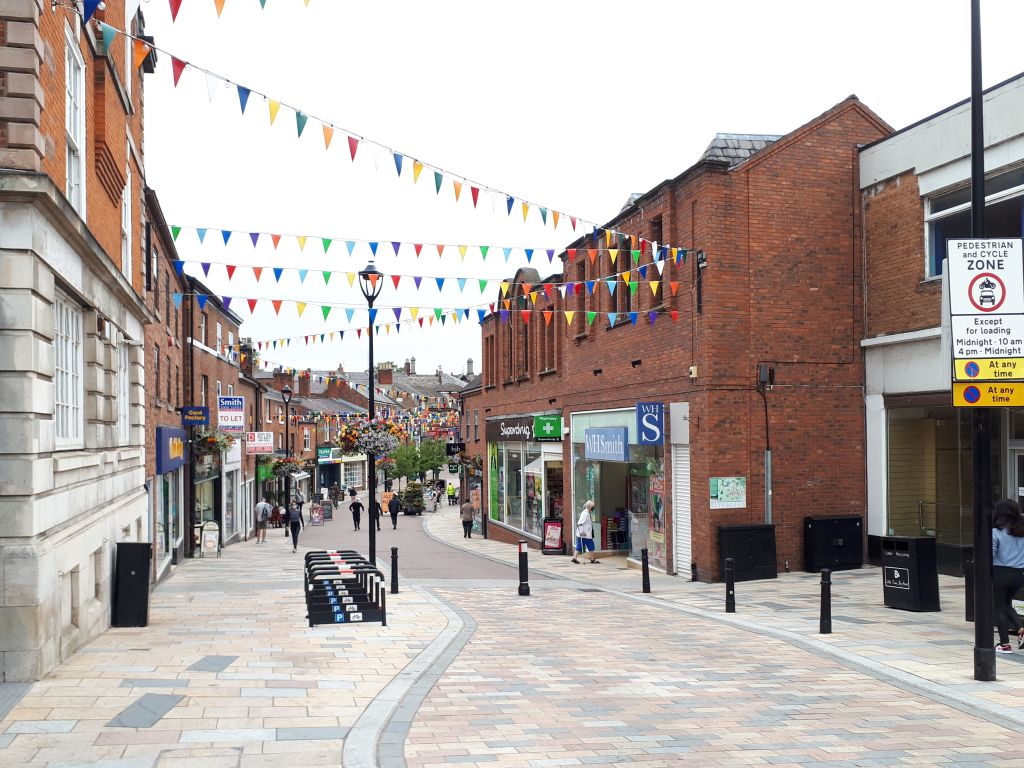
- Town Hall Congleton Park Bridge Street

- Location within Cheshire
- Population: 28,497 (Parish, 2021); 30,005 (Built up area, 2021)
- OS grid reference: SJ854628
- Civil parish: Congleton
- Unitary authority: Cheshire East
- Ceremonial county: Cheshire
- Region: North West
- Country: England
- Sovereign state: United Kingdom
- Post town: CONGLETON
- Postcode district: CW12
- Dialling code: 01260
- Police: Cheshire
- Fire: Cheshire
- Ambulance: North West
- UK Parliament: Congleton
- Website: www.congleton-tc.gov.uk

Congleton is a market town and civil parish in the borough of Cheshire East, in Cheshire, England. The town is on the River Dane, 21 miles (34 km) south of Manchester and 13 miles (21 km) north of Stoke on Trent. At the 2021 census, the town's built-up area had a population of 30,005, while the parish had a population of 28,497.

== Toponymy ==
The town's name is of unknown origin. The first recorded reference to it was in 1282, when it was spelt Congelton. The element Congle might relate to the old Norse kang meaning a bend, followed by the Old English element tun meaning settlement.

== History ==
The first settlements in the Congleton area were Neolithic. Stone Age and Bronze Age artefacts have been found in the town. Congleton was once thought to have been a Roman settlement, although there is no archaeological or documentary evidence to support this. Congleton became a market town after Vikings destroyed nearby Davenport.

Godwin, Earl of Wessex held the town in the Saxon period. The town is mentioned in the Domesday Book of 1086, where it is listed as Cogeltone: Bigot de Loges. William the Conqueror granted the whole of Cheshire to his nephew the Earl of Chester who constructed several fortifications including the town's castle in 1208. In the 13th century, Congleton belonged to the de Lacy family. Henry de Lacy, 3rd Earl of Lincoln granted the Corporation of Congleton its first charter in 1272, enabling it to hold fairs and markets, elect a mayor and ale taster, have a merchant guild and behead known criminals.

In 1451, the River Dane flooded, destroying a number of buildings, the town's mill and a wooden bridge. The river was diverted, and the town was rebuilt on higher ground.

Congleton became known for bear-baiting and cockfighting in the 1620s, when they were popular sports. The town was unable to attract large crowds to its bear-baiting contests and lacked the money to pay for a new, more aggressive bear. A legend tells that Congleton spent the money they were going to spend on a Bible on a bear; this legend is only partly true as only part of the fund to buy a new Bible was used to buy a new bear. The legend earned Congleton the nickname Beartown. The chorus of 20th-century folk song "Congleton Bear", by folk artist John Tams, runs:

Congleton Rare, Congleton Rare
Sold the Bible to buy a bear.

During the Civil War, former mayor and lawyer John Bradshaw became president of the court which sent Charles I to his execution in 1649. His signature as Attorney General was the first on the king's death warrant. A plaque on Bradshaw House in Lawton Street commemorates him. Almost opposite the town hall, the White Lion public house bears a blue plaque, placed by the Congleton Civic Society, which reads: "The White Lion, built 16–17th century. Said to have housed the attorney's office where John Bradshaw, regicide, served his articles."

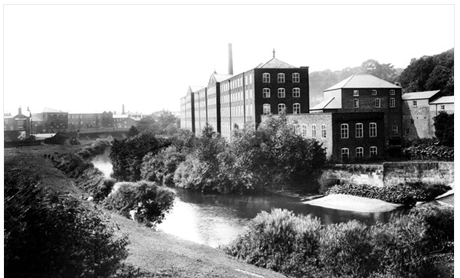
The Old Mill and the town corn mill photographed in 1902; the mill became unstable and Roldane Mill was built on the site in 1923. The mill was demolished in 2003, and sheltered housing is being built here.

King Edward I granted permission to build a mill. Congleton became an important centre of textile production, especially leather gloves and lace. Congleton had an early silk throwing mill, the Old Mill built by John Clayton and Nathaniel Pattison in 1753. More mills followed and cotton was also spun. The town's prosperity depended on tariffs imposed on imported silk. When tariffs were removed in the 1860s, the empty mills were converted to fustian cutting. A limited silk ribbon weaving industry survived into the 20th century, and woven labels were still produced in the 1990s. Many mills survive as industrial or residential units.

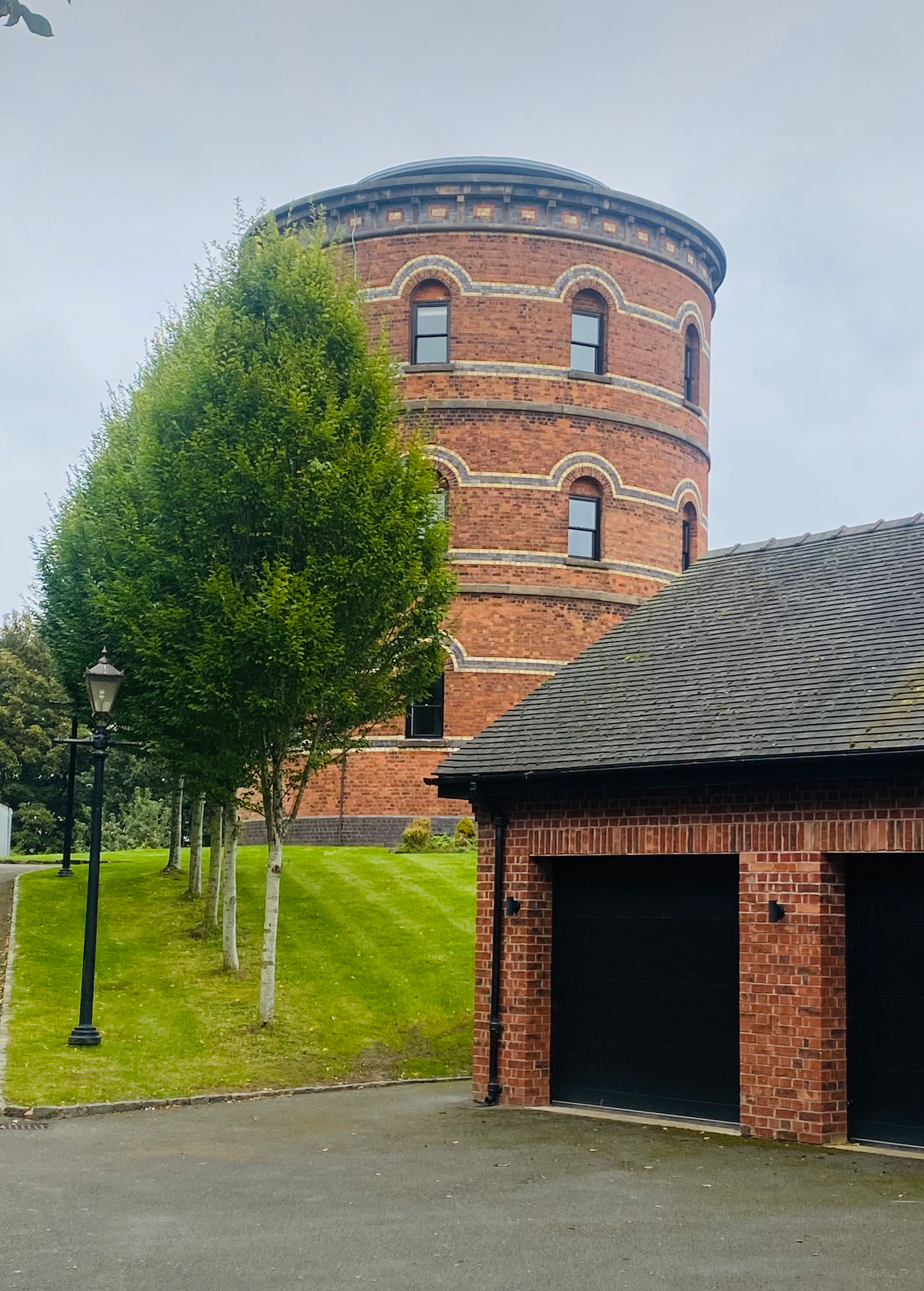
Congleton water tower built 1881

In 1881, in order to improve the water supply to the town, a pumping station was built on Forge Lane to draw water from the springs in Forge Wood and pump it up to a water tower at the top of the hill. The red and yellow brick water tower was designed by the engineer William Blackshaw. A second adjacent tower was constructed later.

Congleton Town Hall was designed in the Gothic style by Edward William Godwin. It was completed in 1866.

The current hospital in Congleton was opened by the Duke of York on 22 May 1924.

In 1920, the Marie Hall home for boys was established in West House, an 18th-century house on West Road, as a branch of the National Children’s Home. It became an approved school in 1935 and was renamed Danesford School. It was converted into a Community Home with Education in 1973, run jointly by NCH and Cheshire County Council. Danesford has since closed, and the Grade II listed buildings have been converted for residential use.

Congleton elected its first Lady Mayor in November 1945.

During the celebration marking 700 years of Congleton's charter in 1972 Queen Elizabeth II and Prince Philip visited Congleton in May, this was the first visit by a reigning monarch since the visit of King George V and Queen Mary in 1913.

In 1983, Princess Michael of Kent visited Congleton.

Between 2008 and 2010 Congleton broke 3 world records.

During the celebration marking 700 years of Mayoralty in Congleton in 2018 the Prince of Wales and the Duchess of Cornwall visited the town.

In 2019 the serial rapist Joseph Mccann was arrested on a country lane in Congleton after a nationwide manhunt for him.

In 2022 a celebration marked the 750th anniversary of Congleton's first charter. An ale taster was appointed as part of the celebrations.

In 2023 part of the Congleton town centre was regenerated as part of the Congleton Market Quarter project. The regenerated part of Congleton town centre is named the "Congleton Market Quarter" and opened in November 2023. Another phase of expansion for the "Congleton Market Quarter" was announced in December 2024, and was due for completion in March 2025.

On 28 September 2024 Congleton appointed its first female town crier.

== Governance ==
There are two tiers of local government covering Congleton, at civil parish (town) and unitary authority level: Congleton Town Council and Cheshire East Council. The town council is based at Congleton Town Hall on High Street.

The Congleton parliamentary constituency is a county constituency represented in the House of Commons of the Parliament of the United Kingdom. It includes the towns of Congleton, Alsager, Holmes Chapel and Sandbach. It elects one Member of Parliament (MP) by the first-past-the-post system of election. The current MP is Sarah Russell of the Labour Party, the previous incumbent was Fiona Bruce of the Conservative Party.

=== Administrative history ===
Congleton was historically one of twelve townships within the ancient parish of Astbury, and formed part of the Northwich hundred of Cheshire. From the 17th century onwards, parishes were gradually given various civil functions under the poor laws, in addition to their original ecclesiastical functions. In some cases, including Astbury, the civil functions were exercised by each township separately rather than the parish as a whole. In 1866, the legal definition of 'parish' was changed to be the areas used for administering the poor laws, and so Congleton became a civil parish.

The Congleton township was granted a municipal charter making it a borough by Henry de Lacy, 3rd Earl of Lincoln. The charter itself is not dated, but is generally assumed to have been issued in 1272, the same year that Lacy became Earl of Lincoln. The borough was reformed to become a municipal borough in 1836 under the Municipal Corporations Act 1835, which standardised how most boroughs operated across the country. In 1837, the government's boundary commissioners recommended that Buglawton should be brought within the borough boundaries, but their recommendations were not implemented. Buglawton was eventually absorbed into the borough in 1936.

The municipal borough of Congleton was abolished in 1974. Its area became part of a larger Congleton borough which also covered nearby towns and surrounding rural areas. No successor parish was created for the area of the old municipal borough at the time of the 1974 reforms, but a new parish of Congleton was subsequently created in 1980, with its parish council taking the name Congleton Town Council.

In 2009, Cheshire East Council was created, taking over the functions of the borough council and Cheshire County Council, which were both abolished.

== Geography ==
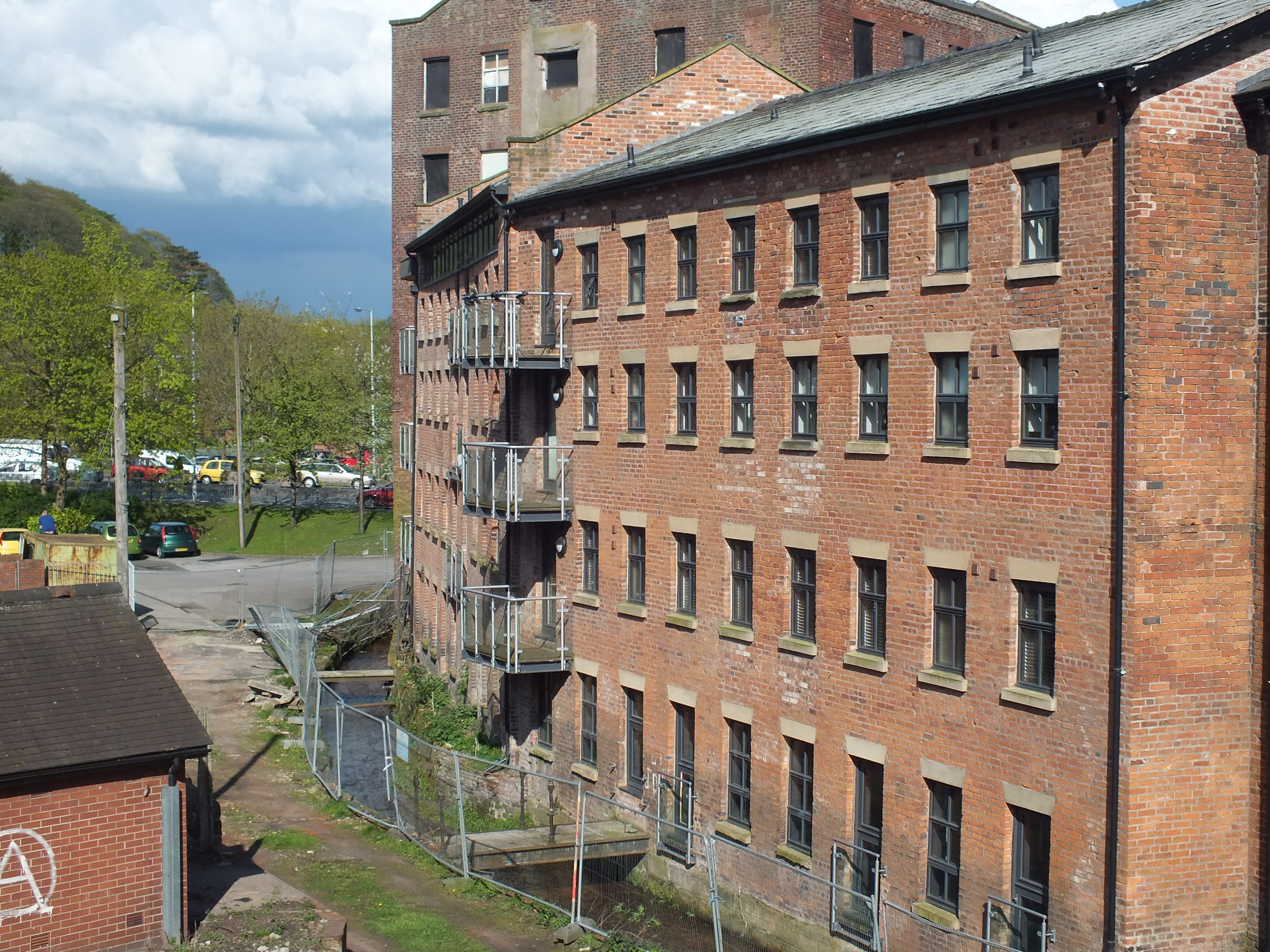
Brook Mill, a textile mill that has been converted to residential units, on a brook leading to the River Dane in the centre of Congleton. Behind are trees on the steep northern bank

Congleton is in the valley of the River Dane. South of the town lies an expanse of green space known locally as Priesty Fields which forms a green corridor into the heart of the town. Folklore says that Priesty Fields gained its name as there was no priest performing services within the town. The nearest priest was based at the nearby village of Astbury. It is told that the priest would walk along an ancient medieval pathway which ran between the fields at the Parish Church in Astbury and St Peter's Church in Congleton.

== Economy ==
The principal industries in Congleton include the manufacture of golf balls. There are light engineering factories near the town and sand extraction occurs on the Cheshire Plain.

One of the most prominent industries during the nineteenth century onwards was Berisfords Ribbons, established in 1858. It was founded by Charles Berisford and his brothers Francis and William. The brothers leased part of Victoria Mill, on Foundry Bank, owning the entire factory by 1872. By 1898, the company had offices in London, Manchester, Leeds and Bristol.

Congleton Market operates every Tuesday and Saturday from the Bridestones Centre.

Until about 2000, Super Crystalate balls, made of crystalate, were manufactured by The Composition Billiard Ball Company in Congleton. The company was then sold by its owner to Saluc S.A., the Belgian manufacturer of Aramith Balls. The name Super Crystalate was retained, but the manufacturing process was integrated into the standard process used for Aramith balls.

== Culture ==
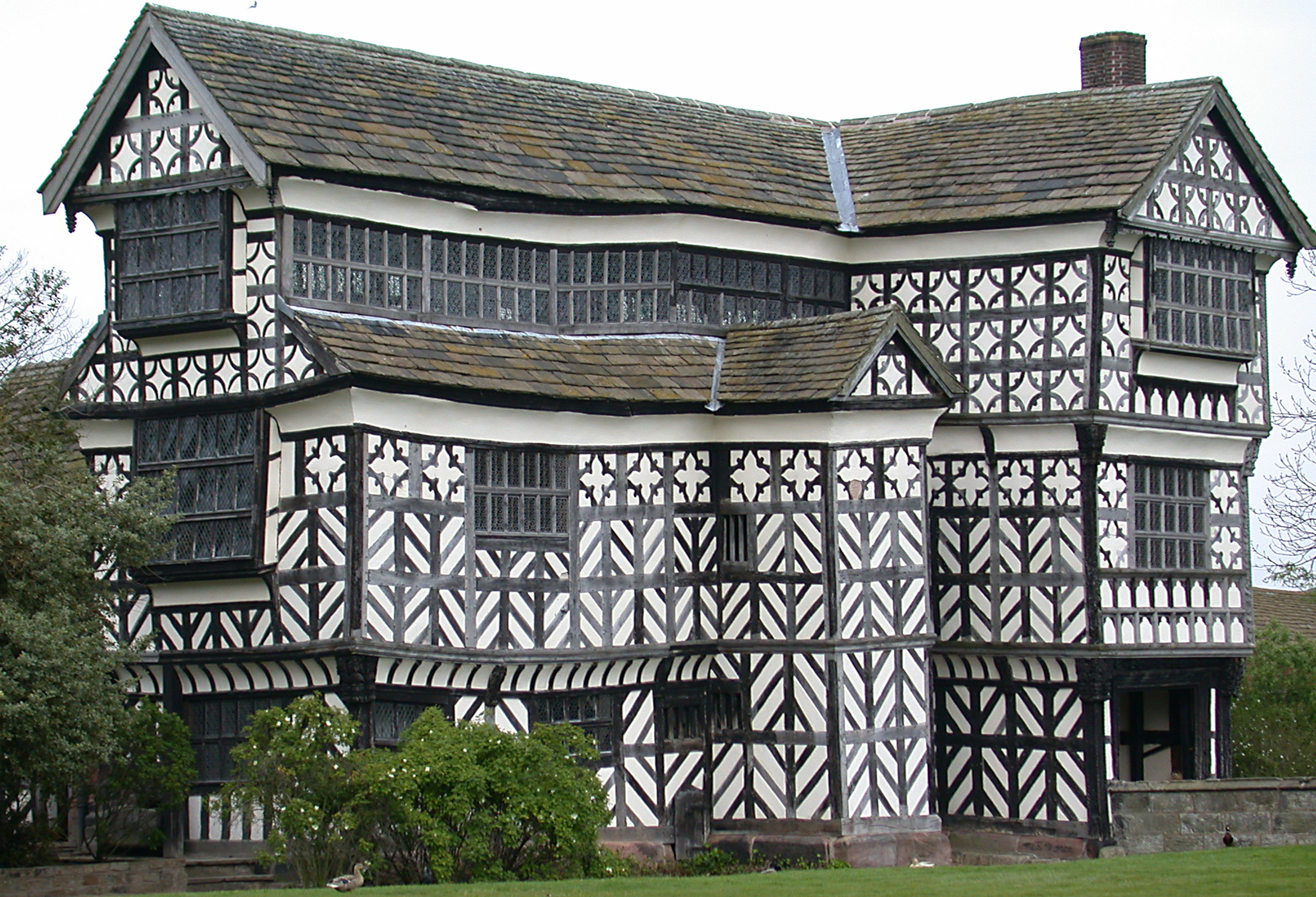
Little Moreton Hall, 4 miles (6.4 km) south-west of Congleton

The National Trust Tudor house Little Moreton Hall is 4 miles (6.4 km) south-west of the town.

Congleton Park is located along the banks of the River Dane, just north-east of the town centre. Town Wood, on the northern edge of the park, is a Grade A Site of Biological Interest and contains many nationally important plants. Congleton Paddling Pool was built in the 1930s and is open in the summer months. Astbury Mere Country Park lies just to the south-west of the town centre, on the site of a former sand quarry. The lake is used for fishing and sailing and, despite its name, is in the West Heath area of Congleton, with the boundary between Congleton and Newbold Astbury parishes lying further to the south.

The independently run 300 seat Daneside Theatre is on Park Road. The 400-seat Clonter Opera Theatre is based in the village of Swettenham Heath, 5 mi (8 km) north of Congleton. Founded in 1971, Congleton Choral Society is a mixed voice choir which regularly performs choral works at Congleton Town Hall and other venues around the town.

Congleton Museum is on Market Square, in the centre of town. It was established in 2002 and is dedicated to Congleton's industrial history. It also contains an ancient log boat and gold and silver coin hoards. Congleton Tourist Information Centre is on the town's High Street.

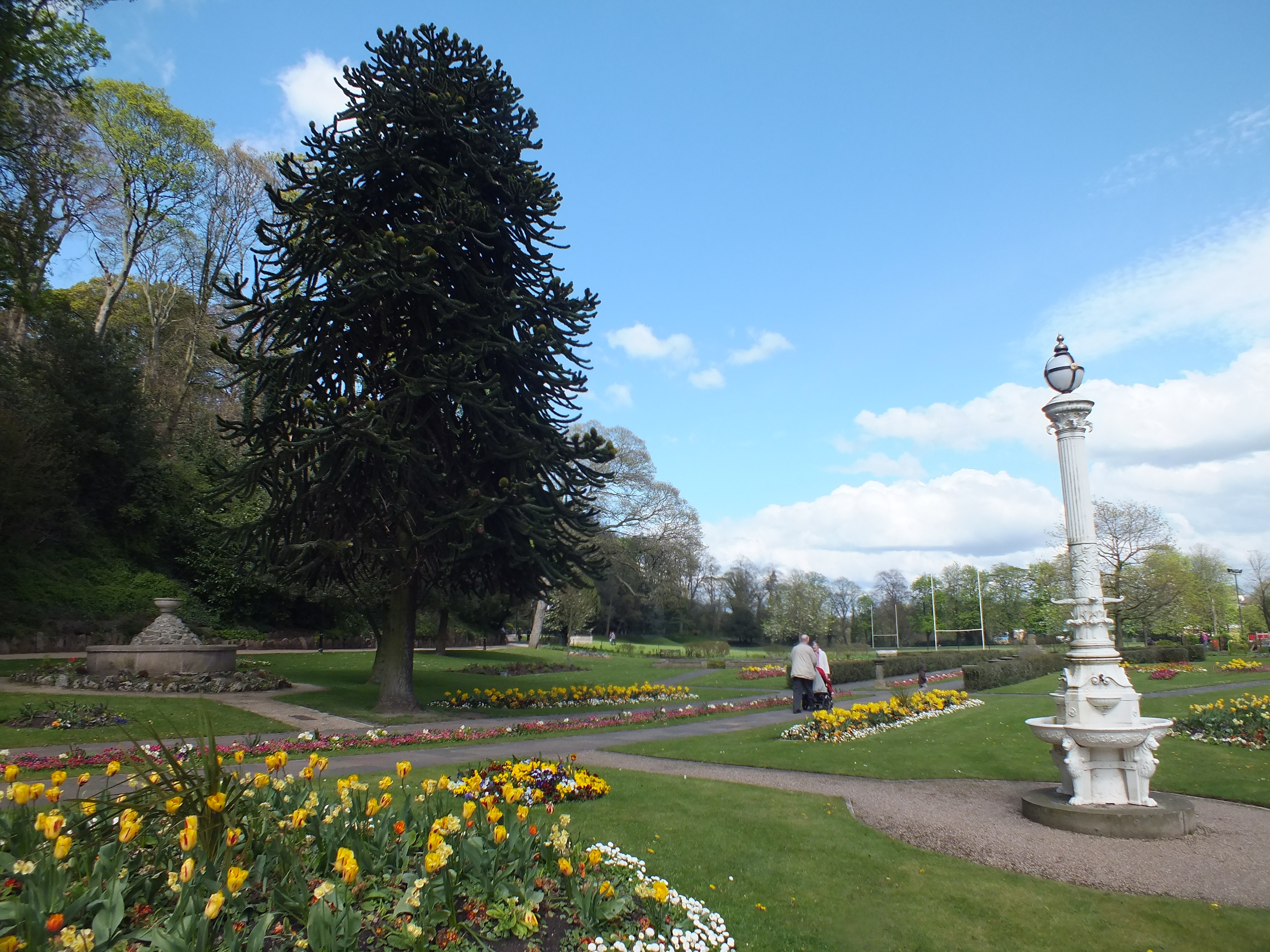
Congleton Park from the Jubilee Pavilion

The town annually hosts a food and drink festival, which promotes locally sourced produce/cuisine, with a jazz and blues festival which showcases acts from across the UK. In 2019, Congleton held its first annual pride event.

Congleton hosts two annual musical festivals, Congleton Jazz and Blues and Congleton Unplugged.

Congleton hosts an annual environment event knows as a Green Fair.

The town once hosted the Congleton Carnival a one-day carnival which was hosted once every two years. In the past, the carnival was regarded as one of the best local carnivals in England and used to last for up to three days and feature floats and live music among another attractions.

A yearly garden party was once hosted at Mossley House, which was demolished in the early 2010s.

For six months in summer 2011 Congleton hosted an event called "Bearmania", in which over sixty 5-foot fibreglass sculptures where placed around the town. Over 26,000 people came to see the bears during "Bearmania".

=== Media ===
There is one weekly local newspaper: the locally owned and financed Congleton Chronicle. The evening newspaper The Sentinel, based in Stoke-on-Trent, also covers the town although less so than in the past. Local radio is broadcast from nearby Macclesfield-based Silk Radio, Hits Radio Staffordshire & Cheshire and Greatest Hits Radio Staffordshire & Cheshire from Stoke-on-Trent and BBC Radio Stoke. Community radio is provided by Moorlands Radio in Leek and Canalside Community Radio in Bollington.

Local news and television programmes are provided by BBC North West and ITV Granada. Television signals are received from the Winter Hill and the local relay transmitters.

Congleton did have its own community radio station Beartown FM, but this has now closed. There is an internet-only radio station, Congleton Radio, which started broadcasting on 25 June 2022.

== Sport ==
=== Rugby union ===
Congleton is home to the third oldest rugby union club in the country, dating back to 1860. Currently fielding a mini and junior section and three adult sides, the club held the world record for the longest continuous game of rugby ever played, at 24 hours, 30 minutes and 6 seconds. The club has also pioneered the development of 'walking rugby' for more senior players and has re-established a ladies' team, having previously had two of its women players represent England.

=== Football ===
The local football team, Congleton Town F.C., known as the Bears, play in the Northern Premier League First Division West. Their ground is at Booth Street.

=== Tennis ===
Congleton Tennis Club, one of the oldest in the country (founded in 1890), have occupied the same grounds throughout their history. The club has nine courts: six all-weather courts and three with artificial grass. Four of the courts are floodlit.

=== Basketball ===
Congleton Grizzlies Basketball Club is the town's basketball team.

=== Other sports ===
There are two cricket clubs, Congleton CC and Mossley CC. There are two golf clubs in the town—the nine-hole Congleton Golf Club, and the 18-hole parkland course at Astbury. Congleton Harriers running club meets weekly at Congleton Leisure Centre. The club organises the Congleton Half Marathon. A weekly 5K parkrun takes place at Astbury Mere Country Park.

== Transport ==
=== Railway ===
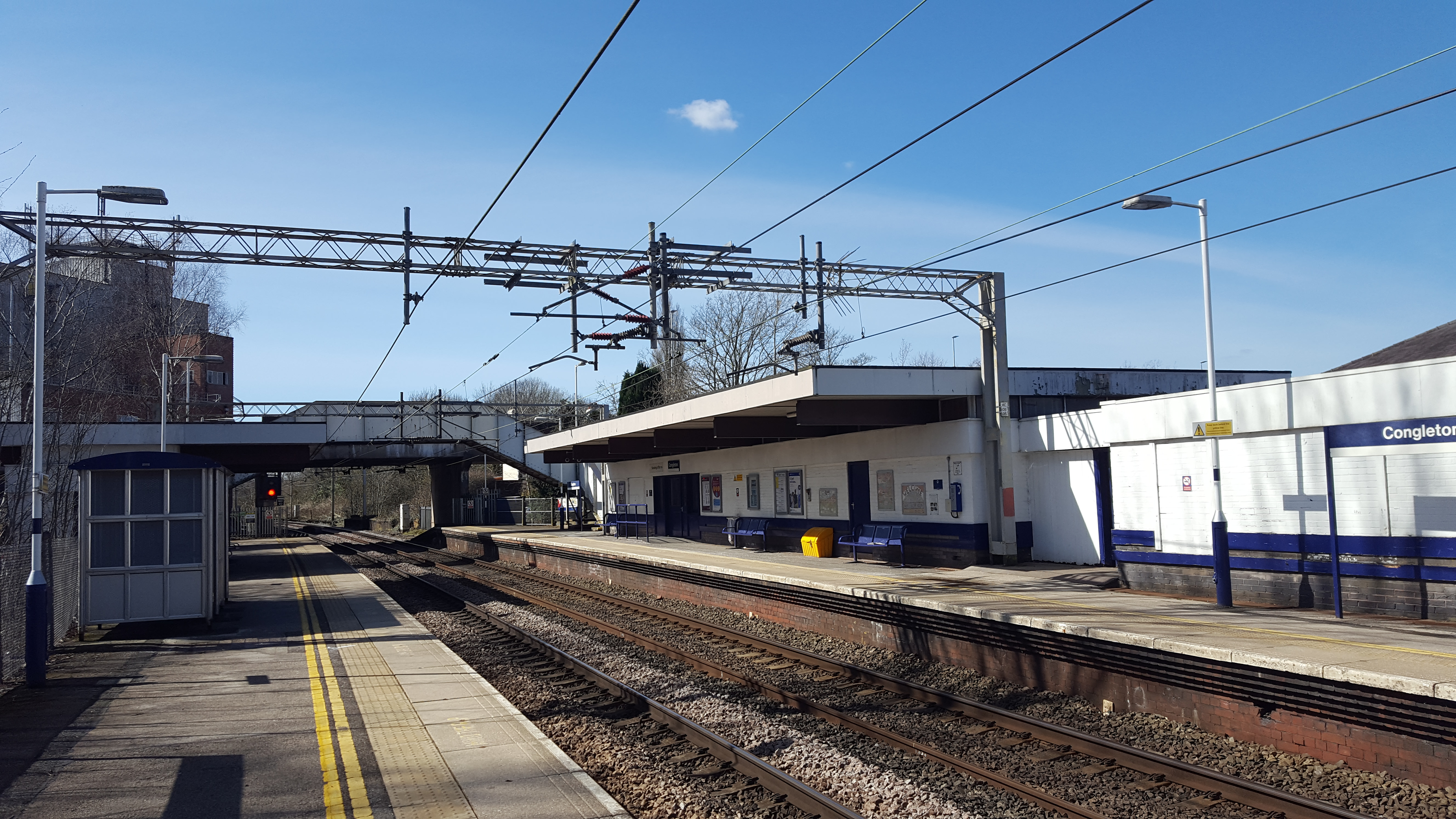
Congleton railway station in 2018

Congleton railway station was opened by the North Staffordshire Railway on 9 October 1848. It is situated on the Stafford-Manchester spur of the West Coast Main Line. There is generally an hourly stopping service between Manchester Piccadilly and Stoke-on-Trent, and on Sundays (every 2 to 3 hours), with trains operated by Northern Trains.

The Biddulph Valley line used to terminate in the town. The railway ran from Stoke-on-Trent to Brunswick Wharf, in the suburb of Buglawton. Passenger services ended in 1927, with freight services continuing until 1968, when the line was closed.

=== Buses ===
Congleton is served by eight bus routes, operated by D&G Bus. Destinations include Alsager, Macclesfield, Crewe and Newcastle.

=== Roads ===
Congleton is 7 miles (11 km) east of the M6 motorway, connected by the A534. It is on the A34 trunk road between Stoke-on-Trent and Manchester, and the A54 to Buxton and the Peak District. The A536 links the town with Macclesfield, with the A527 linking the town to Biddulph and providing an alternative route to Stoke-on-Trent.

=== Waterways ===
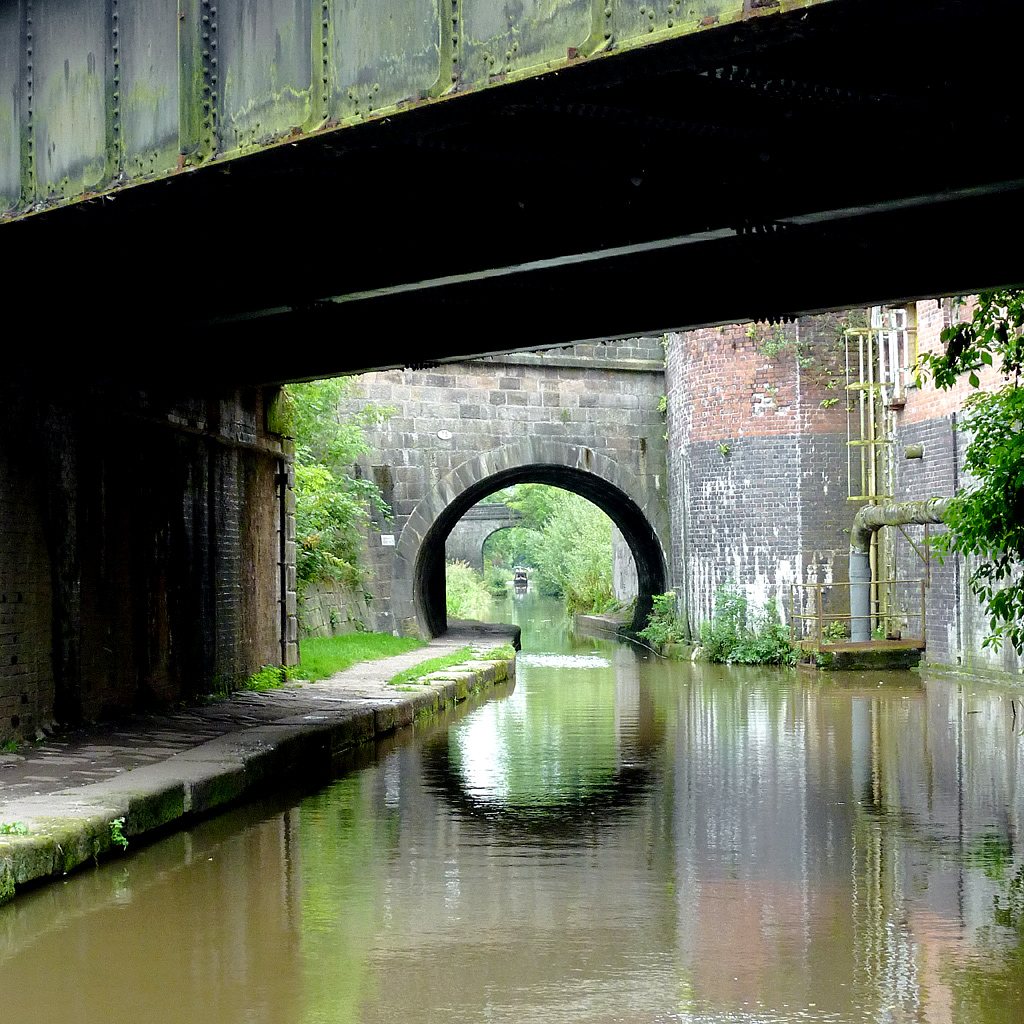
The Macclesfield Canal at Hightown in Congleton

The Macclesfield Canal, completed in 1831, passes through the town. It runs 26 miles (42 km) from Marple Junction at Marple, where it joins the Upper Peak Forest Canal, southwards (through Bollington and Macclesfield), before arriving at Bosley. Having descended the 12 Bosley Locks over the course of about a mile (1.6 km), the canal continues through Congleton to a junction with the Hall Green Branch of the Trent & Mersey Canal at Hall Green. The canal is renowned for its elegant roving bridges. Congleton is one of few places in Britain where a road, canal and railway all cross each other at the same place.

=== Air ===
The nearest airport to the town is Manchester Airport, 20 miles (32 km) away.

== Public services ==
Policing in Congleton is provided by Cheshire Constabulary. The main police station is on Market Square.

Statutory emergency fire and rescue service is provided by the Cheshire Fire and Rescue Service. Congleton Fire Station is on West Road, near the centre of town.

Congleton has a small Non-Accident and Emergency hospital, Congleton War Memorial Hospital, which was built by public subscription in 1924. The town is also served by Leighton Hospital in Crewe, Macclesfield District General Hospital and the University Hospital of North Staffordshire in Stoke-on-Trent.

== Religion ==
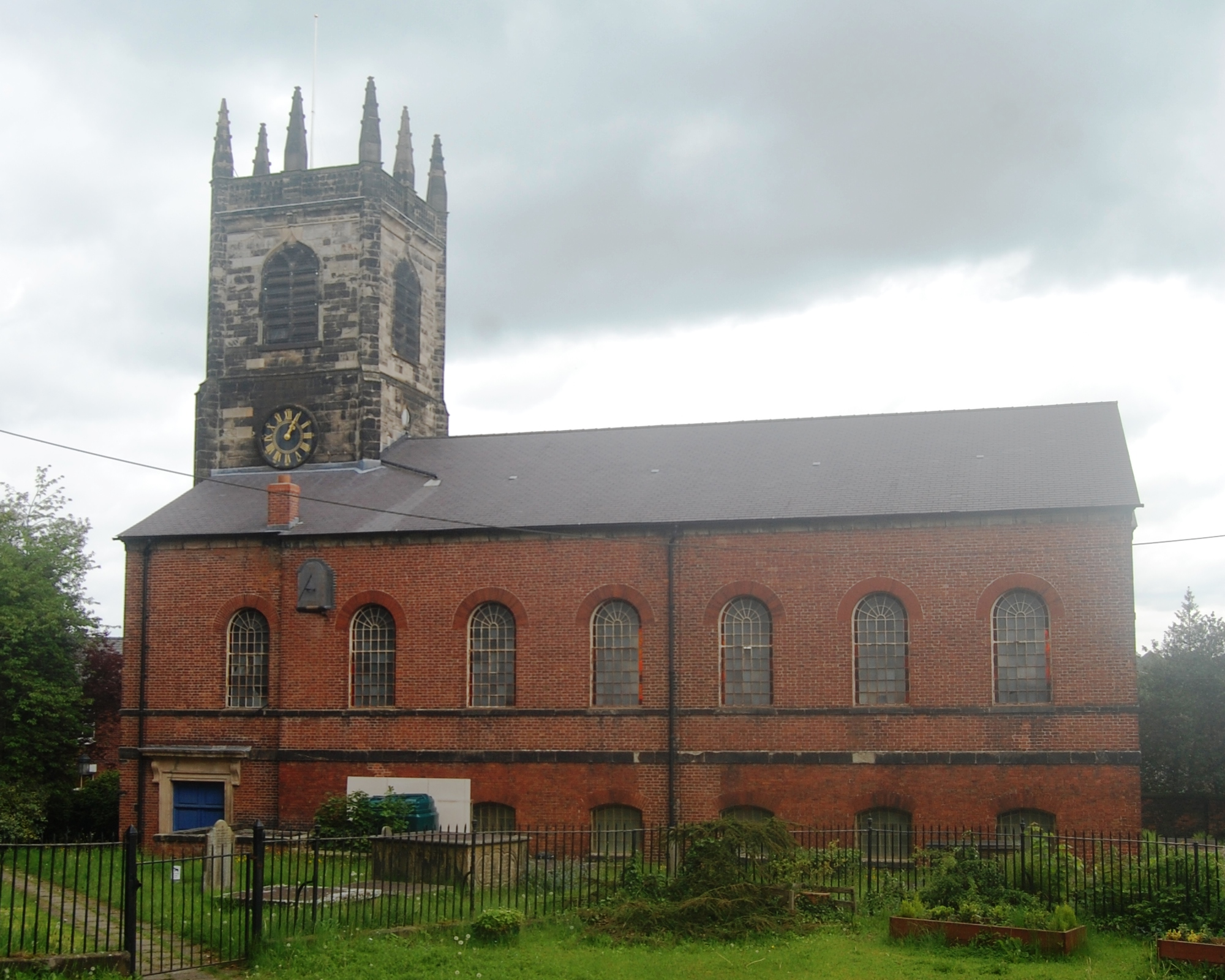
St Peter's Church, Congleton, from the south

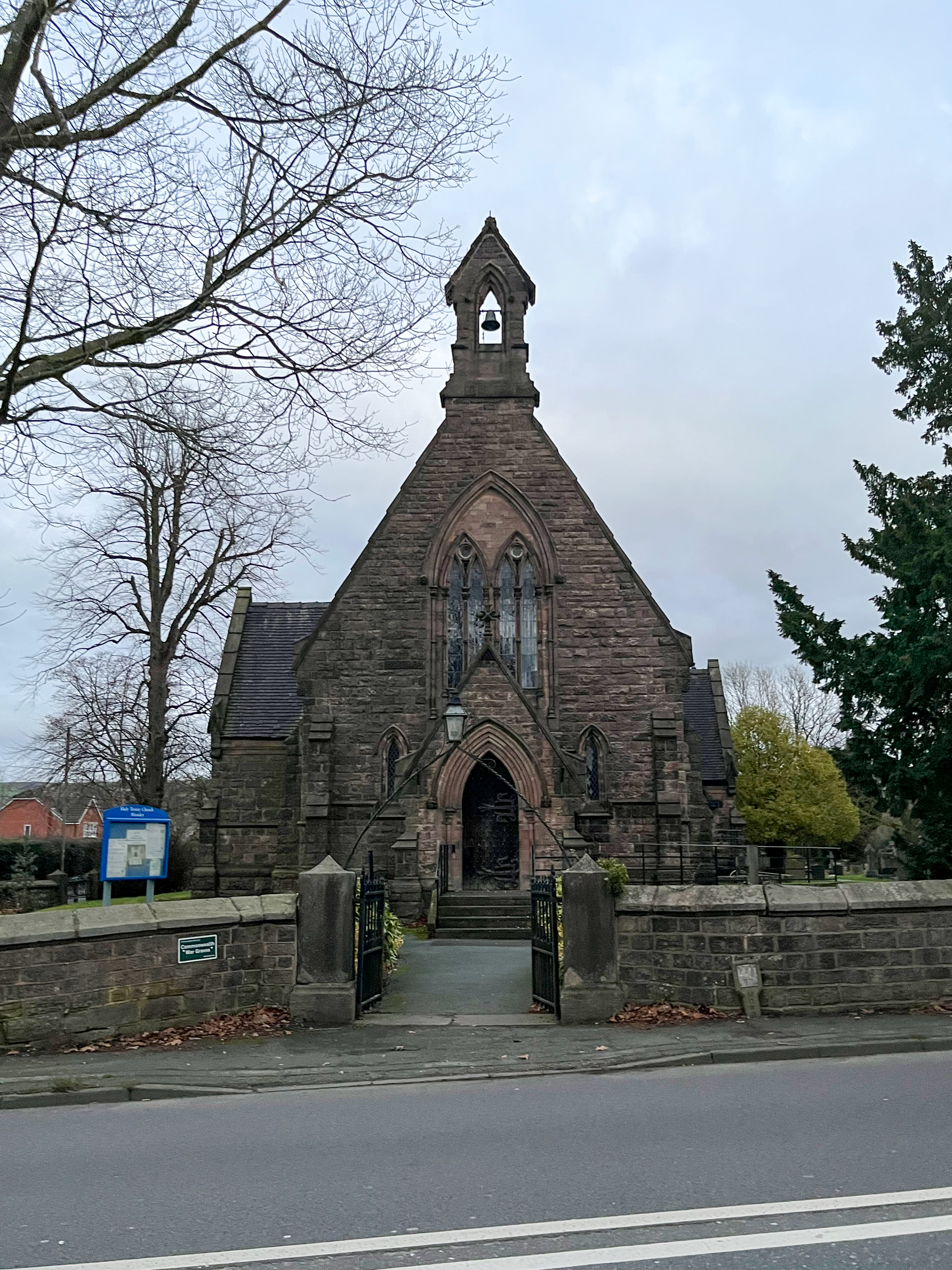
Holy Trinity Church, Mossley, Congleton

The four Anglican churches in Congleton (forming a partnership in the All Saints Congleton parish) are:

- St John's
- St Stephen's
- St Peter's
- Holy Trinity

Congleton Town Council lists eleven other places of worship in the town:

- Congleton Community Baptist Church
- Brookhouse Green Methodist Church
- New Life Church
- Congleton Pentecostal Church
- Rood Lane Methodist Church
- Congleton Spiritualist Church
- St James' Anglican Church
- St Mary's Roman Catholic Church
- Trinity Methodist Church
- Congleton United Reformed Church
- Wellspring Methodist Church
- The Church of Jesus Christ of Latter-day Saints (Mormons)

Historically, Congleton has seen a wide range of Christian church denominations.

- The Friends' Meeting House closed in 1741.
- The Wesleyan Methodist Trinity Chapel, in Wagg Street, was founded in 1766 and was rebuilt in 1808 and again in 1967; the Primitive Methodist Chapel was built in 1821 on Lawton Street, and rebuilt in 1890 on Kinsey Street; the Countess of Huntingdon's Connexion Methodist chapel was founded in 1822; the Congleton Edge Wesleyan Methodist Chapel was built in 1833 and rebuilt in 1889; the Wesleyan Methodist Chapel in Brook Street was built in 1834; the New Connexion Methodist Chapel in Queen Street was built in 1836 and closed in 1969; the Primitive Methodist Chapel in Biddulph Road was built in 1840; the Wesleyan Methodist Chapel in Rood Lane was founded in 1861 and rebuilt in 1886.
- The Unitarian Chapel in Cross Street was founded in 1687 near the Dane Bridge and in 1733 moved to Cross Street, with the present building constructed in 1883 and closed in 1978.
- The United Reformed Church (Independent/Congregationalist) was built in 1790 on Mill Street, and then rebuilt in 1876 on Antrobus Street.

== Education ==
=== Primary schools ===
- Astbury St Mary's C of E School
- Black Firs Primary School
- Buglawton Primary School
- Daven Primary School
- Havannah Primary School
- Marlfields Primary Academy
- Mossley CE Primary School
- St Mary's Catholic Primary School
- The Quinta Primary School

=== High and secondary schools ===
- Congleton High School
- Eaton Bank Academy

=== Special and alternative schools ===
- Aidenswood School
- Esland Daven School

== Notable people ==
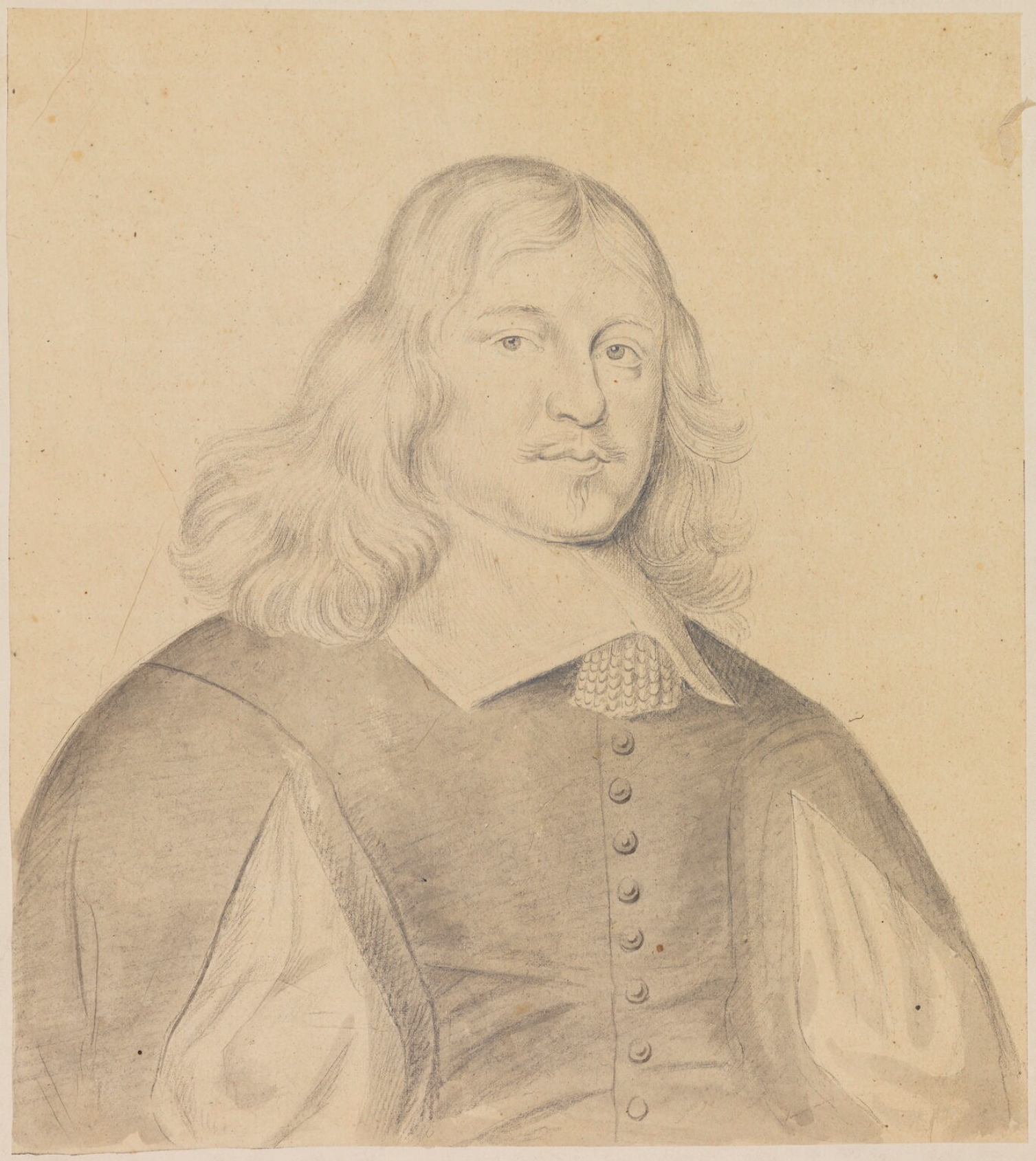
John Bradshaw

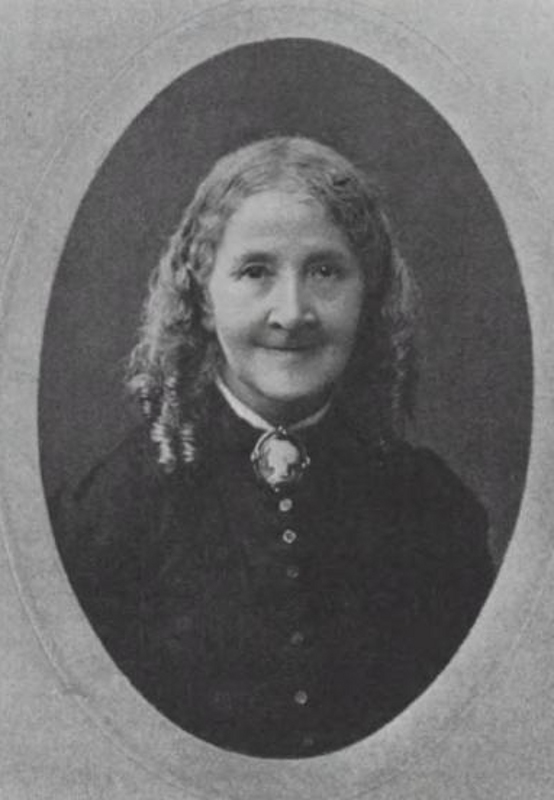
Elizabeth Wolstenholme

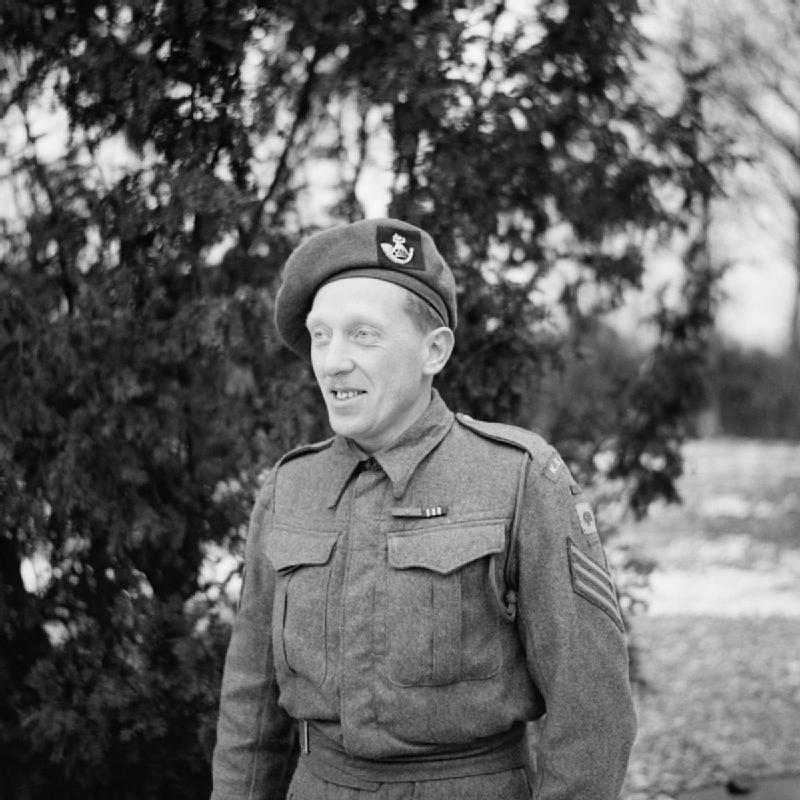
George Harold Eardley VC MM

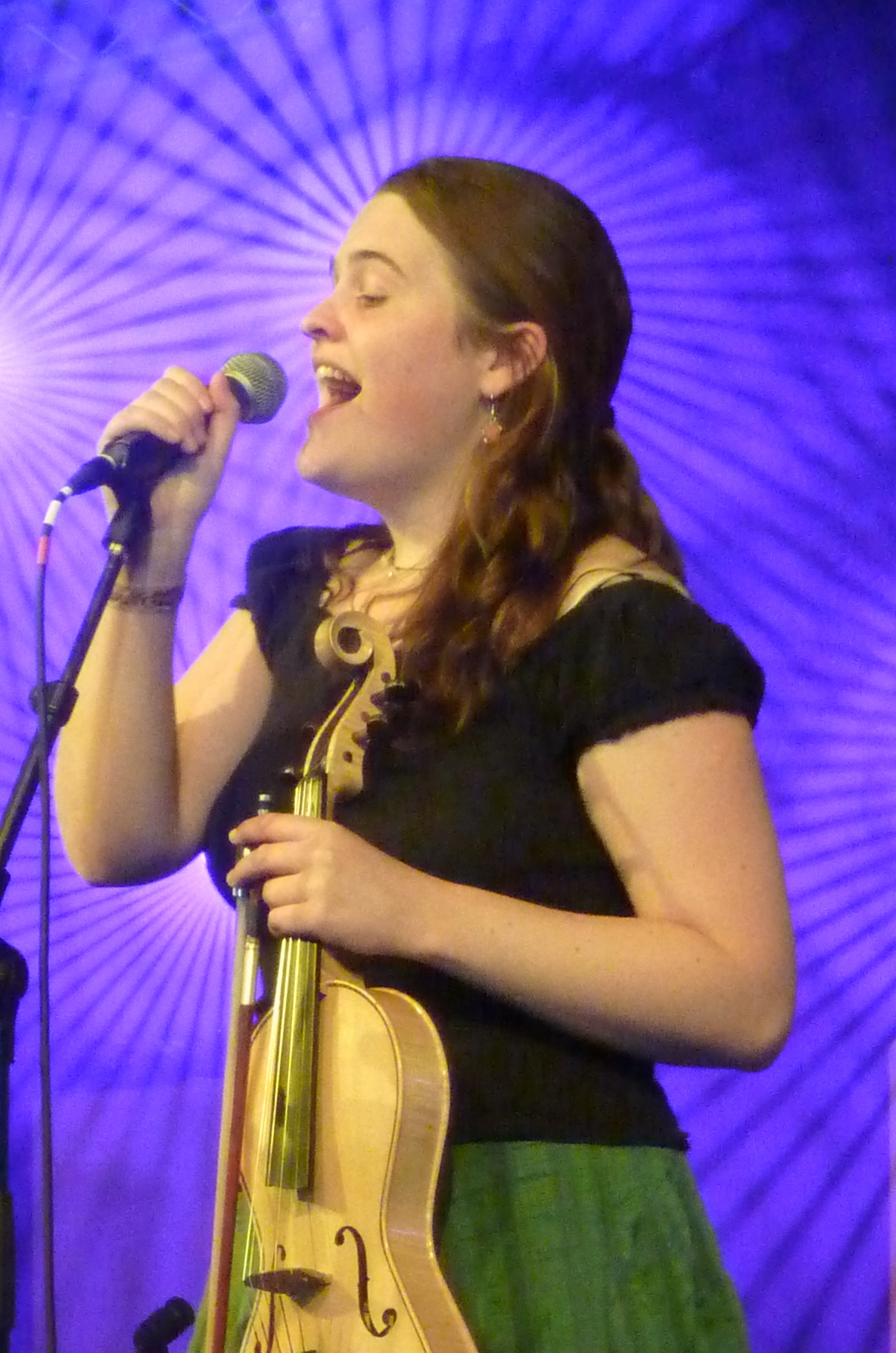
Jackie Oates, 2010

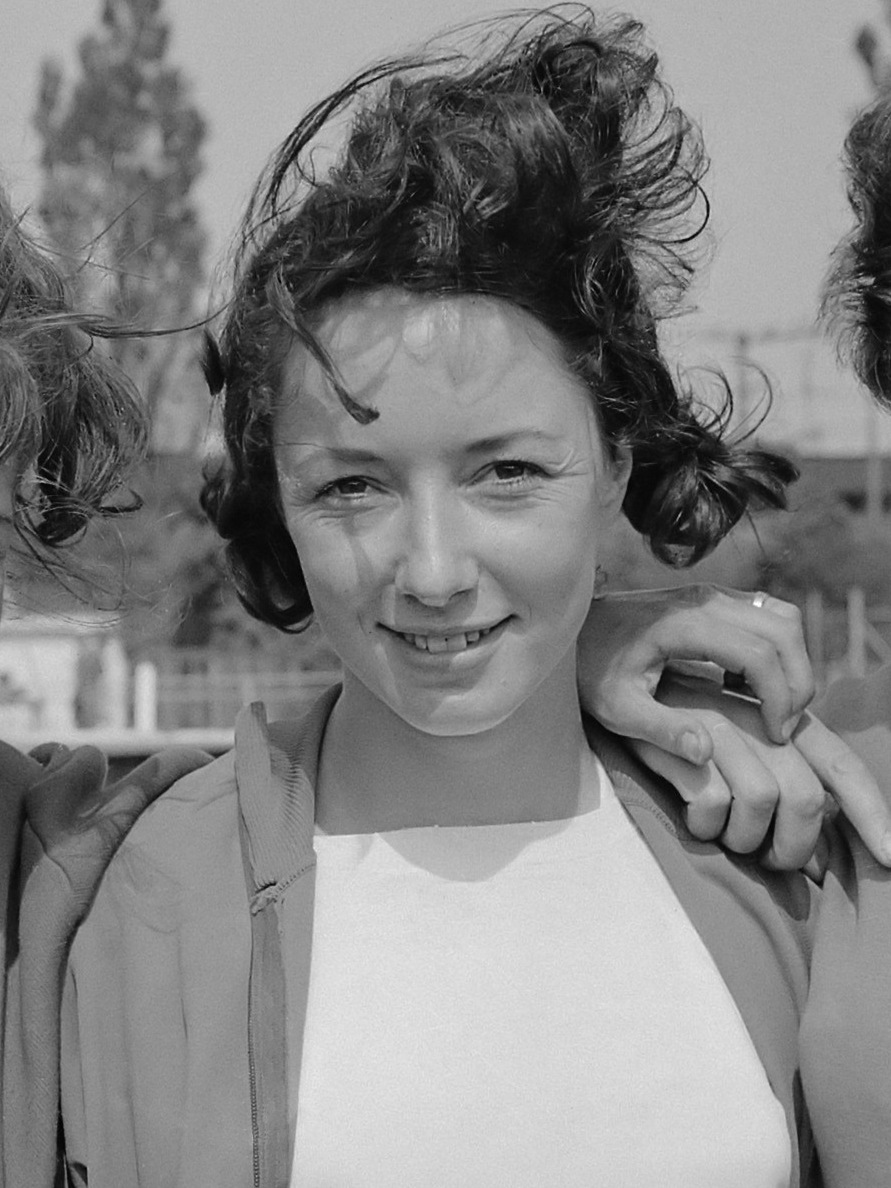
Ann Packer, 1964

=== Public service and commerce ===
- Saint Margaret Ward (ca.1550 – 1588), the "pearl of Tyburn", English Catholic martyr executed during the reign of Elizabeth I for assisting a priest to escape from prison
- John Bradshaw (1602–1659), judge, sat as President of the High Court of Justice for the trial of King Charles I, Mayor of Congleton 1637–1638
- John Whitehurst (1713–1788), clockmaker and scientist, member of the Lunar Society
- Sir John Parnell, 2nd Baronet (1744–1801), Anglo-Irish Member of Parliament; his family originally migrated to Ireland from Congleton
- Robert Hodgson (1773–1844), priest, Dean of Carlisle
- Sir Thomas Reade (1782–1849), British army officer and Napoleon's jailer
- Gibbs Antrobus (1793–1861), diplomat and politician, long-established family in Congleton
- Hewett Watson (1804–1881), phrenologist, botanist and evolutionary theorist
- William Newton (1822–1876), trade unionist, journalist and Chartist
- Dennis Bradwell (1828–1897), silk mill owner and Mayor of Congleton 1875–1878
- Elizabeth Wolstenholme (1833–1918), suffragist, essayist and poet
- Gerald Harrison (1883–1943), Royal Navy Rear-Admiral and cricketer
- Theodora Turner (1907–1999), born in Congleton, nurse and hospital matron
- Frank Kearton, Baron Kearton (1911–1992), life peer, scientist and industrialist
- George Harold Eardley(1912–1991), received the Victoria Cross in 1944
- John Blundell (1952–2014), Director General at the Institute of Economic Affairs
- Dawn Gibbins (1961–2022), entrepreneur, started flooring company Flowcrete in Sandbach with her father
- Sarah Alison Russell (born unknown), MP for Congleton constituency since 5 July 2024

=== Arts ===
- Alan Garner (born 1934), novelist, born in Congleton
- Louise Plowright (1956–2016), actress, born in Congleton
- Emma Bossons (born 1976 in Congleton), ceramic artist and designer for Moorcroft
- Jackie Oates (born 1983 in Congleton), folk singer and fiddle player
- Paul Franklin (born in Congleton), visual effects supervisor

=== Sports ===
- Tommy Clare (1865–1929), international footballer (right-back) and football manager
- George Clawley (1875–1920), football goalkeeper who played 331 games for Southampton and Tottenham Hotspur
- William Yates (1880–1967), racewalker, competed at the 1912 Summer Olympics
- Hugh Moffat (1885–1952), footballer, played 201 games for Burnley and 162 for Oldham Athletic
- Ann Packer (born 1942) and Robbie Brightwell (1939–2022), husband-and-wife Olympic gold medal athletes at the 1964 Summer Olympics. She lives locally.
- Ian Brightwell (born 1968), former Manchester City footballer with 464 club caps; grew up in Congleton
- Paul Ware (1970–2013), footballer who played 233 games including 155 for Stoke City
- John Gimson (born 1983), sailor, silver medallist at the 2020 Summer Olympics, lives in Congleton
- Amy Rodgers (born 2000), football player for Bristol City WFC and Scotland, started her career at Vale Juniors, Congleton

== Twin towns – sister cities ==
Congleton is twinned with:

- Trappes, France, since 16 September 1962

== Aldermen, alderwomen and freemen ==
The following is a list of people who have been either an alderman, alderwoman or freeman of Congleton, and when the title was bestowed.

- A.J. Solly
- Solly
- Ernest Hancock
- J.A. Clayton
- John Smith
- Massie Harper
- Harold Burns
- H.W. Howard
- W.I. Fern J.P.
- S. Maskery
- Fred Jackson (alderman and freeman)
- Frederick Barton
- D. Charlesworth
- W.H. Semper
- R.A. Daniel
- S. Moores
- A. Gleeson
- Jackson JP
- F Jackson
- Shepard
- Wright
- Isaac Salt
- W. H. Semper
- George Harris
- Isaac Fern
- George Rowell
- M. Pass (1937)
- Frank Dale (Freeman 1938, Alderman ???)
- G. Rowell (November 1945)
- W. Newton (November 1945)
- W.F. O'Reilly (November 1945)

== Freedom of Congleton ==
The following is a list of people who have had freedom of Congleton and when the freedom was bestowed.

- S. Maskery (Freedom of the Borough of Congleton 3 October 1927)
- W.L. Fern (Freedom of the Borough of Congleton 14 May 1934)
- W. I. Fern (Freedom of the Borough of Congleton 14 May 1934)
- F. Jackson (Freedom of the Borough of Congleton 2 August 1944)
- Frank Dale MBE (Freedom of the Borough of Congleton 26 October 1953)
- Harry Williams J.P. (Freedom of the Borough of Congleton 26 October 1953)
- H.P. Davidson (Freedom of the Borough of Congleton 17 March 1958)
- A.J. Pirie (Freedom of the Borough of Congleton 2 May 1962)
- D. Charlesworth J.P. (Freedom of the Borough of Congleton 22 May 1967)

== Awards ==
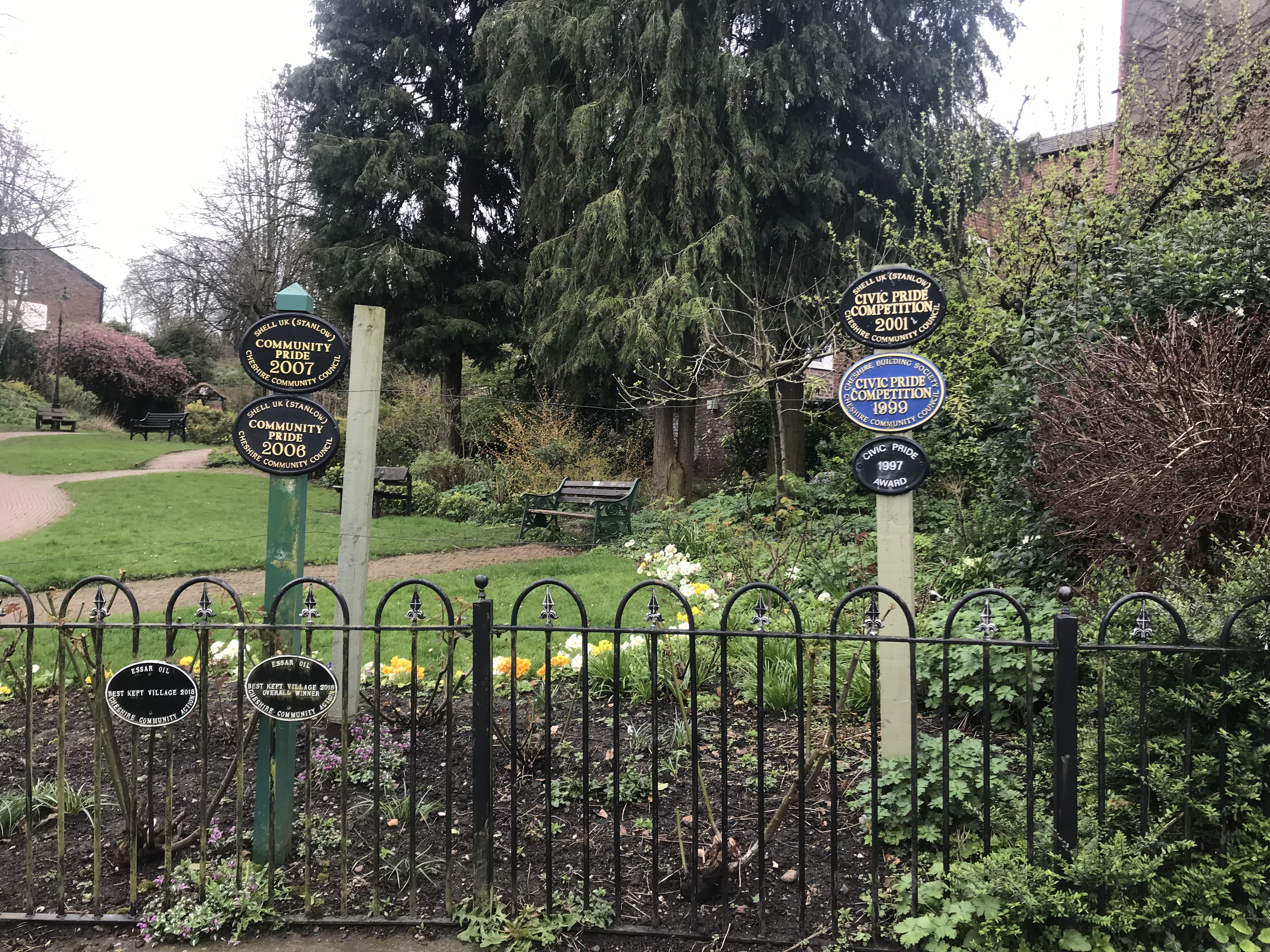
Award Plaques for awards the town of Congleton has won

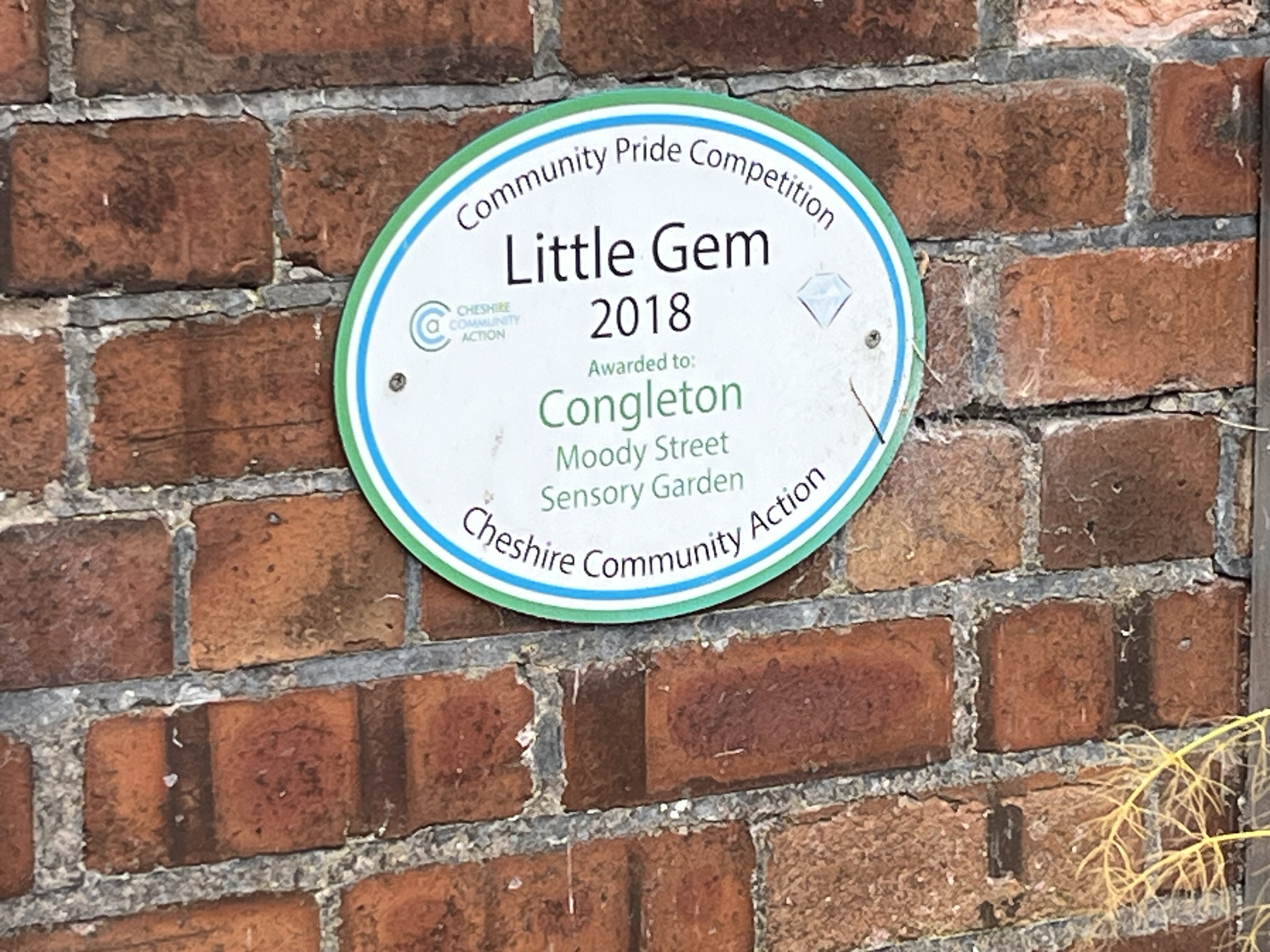
Moody Street, Congleton Sensory Garden Award Plaque

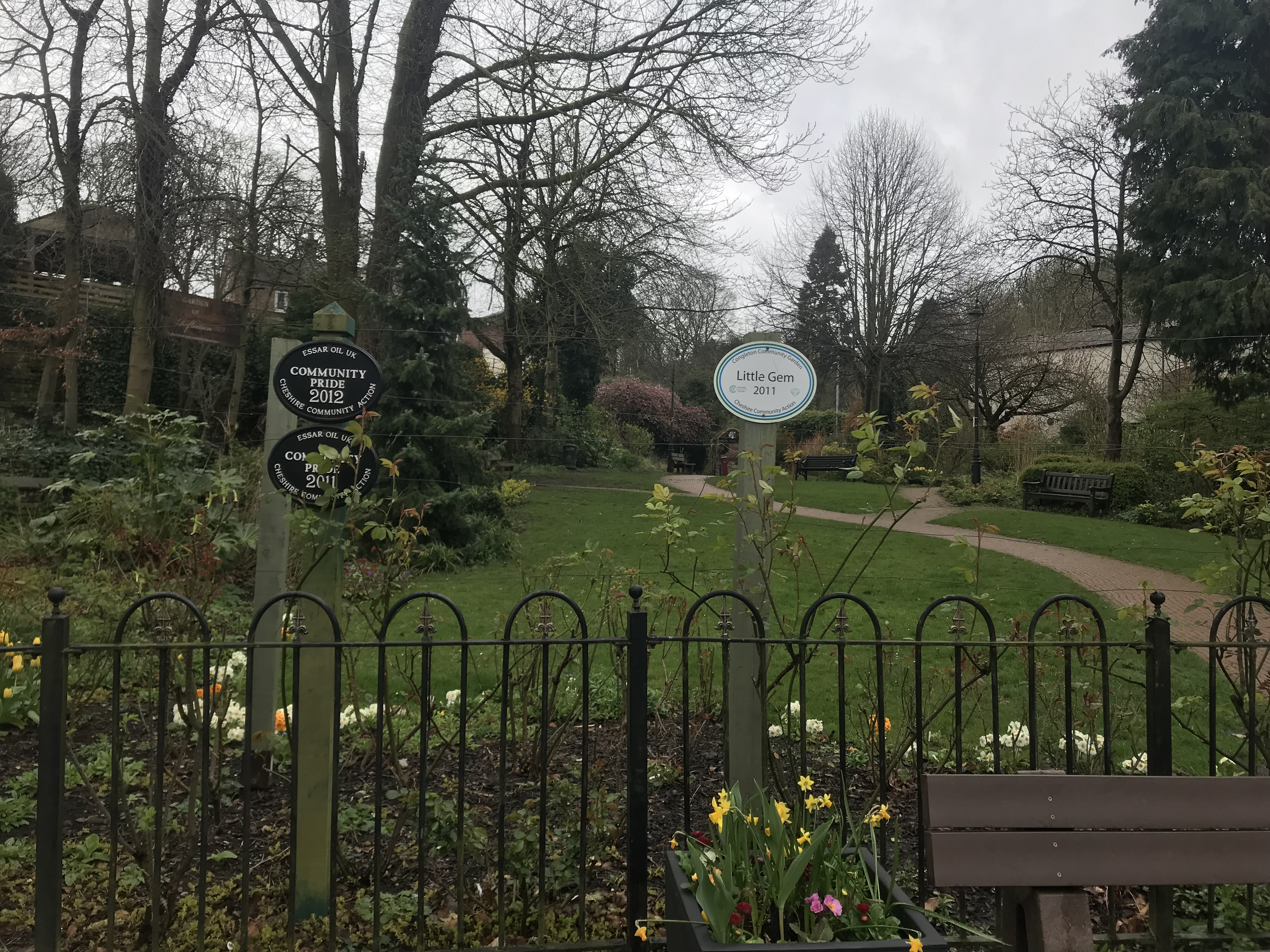
Award Plaques for awards the town of Congleton has won

The following is a list of awards the town of Congleton has won and the year the awards were won.

- World Record: Smallest Cow (???)
- Civic Pride Award (1997) (Note: Source Top photo of Award plaques)
- Civic Pride Competition (1999)
- Civic Pride Competition (2001)
- Community Pride (2006)
- Community Pride (2007)
- World Record: Biggest Maypole Dance (21 May 2008)
- World Record: Most Frisbees Thrown At The Same Time
- Little Gem (2011) (Note: Source Bottom photo of Award plaques)
- Community Pride (2011)
- Community Pride (2012)
- Best Kept Village (2018)
- Best Kept Village Overall Winner (2018)
- Little Gem (2018) (Note: Source Moody Street Sensory Garden Award Plaque photo)

== Gallery ==
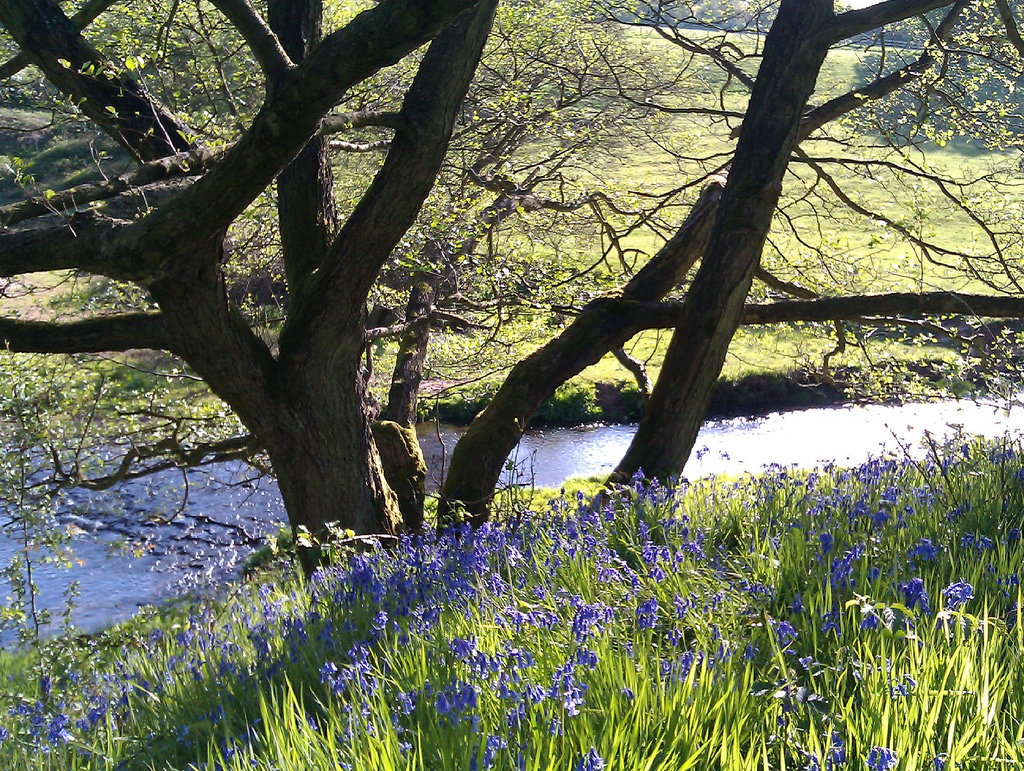
Bluebells at Dane-in-Shaw Brook SSI

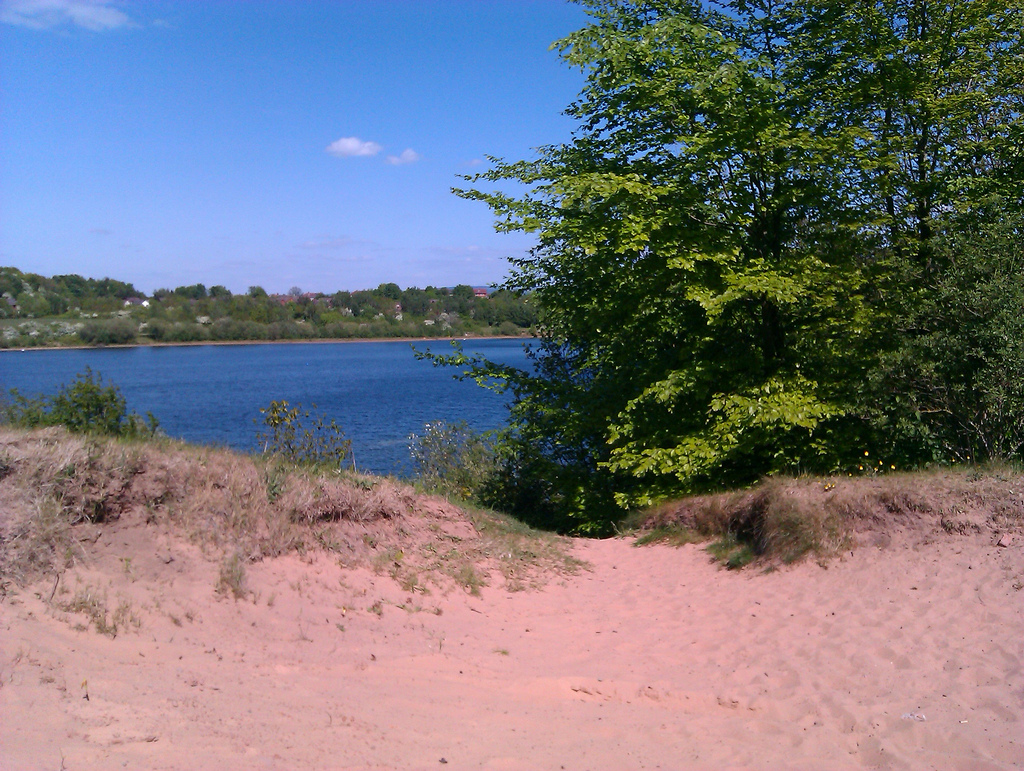
Astbury Mere

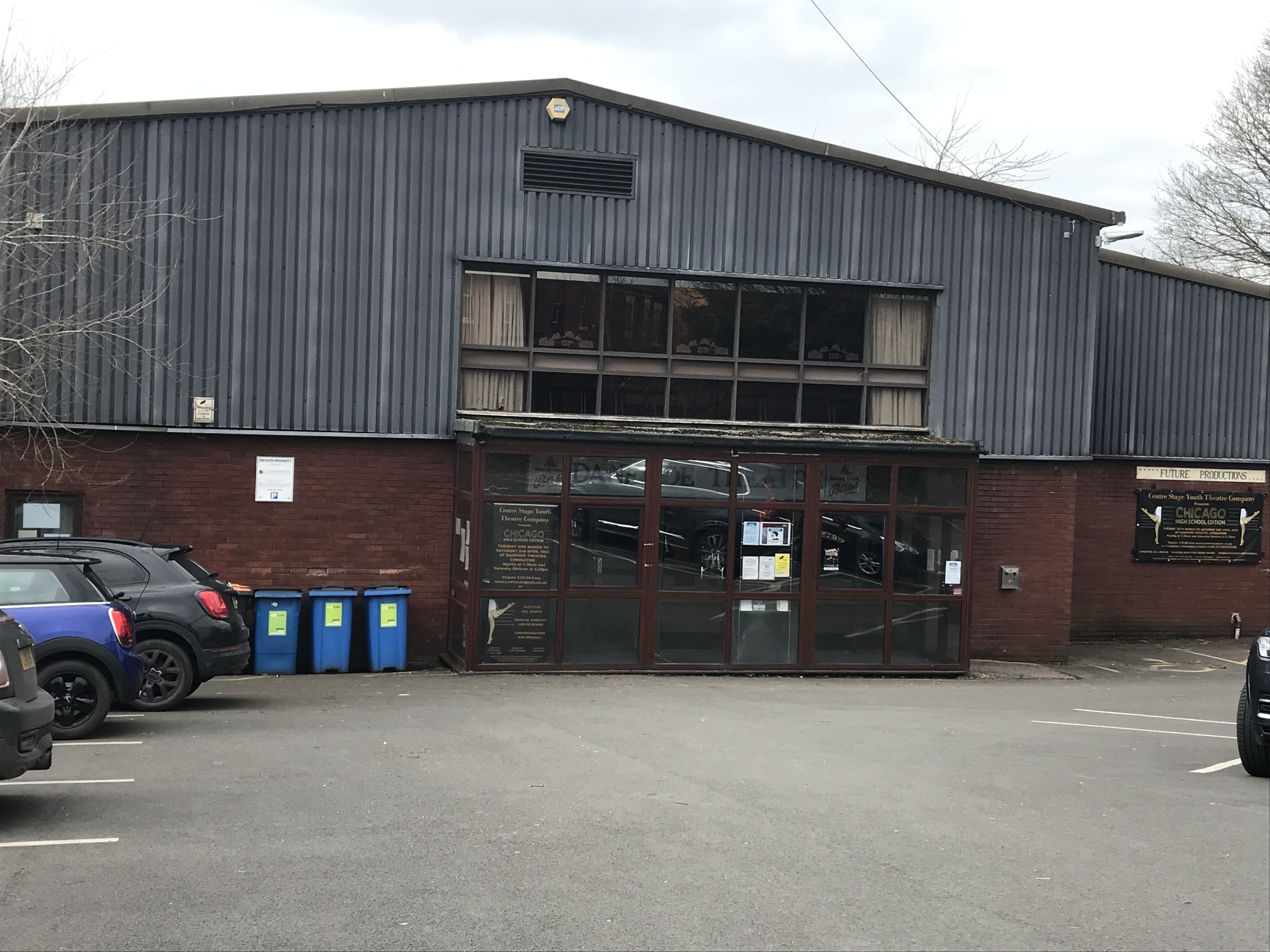
Daneside Theatre in March 2022

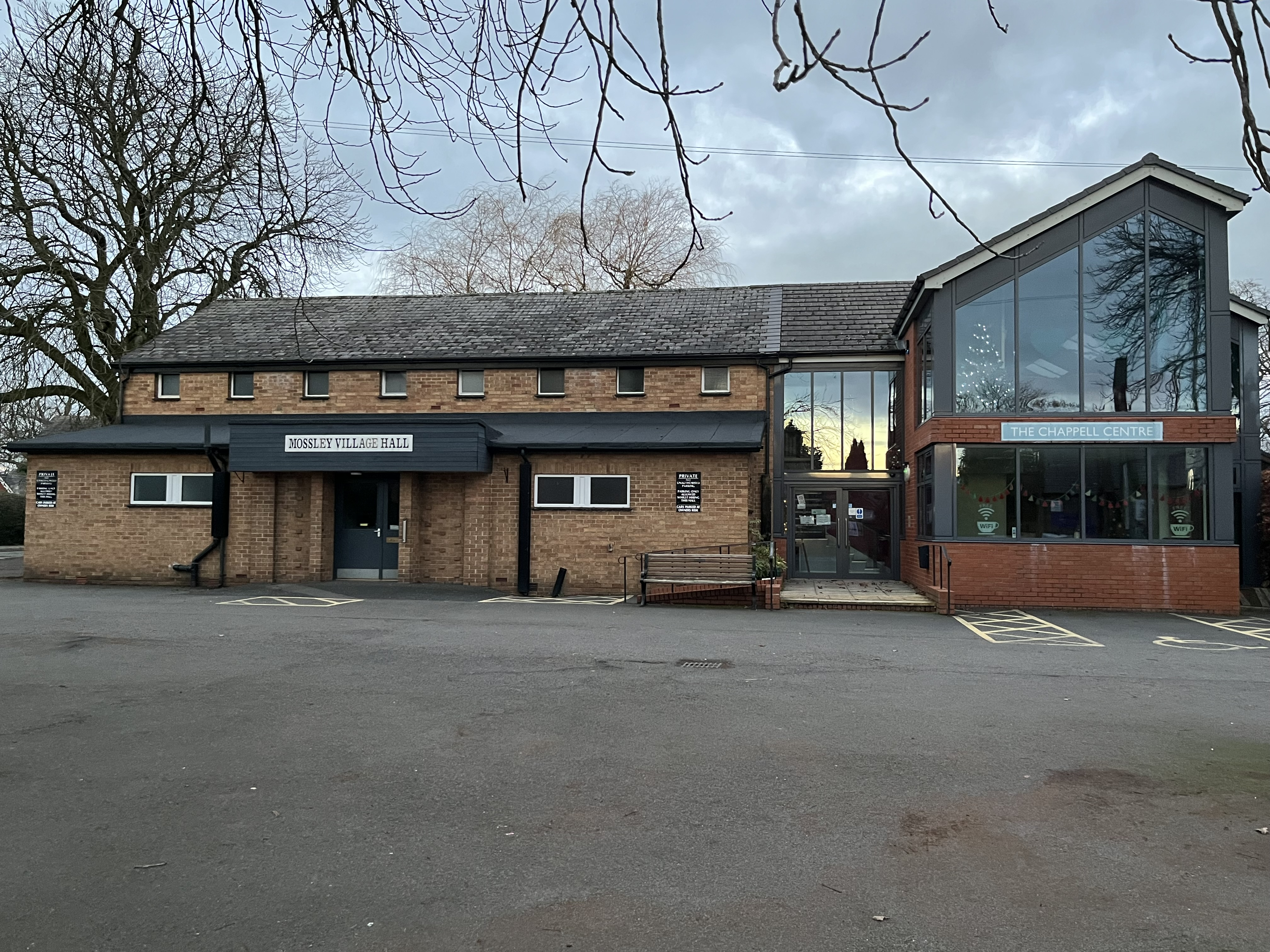
Mossley Village Hall, Mossley, Congleton in 2025

== See also ==
- Listed buildings in Congleton
