= List of films featuring the French Foreign Legion =

This is a list of films featuring the French Foreign Legion in which the Foreign Legion is portrayed either through its plot or by a main character.

The Foreign Legion is an elite unit of the French army, established in 1831, and it has seen action throughout the world, recently in Africa and the Middle East. It has been featured in a large number of films, including a number about the legion itself, such as 1949's Outpost in Morocco.

== List of films ==
Title	Director	Notable cast	Summary	Released	Notes
Abbott and Costello in the Foreign Legion	Charles Lamont	Bud Abbott, Lou Costello		1950	
Adventure in Sahara	D. Ross Lederman	Paul Kelly, C. Henry Gordon, and Lorna Gray	Stationed at Fort Agadez, a lonely French desert outpost in Algeria, Legionnaire Jim Wilson leads a mutiny against his cruel and oppressive commanding officer Captain Savatt.	1938	
Alarm in Morocco	Jean Devaivre	Jean-Claude Pascal, Erich von Stroheim, and Gianna Maria Canale		1953	
Ali Baba Bound	Robert Clampett	Mel Blanc (voice)	Porky Pig discovers a plot by Ali-Baba and his Dirty Sleeves to attack his fort and rushes to warn his fellow legionnaires, only to discover everyone has left for the Legion convention in Boston, and is forced to single-handedly defend the fort with his rented camel.	1940	Animated short film
Arabian Tights	Hal Roach	Charley Chase, Muriel Evans, and Carlton Griffin	After being coerced into joining the Foreign Legion, Charley and his friends are captured and imprisoned by an Arabian sultan.	1933	Comedy short
Beau Geste	Herbert Brenon	Ronald Colman, Neil Hamilton, and Ralph Forbes		1926	Based on the novel of the same name
Beau Geste	William A. Wellman	Gary Cooper, Ray Milland, and Robert Preston		1939	
Beau Geste	Douglas Heyes	Guy Stockwell, Doug McClure, and Leslie Nielsen		1966	
The Last Remake of Beau Geste	Marty Feldman	Marty Feldman, Ann-Margret, and Michael York		1977	
Beau Geste	Douglas Camfield	Benedict Taylor, Anthony Calf, and Jonathon Morris		1982	Television mini-series
Beau Hunks	James W. Horne	Stan Laurel, Oliver Hardy, and James W. Horne	Oliver joins the Foreign Legion after being jilted by his girlfriend dragging his best friend Stanley along with him.	1931	
Beau Ideal	Herbert Brenon	Ralph Forbes, Loretta Young, and Irene Rich	Otis Madison joins the French Foreign Legion in order to rescue a boyhood friend held prisoner in Morocco.	1931	
Beau Sabreur	John Waters	Gary Cooper, Evelyn Brent, and Noah Beery		1928	Lost film
Beau Travail	Claire Denis	Denis Lavant, Michel Subor, and Grégoire Colin	Galoup reflects on his career as a Foreign Legion officer, leading troops in the Gulf of Djibouti, and his jealous rivalry with young recruit Gilles Sentain.	1999	Awards: 5 total
Captain Gallant of the Foreign Legion	Lester Fuller	Buster Crabbe, Fuzzy Knight, and Cullen Crabbe	This early U.S. television series followed the adventures of Capt. Michael Gallant and his fellow Foreign Legionnaires	1955-1957	One of the few American television series in the 1950s to be filmed outside the US, most being limited to California, with the show being shot on location in Morocco. Several episodes were edited into the 1954 film Desert Outpost.
China Gate	Samuel Fuller	Gene Barry, Angie Dickinson, and Nat King Cole	Sergeant Brock and Goldie, ex-American Korean War veterans serving as French Foreign Legion mercenaries in the First Indochina War, are ordered to lead a squad to blow up an arms depot near the Chinese border.	1957	
Desert Hell	Charles Marquis Warren	Brian Keith, Barbara Hale, and Richard Denning		1958	
Desert Legion	Joseph Pevney	Alan Ladd, Richard Conte, and Arlene Dahl		1953	
Desert Sands	Lesley Selander	Ralph Meeker, Marla English, and J. Carrol Naish		1955	
The Desert Song	Roy Del Ruth	John Boles, Carlotta King, and Louise Fazenda		1929	Based on the operatta of the same name.
The Desert Song	Robert Florey	Dennis Morgan, Irene Manning, and Bruce Cabot		1943	
The Desert Song	H. Bruce Humberstone	Kathryn Grayson, Gordon MacRae, and Steve Cochran		1953	
The Devil's in Love	William Dieterle	Victor Jory, Loretta Young, and Vivienne Osborne		1933	
Drums of the Desert	George Waggner	Ralph Byrd, Lorna Gray, and George Lynn		1940	
Due della legione straniera	Lucio Fulci	Franco and Ciccio, and Alighiero Noschese		1962	
Escape from Sahara	Wolfgang Staudte	Hildegard Knef, Bernhard Wicki and Hannes Messemer		1958	
Escape to the Foreign Legion	Louis Ralph	Hans Stüwe, Alexander Murski, Eva von Berne		1929	
Flesh and the Woman	Robert Siodmak	Gina Lollobrigida, Jean-Claude Pascal, and Peter van Eyck		1954	
Die Flucht aus der Hölle	Hans-Erich Korbschmitt	Armin Mueller-Stahl		1960	
The Flying Deuces	A. Edward Sutherland	Stan Laurel, Oliver Hardy, and Jean Parker		1939	
Follow that Camel	Gerald Thomas	Phil Silvers, Kenneth Williams, and Jim Dale		1967	
The Foreign Legion	Edward Sloman	Norman Kerry, Lewis Stone, and Crauford Kent		1928	Considered a lost film.
Fort Algiers	Lesley Selander	Yvonne De Carlo, Carlos Thompson, and Raymond Burr		1953	
Fremdenlegionär Kirsch	Philipp Lothar Mayring	Max Kirsch, Philipp Lothar Mayring, Benno Norbert		1921	
Le Grand Jeu	Jacques Feyder	Marie Bell, Pierre Richard-Willm, and Charles Vanel		1934	
Hermoso Ideal	Alejandro Galindo	Conchita Martínez, Rodolfo Landa, and Alejandro Ciangherotti	Version of Beau Ideal (1931)	1948	
Invincible	Blackie Ko	Dave Wong, Sharla Cheung and Blackie Ko	A timid triad member fled to France with his lover after killing a rival gang boss accidentally, in order to earn a living and to gain a French nationality, he joins the Foreign Legion.	1992	
Juarez	William Dieterle	Paul Muni, Bette Davis, and Brian Aherne		1939	
Jump into Hell	David Butler	Jacques Sernas, Peter van Eyck, and Marcel Dalio		1955	
Legion of Missing Men	Hamilton MacFadden	Ralph Forbes, Ben Alexander, and Hala Linda		1937	
Legion of the Doomed	Thor L. Brooks	Bill Williams, Dawn Richard, and Anthony Caruso		1958	
Legione Straniera	Basilio Franchina	Viviane Romance, Marc Lawrence, and Alberto Farnese		1953	
Legionnaire	Peter MacDonald	Jean-Claude Van Damme, Adewale Akinnuoye-Agbaje, and Steven Berkoff	A 1920s boxer who wins a fight after having been hired by gangsters to lose it, then flees to join the French Foreign Legion	1998	
Lionheart	Sheldon Lettich	Jean-Claude Van Damme, Harrison Page, and Deborah Rennard	When his brother is seriously injured, a paratrooper legionnaire returns to Los Angeles to enter the underground fighting circuit to raise money for his brother's family	1990	
Little Beau Porky	Frank Tashlin (as Frank Tash)	Joe Dougherty (voice, uncredited), Billy Bletcher (vocie, uncredited)	Porky Pig is ordered by his Commandant to wash the Commanadant's camel. A cable arrives, saying that Ali Mode's Riff Raffs have attacked, and the Commandant and everyone except Porky march to the rescue. However, Ali Mode and his men later attack the fort and Porky must defend his post single-handedly.	1936	Animated short film
Lost in the Legion	Fred C. Newmeyer	A. Bromley Davenport, Betty Fields and Leslie Fuller		1934	
A Man Called Sarge	Stuart Gillard	Gary Kroeger, Gretchen German, and Marc Singer		1990	
March or Die	Dick Richards	Gene Hackman, Terence Hill, and Catherine Deneuve		1977	
Marcia o Crepa	Frank Wisbar	Stewart Granger, Dorian Gray, and Carlos Casaravilla		1962	Known as The Legion's Last Patrol in the United Kingdom and Commando in the United States.
Marocco en het Vreemdelingenlegioen	Theo Frenkel			1912	
La Légion saute sur Kolwezi	Raoul Coutard	Bruno Cremer, Mimsy Farmer, and Giuliano Gemma	Based on the French intervention during the 1978 military coup in Kolwezi.	1980	Known as Military Coup in Kolwezi in the United States.
Les Morfalous	Henri Verneuil	Jean-Paul Belmondo, Jacques Villeret, and Michel Constantin		1984	
Morocco	Josef von Sternberg	Gary Cooper, Marlene Dietrich, and Adolphe Menjou		1930	Film was selected to the National Film Registry in 1992.
The Mummy	Stephen Sommers	Brendan Fraser, Rachel Weisz, and John Hannah		1999	
Outpost in Morocco	Robert Florey	George Raft, Marie Windsor, and Akim Tamiroff		1949	
Renegades	Victor Fleming	Warner Baxter, Myrna Loy, and Noah Beery		1930	
Rogues' Regiment	Robert Florey	Dick Powell, Märta Torén, and Vincent Price		1948	
Savate	Isaac Florentine	Olivier Gruner		1995	
Savior	Predrag Antonijevic	Dennis Quaid, Nastassja Kinski, and Pascal Rollin		1998	
Scorching Sands	Hal Roach, Robin Williamson	Stan Laurel, James Finlayson, and Katherine Grant		1923	
Secondhand Lions	Tim McCanlies	Haley Joel Osment, Michael Caine, and Robert Duvall		2003	
Sergeant X	Vladimir Strizhevsky	Ivan Mozzhukhin, Trude von Molo, and Peter Voß		1932	
Sergeant X of the Foreign Legion	Bernard Borderie	Noëlle Adam, Christian Marquand, and Paul Guers		1960	
Il sergente Klems	Sergio Grieco	Peter Strauss, Tina Aumont, and Pier Paolo Capponi		1971	Known as Man of Legend internationally.
Siren of Atlantis	Gregg G. Tallas	Maria Montez, Jean-Pierre Aumont, and Dennis O'Keefe		1949	
Ten Tall Men	Willis Goldbeck	Burt Lancaster, Jody Lawrance, and Gilbert Roland		1951	
The Three Musketeers	Colbert Clark, Armand Schaefer	Jack Mulhall, Raymond Hatton, Ralph Bushman, and John Wayne		1933	The Three Musketeers serial was edited into the 1946 film Desert Command.
Timbuktu	Jacques Tourneur	Victor Mature, Yvonne De Carlo and George Dolenz		1959	
Totò sceicco	Mario Mattoli	Totò		1950	
Trouble in Morocco	Ernest B. Schoedsack	Jack Holt, Mae Clarke and Paul Hurst		1937	
Two Mules for Sister Sara	Don Siegel	Shirley MacLaine, Clint Eastwood	Two fortune hunting mercenaries assist Mexican revolutionaries to fight the French.	1970	Set during the French intervention in Mexico
Un de la légion	Christian-Jaque	Fernandel, Robert Le Vigan, and Daniel Mendaille		1936	
Under Two Flags	J. Gordon Edwards	Theda Bara, Herbert Heyes, and Stuart Holmes		1916	Based on the novel of the same name. Considered a lost film.
Under Two Flags	Tod Browning	Priscilla Dean, James Kirkwood and John Davidson		1922	
Under Two Flags	Frank Lloyd	Ronald Colman, Claudette Colbert, and Victor McLaglen		1936	
Under Two Jags	George Jeske	Stan Laurel		1923	
The Unknown	George Melford	Lou Tellegen, Theodore Roberts, and Dorothy Davenport		1915	
Wages of Virtue	Allan Dwan	Gloria Swanson, Ben Lyon, Norman Trevor, Ivan Linow, Armand Cortes, Adrienne D'Ambricourt		1924	
Wee Wee Monsieur	Del Lord	Moe Howard, Larry Fine, and Curly Howard		1938	Comedy short
We're in the Legion Now!	Crane Wilbur	Reginald Denny, Esther Ralston and Vince Barnett		1936	
The Winding Stair	John Griffith Wray	Alma Rubens, Edmund Lowe and Warner Oland		1950	
