= John Nesfield =

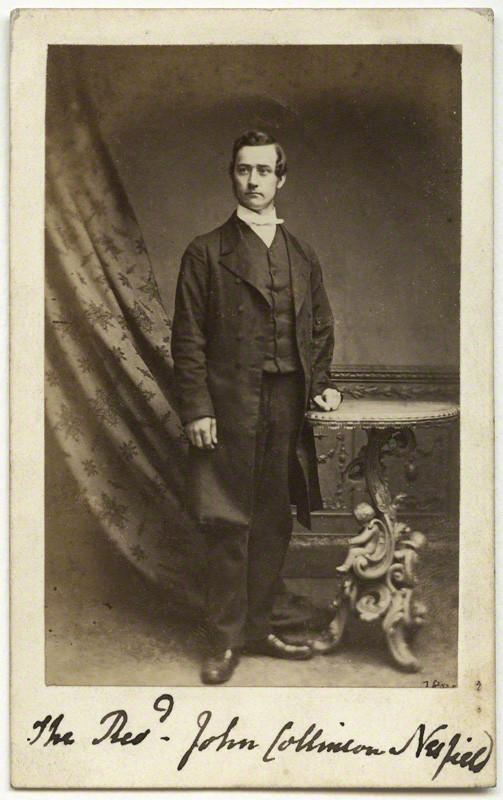
John Collinson Nesfield, 1860

John Collinson Nesfield (14 August 1836 – 28 June 1919) served in various roles as an educator in British India and was for some time curate of St Michael's Church, Highgate, London. He wrote numerous books, of which his works on grammar were particularly influential.

== Life ==
John Nesfield was born in 1836 and was the son of a cleric from Wiltshire, England. He attended Highgate Grammar School from 1852 to 1855 and later taught there from 1859 to 1864. He became a postmaster (holder of a senior scholarship) at Merton College at the University of Oxford. There he earned a BA degree in 1860 and was later promoted to an MA in 1862.

Nesfield became the curate of St Michael's Church, Highgate, in Middlesex. He began his career in British India in January 1867. There he served initially as a professor at Presidency College and Krishnagar Government College, both in the Bengal Presidency, before becoming in May 1872 a Director of Public Instruction (DPI) and schools inspector in Lower Burma. The Indian Education Service was not founded until 1896 and thus he was an employee of the provincial government. In his role as a DPI he took on responsibility for administration and policy-making, rather than being purely a teacher. (Note: There were 102 people from Britain employed in education by provincial governments in 1879, ranked in four Grades, descending from I and IV, and headed by one DPI per province. However, British Burma and Assam did not have DPIs, with that role being given to people ranked at Grade II. The Assam DPI was indeed the only British educator there, while in Burma there was also a Grade III educator.)

Nesfield transferred from Lower Burma to become DPI in Oudh State in March 1874, then in 1878 became principal of Benares College when the administration of Oudh was subsumed in the newly created North-Western Provinces and Oudh. He joined the inspectorate there in the following year and in 1885 was passed over for promotion to become the province's DPI when, as was not uncommon, the government determined to prefer Edmund White, who was a member of the Indian Civil Service, to an educator. Nesfield objected strenuously to this decision, firing off letters first to the Secretary of State for the province, R. A. Cross, 1st Viscount Cross, and then to Alfred Comyn Lyall, who was the Lieutenant-Governor of the North-Western Provinces and Chief Commissioner of Oudh. When those appeals failed, he wrote also to the Viceroy of India, Frederick Hamilton-Temple-Blackwood, 1st Marquess of Dufferin and Ava, but was again rebuffed. He eventually did achieve the promotion when White retired in August 1892. He had been made a Fellow of the University of Allahabad in 1887, the year of its establishment, and retired from India in October 1894.

Issues of promotion were not the only thing about which Nesfield complained during his time in India. Education was particularly poorly developed in the North-Western Provinces and in 1882 he asked the province's Education Commission "what hope is there of reaching the heart or brain of a man who is educated at a cost of four rupees a year?" He was also involved in a dispute that persisted for a while after he retired. There had been investigations regarding whether many of the English and vernacular textbooks prescribed for use in schools of the North-Western Provinces had been contrived so as to provide him with a monopoly on publication. It was eventually agreed that he had acted under the instructions of White, had done so at his own risk, and was providing a much-needed service. He gave the copyrights to a publisher in London after retiring.

He had married a missionary, Ellen Blumhardt, and the couple had many children, including Vincent Blumhardt Nesfield who pioneered the use of chlorine in water purification. Nesfield died in 1919.

== Influence ==
cover of Nesfield's Manual of English Grammar and Composition (1908)

=== Education ===
Nesfield's English Grammar: Past and Present was originally written for the market in colonial India. It was later expanded to appeal to students in Britain as well, from young men preparing for various professional examinations to students in "Ladies' Colleges". Other books on the English language by Nesfield include A Junior Course In English Composition, A Senior Course In English Composition, but it was his A Manual Of English Grammar and Composition that proved really successful both in Britain and her colonies — so much so that it formed the basis for many other grammar and composition primers including but not limited to Warriner's English Grammar and Composition, and High School English Grammar and Composition, fondly called Wren & Martin by P. C. Wren and H. Martin. Bibliographer Manfred Görlach is critical, saying of the frequently reprinted English Grammar: Past and Present that "it is not quite easy to see how its wordiness, lack of clear structure, mixture of synchronic description and diachronic explanation and often unclear definitions gave the book the immense impact it had".

=== Anthropology ===
Like Denzil Ibbetson, an administrator of the British Raj, Nesfield believed that the society of the North-Western Provinces in British India did not permit the rigid imposition of an administratively defined caste construct as Herbert Hope Risley advocated. According to Nesfield, society there was less governed by ideas of caste based on varna and instead was more open and fluid. Tribes, which he considered to be kin-based groups that dominated small areas, were the dominant feature of rural life. Caste designators, such as Jat and Rajput, were status-based titles to which any tribe that rose to social prominence could lay a claim, and which could be dismissed by their peers if they declined.

The debate about caste reflected the contemporary debate around topics such as scientific racism and the Aryan invasion theory. Anthropologist Ellen Bal notes that

Nesfield denied any general difference between so-called Aryan and aboriginal blood, arguing that Aryan blood had been mixed with the indigenous by the time the caste system evolved. Risley, on the other hand, maintained that the primary distinction was one of race. He argued that social ranking was a matter of purity of blood, with the communities of pure Aryan and pure aboriginal stock at top and bottom respectively.

== Works ==
Nesfield's publications include:

- An Essay on the Kanjar Tribe (1882)
- On the Results of Primary Education in the North-Western Provinces and Oudh (1883)
- Brief View of the Caste System of the North-Western Provinces and Oudh (1885)
- The Function of Modern Brahmins in Upper India (1887)
- Two Essays on the Mushera Tribe (1888)
- English Grammar: Past and Present (1898)
- A Junior Course In English Composition, A Senior Course In English Composition
- A Manual of English Grammar and Composition (1898)
- English Grammar Series
