= Beau Ideal (1948 film) =

1948 film

- Directed by: Alejandro Galindo
- Written by: Alejandro Galindo; Salvador Novo
- Based on: Beau Ideal by P.C. Wren
- Produced by: José M. Noriega
- Starring: Conchita Martínez; Rodolfo Landa; Alejandro Ciangherotti
- Cinematography: José Ortiz Ramos
- Edited by: Jorge Bustos
- Music by: Raúl Lavista
- Production company: Ramex Films
- Distributed by: RKO Radio Pictures de México
- Release date: 25 December 1948
- Running time: 81 minutes
- Country: Mexico
- Language: Spanish

Beau Ideal (Spanish: Hermoso ideal) is a 1948 Mexican adventure film directed by Alejandro Galindo and starring Conchita Martínez, Rodolfo Landa and Alejandro Ciangherotti. It is an adaptation of the 1927 novel Beau Ideal by P.C. Wren, previously made into a 1931 American film of the same title. It was shot at the Churubusco Studios in Mexico City. The film's sets were designed by the art director Gunther Gerszo.

== Cast ==
- Conchita Martínez as Isabel Rubio
- Rodolfo Landa as Rafael Landa y Rincón / Rafael del Rey
- Alejandro Ciangherotti as Pablo Argote
- Alejandro Cobo as Capitán
- Manuel Arvide as Don Agustin Landa y Rincón
- José Ortiz de Zárate as Don Luis Argote
- Lily Aclemar as Bailarina
- Aurora Walker as Tía de Isabel
- José Baviera as Emir
- Juan Calvo as Don Pedro Rubio
- Francisco Reiguera as Jacobo Levine
- Ramón Vallarino as Ramón
- Rodolfo Acosta as Legionario
- Roberto Cañedo as Legionario
- Nicolás Rodríguez as Espectador sevillano

== Bibliography ==
- Riera, Emilio García. Historia documental del cine mexicano: 1946-1948. Universidad de Guadalajara, 1992
- Wilt, David E. The Mexican Filmography, 1916 through 2001. McFarland, 2024.
