= De Stefani =

De Stefani is a surname. Notable people with the surname include:

- Joseph De Stefani (1879–1940), American actor
- Theodosio De Stefani Perez (1853–1935), Spanish scientist

== See also ==
- De Stefanis, an Italian surname
