= Beau Peep =

British comic strip

- Author: Roger Kettle
- Launch date: 2 November 1978
- End date: December 2016
- Publisher: The Daily Star
- Genre: Comedy

Beau Peep was a popular British comic strip written by Roger Kettle and illustrated by Andrew Christine. The strip features the misadventures of the eponymous lead character, Beau Peep, an inept and cowardly British man who joins the tough and hardy French Foreign Legion in the deserts of North Africa to escape his terrifying wife Doris back home. There are also numerous surreal supporting characters.

== Origins ==
Beau Peep was first published in the launch issue of British newspaper The Daily Star on 2 November 1978, and ran until late 2016.

Kettle and Christine also produced the popular cowboy strip A Man Called Horace which was featured daily in the Daily Mirror and Daily Record until 1 August 2015. This strip was commissioned in 1989 by Mirror Group Newspapers in an attempt to lure the Beau Peep fan base from the Daily Star.

Roger Kettle also scripts Andy Capp for the Daily Mirror. The strip is drawn by Roger Mahoney.

Beau Peep was originally intended as a parody of Beau Geste, a 1924 adventure novel by British author P. C. Wren, which has itself been adapted for the screen several times, and again parodied even more. However Beau Peep grew to have a distinctive character and identity in its own right and is perhaps the most famous of these parodies of Beau Geste, still retaining a large fan base.

On the forum of the official Beau Peep website, writer Roger Kettle also claims to have been inspired by the American comic strip Peanuts by Charles M. Schulz, in that like Schulz's creation Charlie Brown, Beau Peep is a "loveable loser".

== Publication history ==
As well as daily appearances in The Daily Star, paperback anthologies of Beau Peep were published every year between 1980 and 1998. A total of 20 books were published, including, in 1987, a special 'Colour Collection'. These have been issued through various publishing houses, most notably by Pedigree Books. Some comic strips are available for viewing online on the Beau Peep official website.

A new collection of strips called "The Return of Beau Peep" was published by CreateSpace (ISBN 1463693281) in February 2012.

The strip was dropped from the Daily Star in December 1997, as part of a cost-cutting exercise. This resulted in a huge sales loss for the paper and demands from fans for Beau Peep to be brought back. The strip eventually returned in March 1999, and continued until December 2016, when it was axed for a second time.

Reprints of the strip have been in the Sunday Express, the Sunday Mail, and the Daily Star Sunday. For 15 months from December 1999 new strips were published every week in the Sunday People colour magazine.

In Italy, the strip is called "Beep Peep", published in Lanciostory.

== Characters ==
=== Beau Peep ===
The central character of the strip, Bert Peep, is a short, mustachioed, bespectacled British man who originally fled Britain to escape his terrifying, overbearing and ape-like wife Doris over two decades before the beginning of the strip. Doris followed him, and so Bert joined the French Foreign Legion in the Sahara desert because he believed it was the one place Doris could not reach him. He changed his name to Beau and has been stuck in one fort ever since.

Beau is cowardly, underhanded, incompetent, and inept. His colleagues view Beau as an annoyance, his superiors view him as a loser without hope of promotion, having failed his sergeant's exam no fewer than eighteen times. This Beau puts down to a "slight lack of composure" during moments of stress. On one occasion, when confronted with a difficult question, he ate the exam paper. According to his file, which Beau secretly reads while supposedly cleaning up the sergeant's desk, he is an "utterly brainless idiot" and suffering from "terminal ugliness". Beau does however view himself as a brave, gallant, witty, handsome, intellectual, and cultured individual, and does appear to be cleverer than the majority of people in the fort. When he was young, Beau wanted to be a concert pianist, or a great conductor, and often attempts to escape the confines of his dreary existence by going down to the saloon at the local casbah and getting blind drunk.

=== Dennis Pratt ===
Dennis is the extremely slow-witted best friend of Beau, the only person who has any patience for him, and vice versa. Dennis is a very simple-minded soul, vulgar, and a bit of a womaniser, although he is actually one of the comic's most likeable characters. Being very dense, Dennis has an inability to grasp the simplest of everyday concepts, and is very childlike. He enjoys attempting to do magic tricks, which he is famously bad at. He has a brother named Hector, who is equally dim and visits the fort occasionally, and a sister called Mavis, which is also the name of his first girlfriend. Dennis is rather brave, but this is down to his stupidity rather than nerve. Dennis likes to be read stories before bed, and is apparently aware of his own stupidity. He wishes to be smart like Beau, because he often does not understand what Beau says. (He will often take Beau's words in the dirtiest way possible, causing Beau to put a hand over his mouth and say "Don't be smutty, Dennis.")

=== Doris ===
Beau Peep's estranged wife Doris is never actually seen in the comics, although her speech bubbles are seen in various strips with Doris herself just out of view. Doris is described as very ugly, having many chins, a large frame, an ape-like stance, short legs, and generally terrifying. Her knuckles drag on the floor when she walks. She is madly in love with Beau, and follows him everywhere, even into the desert, although has not found him at the fort yet in the twenty years Beau has been there. Beau is in constant fear of being discovered by Doris, who is the reason why Beau joined the Foreign Legion in the first place. Doris can be aggressive, and she threatens to punch the Nomad many times. The Nomad is, however, perplexingly madly in love with Doris.

=== The Nomad ===
One of the most significant supporting characters of the comic strip, this nomadic Arab lives alone in the desert, and is never named. He was exiled from a local Tuareg tribe for 'nicking' (stealing), and will not be allowed back unless he proves himself by presenting the head of an enemy warrior. For this reason, the Nomad occasionally tries to take over the fort, often failing for stupid reasons, such as forgetting his ladder, forgetting that there is only one of him, or attempting to infiltrate the fort using ridiculous disguises. Beau Peep has outwitted the Nomad on numerous occasions, meaning he has become a mortal enemy of the Nomad. However the Nomad is fond of singing and dancing, and loves sweeties. He still believes that the Earth is flat. He also has the nickname "Bobby Brains, the desert whiz kid". He harbours an unshakable belief that he is a best-selling author waiting to be discovered. His quest for publication began with his autobiography Sand in my Y-fronts. It was rejected by his own mother, as were Sand in my Y-fronts II and Sand in my Y-fronts – The Musical. He also believes he is a talented golfer (he calls himself Tiger Nomad) and has many times tried to be elected as an MP (slogan: "Vote for me or I set the dogs on You").

=== Honest Abdul ===
Honest Abdul is a travelling salesman in the desert and the owner of a merchant caravan selling all manner of goods. He is best known in this strip for selling unremarkable, ordinary and everyday items to the slow-witted Dennis at exorbitant prices by claiming the items to be special. He also cheats the Nomad numerous times, such as selling him a rubber duck which Abdul claimed was an "enemy detector."

=== Sergeant Bidet ===
Described as having a quality that no one else in the comic has – sanity. Bidet has a distinct loathing of the cowardly and useless Beau Peep, whom he regrets ever taking on in the first place and has had to endure for the past twenty years. Bidet has often considered shooting Beau and ending his "nightmare." He often sends Beau out on dangerous and even suicidal missions, which usually causes Beau to break down in tears. When Beau survives by either fleeing from danger or by pure chance, rather than skill or ability, the Sergeant often breaks down in tears himself, due to the fact Beau has survived yet again and Bidet knows he must endure Beau Peep's stupidity forever.

=== Egon ===
Egon is the chef or cook of the fort, and is beyond being described as unhygienic and unclean, as his habits are downright psychotically revolting. Egon is depicted as being covered in filth, constantly having flies buzzing round his head, keeping rats and cockroaches as pets in his kitchen, and keeping his feet warm in dishes such as fish pie and soup which he then feeds to the soldiers. He has an eye-patch covering his right eye. All his recipes have mince as the main ingredient, including the so-called vegetarian ones, and his one great ambition is to open a classy Parisian restaurant called "Monsieur Mince." Egon also appears to be an alcoholic. He loves the drinks cooking sherry and vodka. He also has a bad temper, once holding Beau over the wall of the fort by the ankles because he made a joke about Egon's cooking. Egon does however get on with Beau better than most people in the fort and even sometimes comes to Beau for advice on certain subjects, and to consult Beau on his mediocre cooking skills, which are yet still superior to Egon's.

=== Mad Pierre ===
The fort's resident bully, Pierre is a towering hulk of a man, completely unhinged, and whom nobody will dare call "mad" to his face. Not a man to mess with, he uses violence as a first resort. He once beat up Beau Peep for "using a sentence which contained an uneven number of vowels." Pierre's interests include smacking Beau in the mouth, and cracking his knuckles. Seems to leave Dennis alone, because hitting Beau is too much fun. Beau has come to a compromise with Pierre at times, and has also tried flattery, but this doesn't last long before Beau's face comes back into contact with Pierre's fist.

=== Colonel Escargot ===
The highly eccentric fort commander. His bizarre grip on the real world can be summed up by his belief that "those warmongers of Switzerland" have declared war on him. He is totally unsuitable for the job as he is completely and totally insane, often ordering Beau to perform ridiculously stupid tasks. Is receiving psychiatric help, but as he is oblivious to his insanity (and because he is the CO) he chooses to ignore it. He shot his shrink and falls in love with his tablets, believing them to be small women. The only person the colonel goes easy on is his son, who occasionally visits the fort and gets an easy ride whilst there.

=== Vera of the Seven Veils ===
An exotic belly dancer and stripper at the local saloon, the men at the fort go crazy for her, especially Dennis, who is madly in love with her. Dennis' advances usually end up with him receiving a punch in the mouth, yet still Dennis fantasizes about Vera every day and counts down the days until he can see her again.

=== Hamish ===
A Scottish soldier at the fort, whose accent is so thick nobody can understand him except when they are themselves drunk. Hamish joined the Foreign Legion when his beloved Dundee United F.C. lost a cup-tie to Arbroath F.C. and he could take it no more, and had to get out of Scotland. He often talks of "the wild and rugged Glens" of his homeland – the Glens being the family who lived in the opposite tenement. He has adapted his favourite song, "The Campbells Are Coming", to suit his new environment. Expect to hear "The Camels Are Coming" in a future Eurovision Song Contest where Hamish intends to enter it. He gets on quite well with Beau.

=== Sopwith ===
Beau's camel, named after a famous aeroplane. Sopwith is seemingly intelligent and understands what Beau is saying to him, and Sopwith stubbornly refuses to obey any command given to him. Sopwith will often deliberately throw Beau off his back, or spit in his face whilst Beau is attempting to talk down to the animal. After such acts, Sopwith can often be seen with a smirk on his face.

=== The Vultures ===
A father-son duo where the generation gap has never been wider. The father, a traditionalist, adheres to the vulture anthem, "we eat dead camels and any other mammals". The son is a vegetarian who started a band for punk vultures or "Punctures" for short. Actually the term "generation gap" doesn't do this relationship justice. This is a "generation Grand Canyon".

=== Minor characters ===
Other characters occasionally appear in the strip and include: Astro the Soothsayer, a fortune teller with a tent in the desert. "Headline" Harry, a journalist always looking for a scoop. Sergeant Dirk B. Slaughter, a violent replacement when Sgt Bidet is on leave. Llandudno Jones, an intrepid Welsh explorer.

== See also ==
- Beau Geste
