= Beau Sabreur =

1928 film by John Waters

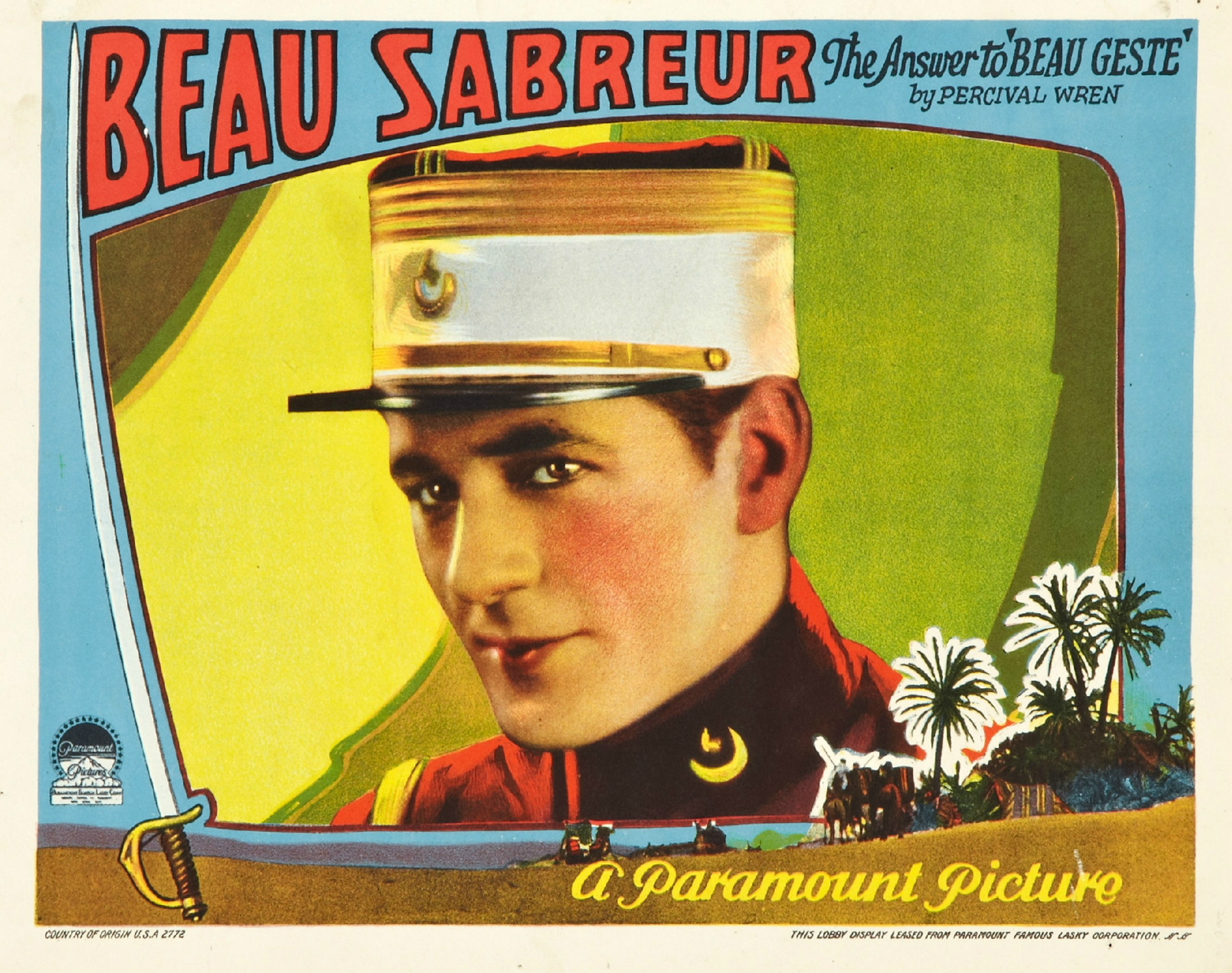
- Lobby card
- Directed by: John Waters
- Written by: Julian Johnson (intertitles)
- Story by: Thomas J. Geraghty
- Based on: Beau Sabreur by P. C. Wren
- Produced by: B. P. Schulberg; Adolph Zukor; Jesse L. Lasky
- Starring: Gary Cooper; Evelyn Brent
- Cinematography: C. Edgar Schoenbaum
- Edited by: Rose Lowenger
- Production company: Paramount Famous Lasky Corporation
- Distributed by: Paramount Pictures
- Release date: January 7, 1928 (USA)
- Running time: 7 reels (6,704 ft)
- Country: United States
- Languages: Silent Version; Sound Version (Synchronized) (English Intertitles)

Beau Sabreur is a 1928 American silent romantic adventure film directed by John Waters and starring Gary Cooper and Evelyn Brent. Due to the public apathy towards silent films, a sound version was also prepared. While the sound version has no audible dialog, it was released with a synchronized musical score with sound effects using both the sound-on-disc and sound-on-film process. Based on the 1926 novel Beau Sabreur by P. C. Wren, who also wrote the 1924 novel Beau Geste. Produced by Paramount Famous Lasky Corporation and distributed by Paramount Pictures, only a trailer exists of this film today. The released feature version is a lost film.

In the original novel the lead character Major Henri de Beaujolais is an officer of spahis (Algerian colonial cavalry of the French Army) and has no connection with the better known Foreign Legion. In all surviving stills of Beau Sabreur Gary Cooper is shown wearing the distinctive spahi uniform and it is not clear whether the lost film was intended to be a Foreign Legion epic.

== Plot ==
A desert-bound member of the French Foreign Legion exposes a betrayer to the Legion. He is then sent on a mission among the Arabs to conclude the signing of a crucial peace treaty.

== Cast ==
- Gary Cooper as Major Henri de Beaujolais
- Evelyn Brent as Mary Vanbrugh
- Noah Beery as Sheikh El Hammel
- William Powell as Becque
- Roscoe Karns as Buddy
- Mitchell Lewis as Suleman the Strong
- Arnold Kent as Raoul de Redon
- Raoul Paoli as Dufour
- Joan Standing as Maudie
- Frank Reicher as General de Beaujolais
- Oscar Smith as Djikki
- H.J. Utterhore (uncredited)
- Alberto Morin (uncredited)

== Music ==
The sound version of the film featured a theme song entitled "Desert Stars" which was composed by Edward Lockton and Frank Tours. A second song, "Thinking of You," by Joseph Grey (words) and Allie Moore (music), was also featured on the soundtrack.

== Production ==
Beau Sabreur was filmed on location in Guadalupe, California, in Red Rock Canyon State Park in Cantil, California, and in Yuma, Arizona.

== Current status ==
Beau Sabreur is a lost film. No prints are known to survive.
