= Amberley, Gloucestershire =

Village in Gloucestershire, England

Coordinates: 51.710°N 2.218°W

Amberley
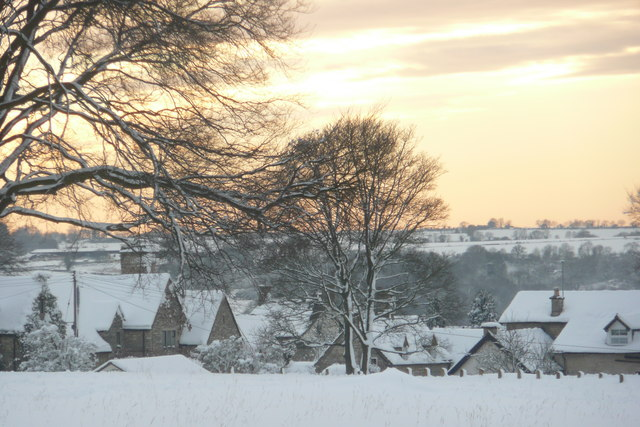
- Amberley in the snow. February 2009

- Location within Gloucestershire
- OS grid reference: SO850012
- District: Stroud
- Shire county: Gloucestershire
- Region: South West
- Country: England
- Sovereign state: United Kingdom
- Post town: Stroud
- Postcode district: GL5
- Dialling code: 01453
- Police: Gloucestershire
- Fire: Gloucestershire
- Ambulance: South Western
- Website: www.amberley.org.uk

Amberley, Gloucestershire is a small village about two miles south of Stroud in Gloucestershire, England. It is situated on the edge of Minchinhampton Common, known for its Golf Club and course. Amberley is as famous for being the venue for the annual Cow hunt, an Amberley parochial school PTA fundraiser. Amberley is also part of the Stroud Five valleys and rolls directly into the Minchinhampton and Rodborough commons known for their open green expanses, Winstones Ice Cream, kites, cows and wild horses.

== Places of interest ==
- War memorial to the soldiers who died in World War II
- Holy Trinity Church, Amberley. The author P C Wren, who wrote Beau Geste, is buried in the churchyard, as is Sir Fabian Ware, founder of the Imperial War Graves Commission.
- The Black Horse Pub
- The Amberley Inn Hotel
- Amberley Parochial School
