= The Legion of Missing Men =

1937 film by Hamilton MacFadden

- Original film poster
- Directed by: Hamilton MacFadden
- Written by: Harry O. Hoyt; Sherman L. Lowe(screenplay); Norman S. Hall(story)
- Starring: Ralph Forbes; Hala Linda
- Cinematography: Marcel Le Picard
- Edited by: Carl Pierson
- Distributed by: Monogram Pictures
- Release date: July 28, 1937
- Running time: 62 min.
- Country: United States
- Language: English

The Legion of Missing Men is a 1937 Monogram Pictures film about the French Foreign Legion set in the French protectorate of Morocco. Directed by Hamilton MacFadden, it stars Ralph Forbes who had also served in the cinematic Foreign Legion in Beau Geste (1926) and Beau Ideal (1931). Singer and actress Hala Linda was married to Richard Gump, the composer of the film's "The Legionnaires Song". It was the only film of Monogram's Marlene Dietrich imitator. The film features scenes reused from a silent film, presumably Under Two Flags.

== Plot ==
Bob Carter is a professional soldier of fortune whose expertise is in the use of the machine gun. He has plied his trade for Sun Yat-Sen in the Xinhai Revolution, the Mexican Revolution and with the Spanish in the Rif War for de Rivera. Now he is content to be a Legionnaire in the 20th Marching Company of the 3rd Foreign Infantry Regiment with his comrades in arms the American Muggsy and the Englishman Bilgey.

Bob's world changes in a variety of ways. First half his company is lost in attacks by Shiek Ibrahim-Ul-Ahmed's insurgents who capture the company's cargo of crated machine guns and ammunition. Fortunately for the Legion, the weapons are disassembled and none of the Shiek's band has the knowledge to get them into working order.

Granted leave in the town of Zabala, Bob is romantically pursued by Nina De Bernay, a French nightclub singer. Nina entertains the Legion but is romantically pursued herself by Bob's Sergeant Garcia; however Bob believes Nina to be his Sergeant's woman and does not pursue her.

Arriving with a draft of replacements for the 20th Company is Bob's own younger brother Don who admires Bob's carefree action packed international lifestyle. Initially upset that Don has thrown away his university education and business potential away, Bob soon resigns himself to his brother's company. Problems arise when Nina, who can not have Bob and doesn't like Sgt Garcia makes a play for Don. Immature and oblivious to local custom and military discipline, Don strikes Sergeant Garcia who gleefully has him arrested and vows to send him to the dreaded Penal Battalion.

Bob breaks the chain of command to appeal directly to his Regimental Commander to avoid ruining Don's life and the Colonel allows Don's release. Unknown to all, Nina uses her friendship with Shiek Ibrahim-Ul-Ahmed to have two of his men free Don and smuggle him to a port where he may leave French North Africa and desert the Legion.

Bob and his two friends Muggsy and Bilgey desert themselves to bring Don back. They track and ambush the party killing one of the Arabs, however the survivor brings reinforcements who capture the Legionnaires. The Shiek initially treats his captives kindly; in order to obtain information. He then uses the opportunity to have Don teach his men how to assemble and use the Hotchkiss M1914 machine guns that they captured from the Legion. This is beyond Don's knowledge but the Shiek knows of Bob's expertise and tortures Don until Bob performs these duties. Bob agrees when Don is released. Bob has his party assemble the weapons but modify all but two of the machine guns by filing the extractors down so they will break after a few rounds are fired and jam the weapons.

Meanwhile Nina arrives and sees that the Shiek has not got Don out of the country and instead plans to wipe out the French. Though trusted by the Shiek, Nina proves herself loyal to France by escaping and warning the Legion of the Shiek's proposed attack on a strategic French fort. The Shiek plans his assault with fire support from the two machine guns manned by the legionnaires who are offered their freedom to switch sides. To ensure their loyalty they are covered by the two other machine guns that Bob has sabotaged.

As the fort is attacked, the four disgraced Legionnaires turn their machine guns on the Shiek and his horde of insurgents.

== Cast ==
- Ralph Forbes ... Bob Carter
- Ben Alexander ... Don Carter
- Hala Linda ... Nina De Bernay
- Roy D'Arcy ... Sheik Ibrahim-Ul-Ahmed
- Paul Hurst ... Muggsy
- Jimmy Aubrey ... Bilgey
- George Regas ... Sgt. Garcia
- Frank Leigh ... Colonel Laurente
