= Beau Hunks =

1931 film by James W. Horne

- Directed by: James W. Horne
- Written by: H.M. Walker
- Produced by: Hal Roach
- Starring: Stan Laurel; Oliver Hardy
- Cinematography: Art Lloyd; Jack Stevens
- Edited by: Richard C. Currier
- Music by: Leroy Shield
- Distributed by: Metro-Goldwyn-Mayer
- Release date: December 12, 1931
- Running time: 36:34
- Country: United States
- Language: English

Beau Hunks is a 1931 American Pre-Code Laurel and Hardy film, directed by James W. Horne.

== Plot ==
Ollie, deeply infatuated with his absent sweetheart Jeanie-Weenie, serenades her with piano melodies before revealing to his friend Stan his plans to marry her. However, their aspirations are swiftly shattered when Ollie receives a letter of rejection from Jeanie-Weenie, prompting him to seek solace in the distraction offered by the French Foreign Legion. Determined to escape the anguish of lost love, the duo enlists in the Legion and embarks on a journey to French Algeria.

Upon their arrival at the Legion barracks, Stan and Ollie are astonished to discover that their fellow soldiers share the same plight, all nursing broken hearts over Jeanie-Weenie. This collective realization leads Ollie to question the worthiness of his affections for Jeanie-Weenie from the outset.

Their attempt to resign from the Legion is met with stern opposition from the camp commander, compelling the entire platoon to embark on a forced march. However, their plans are disrupted when news arrives of an impending siege on Fort Arid by native Riffian tribesmen. Despite becoming separated from their regiment in a sandstorm, Stan and Ollie manage to reach the fortress ahead of their comrades.

In a surprising turn of events, the duo, armed only with barrels of nails, single-handedly repel the Riffian attackers whose bare feet are vulnerable to the nails. The confrontation culminates in the revelation that the leader of the Riffians was also a victim of Jeanie-Weenie's romantic conquests, reinforcing Ollie's newfound perspective on his former love interest.

== Cast ==
- Stan Laurel as Stan
- Oliver Hardy as Ollie
- James W. Horne as the Chief of the Riff Raff
- Charles B. Middleton as the Commandant
- Broderick O'Farrell as Ft. Arid Commander
- Harry Schultz as Captain Schultz
- Billy Bletcher as New Recruit #11
- Charlie Hall as New Recruit #13
- Sam Lufkin as Riffian
- Tiny Sandford as Legion Officer

== Production notes ==
At 37 minutes, Beau Hunks is the longest Laurel and Hardy short. Its premise of the both of them joining the French Foreign Legion in order to help make Ollie forget about a woman who rejected him was reused in their 1939 feature film The Flying Deuces, with Charles B. Middleton again playing their commanding officer.

The title Beau Hunks is a reference to the Beau Geste trilogy (Beau Geste (1924), Beau Sabreur (1926), Beau Ideal (1927)) and its associated Hollywood adaptations, as well as a colloquial ethnic slur prevalent in the United States during the era. The term also alludes to a specific line from Beau Sabreur, where Buddy says '"Sure thing, Son Hank — if a gang of Touareg Bohunks couldn't, French troops couldn't. . . . I s'pose it is us he's after?"

The photograph of "Jeanie-Weenie" is a photo of Jean Harlow, who appeared in three Laurel and Hardy short films before becoming a star.

James Horne, the film's director,did double duty in the role of "Chief OF The Riff Raffs".

== Legacy ==
In January 1992, during an interview on The Tonight Show, Hal Roach identified Beau Hunks as his favorite among the movies he had produced. He cited the cameo appearance of Jean Harlow, a starlet who had transitioned from Roach's studio to MGM. Harlow's presence in the film was confined to archival publicity photographs from her tenure at Roach's studio. Roach's appearance on the show coincided with the celebration of his hundredth birthday.

The film inspired the formation of the Beau Hunks Orchestra, a Dutch musical ensemble established in 1992. Initially assembled to perform soundtrack music at an Oliver Hardy centennial celebration in Amsterdam, the orchestra later expanded its repertoire to include compositions by Leroy Shield and other notable composers, including Raymond Scott. This initiative not only paid homage to the cinematic heritage associated with "Beau Hunks" but also contributed to the preservation and appreciation of film music from the early 20th century.
