= Wren & Martin =

Book

High School English Grammar And Composition
- Author: P. C. Wren; H. Martin
- Cover artist: Wren and Martin
- Language: English
- Subject: English
- Publication date: 1935
- Publication place: British India
- Pages: 376

Wren & Martin refers to a single book High School English Grammar and Composition or collectively, a series of English grammar textbooks written jointly by P. C. Wren and H. Martin. Written primarily for the children of British officers residing in India, these books were widely adopted by Indian and Pakistani schools in the post-colonial era and missionary schools in Burma. The books were published in 1935, with a discussion on composition added later. The content in the books is largely based on The Manual of English Grammar and Composition by J. C. Nesfield.

Other books in this series are Elementary English Grammar, A First Book of English Grammar and Composition, High School English Grammar and Composition and A Final Course of Grammar & Composition. The series of textbooks is still in use at many Indian schools. While semantic change has dated the original books, they continue to enjoy considerable popularity and updated versions are now in common use. Copies of the different versions of this series are available online.
