= The Plainsman (1966 film) =

1966 film

- Theatrical release poster
- Directed by: David Lowell Rich
- Written by: Michael Blankfort
- Produced by: Richard E. Lyons
- Starring: Don Murray; Guy Stockwell
- Cinematography: Bud Thackery
- Edited by: Danny B. Landres; Buddy Small
- Music by: John Williams
- Color process: Pathécolor
- Production company: Universal Pictures
- Distributed by: Universal Pictures
- Release date: August 1966
- Running time: 92 minutes
- Country: United States
- Language: English

The Plainsman is a 1966 American Western film directed by David Lowell Rich and starring Don Murray and Guy Stockwell. It's a remake of the 1936 Cecil B. DeMille film of the same name.

== Plot ==
After being taken prisoner by Crazy Knife and a band of Cheyenne warriors, Wild Bill Hickok's life is spared by Chief Black Kettle, but when he is set free, it is without his horse and his boots.

Calamity Jane, driving a stagecoach, gives Hickok a ride back to the fort, where Lt. Stiles of the Army seems indifferent to Hickok's warning that the Cheyenne are now armed with repeating rifles. At the saloon, where Wild Bill renews an acquaintance with old friend Buffalo Bill, he spots a gambler named Lattimer cheating at poker and deals with him accordingly.

Crazy Knife and his men take Calamity Jane captive, and Lattimer turns out to be the one supplying them with the rifles. Hickok manages to save Jane, who loves him, and the fort ends up with a new officer in command, General Custer.

== Cast ==
- Don Murray as Wild Bill Hickok
- Guy Stockwell as Buffalo Bill Cody
- Abby Dalton as Calamity Jane
- Bradford Dillman as Lieutenant Stiles
- Henry Silva as Crazy Knife
- Simon Oakland as Chief Black Kettle
- Leslie Nielsen as Colonel George Armstrong Custer
- Ed Binns as Lattimer
- Michael Evans as Estrick
- Percy Rodrigues as Brother John
- Terry Wilson as Sergeant Womack
- Walter Burke as Abe Ireland
- Emily Banks as Louisa Cody

== See also ==
- List of American films of 1966
