= Beau Geste (TV series) =

- Genre: Action
- Based on: Beau Geste by P. C. Wren
- Written by: Alistair Bell; Terrance Dicks
- Directed by: Douglas Camfield
- Starring: Benedict Taylor; Anthony Calf; Jonathon Morris; John Forgeham
- Composer: Stephen Deutsch
- Country of origin: United Kingdom
- Original language: English
- No. of series: 1
- No. of episodes: 8

Production
- Producer: Barry Letts
- Production locations: Dorset, England, UK
- Running time: 30 minutes

Original release
- Network: BBC1
- Release: 31 October – 19 December 1982

Beau Geste is a BBC television serial, based on the 1924 novel by P. C. Wren. The series aired on BBC1 from 31 October to 19 December 1982 and starred Benedict Taylor, Anthony Calf and Jonathon Morris as the three brothers.

== Plot ==
Although minor plot points separate the versions, all of the versions share a common element of a stolen gem, which one of the Geste brothers, Beau Geste, is thought to have stolen from his adoptive family. This version, unlike the Hollywood movies, stays true to the book, in that the three young brothers join the French Foreign Legion, are later commanded by Sergeant Major Lejaune (not Markoff, as in one of the Hollywood versions), and this TV adaptation contains the scene from the book where the surrounded legionnaires defiantly sing Le Boudin. The legionnaires' equipment is spot-on too, right down to the correct mess-tins and bayonets. Filmed entirely in England, at various locations, with its desert scenes filmed in a sand pit in Dorset.

== Cast ==
- Benedict Taylor: Michael 'Beau' Geste
- Anthony Calf: Digby Geste
- Jonathon Morris: John Geste
- Andrew Armour: Recruiting Sgt. Major
- Sally Baxter: Isobel
- Lucy Benjamin: Young Claudia (as Lucy Baker)
- Jonathan Burn: Colonna
- John Cannon: Legionnaire
- Nicolas Chagrin: St. Andre
- John Challis: Cpl. Dupre
- Julia Chambers: Claudia
- Les Conrad: Legionnaire
- Robin Crane: Young Digby
- Paul Critchley: Young John
- Barry Dennen: Buddy
- Harry Fielder: Legionnaire
- John Forgeham: Sgt. Maj. Lejaune
- Nadio Fortune: Guantaio
- Pat Gorman: Legionnaire
- Stefan Gryff: Boldini
- Terry Gurry: Corporal
- Paul Hawkins: Young Beau
- Randal Herley: Recruiting Officer
- Andrew Lodge: Glock
- Christopher Malcolm: Hank
- Red Milner: Legionnaire
- John Moreno: Maris
- Kenneth Owens: Brandt
- Daniel André Pageon: Vauren (as Daniel Pageon)
- John Patrick: Rastignac
- Siân Pattenden: Young Isobel
- Maurice Quick: Burdon
- Terry Raven: Indian Gentleman
- Bunny Reed: Schwartz
- Christopher Reilly: Young Augustus
- John Repsch: Corporal
- Jon Rumney: Bolidar
- David Shawyer: Sgt. Maj. Dufour
- Philip Shelley: Augustus Brandon
- Barry Summerford: Legionnaire
- David Sumner: Maj. Henri de Beaujolais
- Damien Thomas: Capt. Renouf
- Robert Vowles: Guard Corporal
- Wendy Williams: Lady Brandon
