= Beau Geste (1939 film) =

1939 film by William A. Wellman

- Original theatrical poster
- Directed by: William A. Wellman
- Screenplay by: Robert Carson
- Based on: Beau Geste; 1924 novel by P. C. Wren
- Produced by: William A. Wellman
- Starring: Gary Cooper; Ray Milland; Robert Preston; Brian Donlevy; Susan Hayward
- Cinematography: Theodor Sparkuhl; Archie Stout
- Edited by: Thomas Scott
- Music by: Alfred Newman
- Color process: Black and white
- Production company: Paramount Pictures
- Distributed by: Paramount Pictures
- Release date: July 24, 1939
- Running time: 112 minutes
- Country: United States
- Language: English

Beau Geste is a 1939 American adventure film starring Gary Cooper, Ray Milland, Robert Preston, Brian Donlevy, and Susan Hayward. Directed and produced by William A. Wellman, the screenplay was adapted by Robert Carson, based on the 1924 novel of the same title by P. C. Wren. The music score was by Alfred Newman and cinematography was by Theodor Sparkuhl and Archie Stout.

== Plot ==
French Foreign Legionnaires approach an isolated fort in the desert. The French flag is flying, but a closer inspection reveals only dead men propped up behind the parapets. However, a pair of shots is fired from inside, so the bugler volunteers to scale the wall to investigate. After waiting a while, the commander follows. The bugler has vanished, and the commander finds two bodies that are not staged like the rest and a note on one confessing to the theft of a valuable sapphire called the "Blue Water". After the officer rejoins his men outside, the fort goes up in flames.

Fifteen years earlier, Lady Brandon, wife of absent spendthrift Sir Hector Brandon, takes care of the three adopted Geste brothers, "Beau", Digby, and John; her ward Isobel Rivers; and heir Augustus Brandon. Years pass, and the children become young adults. They learn that Sir Hector intends to sell the "Blue Water", leaving nothing of value for Lady Brandon. At Beau's request, the gem is brought out for one last look when suddenly the lights go out and it is stolen. All present proclaim their innocence, but first Beau and then Digby depart without warning, each leaving a confession that he committed the robbery. John reluctantly parts from his beloved Isobel and goes after his brothers.

John discovers that they have joined the French Foreign Legion, so he enlists as well. They are trained by the sadistic Sergeant Markoff. Legionnaire Rasinoff, a former thief, overhears joking remarks by the Geste brothers, leading him and Markoff to believe that Beau has the gem.

Markoff separates the brothers. Beau and John are assigned to a detachment sent to man isolated Fort Zinderneuf. When Lieutenant Martin dies from a fever, Markoff assumes command. Fearing the sergeant's now-unchecked brutality, Schwartz incites the other men to mutiny the next morning; only Beau, John, and Maris refuse to take part. However, Markoff is tipped off by Voisin and disarms the would-be mutineers while they are sleeping. The next morning, Markoff orders Beau and John to execute the ringleaders, but they refuse.

Before Markoff can react, the fort is attacked by Tuaregs, forcing him to rearm his men. The initial assault is beaten off, but each new attack takes its toll. Markoff props up the corpses at their posts to deceive the enemy. The final assault is repulsed, but Beau is shot, leaving Markoff and John the only men left standing.

Markoff sends John to get bread and wine. He then searches Beau and finds a small pouch and two letters. When John sees what Markoff has done, he draws his bayonet, giving Markoff the excuse to shoot the only witness to his theft. However, Beau is not yet dead and manages to spoil Markoff's aim, allowing John to stab him. John and Beau hear a bugle announcing the arrival of reinforcements, Digby among them. Beau dies in his brother's arms after telling him to take one of the letters to Lady Brandon and leave the other, a confession of the robbery, in Markoff's hand. John escapes unseen.

Digby volunteers to find out why there is no response from the fort. He discovers Beau's body and, remembering his childhood wish, gives him a Viking funeral. He places Beau on a cot, with a "dog" (Markoff) at his feet, and sets fire to the barracks. Then he too deserts. He finds John outside the fort. Later, they encounter two American Legionnaire friends and begin the long journey home. Desperate for water, they find an oasis, but it is occupied by Arabs. Digby tricks them into fleeing by sounding a bugle to signal a charge by non-existent Legionnaires, but is killed by a parting shot.

John returns home and reunites with Isobel. Lady Brandon reads aloud Beau's letter, which reveals that as a child he was hiding in a suit of armor and witnessed her selling the "Blue Water". Realizing years later she had replaced it with a fake, he had stolen the faux gem to protect her from being found out — his beau geste.

== Cast ==
- Gary Cooper as Michael "Beau" Geste
- Ray Milland as John Geste
- Robert Preston as Digby Geste
- Brian Donlevy as Sergeant Markoff
- Susan Hayward as Isobel Rivers
- J. Carrol Naish as Rasinoff
- Albert Dekker as Schwartz
- Broderick Crawford as Hank Miller
- Charles Barton as Buddy McMonigal
- James Stephenson as Major Henri de Beaujolais, commander of the relief column
- Heather Thatcher as Lady Patricia Brandon
- James Burke as Lieutenant Dufour
- G. P. Huntley Jr. as Augustus Brandon
- Harold Huber as Voisin
- Donald O'Connor as Beau as a child
- Billy Cook as John as a child
- Martin Spellman as Digby as a child
- Ann Gillis as Isobel as a child
- David Holt as Augustus as a child, a despised playmate
- Harvey Stephens as Lieutenant Martin
- Stanley Andrews as Maris
- Harry Woods as Renoir, a Legionnaire deserter
- Arthur Aylesworth as Renault, another deserter
- Henry Brandon as Renouf
- Barry Macollum as Krenke
- Ronald R. Rondell as Bugler

== Production ==
The film is a virtual scene-for-scene remake of the 1926 silent version of the same title starring Ronald Colman.

It was filmed either near Yuma, Arizona, at the same location as its predecessor; or on government-owned land in California's Imperial Valley.

== Release ==
The film was banned in parts of Canada out of respect for the French government. The film was banned by the fascist authorities in Mussolini's Italy on the grounds that it portrayed the British too positively, and it was feared that because Britain was a democracy the film would correspondingly serve to undermine fascist ideology. The 1935 movie The Lives of a Bengal Lancer, also starring Gary Cooper, had been banned in Mussolini's Italy for the same reason.

The film's copyright was renewed in 1966.

== Reception ==
A contemporary New York Times reviewer felt that this film did not come up to the standards of the Ronald Colman 1926 adaptation, writing that, "On the whole, it is perhaps an unfortunate thing for Beau Geste the Second that Beau Geste the First was so distinguished, for Mr. Wellman's film seems dominated by the tremendous shadow of its predecessor." One of the complaints was that the three British Geste brothers were all played by Americans. Nevertheless, the reviewer still called the production "a stirring piece of cinema".

Beau Geste currently holds a 92% approval rating on Rotten Tomatoes.

=== Award nominations ===
Brian Donlevy was nominated for the Academy Award for Best Supporting Actor for his role in the film.
