= Rodolfo Landa =

Mexican actor and lawyer

Francisco Luis Rodolfo Echeverría Álvarez, better known as Rodolfo Landa (September 24, 1926 – February 14, 2004), was a Mexican actor, lawyer, public official and trade unionist. He served as a leader of the National Actors Association (ANDA) and the Mexican Theater Center of ITI-UNESCO, in addition to developing a theatrical career for which he won critical and public recognition. He was the brother of Luis Echeverría Álvarez, president of Mexico from 1970 to 1976.

Echeverría Álvarez also served in the Chamber of Deputies on two occasions: from 1952 to 1955, representing the Federal District's 18th electoral district, and from 1961 to 1964, representing the Federal District's 6th electoral district.

== Selected filmography ==
- Beau Ideal (1948)
- Red Rain (1950)

Trade union offices
Preceded by Fernand Gravey	President of the International Federation of Actors; 1962–1967	Succeeded by Vlastimil Fisar
