= Beau Sabreur (novel) =

1926 novel by P. C. Wren

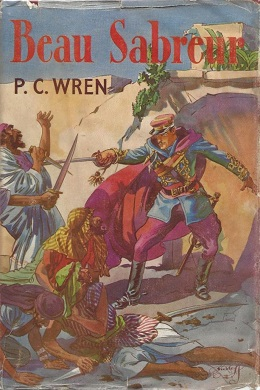
- First edition
- Author: P. C. Wren
- Language: English
- Publisher: John Murray
- Publication date: 1926
- Publication place: United Kingdom
- Preceded by: Beau Geste
- Followed by: Beau Ideal

Beau Sabreur is a 1926 novel by P. C. Wren. It was the first sequel to his 1924 novel Beau Geste and was turned into a film in 1928.

== Plot ==
It focuses on the adventures of Major Henri de Beaujolais from adolescence to maturity as a well-connected cavalry officer in the French Army: he's an Old Etonian; his mother a Devonshire Cary; his deceased father a Frenchman; his paternal uncle the youngest General in the French Army and married to the sister of the French Minister of State for War. Starting as a one-year volunteer trooper in a hussar regiment, De Beaujolais graduates from the Saumur Cavalry School to become an officer of Spahis and a member of the French Secret Service. He appears in Wren's Beau Geste, commanding the relief column which reaches the besieged Fort Zinderneuf.

== Themes ==
It can be said that it is the French novel of the trilogy (or known as a trilogy if one takes no account of the books Good Gestes and Spanish Maine) as Beau Geste is the English one, and Beau Ideal the American one. The plot presents the dichotomy between love of country (duty) and the love of a woman (passion).

The New York Times complained about the "preposterous plot and inconceivable characters."

The original title was Who Rideth Alone.
