= Beau Ideal =

1931 film by Herbert Brenon

- Theatrical poster
- Directed by: Herbert Brenon; Ray Lissner (assistant)
- Written by: Paul Schofield (screenplay); Elizabeth Meehan (adaptation); Marie Halvey (dialogue)
- Based on: Beau Ideal by: P. C. Wren
- Produced by: Herbert Brenon
- Starring: Ralph Forbes; Loretta Young; Irene Rich; Lester Vail
- Cinematography: J. Roy Hunt
- Edited by: Herbert Brenon
- Music by: Max Steiner
- Production company: RKO Radio Pictures
- Distributed by: RKO Radio Pictures
- Release dates: January 16, 1931 (Premiere-New York City); January 25, 1931 (US)
- Running time: 82 minutes 79 minutes (Canada, Ontario)
- Country: United States
- Language: English
- Budget: $707,000
- Box office: $575,000

Beau Ideal is a 1931 American pre-Code adventure film directed by Herbert Brenon and released by RKO Radio Pictures. The film was based on the 1927 adventure novel Beau Ideal by P. C. Wren, the third novel in a series of five novels based around the same characters. Brenon had directed the first in the series, Beau Geste, which was a very successful silent film in 1926. The screenplay was adapted from Wren's novel by Paul Schofield, who had also written the screenplay for the 1926 Beau Geste, with contributions from Elizabeth Meehan and Marie Halvey.

The film starred Ralph Forbes (reprising his role as John Geste from the 1926 Beau Geste), Loretta Young, and Irene Rich. The other lead, Lester Vail, was making his film debut, after he replaced Douglas Fairbanks, Jr., who had originally been selected for a principal role in the film. Exteriors were filmed on locations in Arizona and Mexico, while the interiors were filmed on the RKO lot in Hollywood, and production took approximately five weeks to film. Post production would take place in November and December 1930, before the film was released on January 16, 1931.

Unfortunately, the film was neither a critical nor financial success, losing over $300,000 for RKO. In addition, reviews for the film were mixed, with most being not kind to the film. Some modern sources also consider the film to be one of the worst produced by RKO that year. Although the film was not a success, it did introduce two technological advancements to film: the concentrator microphone and the Dunning process.

== Plot ==
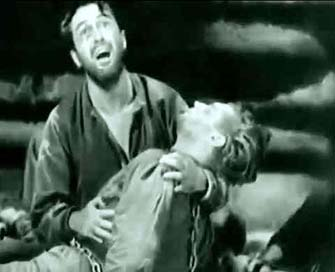
Lester Vail and Ralph Forbes awaiting death in the prison pit

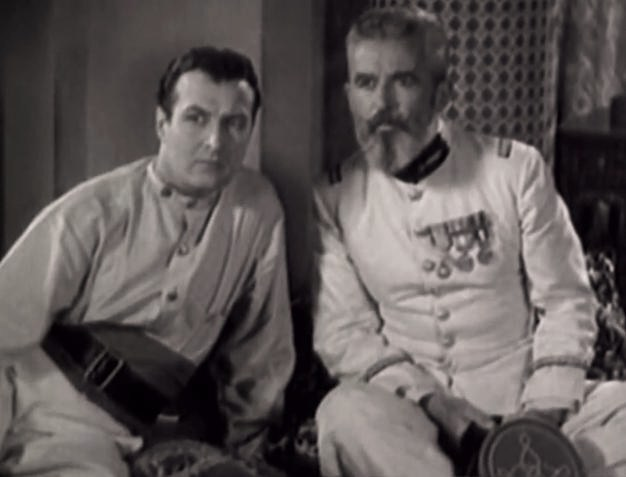
Lester Vail & Paul McAllister

The last two surviving members of a French Foreign Legion detachment, who know each other as Smith and Brown, are consigned to a grain pit in the desert to die slowly. As they await death the two soldiers eventually realize that they were childhood friends, John Geste (Ralph Forbes) and Otis Madison (Lester Vail), respectively.

Once they recognize one another, they have a series of flashbacks to their boyhood friendship in England. These memories are followed by Otis' memory of his return to England and discovery that John has joined the French Foreign Legion. While in England, Otis also learns that Isobel Landon (Loretta Young), who he is enamored with, is betrothed to John. Despite his feelings for her, he vows to follow John to Africa and return him to England. He makes arrangements and leaves for the dark continent.

Upon his arrival in Africa, Otis, and his detachment, are ordered to garrison a French fort in the desert. As hardships ensue, his fellow legionnaires begin to mutiny. Otis does not participate in the uprising, instead he attempts to get the other soldiers to cease their rebellion. When the uprising is eventually thwarted, the commanders do not believe Otis' story, and assume that he was part of the rebellion, and send him to a penal detail. While part of that detail, he is again falsely accused, and is thrown into the pit, along with John, which puts them both in the pit where the film begins.

Back in the present, as they are about to die, they are miraculously rescued by a passing band of Arabs. Unknown to the two friends is that the Arabs intend to use them as bait to draw their fellow legionnaires into a death trap. Fortunately for the friends, the girlfriend of the Emir, Zuleika (Leni Stengel), also known as "the Angel of Death", is attracted to Otis. Otis uses that attraction and agrees to marry her, after which Zuleika informs him of an impending attack by the Arabs on the nearby fort, and then helps Otis and John to escape. The two legionnaires race to the fort, and help to repel the Arab attack, which earns both of them their freedom.

Otis now has to face up to his commitment to Zuleika. However, she has now transferred her affections to Major LeBaudy (Hale Hamilton), which allows Otis to be relieved of his matrimonial duties. Free from any entanglements, the two friends return to England. Once there, John releases Isobel from their betrothal, which clears the way for her and Otis to marry.

== Cast ==
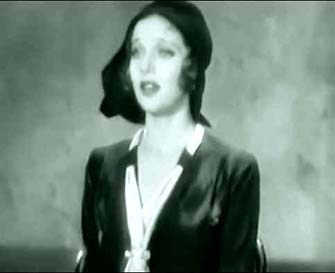
Loretta Young at Forbes' court-martial

Leni Stengel as Zuleika

- Frank McCormack as Carl Neyer
- Ralph Forbes as John Geste
- Lester Vail as Otis Madison
- Otto Matieson as Jacob Levine
- Don Alvarado as Ramon Gonzales
- Bernard Siegel as Ivan Badineff
- Irene Rich as Lady Brandon
- Myrtle Stedman as Mrs. Frank Madison
- Loretta Young as Isobel Brandon
- John St. Polis as Judge Advocate
- Joseph De Stefani as Prosecuting Attorney
- Paul McAllister as Sergeant Frederic
- Hale Hamilton as Major Laboudy
- George Regas as The Emir
- Leni Stengel as Zuleika - the "Angel of Death"

(Cast list as per AFI database)

== Production ==
The precursor to Paramount Pictures, Famous Players–Lasky Corp, produced the film Beau Geste, in 1926. It was based on P. C. Wren's novel of life in the French Foreign Legion. The second book in the series, Beau Sabreur, was made into a film in 1928, starring Gary Cooper, also by Paramount. While Beau Sabreur was unconnected to Beau Geste, having completely different characters, this third film was billed as the sequel to the first film, having many of the same characters. Like the other two films, this movie was based on the Wren novel of the same name, which had been released in 1928. RKO purchased the rights to the novel in July 1930, and Herbert Brenon, who had directed Beau Geste, became the first person attached to the project.

In August it was announced that Ralph Forbes would reprise his role of John Geste, which he had originated in the original film.

In the beginning of September it was announced that Douglas Fairbanks, Jr. would have a leading role in the film, on loan from Warner Brothers; also announced to the cast were Ralph Forbes and Leni Stengel. In September 1930, RKO hired an Arab chieftain, Abdeslam ben Mohammed, as a technical consultant for the film. Initial reports also indicated that he would appear in the film, but no sources credit him with appearing. By mid-September, however, Fairbanks, originally scheduled to play the role of Otis Madison, was recalled by Warner Brothers prior to the start of filming, so that he could star in a scheduled sequel to The Dawn Patrol (which was never made). He was replaced by Lester Vail, who was making his screen debut. Vail had a very short-lived career, making a total of only eight films in 1931 and 1932.

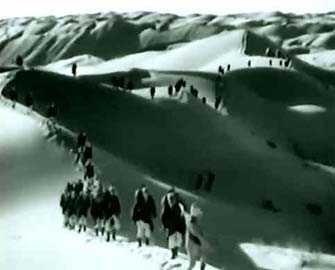
French Foreign Legion marching through the desert

Also in September, it was decided that the film would use the same location as the earlier Geste film, in Yuma, Arizona. Besides the Yuma location, some location filming was done in the Sonora Desert in Mexico, as well as studio work on the RKO lot in Hollywood. Later in September, Otto Matieson, Paul McAllister, Hale Hamilton, and Don Alvarado were announced as joining the cast. Ray Lissner, who was the assistant director on this picture, also wrote the only song in the film, the marching song of the French Foreign Legion, however it appears the song did not appear in the final version of the film. In late September it was announced that Noah Beery, Jr. would be part of the cast, interesting in the fact that his father had been part of the cast of Beau Geste

Production on the film began in late September 1930, and would finish in late October. Two new technological improvements were inaugurated in this film. The "Dunning Process" was used to adapt the film for foreign-language versions. The concentrator microphone was developed by RKO to be used in productions to filter noise in exterior shots, was first used during this film's production. In addition to Brenon directing and Schofield writing both films, J. Roy Hunt was the cinematographer on both the 1926 Beau Geste and this film. Editing for the film was done during November and December 1930 by Brenon. Max Steiner would finish the score for the film by December 22, 1930.

== Reception ==
Beau Ideal was produced on a budget of $707,000, however the film never caught on with audiences, and ended up losing $330,000 for RKO, in a year when the studio would lose over $5.5 million. While an unmitigated financial disaster, reviews of the film at that time were mixed. Mordaunt Hall, film critic for The New York Times, gave the film a poor review, calling it "...scarcely a tribute to the audible screen". According to some sources, the film was considered "...the most wretched picture turned out by the studio in what was, generally, to be a very poor year." Variety also gave it a less than favorable review, calling it "ordinary program stuff." However other reviews were much more favorable, with The Film Daily calling it a "Stupendous Foreign Legion production with stout direction and excellent photography". They criticized the story as weak, but also praised the acting of the mostly male cast, and singled out Loretta Young's strong performance. And Photoplay magazine called the a "spectacular sequel to Beau Geste, and complimented the acting.

== Status ==
The film was copyrighted in 1930. In 1958, the film entered the public domain in the United States because the claimants did not renew its copyright registration in the 28th year after publication.

== See also ==
- List of films in the public domain in the United States
