= Joseph De Stefani =

American actor (1879–1940)

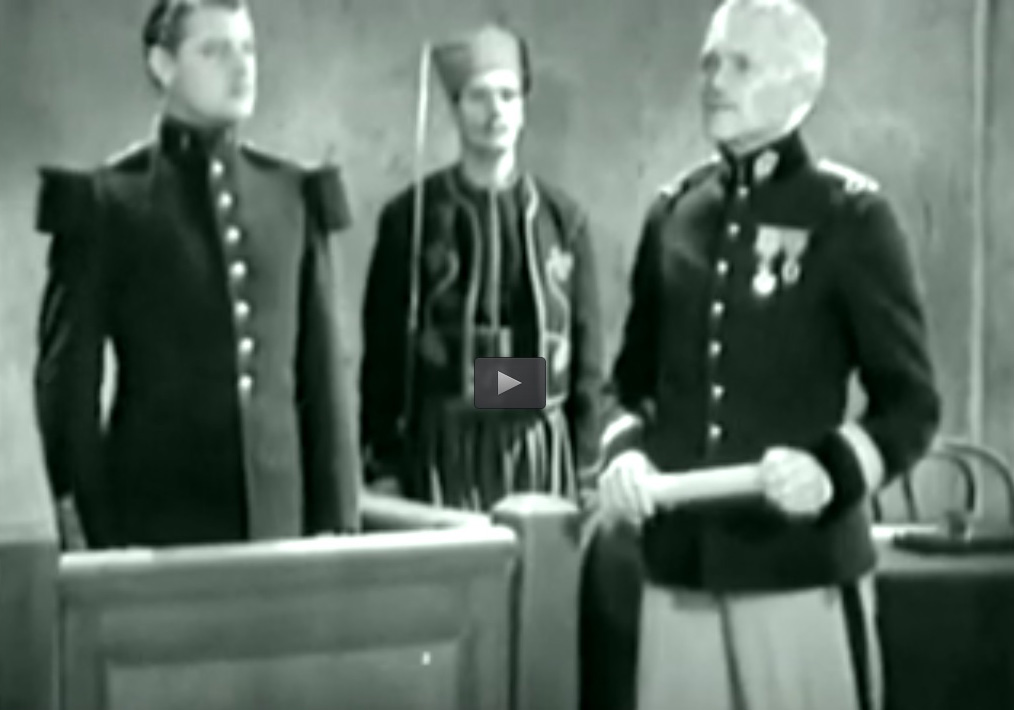
- De Stefani in Beau Ideal (1931) on the right
- Born: October 3, 1879; Venice, Italy
- Died: October 26, 1940 (aged 61); Los Angeles, California, U.S.
- Occupation: Actor
- Years active: 1931–1940
- Spouse: Helen De Stefani (nee Keers) (? - 1938, her death)

Joseph De Stefani (October 3, 1879 – October 26, 1940) was an American character actor of the early sound era. Born in Venice, Italy, he began his film career in the 1931 movie, Beau Ideal. He appeared in 25 films over the next decade, his final appearance would be in a small role in 1940's A Dispatch from Reuters, which stars Edward G. Robinson.

De Stefani was married to light-opera prima donna Helen Keers until her death in 1938. De Stefani died on October 26, 1940, exactly one week after the release of A Dispatch from Reuters. He is buried in Forest Lawn Memorial Park in Glendale, California.

== Filmography ==
(as per AFI's database)

Year	Title	Role	Notes
1931	Beau Ideal	Prosecuting attorney	
1935	Les Misérables	Usher in Arras courtroom/Old clerk in Arras	
1935	The Man Who Broke the Bank at Monte Carlo	Waiter	
1935	Under Pressure	Head waiter	
1935	Grand Exit	Porter	
1937	Thin Ice	Innkeeper	
1937	The Toast of New York	Head waiter	
1937	Exclusive	Foreman	
1937	Seventh Heaven		
1938	Gateway	Immigrant	
1938	Adventure in Sahara	Edis	
1938	I Am the Law	Cigar store proprietor	
1938	Squadron of Honor	Mr. Gobel	
1939	Twelve Crowded Hours	Rovitch	
1939	Let Us Live	Dentist juror	
1939	Everything Happens at Night	Norden servant	
1939	Blackwell's Island		
1939	The Man They Could Not Hang	Dr. Stoddard	
1939	The Three Musketeers	Monk	
1939	Thunder Afloat	Fisherman	
1940	Sky Bandits	Professor Lewis	
1940	Rancho Grande	Jose	
1940	A Dispatch from Reuters	Assistant	
1940	Babies for Sale	Dr. John Gaines	
1940	British Intelligence	German officer	
