= De Stefanis =

De Stefanis is an Italian surname. Notable people with the surname include:

- Giovanni De Stefanis (1915–2006), Italian racing cyclist
- Giuseppe De Stefanis (1885–1965), Italian general during World War II

== See also ==
- Nancy DeStefanis, American environmental educator, field ornithologist and lecturer
