= Beau Geste =

1924 adventure novel by P. C. Wren

- Author: P. C. Wren
- Genre: Novel
- Publisher: John Murray
- Publication date: 1924
- Media type: Print
- Followed by: Beau Sabreur

Beau Geste is an adventure novel by British writer P. C. Wren, which details the adventures of three English brothers who enlist separately in the French Foreign Legion following the theft of a valuable jewel from the country house of a relative. Published in 1924, the novel is set in the period before World War I. It has been adapted for the screen several times.

== Plot summary ==
Michael "Beau" Geste is the protagonist. The main narrator is his younger brother John. The three Geste brothers are portrayed as behaving according to the English upper-class values of a time gone by. The Geste siblings are orphans and have been brought up by their aunt Lady Patricia at Brandon Abbas. The rest of Beau's band are mainly Isobel and Claudia (possibly the illegitimate daughter of Lady Patricia) and Lady Patricia's relative Augustus (the caddish nephew of the absent Sir Hector Brandon). While not mentioned in Beau Geste, the American Otis Vanbrugh appears as a friend of the Geste brothers in a sequel novel. John and Isobel are devoted to each other, and it is in part to spare her any suspicion of being a thief that he takes the extreme step of joining the French Foreign Legion (following in the steps of his elder brothers).

The inciting incident is the disappearance of a precious jewel known as the "Blue Water". Suspicion falls on the band of young people, and Beau leaves England to join the French Foreign Legion in Algeria, followed by his brothers, Digby (his twin) and John. After recruit training in Sidi Bel Abbes and some active service skirmishing with tribesmen in the south, Beau and John are posted to the small garrison of the fictional desert outpost of Fort Zinderneuf, while Digby and his American friends Hank and Buddy are sent to Tanout-Azzal to train with a mule mounted company. The commander at Fort Zinderneuf (after the death of two more senior officers) is the sadistic Sergeant Major Lejaune, who drives his abused subordinates to the verge of mutiny. An attack by Tuaregs prevents mutiny and mass desertion (only the Geste brothers and a few loyalists are against the plot). Throughout the book, Beau's behaviour is true to France and the Legion, and he dies at his post. Digby, Hank and Buddy arrive with a relief column from Tokotu that reaches Fort Zinderneuf too late. Together with John (the last man left standing at Zinderneuf) they desert and experience a long trek during which Digby is killed in a skirmish with Arabs.

After becoming separated from his friends Hank and Buddy in the desert, John returns to Brandon Abbas. The last survivor of the three brothers, he is welcomed by their aunt and his fiancée Isobel. In a letter from Beau delivered by John to Aunt Patricia, the reason for the jewel theft is revealed to have been to prevent Aunt Patricia's exposure for having secretly sold the jewel to enable her to extend relief to Sir Hector's exploited tenants.

In Beau Ideal and other sequels P. C. Wren ties loose strings together, including recording that Michael Geste's original reasons for joining the Foreign Legion were not only honour but also his doomed and impossible love for Claudia. The French officer of Spahis Major de Beaujolais, who commands the relief column at Fort Zinderneuf, is the narrator of Wren's subsequent novel Beau Sabreur.

== Title ==
The phrase "beau geste" (pronounced [bo ʒɛst]) is from the French, meaning "a gracious (or fine) gesture". However, several references in the novel allude to the fact that the name can be taken to mean 'joke', or 'humorous remark' which suggest that it is pronounced like English 'jest'.

In French, the phrase includes the suggestion of a fine gesture with unwelcome or futile consequences, and an allusion to the chanson de geste, a literary poem celebrating the legendary deeds of a hero.

== Sequels ==
P. C. Wren wrote the sequels Beau Sabreur (1926) (in which the narrator is a French officer of Spahis who plays a secondary role in Beau Geste) and Beau Ideal (1927). In this third volume Wren details what happened the night of the theft of the Blue Water. He also wrote Good Gestes, a collection of short tales (about half of them about the Geste brothers and their American friends Hank and Buddy, who also feature prominently in Beau Sabreur and Beau Ideal) and Spanish Maine (UK) (The Desert Heritage (US)), where loose ends are tied up and the successive tales of John Geste's adventures come to an end. Life in the Foreign Legion is also represented in some, but not all, of Wren's subsequent novels: Port O'Missing Men, Soldiers of Misfortune, Valiant Dust, Dead Men's Boots, Flawed Blades (which includes also two short tales of the Geste brothers in the Legion pre-Zinderneuf), The Wages of Virtue, Stepsons of France, and The Uniform of Glory.

== Analysis ==
The original novel, on which the various films are more or less loosely based, provides a detailed and fairly authentic description of life in the pre-1914 Foreign Legion, which has led to (unproven) suggestions that P. C. Wren himself served with the Legion. Before he became a successful writer Wren's recorded career was that of a school teacher in India.

== Adaptations for film, radio and theatre ==
=== Film ===
- Beau Geste 1926 - starring Ronald Colman, William Powell and Noah Beery Sr.
- Beau Geste 1939 - starring Gary Cooper, Ray Milland and Robert Preston
- Beau Geste 1966 - starring Guy Stockwell, Doug McClure and Telly Savalas

=== Radio ===
- Beau Geste. 1939 radio serial from The Campbell Playhouse starring Orson Welles and Laurence Olivier.
- Beau Geste. 1947 radio series from BBC Radio broadcast in 10 parts and starring Barry Morse and Kenneth Morgan.
- Beau Geste. 1958 radio series from BBC Radio broadcast in 10 parts and starring Simon Lack and David Spenser. Subsequently rebroadcast on BBC Home Service.
- Beau Geste. 1994 radio series from BBC Radio broadcast in 6 parts and starring David Lumsden and Michael Lumsden. Subsequently rebroadcast on Radio 4 Extra in 2022.
- Classic Serial: Beau Geste. 2009 radio series from BBC Radio broadcast in 2 parts and starring Chris New and Rob Hastle.

=== Television ===
- Beau Geste. 1982 television series from BBC TV starring Benedict Taylor, Anthony Calf and Jonathon Morris.

=== Stage ===
Beau Geste was also adapted for the stage in 1929 by British theatrical producer Basil Dean. The production featured Laurence Olivier in the lead role and fellow actors included Madeleine Carroll and Jack Hawkins. The play ran for just five weeks.

== Parodies ==
- Beau Hunks 1931, a 1931 movie starring Laurel and Hardy.
- The Flying Deuces 1939, partial remake of the above, starring Laurel and Hardy, also known as The Flying Aces.
- The Goon Show episode "Under Two Floorboards (A Story of the Legion)" (broadcast 25 January 1955)
- "The Tiddlywink Warriors" in Earthman's Burden (1957) by Poul Anderson and Gordon R. Dickson published by Gnome Press (with multiple reprints over the years
- Follow that Camel (1967) A Carry on film featuring a character called B. O. West.
- The Last Remake of Beau Geste (1977), starring Marty Feldman, Ann-Margret and Michael York
- Beau Peep (started 1978) a strip cartoon in the Daily Star newspaper.
- By Balloon to the Sahara, by Douglas Terman, includes an ending where the protagonist befriends "Captain Best" of the "Famed Foreign Legion" and later writes a novel entitled Go Best in tribute to him.
- In Soul Music (1994), by Terry Pratchett. The Death of the Discworld uses the name Beau Nidle and joins the Klatchian Foreign Legion, a parody of the French Foreign Legion, in an attempt to learn how to forget.
- The comic strip Crock claims to be "the greatest and longest-running parody" of Beau Geste, although it bears little similarity to the original novel.
- Snoopy from the Peanuts comic strip frequently refers to Fort Zinderneuf when roleplaying as a Foreign Legionnaire.

== Sources ==
- Thomas, R. S. (1990–12). "P C Wren's Beau Geste". Children's Literature in Education, vol. 21, no. 4, December 1990.
- Coleman, Terry (2005). Olivier. Macmillan. ISBN 0-8050-7536-4.
- Tibbetts, John C., and James M. Welsh, eds. The Encyclopedia of Novels Into Film (2nd ed. 2005) pp 24–26.
