= Douglas Heyes =

American film producer

Douglas Heyes (May 22, 1919 – February 8, 1993) was an American film and television writer, director, producer, actor, composer, and author with a long list of accomplishments. He was sometimes credited under the pseudonym Matthew Howard.

== Personal life and death ==
He was the father of actor Douglas Heyes Jr.

He died in Beverly Hills, California on February 8, 1993.

== Bibliography ==
- Heyes, Douglas (1951). The Kiss-Off (An Inner Sanctum Mystery) (First ed.). Simon & Schuster. ASIN B0006ASRYU.
- Heyes, Douglas (1963). The 12th of Never (First ed.). Random House. ASIN B0006AYOZ6.
- Heyes, Douglas (1985). The Kill (First ed.). Ballantine Books. ISBN 978-0345325013., Shamus Award Nominee for Best Original PI Paperback (1986)

== Filmography (selected) ==
=== As actor ===
- Aspen – 1977 TV miniseries (uncredited)
  - also known as The Innocent and the Damned – USA rerun title
- The Twilight Zone – 1959 series
  - The Invaders – Invader voice (only speaking character in whole episode)
  - "Dust" S2 E12 - Rogers, who brings his children to witness a hanging, but who instead witness a scene of forgiveness.

=== As composer ===
- Colt .45 – 1957 TV series theme music

=== As director ===
- The Highwayman – 1987 TV movie
  - also known as Terror on the Blacktop
- Magnum, P.I. – 1980 TV series
- The French Atlantic Affair – 1979 TV series
- Captains and the Kings – 1976 TV miniseries
- City of Angels – 1976 TV series
- Baretta – 1975 TV series
- "Powderkeg" – (1971 TV film and pilot for the series Bearcats!)
- Night Gallery – 1970 TV series
- McCloud – 1970 TV series
- Beau Geste – 1966 film
- Kitten with a Whip - 1964 film
- Kraft Suspense Theatre – 1963 TV series (episode "The Trains of Silence")
- The Virginian – 1962 TV series
- Thriller (TV series) - 1960-1962
- The Twilight Zone – 1959 TV series (9 episodes)
- 77 Sunset Strip – 1958 TV series
- Naked City – 1958 TV series
- Maverick – 1957 TV series
- The Adventures of Rin Tin Tin – 1954 TV series

=== As producer ===
- Barbary Coast – 1975 TV series
- Barbary Coast – 1975 TV film
- Honky Tonk – 1974 TV film (executive producer)
- Bearcats! – 1971 TV series (executive producer)
- Powderkeg – 1971 TV film and pilot for the series Bearcats!
- The Bravo Duke – 1965 TV film

=== As writer ===
- North and South (novel) – 1985 TV miniseries
- The French Atlantic Affair – 1979 TV series
- Captains and the Kings – 1976 TV miniseries
- City of Angels – 1976 TV series
- Get Christie Love! – 1975 TV series - episode "I'm Your New Neighbor" (as Matthew Howard)
- Powderkeg – 1971 TV film and pilot for the series Bearcats!
- The Groundstar Conspiracy – 1972 film (as Matthew Howard)
- Alias Smith and Jones – 1971 TV series (as Matthew Howard)
- Night Gallery episodes – 1970
  - "Brenda"
  - "The Dead Man"
  - "The Housekeeper"
- McCloud – 1970 TV series
- Ice Station Zebra – 1968 film
- Beau Geste – 1966 film
- "The 12th of Never" – 1963 novel
- The Virginian – 1962 TV series
- Thriller TV series – 1961 – episode "The Hungry Glass"
- 77 Sunset Strip – 1958 TV series
- Maverick – 1957 TV series
- The Adventures of Rin Tin Tin – 1954 TV series
- "The Kiss-Off" – 1951 mystery novel
