= Ralph Forbes =

English actor (1904–1951)

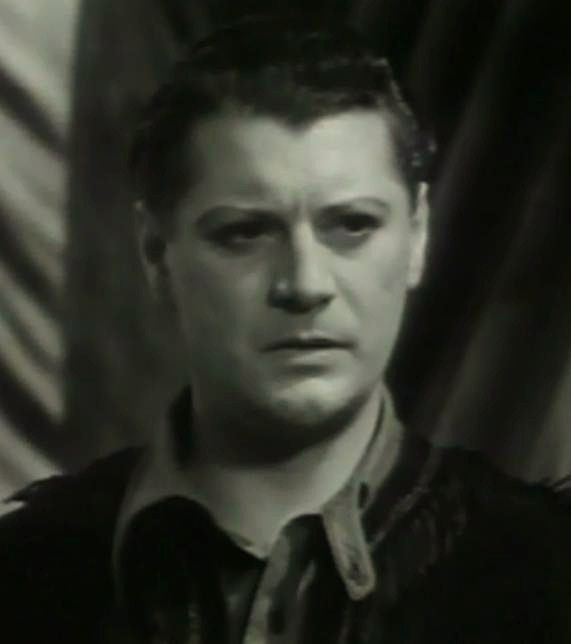
- Forbes in Daniel Boone (1936)
- Born: Ralph Forbes Taylor; 30 September 1904; Wandsworth, London, England
- Died: 31 March 1951 (aged 46); New York City, U.S.
- Occupation: Actor
- Years active: 1921–1950
- Spouses: Ruth Chatterton (m. 1924; div. 1932) Heather Angel (m. 1934; div. 1941) Dora Sayers (m. 1946)
- Mother: Mary Forbes
- Relatives: Brenda Forbes (sister)

Ralph Forbes (born Ralph Forbes Taylor; 30 September 1904 – 31 March 1951) was an English film and stage actor active in Britain and the United States.

== Early life ==
Forbes was born in Wandsworth, London, the son of Ernest John "E.J." and Ethel Louise Taylor. His mother would become known as Mary Forbes, a stage and film actress. His younger sister was actress Brenda Forbes (born Dorothy Brenda Taylor). Born on 30 September 1904, Forbes was baptized on 6 November and his birth was legally registered with the authorities during the last quarter of 1904.

Forbes met with an accident while playing football at Denstone College in Staffordshire which resulted in a scar on his cheek. He came to the United States as a member of a British troupe that performed Havoc, a war play. He started off in films, then went on stage.

In the United States he appeared onstage opposite actress Ruth Chatterton, whom he wed on 20 December 1924 in New York City. He was 20 years old and she was four days shy of her 32nd birthday. The couple divorced in 1932. He married actress Heather Angel in Yuma, Arizona, on 29 August 1934; that marriage ended in divorce on 18 July 1941. His last wife, whom he married in 1946, was actress Dora Sayers.

== Later years ==
Following a film career that spanned from 1926 to 1944, Forbes’s latter years were given to working on the Broadway stage. One of his last stage appearances was in a revival of Shaw's You Never Can Tell in 1948. He died at Montefiore Hospital in The Bronx, New York, in 1951, aged 46.

== Filmography ==
- The Fifth Form at St. Dominic's (1921) as Oliver Greenfield (film debut)
- A Lowland Cinderella (1921) as Master of Darrock
- The Glorious Adventure (1922) as Courtier (uncredited)
- Comin' Thro the Rye (1923) as George Tempest
- Reveille (1924) as The Kid
- Owd Bob (1924) as Davie McAdam
- Charley's Aunt (1926) as Jack Chesney
- Beau Geste (1926) as John Geste
- Mr. Wu (1927) as Basil Gregory
- The Enemy (1927) as Carl Behrend
- The Latest from Paris (1928) as Joe Adams
- The Trail of '98 (1928) as Larry
- Under the Black Eagle (1928) as Karl von Zorn
- The Actress (1928) as Arthur Gower
- The Whip (1928) as Lord Brancaster
- The Masks of the Devil (1928) as Manfred
- Restless Youth (1928) as Bruce Neil
- Lilies of the Field (1930) as Ted Willing
- The Green Goddess (1930) as Dr. Traherne
- Mamba (1930) as Karl von Reiden
- The Lady of Scandal (1930) as John
- Inside the Lines (1930) as Eric Woodhouse
- Her Wedding Night (1930) as Larry Charters
- The Bachelor Father (1931) - John Ashley
- Beau Ideal (1931) as John Geste
- Thunder Below (1932) as Davis
- Smilin'Through (1932) as Willie Ainley
- Christopher Strong (1933) as Harry Rawlinson
- The Phantom Broadcast (1933) as Norman Wilder
- Pleasure Cruise (1933) as Richard Orloff aka Taversham
- The Avenger (1933) as Norman Craig
- The Solitaire Man (1933) as Robert Bascom
- Bombay Mail (1934) as William Luke-Patson
- The Mystery of Mr. X (1934) as Sir Christopher Marche
- Riptide (1934) as Fenwick
- Twentieth Century (1934) as George Smith
- Shock (1934) as Derek Marbury
- The Fountain (1934) as Ballater
- The Barretts of Wimpole Street (1934) as Captain Surtees Cook
- Outcast Lady (1934) as Boy Fenwick
- Strange Wives (1934) as Paul
- Enchanted April (1935) as Peppo Briggs
- Rescue Squad (1935) as DeWitt Porter
- Streamline Express (1935) as Fred Arnold
- The Goose and the Gander (1935) as Ralph Summers
- The Three Musketeers (1935) as Duke of Buckingham
- La Fiesta de Santa Barbara (1935, Short)
- I'll Name the Murderer (1936) as Tommy Tilton
- Mary of Scotland (1936) as Randolph
- Piccadilly Jim (1936) as Lord Frederick 'Freddie' Priory
- Romeo and Juliet (1936) as Paris - Young Nobleman Kinsman to the Prince
- Daniel Boone (1936) as Stephen Marlowe
- Love Letters of a Star (1936) as Meredith Landers
- Rich Relations (1937) as Dave Walton
- The Last of Mrs. Cheyney (1937) as Cousin John
- The Thirteenth Chair (1937) as Lionel Trent
- The Legion of Missing Men (1937) as Bob Carter
- Make a Wish (1937) as Walter Mays
- Woman Against the World (1937) as Larry Steele
- Stage Door (1937) as Cast of Stage Play
- Women Are Like That (1938) as Martin Brush
- Kidnapped (1938) as James
- If I Were King (1938) as Oliver Le Dain
- Annabel Takes a Tour (1938) as Viscount Ronald River-Clyde
- Convicts at Large (1938) as David Brent
- The Hound of the Baskervilles (1939) as Sir Hugo Baskerville
- The Magnificent Fraud (1939) as Harrison Todd
- The Private Lives of Elizabeth and Essex (1939) as Lord Knollys
- Tower of London (1939) as Henry Tudor
- Calling Philo Vance (1940) as Tom McDonald
- Adventure in Diamonds (1940) as Mr. Perrins
- Curtain Call (1940) as Leslie Barrivale
- Frenchman's Creek (1944) as Harry St. Columb (final film)
