= Indian Education Service =

The Indian Education Service or Indian Educational Service (IES) formed part of the British Raj between 1896 and 1924, when overseas recruitment ceased. It was an administrative organisation running educational establishments in British India, largely staffed by Europeans, that was crucial to Macaulay's model of colonial education . It replaced a previous system of provincial administrations by a uniform all-India service.

The IES was formed based on the recommendations of the 1886 Public Service Commission, as part of the Superior Education Service, which comprised also the Provincial Education Service. In practice the IES was mostly British, and the Provincial Education Service was staffed by Indians, with substantial differentials of pay between the services. As a delayed consequence of the Islington Commission of 1912 on public services in India, the existing distinction between the IES and Provincial Education Service officials began to be dismantled in the early 1920s.

== Revival ==
There have been multiple proposals to revive the IES even in independent India. Most recently, the Bharatiya Janata Party central government proposed to revive the IES, as per comments in 2016 on its upcoming draft of National Education Policy 2020. The National Education Policy was adopted in 2020.

== See also ==
- Category:Indian Education Service officers
