= The Flying Deuces =

1939 film by A. Edward Sutherland

- Film poster
- Directed by: A. Edward Sutherland
- Written by: Ralph Spence; Charley Rogers; Fred Schiller; Harry Langdon
- Produced by: Boris Morros
- Starring: Stan Laurel; Oliver Hardy; Jean Parker; Reginald Gardiner
- Cinematography: Art Lloyd
- Edited by: Jack Dennis
- Music by: John Leipold; Leo Shuken
- Production company: Boris Morros Productions
- Distributed by: RKO Radio Pictures
- Release date: November 3, 1939
- Running time: 69 minutes
- Country: United States
- Language: English

The Flying Deuces (1939) by A. Edward Sutherland

The Flying Deuces, also known as Flying Aces, is a 1939 buddy comedy film starring Laurel and Hardy, in which the duo join the French Foreign Legion. It is a partial remake of their short film Beau Hunks (1931).

== Plot ==
During their sojourn in Paris, Ollie and Stan, temporarily distanced from their usual fish market work in Des Moines, Iowa, find themselves entangled in a romantic imbroglio. Ollie becomes enamored with Georgette, the daughter of an innkeeper, yet remains oblivious to her matrimonial ties to Francois, a Foreign Legion officer. Rejected by Georgette due to her existing marital commitment, Ollie experiences despondency, contemplating drastic measures until he is dissuaded by Stan's musings on reincarnation. Following Francois' suggestion, the duo enlists in the Foreign Legion, purportedly to alleviate Ollie's romantic woes.

Their legionnaire duties entail menial labor, met with resistance owing to their aversion to the meager wages offered. Subsequently sentenced to rigorous tasks, Ollie gradually relinquishes his romantic affliction amid the toil. Eventually, disillusioned by their laborious predicament, they incite chaos, inadvertently setting the laundry ablaze before expressing their disdain through a defiant letter.

Encounters with Georgette reignite Ollie's hopes, leading to a misunderstanding culminating in his arrest upon Francois' revelation of Georgette's marital status. Sentenced to death for desertion, Ollie and Stan find themselves incarcerated, their fate seemingly sealed until a fortuitous escape opportunity emerges. Inadvertent actions by Stan, however, divert their path to Francois' abode, igniting a pursuit culminating in an airborne escapade that concludes with a fatal crash resulting in Ollie's death confirmed by his soul ascending to heaven on wings. Stan later encounters a talking horse, purportedly embodying Ollie's reincarnated spirit.

== Cast ==
Principal credited cast members (in order of on-screen credits) and roles:

Actor	Role
Stan Laurel	Stan
Oliver Hardy	Ollie
Jean Parker	Georgette
Reginald Gardiner	François
Charles Middleton	Commandant
Jean Del Val	Sergeant
Clem Wilenchick	Corporal
James Finlayson	Jailor

Michael Visaroff appears uncredited as Georgette's father. Charles B. Middleton reprises the Legion Commandant role he played in Beau Hunks (1931), while Laurel and Hardy's frequent co-stars James Finlayson, Arthur Housman and Rychard Cramer also appear, respectively, as the jailor, a legionnaire who appears drunk, and the legionnaire who delivers the truckload of vegetables for the boys to work on.

== Production ==
As Laurel and Hardy did not have an exclusive contract with Hal Roach, they were able to appear in films for other studios as they pleased. A remake of Beau Hunks, The Flying Deuces was released by RKO Radio Pictures and was made by independent producer Boris Morros. Director A. Edward Sutherland and Stan Laurel did not get along during filming, with Sutherland having reportedly commented that he "would rather eat a tarantula than work with Laurel again".

The "laundry scene" in The Flying Deuces was filmed on the Iverson Movie Ranch in the Chatsworth section of Los Angeles, California. In the scene, the characters played by Laurel and Hardy, having disrupted training camp soon after joining the Foreign Legion, are forced to do a massive amount of laundry—seemingly the laundry for the entire Foreign Legion. For the shoot, a facsimile of a huge pile of laundry was built on top of one of the giant sandstone boulders of Iverson's Garden of the Gods, which is now a park. Aerial footage of the scene, including a large spread consisting of laundry hanging on lines, was shot for the movie, and was used briefly in the final flying scene as the set-up for a gag where the pair's cockpit is pelted with laundry. The footage later turned up in a number of other productions, including the Republic serials Manhunt of Mystery Island (1945) and Radar Patrol vs. Spy King (1949), along with the Allied Artists movie The Cyclops (1957).

== Critical reception ==
Leonard Maltin gave it three of four stars: "Good fun, faster paced than most L&H films, includes charming song and dance to Shine On, Harvest Moon." Leslie Halliwell wrote: "Patchy comedy from the end of the comedians' period of glory ... "

On Rotten Tomatoes, The Flying Deuces has a score of 83% based on six critic reviews, with an average rating of 6/10.

== Copyright status ==
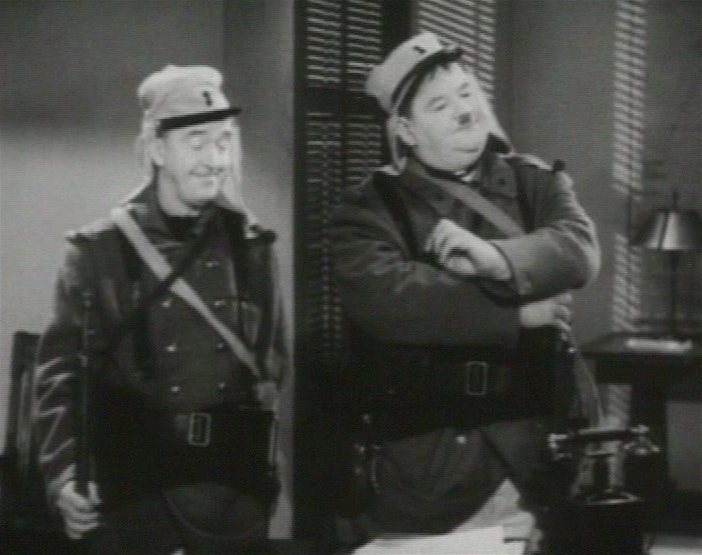
Stan and Ollie as "légionnaires" in The Flying Deuces

The Flying Deuces is one of two Laurel and Hardy features in the public domain. (The other is Atoll K.) As such, it regularly appears as part of inexpensive DVD or video compilations. Turner/Warner Bros. currently possesses the original negative but has not released the film.

When the film was originally released, it contained a scene featuring an escaped shark (a model fin being pulled back and forth) in the river into which Stan and Ollie are planning to jump. The scene was removed from some releases of the film. An uncut version, transferred from a nitrate 35mm negative discovered in France, was restored by Lobster Films and released by Kino Video in 2004. The Legend Films edition contains the edited version of the film.

In the United Kingdom, the Network imprint released the film on DVD and Blu-ray in 2015. This is the uncut version, as are the 2015 DVD-R and Blu-ray releases by VCI Entertainment in America. Unlike previous home video versions that have generally used a snatch of the opening music during the end titles, these releases include the correct closing music. A German-issued Blu-ray released by Edel Germany GmbH in October 2015 includes 3D and 2D versions of the film on a single disc.

== Music ==
- "Shine On, Harvest Moon"
- "The World Is Waiting for the Sunrise"

== See also ==
- List of films in the public domain in the United States
