= Guy Stockwell =

American actor (1933–2002)

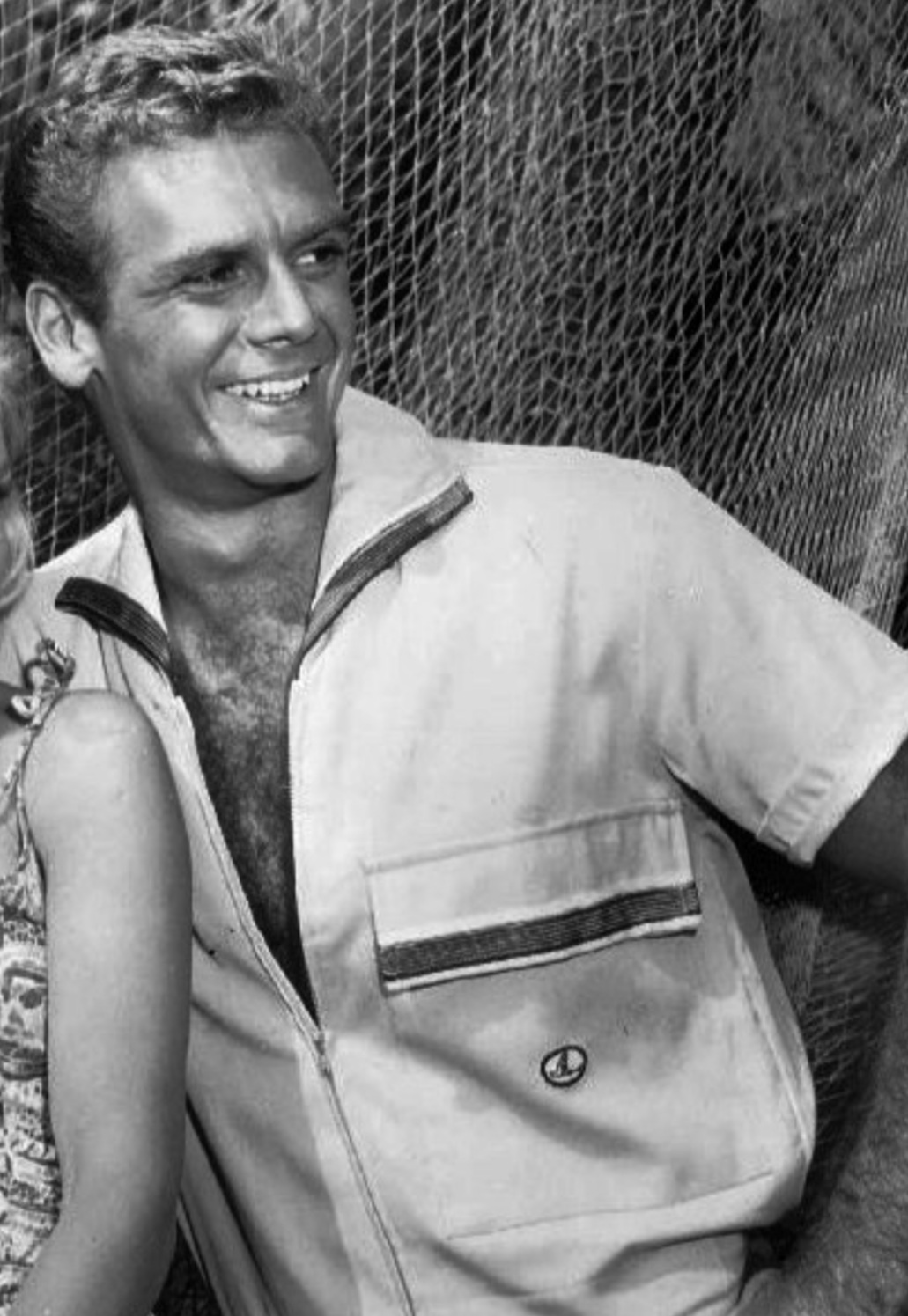
- Stockwell in Adventures in Paradise (1961)
- Born: Harry Guy Stockwell; November 16, 1933; New York City, U.S.
- Died: February 6, 2002 (aged 68); Prescott, Arizona, U.S.
- Occupation: Actor
- Years active: 1946–1990
- Spouses: Suzanne Olsen (m. 1954; div. 1963) Sandy Donigan (m. 1963; div. 1972): Olga Manriquez (m. 1975; div. 19??)
- Children: 3
- Father: Harry Stockwell
- Relatives: Dean Stockwell (brother)

Harry Guy Stockwell (November 16, 1933 – February 6, 2002) was an American actor who appeared in 26 feature films (credited), 4 made-for-television movies, and about 250 television series episodes.

== Life and career ==
Stockwell was born in New York City, the son of singer/dancer Elizabeth "Betty" Margareta Veronica and Harry Stockwell. Guy's father, a baritone singer/actor on Broadway, was famously known for singing the voice of Prince Charming in Disney's animated film Snow White and the Seven Dwarfs. Guy's younger brother was actor Dean Stockwell.

Stockwell began his acting career on the stage, working in the Broadway productions Innocent Voyage with his brother Dean and Chicken Every Sunday. That affinity for the stage would later inspire him to become a co-founder of the Los Angeles Art Theater. He then went on to hold the recurring role of Chris Parker from 1961 to 1962 in twenty-six episodes of the ABC series Adventures in Paradise, starring Gardner McKay as the skipper of a sailing vessel in the South Pacific.

Stockwell was also cast in episodes of The Roaring 20's, Perry Mason (Season 8, Episode 5), Mannix, Quincy, M.E., Simon & Simon, Knight Rider, The Fall Guy (Season 2, Episode 23, and Season 3, Episode 11), Tales of the Gold Monkey, The Eddie Capra Mysteries, Magnum, P.I., Murder, She Wrote, Columbo, Quantum Leap (with his brother Dean), Bonanza, Land of the Giants, Tombstone Territory, Combat!, The Richard Boone Show, Gunsmoke, Wagon Train (playing Coop Smith's "blood brother" bent on revenge in Season 8, Episode 10, "The Richard Bloodgood Story", which aired on November 28, 1964), The Virginian and Return to Peyton Place. He had important roles in several major motion pictures, including The War Lord (co-starring with Charlton Heston), The Plainsman, Blindfold, the leading role in Beau Geste, Tobruk, The Monitors, It's Alive and Santa Sangre.

Stockwell suffered from diabetes in later years and died of its complications. He was married and divorced three times and had three children.

== Filmography ==
- The Green Years (1946) - Young Boy (uncredited)
- The Mighty McGurk (1947) - Kid (uncredited)
- The Romance of Rosy Ridge (1947) - Joe (uncredited)
- Ask Any Girl (1959) - Boyfriend (uncredited)
- The Beat Generation (1959) - Hank - Police Detective (uncredited)
- The Gazebo (1959) - (voice, uncredited)
- Please Don't Eat the Daisies (1960) - Young Man (uncredited)
- Le tre spade di Zorro (1963) - Zorro
- The War Lord (1965) - Draco
- Blindfold (1966) - James Fitzpatrick
- And Now Miguel (1966) - George Perez
- The Plainsman (1966) - Buffalo Bill Cody
- Beau Geste (1966) - Beau Geste
- Tobruk (1967) - Lt. Mohnfeld
- Banning (1967) - Jonathan Linus
- The King's Pirate (1967) - John Avery
- In Enemy Country (1968) - Braden
- The Monitors (1969) - Harry Jordan
- Mannix (1971) - Season 5; Episode 1 "Dark So Early, Dark So Long" - John Ogilvie
- The Gatling Gun (1971) - Lt. Wayne Malcolm
- It's Alive (1974) - Bob Clayton
- The Disappearance of Flight 412 (1974) - Colonel Trottman
- Airport 1975 (1974) - Colonel Moss
- The Eddie Capra Mysteries (1978) - Captain - Episode: "The Two Million Dollar Stowaway"
- Burned at the Stake (1981) - Dr. Grossinger
- Forty Days of Musa Dagh (1982) - Simon Tomassian
- Whiz Kids (1983) - Episode "Airwave Anarchy"
- Grotesque (1988) - Orville Kruger
- Santa Sangre (1989) - Orgo
