= Beau Geste (1926 film) =

American silent drama by Herbert Brenon

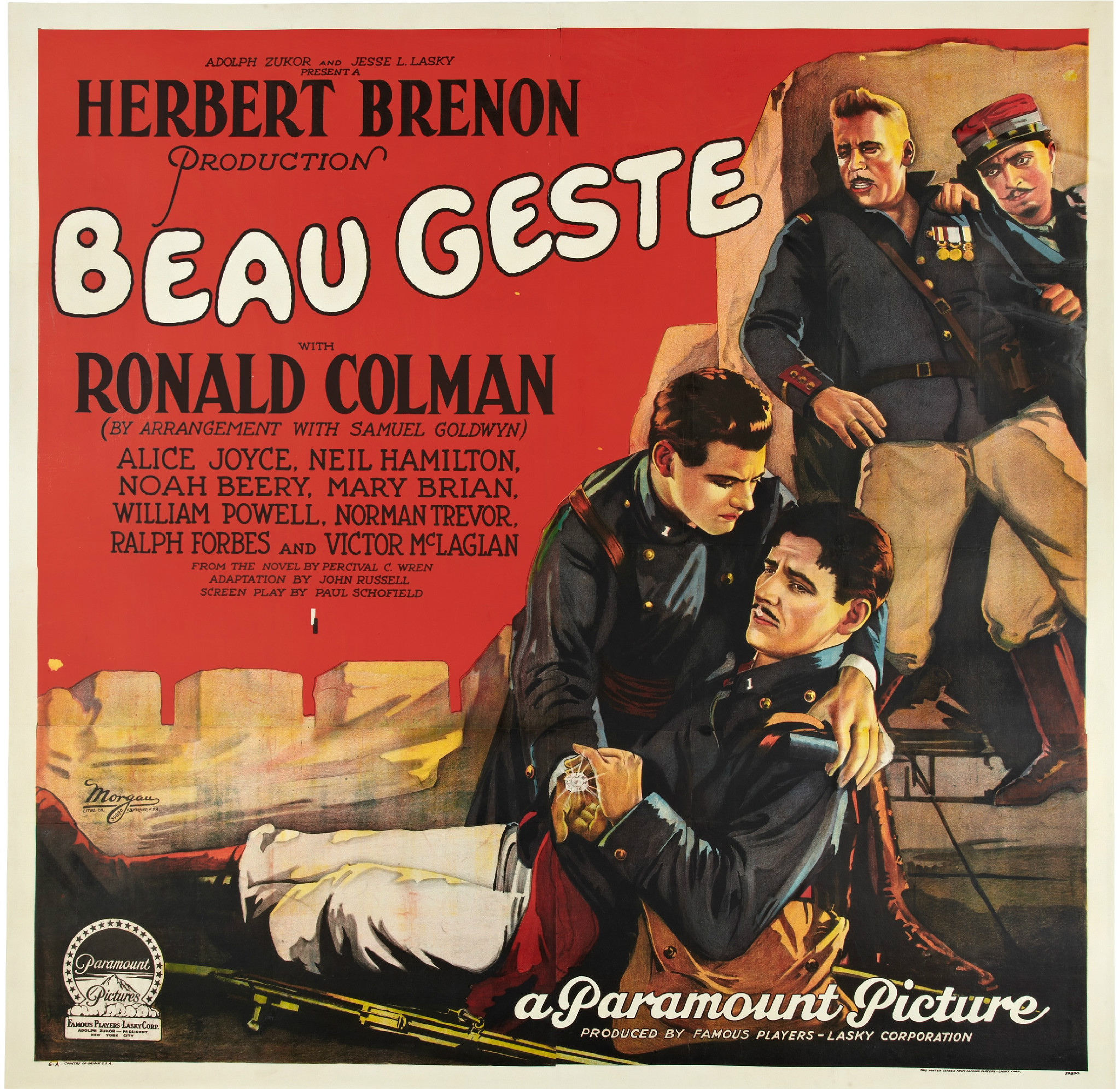
- Directed by: Herbert Brenon; Ray Lissner (assistant)
- Written by: Herbert Brenon; John Russell; Paul Schofield
- Based on: Beau Geste; 1924 novel by P. C. Wren
- Produced by: Jesse L. Lasky; Adolph Zukor; William LeBaron
- Starring: Ronald Colman; Neil Hamilton; Ralph Forbes
- Cinematography: J. Roy Hunt
- Edited by: Julian Johnson
- Music by: Hugo Riesenfeld; Hans Spialek
- Distributed by: Paramount Pictures
- Release date: August 25, 1926
- Running time: 101 minutes
- Country: United States
- Language: Silent (English intertitles)
- Budget: $900,000
- Box office: $1.5 million

Beau Geste is a 1926 American silent drama film directed by Herbert Brenon and based on the 1924 novel Beau Geste by P. C. Wren. Ronald Colman stars as the title character.

== Plot ==
Beau Geste (1926)

Major de Beaujolais leads a French Foreign Legion battalion across the Sahara desert to relieve Fort Zinderneuf, reportedly besieged by Arabs. When he arrives, he receives no response from the Legionnaires manning the walls, only a single shot. He realizes they are dead. The trumpeter volunteers to scale the wall and open the gate, but after waiting 15 minutes, the major climbs inside himself. He finds the dead commandant with a note in his hand addressed to the chief of police of Scotland Yard which states that the writer is solely responsible for the theft of the "Blue Water" sapphire from Lady Patricia Brandon. Soon after, the bodies of the commandant and the man beside him disappear. Then the fort is set afire. The major sends two Americans - later disclosed as the Geste's friends, Hank and Buddy, to fetch reinforcements.

The film then flashes back fifteen years to Kent, England. The three young Geste brothers and a girl named Isobel stage a naval battle with toy ships. When John Geste is accidentally shot in the leg, Michael "Beau" Geste digs the bullet out, then tells John that he is worthy of a Viking's funeral. Beau burns one ship, along with a toy soldier and a "dog" (broken off a vase). Beau then gets Digby, his other brother, to promise to give him a Viking's funeral if he dies first.

Lady Patricia cares for the Gestes, her orphaned nephews, while Isobel is her husband's niece. She introduces them to Rajah Ram Singh and then-Captain Henri de Beaujolais. Lady Patricia is in financial straits; her estranged husband "has taken every penny that comes from the estate."

After the children become adults, she receives a telegram, announcing that her husband intends to sell the "Blue Water", a family jewel. She has it brought to her. Someone turns out the lights and steals it. The next morning, Beau is gone, leaving Digby a note claiming to be the thief. Digby follows, writing to John that he is the culprit. John tells Isobel that he took the jewel and departs too.

John joins the Foreign Legion and is reunited with his brothers. Boldini overhears them joking about the jewel. That night, Boldini is caught stealing Beau's belt. Boldini tells Sergeant Lejaune about the jewel, supposedly hidden in Beau's belt. Lejaune assigns Digby and his American friends Hank and Buddy to Beaujolais, while he, Beau and John join a detachment, commanded by Lieutenant Maurel, marching to Fort Zinderneuf.

After Maurel dies, Lejaune assumes command at the fort. After a fortnight of Lejaune's cruelty, some of the men plot mutiny. Beau, John and three others remain loyal. Boldini tells Beau and John that Lejaune knows about the mutiny and plans to have the men kill each other so there will be no witnesses to his theft of the jewel. Lejaune arms the loyalists, then demands that Beau give him the jewel for "safekeeping", but is rebuffed. Lejaune captures the mutineers, but an Arab attack forces him to release and arm them.

Whenever a Legionnaire is killed, Lejaune props up his body on the battlement and makes it appear he is still alive. Finally, only Lejaune, Beau and John remain. Then Beau is seemingly killed. When John sees Lejaune searching Beau's body, he grabs his bayonet, but Lejaune draws his pistol and sentences him to death apparently intending to carry out the sentence immediately. Beau, barely alive, grabs Lejaune's leg, enabling John to stab him. Before dying, Beau tells John to desert and deliver a letter to their aunt. When John spots the relief force, he fires a single shot, then departs.

Digby, the trumpeter, climbs in and finds Beau's body. Remembering his childhood promise, he gives his brother a Viking's funeral, with a dog (Lejaune) at his feet. Then he deserts and finds John. They run into Hank and Buddy who, given the short time elapsed, may have deserted before fulfilling their order to summon reinforcements. Five days later, they are lost, with little water and only one camel left. Digby leaves a letter for the sleeping John (stating that one camel can carry three, but not four) and walks away.

John returns home to his love Isobel and delivers Beau's letter to Lady Patricia. She reads it aloud. Beau tells how he witnessed her selling the Blue Water to Ram Singh. To protect her, Beau stole the imitation.

== Cast ==
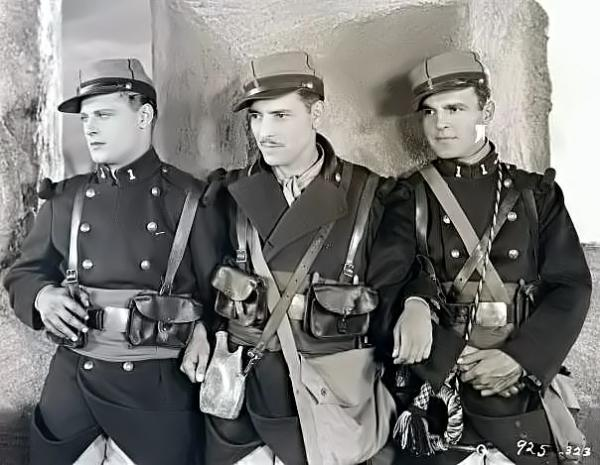
Left to right: Forbes, Colman and Hamilton

- Ronald Colman as Michael "Beau" Geste
- Neil Hamilton as Digby Geste
- Ralph Forbes as John Geste
- Alice Joyce as Lady Patricia Brandon
- Mary Brian as Isobel
- Noah Beery as Sergeant Lejaune
- Norman Trevor as Major de Beaujolais
- William Powell as Boldini
- George Regas as Maris
- Bernard Siegel as Schwartz
- Victor McLaglen as Hank
- Donald Stuart as Buddy
- Paul McAllister as St. Andre
- Redmond Finlay as Cordere
- Boghwan Singh as Prince Ram Singh (as Ram Singh)
- Maurice Murphy as Young Beau

== Production ==
The production was to be filmed in Algeria, but the Rif War interfered, so instead it was filmed in the desert east of Burlingame, California, and southwest of Yuma, Arizona. The same Yuma site was used for the 1939 film of the same name.

== Reception ==
Mordaunt Hall, critic for The New York Times, wrote that "Adventure, romance, mystery and brotherly affection are skillfully linked in the pictorial translation of Percival Christopher Wren's absorbing novel, 'Beau Geste'". He also complimented many of the principal performers: Colman ("easy and sympathetic"), Joyce ("charming"), Trevor ("effective") and Powell ("an excellent character study of Boldini"). The Variety review states it is:

a 'man's' picture. ... The picture is all story. In fact, only one cast member seems to get above the scenario. This is Noah Beery as the bestial sergeant-major. ... It’s undoubtedly one of his best portrayals.

A Toronto Film Society article stated, "Beau Geste is the archetype of the Foreign Legion movie, a carefully produced, enjoyable adventure yarn with an intriguing element of mystery. Melodrama and sentiment are handled with discretion and, at times, with an engaging sense of humor."

Beau Geste won the Photoplay Medal of Honor, presented by Photoplay magazine, one of the industry's first awards recognizing the best picture of the year.

== See also ==
- List of early color feature films
- The House That Shadows Built (1931), a promotional film released by Paramount which includes excerpts of this film
