= Beau Ideal (novel) =

1927 novel by P. C. Wren

First edition (publ. John Murray)

Beau Ideal is a 1927 novel by P. C. Wren. It was the second sequel to his 1924 novel Beau Geste.

It was adapted into the 1931 film Beau Ideal.

== Plot ==
The story is of Otis Vanbrugh, brother of Hank and Mary Vanbrugh, who featured in Beau Sabreur. Otis and Mary leave a despotic father in Wyoming and make the Grand Tour of Europe. After meeting a French colonel their travel extends to North Africa, where their adventures become entwined with those already narrated in Beau Sabreur and Beau Geste. In this third volume, and second sequel, definite disclosure is made of what happened the night the Blue Water was stolen and by whom (Wren will elaborate on this again in Spanish Maine). Raoul d'Auray de Redon appears as an unsung hero of the French Secret Service. Beau Ideal is the "American" novel of the so-called trilogy (which actually spans five books), as Beau Geste is the "British" novel and Beau Sabreur is the "French" novel. It is a tale of "ideal and platonic love".

The plot chiefly revolves around the devotion of Otis for Isobel Geste (née Rivers). He is asked by Isobel to find her husband John, who has disappeared in Africa while searching for his old friends Hank and Buddy. Otis, who was a childhood playmate of John and who is in love with Isobel, enlists in the French Foreign Legion with the idea of being sentenced to the penal battalion of the French Army of Africa (les Joyeux), and so find John and try to rescue him.

Arabs raid the section of the penal battalion and capture Otis and John. The Arab girl called the Death Angel falls in love with Otis and provides aid, opening the line for the ending of the saga, until rehashed in Spanish Maine.

All is then stitched and finished (with an elaborated and convoluted explanation of what really happened the night the Blue Water was stolen) in Spanish Maine, the fifth volume of the adventures of John Geste (the fourth, Good Gestes, is a collection of short stories, with another short one in Flawed Blades).
