= P. C. Wren =

English writer (1875–1941)

Percival Christopher Wren
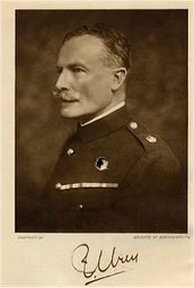
- Percival Christopher Wren 1914–15
- Born: Percival Christopher Wren; 1 November 1875; Deptford, South London, England; United Kingdom
- Died: 22 November 1941 (aged 66); Amberley, Gloucestershire
- Education: St Catherine's Society (St Catherine's College, Oxford)
- Occupations: Author, educator
- Spouses: Alice Lucille (1899−1914, her death); Isabel (1928–1941, his death)
- Children: Estelle Wren (1901–1910); Percival Rupert Christopher Wren (1904–)
- Writing career
- Notable work: Beau Geste (1924)

Percival Christopher Wren (1 November 1875 – 22 November 1941) was an English writer, mostly of adventure fiction. He is remembered best for the 1924 book Beau Geste which involves the French Foreign Legion in North Africa and was adapted to film several times. This was one of 33 novels and short story collections that he wrote, mostly dealing with colonial soldiering in Africa.

== Early life ==
Percival Christopher Wren was born at 37 Warwick Street in Deptford, South London, England, the son of a schoolmaster John Wilkins Wren, and his wife Ellen nee Sasbury. His literary influences included Frederick Marryat, R. M. Ballantyne, G. A. Henty, and H. Rider Haggard. He took a MA from Oxford University's Delegacy for Non-Collegiate Students, in 1931 renamed St Catherine's Society, now St Catherine's College, Oxford but then a non-collegiate institution for poorer students. Wren claimed to have worked as a navvy, deckhand, costermonger and fairground boxer during a three-year period between school and Oxford, as well as briefly enlisting in the British Army's 2nd Dragoon Guards (Queen's Bays).

Wren worked as a schoolmaster in a prep school for a few years, during which he married Alice Shovelier in 1899, and had a daughter (Estelle, born 1901). In 1903, he joined the Indian Education Service as headmaster of Karachi High School, serving until 1910. From 1910 to 1914 he was assistand director of public instruction in Bombay. Between 1904 and 1906 he also worked with the Educational Inspectorate for Sind and lectured at a teachers' training college.

== Military service ==
On 1 December 1914, Wren was commissioned as a reserve officer in the British Indian Army's 101st Grenadiers. His unit served in the East African campaign, including the Battle of Jassin in January 1915, but Wren was placed on sick leave on 17 February and was discharged from the British Indian army in October, returning to his civilian employment. Wren's obituaries claimed he had earlier served as an officer in the Indian Auxiliary Force's Poona Rifles, but historian Martin Windrow noted that this was due to Wren being confused with another officer of the same name.

== Later life ==
Wren, appointed principal of Elphinstone High School, Bombay in 1915, resigned from the Indian Education Service in November 1917 after a period of extended sick leave. His wife Alice Lucille had died 26 September 1914 in Poona, India; his daughter had died of pertussis (whooping cough) in Nottinghamshire on 19 May 1910. From there it is claimed that he joined the French Foreign Legion for a single tour of five years though he would have been 42 years of age on enlistment, somewhat older than the usual recruit and with a record of ill health. He lived out the remainder of his life in England concentrating on his literary career. One of the few photographs of Wren known (see above) shows a typical British Army officer of the Edwardian era with clipped moustache, wearing plain dark blue regimental dress.

== Wren as legionnaire ==
Wren was a highly secretive man, and his service in the Legion has never been confirmed. When his novels became famous, there was a mysterious absence of authenticating photographs of him as a legionnaire or of the usual press-articles by old comrades wanting to cash in on their memories of a celebrated figure. It is now thought more likely that he encountered legionnaires during travels in French North Africa, and skillfully blended their stories with his own memories of a short spell as a cavalry trooper in England. While his fictional accounts of life in the pre-1914 Foreign Legion are highly romanticised, his details of Legion uniforms, training, equipment and barrack room layout are generally accurate. This may, however, reflect careful research on his part. The descriptions of Legion garrison life given in his work The Wages of Virtue, published in 1916, closely match those contained in the autobiographical In the Foreign Legion by ex-legionnaire Edwin Rosen, published by Duckworth London 1910.

Similarly, the episode of the fallen soldiers in Beau Geste, who were propped up by Sergeant Major Lejaune to create the impression that they were still alive, was probably inspired by a story in Frederic Martyn's memoirs, Life in the Legion: from a Soldier's Point of View (1911):

"Our bugler was the first to lose his number: he was shot through the head as he stood in the angle of the parapet and remained standing up as if he were still effective.
This gave us an idea, and as each man fell afterwards we propped him up behind with a bayonet and stood him against the parapet. When the sergeant went out we stuck his pipe in his mouth, and he looked regular life-like, only more determined. Soon there was a row of dead men guarding the blockhouse, and they looked so calm and confident that the Oulad-Seghir evidently thought it would be too risky to come to close quarters with us, and gave up the attempt on the post in disgust, so that when our company came to our rescue at the double there was nothing for them to do."

The Historical and Information Service of the Foreign Legion holds no record of service by anyone of Wren's name and have stated their belief that he obtained his information from a legionnaire discharged in 1922. In a history published in 2010, the military writer Martin Windrow examines in detail the evidence for and against Wren's service with the Foreign Legion before concluding that, in the absence of some further documentary discovery, the question is an insoluble one.

== Family ==
Among the mysteries of Wren's life is the confirmed identity of his first wife. His stepson Alan Graham-Smith was told only that both she and a young daughter "Boodle" died at some date after 1905.

There is a record of the marriage of Percy Wren son of John Wickins (sic) Wren and Alice Lucie Shovelier daughter of Crispin Shovelier on 23 Dec 1899 at St James, Hatcham, London. Alice Lucille Shovelier was baptised 18 Mar 1870 the daughter of Crispin Shovelier and Lucy Maria Parker. Alice Lucille Wren died at Poona, India 26 Sep 1914 and was buried 27 Sep 1914. Their daughter Estelle Lenore Wren was born at Greenwich in early 1901. She died at Basford, Nottingham in 1910.

Wren reportedly dedicated an early edition (no date known) of The Snake and the Sword to "my wife Alice Lucille Wren". Another of his early novels, Driftwood Spars, published in 1915, contained a dedication: "To the memory of my beloved wife."

Isabel was his second wife. She had previously been married to Cyril Graham-Smith, a civil engineer employed in the Indian educational service at Poona. In 1927, Graham-Smith filed for divorce, with Wren named as co-respondent. The divorce was granted, and a letter by Isabel to Ronald Colman (who played Beau Geste in the silent film) in 1929 on behalf of her "seriously ill" husband suggests that she and Wren had married at least as early as 1928 (actual date 3 December 1927). "Isobel" was the heroine of Beau Geste.

Wren died in 1941, and was buried in the graveyard of Holy Trinity Church, Amberley, Gloucestershire.

At his death, Wren was survived by his son Percival Rupert Christopher Wren, born in Karachi in 1904. Percival Wren reportedly did not have a close relationship with his father, and the two ceased to have any contact after the son went to live in the United States during the 1920s. Wren adopted Isabel's son from her first marriage, Richard Alan Graham-Smith, as his own. After many years teaching, Graham-Smith, known to most people simply as Alan, retired to Devon, where he lived in the South Hams coastal village of Torcross until his death on 31 December 2006 at the age of 96. Graham-Smith ended up becoming the sole administrator of Wren's estate for many years and possibly the last living person to have any personal acquaintance with Wren. He insisted that Wren had indeed served in the French Foreign Legion, and was quick to contradict those who said otherwise.

== Bibliography ==
- The Indian Teacher's Guide to the Theory and Practice of Mental, Moral, and Physical Education (1910 Bombay)
- Indian School Organization, Management, Discipline, Tone, and Equipment, Being the Indian Headmaster's Guide (1911 Bombay)
- The Direct Teaching of English in Indian Schools (1911 Bombay)
- Dew and Mildew: Semi-Detached Stories from Darabad, India (1912 UK)
- Chemistry and First Aid for Standard VII with H.E.H. Pratt (1913 Bombay)
- Father Gregory; or, Lures and Failures: A Tale of Hindustan (1913 UK/1926 US)
- Physics and Mechanics with N.B. Macmillan (1914 Bombay)
- Snake and Sword (1914 UK)
- The Wages of Virtue (1916 UK/1917 US)
- Driftwood Spars (1916 UK/1927 US)
- Stepsons of France (1917 UK/1917 US)
- The Young Stagers, Being Further Faites and Gestes of the Junior Carlton Club of Karabad, India... (1917 UK/1926 US)
- Cupid in Africa; or, The Baking of Bertran in Love and War – A Character Study (1920 UK)
- With the Prince through Canada, New Zealand, and Australia (1922 Bombay)
- The Snake and the Sword (1923 US), reprint of 1914 text
- Beau Geste (1924 UK/1925 US)
- Beau Sabreur (1926 UK/US)
- Dew and Mildew: A Loose-Knit Tale of Hindustan (1927 US), reprint of 1912 text
- Beau Ideal (1928 UK/US)
- Good Gestes: Stories of Beau Geste, His Brothers, and Certain of Their Comrades in the French Foreign Legion (1929 UK/US)
- Soldiers of Misfortune: The Story of Otho Bellême (1929 UK/US)
- Mysterious Waye: The Story of "The Unsetting Sun" (1930 UK/US)
- The Mammon of Righteousness: The Story of Coxe and the Box (1930 UK/US)
- Valiant Dust (1932 UK/US)
- Action and Passion (1933 UK/US)
- Flawed Blades: Tales from the Foreign Legion (1933 UK/US)
- Beggars' Horses (1934 UK)
- Port o' Missing Men: Strange Tales of the Stranger Regiment (1934 UK/1943 US)
- Sinbad the Soldier (1935 UK/US)
- Explosion (1935 UK)
- Spanish Maine (1935 UK) Published as The Desert Heritage in US
- Fort in the Jungle: The Extraordinary Adventures of Sinbad Dysart in Tonkin (1936 UK/US)
- Bubble Reputation (1936 UK) Published as The Cortenay Treasure in US
- The Man of a Ghost (1937 UK) Published as The Spur of Pride in US
- Worth Wile (1937 UK) Published as To the Hilt in US
- Cardboard Castle (1938 UK/US)
- Rough Shooting: True Tales and Strange Stories (1938 UK/1944 US)
- Paper Prison (1939 UK) Published as The Man the Devil Didn't Want in US
- The Disappearance of General Jason (1940 UK)
- Two Feet from Heaven (1940 UK/1941 US)
- Odd – But Even So: Stories Stranger Than Fiction (1941 UK/1942 US)
- The Uniform of Glory (1941 UK)
- The Dark Woman (1943 US), reprint of 1934 UK text Beggar' Horses
- The Hunting of Henri (1944 UK), reprint of a short story
- Stories of the Foreign Legion (1947 UK), reprints of short stories
- Dead Men's Boots and Other Tales from the Foreign Legion (1949 UK), reprints of short stories

== Edited and revised works ==
- The World of India, Adapted for Use in Indian Schools, edited by Wren (1905 Calcutta)
- Sir Walter Scott's Ivanhoe, edited and simplified by Wren (1912 UK)
- Longman's Science Series for Indian High Schools, 11 volumes edited by Wren (1913–14 Bombay)
- SOWING GLORY The Memoirs of "Mary Ambree" an Englishwoman in the ranks of the French Foreign Legion (edited by Wren in 1931)
- Ernest F. Row's Work, Wealth, and Wages, revised by Wren (1950 Bombay)
- First Lessons in English Grammar (1961 Bombay)
- Jonathan Swift's Gulliver's Travels, edited and simplified by Wren (1963 Calcutta)

== See also ==
- Emilio Salgari
- Rafael Sabatini
- Samuel Shellabarger
- Lawrence Schoonover
- Goumiere
- Wren & Martin
