= Congleton Players =

Amateur theatre group in Congleton, Cheshire, United Kingdom, formed in 1935

- Official logo of Congleton Players

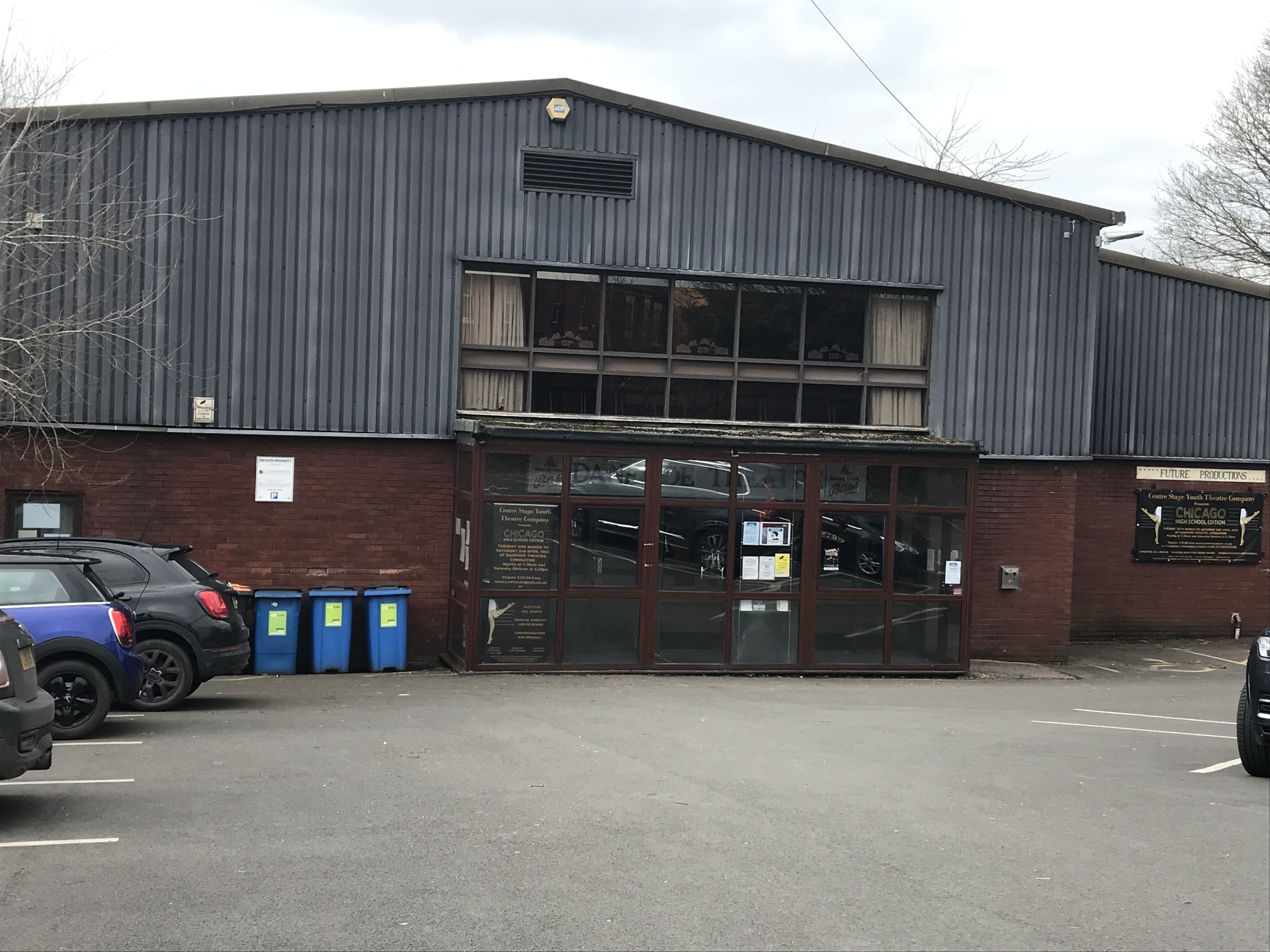
- Daneside Theatre is the current home of the Congleton Players.
- Formation: October 1935; 90 years ago
- Type: Theatre group
- Purpose: Amateur theatrical group
- Location: Daneside Theatre, Congleton, Cheshire
- Members: 50 (In 2000)
- Notable members: Jonathon Morris
- Website: Official website

Congleton Players is an amateur theatre group based in Congleton, Cheshire. The Congleton Players was founded in October 1935. Congleton Players perform three plays a year at Daneside Theatre.

The theatre group is a member of the National Operatic and Dramatic Association.

== History ==
=== Early years ===
The Congleton Players was formed as a breakaway group from Congleton Operatic Society in October 1935. The first production by the Congleton Players was Polly with a Past which was performed at Congleton Town Hall between 25 and 28 March 1936, all proceeds from Polly with a Past went to the Mayor's fund for Poor Children's Outing.

=== First theatre ===
The Congleton Players' first theatre was converted from a former warehouse in Congleton into a 150 seat theatre. Writing In the April 1974 issue of Cheshire Life Cathrine Scott described the Congleton Players' theatre as a "professional little theatre". The Congleton Players were originally allowed to use the warehouse for free, because the owner's daughters were early members of the Congleton Players; this arrangement later changed to a rental agreement.

In the 1970s the Congleton Players were given notice that their "home" would be demolished because of the building of the then new inner relief road Mountbatten Way. The Congleton Players final production at their old theatre was Night Must Fall in March 1978, after the production finished the warehouse the Congleton Players were using as a theatre was knocked down, and due to the Congleton Players not owing the warehouse they received no compensation for the loss of their theatre.

=== Daneside Theatre ===
Following the demolition of their theatre the members of the Congleton Players decided it was time for all the theatrical societies in Congleton to have a single dedicated theatre to use, this decision lead to the construction of Daneside Theatre. In the years between the demolition of their theatre and the opening of Daneside Theatre the Congleton Players used Trinity Church Hall for their performances, and rented West Lodge from Cheshire County Council which was used to hold auditions amongst other things.

Following moving into Daneside Theatre in 1984, The Congleton Players performed Dear Octopus between 8-12 January 1985 which was their first solo production at the new theatre.

=== Present ===
In 2017 it was announced that it was planned that the then Parliamentary Under-Secretary of State for Sport, Tourism and Civil Society John Glen MP, would attend the Congleton Players' 300th production.

=== Past events and memberships ===
In the past the Congleton Players was a member of the Mid Cheshire Theatre Guild, and have hosted one act plays festivals, with audience members picking the winner.

In the 1970s the Congleton Players had a membership of over 800, however by the year 2000 this had fallen to just 50 members.

== Past productions ==
Below is a list of some of the Congleton Players past productions:

- Polly with a Past (25-28 March 1936)
- Night Must Fall (March 1978)
- Curtain Up (3-6 October 1984)
- Dear Octopus (8-12 January 1985)

== Notable members ==
- Jonathon Morris actor in the TV series Bread started his acting career with the Congleton Players.

== Awards ==
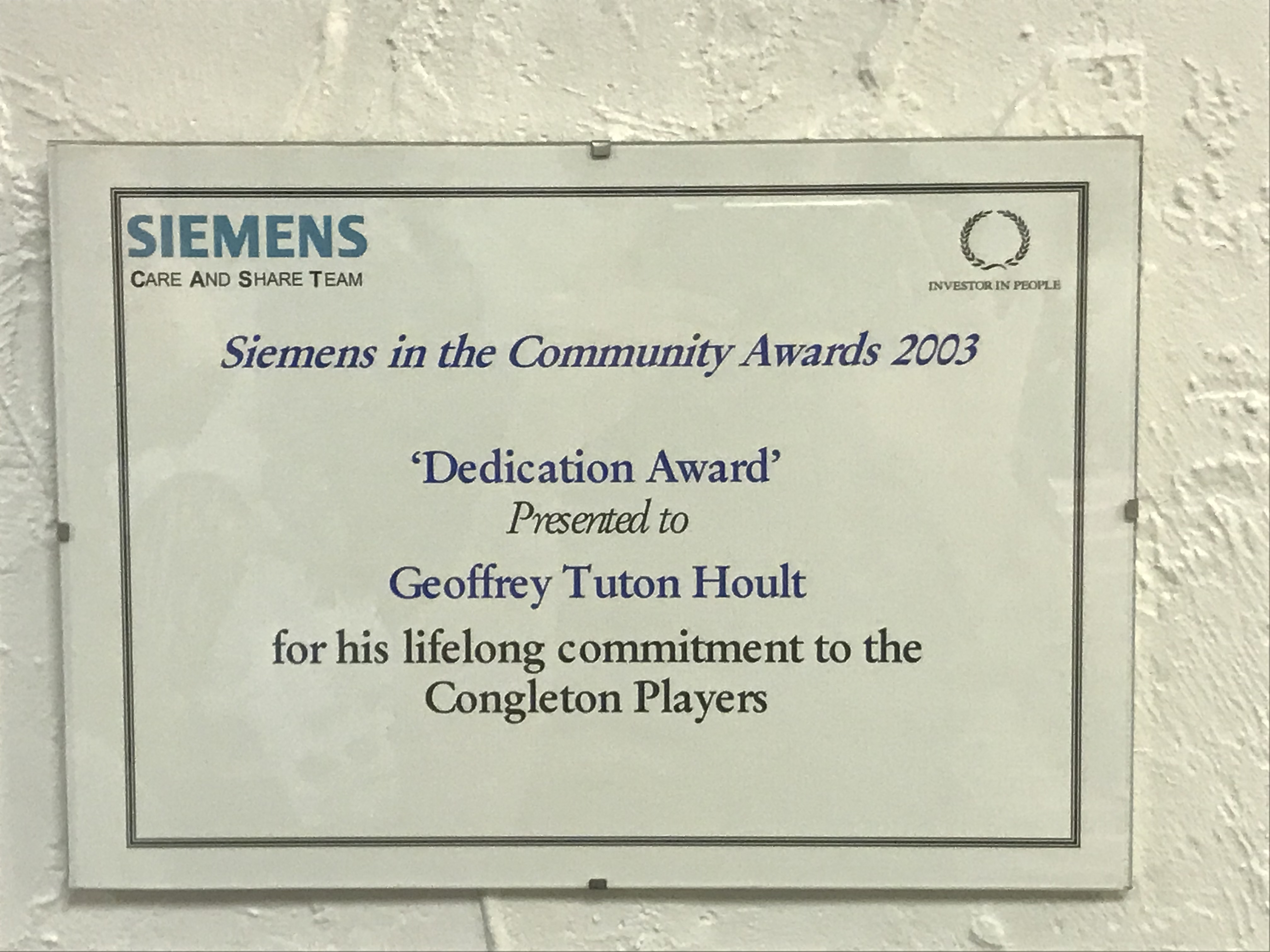
Siemens in the Community Award for Geoffrey Tuton Hoult.

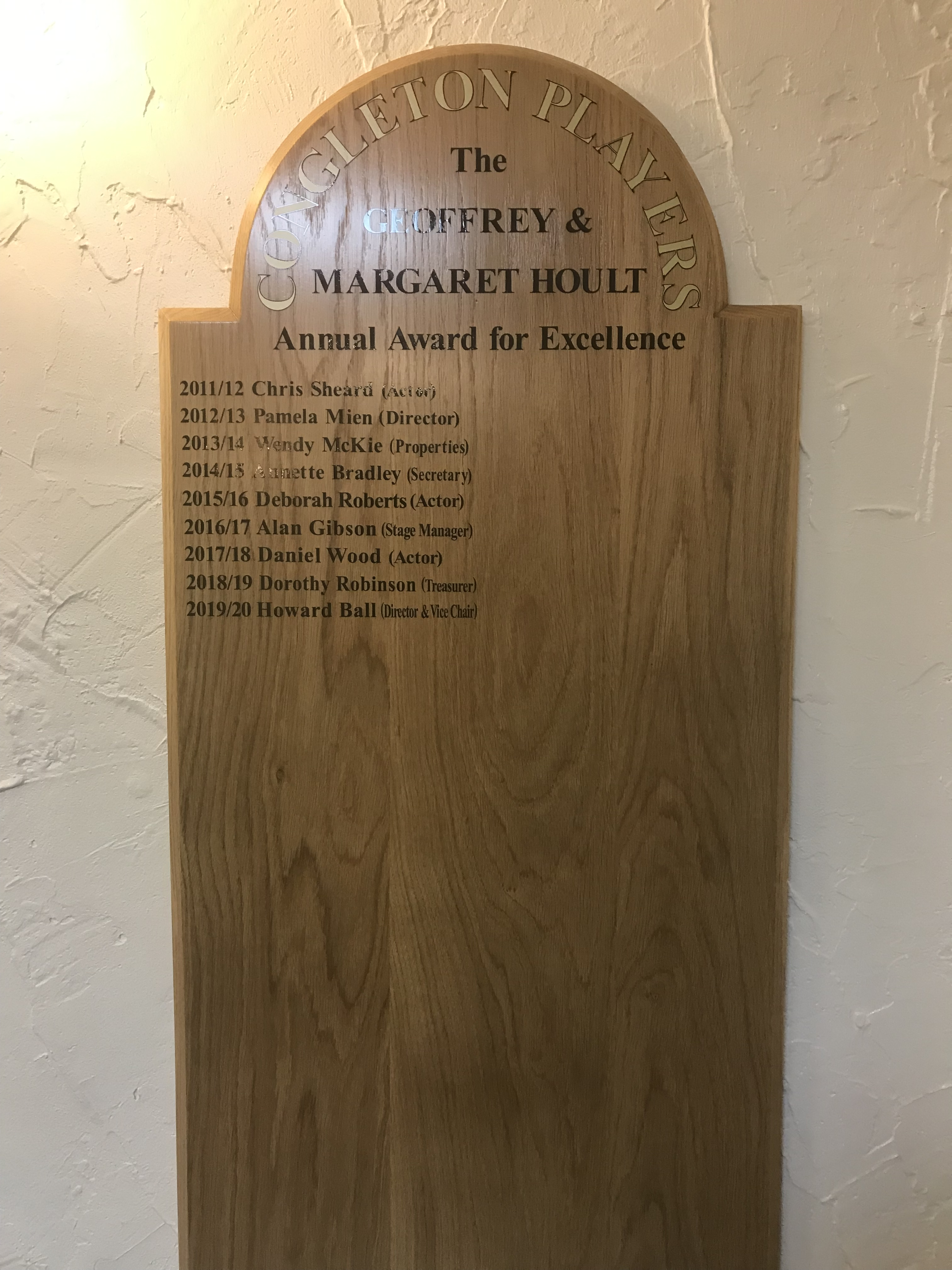
Congleton Players Geoffrey and Margaret Hoult Annual Award for Excellence board as of July 2022.

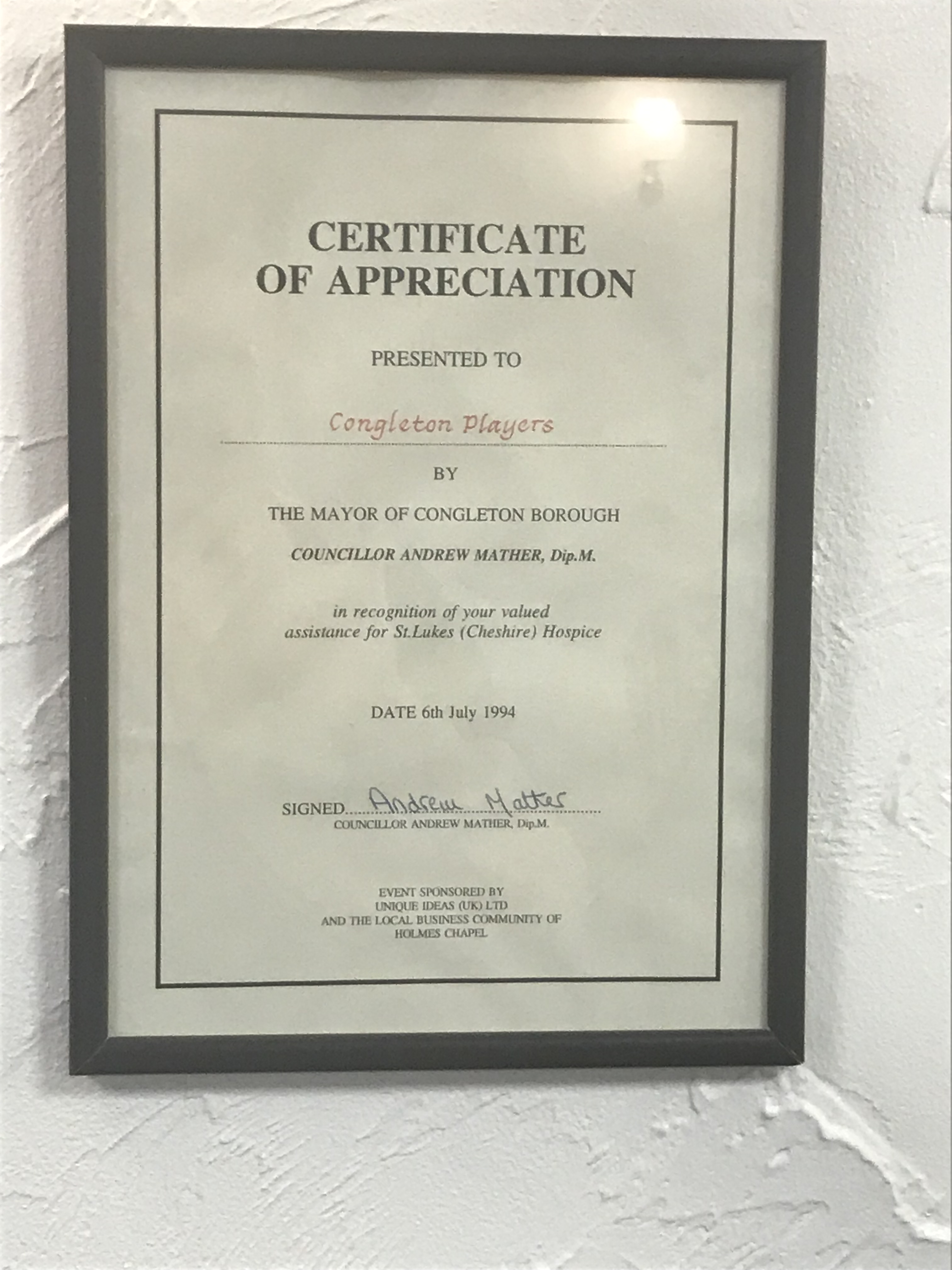
1994 Certificate Of Appreciation to the Congleton Players in recognition of their valued assistance for ST Lukes (Cheshire) Hospice.

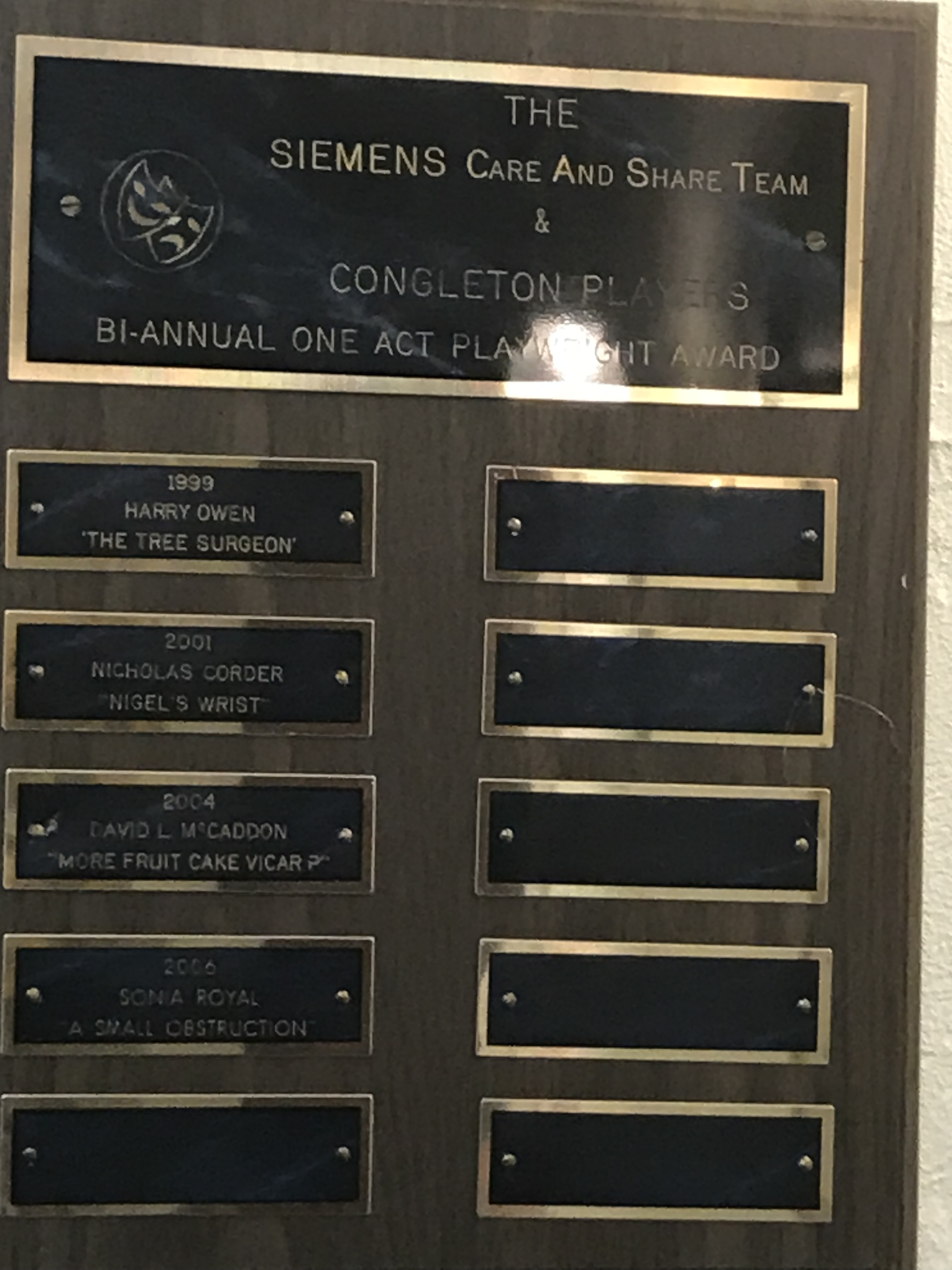
Congleton Players and Siemens Awards Plaque for One Act Playwrights.

The following people linked to the Congleton Players have won awards while members of the Congleton Players.

- Geoffrey Tuton Hoult (Congleton Players set designer and set builder) Siemens in the Community Dedication Award 2003
- Dave Burt (Actor) role:Danny in Brassed Off (Best Male Lead Actor In A Drama NODA North West awards 2017)
- Nigel Evens (Director) production:The Crucible (Best Artistic Director Of A Drama NODA North West awards 2017)
- Adrian Grace (Actor) role:Mr Oakley in Goodnight Mr Tom (Best Leading Male in a Drama NODA North West District 8 2020 awards)
- Charlie House (Actor) role:William Beech in Goodnight Mr Tom (Best Male Youth Performance In An Adult Production NODA North West District 8 2020 awards)
- Cherryll Topham (Actress) role:Dolly in One Man Two Guvenors (Best Leading Female in a Drama NODA North West District 8 2020 awards)
- Niamh Moss (Actress) role:Bobby in The Railway Children (Best Female Youth Performance in an Adult Production NODA district awards 2023)
- Louise Colman (Director) production:Calendar Girls (Best Director of a Drama NODA district award)

The Congleton Players as a theatre group have won the following awards.

- 1994 Certificate Of Appreciation from Mayor of Congleton Borough in recognition of the Congleton Players valued assistance for ST Lukes (Cheshire) Hospice.
- Best Drama (NODA North West District 8 2018 awards)
- Best Direction: The Railway Children (NODA award)
- Best Drama: Frankenstein (NODA award)
- Most Original Drama Award: Frankenstein (Association Of Community Theatre (ACT) Award)
- Outstanding Theatrical Achievement: The Good Life (Community Theatre Awards Award)
