= List of Bread episodes =

Bread is a British television sitcom, written by Carla Lane, about a close-knit, working-class family in Liverpool. 74 episodes aired, over 7 series and 3 Christmas specials, between 1986 and 1991.

== Series overview ==
Series	Episodes	Originally released	
Series	Episodes	First released	Last released
1	6	1 May 1986	5 June 1986
2	6	8 January 1987	19 February 1987
3	7	6 September 1987	29 November 1987
4	6	18 September 1988	11 December 1988
Special		25 December 1988	
5	13	10 September 1989	3 December 1989
Special		25 December 1989	
6	10	2 September 1990	4 November 1990
Special		25 December 1990	
7	10	1 September 1991	3 November 1991

== Episodes ==
=== Series 1 (1986) ===
No. overall	No. in series	Title	Directed by	Written by	Original release date	UK viewers (millions)
1	1	"Series 1 Episode 1"	Susan Belbin	Carla Lane	1 May 1986	12.60
2	2	"Series 1 Episode 2"	Susan Belbin	Carla Lane	8 May 1986	13.05
3	3	"Series 1 Episode 3"	Susan Belbin	Carla Lane	15 May 1986	N/A
4	4	"Series 1 Episode 4"	Susan Belbin	Carla Lane	22 May 1986	11.60
5	5	"Series 1 Episode 5"	Susan Belbin	Carla Lane	29 May 1986	N/A
6	6	"Series 1 Episode 6"	Susan Belbin	Carla Lane	5 June 1986	N/A

=== Series 2 (1987) ===
No. overall	No. in series	Title	Directed by	Written by	Original release date	UK viewers (millions)
7	1	"Series 2 Episode 1"	Susan Belbin	Carla Lane	8 January 1987	N/A
8	2	"Series 2 Episode 2"	Susan Belbin	Carla Lane	15 January 1987	N/A
9	3	"Series 2 Episode 3"	Susan Belbin	Carla Lane	22 January 1987	N/A
10	4	"Series 2 Episode 4"	Susan Belbin	Carla Lane	5 February 1987	12.95
11	5	"Series 2 Episode 5"	Robin Nash	Carla Lane	12 February 1987	N/A
12	6	"Series 2 Episode 6"	Robin Nash	Carla Lane	19 February 1987	N/A

=== Series 3 (1987) ===
No. overall	No. in series	Title	Directed by	Written by	Original release date	UK viewers (millions)
13	1	"Series 3 Episode 1"	Susan Belbin	Carla Lane	6 September 1987	12.20
14	2	"Series 3 Episode 2"	Susan Belbin	Carla Lane	13 September 1987	11.10
15	3	"Series 3 Episode 3"	Susan Belbin	Carla Lane	20 September 1987	13.40
16	4	"Series 3 Episode 4"	Susan Belbin	Carla Lane	27 September 1987	N/A
17	5	"Series 3 Episode 5"	Susan Belbin	Carla Lane	4 October 1987	12.50
18	6	"Series 3 Episode 6"	Susan Belbin	Carla Lane	11 October 1987	13.65
19	7	"Series 3 Episode 7"	Susan Belbin	Carla Lane	18 October 1987	14.40

=== Series 4 (1987) ===
No. overall	No. in series	Title	Directed by	Written by	Original release date	UK viewers (millions)
20	1	"Series 4 Episode 1"	Robin Nash	Carla Lane	25 October 1987	14.60
21	2	"Series 4 Episode 2"	Robin Nash	Carla Lane	1 November 1987	15.00
22	3	"Series 4Episode 3"	Robin Nash	Carla Lane	8 November 1987	15.80
23	4	"Series 4 Episode 4"	Robin Nash	Carla Lane	15 November 1987	15.10
24	5	"Series 4 Episode 5"	Robin Nash	Carla Lane	22 November 1987	16.00
25	6	"Series 4 Episode 6"	Robin Nash	Carla Lane	29 November 1987	14.85

=== Series 5 (1988) ===
No. overall	No. in series	Title	Directed by	Written by	Original release date	UK viewers (millions)
26	1	"Series 5 Episode 1"	Robin Nash	Carla Lane	18 September 1988	N/A
27	2	"Series 5 Episode 2"	Robin Nash	Carla Lane	25 September 1988	N/A
28	3	"Series 5 Episode 3"	Robin Nash	Carla Lane	2 October 1988	N/A
29	4	"Series 5 Episode 4"	Robin Nash	Carla Lane	9 October 1988	16.45
30	5	"Series 5 Episode 5"	Robin Nash	Carla Lane	16 October 1988	17.25
31	6	"Series 5 Episode 6"	Robin Nash	Carla Lane	23 October 1988	17.10
32	7	"Series 5 Episode 7"	Robin Nash	Carla Lane	30 October 1988	19.90
33	8	"Series 5 Episode 8"	Robin Nash	Carla Lane	6 November 1988	N/A
34	9	"Series 5 Episode 9"	Robin Nash	Carla Lane	13 November 1988	N/A
35	10	"Series 5 Episode 10"	Robin Nash	Carla Lane	20 November 1988	N/A
36	11	"Series 5 Episode 11"	Robin Nash	Carla Lane	27 November 1988	N/A
37	12	"Series 5 Episode 12"	Robin Nash	Carla Lane	4 December 1988	20.15
38	13	"Series 5 Episode 13"	Robin Nash	Carla Lane	11 December 1988	20.95

=== Special (1988) ===
No. overall	No. in series	Title	Directed by	Written by	Original release date	UK viewers (millions)
39	14	"Christmas Special"	N/A	Carla Lane	25 December 1988	18.00

=== Series 6 (1989) ===
No. overall	No. in series	Title	Directed by	Written by	Original release date	UK viewers (millions)
40	1	"Series 6 Episode 1"	Robin Nash	Carla Lane	10 September 1989	N/A
41	2	"Series 6 Episode 2"	Robin Nash	Carla Lane	17 September 1989	N/A
42	3	"Series 6 Episode 3"	Robin Nash	Carla Lane	24 September 1989	N/A
43	4	"Series 6 Episode 4"	Robin Nash	Carla Lane	1 October 1989	N/A
44	5	"Series 6 Episode 5"	Robin Nash	Carla Lane	8 October 1989	N/A
45	6	"Series 6 Episode 6"	Robin Nash	Carla Lane	15 October 1989	N/A
46	7	"Series 6 Episode 7"	Robin Nash	Carla Lane	22 October 1989	N/A
47	8	"Series 6 Episode 8"	Robin Nash	Carla Lane	29 October 1989	N/A
48	9	"Series 6 Episode 9"	Robin Nash	Carla Lane	5 November 1989	N/A
49	10	"Series 6 Episode 10"	Robin Nash	Carla Lane	12 November 1989	N/A
50	11	"Series 6 Episode 11"	Robin Nash	Carla Lane	19 November 1989	N/A
51	12	"Series 6 Episode 12"	Robin Nash	Carla Lane	26 November 1989	N/A
52	13	"Series 6 Episode 13"	Robin Nash	Carla Lane	3 December 1989	N/A

=== Special (1989) ===
No. overall	No. in series	Title	Directed by	Written by	Original release date	UK viewers (millions)
53	S	"Christmas Special"	Robin Nash	Carla Lane	25 December 1989	16.51

=== Series 7 (1990) ===
No. overall	No. in series	Title	Directed by	Written by	Original release date	UK viewers (millions)
54	1	"Series 7 Episode 1"	John B Hobbs	Carla Lane	2 September 1990	N/A
55	2	"Series 7 Episode 2"	John B Hobbs	Carla Lane	9 September 1990	N/A
56	3	"Series 7 Episode 3"	John B Hobbs	Carla Lane	16 September 1990	N/A
57	4	"Series 7 Episode 4"	John B Hobbs	Carla Lane	23 September 1990	N/A
58	5	"Series 7 Episode 5"	John B Hobbs	Carla Lane	30 September 1990	N/A
59	6	"Series 7 Episode 6"	John B Hobbs	Carla Lane	7 October 1990	N/A
60	7	"Series 7 Episode 7"	John B Hobbs	Carla Lane	14 October 1990	N/A
61	8	"Series 7 Episode 8"	John B Hobbs	Carla Lane	21 October 1990	N/A
62	9	"Series 7 Episode 9"	John B Hobbs	Carla Lane	28 October 1990	N/A
63	10	"Series 7 Episode 10"	John B Hobbs	Carla Lane	4 November 1990	N/A

=== Special (1990) ===
No. overall	No. in series	Title	Directed by	Written by	Original release date	UK viewers (millions)
64	11	"Christmas Special"	John B Hobbs	Carla Lane	25 December 1990	N/A

=== Series 8 (1991) ===
No. overall	No. in series	Title	Directed by	Written by	Original release date	UK viewers (millions)
65	1	"Series 8 Episode 1"	John B Hobbs	Carla Lane	1 September 1991	N/A
66	2	"Series 8 Episode 2"	John B Hobbs	Carla Lane	8 September 1991	N/A
67	3	"Series 8 Episode 3"	John B Hobbs	Carla Lane	15 September 1991	N/A
68	4	"Series 8 Episode 4"	John B Hobbs	Carla Lane	22 September 1991	N/A
69	5	"Series 8 Episode 5"	John B Hobbs	Carla Lane	29 September 1991	N/A
70	6	"Series 8 Episode 6"	John B Hobbs	Carla Lane	6 October 1991	N/A
71	7	"Series 8 Episode 7"	John B Hobbs	Carla Lane	13 October 1991	N/A
72	8	"Series 8 Episode 8"	John B Hobbs	Carla Lane	20 October 1991	N/A
73	9	"Series 8 Episode 9"	John B Hobbs	Carla Lane	27 October 1991	N/A
74	10	"Series 8 Episode 10"	John B Hobbs	Carla Lane	3 November 1991	N/A

== Sources ==
- "Genome BETA Radio Times 1923 - 2009". BBC. Archived from the original on 9 July 2020.
- "Bread - Episodes". BBC.
