= The Movie Game =

The Movie Game may refer to:

- The Movie Game (British TV series), a 1988–1996 game show
- The Movie Game (American TV series), a 1969–1972 game show hosted first by Sonny Fox, then by Larry Blyden
