= Melanie Hill =

English actress

- Born: Melanie Jane Hill; Brighton, East Sussex, England
- Education: Royal Academy of Dramatic Art
- Occupation: Actress
- Years active: 1984–present
- Known for: Bread; Playing the Field; The Street; Waterloo Road; The Syndicate; Coronation Street; Casualty
- Spouses: Sean Bean (m. 1990; div. 1997); Jimmy Daly (m. 2017)
- Children: 2

Melanie Jane Hill is a British actress. She is best known in television as Cathy Matthews in Coronation Street (2015–2022) and Siobhan McKenzie in Casualty (2024–present).

Hill has also played Hazel Redfern in Auf Wiedersehen, Pet (1985–1986), Aveline in Bread (1989–1991), Rita Dolan in Playing the Field (1998–2002), Maggie Budgen in Waterloo Road (2012–2015) and Julie Travers in The Syndicate (2015).

== Career ==
Hill was educated at Monkwearmouth School in Sunderland before attending the Royal Academy of Dramatic Art in London, where she won the Vanbrugh award. Hill replaced Gilly Coman in the role of Aveline in the last three series of Carla Lane's BBC television sitcom Bread. She has also appeared in such programmes as The Bill playing Marie Carver (née Graham), Auf Wiedersehen, Pet playing Hazel Redfern, Hot Money playing Liz Hoodless, Juliet Bravo playing Jean Simpson, Emmerdale playing Avril Kent and Cape Wrath playing Brenda Ogilvie.

On 17 March 2009, she was featured in an episode of Holby City, a medical drama broadcast weekly on BBC1 in the United Kingdom. She appeared in subsequent episodes, following a story arc relating to the death of her on-screen husband. She also appeared in an episode of The Thick of It (series 3 episode 3).

In April 2011, she appeared in the BBC television comedy drama series Candy Cabs and in November, in the fantasy series Merlin as Mary Howden. In April that year she appeared as Cissie Charlton, mother of footballers Jack and Bobby Charlton, in the BBC drama United, about the 1958 Munich air disaster involving Manchester United.

In 2012, she made her debut in long-running school drama Waterloo Road as Maggie.

In August 2013, it was announced that Hill had joined the cast of the BBC Two sitcom Hebburn. The next year she joined the Craig Cash sitcom After Hours.

In February 2015, it was announced that Hill would join the cast of Coronation Street as Cathy Matthews, and she made her first appearance on 20 April 2015. She was introduced as a potential love interest for Roy Cropper (David Neilson). Hill was nervous about the role as Roy's deceased wife, Hayley (Julie Hesmondhalgh), was loved by the nation. Hill also starred in the third series of The Syndicate in June 2015.

In October 2023, it was announced that Hill would join the cast of the BBC medical drama series Casualty as Siobhan McKenzie, a clinical nurse manager. Her first appearance aired on 24 February 2024.

Hill's feature film roles include Sandra in Brassed Off (1996), the witch Ditchwater Sal in the fantasy film Stardust (2007), and Sonya in White Girl (2008).

== Personal life ==
Born to Anthony and Sylvia (née Pratt) Hill in Brighton, Hill was raised in her mother's native city of Sunderland. She married fellow actor Sean Bean in December 1990. They have two daughters: Lorna, born October 1987, and Molly, born September 1991. They divorced in August 1997. She is a supporter of Sunderland A.F.C. She married writer and producer Jimmy Daly on 29 April 2017 at a pub in Muswell Hill, north London.

== Filmography ==
=== Film ===
Year	Title	Role
1993	The Hawk	Norma
1994	Shopping	Sarah
1996	When Saturday Comes	Mary Muir
1996	Brassed Off	Sandra
2001	From Hell	Ann Crook's Mother
2007	Stardust	Ditchwater Sal
2011	United	Cissie Charlton
2012	Unconditional	Mum
2012	Twenty8k	Elizabeth Fitch
2022	Passing Ships	Narrator (Epilogue)

=== Television ===
Year	Title	Role	Notes
1984	Juliet Bravo	Jean Simpson	2 episodes
1986	Auf Wiedersehen, Pet	Hazel Redfern	6 episodes
1989	ScreenPlay	Pauline	Episode: "A Night on the Tyne"
1989	Boon	Susan	Episode: "The Relief of Matty King"
1989	The Bill	Polly Beacher	Episode: "The Mugging and the Gypsies"
1989–1991	Bread	Aveline Boswell	Series regular; 35 episodes
1992	Spender	Sue Styles	Episode: "Fee"
1993	Casualty	Janice Hutchins	Episode: "Wild Card"
1993	The Bill	Lynda Chambers	Episode: "Living It Down"
1994	Cardiac Arrest	Sister Pamela Lockley	6 episodes
1994	Finney	Lena	Main role
1994	Crocodile Shoes	Emma Shepperd	Main role
1995	Performance	Laura	Episode: "The Widowing of Mrs. Holroyd"
1995	Circles of Deceit	Angie Norman	Episode: "Dark Secret"
1996	Cruel Train	Phyllis Pratt	TV film
1996	Crocodile Shoes II	Emma Shepperd	Main role
1998	The Broker's Man	Tracey Smeeton	Episode: "Playback"
1998–2002	Playing the Field	Rita Dolan	Series regular
1999	Silent Witness	Liz Davies	Episode: "Gone Tomorrow"
2000	Close and True	Maureen Taylor	Episode: "Hurry Up and Wait"
2001	Child in the Forest	Mam	TV film
2001	Hot Money	Liz Hoodless	TV film
2001–2002	NCS: Manhunt	DS Ruby Sparks	Series regular
2003	The Bill	Marie Carver	Series regular
2005	The Afternoon Play	Bonnie Reilly	Episode: "The Singing Cactus"
2005	The Fugitives	Glenda Banks	Main role
2005	Emmerdale	Avril Kent	Recurring role, 11 episodes
2005	The Brief	Rennie Nicholson	Episode: "Blame"
2007	Cape Wrath	Brenda Ogilvie	Main role
2007	The Street	Val Taylor	3 episodes
2008	White Girl	Sonya	TV film
2009	Holby City	Kathy Hewitt	2 episodes
2009	The Thick of It	Julie Price	1 episode
2010	Joe Maddison's War	Selina Rutherford	TV film
2011	Candy Cabs	Stella	Main role
2011	The Body Farm	Nicole Henderson	1 episode
2011	Merlin	Mary Howden	Episode: "Lamia"
2012–2015	Waterloo Road	Maggie Budgen	Main role
2013	Hebburn	Christine	2 episodes
2014	Cilla	Big Cilla	Main role
2015–2022	Coronation Street	Cathy Matthews	Regular role
2015	The Syndicate	Julie Travers	Main role
2015	After Hours	Liz Matthews	Episode: "Love Love Love"
2024–present	Casualty	Siobhan McKenzie	Main role
2026	Smoggie Queens	Vanessa Yaris	Episode: "A Smoggie Show"
