= Daneside Theatre =

Theatre in Congleton, Cheshire

Coordinates: 53.1657°N 2.21085°W

- Official logo of Daneside Theatre

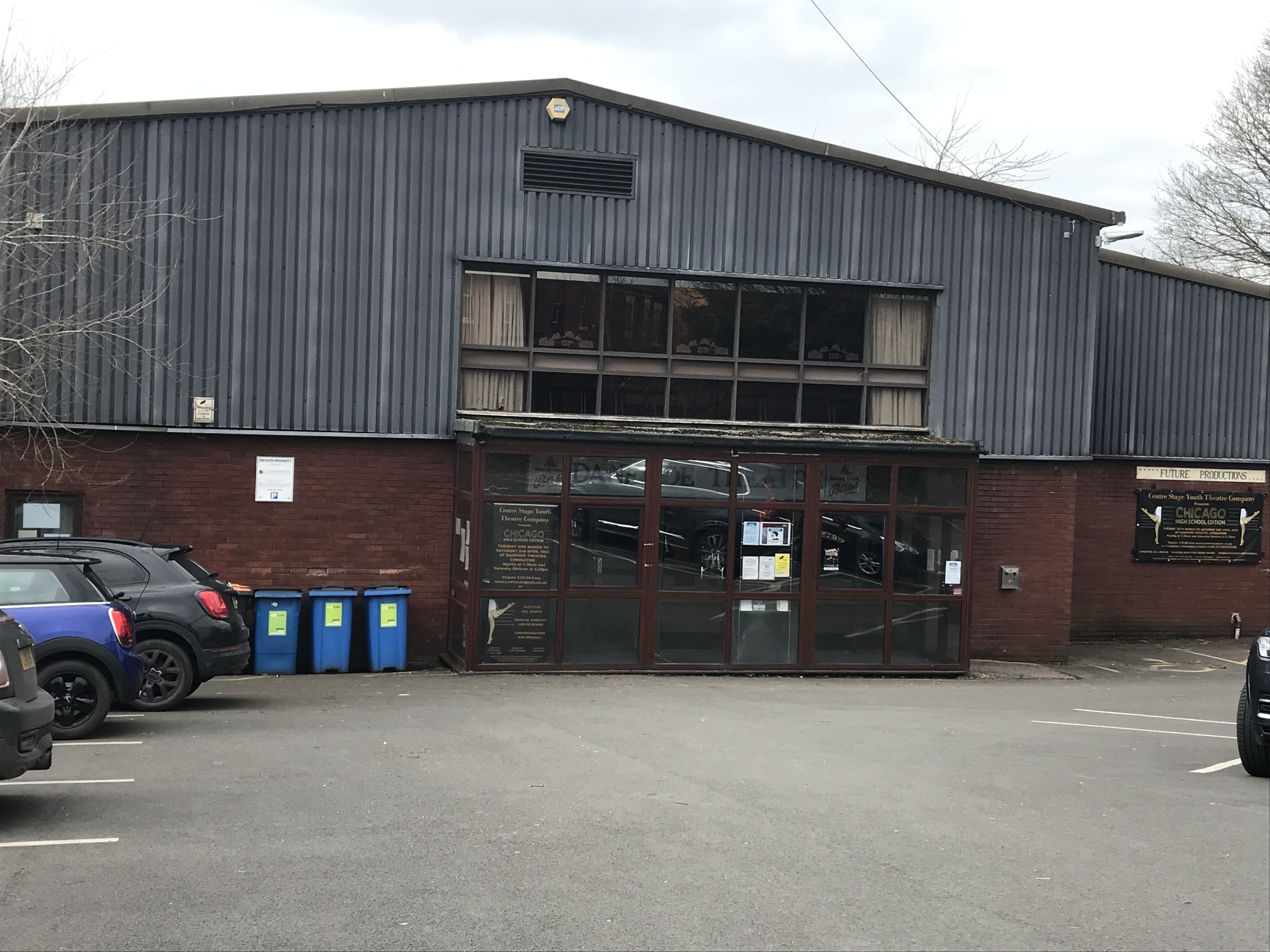
- Exterior of Daneside Theatre in March 2022
- Interactive map of Daneside Theatre
- Address: Congleton; United Kingdom
- Owner: Daneside Community Theatre Trust Limited
- Capacity: 300
- Type: Local

Construction
- Built: 1980-1984
- Opened: 3 October 1984; 41 years ago
- Renovated: 1997; 29 years ago
- Expanded: 2001; 25 years ago
- Cost: £198,000

Website
- Official website

Daneside Theatre is a theatre in the town of Congleton, Cheshire, England. It opened in 1984 and expanded in 2001. The theatre is used by several local dramatic and musical societies.

== History ==
Daneside Theatre was built in response to the closure of the Players Hall on Eaton’s bank that was used by the Congleton Players. The Players Hall was closed to allow for the construction of the Mountbatten Way inner relief road.

In 4 October 1980, the first sod was cut. The theatre was built by Daneside Theatre Trust Ltd. on top of the Congleton open-air swimming baths as part of the Daneside Leisure Development, which led to the closure of the swimming baths. The theatre cost £198,000 to build; some funding came from local townspeople who paid to have a seat named after a family member. The theatre officially opened on 3 October 1984 by the chairman of Congleton Inclosure trust, Jocelyn Solly.

The first production at Daneside Theatre was Curtain Up which featured various amateur theatrical groups in and around Congleton. In attendance were local members of parliament, mayors of both the Borough of Congleton and the town of Congleton, and other dignitaries.

A projector from Barclays Bank's training centre in Knutsford, which had recently switched to using video units for training, was donating to the theatre, which allowed for film screenings. The first movie to be screened at Daneside Theatre was Desperately Seeking Susan. Among the audience that night were the mayor of Congleton Borough, councillor Joe Alcock, and Congleton town mayor councillor Mike Kitton.

=== Refurbishment ===
Daneside Theatre was refurbished in 1997 at a cost of over £100,000. The refurbishment added a foyer and disabled toilets to the theatre, with a large amount of money coming from the estate of Jocelyn Solly.

=== Fire ===
The theatre was subject to an arson attack in 1998, when two storage containers outside the theatre were set alight. The props and scenery stored in the containers were destroyed. Firefighters were able to prevent the fire spreading between the burning containers and the theatre.

=== Expansion ===
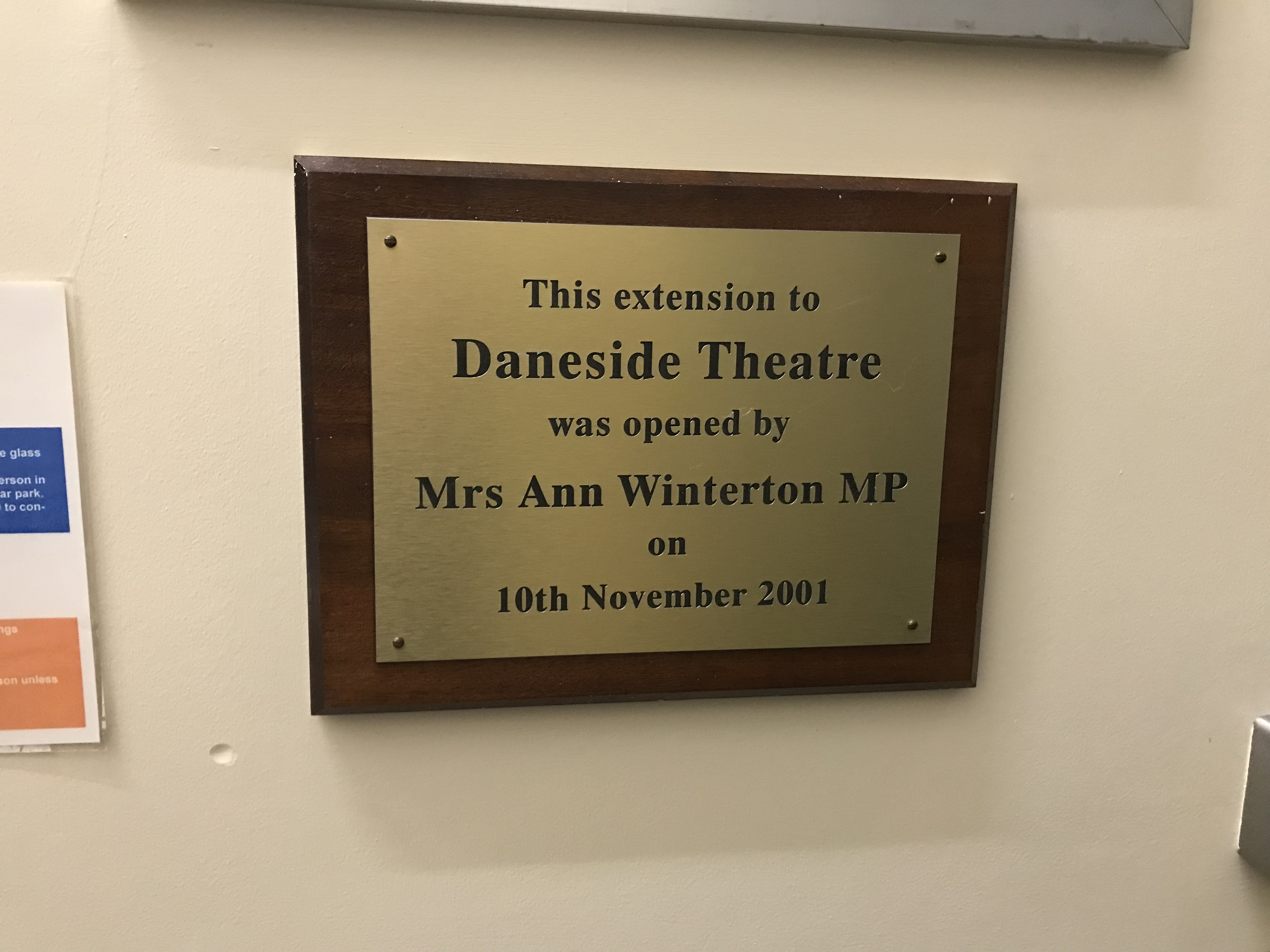
Plaque marking the date the expansion was opened

The building was expanded at a total cost of £238,000 in 2001, of which £56,775 came as a grant from the Arts Council of England, and some came though support other organisations, such as the Garfield Weston Foundation. The expansion added new rehearsal rooms, a meeting room, and extra storage space.

The expansion was opened by Ann Winterton, MP for Congleton, on 10 November 2001.

== Use by theatrical societies ==
The following theatrical societies use Daneside Theatre:

- Centre Stage Youth Theatre Company
- Congleton Amateur Youth Theatre
- Congleton Musical Theatre
- Congleton Pantomime
- Congleton Players Amateur Theatre Club
- Congleton Gang Show

The Congleton Gang Show was formed in 1972. The Congleton Gang Show performs one performance every two years at Daneside Theatre.

The Congleton Gang Show was formed as part of the 1972 Congleton charter year celebrations.

- Phoenix Theatre Company
- SOL Theatre School
- Trinity Amateur Operatic Society

== Awards ==
The following is a list of people linked to Daneside Theatre who have won awards.

- Annabelle Hull: Special Recognition Award (NODA District 8 2020 awards)
- Mavis Stoner: Special Recognition Award (NODA District 8 2020 awards)
- Sheila Rowley: Special Recognition Award (NODA District 8 2020 awards)
