= The Squad (TV series) =

- Genre: Teen drama
- Starring: Max Hafler; Mark Botham; Nicholas Cooke; Yvette Harris; Claire Walker; Tammi Jacobs; Leon Eagles; Michael Fox; Jamie Roberts; Sidney Livingstone
- Composers: David Rohl; Stuart J. Wolstenholme
- Country of origin: United Kingdom
- Original language: English
- No. of series: 1
- No. of episodes: 12

Production
- Producer: Pamela Lonsdale
- Running time: 25 minutes
- Production company: Thames Television

Original release
- Network: ITV
- Release: 1 October – 17 December 1980

The Squad is a British television teen drama series, broadcast on ITV, that ran for just a single series of twelve episodes from 1 October to 17 December 1980. The series follows the fictional exploits of a group of Metropolitan Police police cadets as they take part in various community related projects whilst learning the ropes to become fully fledged police officers. The series specifically focused on the activities of four cadets: Alan Martin, George Booker, Jogger Cummins and Sandra Henley. Coincidentally, actor Mark Botham, who played the role of cadet Alan Martin, later went on to appear as PC Danny Sparkes in the BBC police procedural TV series Juliet Bravo.

The series aired at 4.30pm on Wednesdays, and featured a team of high quality notable writers, including the likes of John Kershaw, Paula Milne, Roy Russell, Simon Masters, William Humble, Barry Purchese and James Follett. The series also featured early acting credits from the likes of Gary Beadle, Jesse Birdsall, Perry Fenwick, Rik Mayall, Caroline Quentin and Josette Simon. Notably, the series has never been released on VHS or DVD.

== Cast ==
- Max Hafler as George Booker
- Mark Botham as Alan Martin
- Nicholas Cooke as Jogger Cummins
- Yvette Harris as Sandra Henley
- Claire Walker as Elizabeth Maxwell
- Tammi Jacobs as Judy Banks
- Leon Eagles as Sgt. Lewis
- Michael Fox as Michael Stephens
- Jamie Roberts as Robby McLeod
- Sidney Livingstone as Sgt. Miles
- Terence Bayler as Commander Fenton
- Robert Daws as Mike Jenkins
- Stafford Gordon as Jim Allen
- Renny Lister as Eadie Booker
- Jonathan Newth as Insp. Williams
- Jeanne Watts as Insp. Morgan
- Jonathon Morris as Steve Parks

== Episodes ==
No.	Title	Directed by	Written by	Original release date
1	"New Boys"	Vic Hughes	John Kershaw	1 October 1980
2	"Search"	Paddy Russell	John Kershaw	8 October 1980
3	"Recruits"	Neville Green	John Kershaw	15 October 1980
4	"Rip-Off"	Brian Leanene	John Kershaw	22 October 1980
5	"Elizabeth"	Paddy Russell	Paula Milne	29 October 1980
6	"Wheels"	Richard Bramall	Roy Russell	5 November 1980
7	"Decoy"	Paddy Russell	Simon Masters	12 November 1980
8	"Mates"	Vic Hughes	William Humble	19 November 1980
9	"The Big Match"	Paddy Russell	Barry Purchese	26 November 1980
10	"Hit and Run"	Michael Kent	James Follett	3 December 1980
11	"Diplomatic Incident"	Brian Leanene	James Follett	10 December 1980
12	"Accident"	Brian Leanene	Nick McCarty	17 December 1980
