= Graham Bickley =

English actor and singer (born 1958)

- Born: Graham John Bickley; 18 May 1958 (age 68); Liverpool, England
- Occupation: Actor
- Years active: 1978–present
- Television: Bread (1989–91)
- Website: Official site

Graham John Bickley (born 18 May 1958) is an English actor and singer. He is best known for playing the role of Joey Boswell in Bread from 1989 until 1991, taking over from Peter Howitt, who originally portrayed the character from 1986 until 1989.

== Early life ==
Bickley was born into a Welsh family in Liverpool, England. His father was a primary school deputy headmaster and his mother was a special needs teacher. His older sister Susan Bickley is an opera singer with the English National Opera and the Welsh National Opera. Bickley and his sister first began singing in church as children, accompanied by their father on the organ. Bickley attended the Liverpool Blue Coat School, and studied at The Liverpool Theatre School.

== Career ==
Bickley made his West End theatre debut in 1981 in They're Playing Our Song. He went on to perform in the ensemble cast of the Pirates of Penzance in 1982. Since then, he has appeared in West End musicals such as Jukebox, Metropolis (1989), Which Witch (1992), Maddie (1997), The Pajama Game (Best Actor nomination, Toronto), Les Misérables (as Enjolras and Marius), Miss Saigon (as Chris), and Sunset Boulevard (as Joe, playing opposite Petula Clark). He played Tateh in the 2003 London premiere of Ragtime and was nominated for the Laurence Olivier and The Whatsonstage Award for Best Actor in a Musical.

In 1989, Bickley replaced Peter Howitt in the role of Joey Boswell on the BBC sitcom Bread. He played the role for three series, appearing in 35 episodes.

Bickley has also appeared in regional theatre productions, including Sleuth, No Trams to Lime Street (Best Actor nomination, Manchester), the UK première of I Love You, You're Perfect, Now Change and the world première of Black Goes With Everything. His revues include Jacques Brel is Alive and Well and Living in Paris and It's Better With a Band.

On the concert platform, Bickley has performed with orchestras throughout the United Kingdom, Europe and South America, including The Royal Liverpool Philharmonic, The London Symphony, The City of London Sinfonia, The National Symphony, The Northern Sinfonia, The Royal Scottish National, The Hallé, The City of Birmingham Symphony, The RTÉ Concert, The Gothenburg Symphony, The Iceland Symphony and The São Paulo Symphony. With conductor Carl Davis, Bickley performed a series of concerts with The Royal Liverpool Philharmonic, The Hallé, The City of Birmingham Symphony, the Bergen Philharmonic in Norway and the Royal Philharmonic Orchestra.

He has appeared in concert performances of Leonard Bernstein’s Wonderful Town playing the role of The Wreck with The Rotterdam Philharmonic, and Guys and Dolls, playing Nathan Detroit with The Vienna Konzerthaus, both conducted by Wayne Marshall. Bickley has also appeared in concert arena productions of Jesus Christ Superstar and Evita.

Bickley has also sung in the studio casts for Phantom of the Opera (1995) and Kiss Me, Kate (1996).

Bickley regularly appears with the BBC Concert Orchestra. His concerts include Guys and Dolls, playing Nathan Detroit, On The Town, playing Chip, and a new musical version of Peter Pan, all at The Royal Festival Hall and recorded for broadcast on BBC Radio. Other live concert performances for BBC Radio include Bitter Sweet, Radio Rhapsody, and Big Band Special with the BBC Big Band, and many appearances as guest vocalist on BBC Radio 2’s Friday Night is Music Night. In 2000, Bickley made his début at the BBC Promenade Concerts at The Royal Albert Hall, performing in Kurt Weill’s Street Scene and a 70th birthday tribute for Stephen Sondheim.

Bickley completed two seasons for Grange Park Opera: Billy Crocker in Cole Porter’s Anything Goes (2002), and Robert Baker in Leonard Bernstein’s Wonderful Town (2004).

He was a guest artist for a gala concert in Leeds with Lesley Garrett and the Opera North Orchestra, and with orchestrator Martin Koch, he produced a concert to celebrate the work of Nelson Riddle, with The BBC Concert Orchestra and transmitted live on BBC Radio 2.

Throughout 2005–06 Bickley undertook a national tour of Cole Porter’s High Society playing the role of C.K. Dexter Haven, culminating in a season at The Shaftesbury Theatre in the West End.

His concert engagements in 2007 included Good Thing Going, a celebration of the music of Stephen Sondheim at Cadogan Hall, and The Best of Broadway, two concerts at The Royal Albert Hall, both with the Royal Philharmonic Orchestra. He also performed in several gala concerts celebrating the music of Rodgers and Hammerstein, and was a special guest for Barbara Cook's 80th birthday concert at The London Coliseum: Barbara Cook and Friends.

In 2023, he toured the UK as Captain EJ Smith in Titanic the Musical.

He is a director of The Theatre Royal Drury Lane Theatrical Fund, founded in 1766.

== Personal life ==
Bickley has been married to playwright Peggy Riley since 2000.
