= Ronald Forfar =

British actor (1939–2020)

- Born: 6 January 1939; Liverpool, England
- Died: 28 September 2020 (aged 81); England
- Occupation: Actor

Ronald Forfar (6 January 1939 – 28 September 2020) was a British actor who appeared in many roles since the 1970s, including the role of Freddie Boswell in Carla Lane's comedy Bread.

== Biography ==
Ronald Forfar was born in January 1939 in Liverpool, Merseyside, England, UK. He was educated at Liverpool Collegiate, then was seven years in the Royal Navy before training at RADA from 1965 to 1967. He played a tragedian in Rosencrantz and Guildenstern Are Dead in 1966. Other parts include a tax inspector, Costello The Second, in Alan Bleasdale's The Muscle Market (a Boys from the Blackstuff prequel) and The Soothsayer in Herbert Wise's BBC television adaptation of Julius Caesar. Shakespearian roles include Bates in Henry V and First Officer in Laurence Olivier's version of King Lear.

Forfar also appeared in The Sweeney, Tutti Frutti, Chucklevision (as 'Professor Frimley'), The New Avengers and Graham Chapman's film Yellowbeard. He had three brothers, two of whom pre-deceased him.

In 2018 Ronald worked on what would be his last project, a short film called The All-Nighter, written and directed by Lee Phillips, and co-starring Erkan Mustafa and Martin Hancock.

Forfar died on 28 September 2020, at the age of 81.
