= Nick Conway =

English actor (born 1962)

- Born: Nicholas Campbell; 25 December 1962 (age 63); Shrewsbury, Shropshire, England
- Occupations: Actor, DJ,
- Years active: 1982–2014
- Television: Juliet Bravo (1982); Bread (1986–91); Doctors (2001); Coronation Street (1997, 2010)

Nick Conway (born Nicholas Campbell on 25 December 1962) is an English actor. He played Billy Boswell in Carla Lane's BBC comedy series Bread. He has also appeared in Starting Out, Thank You Mrs Clinkscales, When Saturday Comes, Coronation Street, Keep On Running Mr. Salter and Juliet Bravo.

He has featured in many theatre productions and currently runs a theatre school. He is also a DJ and teacher. In November 2010 he appeared on Coronation Street.

== Filmography ==
=== Film ===
| Year | Film | Role | Director | Notes |
|---|---|---|---|---|
| 1996 | When Saturday Comes | Brewery Worker | Maria Giese | |

=== Television ===
| Year | Title | Role | Notes |
|---|---|---|---|
| 1982 | Juliet Bravo | Gary | 3.07 "Nothing to Report" |
| 1983 | Seaview | Vernon | 1.06 "Band of Hope" |
| 1984 | Thank You, Mrs. Clinkscales | Ray | Television film |
| 1984 | Miracles Take Longer | Mark Terris | 2.01 "Episode One" |
| 1984 | Keep on Running | Alan Machin | Television film |
| 1984 | The Brief | Pte. James | 1.11 "Keys" |
| 1985 | The Practice | Nick Armstrong | 4 episodes |
| 1986 | Bluebell | Echo Reporter | 1.04 "Episode Four" |
| 1986 | Starting Out | Howie | 5.08 "Life and Death" |
| 1986-1991 | Bread | Billy Boswell | 74 episodes |
| 1987 | Ferry Aid: Let It Be | | Television special |
| 1997 | Sharpe's Justice | Sam West | Television film |
| 1997 | The Bill | Paul Kyle | 13.84 "Rift" |
| 1997 | Coronation Street | Mr. Jameson | 1.4316 "15 December 1997" |
| 2001 | Doctors | Douglas Fleming | 3.44 "A Whole Lot of Love" |
| 2010 | Coronation Street | Gavin | 1.7462 "5 November 2010" |
