= Police cadets in the United Kingdom =

Youth organisation of police in the United Kingdom

Volunteer Police Cadets (VPC) is a nationally recognised uniformed police youth organisation which operates in most parts of the United Kingdom. It is one of several cadet youth organisations including the Army Cadet Force, Sea Cadets, Royal Marine Cadets, Air Training Corps and Fire Cadets. The Police Cadets teach young people skills in policing, and some may assist police officers with low-risk activities. The purpose of the VPC is not to recruit police officers of the future, but to encourage the spirit of adventure and good citizenship among its members.

The Police Cadets were founded in their current form by the Metropolitan Police Service in 1988 and are organised based on the territorial police forces. Membership is open to youths aged 13–18, and some branches include Junior Volunteer Police Cadets for those aged 10–13. Though advertised as giving an "insight" into British policing, it does not guarantee future employment.

The aims of the VPC are:

- To promote a practical understanding of policing among all young people.
- To encourage the spirit of adventure and good citizenship.
- To support local policing priorities through volunteering and give young people a chance to be heard.
- To inspire young people to participate positively in their communities.

== History ==
Police cadets were introduced in 1948, consisting of full-time frontline employees who were aged 16–19; changes were made to the new system in 1959. These police cadets had no powers of arrest but were able to assist their senior colleagues in many practical matters, such as taking statements, directing traffic, or offering crime prevention advice, as well as observing the work of their supervisors. In the late 1960s, police cadet training was revised and a national programme of intensive 10 month residential cadet training was introduced. The courses provided cadets with a mix of academic training together with outward bound, orienteering, self defence, swimming (life saving training at Bronze Medallion level and above), martial arts (e.g., judo) and other sporting activity training (e.g., including competitive inter-force Under 19 football, athletics, swimming and rugby tournaments). Military standard drill training was also a feature of cadet training. On reaching the age of 19 (reduced to 18 years 6 months in the mid-1970s), on completion of both residential and local divisional/departmental training, successful cadets were then appointed as probationary police constables and continuing their training as such for a further two years. Most forces disbanded cadet training by the early 1990s. Cadets were paid a full time wage for the period of their training, with deductions towards the cost of their residential training taken from their monthly pay. Periods served as police cadets did not count towards Police Service for long service awards or pension purposes.

=== Metropolitan Police ===
The Metropolitan Police was one of the first to introduce a cadet corps or force in 1948, intended to boost then-low recruitment levels (it was then 3,000 below its 'establishment' figure of 28,000, with officers working two of their monthly 'rest days' and being paid for this work). Granted its first commandant Andrew Croft in 1960, the Metropolitan Police Cadet Corps or Force was based originally in the former RAF Hendon buildings on Aerodrome Road and police cadets were all male aged 16 to 19 and they were paid a salary. They initially served two 'school terms' at Hendon and then transferred to another establishment at Ashford Kent until the first 'term' after their 18th birthday when they were attached to one of four Cadet Centres at Kingsbury, Sunbury, Norwood and Wanstead.

In 1968 the Hendon Police Cadet College opened on the corner of Aerodrome Road and Colindale Avenue almost directly opposite the gates to RAF Hendon. This was part of a wider transformation of the former RAF Hendon, with a new housing estate begun in 1970 and the new Peel Centre opened for police training in 1974. Serving cadets from the Metropolitan Police, Kent Police and Royal Ulster Constabulary, the new Cadet College building consisted of a purpose-built gymnasium, four accommodation blocks and an administration and training building. There was a large parade ground for the cadets to practice their drill.

In 1980 the ITV television network aired The Squad, a drama series which followed the fictional adventures of Metropolitan Police Cadets. The twelve episodes were produced by Thames Television.

=== 1988 – Present form ===
The present form of police cadets began in 1988. It was a community initiative that was supported by Commissioner Peter Imbert, who wanted to engage with young people. The first documented Volunteer Police Cadet unit started in South Norwood (Lambeth) in March 1988. This unit later moved to Paul Breen Section House in Sydenham and becoming known as 4 Area Cadets and then later becoming Lewisham Volunteer Police Cadets when policing aligned to London boroughs in the early 2000’s.

== Organisation ==
All of the territorial police forces of England and Wales have a corresponding VPC branch, as does the British Transport Police. These are subdivided into local branches. There is a separate but similar scheme in Scotland called the Police Scotland Youth Volunteers, but no equivalent scheme exists in Northern Ireland.

The VPC is supported by a team, led by Chief Constable Shaun Sawyer of Devon & Cornwall Police. The team have developed the National Police Chiefs' Council supported framework, sharing the common Aims and Principles of the VPC programmes operating in police forces across the UK.

They support the VPC through funding; developing resources and training; producing opportunities for cadets and leaders. Sharing good practice amongst VPC members ensures police engagement and education of cadets, recognising the role of young people within their communities and policing.

=== Activities ===
Units normally meet at a local school or community venue once a week and are led by police officers, police staff and volunteers. In addition cadets develop their leadership skills by undertaking challenging social action projects in their communities with an expectation that they will volunteer three hours a month. Examples of these projects include supporting older members of the community in understanding cybercrime, fundraising for charities and road safety campaigns.

Cadets learn about:

- Drill,
- Citizenship,
- Police powers and procedures,
- First aid,
- Leadership skills,

VPC teams also take part in many events and activities in their communities, such as the London Marathon, Notting Hill Carnival, Remembrance Sunday and Armed Forces Day parades.

Cadets also take part in the Duke of Edinburgh's Award (DofE) and from 2019 will have the opportunity to participate in the UK Youth Achievement Awards.

Police Cadets have no special powers. Unlike the previous full-time cadets, they rarely assist the police in actual policing activities, and are never sent to high-risk situations. However, it has been hinted that they have Police Staff powers by the official MPS VPC social account, but no legal document supports this.

Once they reach the age of 14, cadets may go out in public with police officers to take part in low-risk policing activities. Undercover cadets have been used to test if shops are willing to sell alcohol, tobacco, vapes and weapons to underage customers. They may also assist policing at large public events and provide crime prevention advice to local residents and businesses. Cadets can also be used to support local, proactive policing.

=== Uniform ===
There is no standardised uniform for the police cadets, with each parent police service providing their own uniform design. Generally, the uniforms avoid bearing too much resemblance to the uniforms of police officers, police community support officers, and other enforcement officers. They have tended to use badged polo shirts, a formal uniform shirt (which could be white or blue) with epaulettes bearing VPC insignia or cadet rank bars, and a beret, peaked cap, or baseball cap. Cadets are also issued with trousers and a fleece or coat.

Police cadets are issued with their uniform and do not have to finance any part of it. After they leave the VPC, uniform should be returned to stores.

Some cadets wear black ties and wear a brassard on their right arm. Other forces issue their VPCs with a light blue or red tie.

In Cambridgeshire, cadets usually wear a black polo shirt (and fleece depending on conditions), trousers and boots, with the force crest on the upper left side of the polo shirt and fleece; on certain occasions, a white long- or short-sleeve shirt is worn with a light blue tie and epaulettes (embroidered with "Volunteer Police Cadet"); when outdoors, a black peaked cap with a blue band is worn (the same as PCSOs) - female cadets used to be issued with similar bowler hats. However, in Sussex their uniform is similar to a police officer's, with white shirt, tie, epaulettes, black trousers, and black shoes. They also have cadet jackets and a high visibility jacket. In Hertfordshire, cadets were issued with a light blue V-neck sweater, which had the county emblem embroidered on it. The Hertfordshire scheme has now changed and cadets wear a uniform similar to regular police officers, but with the word "cadet" embroidered on epaulette rank slides instead of a collar number and similarly the word "cadet" on the left breast reflective strip instead of the word "police". In South Yorkshire, their cadets uniform is quite similar to Cambridgeshire, wearing a black polo shirt, a white long/short sleeve shirt, a black tie instead of blue, and epaulettes stating "POLICE CADET", or "SENIOR POLICE CADET" embroidered depending on how long you have served for. They also have the same hats, being a blacked peak hat with the crest and a blue band (similar to PCSOs), with similar bowler hats.

== Ranks ==
The highest rank is Head Police Cadet, with a Head Police Cadet normally having two deputies to assist them and temporarily act as their replacement if necessary. A Head Police Cadet is akin to a Chief Constable in a structural sense as the Head Police Officer and is often viewed as ‘the Chief Cadet’ and a potential future Chief Constable.

Ranks within Volunteer Police Cadet schemes vary considerably across Great Britain. Cadets appointed Mayor's Cadets are given a special badge or epaulettes to wear.

Cadet Ranks and Insignia
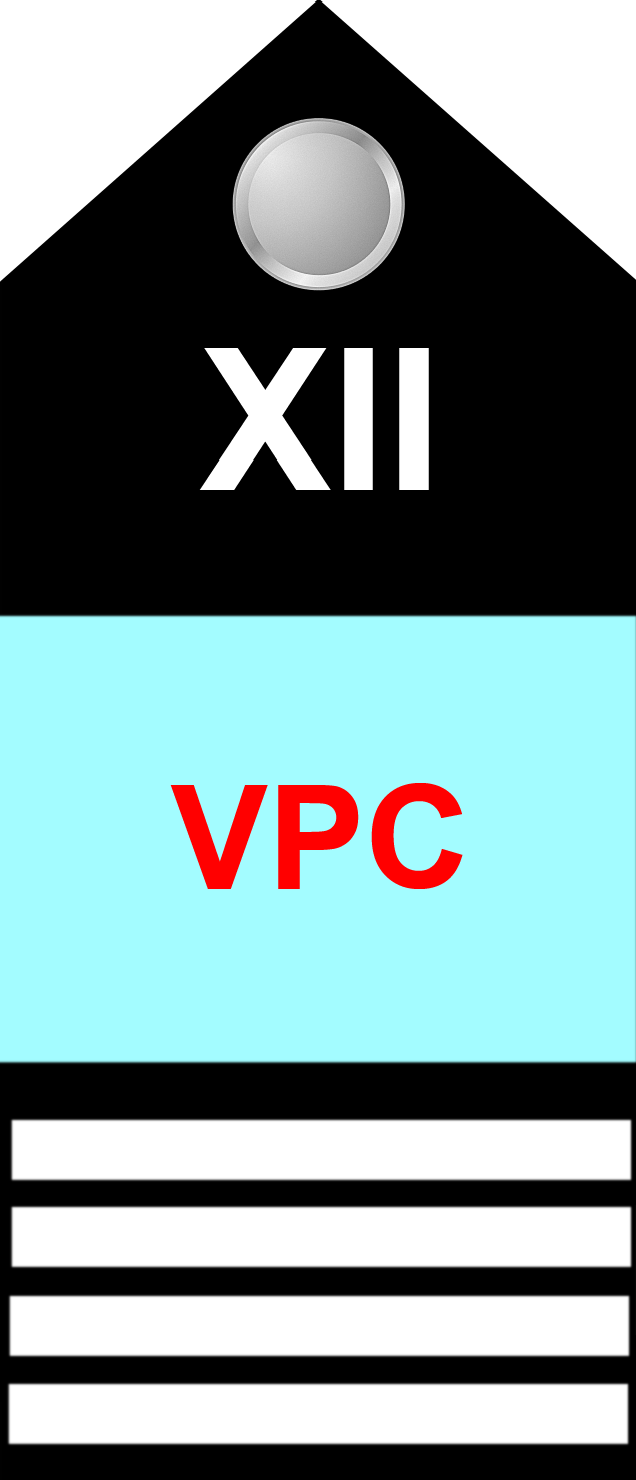
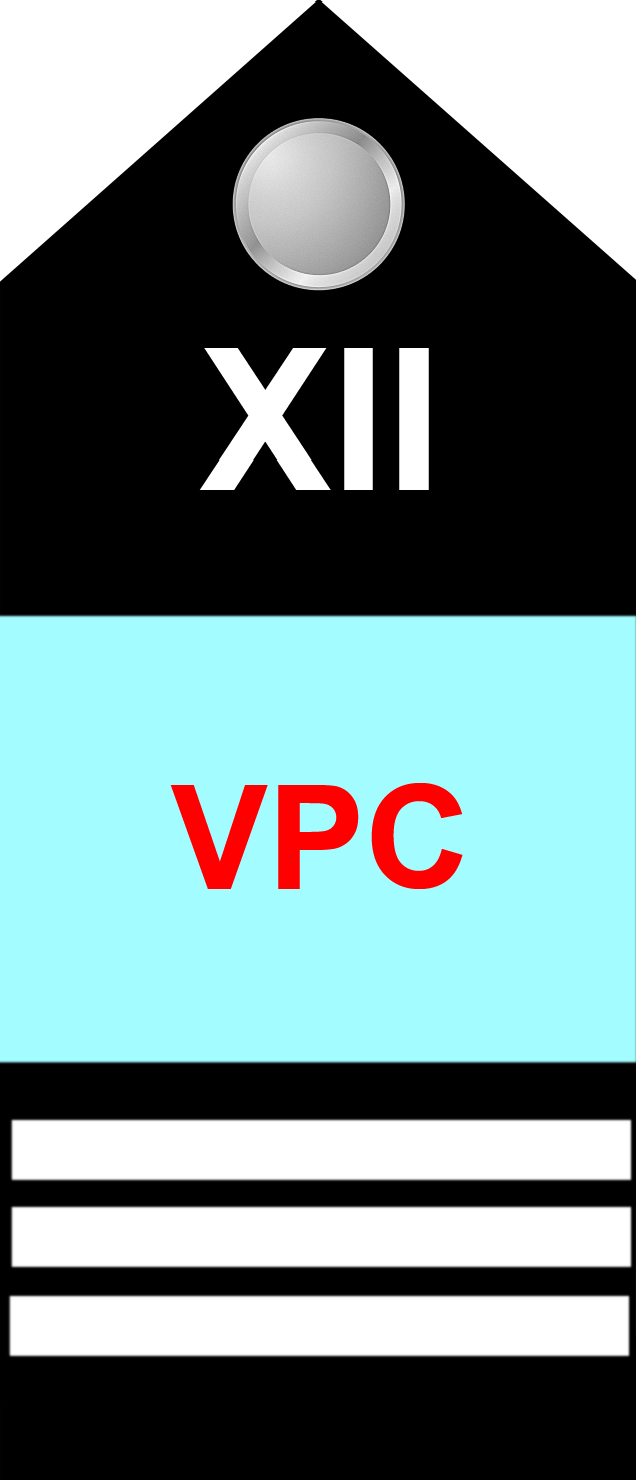
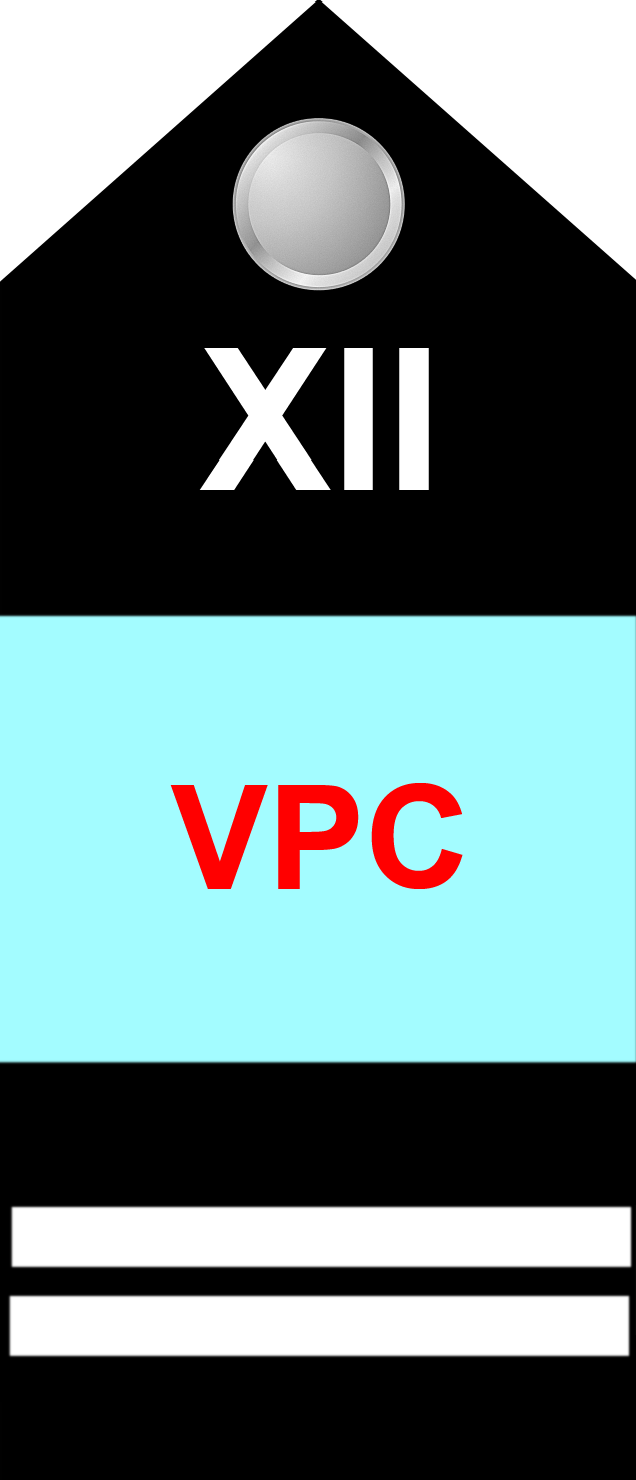
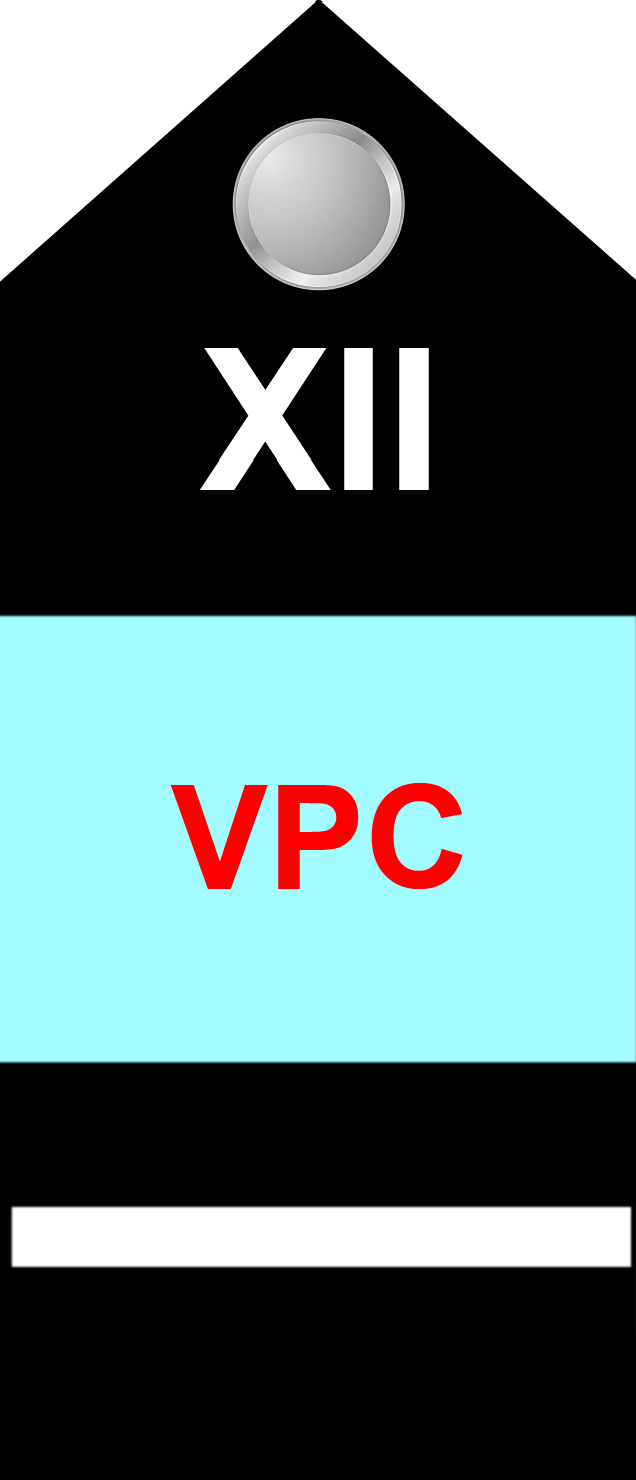
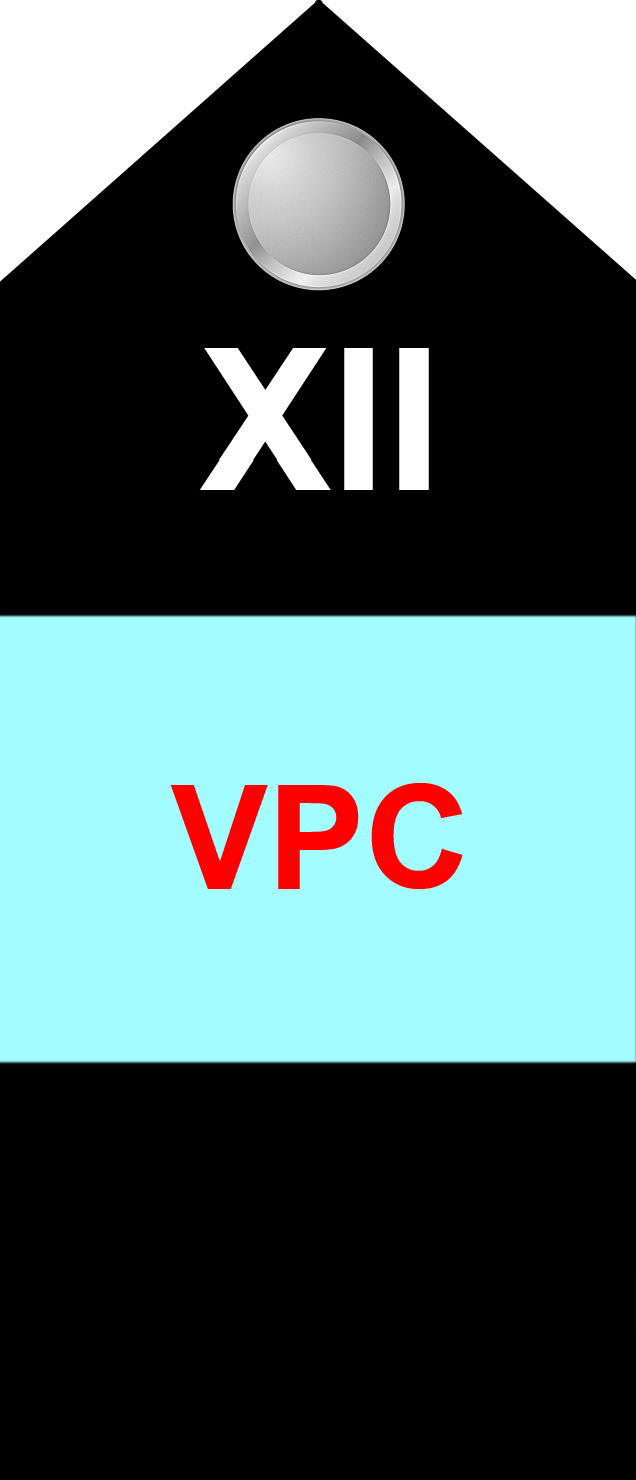
Cadet service	Cadet under officers	Cadet senior NCOs				Cadet junior NCOs		Cadets	Recruits
Metropolitan volunteer police cadets
Metropolitan volunteer police cadets									No insignia
Metropolitan volunteer police cadets	No equivalent	Head cadet	No equivalent	Deputy head cadet	No equivalent	Team leader cadet	Deputy team leader cadet	Police cadet	Recruit
Metropolitan volunteer police cadets	No equivalent	HCdt	No equivalent	DHCdt	No equivalent	TLCdt	DTLCdt	Cdt	Rct
Hampshire volunteer police cadets
Hampshire volunteer police cadets									No insignia
Hampshire volunteer police cadets	No equivalent	Head cadet	No equivalent	Deputy head cadet	No equivalent	Team leader cadet	No equivalent	Police cadet	Recruit
Hampshire volunteer police cadets	No equivalent	HCdt	No equivalent	DHCdt	No equivalent	TLCdt	No equivalent	Cdt	Rct

The epaulette is arranged in the order:

- Epaulette pin
- Phonetic code of the London Borough
- V.P.C band (light blue, placed through epaulette)
- Metal bar ( distinguishes rank )

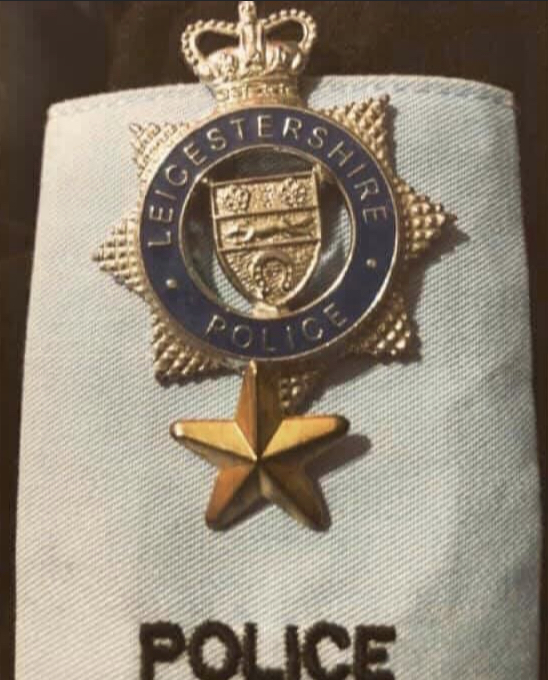
Leicestershire Police head police cadet epaulette

The Volunteer Police Cadets have a few positions above the V.P.C standard ranks for people over the age of 18, such as:

- V.P.C Supervisor Band – Over 18s who still want to assist in Cadets as Volunteer Police Cadet Leaders
- V.P.C Staff Band – For actively serving police officers who wear the V.P.C Uniform, which is fairly uncommon

=== Hampshire Constabulary ===
The Hampshire Constabulary Volunteer Police Cadet programme is divided into units consisting of around thirty cadets with a head cadet, deputy head cadet and team leaders. The rank insignia is worn on epaulettes on the shirts for formal occasions or ironed onto polo shirts which are used for less formal occasions. In 2018, Hampshire, Thames Valley Police, Sussex and Surrey standardised on uniforms and rank slides within the Southeast region.

=== Leicestershire Police ===
Lord Lieutenant Cadet is the highest achieving rank to get, however it is very hard to achieve. Followed on by High Sheriff cadet, head cadet then deputy head cadet. Each unit will have one Head Cadet, supported by 2 Deputy Head Cadets.

Every year ranks High Sheriff Cadet and Lord Lieutenant Cadet are awarded to certain cadets following a decision by unit leader.

=== Thames Valley Police ===
In Thames Valley Police, the ranks are as follows: Cadet, Team Leader, Deputy Head Cadet, and Head Cadet.

=== Bedfordshire Police ===
In Bedfordshire Police, the ranks are as follows: Cadet, Drill Cadet, Head Cadet, High Sheriff Cadet and Lord Lieutenant Cadet. Ranks are distinguished by metal bars (Two for Head Cadets and One for Drill Cadet) on epaulettes but previously it was stars with Drill Cadet having silver stars and Head Cadet having gold. Lord lieutenant cadet is the highest achieving rank to get, however it is very hard to achieve along with the High Sheriff cadet, These roles are picked by instructors along with the Lord Lieutenant (For the Lord Lieutenant cadet) and the High Sheriff (For the High Sheriff cadet). There are two Head and Drill cadets for the north and south of the county.

In late 2022, a new rank was introduced called Cadet Council where two cadets, two from north and two from south, will join into cadet instructor meetings and give the cadets a voice.

All of these roles' occupants change yearly.

== Branches ==
=== Scotland ===
The equivalent of the police cadets in Scotland is the Police Scotland Youth Volunteers (PSYV). The PSYV is not part of the Volunteer Police Cadets framework, but is listed as a partner agency and carries out similar work.

Established in 2013 with five groups in Aberdeen, Cumnock, Dundee, Edinburgh and Glasgow, PSYV members volunteered at the 2014 Commonwealth Games in Glasgow and other public events. The programme has quickly expanded and today there are now twenty groups across Scotland from Stranraer to Shetland, with plans to expand further.

=== London ===
The founder and the largest cadet scheme are operated by the Metropolitan Police Service, with over 5,000 cadets as of March 2016. It was founded in 1988 by Commissioner Peter Imbert. By 2010, every London borough had a VPC unit, along with a central support team within the Territorial Policing Command Unit. Metropolitan Police Cadets are involved in continuing further education, DofE, learning about the police service, carrying out attachments to divisions and specialist departments, learning first aid, and engaging in community work projects with the disabled and disadvantaged. London Police cadets annually compete in a police scenario completion, which was traditionally held in Hendon, in North London, for the annual Police Cadet Competition. This involved cadets competing in a range of police activities and scenarios, in which they were competitively assessed. In 2015 the Metropolitan Police announced that the Cadet Competition was no longer to be held at Hendon due to the resizing of Hendon; some of the land was sold off for development. However, the Annual Cadet Competition continues a long tradition at the Gravesend public order site. 2013 also saw the launch of Junior Police Cadets, which accepts young people from school Year 6 to Year 9, at which point they become eligible to join the senior VPC.

On Sunday 14 June 2009, the Metropolitan Police Volunteer Police Cadets took part in what is believed to have been the largest ever formal parade of young people, to celebrate the 22nd anniversary of the establishment of the Volunteer Police Cadet force in what was named as the "colour parade" and was carried out on Horse Guard's Parade. Each cadet troop was formally passed a Standard (flag) under the review of the Metropolitan Police Commissioner, Sir Paul Stephenson, and other senior officers of the Metropolitan Police. The parade also included the showing of vintage police vehicles, police dogs, and a static display of the Boys' Brigade's London Massed Bugle Band. Bands that lead the four columns of a total of 1,400 cadets (and various police cadet staff, most of whom also hold different roles within the Metropolitan Police) were Metropolitan Police Pipe Band, the Nottingham-shire Police Pipe Band, the British Airways Brass Band, and the Enfield District Scout Band.

In 2011, Mayor Boris Johnson supported expanding the Metropolitan Police VPC by calling for numbers to be doubled by 2015. The Metropolitan Police VPC changed the age range from 14–19 to 10–24, introducing the UK's first Junior Volunteer Police Cadets scheme. The expansion target was achieved in March 2016.

=== Schemes in operation ===
- Avon and Somerset Police
- Bedfordshire Police
- British Transport Police - One cadet unit in London (Islington)
- Cambridgeshire Constabulary - Six Cadet Units: Peterborough, Fenland, East Cambs, Cambridge City, Huntingdon, St. Neots.
- Cheshire Police
- City of London Police
- Cumbria Police
- Derbyshire Constabulary
- Devon and Cornwall Police
- Dyfed-Powys Police
- Essex Police
- Gloucestershire Police
- Greater Manchester Police
- Hampshire Constabulary
- Hertfordshire Constabulary
- Humberside Police
- Isle of Man Police
- Kent Police – Seven Cadet Units: Canterbury, Dover, Maidstone, Tonbridge and Medway, Gravesend, Swanley
- Lancashire Police
- Leicestershire Police
- Lincolnshire Police
- Merseyside Police – Force-wide in April 2006. Operates seven scheme across Merseyside
- Metropolitan Police – Operates thirty-two schemes across the Greater London area and Junior Cadets (yr6-yr8).
- Norfolk Police - Operates 7 teams in Aylsham, Swaffham, Great Yarmouth, Kings Lynn, North Walsham, Norwich and Wymondham
- Northamptonshire Police
- Northumbria Police
- North Wales Police – Force-wide in June 2007
- North Yorkshire Police – Starting in March 2015 as a two-year trial
- Nottinghamshire Police – Trial scheme of 70 cadets in 2013, plans for expansion 2014
- Police Scotland
- South Yorkshire Police – Operates four schemes in Barnsley, Doncaster, Rotherham and Sheffield.
- Suffolk Police - Operates 8 units in Martlesham, Ipswich, Bury St Edmunds, Lowestoft, Sudbury, Haverhill, Mildenhall and Stowmarket
- Surrey Police
- Sussex Police
- Staffordshire Police
- Thames Valley Police
- Warwickshire Police
- West Mercia Police
- West Midlands Police
- Wiltshire Police
- Gwent Police

== Investigations into abuse ==
Accusations of sexual abuse of Cadets by Police have led to investigations in the Metropolitan Police and Greater Manchester Police.

== See also ==
- Police support volunteer
- Police community support officer
- Special Constabulary

Other UK Cadet Organisations

- Air Training Corps
- Army Cadet Force
- Sea Cadet Corps
  - Royal Marines Cadets
- Volunteer Cadet Corps
- Combined Cadet Force
- Girls Venture Corps Air Cadets
- Saint John Ambulance Cadets
- Fire Cadets
