= Bread (TV series) =

British TV sitcom (1986–1991)

- Elswick Street: Where the exterior shots were filmed.
- Created by: Carla Lane
- Written by: Carla Lane
- Directed by: Susan Belbin (1986–1988); Robin Nash (1987–1989); John B. Hobbs (1990–1991)
- Starring: Jean Boht; Peter Howitt; Nick Conway; Victor McGuire; Jonathon Morris; Gilly Coman; Kenneth Waller; Ronald Forfar; Bryan Murray; J. G. Devlin; Graham Bickley; Melanie Hill; Deborah Grant; Pamela Power
- Opening theme: David Mackay
- Country of origin: United Kingdom
- Original language: English
- No. of series: 7
- No. of episodes: 74 (list of episodes)

Production
- Executive producer: Robin Nash (1986–1991)
- Producers: Robin Nash (1986–1991); John B. Hobbs (1990–1991)
- Production locations: Dingle, Liverpool, England
- Editors: John Dunstan (1986–1991); Chris Wadsworth (1987)
- Camera setup: Multi-camera
- Running time: 30 mins
- Production company: BBC

Original release
- Network: BBC1
- Release: 1 May 1986 – 3 November 1991

Bread is a British television sitcom, written and created by Carla Lane, about a close-knit, working-class family in Liverpool, England. It was produced by the BBC and screened on BBC1 from 1 May 1986 to 3 November 1991. In 1988, the ratings for the series peaked at 21 million viewers.

== Plot summary ==
The series focused on the extended Boswell family of Liverpool, in the district of Dingle. The family were Catholic and working class, and led by the acid-tongued matriarch Nellie Boswell (Jean Boht) who ruled over her family with an iron fist. Early series focused on her children attempting to make enough money (in slang, "bread") to support the family through various illicit means., whilst at the same time often indulging in benefit fraud. Later series saw less emphasis on moneymaking schemes, and more storylines focusing on the characters' love lives and marriages.

== Characters ==
The Boswell family consisted of Nellie's philandering, free-spirited husband Freddie (Ronald Forfar) who spent most of the series with one foot in the family household, and the other with his mistress, the red-haired Irish siren Lilo Lil (Eileen Pollock). This union led to one of the series' most famous catchphrases, which Nellie frequently declared about Lilo Lil in a storm of rage: "She is a tart!"

Eldest child Joey (Peter Howitt/Graham Bickley) was essentially the level-headed household head, with his leather trousers, classic Jaguar, and charming demeanour ("Greetings!" was his catchphrase), Joey was involved in tax fraud after making a fortune selling personalised number plates and not declaring this to the taxman. Throughout the series, Joey was in love with dour, demanding divorcee Roxy (Joanna Phillips-Lane), whom he finally married in the final series. The character was extremely popular for the first four series, and Peter Howitt was considered the series' heartthrob and breakthrough star. When he decided to leave Bread to concentrate on directing and other acting opportunities, his replacement was not as popular with viewers, so the character wasn't as prominent in the later series.

Second-eldest child Jack was the thoughtful, sensitive type who ran an antique-dealing business, often with disastrous results. Actor Victor McGuire was absent in series 4, and Jack went to America for a year. He returned in series 5 and eventually fell in love with an older woman, Leonora (Deborah Grant), who moved in across the road. Adrian (Jonathon Morris) was the theatrical poet, who had his poetry published ('My Granny's Bucket'). His real name was Jimmy, but he changed his name to Adrian which he considered "less common". He endured relationships with several highly-sexed women and was frequently seen emerging red-faced from the bushes. The youngest Boswell son, Billy (Nick Conway), was loud-mouthed, annoying, and immature. He somehow managed to father Francesca with his miserable mistress Julie (Caroline Milmoe/Hilary Crowson) who lived across the road. Billy married Julie in series 3, but they were divorced by series 5, and Julie moved to Sefton Park (and left the series), leaving Billy devastated. Billy drove an old Volkswagen Beetle which constantly backfired when driven, as well as a van from the back of which he sold sandwiches.

The only Boswell daughter was Aveline (Gilly Coman/Melanie Hill), a colourful, enduring model who married Protestant vicar Oswald Carter (Giles Watling) at the end of series 4 (to staunchly-Catholic Nellie's outrage and who she would refer to as "The Proddy Vicar"); after trying to conceive throughout series 5, Aveline gives birth to Ursula in series 6.

Next door is grumpy, permanently-hungry Grandad (Kenneth Waller). The series doesn't make explicitly-clear whether he is Nellie's or Freddie's father, as he is only ever referred to and called Grandad. However, in a fleeting sequence in a series-4 episode, Freddie is arrested for stealing his rubbish cart. When the family arrive at the Police Station to collect him, Nellie refers to Freddie as Grandad's son-in-law for the only time, confirming that he is, in fact, her own father. In later series we are told Grandad's name is William Duvall and Nellie refers to her maiden name of Duvall. This confirms that Grandad was Nellie's father. He appeared in all seven series and was in the last episode's final scene, alongside Jean Boht. Grandad was frequently seen telling people to "Piss off!" and reminiscing about his childhood sweetheart Edie Matteson. Grandad speaks in a noticeable Lancashire accent rather than his family's distinctively Liverpudlian tones, suggesting that the Duvall clan may originate outside of Liverpool.

There are also several notable supporting characters seen throughout the series: the deadpan Department of Health and Social Security clerk Martina (Pamela Power) spent all seven series enduring the various tales the Boswells spun to get more dole money. She perfected her catchphrase "Next!" but ultimately failed to snare her favourite Boswell, 'Shifty' (Bryan Murray), after several attempts at a relationship with him. Shifty arrived in series 4, ostensibly to cover Jack's absence in the series, but he stayed on in Bread after Jack's return and lived next door with Grandad until the end of the sixth series.

Other neighbours include Celia Higgins, played by Rita Tushingham during series 4; in series 6 and 7, Leonora Campbell (Deborah Grant) moved into Julie's old house and eventually began dating Jack. The Boswells had a mongrel dog as a pet, called Mongy, who was run over and killed in one episode, leading to the family scattering his ashes into the Mersey.

The show's title is a reference to "bread" meaning "money"; though this is not a Liverpudlian Scouse expression but cockney rhyming slang ("bread and honey"). Liverpudlians at the time largely referred to money as "dough". A regular scenario in each episode was that of Nellie opening a cockerel-fashioned kitchen egg-basket prior to the evening meal into which the family would place money for their upkeep. The amount of money placed in the pot by each depended on how successful a day they'd had. The pot would be at the forefront of the screen at the end of each episode as the credits rolled.

Other frequently-seen scenarios included Nellie answering a cordless phone (a newfangled item in the mid-1980s) which she kept in the pocket of her pinny (she always said "Hello, yes?" when answering, followed by a series of frantic "Thank you"s when it was Derek (Peter Byrne), Nellie's secret park-bench pal, on the other end); also ensuring the parking places outside the terraced house were kept free for the family's many vehicles, by putting out illicitly-acquired police traffic cones.

The show featured soap opera-style cliffhangers, meaning that viewers had to watch each week to see how the previous week's cliffhanger would be resolved. This also meant that each episode was not self-contained, but the plot unfolded as the series progressed. This was unusual for a comedy at the time, but has been used to great effect by comedies since.

== Cast ==
=== Regular characters ===
Actor	Role	Episodes	Duration	Years
Jean Boht	Nellie Boswell	74	1–7	1986–1991
Ronald Forfar	Freddie Boswell	62	1–1990 Christmas Special	1986–1990
Peter Howitt	Joey Boswell	39	1–1988 Christmas Special	1986–1988
Graham Bickley	Joey Boswell	35	5–7	1989–1991
Victor McGuire	Jack Boswell	61	1–3, 5–7	1986–87, 1989–1991
Jonathon Morris	Adrian Boswell	74	1–7	1986–1991
Gilly Coman	Aveline Boswell	39	1–1988 Christmas Special	1986–1988
Melanie Hill	Aveline Boswell	35	5–7	1989–1991
Nick Conway	Billy Boswell	74	1–7	1986–1991
Kenneth Waller	Grandad, William Duvall	73	1–7	1986–1991
Bryan Murray	Cousin Shifty	49	4–1990 Christmas Special	1988–1990
Pamela Power	Martina	37	1–6	1986–1990
Eileen Pollock	Lilo Lil	43	3–7	1987–1991
Joanna Phillips-Lane	Roxy	19	3–7	1987–1991
Caroline Milmoe	Julie Jefferson	12	1–2	1986–1987
Hilary Crowson	Julie Jefferson	41	3–1989 Christmas Special	1987–1989
Giles Watling	Oswald Carter	49	4–7	1988–1991
Rita Tushingham	Celia Higgins	11	4	1988
Deborah Grant	Leonora Campbell	19	6–7	1990–1991

=== Guest appearances ===
- Linda McCartney was friends with writer Carla Lane and had a guest appearance in series 4, episode 7 (1988). Her husband Paul appeared briefly at the end of the episode.
- Singer Sonia Evans also appeared series 4, episode 11 (1988) as Ellia, a girlfriend of Adrian Boswell.
- Supporting characters Yizzel and a friend of Yizzel's (credited as Yizzel's Mate) were played by Charles Lawson and Simon Rouse from 1986 to 1989.

== Episodes ==
Series	Original broadcast dates
1	1 May–5 June 1986
2	8 January–19 February 1987
3	6 September–29 November 1987
4	18 September–11 December 1988
Christmas special	25 December 1988
5	10 September–3 December 1989
Christmas special	25 December 1989
6	2 September–4 November 1990
Christmas special	25 December 1990
7	1 September–3 November 1991

== Spin-offs ==
The theme tune was sung by the cast members and was released on BBC Records but failed to make the UK singles chart. The theme was re-recorded for the fifth series of the show, due to BBC1's transition from mono to NICAM stereo sound – the original theme had been recorded in mono – and also to allow Graham Bickley and Melanie Hill, who joined the cast in Series 5 replacing the original Joey and Aveline, respectively, to replace the originals in the vocals.

A comic strip based on the series featured in the BBC's Teen magazine Fast Forward, although the overall tone was altered for the magazines younger readership, and most of the featured stories were of a generic nature, not following the continuity of the television series and mostly just using the characters to tell simple joke stories .

After the series had finished, a stage play of the show entitled "Bread – The Farewell Slice" toured the UK.

Also following the end of the series, Jonathon Morris announced his desire for a follow-up series about his character, theatrical poet Adrian, feeling that the character 'had a lot of potential and a lot of stories yet to tell beyond the Bread setting', and suggested the premise of Adrian moving down to London in hopes of cracking the bigger theatrical scene. He proposed his idea to the BBC and even announced his hopes for the series during an appearance in March 1991 on Saturday morning programme Going Live! as filming for the final series of Bread was drawing to a close. The BBC declined on the suggestion; Morris went on to co-write a one-man play based around Adrian which he intended to tour with, and also in hope of using it as an example to the BBC of what could be done with the character. The project was eventually dropped, due to ownership rights for the character with Carla Lane. However, the effort was not completely detrimental to Morris, as his enthusiasm led to Going Live! host Phillip Schofield recommending Morris for his replacement as presenter for Children's BBC series The Movie Game, a position which Morris went on to fill.

== Criticism ==
Though the show was popular, and received audiences more than 21 million, Bread was criticised for mocking Liverpudlian culture and people, who had suffered significant economic downturn and unemployment in the 1980s. Lane countered these criticisms saying that her characters were cartoonish and one-dimensional, and were not intended to be a serious social comment on the state of Liverpool.

== DVD releases ==
In the UK, the first four series were released in two 3-DVD sets in 2003. However, the first series' episodes had some, but not all, profanity bleeped out or muted. A 16-DVD "Complete Collection" followed in 2014, containing all 74 episodes and the three Christmas specials. This time, episodes from series three onwards and the specials were uncensored but the first two series consisted of the previously released censored discs.

In Australia, only the first 5 seasons have been released so far and it is unknown if the remaining seasons will follow.

UK Region 2

- Series 1 & 2 – 17 March 2003
- Series 3 & 4 – 2 June 2003
- The Complete Collection (Series 1–8) – 29 September 2014
- The Complete Collection (HMV Exclusive) – 22 January 2018

Australia Region 4

- Series One and Two – 17 November 2005 (Re-released 1 February 2012)
- Series Three and Four – 3 October 2007 (Re-released 1 February 2012)
- Series Five – 3 November 2011
