= Gilly Coman =

British actress (1955–2010)

- Born: Gillian Helen Coman; 13 September 1955; Liverpool, England
- Died: 13 July 2010 (aged 54); Wirral, England
- Occupation: Actress
- Years active: 1978–2000
- Spouse: Phil Cutts (m. 1976)
- Children: 4

Gilly Coman (13 September 1955 – 13 July 2010) was an English actress, who played Aveline in the first four series of Carla Lane's sitcom Bread.

== Life and career ==
Coman appeared in Scully, Coronation Street, Brookside, A Touch of Frost, Springhill, Emmerdale Farm, the BBC sitcom Open All Hours and Inspector Morse in which she played Holly Trevors in the episode "The Day of the Devil." She also appeared in Boys From the Blackstuff as a DHSS employee in the Job Centre frequented by the main characters

Coman also played Marigold Lockton in The Man Who Made Husbands Jealous (1997), the TV adaptation of the Jilly Cooper novel.

Gilly Coman died of a suspected heart attack on 13 July 2010, at the age of 54. She had a heart condition and died just two weeks before she was scheduled for a pacemaker operation.
