= Robin Nash =

British television producer and executive (1927–2011)

Robert Henry Douglas Drane (10 March 1927 – 18 June 2011), known professionally as Robin Nash, was a British television producer and executive, known as producer of Top of the Pops from 1973 to 1980. At the BBC, he became Head of Variety and later Head of Television Comedy.

== Background and early career ==
Nash was born in Norwich and grew up in Cromer on the north Norfolk coast, where he was educated at Paston School. His initial theatrical training was as a young member of Miss Alexander's dance group at the Lecture Hall in the town. Often the only boy in the group, he was therefore sure of a place in their productions at the local venues. A fellow dancer was his sister Anne (Lewin), a ballerina and West End dancer who would later become a Wing Commander in the Royal Air Force. As a teenager during the Second World War he entertained allied troops and met David Croft who later co-wrote Dad's Army for the BBC.

Following a series of acting and other theatrical jobs in London's West End, Nash joined the BBC as a studio manager in 1955. In 1961 he directed location filming for Ted Willis's thriller Flowers of Evil and, in 1962–3, worked on two of Willis's other creations, the long-running police drama Dixon of Dock Green and the comedy-drama series Taxi! starring Sid James.

Succeeding situation comedies included Marriage Lines (as producer from 1965), which, since 1961, had brought Richard Briers and Prunella Scales to a wide audience, and the Comedy Playhouse pilot (1967) for a series of The Old Campaigner with Terry-Thomas, Jonathan Cecil and Elaine Taylor among others. Nash also worked during this period with Alan Melville on Before the Fringe (re-enacting sketches from past theatrical revues, 1967), Beryl Reid (Beryl Reid Says Good Evening, 1968) and Dora Bryan (According to Dora, 1968).

== 1970s and 1980s ==
From 1973 to July 1980 Nash was producer (later executive producer) of Top of the Pops, a British weekly chart-based popular music show. Nash started as co-producer with Stanley Dorfman. During this period TOTP regularly attracted audiences of 15 million. Nash briefly returned to the executive producer role in January 1981, whilst current executive producer Michael Hurll was on holiday leave.

Concurrently, Nash produced for children's television The Basil Brush Show (featuring Derek Fowlds and a garrulous puppet fox, 1972–75) and the variety show Crackerjack (1975–77), and worked with Bruce Forsyth and then Larry Grayson on The Generation Game (from 1976). In 1978 he became Head of Variety at the BBC.

In the 1980s Nash produced such comedy shows as Terry and June (with Terry Scott and June Whitfield, 1985), No Place Like Home (with William Gaunt, 1983–1987), and Carla Lane's I Woke Up One Morning (1985–86) and Bread (1986–1991). He was appointed Head of Television Comedy in 1989, moving three years later into work for production companies, including Alomo's sitcom Goodnight Sweetheart for the BBC (1993–99) and Harry Hill's series for Channel 4 (1998–2000).

== Demeanour and approach ==
With his background in the BBC's "old school", Nash was a dapper and quite flamboyant figure, recognisable by his jaunty bow-ties and moustache. Tony Blackburn, a TOTP presenter in the 1970s, recalled that he "seemed perfectly in tune with the [1970s] era, forever camping it up with his booming, over-the-top voice." A fellow BBC executive, Will Wyatt, described him as "a big, warm, cuddly bear of a man with an easy charm at work and a huge collection of Clarice Cliff pottery at home".

Nash regretted that the use of recording and editing techniques detracted from the sense of "performance" that could be achieved from live television, and once said that he would "love Top of the Pops to be live" (rather as its forerunner, and then competitor, Ready Steady Go!, had been).

In his later years, Nash occasionally contributed to documentaries about the history of television. He died during a season of repeats on BBC Four of editions of Top of the Pops that he had produced in 1976, and the day after the funeral of Flick Colby, who had choreographed dance sequences for the show during Nash's years as a producer.
