= Jonathon Morris =

British actor (born 1960)

- Born: John Charles Morris; 20 July 1960 (age 66); Urmston, Lancashire, England.
- Occupation: Actor
- Years active: 1979–2012
- Television: The Professionals (1980); The Squad (1980); Jackanory Playhouse (1981); That Beryl Marston...! (1981); Beau Geste (1982); The Consultant (1983); Doctor Who (1983); The Prisoner of Zenda (1984); Bread (1986–1991)

John Charles Morris (born 20 July 1960) is a British former actor.

== Career ==
Jonathon Morris' first professional theatre appearance was playing the title role in Old King Cole, written by Ken Campbell, alongside Sir Daniel Day-Lewis at the Old Vic Theatre, Bristol in 1979. His first major drama miniseries was Beau Geste in 1982. His first major comedy series was in 1981 with That Beryl Marston…! His first narration appearance came with Jackanory in 1984 and his first major movie Torn Allegiance in 1984.

His first major musical appearance was in 1986 at The London Palladium in La Cage Aux Folles. He made his first major Variety appearance in the 1989 Children's Royal Variety Performance and he appeared as 'The Director' in the 1991 Children's Royal Variety Performance. Morris found recognition in the UK with the BBC comedy series Bread and as the presenter of the CBBC children's television show, The Movie Game. He was introduced to a worldwide audience with the Hollywood movie-musical, The Fantasticks released in 2000.

== Theatre ==
After making his professional theatre debut at the Old Vic Theatre, Bristol in 1979 with Daniel Day-Lewis, Morris appeared as a guest/servant in the 1981 Chichester Festival Theatre production of The Cherry Orchard directed by Patrick Garland and starring Joss Ackland and Claire Bloom.

He then played Charles Parker in Feasting with Panthers, (The Trials of Oscar Wilde) with Tom Baker in the role of Oscar Wilde. In the same season, he made his directorial debut with Final Furlong as part of the Chichester Festival Tent season.

In 1982, he performed with the Oxford Playhouse Company in the British Premiere of Rain from Heaven by S.H. Berhman, directed by Nicolas Kent and starring Sheila Gish. He returned to the Chichester Festival Theatre in 1983 where he played Orlando in As You Like It, with Patricia Hodge OBE, as Rosalind and directed by Patrick Garland. In the same season, Morris and Patricia Hodge also appeared together in Stag, by Edna O’Brien, as part of the Chichester Festival Tent season.

In 1983, he played Eugene Marchbanks in George Bernard Shaw's Candida at The Yvonne Arnaud Theatre, Guildford. Petula Clark was in the title role of Candida and the production was directed by Val May. In 1984 he played Heathcliff in Wuthering Heights, alongside Charlotte Attenborough as Catherine Earnshaw for the Cambridge Theatre Company. In the same season, he played alongside Douglas Hodge in The Beaux Stratagem, directed by Nicolas Kent.

In 1986, he made his West End Musical debut at The London Palladium, playing Jean-Michel in the Tony Award-winning musical La Cage Aux Folles, written by Jerry Herman and directed by Arthur Laurents. The production starred Denis Quilley and Tony Award winner George Hearn. In 1987 he appeared for The Bristol Old Vic at The Royalty Theatre, London in the role of Tony Orford in Noel Coward's Semi-Monde, in an all-star cast including Dame Judi Dench, Sir Kenneth Branagh, and Evelyn Laye CBE.

In 1988, he played Joe Orton in an extensive national tour of Diary of a Somebody, a dramatized adaptation of the diaries of Joe Orton, adapted by John Lahr.

In 1989, he appeared with Evelyn Laye once again at the Barbican Hall, The Barbican Centre in a Gala performance of A Talent to Amuse. (The music of Noel Coward)

In the same year, he appeared at The Edinburgh International Festival, playing Sir Edward Mortimer in a production of Mary Stuart, written by Friedrich von Schiller, directed by Frank Dunlop, and starring Elizabeth Bennet and Hannah Gordon. In the same year, he joined Hannah Gordon once again, in an all-star cast, including Dame Judi Dench and Donald Sinden CBE in a gala performance of Star Quality by Noel Coward at The Richmond Theatre, London in the presence of Princess Alexandra.

== Theatre 1990 until 2003 ==
In 1991, he joined Joanna Riding in the West-End musical Me and My Girl at the Adelphi Theatre, London, taking over the lead role of Bill Snibson from Brian Conley. In 1992 he returned for his third season at The Chichester Festival Theatre to play Tony Lumpkin in a production of She Stoops to Conquer, directed by Peter Wood, featuring Iain Glen and Tom Hollander. In the same season, Hollander joined Morris and Doon Mackichan in a production at The Minerva Theatre of Gillian Plowman's play, Me and My Friend, directed by Ian Rickson.

In 1993, he played Henry the 5th at the Royal Albert Hall in the St. Georges Day Festival, featuring Marti Webb. Also In 1993 he revived his 1983 role of Marchbanks in Candida, by George Bernard Shaw, on a major national tour.

In 1993, he finished the Richmond Theatre pantomime season with Kate O’Mara and Bernard Cribbins. In 1994 Morris took on the role of Frank-n-Furter in The Rocky Horror Show, written by Richard O’Brien, on a national tour to celebrate its 21st anniversary. The show then transferred to London's West End at The Duke of York's Theatre.

In 1995, he played Arthur Kipps in the BBC radio production of the musical Half a Sixpence, featuring Lesley Phillips and the BBC Concert Orchestra. He played El Gallo in the musical The Fantasticks at the Kings Head Theatre In 1996, directed by Dan Crawford.

In 1996, he appeared in Spread a Little Happiness at the Adelphi Theatre, London to celebrate the music and life of Vivian Ellis, the cast included Susannah York and Sir John Mills. He played Judas Iscariot in Barabbas at The Chelsea Centre, Kings Road in 1988. In 2008 Morris appeared in I'd Like to Teach the World to Sing, at Her Majesty's Theatre, London, directed by Dame Gillian Lynne, cast included Jeremy Irons, Elaine Paige, and Andrew Lloyd Webber.

== Television and film ==
An early screen role was in The Agatha Christie Hour (1982) as Alan Carslake. In the 1984 classic drama, Morris played John Geste, alongside Benedict Taylor and Anthony Calf, in the BBC TV miniseries Beau Geste. In 1983 he appeared as Jake Kennedy in the miniseries The Consultant with Hywel Bennet, directed by Cyril Coke. in 1984 he played Rupert of Hentzau in the BBC mini-series The Prisoner of Zenda, directed by Douglas Camfield. In 1985 he played Pete in Graham Reid's Northern Ireland drama, Ties of Blood. He also appeared in the Professionals and Doctor Who. In comedy, he appeared as Phil in the series That Beryl Marston…! alongside Julia Mackenzie, Gareth Hunt, and Millicent Martin. Morris played the character of Adrian in the hugely successful Carla Lane BBC comedy series Bread appearing in all seven series. The ratings for the series peaked at 21 million viewers. He is also known for Hells Bells alongside Derek Nimmo and Sir Robert Stephens. He appeared in Carlton's revival of the Comedy Playhouse series, playing David in Wild Oats. He played Simon in the TV movie Summer of Love alongside Jenny Agutter.

Morris presented the CBBC game show The Movie Game from 1991 to 1993. He presented the BBC's Jackanory in 1984. He would go on to record numerous credits, most notably with the production of Saddlebottom by Dick King-Smith and Curious Creatures, with Dame Penelope Wilton. In 1988 he presented ‘Trailblazers’, (In Search of the Komodo Dragon) a documentary for The Discovery Channel, filmed in Indonesia.

He made his debut in movies in 1981 playing Damien in Screamtime, produced by Manson International. (USA) He played Lieutenant Harry Wyckham in Torn Allegiance, produced by SABC and released in 1984. He further played Ash in Vampire Journals (1997) and later appeared in Subspecies 4: Bloodstorm. (1998).

Morris starred in the MGM/ United Artists screen adaptation of the Broadway musical The Fantasticks, released in 2000. The movie was directed by Michael Ritchie and featured Joel Grey, alongside Joey McIntyre as Matt and Jean Louisa Kelly as Luisa, Morris played role of El Gallo.

== Variety ==
He made his debut on the Children's Royal Variety Performance in 1989, attended by Princess Margaret, Guests included Kylie Minogue. His second appearance on the Children's Royal Variety Performance was in 1990, star guests included Sir Cliff Richard.

In 1991, he appeared as 'The Director' of The Children's Royal Variety Performance in the presence of Princess Margaret, the show was introduced by Jeremy Irons and the cast included Susan Hampshire.

In 1986, he appeared at the London Palladium in a gala performance of the musical La Cage Aux Folles attended by Princess Anne. As a member of the cast of the BBC series Bread, he appeared before the Queen Mother at the London Palladium in the 1988 Royal Variety Performance. He joined the cast of La Cage Aux Folles for the Olivier Awards in 1987.

In 1990, he appeared before the Queen Mother in A Royal Birthday Gala, celebrating the Queen Mother's ninetieth birthday, the guests included Dame Vera Lynn, Placido Domingo, and Sir John Gielgud.

== Credits ==
=== Theatre ===
Year(s)	Title	Role	Venue	Notes
1979–1980	Old King Cole	Old King Cole	Bristol Old Vic – Theatre Royal.	
1981	The Cherry Orchard	Guests & Servants	Chichester Festival Theatre	
1981	Feasting with Panthers	Charles Parker	Chichester Festival Theatre	As Johnathon Morris
1982	Rain from Heaven	Clendon Wyatt	Oxford Playhouse	As Johnathon Morris
1983	As You Like It	Orlando de Boys	Chichester Festival Theatre	
1983	Stag	Jo	Chichester Festival Theatre	
1983	Final Furlong	Director	Chichester Festival Theatre	Director of production
1983	Candida	Eugene Marchbanks	Yvonne Arnaud Theatre, Guildford	
1984	The Beaux Stratagem	Sir Charles Freeman	Cambridge Theatre Company, UK Tour	
1984	Wuthering Heights	Heathcliff	Harlow Playhouse	
1986–1987	La Cage aux Folles	Jean-Michel	London Palladium	
1987	Mary Stuart	Mortimer	Assembly Hall Edinburgh	
1987–1988	Semi-Monde	Performer	Royalty Theatre, Kingsway, London	
1988	Diary of a Somebody	Joe Orton	Key Theatre, Peterborough	
1988	Jack and the Beanstalk	Jack	Assembly Hall Theatre, Tunbridge Wells	
1988	Barabbas	Judas Iscariot	The Chelsea Centre Theatre, World's End Place, King's Road, London	
1989	A Talent to Amuse	Unknown	Barbican Hall, Barbican Centre, London	
1989	Dick Whittington	Dick Whittington	Orchard Theatre, Dartford	
1989	Star Quality	Tony Orford	Richmond Theatre	
1990	Cinderella	Buttons	Cardiff New Theatre	
1991	Me and My Girl	Bill Snibson	Adelphi Theatre, London	
1991	Cinderella	Buttons	Grand Theatre, Leeds	
1991	Dick Whittington	Dick Whittington	Yvonne Arnaud Theatre Guildford	
1992	Me and My Friend	Bunny	Minerva Theatre, Chichester Festival Theatre	
1992	Cinderella	Buttons	Wycombe Swan	
1992	She Stoops to Conquer	Tony Lumpkin	Chichester Festival Theatre	
1992–1993	Candida	Eugene Marchbanks	Yvonne Arnaud Theatre, Guildford	National Tour
1993	St. George's Day Festival	King Henry V	Royal Albert Hall, London	
1993	Dick Whittington	Dick Whittington	Richmond Theatre, London	
1994–1995	The Rocky Horror Show	Dr Frank-n-Furter	National Tour	
1995	Jack and the Beanstalk	Jack	Hull New Theatre	
1996	Robin Hood and the Babes in the Wood	Simple Simon	Grand Opera House, York	
1996	Spread a Little Happiness	Ensemble	Adelphi Theatre, London.	
1996	The Fantasticks	El Gallo	King's Head Theatre, London.	
1998	Cinderella	Buttons	Swansea Grand Theatre	
1999	Aladdin	Aladdin	Cliffs Pavilion, Southend-on-Sea	
1999	Cinderella	Buttons	Connaught Theatre, Worthing	
1999	No Sex Please, We're British	Brian Runnicles	Swansea Grand Theatre	National Tour
2000	Robin Hood and the Babes in the Wood	Sheriff of Nottingham	Blackpool Grand Theatre	
2001	Anything Goes	Billy Crocker	UK Tour	
2001	Cinderella	Buttons	Floral Pavilion Theatre, New Brighton	
2002	Dick Whittington	Dick Whittington	Doncaster Civic Theatre	
2003	Jack and the Beanstalk	Jack	Floral Pavilion Theatre, New Brighton	
2003	Trap for a Lonely Man	Daniel Corban	Theatre Royal, Windsor	
2008	I'd Like To Teach The World to Sing	Performer / Self	Her Majesty's Theatre	
2012	Sleeping Beauty	Puddles	Echo Arena, Liverpool	

=== Film ===
Year	Film	Role	Director	Notes
1983	Screamtime	Damien	Michael Armstrong; Stanley A. Long	credited as Johnathan Morris
1984	Torn Allegiance	Lt. Harry Wyckham	Alan Nathanson	
1995	The Fantasticks	El Gallo	Michael Ritchie	
1997	Vampire Journals	Ash	Ted Nicolaou	
1998	Subspecies 4 Bloodstorm	Ash	Ted Nicolaou	

=== Television ===
Year	Title	Role	Notes
1980	The Professionals	Jaime Cabreros	4.08 "Blood Sports"
1980	The Squad	Steve Parks	1.12 "Accident"
1981	Jackanory Playhouse	Oliver	9.06 "The Toy Princess"
1981	That Beryl Marston...!	Phil	6 episodes
1982	The Agatha Christie Hour	Alan Carslake	1.02 "In a Glass Darkly"
1982	Beau Geste	John Geste	7 episodes
1983	Doctor Who	Chela	20.02 "Snakedance"
1983	The Consultant	Jake Kennedy	Television miniseries
1984	The Prisoner of Zenda	Rupert of Hentzau	Television miniseries
1984–1992	Jackanory	Storyteller	20 episodes
1985	Ties of Blood	Pete	Television miniseries (credited as Jonathan Morris)
1986	The Practice	Mick Forrester	Television miniseries
1986	Hell's Bells	Phil	1.03 "Back Page Story"
1986–1991	Bread	Adrian Boswell	74 episodes
1989	Eggs 'n' Baker	Self - Guest	Television Series - S2.E9
1989	The Noel Edmonds Saturday Roadshow	Self	S2.E8
1989–1991	Going Live!	Self	3 episodes
1990	The Paul Daniels Magic Show	Self	Television Series - S11.E3
1991–1993	The Movie Game	Host	40 episodes
1992	Cluedo	Self - Studio Guest	Television Series - S3.E4 - Murder in Merrie England
1993	Comedy Playhouse	David Jackson	1.02 "Wild Oats"
1994	Noel's House Party	Self	S3.E10
1997	Summer of Love	Simon	Television film
1998	Adam's Family Tree	Whip	Television Series - "Singing with the Reins"
