= The Movie Game (British TV series) =

British children's game show

- Genre: Game show
- Presented by: Phillip Schofield (1988–90); Jonathon Morris (1991–93); John Barrowman (1994–95)
- Country of origin: United Kingdom
- Original language: English
- No. of series: 8
- No. of episodes: 95 (inc. 3 specials)

Production
- Running time: 25 minutes

Original release
- Network: BBC1
- Release: 8 June 1988 – 25 December 1995

The Movie Game is a game show that ran from 8 June 1988 to 25 December 1995 on BBC1. The format is three teams of two players answering questions about films, the team with the fewest points at the end of the first round are eliminated. The other two teams moved on to a board game-style end game. The winning team could, depending on the points they earned, move on to the series final and the winner of that would win a film related prize such as meeting Steven Spielberg. Most show's from the last 2 series featured a celebrity guest.

== Format ==
The show starts with three teams of two players in the colours Red, Green and Yellow. They first answer questions about film in a quick-fire round. They are then shown a clip from a film and are asked observation questions about the clip. Another quick-fire round followed this. At the end of each of these rounds each team was shown one of three pictures which, combined, depicted a film, the team had to guess what film this was and were allowed to guess once the first two pictures had been revealed receiving bonus points if they guessed correctly with two pictures. Throughout the show the teams would be given a genre of film, a famous star, a prop and a sound effect. They would then be asked to write a short script and plot for a film which they would act out with relevant prop and sound effect. This would be marked out of ten by the audience.

The top two teams would move onto the end game. Originally it was a set of stairs in the style of a roll of film, this quickly changed to an ordinary board. The teams would move round the board answering questions. They could decide if they wanted to go 2, 3 or 4 spaces however they could only choose 4 spaces once as it was a special called Fast Forward.

The board had three special squares marked out with a door. When a team landed on one of these they would be transported to a mini game by the special effects. Only the first pair to make it to the special spaces would play the mini game. If the game involved costumes the team would wear them around the rest of the board. The mini games always involved the celebrity guest. These were either action-based or required basic practical skill or knowledge related to the history of movie making. The theme was often based on the occupation of the celebrity guest. They were marked out of ten for and the mark was added to their score.

The team that made it to the last space first won the game regardless of the points. Both finalist teams won a selection to prizes with the winning team winning the best prizes. The top 8 winners with the best scores during the series would compete in the final.

The series final had the same format but with 8 teams in the first round in the additions colours Orange, White, Puce, Tartan and Marzipan.

== Transmissions ==
=== Series ===
Series	Start date	End date	Episodes
1	8 June 1988	20 July 1988	7
2	17 May 1989	19 July 1989	10
3	4 April 1990	27 June 1990	13
4	3 April 1991	26 June 1991	13
5	8 April 1992	1 July 1992	13
6	7 April 1993	30 June 1993	13
7	8 April 1994	1 July 1994	13
8	3 April 1995	17 July 1995	13

=== Specials ===
Date	Entitle
29 December 1993	Christmas Special
28 December 1994	Christmas Special
25 December 1995	Christmas Special
