= National Operatic and Dramatic Association =

- National Operatic and Dramatic Association
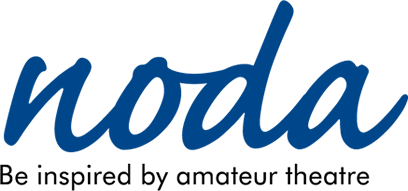
- Founded: 1899
- Headquarters: Woodston, Peterborough
- Location: United Kingdom
- Key people: Dale Freeman, COO; Patron - The Lord Lloyd-Webber, Connie Fisher
- Affiliations: Central Council for Amateur Theatre, Voluntary Arts Network
- Website: www.noda.org.uk/

NODA has a membership of over 2,500 amateur theatre groups and 1000 individual enthusiasts throughout the UK, staging musicals, operas, plays, concerts and pantomimes in a wide variety of performing venues, ranging from the country's leading professional theatres to tiny village halls.

== History ==
It was founded in 1899.

== Structure ==
NODA is divided into 11 regions, each headed by a regional councillor who sits on the national council (the ruling body of the association), supported by a network of regional representatives. These 190 volunteers are the vital link to the grass roots of the association, the amateur theatre groups themselves. NODA is administered from its headquarters in Peterborough. In 2017 NODA became a Charitable Incorporated Organisation.

== Operation ==
There is a range of ages involved in amateur theatre nationwide, from a number of youth groups to adult companies which meet the needs of all levels of performers, whether dramatic or musical, and enthusiasts involved backstage, front of house or in administration. Each production created is a community event.

NODA aims:

- To give a shared voice to the amateur theatre sector
- To help amateur societies and individuals achieve the highest standards of best practice and performance
- To provide leadership and advice to enable amateur theatre to tackle the challenges and opportunities of the 21st century

Benefits of membership include access to NODA's advice service at national and regional level, representation to government, funding agencies, rightsholders and the media, and access to conferences, workshops and seminars to help share information on best practice. NODA also holds an annual residential theatre Summer School (with bursaries available) offering training from professional tutors in drama performance, music directing, musical theatre, stage management and other courses for performers, theatre directors and technicians. Both national and regional news about NODA and its member societies is published in its in-house magazine, NODA Today. NODA also holds annual national and regional Programme and Poster competitions, to encourage the highest standards in design.

NODA's trading arm, NODA Limited, acts as a mechanism for raising additional funds for the association. Its publishing department, NODA Pantomimes, offers more than 100 scripts by such popular authors as Leonard Caddy, Peter Denyer, Stephen Duckham, Ron Hall, Peter Long and Keith Rawnsley, Robert Marlowe, Geoffrey Rundle and Keith Marsden, John Morley and David Swan, and other publications including The Slipper and the Rose, a musical based on the film of the same name, and practical guides for performers and directors. It also offers Long Service Awards, and discounts on playscripts, libretti and scores and theatre books from the catalogue of A & C Black. NODA members can purchase theatrical make-up from Charles Fox at a special discounted price.

NODA Insurance, arranged through Lloyd & Whyte offers a comprehensive insurance package for amateur theatre groups.
