= Under Two Flags =

Under Two Flags may refer to:

- Under Two Flags (novel), a novel by British writer Ouida, and its adaptations:
  - Under Two Flags (play), a 1901 play by Paul M. Potter
  - Under Two Flags (1912 George Nichols film), a short directed by George Nichols
  - Under Two Flags (1912 Lucius Henderson film), a short directed by Lucius J. Henderson
  - Under Two Flags (1915 film), a short starring Helen Bray
  - Under Two Flags (1916 film), starring Theda Bara
  - Under Two Flags (1922 film), directed by Tod Browning
  - Under Two Flags (1936 film), featuring Ronald Colman, Claudette Colbert, Victor McLaglen and Rosalind Russell
