= Afternoon (disambiguation) =

Afternoon is the time between noon and sunset or evening.

Afternoon may also refer to:

- Afternoon (play), an 1883 play by Ouida
- Afternoon (EP), a 2009 EP by Mae
- Afternoon, a story, a hypertext novel by Michael Joyce
- The Afternoon Despatch & Courier, a newspaper published in Mumbai, India
- Monthly Afternoon, a Japanese manga magazine published by Kodansha
- Afternoon, a 1965 film directed by Andy Warhol
- Afternoon, a 2015 film directed by Tsai Ming-liang

== See also ==
- Afternoons (band)
