= Paul Potter =

Paul Potter may refer to:

- Paulus Potter (1625–1654, Dutch painter
- Paul M. Potter (1853–1921), American playwright and journalist
