= The City Directory =

Musical comedy play

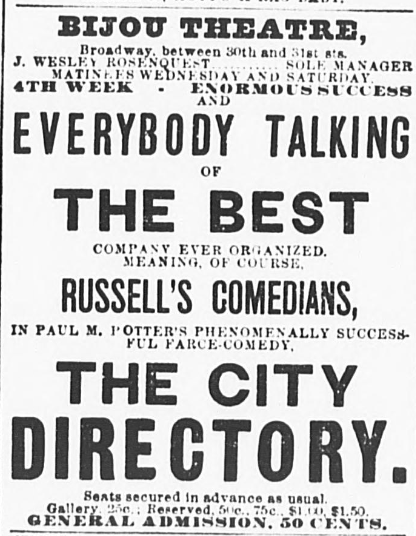
- Ad for play in New York Sun, March 1890
- Original language: English
- Written by: Paul M. Potter

Premiere
- Date: Chicago Opera House (May 1889)

The City Directory is an 1889 American musical comedy play with a book by Paul M. Potter and music by W.S. Mullaly.

Potter's first play, it opened at the Chicago Opera House in May 1889, and featured "Russell's Comedians." After a successful run in Chicago, it ran for 152 performance at the Bijou in Manhattan from February to June 1890, making it one of the biggest hits of the 1889-90 season in New York.

According to a biography of theatrical producer Charles Frohman, when Frohman put Bronson Howard's Shenandoah on the road, the Chicago Tribunes critic disliked the play, which was a disappointment. Potter, who was a friend of Howard, was then able to get a positive Sunday spread in the Tribune about the play, and Potter and Frohman thus became acquainted. Then, when the City Directory opened, it was feared that despite Potter's friendly relations with Chicago critics, the piece would be condemned. Instead, a few minutes into the opening performance, uproarious laughter came from box where Frohman and Howard were watching—to help out their friend Potter. Thus, the biography suggests, the critics "were so impressed that they praised the farce and started The City Directory on a career of remarkable success."

The New York Sun called the show an "outgrowth of the public demand for that type of funny writing that which is harmless and valueless at the same time, with more song than satire, and with the punctuations of specialities of the vaudeville order."

== Plot ==
A modern description of the New York production describes the plot as focusing on the confusion caused when Chicago detective John Smith (played by Charles Reed) travels to New York to arrest a crook, also named John Smith. A bunch of other "John Smiths" get into the act as they travel around Manhattan.

Not atypical of farces of the period, the content of the show and musical numbers were subject to updating over time. On its 100th performance in New York, the show was advertised as being "rejuvenated" with new parts and music.

== Broadway cast ==
The Broadway cast for the February 10, 1890 New York premiere included:

- Charles Reed
- John W. Jennings
- Alf Hampton
- Ignacio Martinelli
- William Collier
- William F. Mack
- Joseph Jackson
- Josie Sadler
- Helen Reimer
- Marguerite Fish
- Maud Wilson
- Sadie Kirby
- Ollie Archmere
- Amelia Glover
- Julia Glover
