= Under Two Flags (play) =

1901 play by Paul M. Potter

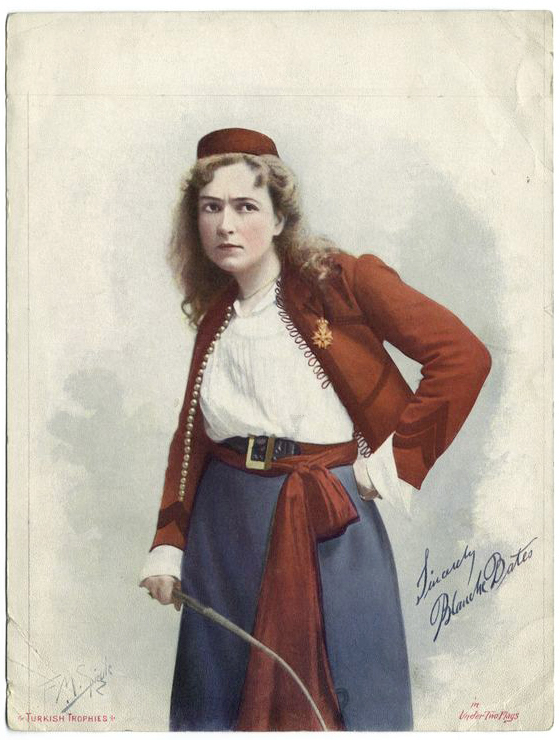
Blanche Bates as Cigarette in the Broadway production of Under Two Flags (1901)

Under Two Flags is a play in five acts by Paul M. Potter. It is based on the 1867 English novel of the same name by Ouida. It premiered at Broadway's Garden Theatre on February 5, 1901. It closed in June 1901 after 135 performances. The original production was produced by Charles Frohman and David Belasco. Belasco also directed the play which starred Campbell Gollan as the Marquis of Chateauroy, Francis Carlyle as Bertie Cecil, and Blanche Bates as Cigarette.

A. Baldwin Sloane's musical burlesque The King's Carnival, which was mounted at the Olympia Theatre while Under Two Flags was still playing at the Garden Theatre, was a parody of courtly dramas of that period. It spoofed several plays, including Potter's Under Two Flags.

Potter's play was the basis for the 1915 silent film Under Two Flags by director Travers Vale for which Potter was a credited screenwriter.
