= Josie Sadler =

American actress

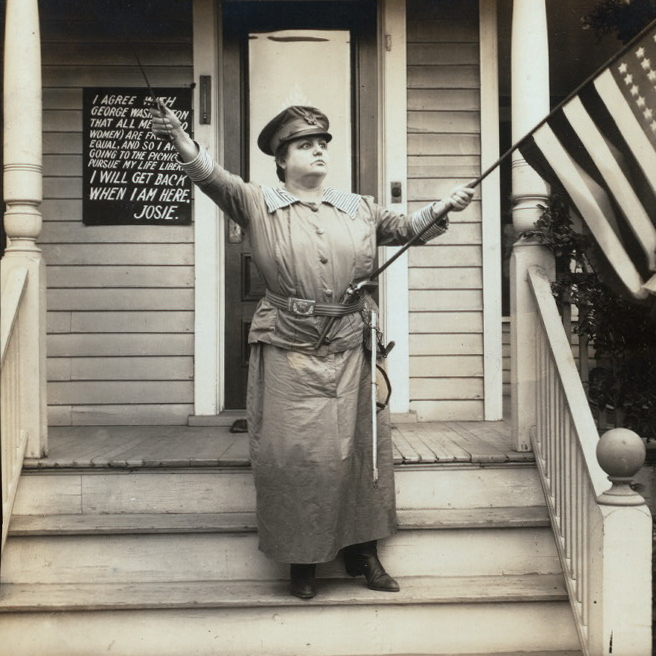
- Josie Sadler in 1914 film "Josie's Declaration of Independence"
- Born: Josephine Rauscher; 1871; New York City
- Died: 1927 (aged 55–56)
- Occupation: comedian
- Years active: 1880–1918

Josie Sadler (1871–1927) was for twenty years a leading American stage comedienne known for her "Dutch" (German) dialect routines and heavy-set appearance. She made several early phonograph recordings for the major companies of the time, and also made several silent films, mostly for Vitagraph. She retired from show business to operate her deceased husband's electrical research business.

== Biography ==
=== Early life and career ===
Josie Sadler was born as Josephine Rauscher in New York City in 1871. Her father was German, and her mother was French. Sadler was discovered at age 9 by Tony Pastor, and after Pastor received parental acquiescence, she appeared in Pastor's production Nursery Rhymes. This engagement lasted for about 4 months. She was educated in the United States, and later in Germany, ending her education at age 15. She then joined the Broadway production of Erminie. Next she worked as a chorus girl in traveling productions of La Marquise and Madelon. Her superior work came to the attention of manager John Russel and she was rewarded with a bit part in Natural Gas. Her next appearance was in the February through June 1890 production of The City Directory at the Bijou Theatre in New York, in the role of an elevator operator named "John Smith". Sadler then appeared in 2 more John Russel productions, Easy Street and Miss McGinty, before engaging with Henry Dixey for revivals of the shows Patience and The Mascot.

=== Featured performer ===
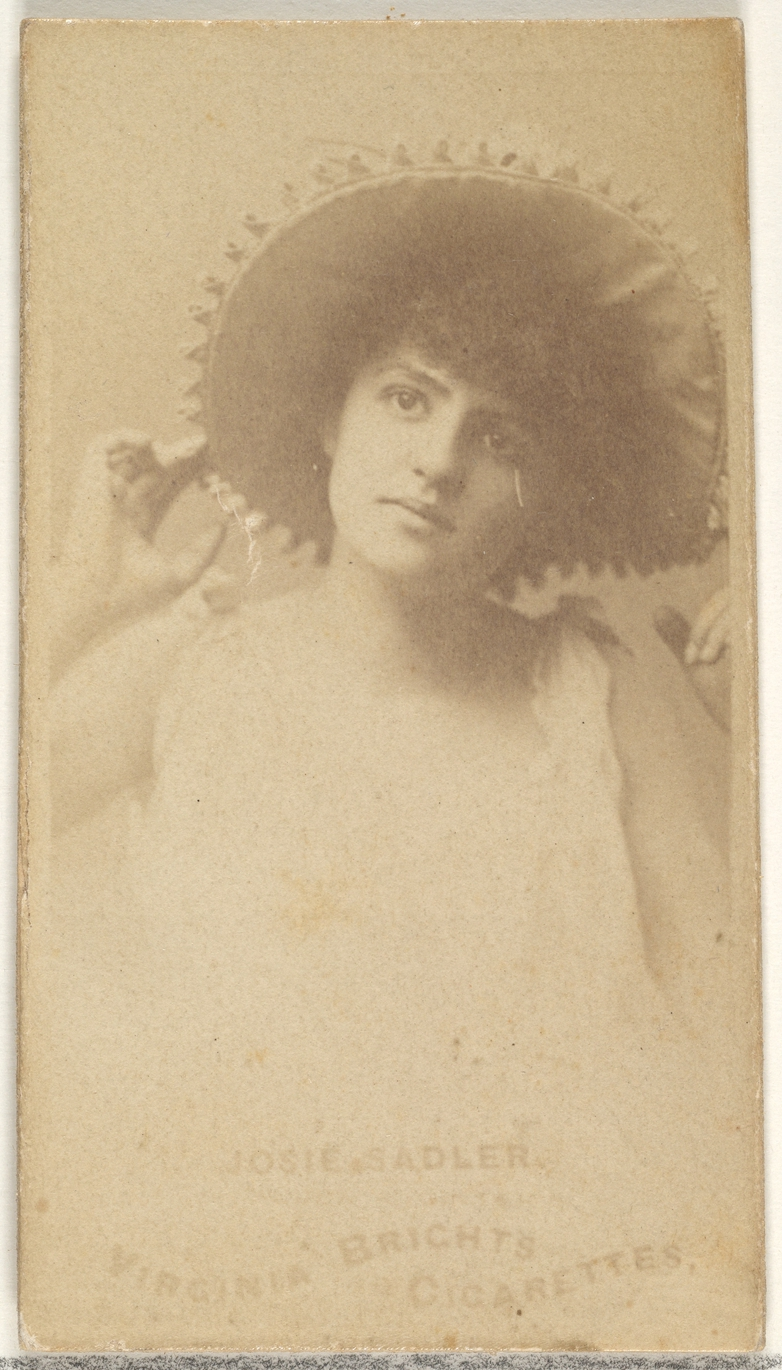
Josie Sadler, ca. 1888, Burdick Collection, Metropolitan Museum of Art

Her German education helped make her one of the prominent "German dialect" comediennes of her day. This combined with her girth made her one of the best known stage comediennes of any type.

In August 1897 she appeared in the William Harris production Good Mr. Best, where she played the role of "Gretchen Slowe", which proved to be one of her favorite characters. Her next role (March 1898) was not "Dutch", but as a cockney named Jemima in Monte Carlo at the Herald Square Theatre.

In February 1899 she was back at the Bijou for Brown's in Town as "Frida Von Hollenbeck", but this production was a failure. She then went to the Webber & Fields' Theater for the part of the sister in Catharine, to great success. Most of the cast, including Sadler, moved on to the production of Hurly Burly. She is credited with originating the "Dutch Girl" role (the "naïve immigrant") on stage, in her performance in the 1899 play Prince Pro Tem. Here she not only starred alongside Fred Lennox in the role of "Wild Rosie of Yucatan," but wrote and performed the hit song of the play, "Oh, If I Could Only get a Decent Sleep." Subsequently, Sadler and Lennox married and Sadler took a bit of time away from performing in order to travel with her new husband while he starred in Princess Bonnie.

September 1899 saw her as "Tryphena Shoolz" in the production A Million Dollars. Following this, she appeared in the Alfred Baldwin Sloane musical Broadway to Tokio (January 1900), where she again sang "Oh, If I Could Only get a Decent Sleep". Next was a role in the play The Supper Club at the New York Roof Garden. She was again at the New York Theater for The Hall of Fame. She starred in The Silver Slipper in 1902. The biggest success of her stage career came in 1903, in the vehicle Peggy from Paris. In this play she performed as Peggy's "Dutch Maid" and had a featured song in which she described her son, a bassoon player. In 1908 she headlined with Charles A. Bigelow in the play A Waltz Dream, where she played the role of "Fifi", a bass drummer. It was this year that her phonograph records began to appear. The same year she appeared as "Miss Tiny Daly" in the play The Mimic World, which ran for 100 performances at the Moorish Casino Theatre and the Grand Opera House. Her next theatrical appointment was in Lew Fields' The Jolly Bachelors, followed by, at the Globe Theatre, The Bachelor Belles, which ran for 32 performances through November and December 1910. She was next alongside Eddie Foy and Lillian Lorraine in Over the River. She appeared in a play entitled Will O' Th' Wisp for the Summer 1911 season at Chicago's Studebaker Theater and was among the featured performers of the 1912 Ziegfeld Follies.

=== Film and later career ===
Sadler joined Vitagraph in March 1913. Her first appearance on film was shown May 1913, in support of Norma Talmadge's Omens and Oracles. In 1914 she made a series of five comedy films for Vitagraph which co-starred Billy Quirk, entitled "Josie Comedies". The films were not very successful, and the "Josie" series did not continue. After two years at Vitagraph, Sadler moved to the World Film Corporation and appeared in the feature film What Happened to Jones? in 1915. She continued to work on the stage, appearing as "Alma" in the 1916 production The Blue Envelope. At this point she went on the vaudeville circuit with her sketch "Moving Pictures" based on her movie-acting experience.

=== Businesswoman and death ===
Sadler retired from show business in 1918 in order to run her husband's (at this point no longer Mr. Lennox, but a Mr. Geddes) electrical research business, subsequent to his death. She was now known as Josephine S. Geddes. Although she was uneducated in business or in electrical science, she did the bookkeeping and ran the daily operations with the assistance of her son, William Geddes. The career transition was reported to be successful, she credited her show-business background with giving her the ability to judge people's characters quickly, and with instilling her with resourcefulness and perseverance. She also gave credit to her husband's business friends and her employees who readily assisted her. Sadler credited herself with using her sense of humor to improve the mood of the workplace. She died in 1927.

== Personal life ==
Sadler's hobbies included cooking, and she was known to try new recipes of her own invention on her fellow actors. She also prized her collection of autographed photos gathered from her fellow actors. She was married at least twice, and had one son, William Geddes, who followed her both on the stage and into the electrical business.

== Filmography ==
Year	Title	Role
1913	"Omens and Oracles"	Madame Miriam
1913	"The Midget's Revenge"	–
1913	"The Forgotten Latchkey"	Bridget, the maid
1913	"The Coming of Gretchen"	–
1913	"The Curse of the Golden Land"	–
1913	"The Feudists"	–
1913	"The Honorable Algernon"	–
1913	"John Tobin's Sweetheart"	–
1913	"A Regiment of Two"	–
1913	"When Glasses Are Not Glasses"	–
1914	"Bunny Backslides"	–
1914	"Diana's Dress Reform"	–
1914	"Dr. Polly"	–
1914	"The Sacrifice of Kathleen"	–
1914	"Wanted, a House"	–
1914	"Setting the Style"	–
1914	"The Arrival of Josie"	Josie
1914	"Romantic Josie"	Josie
1914	"Josie's Declaration of Independence"	Josie
1914	"Josie's Coney Island Nightmare"	Josie
1914	"Josie's Legacy"	Josie
1915	"What Happened to Jones?"	Helma

== Discography ==
Sadler's recordings appeared in the market in 1908. Columbia Records was the first to issue records by her, and four Sadler records were ultimately issued. Jim Walsh considered them to be of inferior quality compared to her other recordings. Victor first announced Sadler recordings for sale March, 1909. Paired with "Tipperary" by Billy Murray on Victor 16783, Sadler's recording of "Hilda Loses her Job", a comedy routine with an uncredited Len Spencer remained in the Victor catalogue until 1923. Her recordings consist of comedic singing, intermittent patter, and monologues. Sadler also made cylinder records for Edison beginning in mid-1909. Her records did not sell very well, Walsh speculates that her routines lacked variety, and that her "Dutch" German dialect, used in most of her recordings but not all, was difficult to decipher. Her biggest stage hit "If I Could Only Get Some Sleep" was recorded for Victor December 31, 1908, but never released.

Year	Title	Label	Catalog no.	Notes
1908	"I'd Like to Make a Smash Mit You"	Columbia	3815	10-inch 78 rpm single-sided
1908	"I'd Like to Make a Smash Mit You"	Columbia	A581	10-inch 78 rpm double-sided
1908	"Come and Hear the Orchestra"	Columbia	3901	10-inch 78 rpm single-sided
1908	"Come and Hear the Orchestra"	Columbia	A582	10-inch 78 rpm double-sided
1908	"A Little German Trouble"	Columbia	A596	10-inch 78 rpm double-sided
1908	"One Good Turn Deserves Another"	Columbia	A604	10-inch 78 rpm double-sided
1908	"What's the Use of Working"	Victor	5669	10-inch 78 rpm single-sided
1909	"He Falls for the Ladies Every Time"	Edison	10179	2-minute wax cylinder
1909	"Come and Hear the Orchestra"	Edison	184	4-minute wax cylinder
1909	"Lena from Germany"	Edison	10198	2-minute wax cylinder
1909	"One Good Turn Deserves Another"	Edison	10229	2-minute wax cylinder
1909	"BL-ND and P-G"	Edison	10267	2-minute wax cylinder
1909	"He Falls for the Ladies Every Time"	Victor	5702	10-inch 78 rpm single-sided
1909	"He Falls for the Ladies Every Time"	Victor	16784	10-inch 78 rpm double-sided
1909	"Come and Hear the Orchestra"	Victor	5719	10-inch 78 rpm single-sided
1909	"One Good Turn Deserves Another"	Victor	5717	10-inch 78 rpm single-sided
1909	"I'd Like to Make a Smash Mit You"	Victor	5762	10-inch 78 rpm single-sided
1909	"Heinie Waltzed Round on His Hickory Limb"	Victor	5729	10-inch 78 rpm single-sided
1909	"Beerland"	Victor	16486	10-inch 78 rpm double-sided
1909	"Hilda Loses Her Job"	Victor	5749	10-inch 78 rpm single-sided
1909	"Hilda Loses Her Job"	Victor	16783	10-inch 78 rpm double-sided
1910	"The German Fifth"	Edison	438	4-minute wax cylinder
1910	"How Can You Love Such a Man"	Edison	10420	2-minute wax cylinder
