= The Forgotten Latchkey =

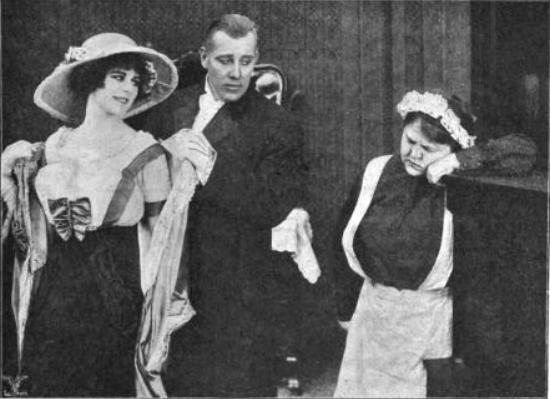
- Anita Stewart, Harry Morey and Josie Sadler in a scene from The Forgotten Latchkey.
- Directed by: Ralph Ince
- Written by: Mrs. Victor Koch
- Starring: Anita Stewart
- Distributed by: Vitagraph
- Release date: June 7, 1913
- Running time: 994 ft
- Country: United States
- Languages: Silent; English intertitles

The Forgotten Latchkey is an American silent comedy film.

== Plot ==
Mr. and Mrs. Burton are staying at the residence of their friends the Moores. The Moores leave to visit Mrs. Moore's mother, and leave a key for the Burtons, who are going out to a dance. Mrs. Burton forgets to take the key with her, and upon their return to the Moore residence, find that they are unable to gain entry, nor are they able to rouse the slumberous maid Bridget. They attempt to enter the house through the cellar, but the door to the kitchen is locked. Further attempts to rouse the maid are futile. They attempt to go to a hotel, but are not admitted. The Burtons end up hiring a taxicab and spending the night in the car, as it is too frigid to walk around outdoors. When the Moore's cook arrives at the house the next morning, she finds the Burtons asleep in the taxi, and believes them to be deceased. Her screams awake the Burtons, and they are finally admitted to the inside of the residence, but not before paying the taxi driver $17.

== Cast ==
- Harry Morey as Mr. Burton
- Anita Stewart as Mrs. Burton
- George Randolph as Mr. Moore
- Edith Storey as Mrs. Moore
- Josie Sadler as Bridget, the Maid
- Florence Ashbrooke as Maggie, the Cook
- James Lackaye as Pat, a Policeman

== Release ==
The Forgotten Latchkey was released in the United States on June 7, 1913, and on September 15, 1913, in England.
