= Under Two Flags (novel) =

Book by Ouida

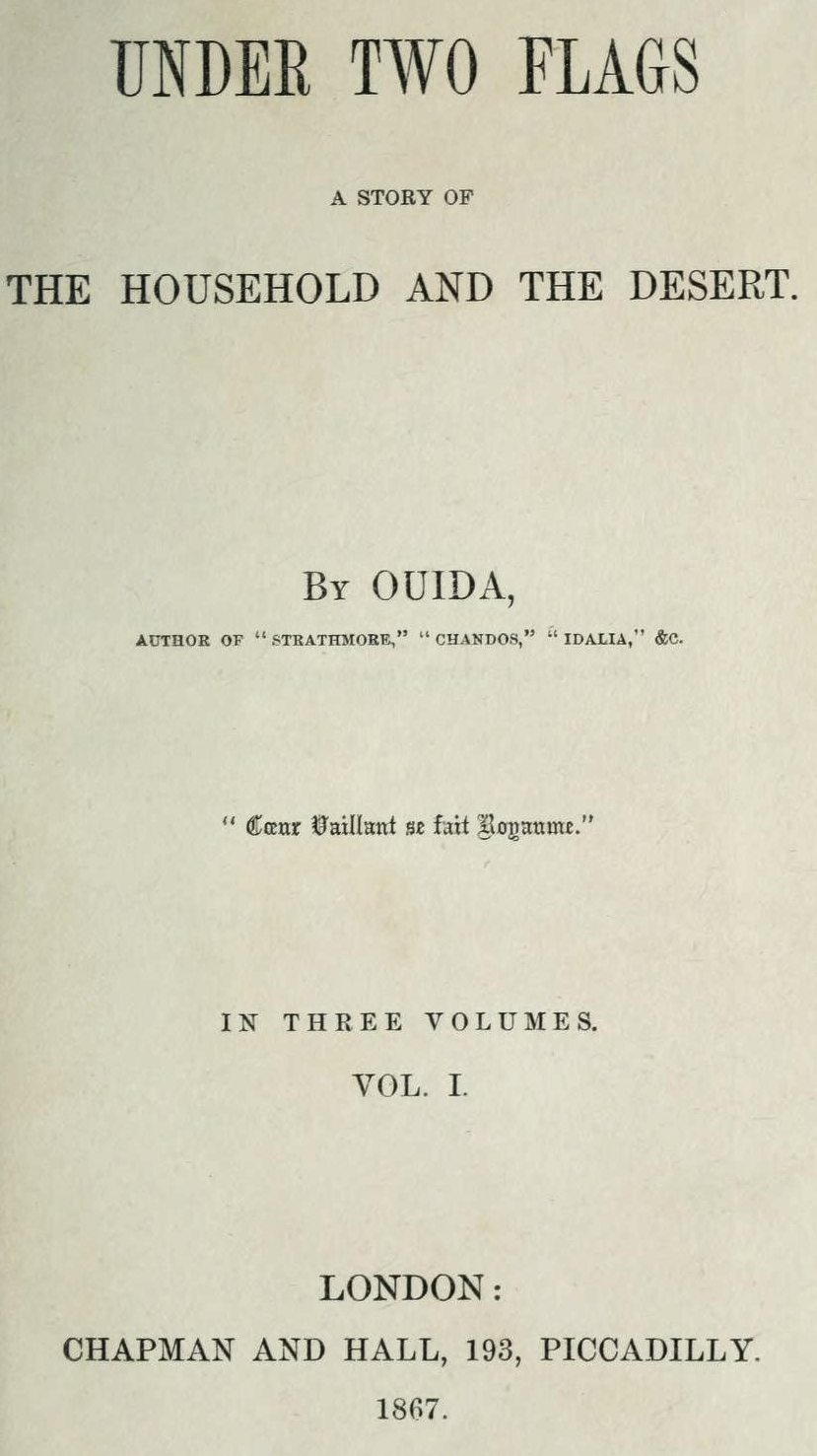
- First edition title page
- Author: Marie Louise de la Ramée
- Language: English
- Genre: Novel
- Publisher: Chapman & Hall
- Publication date: 1867
- Publication place: United Kingdom
- Media type: Print (Hardcover)
- Pages: 321 + 320 + 347

Under Two Flags is an 1867 best-selling novel by Ouida. One of the most famous of her books, it tells the story of an English aristocrat, apparently in disgrace, who disappears and joins a French battalion in Algeria, loosely based on the Foreign Legion. Before being officially published in three volumes by Chapman & Hall in London the book was serialised monthly in the British Army and Navy review from August 1865 until June 1866 when the journal ceased publication.

== Plot ==
The novel is about The Hon. Bertie Cecil (nicknamed Beauty of the Brigades).

In financial distress because of his own profligacy and the loss of an important horse-race on which he has bet extensively, and falsely accused of forgery, but unable to defend himself against the charge without injuring the "honour" of a lady and also exposing his younger brother (the real culprit), Cecil fakes his own death and exiles himself to Algeria where he joins the Chasseurs d'Afrique, a regiment comprising soldiers from various countries, rather like the French Foreign Legion.

After Cecil's great childhood friend and the friend's beautiful sister show up in Africa, and after a series of melodramatic self-sacrifices by Cecil and by the young girl Cigarette, a "child of the Army" who sacrifices her life saving Cecil from a firing squad, the main conflicts are resolved and the surviving characters return to England to fortune, title, and love.

Image of a photograph in the novel 'Under Two Flags'. Photographs from the play and film adaptations were often inserted into copies of the novel such as been done here. (1902)

== Adaptations ==
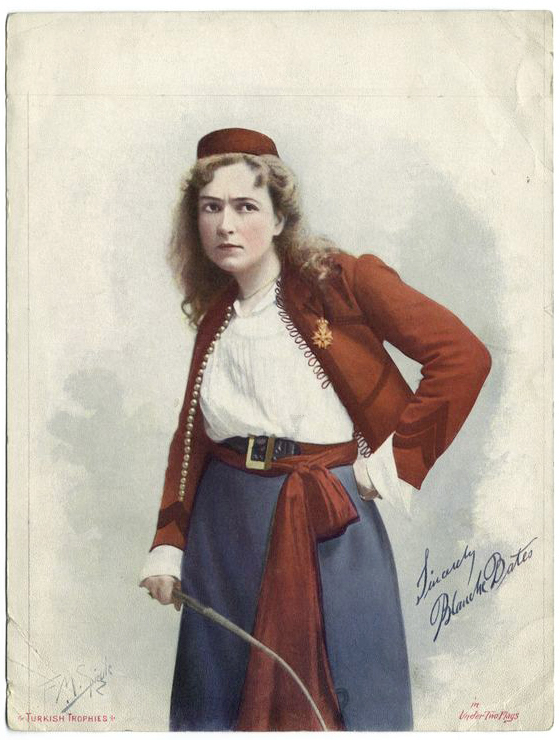
Blanche Bates as Cigarette in David Belasco's Broadway production of Under Two Flags (1901)

The book has also served as a basis for a number of stage and film adaptations.

- Under Two Flags (1893) play by A. Mitchell. In Mitchell's adaptation, Rake has a love interest named Nora McShane.
- Under Two Flags, a 1901 Broadway play by Paul M. Potter that ran for 135 performances at the Garden Theatre, starring Blanche Bates and Maclyn Arbuckle, directed by David Belasco and produced by Charles Frohman.
- Under Two Flags (1912 film; there were two 1912 adaptations, according to IMDb).
- Under Two Flags, a 1915 short film starring Gertrude Astor Written by Potter and adapted from his 1901 play. Directed by Travers Vale.
- Under Two Flags (1916 film), a 1916 film starring Theda Bara
- Under Two Flags (1922 film), a 1922 film directed by Tod Browning starring Priscilla Dean
- Under Two Flags (1936 film), featuring Ronald Colman, Claudette Colbert, Victor McLaglen and Rosalind Russell
- Classics Illustrated's 86th issue is a comic book adaptation of this book, with art by Maurice del Bourgo.
