= Under Two Flags (1916 film) =

1916 film directed by J. Gordon Edwards

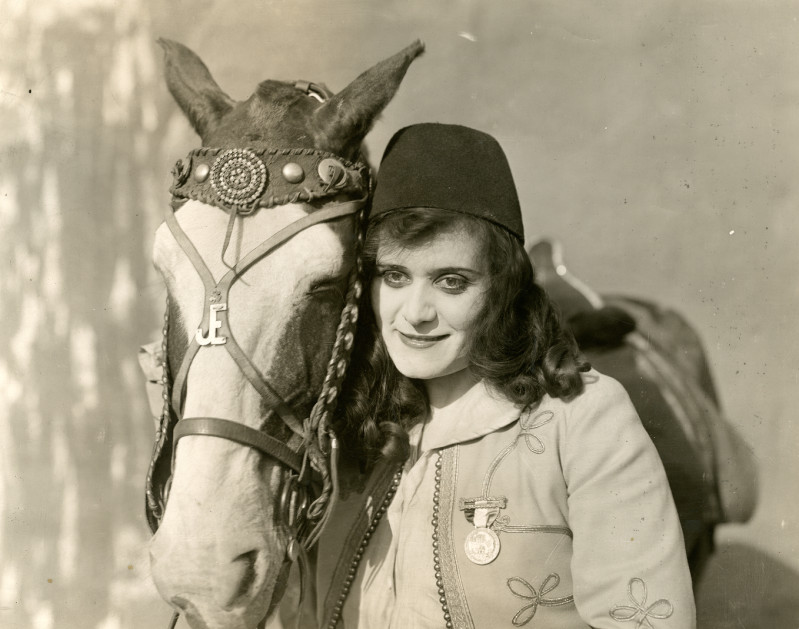
- Still with Theda Bara
- Directed by: J. Gordon Edwards
- Written by: George Edwardes-Hall; Ouida; Arthur Shirley (play)
- Based on: Under Two Flags by Ouida
- Produced by: J. Gordon Edwards
- Starring: Theda Bara; Herbert Heyes
- Cinematography: Phil Rosen
- Distributed by: Fox Film Corporation
- Release date: July 30, 1916
- Running time: 60 minutes
- Country: United States
- Language: Silent (English intertitles)

Under Two Flags is a 1916 American silent drama film directed by J. Gordon Edwards and starring Theda Bara. It was the second adaptation of the best selling 1867 novel Under Two Flags by Ouida and the subsequent stage play version by Arthur Shirley. The film is now considered to be lost.

The film was re-released by Fox Film Corporation in January 1919. The novel/play was adapted to the screen for a third time in 1922 as Under Two Flags by The Universal Film Manufacturing Company and a fourth time in 1936 again as Under Two Flags by 20th Century Fox.

== Plot ==
As described in a film magazine, British nobleman Bertie Cecil (Heyes) takes upon himself the blame for his brother's forgeries and, when supposed dead, enlists in the French Foreign Legion, serving in Algiers. There he wins the friendship of Emir, a native whose wife he had saved from the lust of his commanding officer.

Old friends visit Algiers and recognize Bertie, and urge him to return and claim his own. His refusal leads to a scene where he strikes his commanding officer, and for this he is condemned to death. Cigarette, the "daughter of the regiment," rides to obtain a pardon for Bertie and makes a terrific trip through a sand storm. She arrives too late with the reprieve, but just in time to receive in her own body the bullets intended for Bertie.

== Cast ==
- Theda Bara as Cigarette
- Herbert Heyes as Bertie Cecil
- Stuart Holmes as Chateauroye (Holmes also reprised this role in the 1922 version starring Priscilla Dean)
- Stanhope Wheatcroft as Berkeley Cecil
- Joseph Crehan as Rake
- Charles Craig as Rockingham
- Claire Whitney as Venitia

== See also ==
- List of lost films
- 1937 Fox vault fire
