= Paul M. Potter =

American dramatist

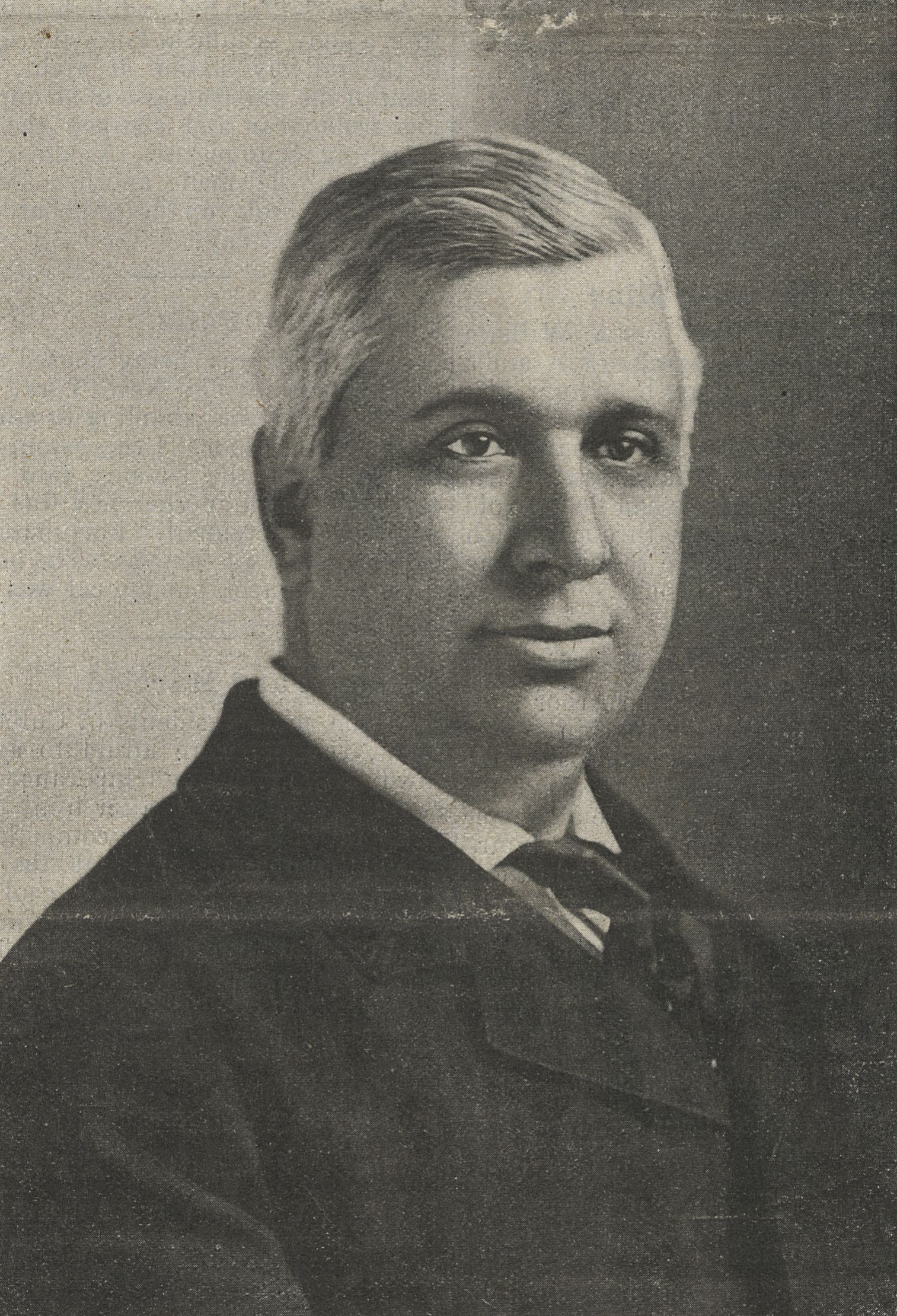
Paul M. Potter

Paul Meredith Potter (June 3, 1853 – March 7, 1921) was an American playwright and journalist, best known for adapting the popular novel Trilby into a stage play.

Potter was born Walter Arthur McLean in Brighton, England in 1853. His father was headmaster of King Edward's School in Bath. He adopted the name Paul Potter after traveling to India upon graduating from school. He became the foreign editor for the New York Herald in 1876, and later their London correspondent. In 1885 he became the Herald's drama critic, and in 1888, he left the Herald to join the Chicago Tribune.

Potter's first play was The City Directory (1889), following by a string of additional plays, including the adaptation of Trilby.

== Partial bibliography ==
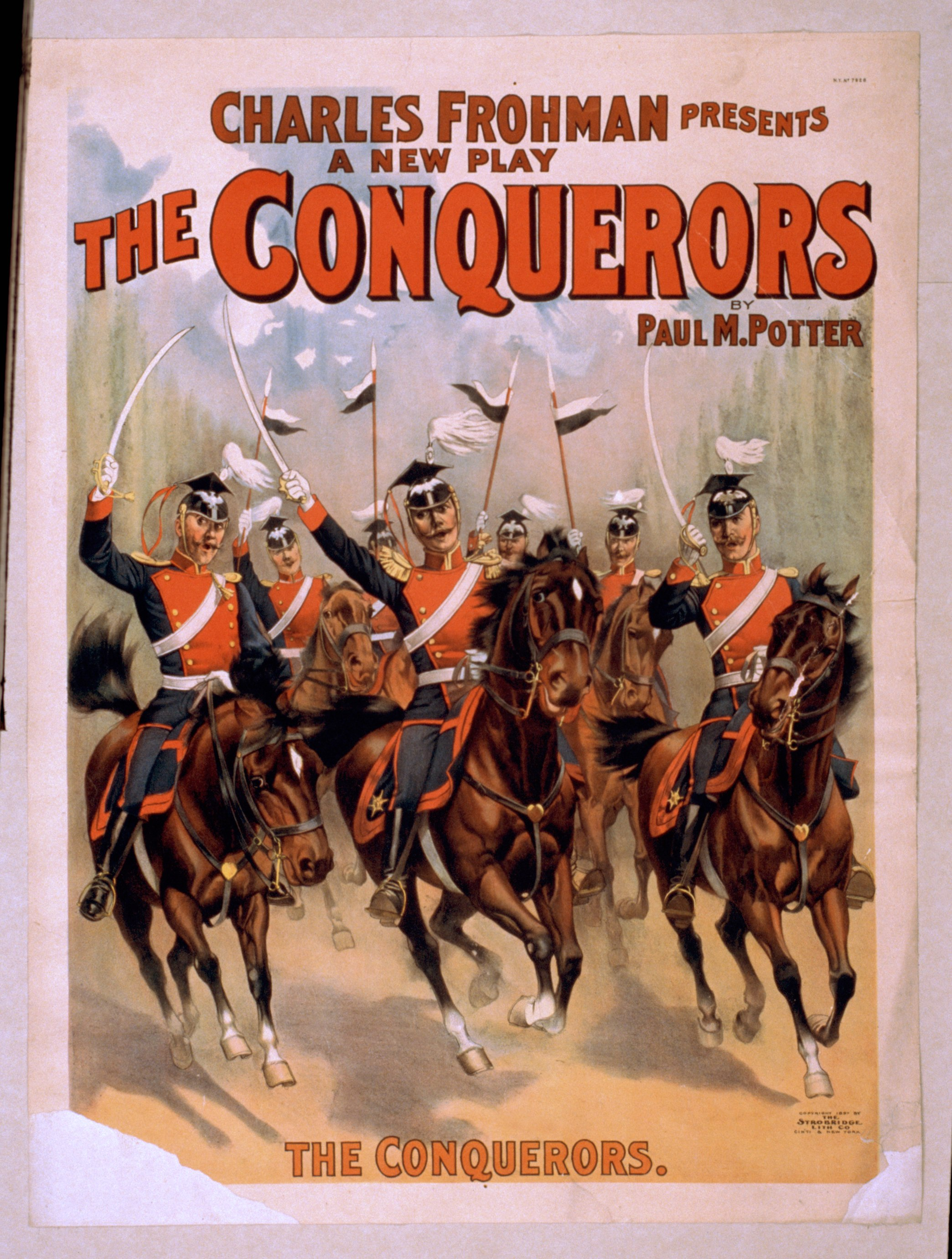
Potter's The Conquerors (1898)

- The City Directory (1889)
- The Ugly Duckling (1890) (featured Broadway debut of Mrs. Leslie Carter)
- The World's Fair (1891)
- The American Minister (1892) (for William H. Crane)
- Sheridan, or the Maid of Bath (1893) (for E. H. Sothern)
- Our Country Cousins (1893)
- The Victoria Cross (1894)
- The Pacific Mail (1894)
- Trilby (1895)
- The Stag Party (1895) (co-written with humorist Bill Nye)
- The Conquerors (1898)
- Under Two Flags (1901) (based on 1867 novel)
- The Red Kloof (1901)
- Notre Dame (1902)
- The School Girl (1903)
- Nancy Stair (1905) (based on Elinor Macartney Lane novel)
- Barbara's Millions (1906)
- The Honor of the Family (1908)
- The Queen of the Moulin Rouge (1908)
- The Girl from Rector's (1909) (with Henry Hamilton)
- Arsene Lupin (adaptation, see Arsène Lupin)
- Israel.
