= Ouida =

English novelist (1839–1908)

Marie Louise de la Ramée
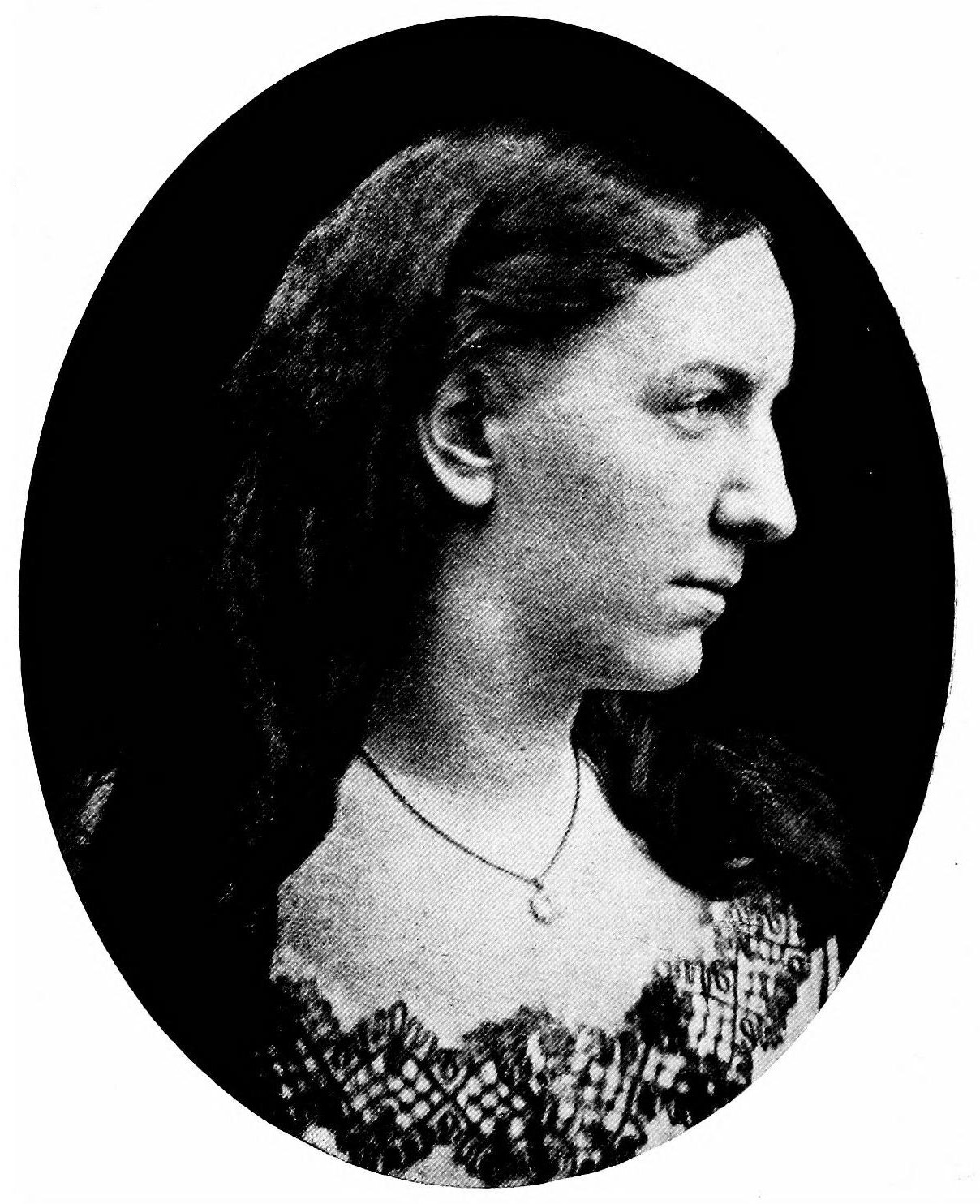
- Photograph c. 1867–1871
- Born: Maria Louise Ramé; 1 January 1839; Bury St Edmunds, England
- Died: 25 January 1908 (aged 69); Viareggio, Italy
- Occupation: Novelist
- Writing career
- Pen name: Ouida

Signature
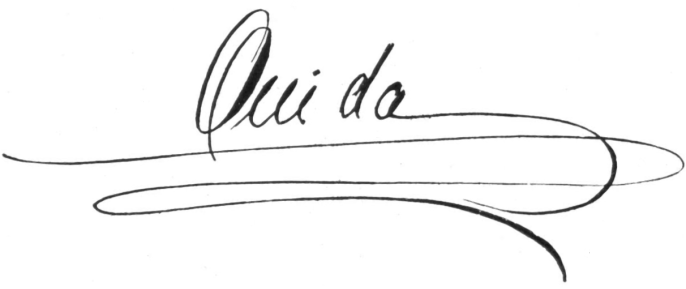

Maria Louise Ramé (1 January 1839 – 25 January 1908), going by the name Marie Louise de la Ramée and known by the pseudonym Ouida (/ˈwiːdə/ WEE-də), was an English novelist. Ouida wrote more than 40 novels, as well as short stories, children's books and essays. Moderately successful, she lived a life of luxury, entertaining many of the literary figures of the day.

Under Two Flags (1867), one of her most famous novels, described the British in Algeria. It expressed sympathy for the French colonists – with whom Ouida deeply identified – and, to some extent, the Arabs. The novel was adapted for the stage, and was filmed six times. Her 1872 novel A Dog of Flanders is considered a children's classic in much of Asia. The American author Jack London cited her novel Signa as one of the reasons for his literary success. Her lavish lifestyle eventually led her to penury, and her works were put up for auction to pay her debts. She died in Italy from pneumonia. Soon after her death, her friends organized a public subscription in Bury St Edmunds, her birthplace, where they had a fountain for horses and dogs installed in her name.

== Early years ==
Maria Louise Ramé was born at Bury St Edmunds, Suffolk, England. Her mother, Susan Sutton, was a wine merchant's daughter; her father was from France. She derived her pen name from her own childish pronunciation of her given name "Louise". Her opinion of her birthplace fluctuated; she wrote:— "That clean, quiet antiquated town, that always puts me in the mind of an old maid dressed for a party; that lowest and dreariest of Boroughs, where the streets are as full of grass as an acre of pasture land. Why, the inhabitants are driven to ringing their own doorbells lest they rust from lack of use."

== Career ==
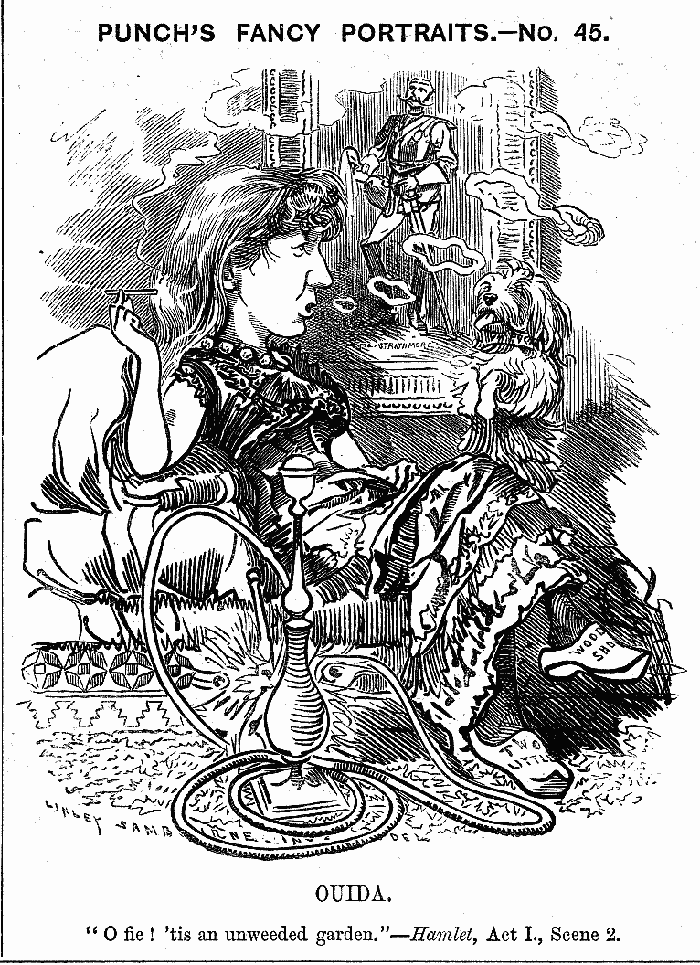
Caricature of Ouida (Punch, 20 August 1881)

She moved into the Langham Hotel, London, (Note: The hotel's loyalty programme is named after the author; see) in 1867. There, according to the hotel promotional materials, she wrote in bed, by candlelight, with the curtains drawn to keep out daylight and surrounded by purple flowers. She ran up huge hotel and florists' bills of up to 200 pounds per week and commanded soirées that included soldiers, politicians, literary lights (including Oscar Wilde, Algernon Swinburne, Robert Browning and Wilkie Collins), and artists (including John Millais). Many of her stories and characters were based upon people she invited to her salons at The Langham. Ouida was described by William Allingham in his diary of 1872 as of short stature, with a "sinister, clever face" and with a "voice like a carving knife."

For many years Ouida lived in London, but in about 1871 she moved to Italy. In 1874, she settled permanently with her mother in Florence, and there long pursued her work as a novelist. At first, she rented an apartment at the Palazzo Vagnonville. Later she removed to the Villa Farinola at Scandicci, south of Bellosguardo, three miles from Florence, where she lived in great style, entertained largely, collected objets d'art, dressed expensively but not tastefully, drove good horses, and kept many dogs, to which she was deeply attached. She lived in Bagni di Lucca for a period, where there is a commemorative plaque on an outside wall. She declared that she never received from her publishers more than £1600 for any one novel, but that she found America "a mine of wealth". In The Massarenes (1897) she gave a lurid picture of the parvenu millionaire in smart London society. This book was greatly prized by Ouida, and was very successful in terms of sales. Thenceforth she chiefly wrote for the leading magazines essays on social questions or literary criticisms, which were not remunerative. As before, she used her locations as inspiration for the setting and characters in her novels. The British and American colony in Florence was satirised in her novel, Friendship (1878). Ouida considered herself a serious artist. She was inspired by Byron in particular, and was interested in other artists of all kinds. Sympathetic descriptions of tragic painters and singers occurred in her later novels. Her work often combines romanticism with social criticism. In her novel, Puck, a talking dog narrates his views on society. Views and Opinions includes essays in her own voice on a variety of social topics. She was an animal lover and rescuer, and at times owned as many as thirty dogs.

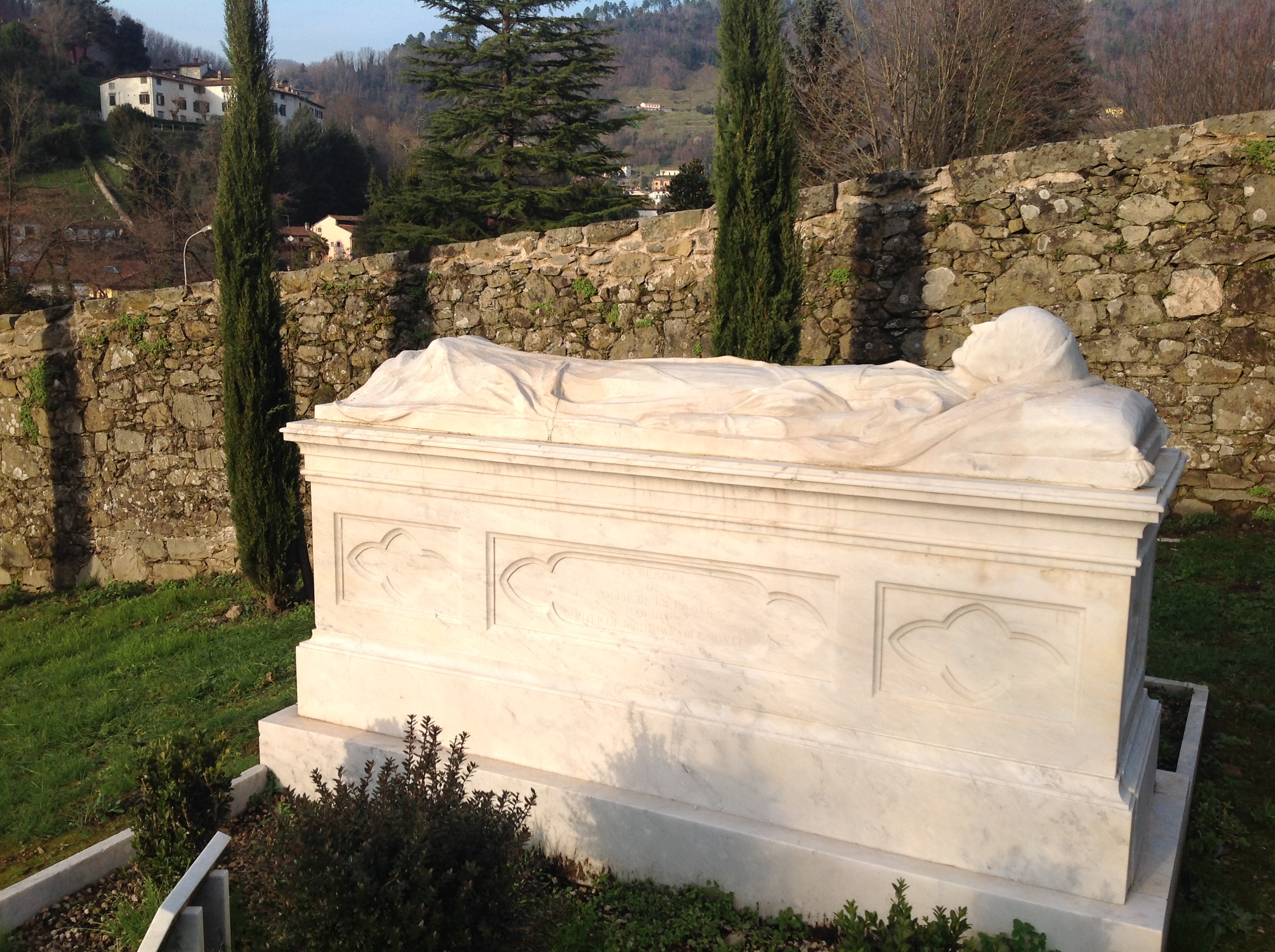
Tomb of Ouida in Bagni di Lucca's English cemetery

Although successful, she did not manage her money well. A civil list pension of £150 a year was offered to her by the prime minister, Sir Henry Campbell-Bannerman, on the application of Alfred Austin, George Wyndham, and Walburga, Lady Paget, which she reluctantly accepted after a request by her friend, Lady Howard of Glossop, on 16 July 1906.

She continued to live in Italy until her death on 25 January 1908, at 70 Via Zanardelli, Viareggio, of pneumonia. She is buried in the English Cemetery in Bagni di Lucca, Italy.

== Animal rights ==
Ouida was an advocate of animal rights and a staunch anti-vivisectionist. She authored The New Priesthood: A Protest Against Vivisection, in 1897.

Ouida authored articles denouncing animal experimentation in The Gentleman's Magazine and The Fortnightly Review. She opposed the fur trade and hunting.

== Literary career ==
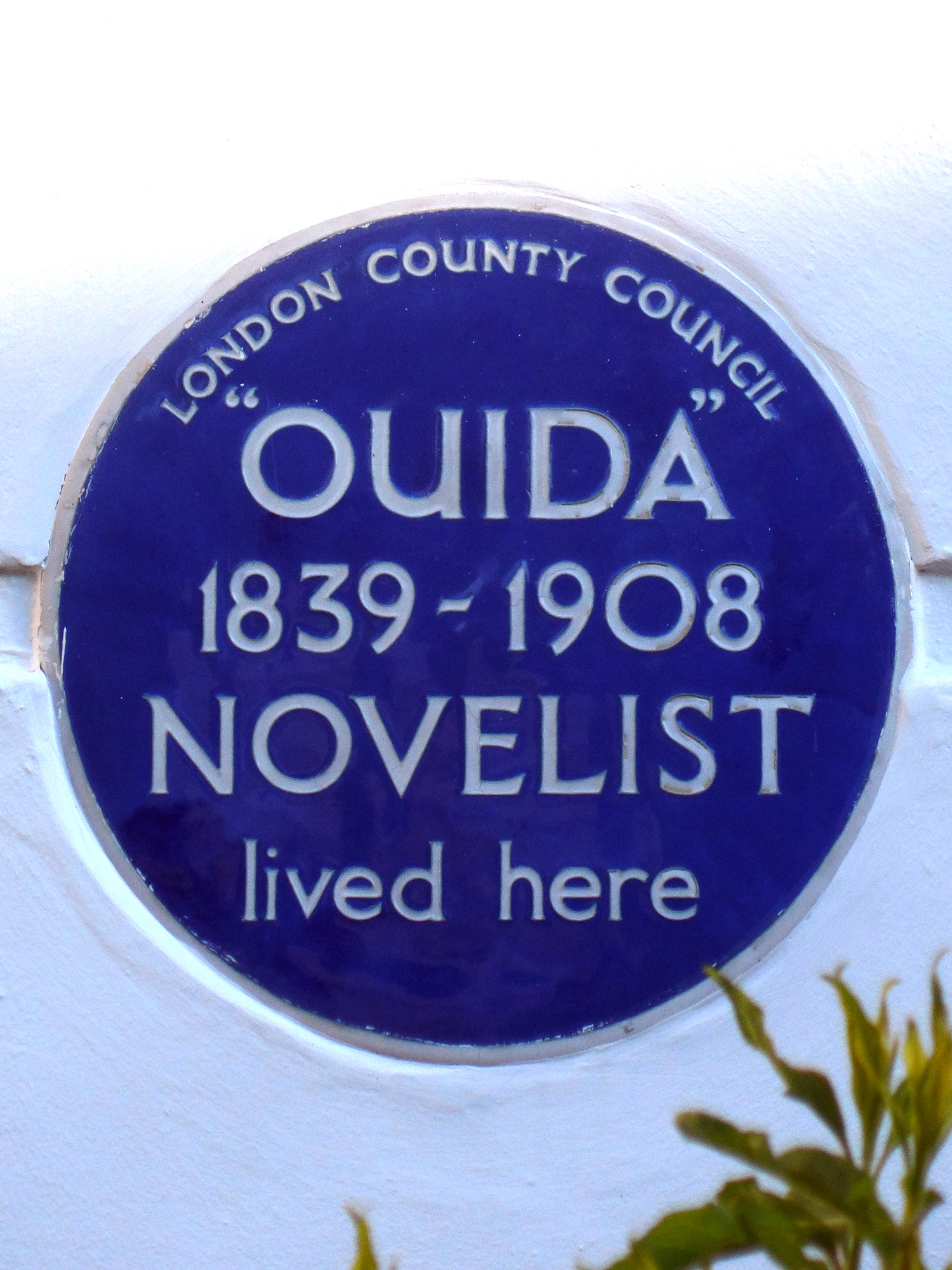
Blue plaque erected in 1952 by London County Council at 11 Ravenscourt Square, Hammersmith, London W6

During her career, Ouida wrote more than 40 novels, children's books and collections of short stories and essays. Her work had several phases.

In 1863, when she was 24, she published her first novel, Held in Bondage. (She later claimed to have written her well-received 1867 novel Idalia at the age of 16. It featured a rebellious ingénue heroine who was sympathetic to Italian independence.)

In her early period, her novels were considered "racy" and "swashbuckling", a contrast to "the moralistic prose of early Victorian literature" (Tom Steele), and a hybrid of the sensationalism of the 1860s and the proto-adventure novels being published as part of the romanticisation of imperial expansion. Later her work was more typical of historical romance, though she never stopped commenting on contemporary society. She also wrote several stories for children.

Under Two Flags (1867), one of her most famous novels, described the British in Algeria. It expressed sympathy for the French colonists (called pieds noirs) – with whom Ouida deeply identified – and, to some extent, the Arabs. The novel was adapted for the stage, and was filmed six times. The American author Jack London cited her novel Signa (1875), which he read at the age of eight, as one of the eight reasons for his literary success.

== Influence ==
The British composer Frederic Hymen Cowen and his librettists Gilbert Arthur à Beckett, H. A. Rudall, and Frederic Edward Weatherly acquired the rights to Ouida's 1875 novel Signa to create an opera for Richard D'Oyly Carte's Royal English Opera House to succeed Arthur Sullivan's Ivanhoe in 1891. Between Cowen not being ready with his work and the collapse of Carte's venture, Cowen eventually took his finished opera Signa to Italy with an Italian translation of the original English text by G.A. Mazzucato. After many delays and production troubles, Cowen's Signa was first performed in a reduced three-act version at the Teatro Dal Verme, Milan on 12 November 1893. After further revision and much cutting, it was later given in a two-act version at Covent Garden, London on 30 June 1894, at which point Cowen wondered if there was any sense left in the opera at all. Ouida's impression of the work is unknown.

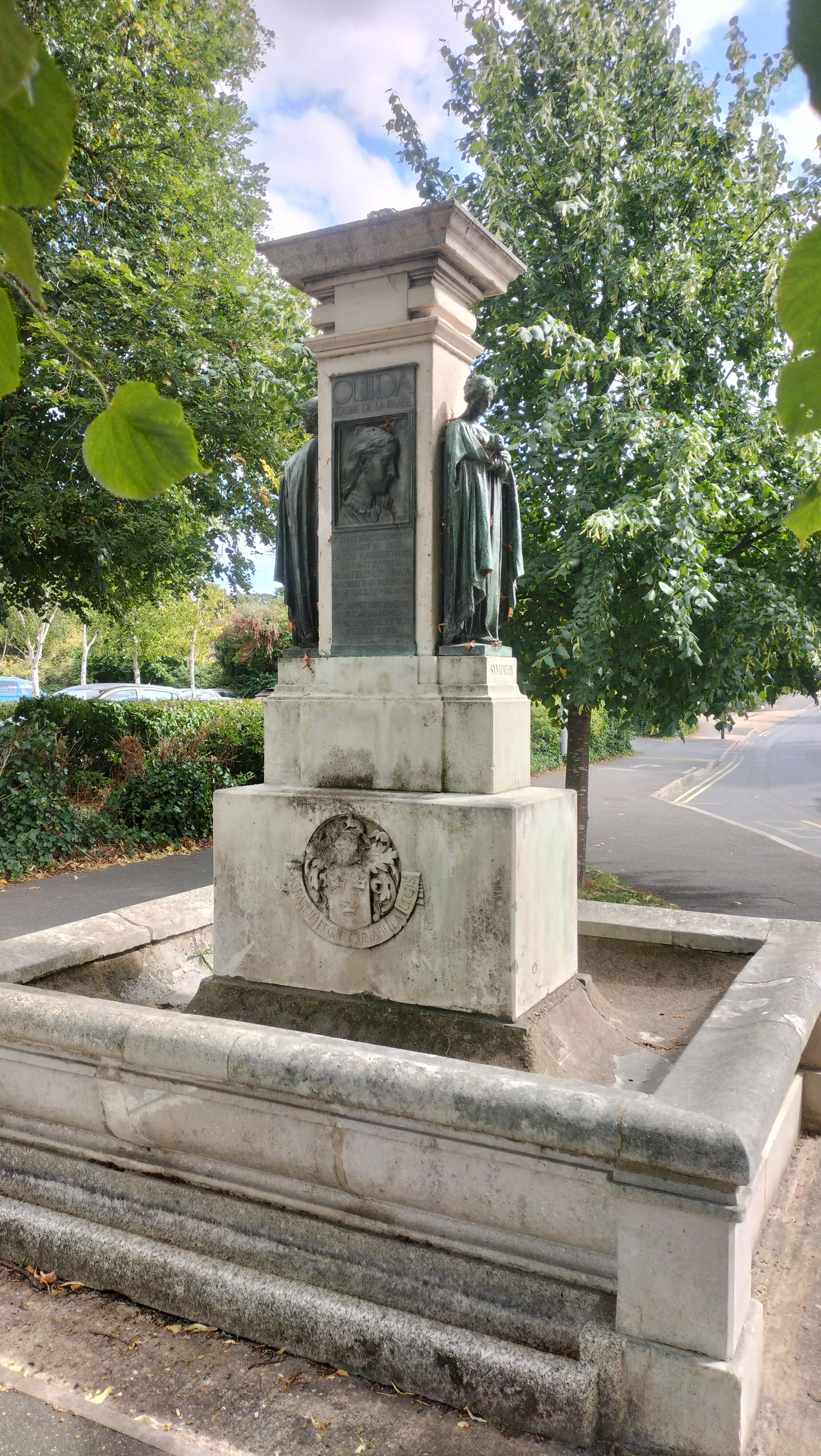
Ouida Memorial, formerly a drinking fountain, in Bury St Edmunds, Suffolk

Later, Pietro Mascagni bought the rights for her story "Two Little Wooden Shoes", intending to adapt it for an opera. His friend Giacomo Puccini became interested in the story and began a court action, claiming that because Ouida was in debt, the rights to her works should be put up for public auction to raise funds for creditors. He won the court challenge and persuaded his publisher Ricordi to bid for the story. After Ricordi won, Puccini lost interest and never composed the opera. Mascagni later composed one based on the story, under the title Lodoletta.

Spiritualist Helen Peters Nosworthy was wearing a locket containing Ouida's portrait and signature that seemed to spell out ouija during a 1890 seance in which Nosworthy asked a talking board to name itself and it responded O-U-I-J-A. Nosworthy and brother-in-law Elijah Bond were granted a patent for the ouija board the following year.

== Legacy and honours ==
Soon after her death, her friends organized a public subscription in Bury St Edmunds, where they had a fountain for horses and dogs installed in her name. Its inscription was composed by Lord Curzon:

Her friends have erected this fountain in the place of her birth. Here may God's creatures whom she loved assuage her tender soul as they drink.

Fellow author "Rita" Humphreys (Eliza Margaret Jane Humphreys, 1850–1938) wrote a eulogy to Ouida and sent it to the press soon after her death. It was read at the unveiling of Ouida's memorial. During Rita's youth, Ouida had been popular but the girl was forbidden to read her. She made up for it later by purchasing every book written by Ouida and keeping them in her library for the rest of her life.

== Bibliography ==
Year	Work	Notes
1863	Held in Bondage	First published with the title Granville de Vigne
1865	Strathmore	
1866	Chandos	
1867	Cecil Castlemaine's Gage	
1867	Idalia	
1867	Under Two Flags	Film versions in 1912 (two), 1915 (shorts), 1916, 1922 (directed by Tod Browning), and 1936 (starring Ronald Colman and Claudette Colbert)
1868	Randolph Gordon and Other Stories	
1868	Beatrice Boville and Other Stories	
1869	Tricotrin	
1870	Puck	
1871	Folle-Farine	
1871	A Leaf in the Storm	
1871	A Provence Rose	
1871	A Branch of Lilac	
1871	A Dog of Flanders	English-language film versions in 1935, 1959 and 1999 (starring Jon Voight); popular cartoon TV series in Japan in 1975
1872	A Leaf in the Storm, and Other Stories	Includes A Leaf in the Storm, A Provence Rose, A Dog of Flanders, and A Branch of Lilac
1874	Pascarel	
1874	Two Little Wooden Shoes	Also published with the title Bébée; Pietro Mascagni's opera version in 1917; film version in 1920
1875	Signa	
1876	In a Winter City	
1877	Ariadne	
1878	Friendship	
1880	Moths	
1880	Pipistrello and Other Stories	
1881	A Village Commune	
1882	Bimbi: Stories for Children	Includes The Nürnberg Stove, The Ambitious Rose-tree, Moufflou, Lampblack, The Child of Urbino, In the Apple-Country, Findelkind, Meleagris Gallopavo and The Little Earl
1882	In Maremma	
1883	Afternoon	
1883	Frescoes: Dramatic Sketches	
1883	Wanda	
1884	Princess Napraxine	
1885	A Rainy June	
1885	Othmar	
1886	Don Guesaldo	
1887	A House Party	
1889	Guilderoy	
1890	Ruffino and Other Stories	
1890	Syrlin	
1891	Santa Barbara and Other Stories	
1892	The Tower of Taddeo	
1893	The New Priesthood: A Protest Against Vivisection	
1894	The Silver Christ	
1894	The Silver Christ and A Lemon Tree	
1894	Two Offenders and Other Tales	
1895	Toxin	Appeared as a short story in The Illustrated London News, Summer number, 1895, pp. 2–18.
1895	Views and Opinions	
1896	Le Selve and Other Tales	
1897	An Altruist	
1897	Dogs	
1897	Muriella; or, Le Selve	
1897	The Massarenes	
1899	La Strega and Other Stories	
1900	Critical Studies	
1900	The Waters of Edera	
1901	Street Dust and Other Stories	
1908	Helianthus	
1909	A Dog of Flanders, The Nürnberg Stove and Other Stories	Includes A Dog of Flanders, The Nürnberg Stove, In the Apple-Country and The Little Earl
1910	Moufflou and Other Stories	Includes Moufflou, Lampblack and The Ambitious Rose-tree

== Filmography ==
- Moths (1913, based on the novel Moths)
- Strathmore, directed by Francis J. Grandon (1915, based on the novel Strathmore)
- The Little Dutch Girl, directed by Émile Chautard (1915, based on the novel Two Little Wooden Shoes)
- Under Two Flags, directed by J. Gordon Edwards (1916, based on the novel Under Two Flags)
- Her Greatest Love, directed by J. Gordon Edwards (1917, based on the novel Moths)
- Two Little Wooden Shoes, directed by Sidney Morgan (1920, based on the novel Two Little Wooden Shoes)
- Under Two Flags, directed by Tod Browning (1922, based on the novel Under Two Flags)
- A Boy of Flanders, directed by Victor Schertzinger (1924, based on the novel A Dog of Flanders)
- In Maremma, directed by Salvatore Aversano (Italy, 1924, based on the novel In Maremma)
- Flames of Desire, directed by Denison Clift (1924, based on the novel Strathmore)
- A Dog of Flanders, directed by Edward Sloman (1935, based on the novel A Dog of Flanders)
- Under Two Flags, directed by Frank Lloyd (1936, based on the novel Under Two Flags)
- A Dog of Flanders, directed by James B. Clark (1960, based on the novel A Dog of Flanders)
- Dog of Flanders, directed by Yoshio Kuroda (Japan, 1975, animated TV series, based on the novel A Dog of Flanders)
- Moths, a 1977 adaptation for the Thames Television romance series along with adaptations of Three Weeks by Elinor Glyn, The Black Knight by Ethel M. Dell, High Noon by Ruby M. Ayres, House of Men by Catherine Marchant and Emily by Jilly Cooper.
- Romance: Moths, directed by Waris Hussein (UK, 1977, TV film, based on the novel Moths). The script was written by Hugh Whitemore, and the cast included Maria Aitken, Cathryn Harrison and Nigel Davenport.
- A Dog of Flanders, directed by Kevin Brodie (1999, based on the novel A Dog of Flanders)

== Radio broadcasts ==
- Moths was broadcast on BBC Radio 4 in 1996, and repeated on BBC Radio 4 Extra in 2023. The play was directed by Janet Whitaker. The script was written by Chrys Salt. Lady Dolly was played by Nicola Pagett, and Vere by Teresa Gallagher.
