= Afternoon (play) =

Play written by Ouida

Afternoon is a feminist play written in 1883 by Ouida. It features a man, Earl L'Estrange, who marries a peasant girl, Claire Glyon. L'Estrange grows disillusioned with her and it seems she drowned herself. However, twenty years later he falls in love with a reclusive artist famous for her work, which turns out to be Claire herself, who has not drowned at all. For the remainder of the play, Claire and her friend Laura mock L'Estranger with biting wit, and he in turn eventually concedes that he had not valued his wife as he should have.

A character in the play, Aldred Dorian, inspired Oscar Wilde's Dorian Grey.
