= Under Two Flags (1922 film) =

1922 film

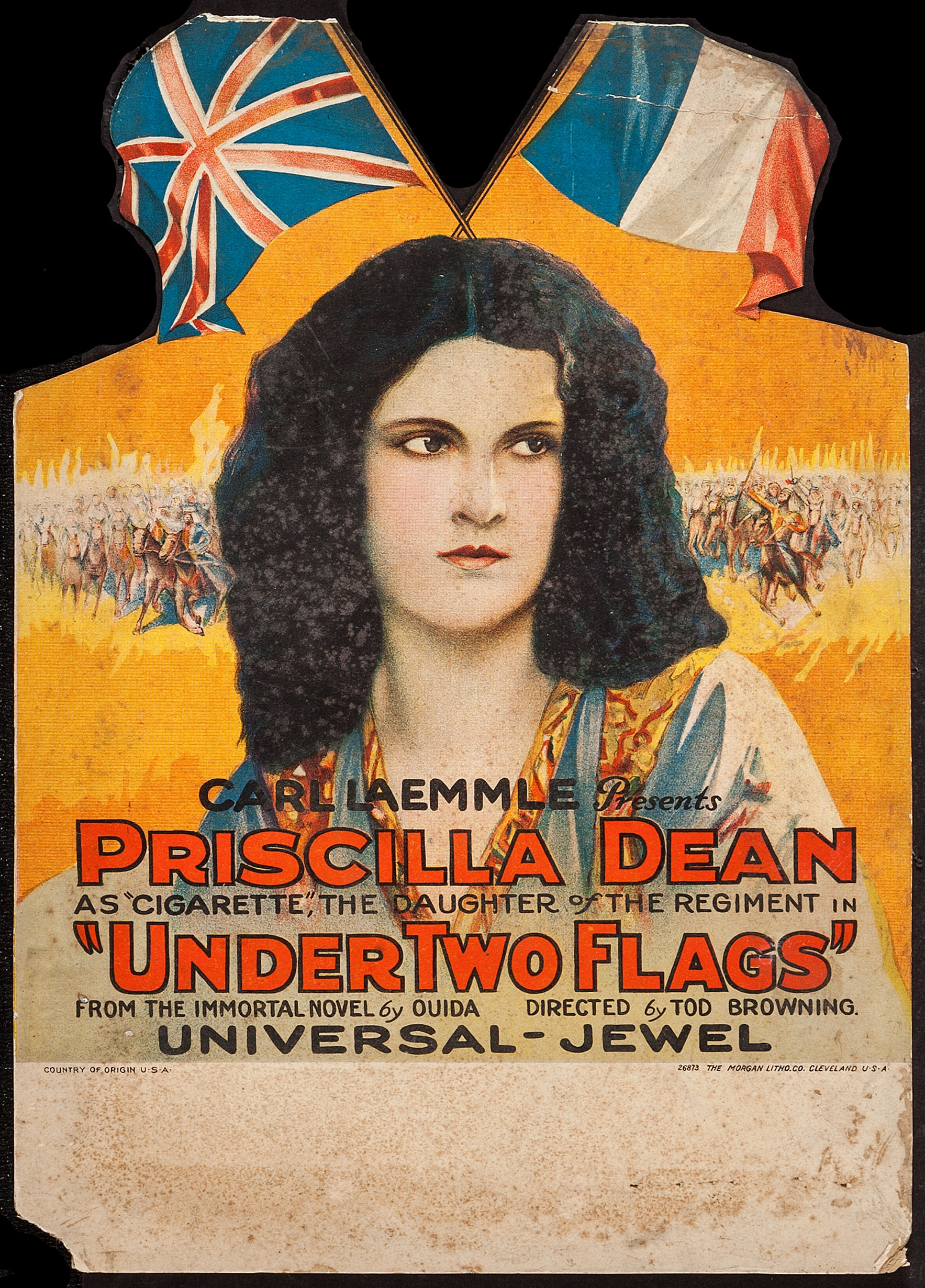
- Film poster
- Directed by: Tod Browning
- Written by: Tod Browning (adaptation); Elliott J. Clawson (scenario); Edward T. Lowe Jr. (adaptation & scenario)
- Based on: Under Two Flags by Ouida; Arthur Shirley (play)
- Starring: Priscilla Dean; James Kirkwood
- Cinematography: William Fildew
- Distributed by: Universal Film Manufacturing Company
- Release date: November 6, 1922
- Running time: 80 minutes
- Country: United States
- Language: Silent (English intertitles)

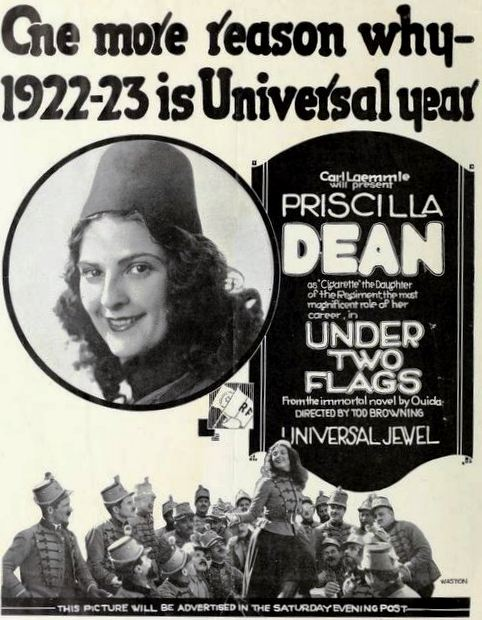
Magazine advertisement

Under Two Flags is a 1922 American drama film directed by Tod Browning and starring Priscilla Dean. The picture was one of several films based upon the 1867 novel Under Two Flags by Ouida and subsequent stage play version by Arthur Shirley. A print of Under Two Flags exists.

== Cast ==
- Priscilla Dean as Cigarette
- James Kirkwood as Cpl. Victor
- John Davidson as Sheik Ben Ali Hammed
- Stuart Holmes as Marquis de Chateauroy (Holmes also appeared in an earlier version of Under Two Flags with Theda Bara)
- Ethel Grey Terry as Princess Corona
- Bobby Mack as Rake (as Robert Mack)
- Burton Law as Sheik's aide
- Albert Pollet as Capt. Tollaire
- W.H. Bainbridge as The Colonel
- Wilberta Almyra Babbidge as Dancer (uncredited)
- Rose Dione as Barmaid (uncredited)

== Production ==
The film was delayed for a few days when, on the last day of shooting in 1922, a fire at Universal City destroyed 110,000 feet of the positive copy of the film. The fire was quickly put out and the negative copy of the film was essentially undamaged. During the fire Priscilla Dean, who was still in costume, tripped on some stairs and turned her ankle.
